= U.S. Route 19 in West Virginia =

Segment of American highway

U.S. Route 19
- Corridor L
- US 19 highlighted in red

Route information
- Maintained by WVDOH
- Length: 253.5 mi (408.0 km)
- Existed: 1926–present

Major junctions
- South end: US 19 in Bluefield, VA
- US 52 in Bluefield; I-77 near Camp Creek; WV 16 near Oak Hill; US 60 at Hico; I-79 near Canfield; US 33 / US 119 in Weston; US 50 in Clarksburg; US 250 in Fairmont; I-79 near Westover; US 119 / WV 7 in Morgantown
- North end: US 19 near Mount Morris PA

Location
- Country: United States
- State: West Virginia
- Counties: Mercer, Raleigh, Fayette, Nicholas, Braxton, Lewis, Harrison, Marion, Monongalia

Highway system
- United States Numbered Highway System; List; Special; Divided; West Virginia State Highway System; Interstate; US; State
← WV 18	→ WV 20

U.S. Route 19 (US 19) runs south to north up through central West Virginia. The route runs from the Virginia state line at Bluefield, north to the Pennsylvania state line south of Mount Morris, Pennsylvania.

== Route description ==
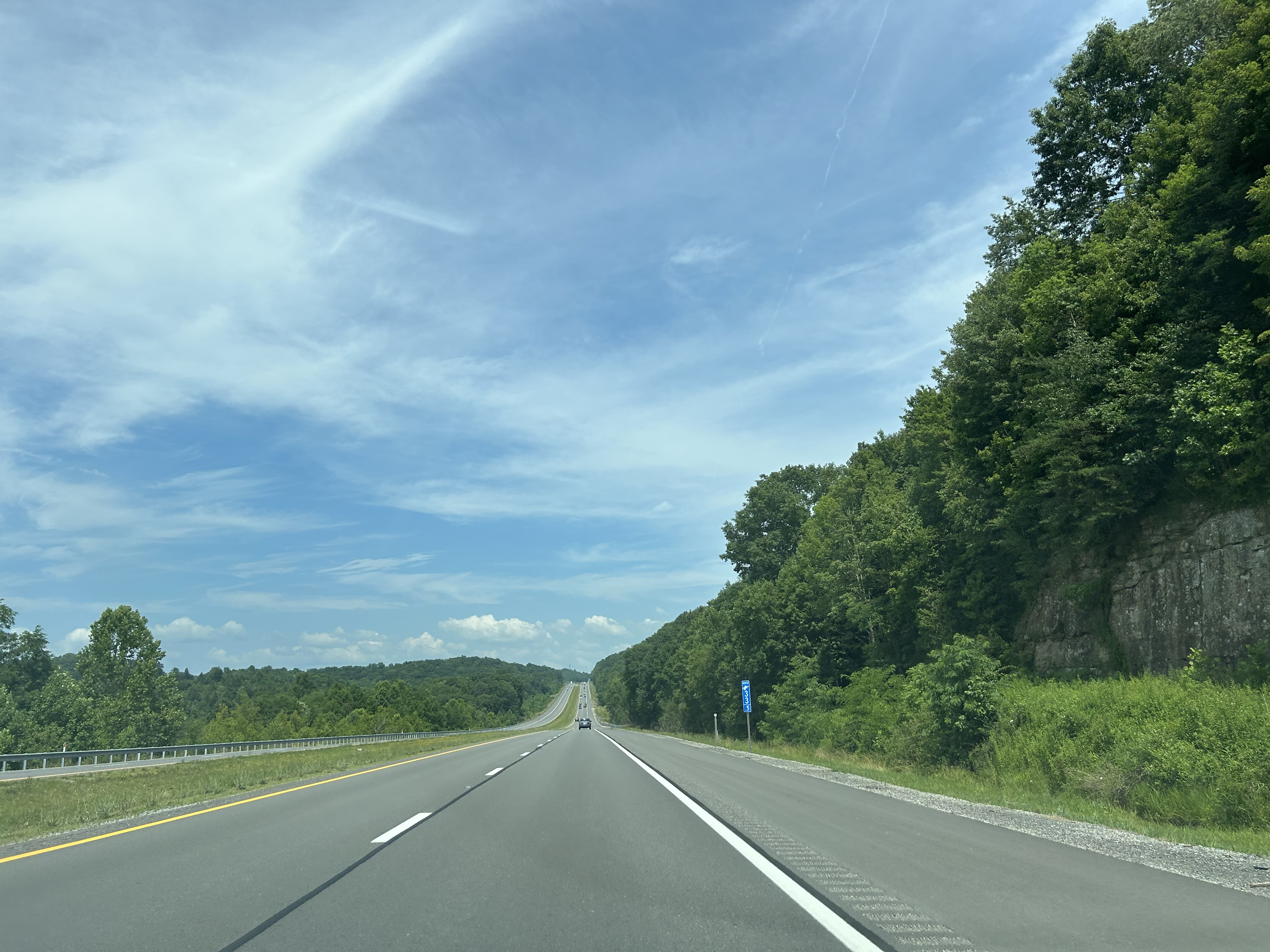
View north along US 19 and Corridor L north of Hico

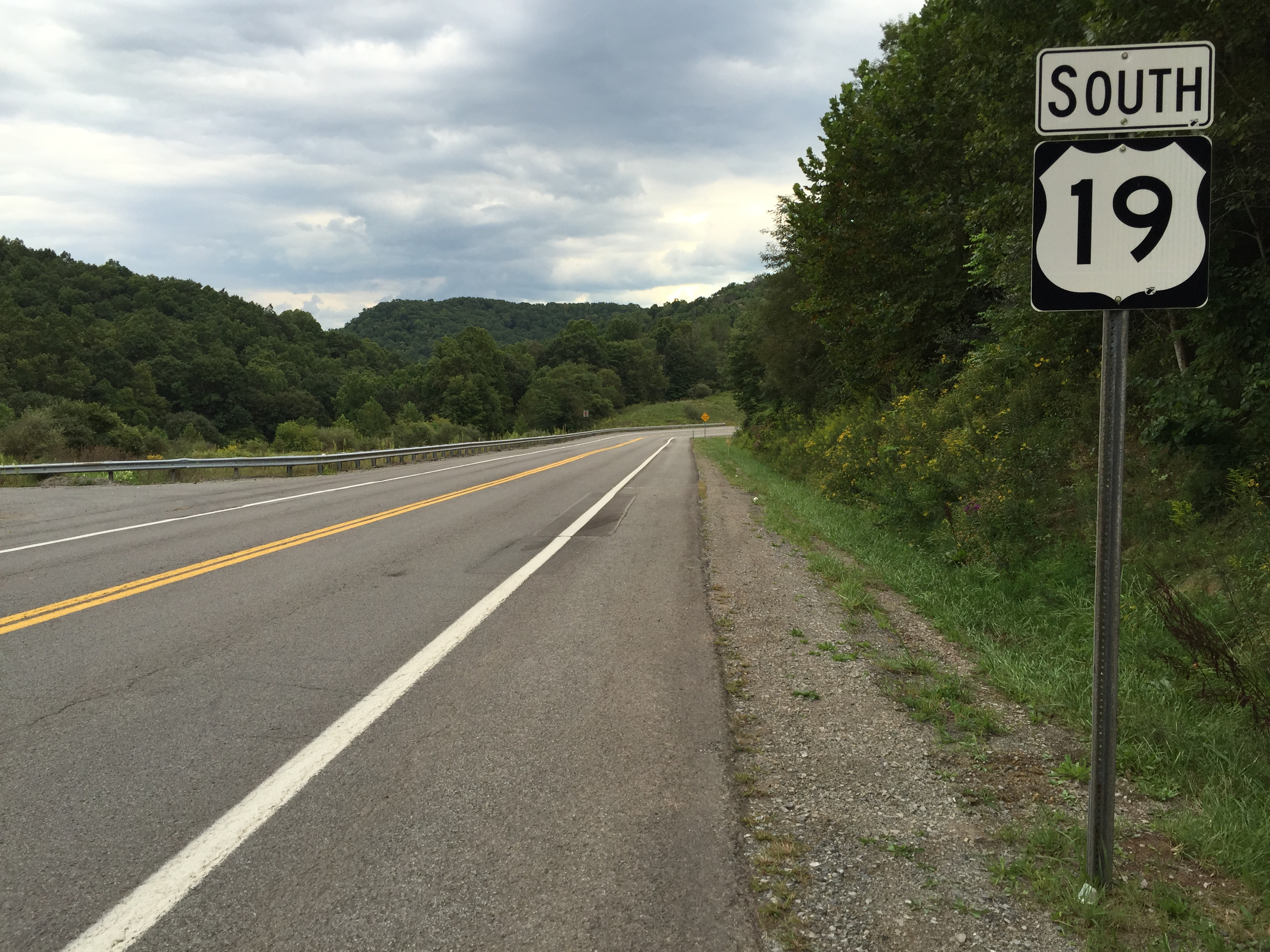
View south along US 19 at I-79 in Lewis County

US 19 passes through the limits of the cities and towns of Bluefield, Princeton, Beckley, Oak Hill, Fayetteville, Summersville, Flatwoods, Weston, Jane Lew, Clarksburg, Shinnston, Worthington, Monongah, Fairmont, Rivesville, Westover, Morgantown, and Star City, in addition to the smaller communities of Kegley, Spanishburg, Flat Top, Ghent, Cool Ridge, Shady Spring, Daniels, Beaver, Johnstown, Hico, Heaters, Napier, Letch, Ireland, Ben Dale, Homewood, Kitsonville, Hepzibah, Meadowbrook, Enterprise, Arnettsville, and Georgetown.

Between Bluefield and Beckley, US 19 has been largely supplanted by Interstate 77 (I-77) and the West Virginia Turnpike. Between Prosperity and northeast of Canfield, the route serves as a major southwest–northwest artery as Corridor L of the Appalachian Development Highway System (ADHS). It is along Corridor L that it crosses the New River via the well-known New River Gorge Bridge. Between Canfield and into Pennsylvania, the route has largely supplanted by I-79.

Aside from the four-lane limited access Corridor L, US 19 remains largely two-lane rural road with numerous curves outside of major cities.

== History ==
By May 1973, hearings had been planned on widening the highway to four lanes in between Claypool Hill and Lebanon; at that time, such work had been completed between Abingdon and Hansonville, with a contract allocated for work from Hansonville to Lebanon.

== Major intersections ==
County	Location	mi	km	Exit	Destinations	Notes
Mercer	Bluefield	0.00	0.00		US 19 south (Virginia Avenue) – Bluefield	Continuation into Virginia
Mercer	Bluefield	1.3	2.1		US 52 west (Spruce Street)	South end of US 52 overlap
Mercer	Bluefield	2.1	3.4		US 52 east (Bland Street)	One-way street, outbound access only
Mercer	Bluefield	2.14	3.44		US 52 (Federal Street); US 52 Truck begins	One-way street, inbound access only; north end of US 52 overlap; south end of US 52 Truck overlap; western terminus of US 52 Truck
Mercer		5.0	8.0		WV 112 east – Oakvale	Western terminus of WV 112; former US 19 north
Mercer		5.3	8.5		US 460 west / US 52 Truck south to I-77 – Tazewell Va.	North end of US 52 Truck overlap; south end of US 460 overlap
Mercer		8.6	13.8		WV 123 west – Mercer County Airport	Eastern terminus of WV 123
Mercer		10.6	17.1		US 460 east – Pearisburg VA	North end of US 460 overlap
Mercer	Princeton	12.2	19.6		WV 104 west (Morrison Drive)	South end of WV 104 overlap
Mercer	Princeton	12.3	19.8		WV 104 east (Stafford Drive)	North end of WV 104 overlap
Mercer	Princeton	12.7– 12.8	20.4– 20.6		WV 20 (Main Street)	Traffic circle around Mercer County Courthouse
Mercer		17.3– 17.4	27.8– 28.0		WV 10 north – Matoaka	Southern terminus of WV 10
Mercer		28.5– 28.7	45.9– 46.2		I-77 – Bluefield, Beckley	I-77 exit 20
Raleigh	Ghent	38.6	62.1		CR 48 (Odd Road) to I-77 Toll	
Raleigh	Shady Spring	45.1	72.6		WV 3 east (Hinton Road) – Hinton	South end of WV 3 overlap
Raleigh		46.8	75.3		WV 307 west (Grandview Road)	Eastern terminus of WV 307
Raleigh	Daniels–Beaver line	49.2	79.2		WV 307 east (Airport Road) to I-64	Western terminus of WV 307
Raleigh	Beckley	51.1	82.2		WV 3 west (Fayette Street)	North end of WV 3 overlap
Raleigh	Beckley	51.3	82.6		WV 210 north (Kanawha Street) – Downtown	Southern terminus of WV 210
Raleigh	Beckley	51.7	83.2		To I-64 / I-77 – Lewisburg, Bluefield	"To I-64/I-77" signed northbound only
Raleigh	Beckley	52.0	83.7		Larew Avenue / Jersey Avenue to I-64 / I-77	
Raleigh	Beckley	52.7	84.8		WV 41 south (Johnstown Road)	South end of WV 41 overlap
Raleigh	Beckley	53.5– 53.6	86.1– 86.3		WV 41 north (Stanaford Road) to I-64 – Prince Rural Acres Drive to WV 16 south	North end of WV 41 overlap; "To WV 16 south" signed northbound only, "To I-64" signed southbound only
Raleigh	Beckley	54.6	87.9		WV 16 south / Ragland Road (CR 8)	South end of WV 16 overlap
Raleigh	Prosperity	57.9– 58.2	93.2– 93.7		I-64 / I-77 (Toll Road) / WV 16 north – Charleston, Bluefield, Bradley	Tolled interchange with I-64/I-77, intersection with WV 16; north end of WV 16 overlap; I-77 exit 48; access to I-64/I-77 via unsigned US 19 Alt. (Corridor L south)
Raleigh	Prosperity	57.9– 58.2	93.2– 93.7		Begin US 19 overlap with limited access Corridor L	
Raleigh		59.4	95.6		Bradley	Interchange via connector road to WV 16
Fayette		59.8	96.2		Mt. Hope	Interchange via connector road
Fayette					WV 612 west (Whipple Church Road) – Mossy	Eastern terminus of WV 612
Fayette	Oak Hill	66.5	107.0		WV 16 south / WV 61 south – Greenstown, Hilltop	South end of WV 16/WV 61 overlap
Fayette	Oak Hill	66.5	107.0	Begin freeway		
Fayette	Oak Hill	66.8– 66.9	107.5– 107.7	—	WV 16 north / WV 61 north (Hank Williams Sr. Memorial Road) – Downtown	North end of WV 16/WV 61 overlap; northbound exit and southbound entrance
Fayette	Oak Hill	67.6– 68.0	108.8– 109.4	—	E. Main Street (WV 16) WV 16 (Main Street) to WV 61 north	Northbound signage Southbound signage
Fayette	Oak Hill	68.4– 68.8	110.1– 110.7	—	CR 1943 (Oyler Avenue)	
Fayette	Oak Hill	69.4– 69.7	111.7– 112.2	—	CR 38 (Summerlee Road)	
Fayette	Oak Hill	70.1– 70.6	112.8– 113.6	—	CR 2118 (Lochgelly Road) to WV 16 – North Oak Hill	
Fayette		71.3	114.7	End freeway		
Fayette	Fayetteville	74.5	119.9		WV 16 (Court Street) – Fayetteville, Gauley Bridge	
Fayette	New River	75.6– 76.2	121.7– 122.6		New River Gorge Bridge	
Fayette	Hico	81.2– 81.6	130.7– 131.3		US 60 (Midland Trail) – Gauley Bridge, Rainelle	Interchange
Meadow River		86.3– 86.6	138.9– 139.4		Kevin Ritchie Memorial Bridge	
Nicholas		91.4	147.1		WV 129 – Mount Nebo, Drennen, Summersville Lake	
Nicholas		92.7	149.2		WV 41 south – Mount Nebo	South end of WV 41 overlap
Nicholas	Summersville Lake	94.7– 95.0	152.4– 152.9		Hughes Bridge	
Nicholas	Summersville	97.3	156.6		WV 41 north – Summersville	North end of WV 41 overlap
Nicholas	Summersville	97.9	157.6		WV 39 – Richwood, Summersville	
Nicholas	Summersville	100.3	161.4		WV 41 – Craigsville, Webster Springs, Summersville	Craigsville signed northbound only; Summersville signed southbound only
Nicholas		104.3– 104.7	167.9– 168.5		WV 55 east – Muddlety, Craigsville	Interchange; western terminus of WV 55
Nicholas	Birch River	115.0– 115.4	185.1– 185.7		WV 82 – Birch River, Cowen	Interchange
Braxton		125.2– 125.6	201.5– 202.1		Northern terminus of limited access Corridor L	
Braxton		125.2– 125.6	201.5– 202.1		I-79 south – Charleston	South end of I-79 overlap; I-79 exit 57
Braxton		129.3– 129.7	208.1– 208.7	62	WV 4 – Sutton, Gassaway	Exit number follows I-79
Braxton		134.6– 134.7	216.6– 216.8		I-79 north – Clarksburg	North end of I-79 overlap; I-79 exit 67
Braxton		134.8	216.9		WV 4 south to WV 15 – Sutton	South end of WV 4 overlap
Braxton	Heaters	139.8	225.0		WV 5 north (Gem Road)	Southern terminus of WV 5
Lewis		155.9– 156.0	250.9– 251.1		WV 4 north – Rock Cave, West Virginia Wildlife Center	North end of WV 4 overlap
Lewis		170.2– 170.3	273.9– 274.1		I-79 – Clarksburg, Charleston	I-79 exit 91
Lewis	Bendale	175.0	281.6		Skin Creek Road (CR 30) to I-79	
Lewis	Weston	176.5	284.0		Center Avenue (US 19 north)	One-way street, outbound access only; U-turn from US 19 south (Main Avenue)
Lewis	Weston	176.8	284.5		US 33 / US 119 (Second Street) – Historic Asylum Tours	South end of US 33/US 119 overlap
Lewis	Weston	176.9	284.7		US 33 east / US 119 north (Third Street east) to I-79	Northbound access only
Lewis	Weston	177.0	284.9		US 19 south / US 33 west / US 119 south (Main Avenue south)	One-way street, outbound access only; north end of US 33/US 119 overlap
Lewis	Weston	177.0	284.9		US 19 / US 33 / US 119 (Third Street)	One-way street, inbound access only; north end of US 33/US 119 overlap
Lewis	Jane Lew	183.9	296.0		CR 7 (Hackers Creek Road) to I-79	
Harrison		193.4	311.2		WV 270 east (Main Street)	Western terminus of WV 270
Harrison	Clarksburg	199.6	321.2		WV 98 west (Davisson Run Road) to US 50	South end of WV 98 overlap
Harrison	Clarksburg	200.0	321.9		WV 98 east (Clarksburg Park Way) – Nutter Fort	North end of WV 98 overlap
Harrison	Clarksburg	201.4	324.1		WV 20 east (Milford Street / West Pike Street)	South end of WV 20 overlap
Harrison	Clarksburg	202.8	326.4		US 50 (Northwestern Turnpike) – Bridgeport, Parkersburg	
Harrison	Meadowbrook	208.2	335.1		CR 24 (Meadowbrook Road) to I-79	"To I-79" signed southbound only
Harrison		210.0	338.0		WV 20 west – Lumberport, New Martinsville	North end of WV 20 overlap
Harrison	Shinnston	211.6	340.5		WV 131 south (Saltwell Road) to I-79 / Monroe Street / Charles Street	Northern terminus of WV 131
Bingamon Creek					Kenneth Riley Bridge	
Marion		217.8	350.5		WV 218 north – Farmington	Southern terminus of WV 218
Marion		218.2	351.2		CR 27 to I-79	
Marion	Fairmont	224.6	361.5		WV 310 south (Fourth Street) to I-79 / US 250	Northern terminus of WV 310
Marion	Fairmont	225.0	362.1		US 250 (Cleveland Avenue) to WV 310 / I-79	West end of US 250 overlap; "To WV 310/I-79" signed southbound only
Marion	Fairmont	225.1	362.3		US 250 south (Fairmont Avenue) to WV 310	
Marion	Fairmont	225.2	362.4		Jefferson Street (US 250 north) to US 19 south	Northbound signage; east end of US 250 overlap
Marion	Fairmont	225.2	362.4		Jefferson Street to I-79	Southbound signage; east end of US 250 overlap
Monongalia		241.5– 241.7	388.7– 389.0		I-79 – Fairmont, Washington	I-79 exit 152
Monongalia	Westover	242.9	390.9		WV 100 north (Holland Avenue)	Southern terminus of WV 100
Monongalia	Monongahela River	243.6– 243.7	392.0– 392.2		Joseph C. Bartolo Memorial Bridge	
Monongalia	Morgantown	243.7	392.2		US 119 north / WV 7 east (Pleasant Street) US 119 south (University Avenue) to I-68	South end of US 119/WV 7 overlap; Pleasant St. is one-way, outbound access only
Monongalia	Morgantown	243.8	392.4		US 119 / WV 7 (Walnut Street)	One-way street, inbound access only; north end of US 119/WV 7 overlap
Monongalia	Morgantown	245.8	395.6		WV 705 east (Patteson Drive) / WVU Coliseum	Western terminus of WV 705
Monongalia	Osage	247.2	397.8		Chaplin Hill Road (CR 1924) to I-79 – Fairmont, Washington PA	Cities signed southbound only
Monongalia		249.0	400.7		WV 7 west (Mason Dixon Highway) – Blacksville, Wadestown	North end of WV 7 overlap
Monongalia		252.6	406.5		WV 100 south	Northern terminus of WV 100
Monongalia		253.5	408.0		US 19 north (Mt. Morris Road)	Continuation into Pennsylvania
1.000 mi = 1.609 km; 1.000 km = 0.621 mi: Concurrency terminus; Incomplete access

U.S. Route 19
Previous state: Virginia	West Virginia	Next state: Pennsylvania
