= West Virginia Route 3 =

State highway in West Virginia, United States

West Virginia Route 3

Route information
- Maintained by WVDOH
- Length: 186.0 mi (299.3 km)
- Existed: Early 1930s–present

Major junctions
- West end: WV 10 in West Hamlin
- US 119 between Julian and Danville; I-64 Toll / I-77 Toll near Beckley; WV 16 in Beckley; US 19 between Beckley and Shady Spring; WV 20 near Hinton; US 219 in Union
- East end: WV 311 at Sweet Springs

Location
- Country: United States
- State: West Virginia
- Counties: Lincoln, Boone, Raleigh, Summers, Greenbrier, Monroe

Highway system
- West Virginia State Highway System; Interstate; US; State
← WV 2	→ WV 4

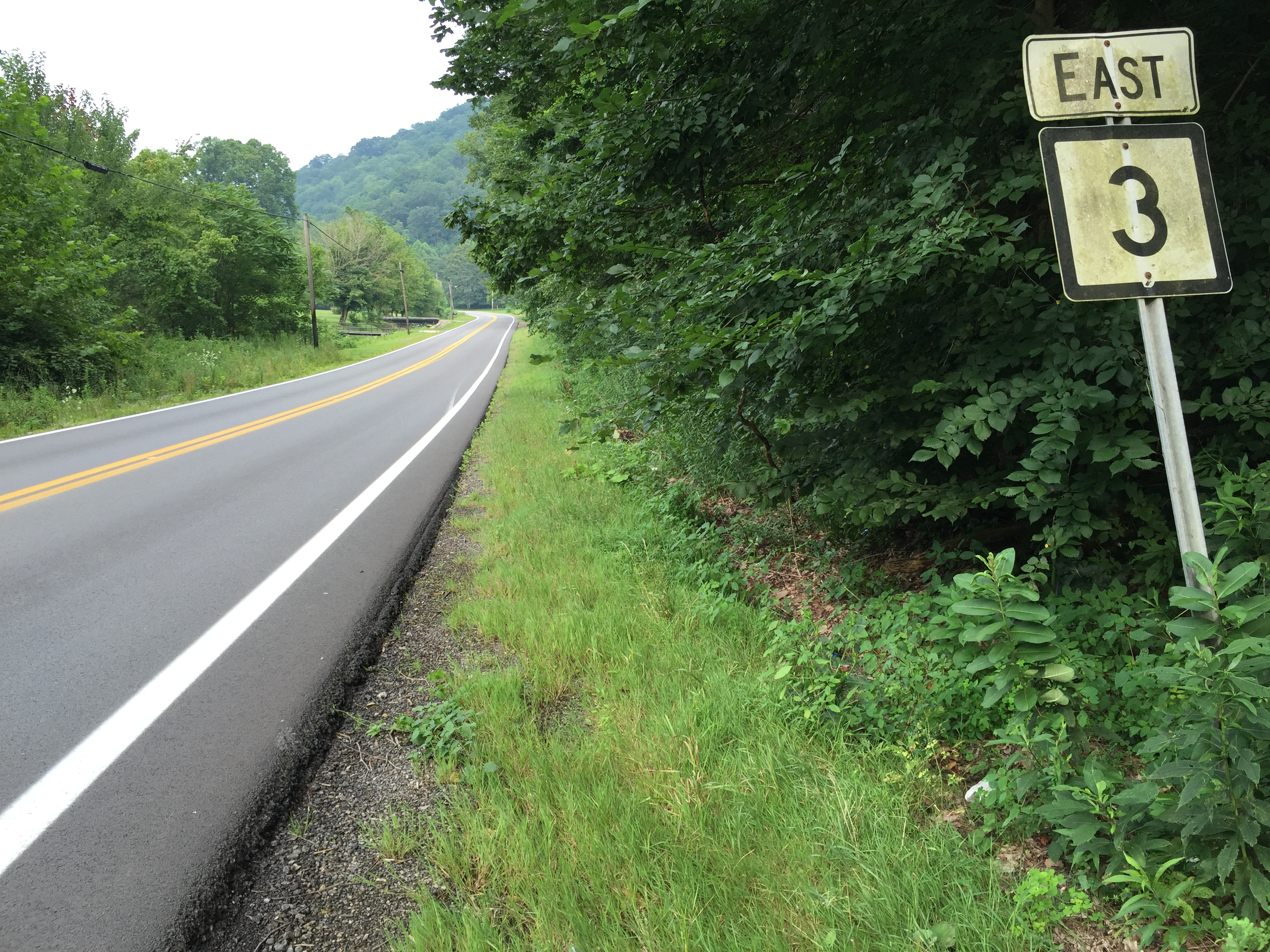
View east along WV 3 just east of US 119 in Boone County

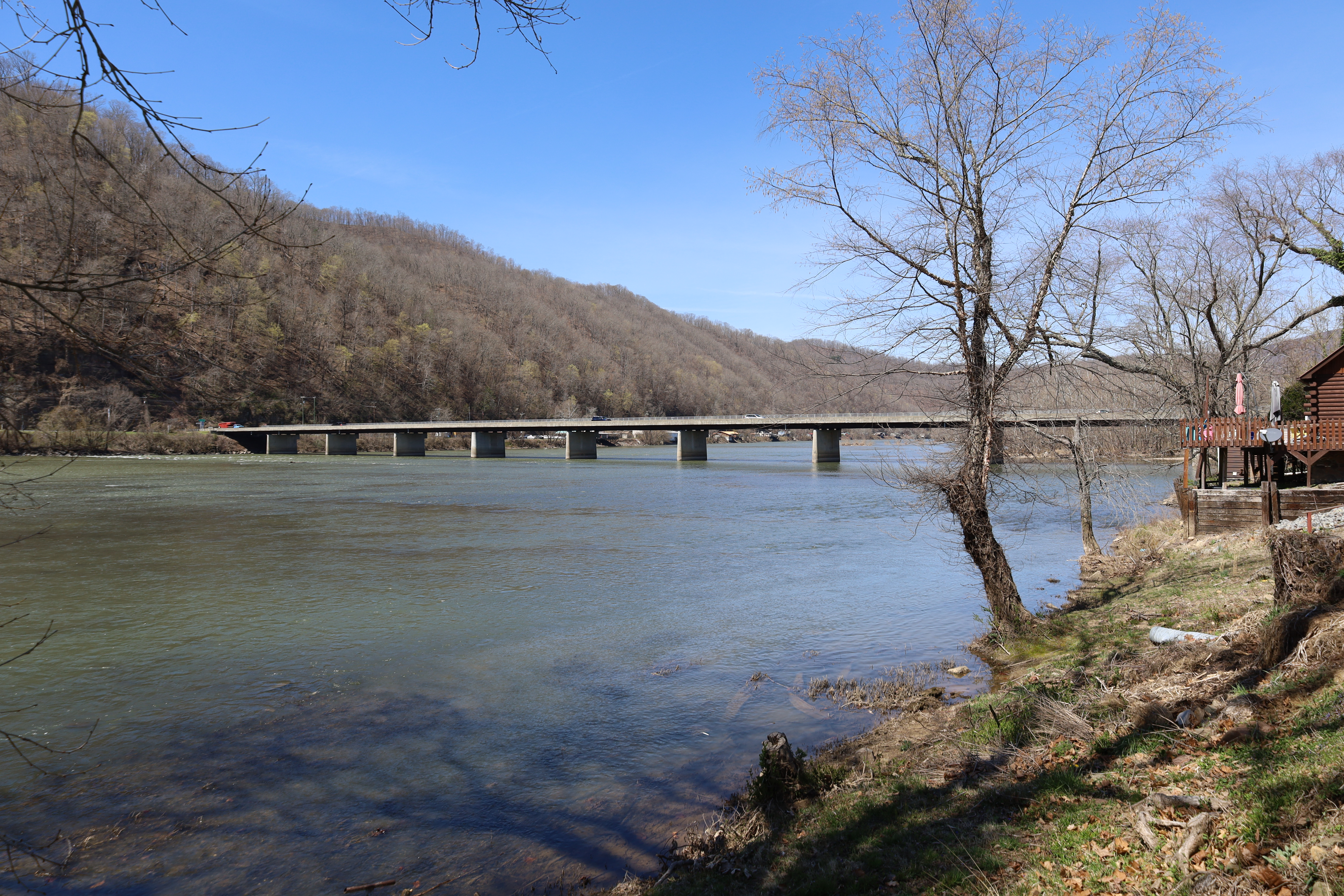
WV 3 crosses the New River at Bellepoint.

West Virginia Route 3 is a state highway in the U.S. state of West Virginia. It runs from West Virginia Route 10 in West Hamlin in a general easterly direction via Beckley to West Virginia Route 311 at Sweet Springs, most of the way across the state.

Route 3 crosses a particularly large part of the state's landscape. It goes through many counties including Monroe, Greenbrier, Summers, Raleigh, Boone, and Lincoln. At least two state parks are along the route. Moncove Lake State Park, in the southeastern part of the state, is just a few miles off the main road near Gap Mills. Little Beaver State Park is in Beaver, near the major city of Beckley.

WV 3 overlaps U.S. Route 119 in Boone County north of Madison and U.S. Route 219 from Union north to Pickaway.

== Major intersections ==
County	Location	mi	km	Destinations	Notes
Lincoln	West Hamlin			WV 10	
Lincoln				WV 34 north – Hurricane	
Lincoln	Yawkey			WV 214 north	
Boone	Julian			US 119 north – Charleston	west end of US 119 overlap
Boone	Rock Creek			US 119 south / CR 119/65 (Skeens Drive) – Madison, Logan	east end of US 119 overlap
Boone	Racine			WV 94 north – Charleston	
Raleigh	Glen Daniel			WV 99 west – Oceana, Madison	
Raleigh				WV 305 south – Lester	
Raleigh	Beckley			I-64 / I-77 – Charleston, Bluefield, Lewisburg	I-77 exit 44
Raleigh	Beckley			WV 16 (Robert C. Byrd Drive) to I-77 / US 19 – Bradley	overlap with WV 16 north (westbound only)
Raleigh	Beckley			US 19 north to I-64	west end of US 19 overlap
Raleigh	Beaver			WV 307 east to I-64 – Airport	
Raleigh				WV 307 west	
Raleigh	Shady Spring			US 19 south – Princeton	east end of US 19 overlap
Summers				WV 20 north to I-64 – Hinton	west end of WV 20 overlap
Summers				WV 20 south – Athens	east end of WV 20 overlap
Summers	Hinton			WV 107 north – Hinton	
Summers				WV 12 south – Peterstown	west end of WV 12 overlap
Greenbrier	Alderson			WV 12 north to I-64 / WV 63 – Alta	east end of WV 12 overlap
Monroe	Pickaway			US 219 north – Lewisburg	west end of US 219 overlap
Monroe	Union			US 219 south – Rich Creek, VA	east end of US 219 overlap
Monroe	Sweet Springs			WV 311 – White Sulphur Springs, Salem, VA	
1.000 mi = 1.609 km; 1.000 km = 0.621 mi: Concurrency terminus
