= West Virginia Route 307 =

State highway in West Virginia, United States

West Virginia Route 307

Route information
- Maintained by WVDOH
- Length: 8.4 mi (13.5 km)

Major junctions
- West end: US 19 / WV 3 in Beaver
- East end: US 19 / WV 3 near Daniels

Location
- Country: United States
- State: West Virginia
- Counties: Raleigh

Highway system
- West Virginia State Highway System; Interstate; US; State
← WV 305	→ WV 310

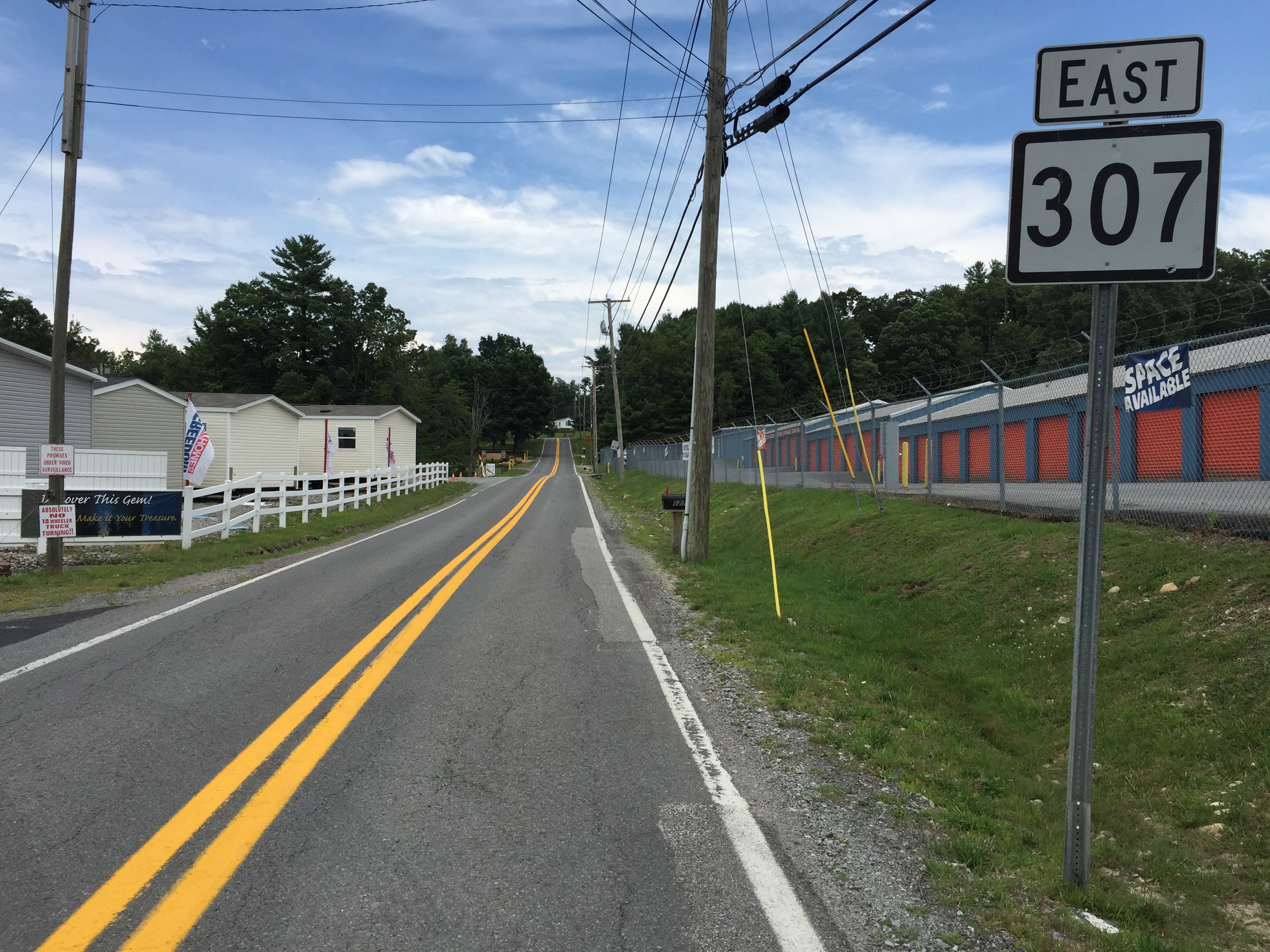
View east along WV 307 at CR 9/9 in Clifftop

West Virginia Route 307 is an east–west state highway located entirely within Raleigh County, West Virginia. The route takes on the shape of a loop, stretching from U.S. Route 19 and West Virginia Route 3 in Beaver in the west and US 19 and WV 3 southeast of Daniels in the east.

The loop provides access to Little Beaver State Park and the Raleigh County Memorial Airport from US 19 and WV 3.

== Major intersections ==
The entire route is in Raleigh County.

Location	mi	km	Destinations	Notes
Beaver			US 19 / WV 3	
			CR 9/9 (Airport Road) to I-64 – Beckley, Lewisburg, Airport	
			CR 9 (Grandview Road) to I-64 – Grandview Park	
			US 19 / WV 3 – Hinton, Princeton, Beckley	
1.000 mi = 1.609 km; 1.000 km = 0.621 mi
