= West Virginia Route 100 =

State highway in West Virginia, United States

West Virginia Route 100

Route information
- Maintained by WVDOH
- Length: 9.5 mi (15.3 km)

Major junctions
- South end: US 19 in Westover
- North end: US 19 west of Maidsville

Location
- Country: United States
- State: West Virginia
- Counties: Monongalia

Highway system
- West Virginia State Highway System; Interstate; US; State
← WV 99	→ WV 101

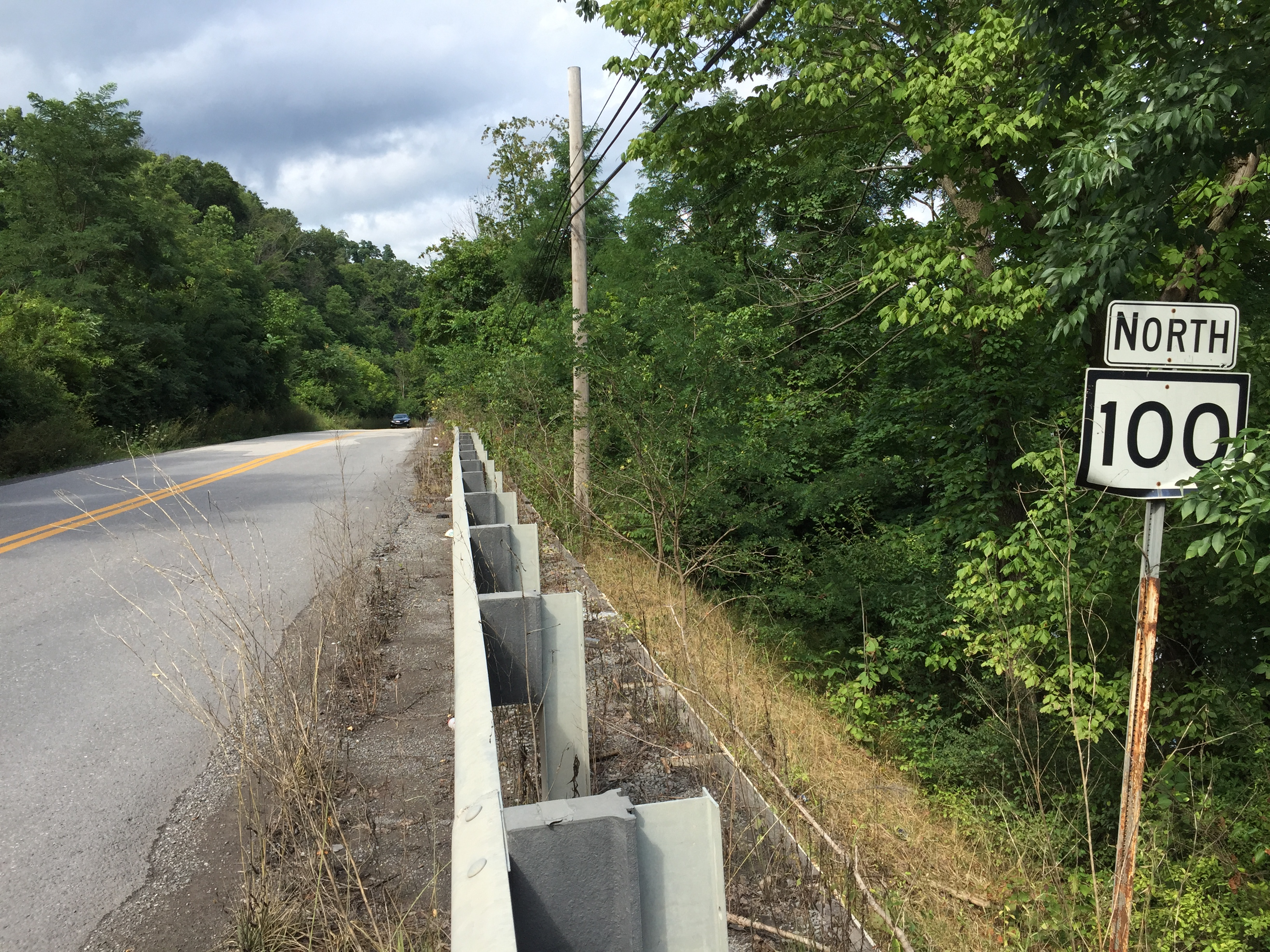
View north along WV 100 at CR 19/25 (Scotts Run Road) in Bertha Hill

West Virginia Route 100 is a north–south state highway located entirely within Monongalia County, West Virginia. The southern terminus of the route is at U.S. Route 19 in Westover, located on the opposite (west) bank of the Monongahela River of Morgantown. The northern terminus is at US 19 five miles (8 km) northwest of Maidsville.

== History ==
WV 100 was the prior route of US 19 prior to the construction of the Star City Bridge over the Monongahela River, which crosses over WV 100 about 1/3 of the way from its southern terminus, in about 1950. Prior to that time, there was no river crossing into Morgantown other than the Westover Bridge.

== Major intersections ==
The entire route is in Monongalia County.

Location	mi	km	Destinations	Notes
Westover			US 19 to I-79	
			CR 53 (Fort Martin Road)	to former PA 121
			US 19	
1.000 mi = 1.609 km; 1.000 km = 0.621 mi
