= West Virginia Route 104 =

State highway in West Virginia, United States

West Virginia Route 104

Route information
- Maintained by WVDOH
- Length: 1.2 mi (1.9 km)

Major junctions
- West end: WV 20 in Princeton
- US 19 in Princeton
- East end: US 460 in Princeton

Location
- Country: United States
- State: West Virginia
- Counties: Mercer

Highway system
- West Virginia State Highway System; Interstate; US; State
← WV 103	→ WV 105

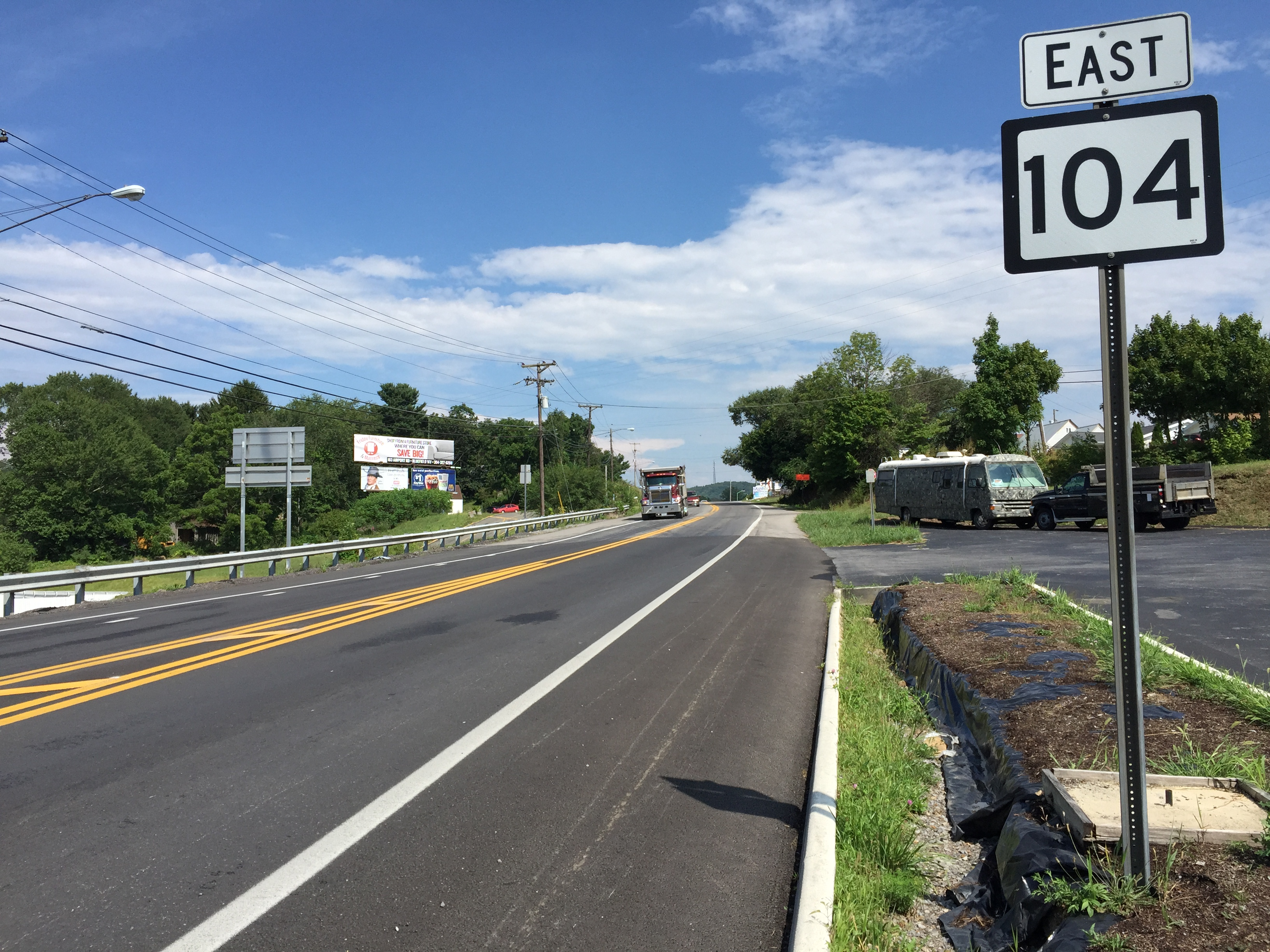
View east along WV 104 at WV 20 in Princeton

West Virginia Route 104 is an east–west state highway located in the Princeton, West Virginia area. The western terminus of the route is at West Virginia Route 20 west of downtown. The eastern terminus is at U.S. Route 460 on the eastern outskirts of Princeton a half-mile west of the West Virginia Turnpike. The portion along Oakvale Road, east of the intersection with WV 20, is a former alignment of US 460 before Corridor Q was built.

== Major intersections ==
The entire route is in Mercer County.

Location	mi	km	Destinations	Notes
Princeton			WV 20	
Princeton			US 19 south	west end of US 19 overlap
Princeton			US 19 north	east end of US 19 overlap
Princeton			WV 20 – Downtown Princeton, Athens, Pipestem Resort State Park	
			US 460 to I-77 – Pearisburg, VA, Bluefield	
1.000 mi = 1.609 km; 1.000 km = 0.621 mi: Concurrency terminus
