= West Virginia Route 98 =

State highway in West Virginia, United States

West Virginia Route 98

Route information
- Maintained by WVDOH
- Length: 6.1 mi (9.8 km)

Major junctions
- West end: US 50 near Clarksburg
- US 19 in Clarksburg
- East end: WV 20 in Nutter Fort

Location
- Country: United States
- State: West Virginia
- Counties: Harrison

Highway system
- West Virginia State Highway System; Interstate; US; State
← WV 97	→ WV 99

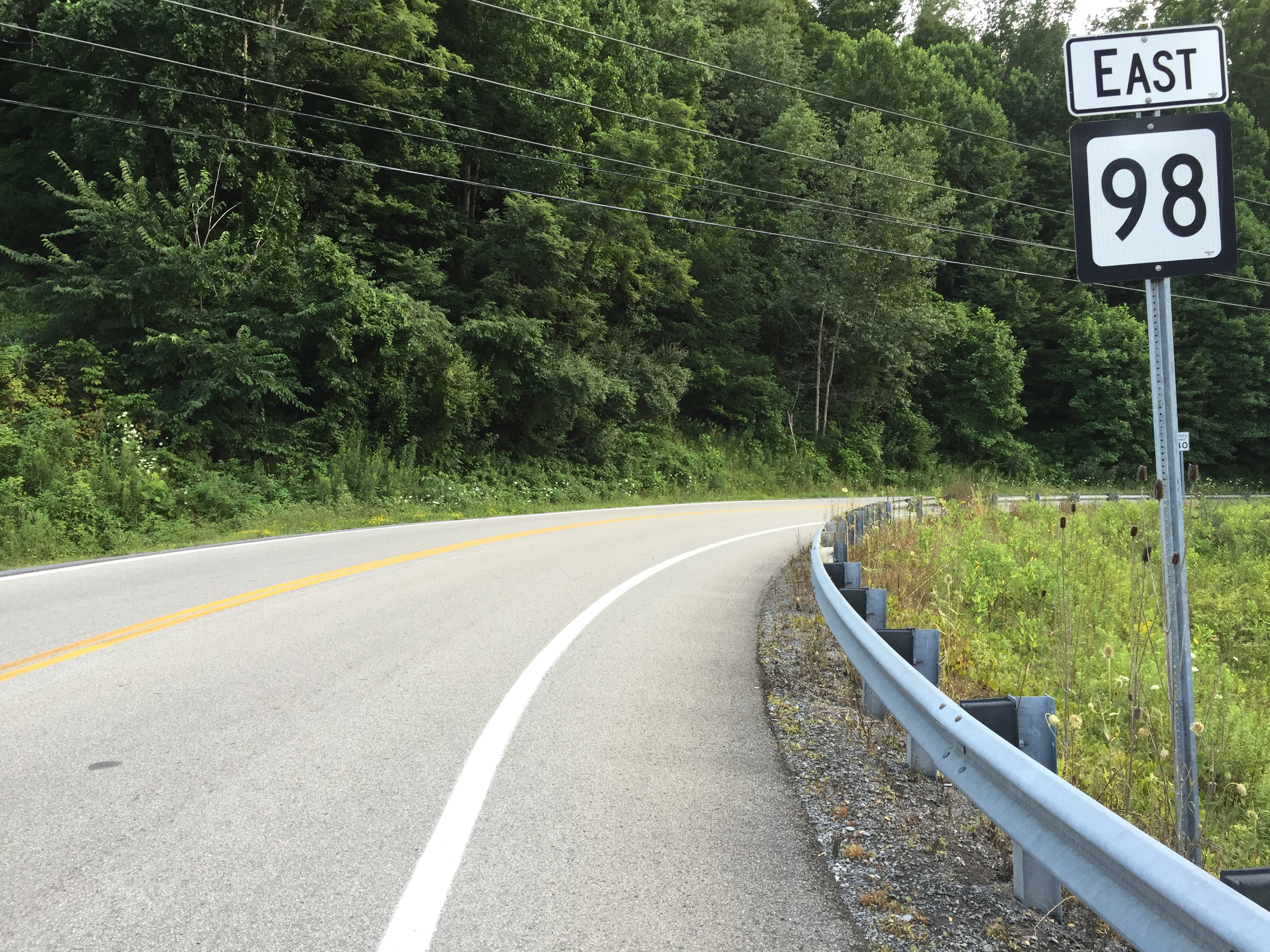
View east along WV 98 at US 50 in Wilsonburg

West Virginia Route 98 is an east–west state highway located in the Clarksburg, West Virginia area. The western terminus of the route is at U.S. Route 50 west of Clarksburg. The eastern terminus is at West Virginia Route 20 in Nutter Fort, immediately south of Clarksburg.

== Major intersections ==
The entire route is in Harrison County.

Location	mi	km	Destinations	Notes
			US 50 – Parkersburg, Clarksburg	
Clarksburg			US 19 south – West Milford, Weston	west end of US 19 overlap
Clarksburg			US 19 north – Clarksburg	east end of US 19 overlap
Nutter Fort			WV 20 – Clarksburg, Nutter Fort, Buckhannon	
1.000 mi = 1.609 km; 1.000 km = 0.621 mi: Concurrency terminus
