= West Virginia Route 107 =

State highway in West Virginia, United States

West Virginia Route 107

Route information
- Maintained by WVDOH
- Length: 1.8 mi (2.9 km)

Major junctions
- South end: WV 3 in Hinton
- North end: WV 20 in Hinton

Location
- Country: United States
- State: West Virginia
- Counties: Summers

Highway system
- West Virginia State Highway System; Interstate; US; State
← WV 106	→ WV 108

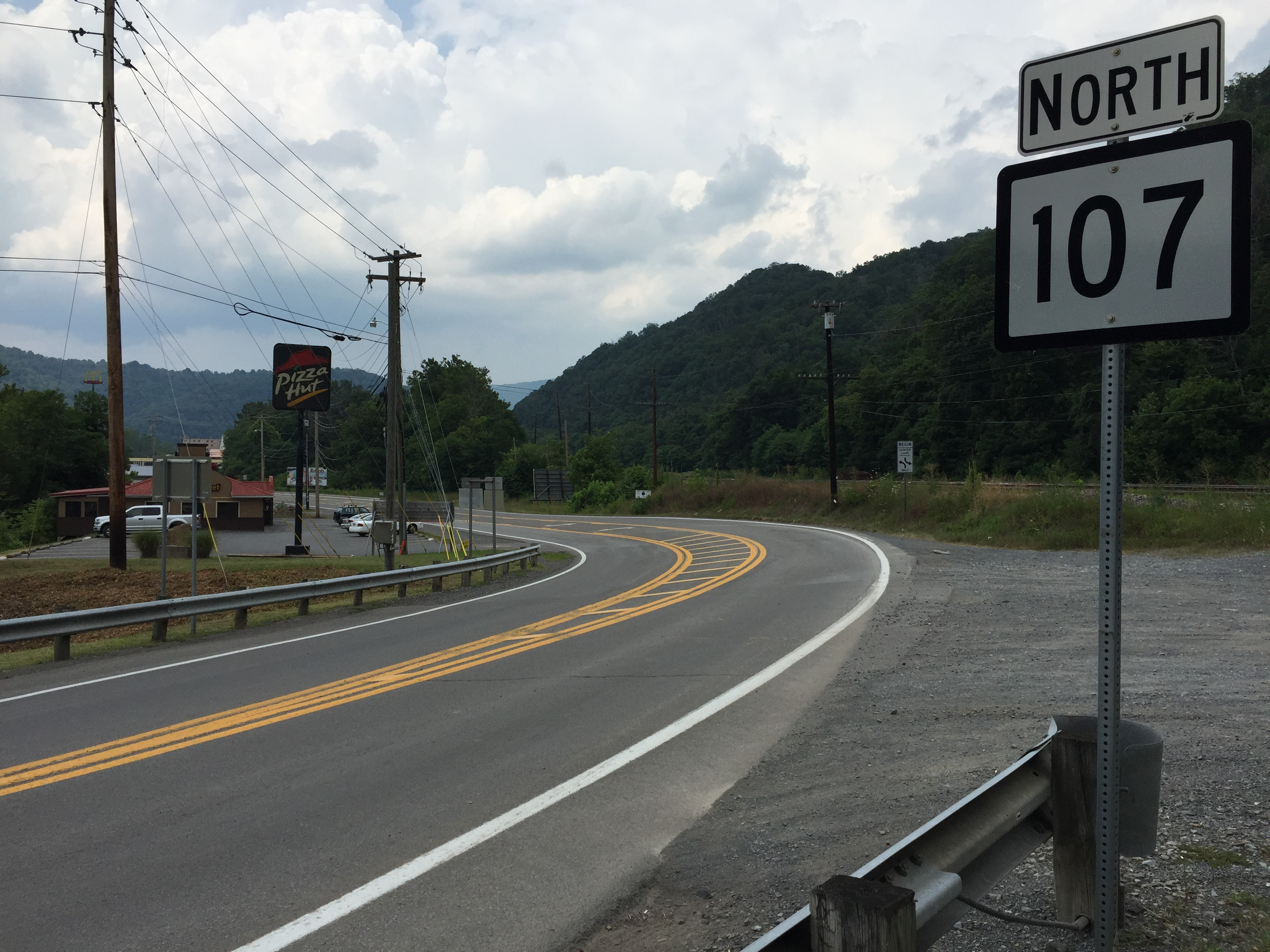
View north along WV 107 just north of WV 3 in Hinton

West Virginia Route 107 is a north–south state highway located entirely within Hinton, West Virginia, United States. The southern terminus of the route is at West Virginia Route 3 in the Bellepoint neighborhood of southern Hinton. The northern terminus is at West Virginia Route 20 in the city center. WV 107 is a former alignment of WV 20.

== Major intersections ==
The entire route is in Hinton, Summers County.

mi	km	Destinations	Notes
		WV 3	
		WV 20	
1.000 mi = 1.609 km; 1.000 km = 0.621 mi
