= West Virginia Route 310 =

State highway in West Virginia, United States

West Virginia Route 310

Route information
- Maintained by WVDOH
- Length: 16.2 mi (26.1 km)

Major junctions
- South end: US 50 in Grafton
- I-79 at Fairmont; US 250 in Fairmont
- North end: US 19 in Fairmont

Location
- Country: United States
- State: West Virginia
- Counties: Taylor, Marion

Highway system
- West Virginia State Highway System; Interstate; US; State
← WV 307	→ WV 311

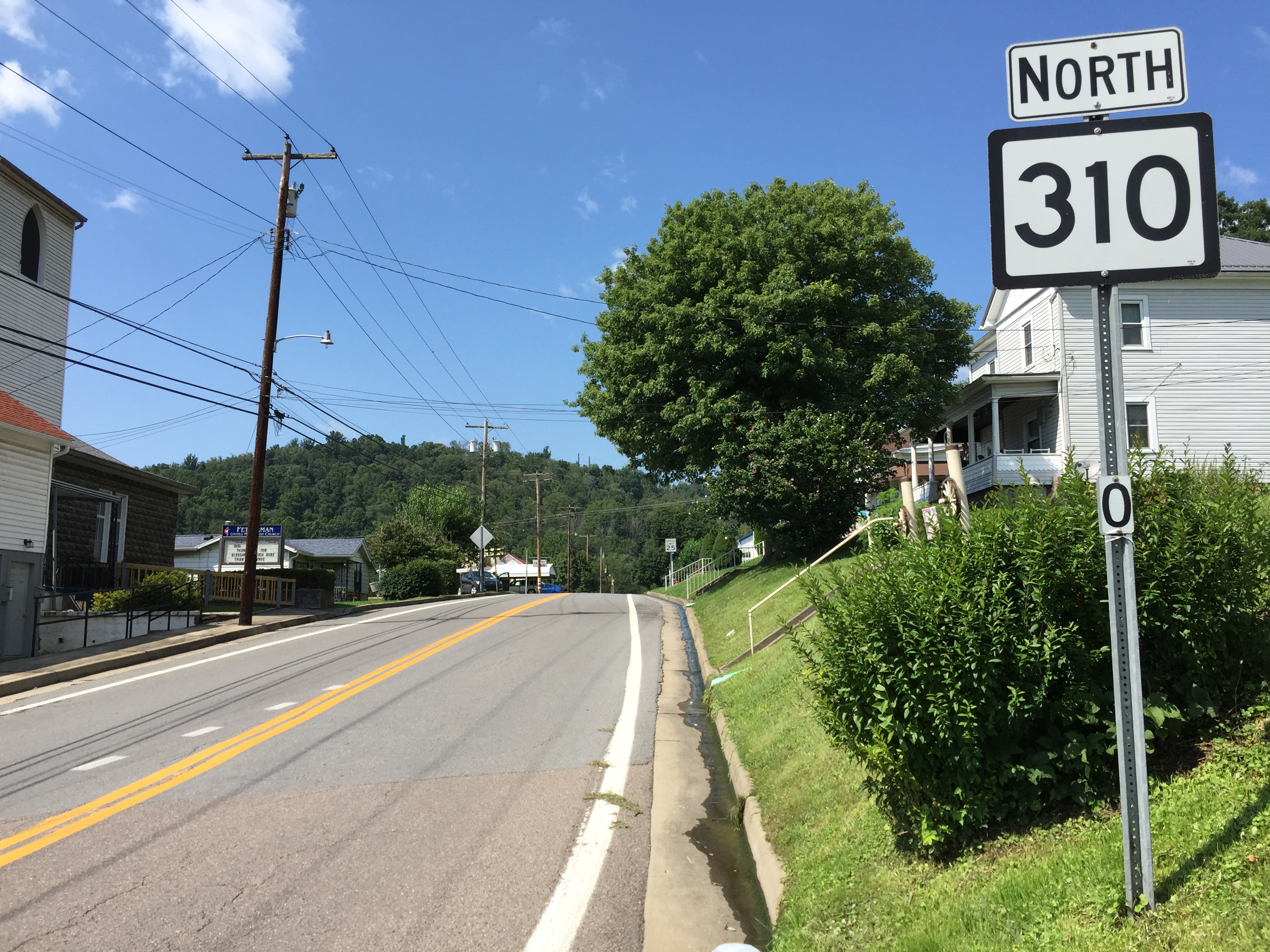
View north along WV 310 at US 50 in Grafton

West Virginia Route 310 is a north–south state highway located in northern West Virginia. The southern terminus of the route is at U.S. Route 50 in Grafton. The northern terminus is at U.S. Route 19 in Fairmont.

WV 310 is a two-lane road that traverses a mostly country setting, with sharp turns and occasional steep inclines. It runs through the unincorporated town of Quiet Dell (Marion County) and also provides access to Valley Falls State Park. The southern portion is located in Taylor County and the northern portion is located in Marion County. It crosses the county line near the entrance to Valley Falls State Park.

Virtually all of the residences in the immediate area are occupied by a single family. Homes generally have large amounts of acreage that commonly back up to wooded areas. WV 310 runs through an area that has seen moderate growth with the development of some upscale neighborhoods such as South Point, Bunners Ridge, Timber Ridge, and Rock Lake.

WV-310 is also a main thoroughfare for individuals traveling between East Fairmont and Grafton.

WV 310 was formerly County Route 31 in Marion County and County Route 5 in Taylor County. The route's northern terminus was originally at US 250 in Fairmont, but it was extended in 2017 over the new Third Street bridge over Coal Run to US 19.

== Major intersections ==
County	Location	mi	km	Destinations	Notes
Taylor	Grafton			US 50 – Tygart Lake State Park	
Marion	Fairmont			CR 31/1 (Stony Road)	to WV 273
Marion				I-79 – Clarksburg, Morgantown	I-79 exit 137
Marion	Fairmont			Speedway Avenue	former WV 73 north
Marion	Fairmont			WV 273 south to I-79 / Robert H. Mollohan-Jefferson Street Bridge	
Marion	Fairmont			Third Street Bridge over Monongahela River	
Marion	Fairmont			US 250 (Fairmont Avenue) to I-79	
Marion	Fairmont			US 19 (Locust Avenue)	
1.000 mi = 1.609 km; 1.000 km = 0.621 mi
