= West Virginia Route 99 =

State highway in West Virginia, United States

West Virginia Route 99

Route information
- Maintained by WVDOH
- Length: 13.8 mi (22.2 km)

Major junctions
- West end: WV 85 near Kopperston
- East end: WV 3 in Glen Daniel

Location
- Country: United States
- State: West Virginia
- Counties: Boone, Raleigh, Wyoming

Highway system
- West Virginia State Highway System; Interstate; US; State
← WV 98	→ WV 100

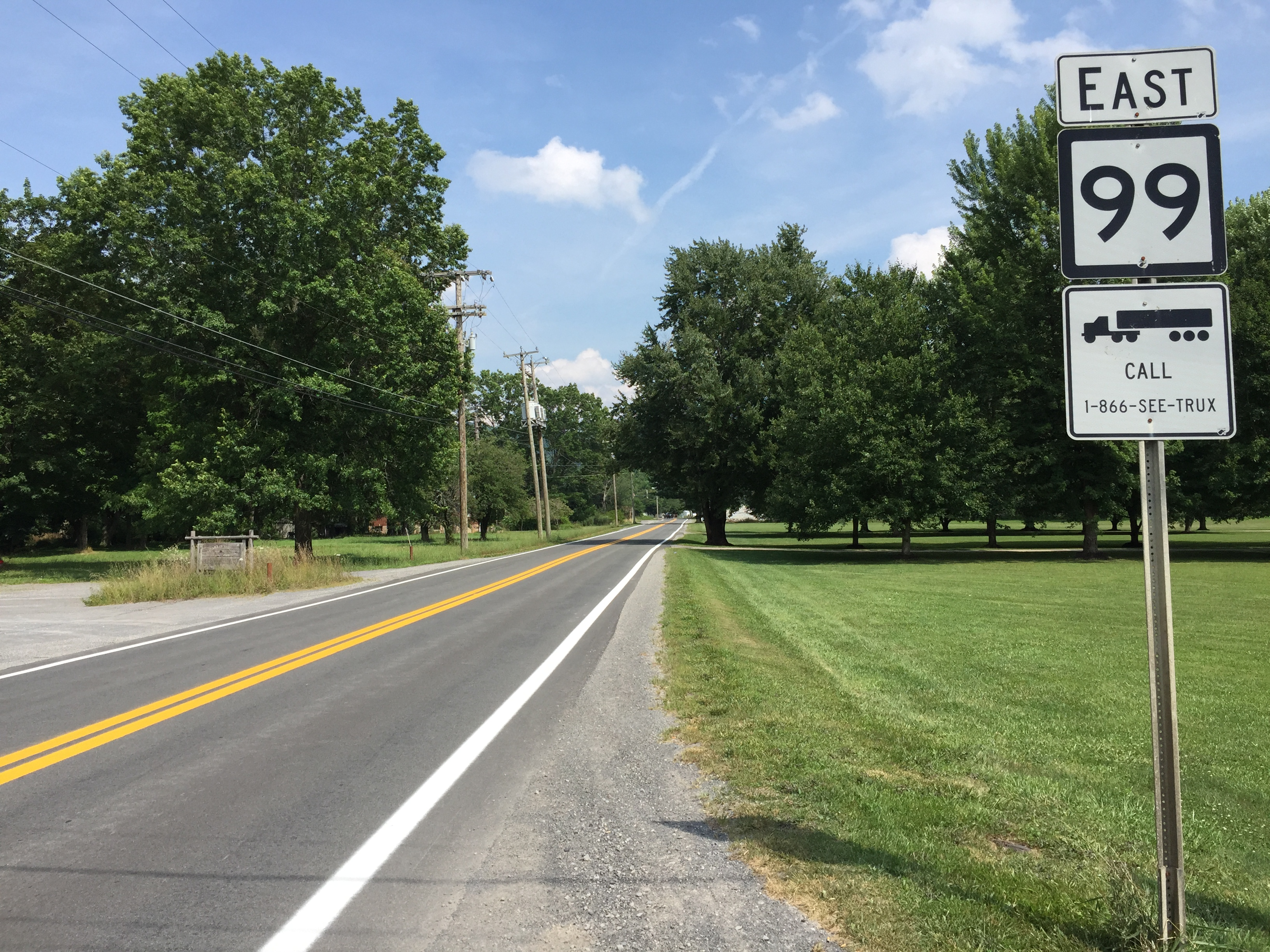
View east along WV 99 at CR 1/5 in Bolt

West Virginia Route 99 is an east–west state highway in southern West Virginia. The western terminus of the route is at West Virginia Route 85 northeast of Kopperston in the rural southeast corner of Boone County. The eastern terminus is at West Virginia Route 3 in Glen Daniel.

The section of WV 99 west of Bolt was constructed after 1968. Most of this stretch, approximately the westernmost 8 miles (13 km), is built in a nearly continuous series of cuts in the side of Guyandotte Mountain.

== Major intersections ==
County	Location	mi	km	Destinations	Notes
Boone				WV 85 – Oceana, Madison	
Raleigh	Glen Daniel			WV 3 – Beckley, Whitesville	
1.000 mi = 1.609 km; 1.000 km = 0.621 mi
