= U.S. Route 60 in West Virginia =

Segment of American highway

U.S. Route 60
- Midland Trail
- US 60 highlighted in red

Route information
- Maintained by WVDOH
- Length: 177.8 mi (286.1 km)
- Existed: 1926–present

Major junctions
- West end: US 60 in Catlettsburg, KY
- US 52 in Huntington; I-64 in Barboursville; I-64 in South Charleston; US 119 in Charleston; I-64 Toll / I-77 Toll in Charleston; US 19 at Hico; I-64 near Sam Black Church; US 219 in Lewisburg; WV 92 in White Sulphur Springs; I-64 near White Sulphur Springs
- East end: I-64 / US 60 near Callaghan, VA

Location
- Country: United States
- State: West Virginia
- Counties: Wayne, Cabell, Putnam, Kanawha, Fayette, Greenbrier

Highway system
- United States Numbered Highway System; List; Special; Divided; West Virginia State Highway System; Interstate; US; State
← WV 59	→ WV 61

U.S. Route 60 (US 60) runs northwest to southeast across the central and southern portions of West Virginia. It runs from the Kentucky state line at Catlettsburg, Kentucky, and Kenova. The road passes through Huntington, Charleston, and White Sulphur Springs. The route exits the state into Virginia, running concurrently with Interstate 64 (I-64) east of White Sulphur Springs. Most of US 60's route through West Virginia is part of and even signed in several areas as the Midland Trail, a National Scenic Byway.

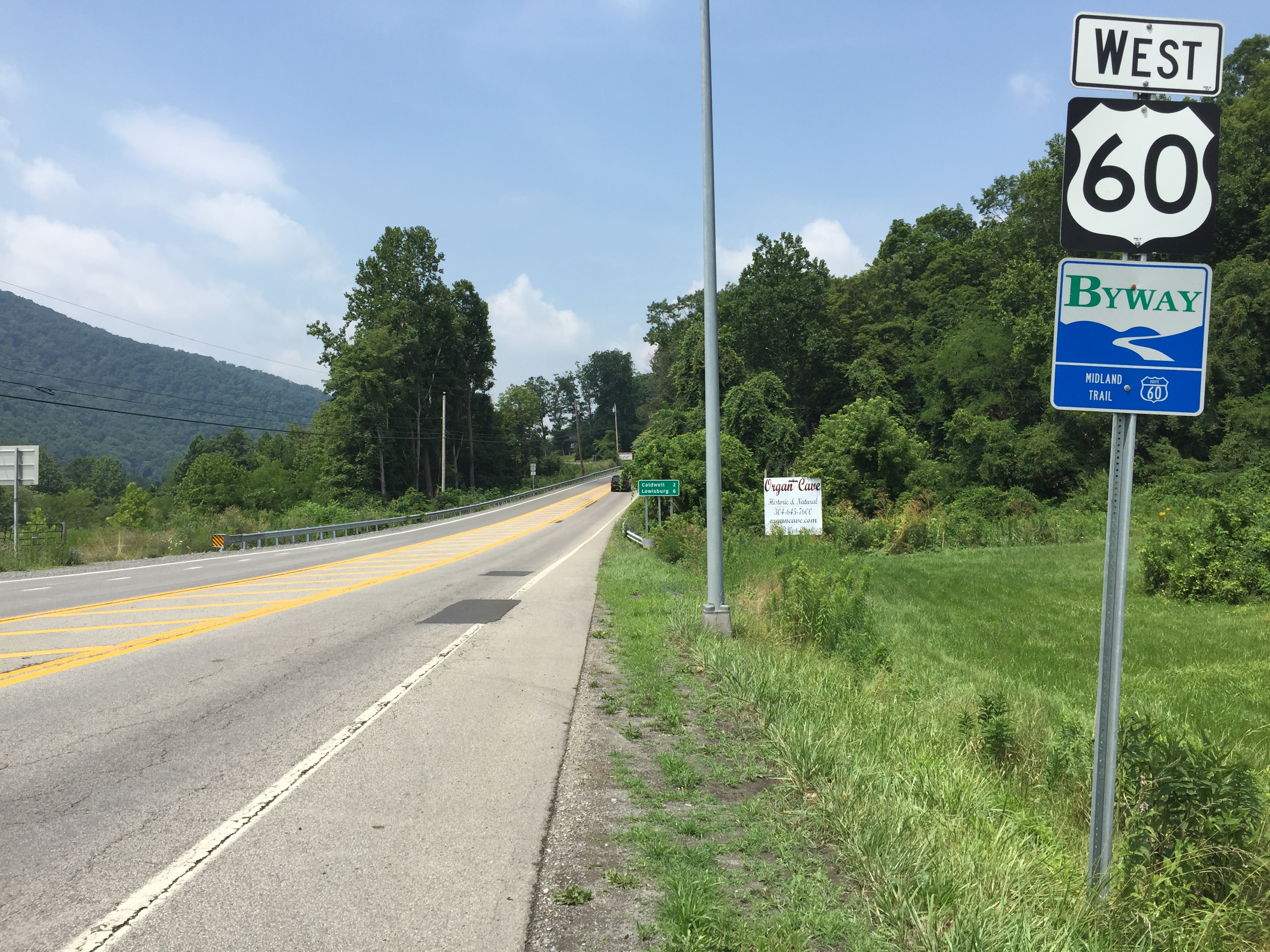
View west along US 60 at CR 60/14 departing White Sulphur Springs

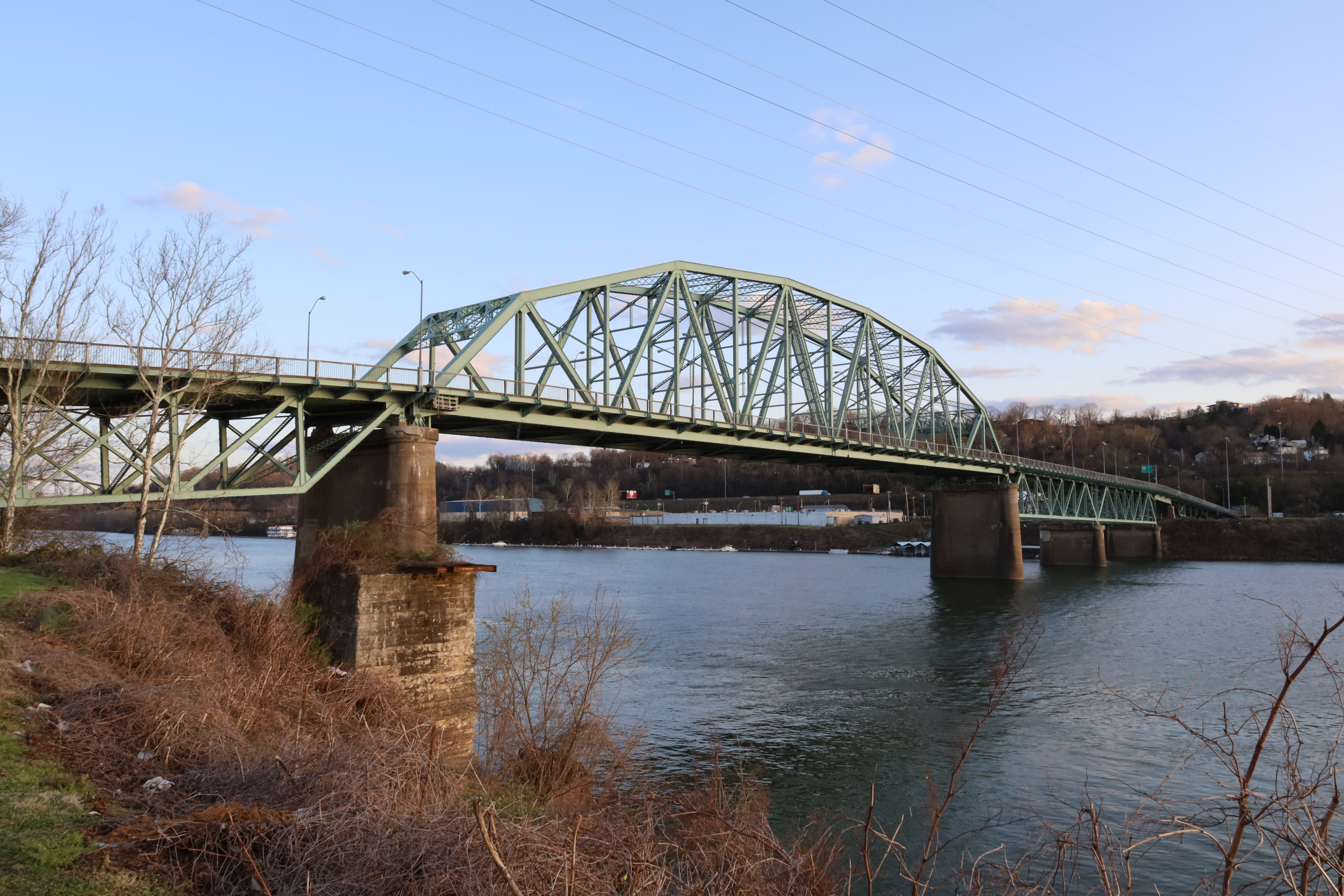
US 60 crossing the Kanawha River at the Patrick Street Bridge in Charleston

== Route description ==
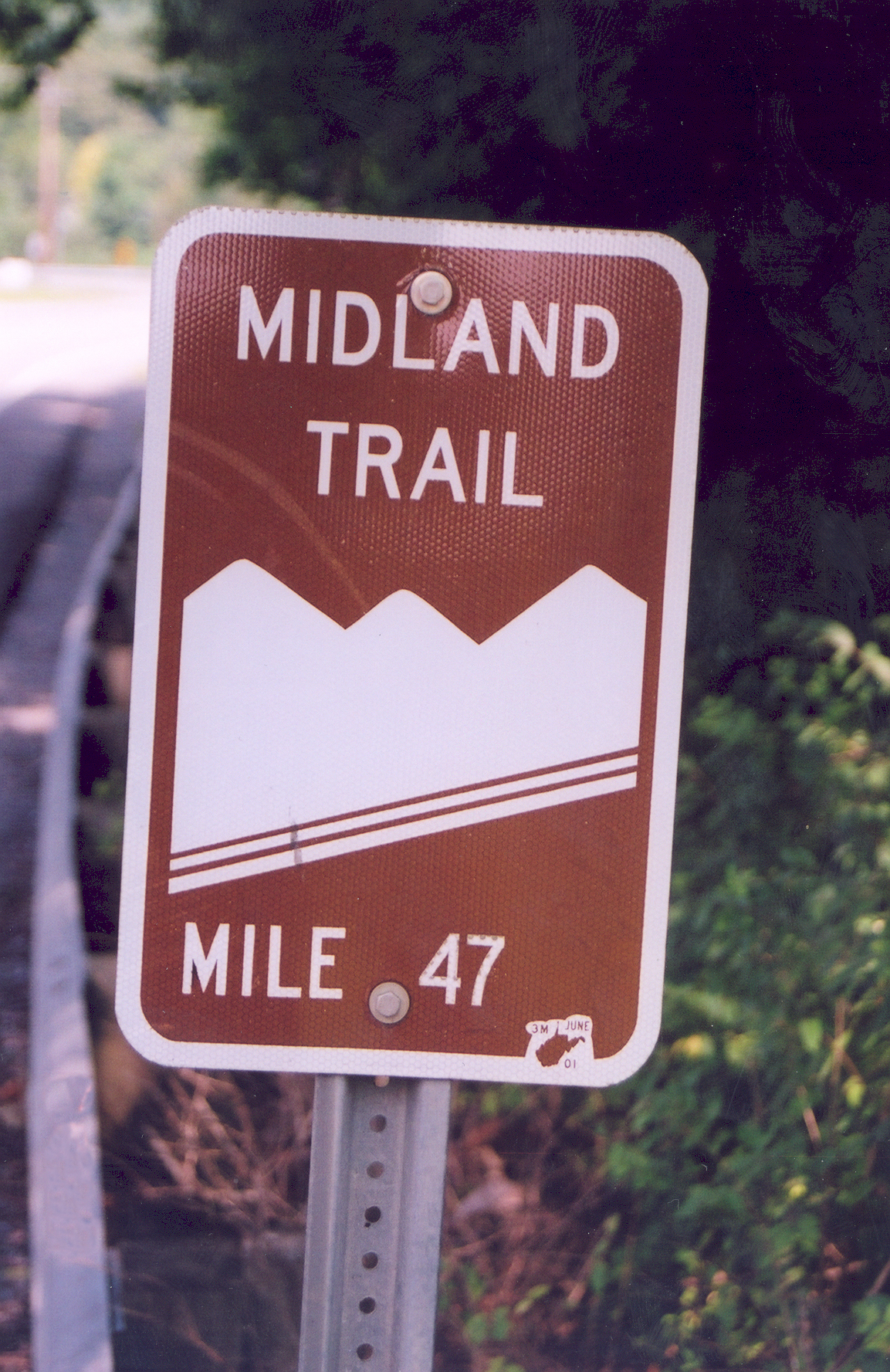
A sign for Midland Trail in Ansted

The Midland Trail is a National Scenic Byway which follows US 60 through a portion of the Southern West Virginia between Charleston and Sam Black Church. It was part of the longer transcontinental Midland Trail. In this area, the Midland Trail follows the route of the historic James River and Kanawha Turnpike, an early road linking canals in the James River in Virginia with the navigable portion of the Kanawha River in West Virginia.

The Midland Trail crosses some of the most rugged terrain of the Mountain State. The trail extends for approximately 100 miles (160 km) from White Sulphur Springs in the east to Charleston in the west. The trail is believed to have been originally carved into the mountains by buffalo and native peoples. In 1790, George Washington ordered the trail cleared. The trail came to be traveled by stage coaches and soldiers in the Civil War.

Prior to 1988, the Midland Trail was heavily traveled, particularly by commercial vehicles, including large trucks transporting coal and timber. Traffic was significantly reduced in 1988 when the final section of I-64 was completed.

Although considerably shorter than the Interstate Highway routing via the West Virginia Turnpike, these days, the Midland Trail serves mostly local traffic and shunpikers seeking a bucolic interlude. It passes through both the Kanawha River Valley and the plateau high above. Due to the mountain switchbacks and long, steep grades, drivers of recreational vehicles and inexperienced drivers are advised to use extra caution, particularly during inclement weather conditions.

== Major intersections ==
County	Location	mi	km	Destinations	Notes
Big Sandy River		0.000– 0.085	0.000– 0.137	US 60 west (35th Street)	Continuation into Kentucky
Big Sandy River		0.000– 0.085	0.000– 0.137	Billy C. Clark Bridge	
Wayne	Kenova	1.2	1.9	WV 75 east (14th Street) to I-64	Western terminus of WV 75; serves Tri-State Airport
Cabell	Huntington	6.5– 6.6	10.5– 10.6	US 52 to I-64 – Ironton OH	Interchange
Cabell	Huntington	8.5	13.7	WV 527 (5th Street)	One-way street, inbound access only, at-grade intersection eastbound; entrance-only interchange westbound; west end of overlap with WV 527
Cabell	Huntington	8.6	13.8	WV 527 (6th Street) to I-64	East end of overlap with WV 527; eastbound access only
Cabell	Huntington	8.8	14.2	8th Street to WV 527	Signed westbound only
Cabell	Huntington	9.5	15.3	WV 10 south (Hal Greer Boulevard) to I-64	Northern terminus of WV 10 at US 60 west
Cabell	Huntington			WV 2 north (3rd Avenue east) – Point Pleasant	Westbound access only; southern terminus of WV 2
Cabell	Huntington	11.6	18.7	US 60 west (31st Street north) to WV 2 Frank "Gunner" Gatski Memorial Bridge to SR 7 – Proctorville 5th Avenue east	
Cabell	Barboursville	14.7– 15.1	23.7– 24.3	I-64 – Ashland KY, Charleston	I-64 exit 15
Cabell	Barboursville	16.5	26.6	WV 10 Alt. south (Davis Creek Road) – West Hamlin	Northern terminus of WV 10 Alt
Cabell	Barboursville	18.2	29.3	WV 193 north (Big Ben Bowen Highway) to I-64 / Tanyard Station Drive – WV Route 2	Southern terminus of WV 193
Cabell	Barboursville	20.2	32.5	CR 8960 (East Mall Road) to I-64	
Cabell		20.8	33.5	CR 30 (Cyrus Creek Road)	
Cabell		21.4	34.4	CR 17 (Blue Sulphur Road)	
Cabell	Ona	23.0	37.0	CR 29 (Fudges Creek Road) / CR 1 (Howells Mill Road)	
Cabell	Milton	27.2	43.8	CR 9 (Newmans Branch Road) / James River Turnpike Road	
Cabell	Milton	27.5	44.3	CR 257 (Bill Blenko Drive) / CR 15 (Smith Street)	
Cabell	Milton	28.0	45.1	CR 13 to I-64	
Cabell	Culloden	29.3	47.2	CR 6039 (Morris Memorial Hospital Road)	
Cabell	Culloden	31.0	49.9	CR 251 (James River Turnpike Road)	
Putnam	Hurricane	32.9	52.9	WV 34 Bus. north (Main Street) – Downtown	Southern terminus of WV 34 Bus
Putnam	Hurricane	34.2	55.0	WV 34 north (Midland Trail) to I-64 – Hurricane	West end of WV 34 overlap
Putnam	Hurricane	34.4– 34.6	55.4– 55.7	WV 34 south (Chamblin Road) – Hamlin	East end of WV 34 overlap
Putnam		38.8	62.4	CR 6013 (Hodges Road)	
Putnam		39.6	63.7	CR 6013 (Hodges Road)	
Putnam		41.3	66.5	CR 46 (Scott Depot Road)	
Kanawha		41.3	66.5	CR 1 (Browns Creek Road)	
Kanawha	Amandaville	43.7	70.3	WV 817 north (Old Route 35) to I-64 / CR 6014 (West Main Street) – Winfield	Southern terminus of WV 817
Kanawha	Coal River	44.6– 44.7	71.8– 71.9	Earl Henry Curnutte Bridge	
Kanawha	St. Albans	45.0	72.4	Second Street (CR CR 6/16)	
Kanawha	St. Albans	45.1	72.6	WV 25 / Third Street (CR 6/15)	
Kanawha	St. Albans	46.7	75.2	Walnut Street (CR CR 160/7)	
Kanawha		48.2	77.6	CR 6014 (Kanawha Terrace)	
Kanawha	South Charleston	50.9	81.9	Rock Lake Drive	
Kanawha	South Charleston	51.1– 51.2	82.2– 82.4	Dunbar Toll Bridge / Maple Street	
Kanawha	South Charleston	52.1– 52.2	83.8– 84.0	I-64 east – Charleston	I-64 exit 54
Kanawha	South Charleston	52.3	84.2	WV 601 south (Jefferson Road) / Jefferson Road	Northern terminus of WV 601
Kanawha	South Charleston	52.5	84.5	I-64 west – Huntington	I-64 exit 54
Kanawha	South Charleston	54.2	87.2	To I-64 / Montrose Drive	
Kanawha	South Charleston–Charleston line	55.0– 55.1	88.5– 88.7	WV 61 south (MacCorkle Avenue SW)	Northern terminus of WV 61
Kanawha	Charleston	55.1– 55.4	88.7– 89.2	Patrick Street Bridge over Kanawha River	
Kanawha	Charleston	55.5	89.3	Kanawha Boulevard West	
Kanawha	Charleston	55.6	89.5	Fourth Avenue	
Kanawha	Charleston	55.7	89.6	Begin one-way segment	
Kanawha	Charleston	55.8	89.8	WV 25 west (Seventh Avenue)	Eastern terminus of WV 25
Kanawha	Charleston	55.9	90.0	US 60 west (Washington Street)	
Kanawha	Charleston	55.9	90.0	End one-way segment	
Kanawha	Charleston	57.0	91.7	Begin one-way segment	
Kanawha	Charleston	57.5	92.5	US 119 (Pennsylvania Avenue) to I-64 / I-77 / I-79 – Beckley, Huntington	
Kanawha	Charleston	58.3	93.8	Dickinson Street	
Kanawha	Charleston	58.6	94.3	US 60 west (Washington Street East) to I-64 / I-77 / I-79 / Brooks Street	
Kanawha	Charleston	58.6	94.3	End one-way segment	
Kanawha	Charleston	59.6	95.9	WV 114 (Greenbirer Street) to I-64 / I-77 / I-79 – Airport	Southern terminus of WV 114
Kanawha	Charleston	59.7	96.1	Quarrier Street	
Kanawha	Charleston	59.8	96.2	Kanawha Boulevard East	
Kanawha		61.8– 62.7	99.5– 100.9	I-64 west / I-77 north	West end of I-64/I-77 overlap; no access from I-64 east/I-77 south to US 60 west or from US 60 east to I-64 west/I-77 north; I-64/I-77 exit 97
Kanawha		62.9– 63.5	101.2– 102.2	I-64 east / I-77 south – Beckley	East end of I-64/I-77 overlap; I-64/I-77 exit 96
Kanawha		63.8	102.7	CR 73 (Campbells Creek Drive)	
Kanawha	Malden	64.3– 64.5	103.5– 103.8	CR 6012 (Midland Trail) – Malden, Rand	Interchange
Kanawha		72.8– 73.4	117.2– 118.1	To WV 61 / I-64 / I-77 – Chelyan	
Kanawha	Cedar Grove	76.8	123.6	CR 81 (Belle Creek Road) – Cedar Grove	
Kanawha	Smithers	85.0– 85.3	136.8– 137.3	To WV 61 (WV 6 south / Montgomery Bridge) – Montgomery	Interchange
Fayette	Smithers	85.7	137.9	CR 2 (Cannelton Hollow Road) / Greyhound Lane / Michigan Avenue	
Fayette	Gauley Bridge	95.8	154.2	CR 165 (Main Street)	
Fayette	Gauley Bridge	95.9– 96.0	154.3– 154.5	WV 16 north / WV 39 east – Gauley Bridge	West end of WV 16 overlap; western terminus of WV 39
Fayette	Gauley Bridge	96.0– 96.1	154.5– 154.7	Sgt. Scott Angel Memorial Bridge over Gauley River	
Fayette	Chimney Corner	100.7	162.1	WV 16 south – Fayetteville	East end of WV 16 overlap
Fayette	Hico	111.5– 111.8	179.4– 179.9	US 19 – Beckley, New River Bridge, Summersville	
Fayette		118.7	191.0	WV 41 north – Mount Nebo	West end of WV 41 overlap
Fayette		121.2	195.1	WV 41 south (Stanaford Road) – Clifftop	East end of WV 41 overlap
Greenbrier	Rainelle	131.9	212.3	WV 20 south (South Sewell Street)	West end of WV 20 overlap
Greenbrier	Rainelle	132.6	213.4	CR 6032 (James River and Kanawha Turnpike)	
Greenbrier	Charmco	136.4	219.5	WV 20 north (Coalfield Trail)	East end of WV 20 overlap
Greenbrier		146.2	235.3	CR 25 (Smoot Road) / CR 604 (Gray Gables Road)	
Greenbrier		146.4– 146.5	235.6– 235.8	I-64 – Beckley, Lewisburg	I-64 exit 156
Greenbrier		152.7	245.7	WV 12 south (Alta Drive) to I-64	Northern terminus of WV 12
Greenbrier		152.8	245.9	CR 6010 (Sinking Creek Road)	
Greenbrier	Lewisburg	163.3	262.8	US 219 (Jefferson Street) to I-64	
Greenbrier	Lewisburg	163.8	263.6	CR 451 (Holt Lane)	
Greenbrier	Caldwell	166.6	268.1	WV 63 west – Organ Cave, Rich Creek VA	Eastern terminus of WV 63; Rich Creek VA only signed westbound
Greenbrier	White Sulphur Springs	173.7	279.5	WV 92 north (Pocahontas Trail) – Green Bank	Southern terminus of WV 92
Greenbrier		174.1– 175.0	280.2– 281.6	I-64 west	West end of I-64 overlap; access only from US 60 east to I-64 east and from I-64 west to US 60 west; I-64 exit 181
Greenbrier		176.9	284.7	WV 311 south – Crows	Interchange; Eastbound exit and westbound entrance; northern terminus of WV 311; I-64 exit 183
Greenbrier		177.8	286.1	I-64 east / US 60 east – Lexington	Continuation into Virginia
1.000 mi = 1.609 km; 1.000 km = 0.621 mi: Concurrency terminus; Incomplete access
