= Melrose, West Virginia =

- Unincorporated community
- Location within the state of West Virginia Melrose, West Virginia (the United States)
- Coordinates: 37°23′12″N 81°03′15″W
- Country: United States
- State: West Virginia
- County: Mercer
- Elevation: 2,467 ft (752 m)
- Time zone: UTC-5 (Eastern (EST))
  - Summer (DST): UTC-4 (EDT)
- Area codes: 304 & 681
- GNIS feature ID: 1555107

Melrose is an unincorporated community in Mercer County, West Virginia, United States. Melrose is located at the junction of Interstate 77 and West Virginia Route 20, 3 miles (4.8 km) northeast of Princeton.
