= Johnston Town, West Virginia =

- Unincorporated community
- Location within the state of West Virginia Johnston Town, West Virginia (the United States)
- Coordinates: 37°21′28″N 81°08′29″W
- Country: United States
- State: West Virginia
- County: Mercer
- Elevation: 2,612 ft (796 m)
- Time zone: UTC-5 (Eastern (EST))
  - Summer (DST): UTC-4 (EDT)
- Area codes: 304 & 681
- GNIS feature ID: 1557237

Johnston Town is an unincorporated community in Mercer County, West Virginia, United States. Johnston Town is located on West Virginia Route 20, 2 miles (3.2 km) east-southeast of Princeton.
