= Canfield, West Virginia =

Canfield is the name of several unincorporated communities in the U.S. state of West Virginia.

- Canfield, Braxton County, West Virginia
- Canfield, Randolph County, West Virginia
