= Meadowbrook, Harrison County, West Virginia =

- Unincorporated community
- Location within West Virginia Location within the United States
- Coordinates: 39°21′06″N 80°19′07″W
- Country: United States
- State: West Virginia
- County: Harrison
- Elevation: 968 ft (295 m)
- Time zone: UTC-5 (Eastern (EST))
  - Summer (DST): UTC-4 (EDT)
- ZIP code: 26404
- Area codes: 304 & 681
- GNIS feature ID: 1555097

Meadowbrook is an unincorporated community in Harrison County, West Virginia, United States. Meadowbrook is located on U.S. Route 19 and West Virginia Route 20, 2 miles (3.2 km) southeast of Lumberport. Meadowbrook has a post office with ZIP code 26404.
