= Littlesburg, West Virginia =

- Unincorporated community
- Location within the state of West Virginia Littlesburg, West Virginia (the United States)
- Coordinates: 37°19′24″N 81°12′54″W
- Country: United States
- State: West Virginia
- County: Mercer
- Elevation: 2,618 ft (798 m)
- Time zone: UTC-5 (Eastern (EST))
  - Summer (DST): UTC-4 (EDT)
- Area codes: 304 & 681
- GNIS feature ID: 1554975

Littlesburg is an unincorporated community in Mercer County, West Virginia, United States. Littlesburg is located on West Virginia Route 20, 3.5 miles (5.6 km) north of Bluefield.
