= Glen Daniel, West Virginia =

Unincorporated community in West Virginia, United States

- Unincorporated community
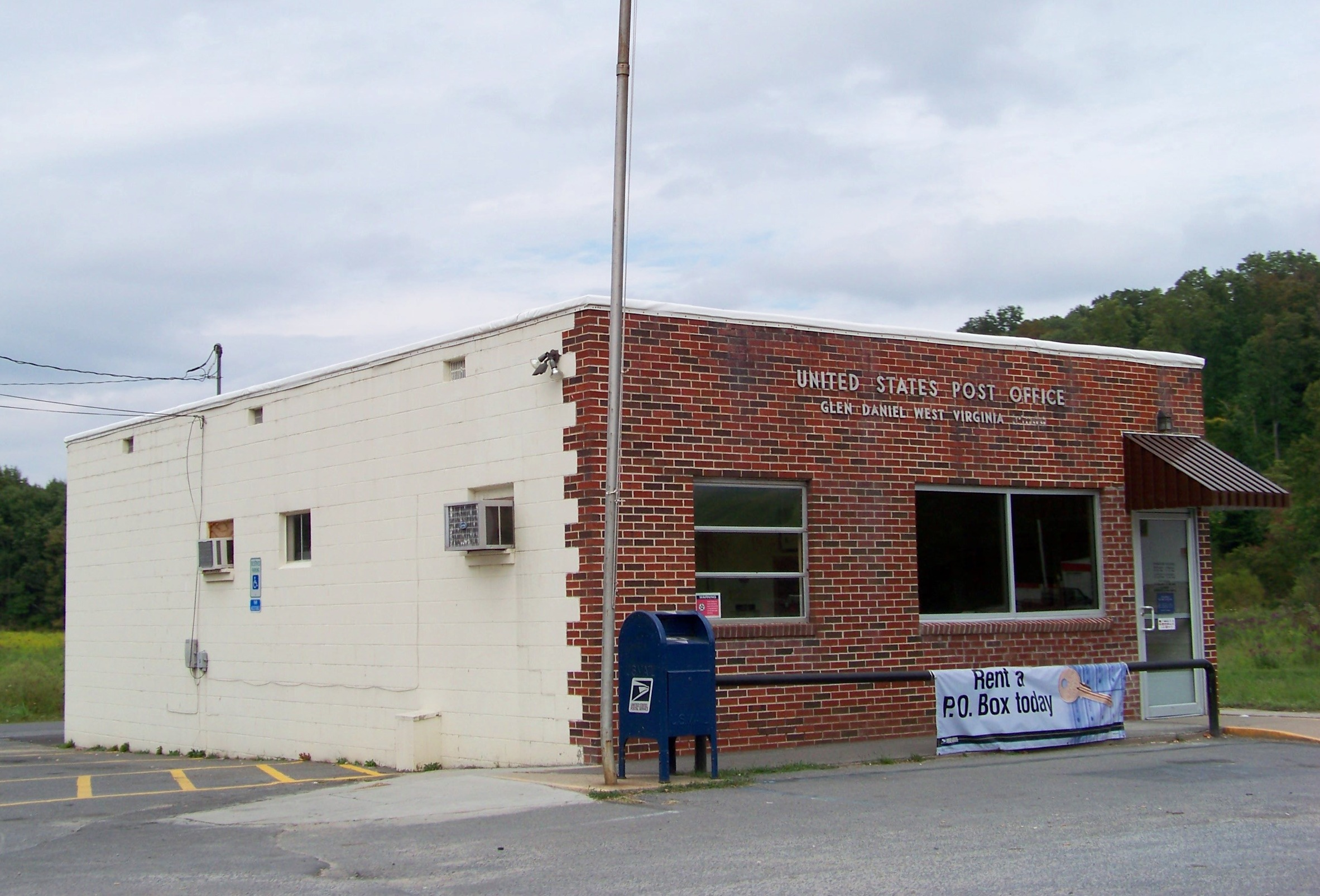

- Location within West Virginia Location within the United States
- Coordinates: 37°46′44″N 81°20′13″W
- Country: United States
- State: West Virginia
- County: Raleigh
- Elevation: 1,903 ft (580 m)
- Time zone: UTC-5 (Eastern (EST))
  - Summer (DST): UTC-4 (EDT)
- ZIP code: 25844
- Area codes: 304 & 681
- GNIS feature ID: 1558364

Glen Daniel is an unincorporated community in Raleigh County, West Virginia, United States. Glen Daniel is located at the junction of West Virginia Route 3 and West Virginia Route 99, 8.5 miles (13.7 km) west of Beckley. Glen Daniel has a post office with ZIP code 25844.

== Notable people ==
- Joe L. Smith, West Virginia politician
