= Hepzibah, Harrison County, West Virginia =

- Census-designated place
- Location within West Virginia Location within the United States
- Coordinates: 39°19′57″N 80°20′07″W
- Country: United States
- State: West Virginia
- County: Harrison

Area
  - Total: 0.922 sq mi (2.39 km^{2})
  - Land: 0.922 sq mi (2.39 km^{2})
  - Water: 0 sq mi (0 km^{2})
- Elevation: 1,027 ft (313 m)

Population (2020)
  - Total: 387
  - Density: 420/sq mi (162/km^{2})
- Time zone: UTC-5 (Eastern (EST))
  - Summer (DST): UTC-4 (EDT)
- ZIP code: 26369
- Area codes: 304 & 681
- GNIS feature ID: 1554686

Hepzibah is a census-designated place (CDP) and coal town in Harrison County, West Virginia, United States. It is located on U.S. Route 19 and West Virginia Route 20, 3.5 miles (5.6 km) north of Clarksburg.

Hepzibah has a post office with ZIP code 26369. As of the 2020 census, its population was 387 (down from 566 at the 2010 census).
