= Letch, West Virginia =

- Unincorporated community
- Location within West Virginia Location within the United States
- Coordinates: 38°48′3″N 80°29′47″W
- Country: United States
- State: West Virginia
- County: Braxton
- Elevation: 1,024 ft (312 m)
- Time zone: UTC-5 (Eastern (EST))
  - Summer (DST): UTC-4 (EDT)
- Postal code: 26376
- GNIS feature ID: 1549782

Letch is an unincorporated community in Braxton County, West Virginia, United States. It had a post office that opened in 1899 and closed in 1913.
