= West Virginia Route 20 =

State highway in West Virginia, United States

West Virginia Route 20

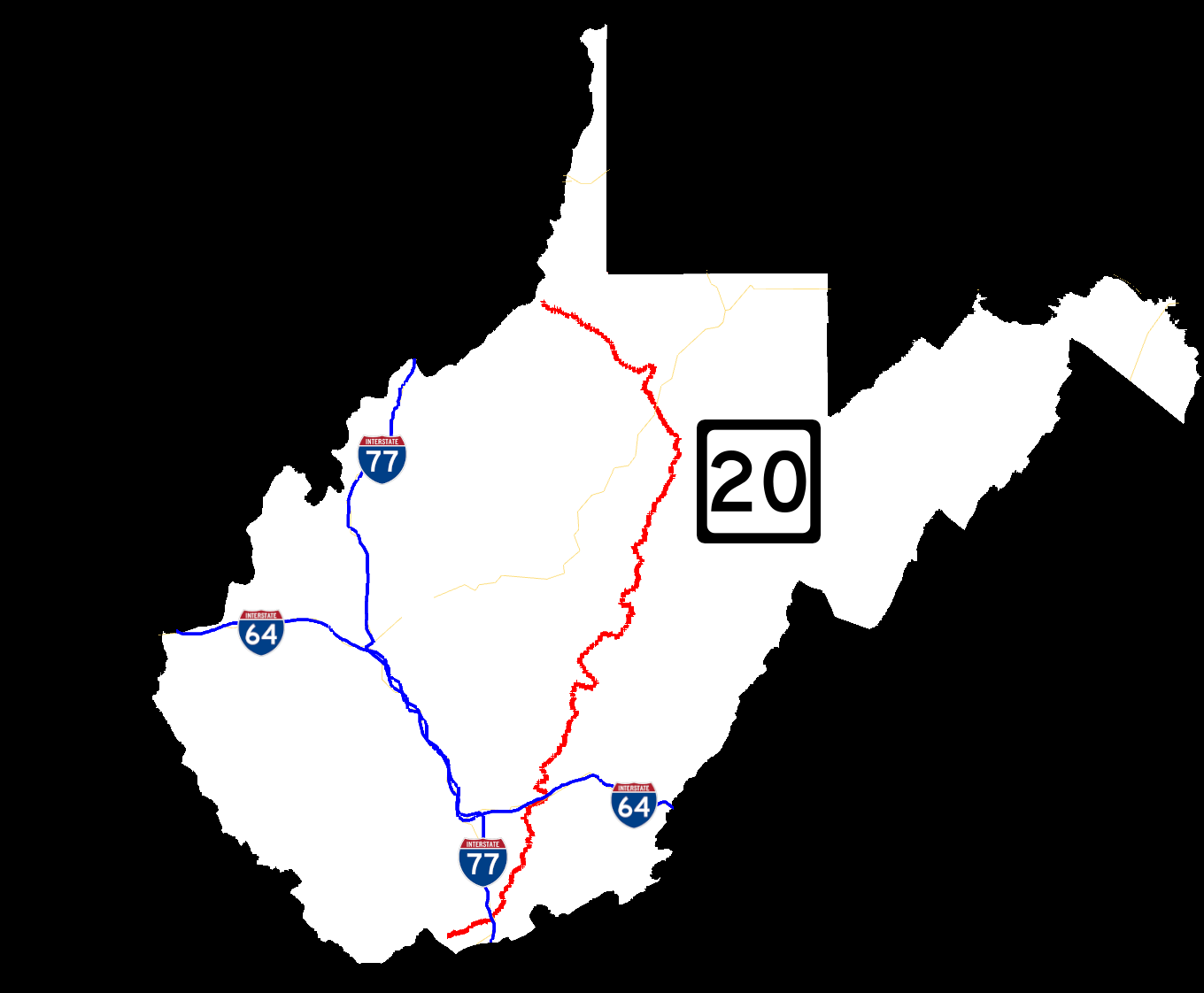

Route information
- Maintained by WVDOH
- Length: 256.15 mi (412.23 km)

Major junctions
- South end: US 52 in Bluewell
- US 19 in Princeton; WV 3 in Hinton; I-64 near Sandstone; US 60 in Rainelle; WV 39 in Nettie; US 33 / US 119 near Buckhannon; I-79 in Quiet Dell; US 50 in Clarksburg
- North end: WV 7 near New Martinsville

Location
- Country: United States
- State: West Virginia
- Counties: Mercer, Summers, Fayette, Greenbrier, Nicholas, Webster, Upshur, Barbour, Harrison, Wetzel

Highway system
- West Virginia State Highway System; Interstate; US; State
← US 19	→ US 22

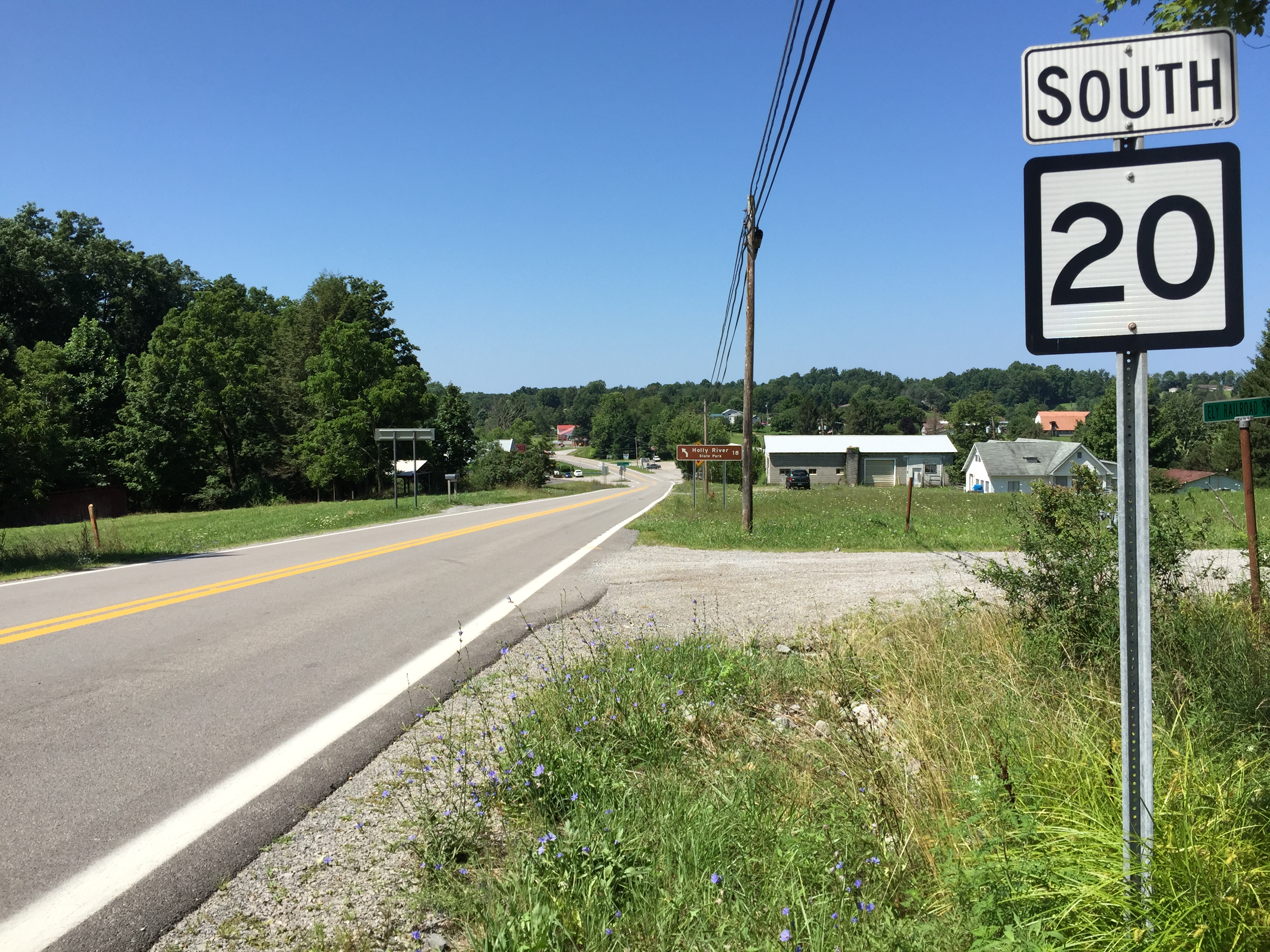
View south along WV 20 in Rock Cave

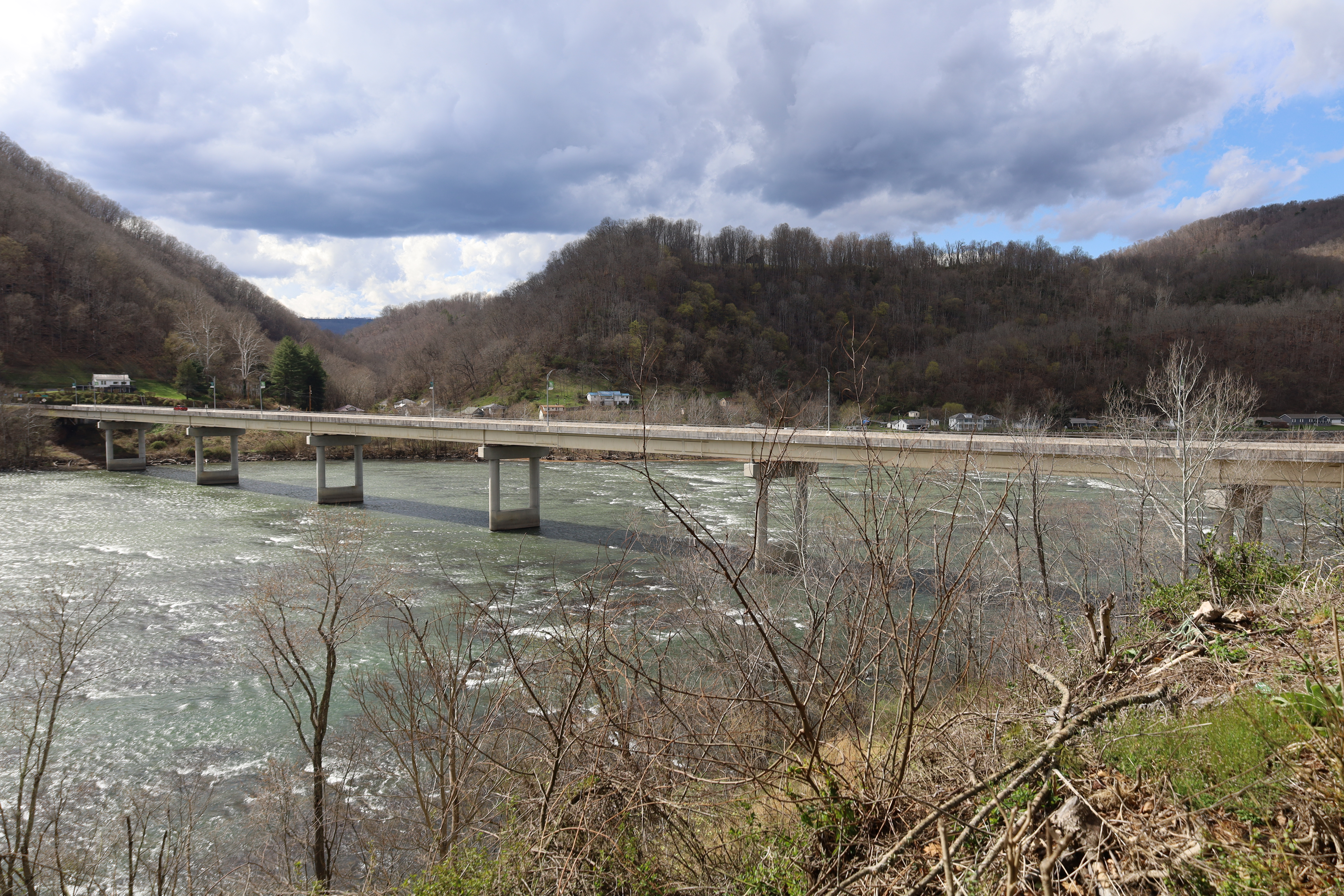
WV 20 crosses the New River at Hinton.

West Virginia Route 20 is a major north–south state highway in the U.S. state of West Virginia. The southern terminus of the route is at U.S. Route 52 in Bluewell, a small unincorporated suburb of Bluefield. The northern terminus is at West Virginia Route 7 three miles (5 km) east of New Martinsville. WV Route 20 is the longest state route in West Virginia.

== Attractions ==
- Concord University, Athens
- Pipestem Resort State Park, Pipestem
- Bluestone State Park, Summers County
- Bluestone Lake, Summers County
- Sandstone Falls, New River Gorge National Park and Preserve, north of Hinton
- Holly River State Park, Webster County

== Major intersections ==
County	Location	mi	km	Destinations	Notes
Mercer	Bluewell	0.00	0.00	US 52 – Bluefield, Welch, Bramwell Historic District	
Mercer	Littlesburg			WV 108 – Bluefield	Construction starts mid to late summer of 2024
Mercer	Princeton			WV 104 east	
Mercer	Princeton			US 19	traffic circle around Mercer County Courthouse
Mercer	Princeton			WV 104 to I-77 / US 460	
Summers				WV 3 east – Alderson	south end of WV 3 overlap
Summers				WV 3 west – Beckley	north end of WV 3 overlap
Summers	Hinton			WV 107 south (2nd Avenue)	
Summers				CR 7 (Meadow Creek Road) to I-64 – Beckley, Lewisburg	
Greenbrier	Rainelle			US 60 west – Charleston	south end of US 60 overlap
Greenbrier	Charmco			US 60 east – Lewisburg	north end of US 60 overlap
Nicholas	Nettie			WV 39 west – Summersville	south end of WV 39 overlap
Nicholas	Fenwick			WV 39 east / WV 55 east – Richwood	north end of WV 39 overlap; south end of WV 55 overlap
Nicholas	Craigsville			WV 55 west – Muddlety, Summersville	north end of WV 55 overlap
Webster				WV 82 west to US 19 / I-79 – Birch River	
Webster	Webster Springs			WV 15 east – Valley Head	south end of WV 15 overlap
Webster				WV 15 west – Flatwoods	north end of WV 15 overlap
Upshur	Rock Cave			WV 4 south – Sutton	
Upshur	Buckhannon			CR 12 / CR 151 (Main Street)	former US 33 / US 119 south
Upshur	Buckhannon			US 33 to US 119 south / I-79 – Weston, Elkins	interchange (future US 48); south end of US 119 overlap
Upshur				US 119 north – Philippi	north end of US 119 overlap
Harrison				WV 57 east – Philippi	
Harrison				I-79 – Charleston, Clarksburg	I-79 exit 115
Harrison	Nutter Fort			WV 58 east – Stonewood, Bridgeport	
Harrison	Nutter Fort			WV 98 west to US 19	
Harrison	Clarksburg			US 50 to I-79 – Parkersburg, Bridgeport	interchange
Harrison	Clarksburg			US 19 south (Milford Street)	south end of US 19 overlap
Harrison	Clarksburg			US 50 – Parkersburg, Bridgeport	interchange
Harrison	Shinnston			US 19 north – Shinnston	north end of US 19 overlap
Wetzel		256.15	412.23	WV 7 – New Martinsville, Morgantown	
1.000 mi = 1.609 km; 1.000 km = 0.621 mi: Concurrency terminus
