= Hico, West Virginia =

- Census-designated place (CDP)
- Location within West Virginia Location within the United States
- Coordinates: 38°07′02″N 81°00′20″W
- Country: United States
- State: West Virginia
- County: Fayette

Area
  - Total: 5.020 sq mi (13.00 km^{2})
  - Land: 5.010 sq mi (12.98 km^{2})
  - Water: 0.010 sq mi (0.026 km^{2})
- Elevation: 2,142 ft (653 m)

Population (2020)
  - Total: 239
  - Density: 47.7/sq mi (18.4/km^{2})
- Time zone: UTC-5 (Eastern (EST))
  - Summer (DST): UTC-4 (EDT)
- ZIP code: 25854
- Area codes: 304 & 681
- GNIS feature ID: 1554698

Hico is a census-designated place (CDP) in Fayette County, West Virginia, United States. Hico is located at the junction of U.S. routes 19 and 60, 7 miles (11 km) northeast of Fayetteville. Hico has a post office with ZIP code 25854. As of the 2020 census, its population was 239 (down from 272 at the 2010 census).

Some believe that the community was named after a variety of tobacco called hico, while others believe the name is a transfer from Hyco, Virginia (an extinct town).

On April 2, 2024, an EF2 tornado caused significant damage just to the south of Hico.

== Climate ==
The climate in this area is characterized by hot, humid summers and generally mild to cool winters. According to the Köppen Climate Classification system, Hico has a humid subtropical climate, abbreviated "Cfa" on climate maps.
