= Cool Ridge, West Virginia =

Unincorporated community in West Virginia, United States

- Unincorporated community
- Location within West Virginia Location within the United States
- Coordinates: 37°39′29″N 81°05′44″W
- Country: United States
- State: West Virginia
- County: Raleigh
- Elevation: 2,936 ft (895 m)
- Time zone: UTC-5 (Eastern (EST))
  - Summer (DST): UTC-4 (EDT)
- ZIP code: 25825
- Area codes: 304 & 681
- GNIS feature ID: 1537605

Cool Ridge is an unincorporated community in Raleigh County, West Virginia, United States. Cool Ridge is located on U.S. Route 19, 3.5 miles (5.6 km) south of Shady Spring. Cool Ridge has a post office with ZIP code 25825.

== Notable resident ==
- Cynthia Rylant (b. 1954), children's author, spent part of her childhood in Cool Ridge and part of her childhood in Beaver.
