= Bradley, West Virginia =

- Census-designated place (CDP) (CDP)
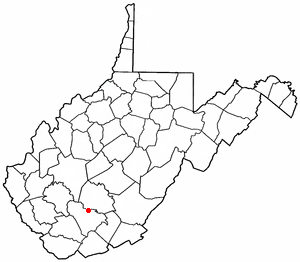
- Location of Bradley, West Virginia
- Coordinates: 37°52′25″N 81°12′10″W
- Country: United States
- State: West Virginia
- County: Raleigh

Area
  - Total: 4.2 sq mi (11.0 km^{2})
  - Land: 4.2 sq mi (11.0 km^{2})
  - Water: 0 sq mi (0.0 km^{2})
- Elevation: 2,192 ft (668 m)

Population (2020)
  - Total: 1,928
  - Density: 454/sq mi (175/km^{2})
- Time zone: UTC-5 (Eastern (EST))
  - Summer (DST): UTC-4 (EDT)
- ZIP code: 25818
- Area code: 304
- FIPS code: 54-09676
- GNIS feature ID: 2389229

Bradley is a census-designated place (CDP) in Raleigh County, West Virginia, United States, named in honor of General Omar Bradley, a field commander in North Africa and Europe during World War II and a General of the Army. The population was 1,928 at the 2020 census.

== Geography ==
According to the United States Census Bureau, the CDP has a total area of 5.6 square miles (14.6 km^{2}), all land.

== Demographics ==
Historical population
Census	Pop.	Note	%±
2000	2,371		—
2010	2,040		−14.0%
2020	1,928		−5.5%
U.S. Decennial Census

As of the census of 2000, there were 2,371 people, 873 households, and 613 families living in the CDP. The population density was 422.0 people per square mile (162.9/km^{2}). There were 934 housing units at an average density of 166.2/sq mi (64.2/km^{2}). The racial makeup of the CDP was 96.46% White, 0.97% African American, 0.42% Native American, 1.10% Asian, 0.04% Pacific Islander, 0.17% from other races, and 0.84% from two or more races. Hispanic or Latino of any race were 0.34% of the population.

There were 873 households, out of which 31.6% had children under the age of 18 living with them, 57.5% were married couples living together, 9.6% had a female householder with no husband present, and 29.7% were non-families. 25.8% of all households were made up of individuals, and 10.9% had someone living alone who was 65 years of age or older. The average household size was 2.42 and the average family size was 2.90.

In the CDP, the population was spread out, with 21.4% under the age of 18, 16.1% from 18 to 24, 29.8% from 25 to 44, 22.2% from 45 to 64, and 10.5% who were 65 years of age or older. The median age was 33 years. For every 100 females, there were 93.7 males. For every 100 females age 18 and over, there were 93.5 males.

The median income for a household in the CDP was $28,844, and the median income for a family was $32,330. Males had a median income of $30,427 versus $16,176 for females. The per capita income for the CDP was $13,910. About 16.9% of families and 18.3% of the population were below the poverty line, including 33.2% of those under age 18 and 5.3% of those age 65 or over.
