= Canfield, Braxton County, West Virginia =

Unincorporated community in West Virginia, United States

Canfield
- Unincorporated community
- Location within the state of West Virginia Canfield (the United States)
- Coordinates: 38°35′39″N 80°45′14″W
- Country: United States
- State: West Virginia
- County: Braxton
- Time zone: UTC-5 (Eastern (EST))
  - Summer (DST): UTC-4 (EDT)

Canfield is an unincorporated community in Braxton County, West Virginia, United States.

Some say the community was named after B. T. Canfield, a local farmer, while others believe Canfield has the name of an early postmaster.
