= Westover, West Virginia =

- City
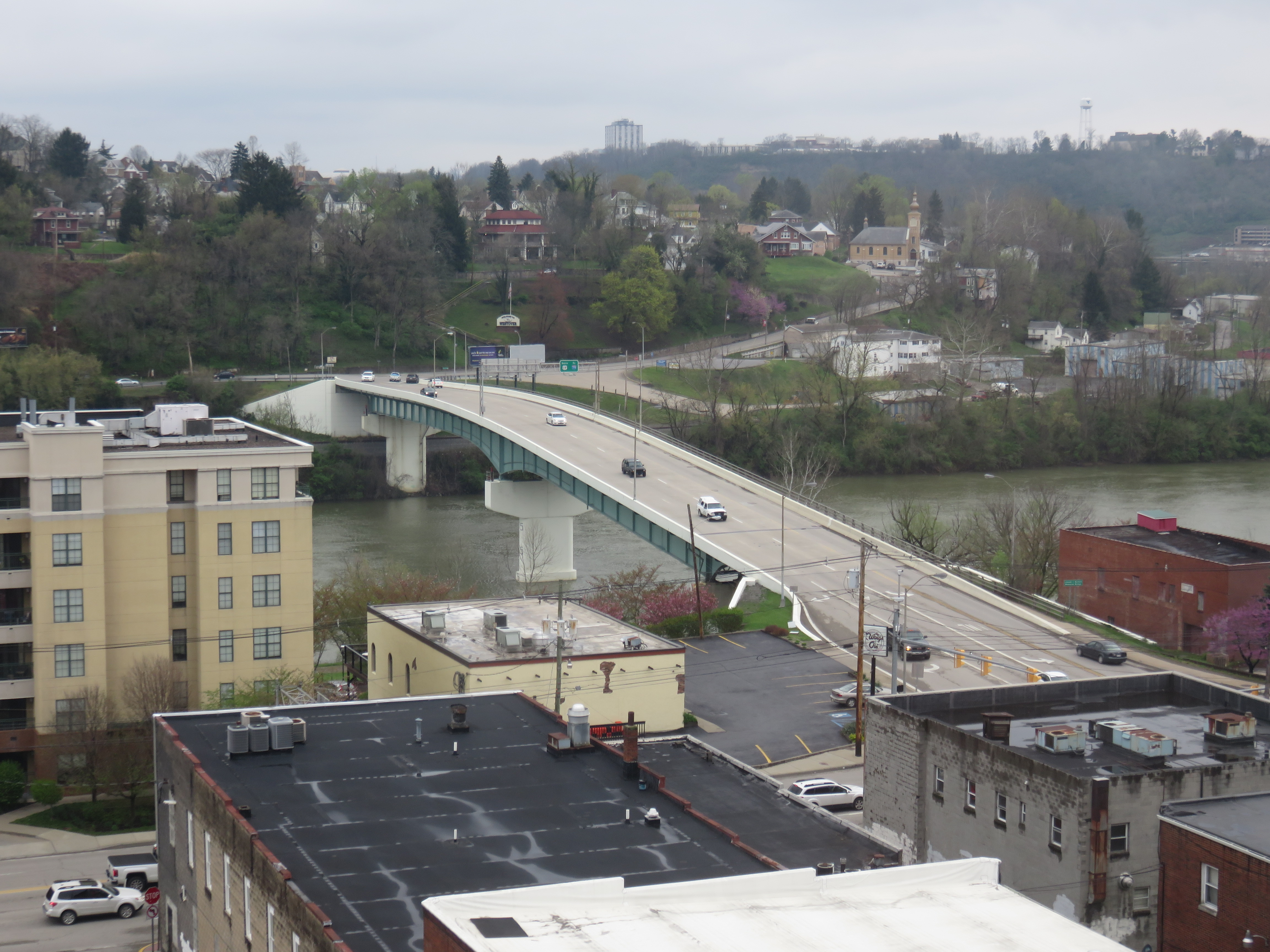
- Westover viewed from across the Monongahela River

- Location of Westover in Monongalia County, West Virginia.
- Coordinates: 39°38′6″N 79°58′28″W
- Country: United States
- State: West Virginia
- County: Monongalia
- Incorporated: October 12, 1911

Area
  - Total: 1.51 sq mi (3.90 km^{2})
  - Land: 1.50 sq mi (3.89 km^{2})
  - Water: 0 sq mi (0.00 km^{2})
- Elevation: 945 ft (288 m)

Population (2020)
  - Total: 3,955
  - Estimate (2021): 4,075
  - Density: 2,777/sq mi (1,072.1/km^{2})
- Time zone: UTC-5 (Eastern (EST))
  - Summer (DST): UTC-4 (EDT)
- ZIP codes: 26501-26502
- Area code: 304
- FIPS code: 54-85996
- GNIS feature ID: 1555960
- Website: https://www.westoverwv.org

Westover is a city in Monongalia County, West Virginia, United States, along the Monongahela River. The population was 3,995 at the 2020 census. It is part of the Morgantown metropolitan area.

== History ==
Westover was named from its location over the Monongahela River from Morgantown. Westover was incorporated on October 12, 1911. Westover expanded from its original area to include Riverside on November 27, 1945, Morgan Heights, Fairmor and Maple Grove on November 22, 1947; and the area in which Westover Park was built on March 10, 1955.

== Geography ==
Westover is located at 39°38′6″N 79°58′28″W (39.635095, -79.974382).

According to the United States Census Bureau, the city has a total area of 1.51 square miles (3.91 km^{2}), all land.

== Demographics ==
Historical population
Census	Pop.	Note	%±
1920	721		—
1930	1,633		126.5%
1940	1,752		7.3%
1950	4,318		146.5%
1960	4,749		10.0%
1970	5,086		7.1%
1980	4,884		−4.0%
1990	4,201		−14.0%
2000	3,941		−6.2%
2010	3,983		1.1%
2020	3,955		−0.7%
2021 (est.)	4,075		3.0%
U.S. Decennial Census

=== 2020 census ===
As of the 2020 census, Westover had a population of 3,955. The median age was 38.4 years. 17.2% of residents were under the age of 18 and 16.7% of residents were 65 years of age or older. For every 100 females there were 95.2 males, and for every 100 females age 18 and over there were 93.9 males age 18 and over.

99.5% of residents lived in urban areas, while 0.5% lived in rural areas.

There were 1,872 households in Westover, of which 21.0% had children under the age of 18 living in them. Of all households, 36.1% were married-couple households, 23.8% were households with a male householder and no spouse or partner present, and 29.5% were households with a female householder and no spouse or partner present. About 37.1% of all households were made up of individuals and 11.2% had someone living alone who was 65 years of age or older.

There were 2,095 housing units, of which 10.6% were vacant. The homeowner vacancy rate was 2.0% and the rental vacancy rate was 10.6%.

Racial composition as of the 2020 census
Race	Number	Percent
White	3,377	85.4%
Black or African American	195	4.9%
American Indian and Alaska Native	10	0.3%
Asian	32	0.8%
Native Hawaiian and Other Pacific Islander	1	0.0%
Some other race	54	1.4%
Two or more races	286	7.2%
Hispanic or Latino (of any race)	128	3.2%

=== 2010 census ===
As of the census of 2010, there were 3,983 people, 1,845 households, and 990 families living in the city. The population density was 2,637.7 inhabitants per square mile (1,018.4/km^{2}). There were 2,016 housing units at an average density of 1,335.1 per square mile (515.5/km^{2}). The racial makeup of the city was 91.2% White, 4.9% African American, 0.3% Native American, 1.1% Asian, 0.3% from other races, and 2.2% from two or more races. Hispanic or Latino of any race were 1.7% of the population.

There were 1,845 households, of which 22.6% had children under the age of 18 living with them, 36.0% were married couples living together, 12.6% had a female householder with no husband present, 5.0% had a male householder with no wife present, and 46.3% were non-families. 35.5% of all households were made up of individuals, and 11% had someone living alone who was 65 years of age or older. The average household size was 2.16 and the average family size was 2.79.

The median age in the city was 38 years. 17.8% of residents were under the age of 18; 11.6% were between the ages of 18 and 24; 28.5% were from 25 to 44; 26.8% were from 45 to 64; and 15.1% were 65 years of age or older. The gender makeup of the city was 50.1% male and 49.9% female.

=== 2000 census ===
As of the census of 2000, there were 3,941 people, 1,807 households, and 1,004 families living in the city. The population density was 2,995.5 people per square mile (1,152.7/km^{2}). There were 1,983 housing units at an average density of 1,507.2 per square mile (580.0/km^{2}). The racial makeup of the city was 93.58% White, 3.48% African American, 0.20% Native American, 0.74% Asian, 0.03% Pacific Islander, 0.25% from other races, and 1.73% from two or more races. Hispanic or Latino of any race were 0.46% of the population.

There were 1,807 households, out of which 23.6% had children under the age of 18 living with them, 40.6% were married couples living together, 11.9% had a female householder with no husband present, and 44.4% were non-families. 35.3% of all households were made up of individuals, and 12.2% had someone living alone who was 65 years of age or older. The average household size was 2.18 and the average family size was 2.86.

In the city, the population was spread out, with 19.9% under the age of 18, 11.1% from 18 to 24, 29.5% from 25 to 44, 22.1% from 45 to 64, and 17.4% who were 65 years of age or older. The median age was 38 years. For every 100 females, there were 88.3 males. For every 100 females age 18 and over, there were 84.0 males.

The median income for a household in the city was $28,659, and the median income for a family was $43,469. Males had a median income of $29,355 versus $21,672 for females. The per capita income for the city was $18,199. About 10.0% of families and 17.8% of the population were below the poverty line, including 26.3% of those under age 18 and 5.2% of those age 65 or over.

== Education ==
Monongalia County Schools operates area schools.

The zoned schools are Skyview Elementary School, Westwood Middle School, and University High School.
