= Beaver, West Virginia =

Unincorporated community in West Virginia, United States

- Census-designated place (CDP)
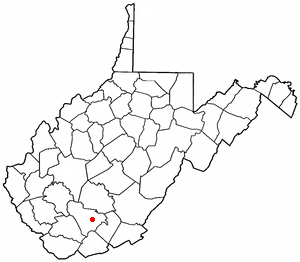
- Location of Beaver, West Virginia
- Coordinates: 37°44′51″N 81°8′31″W
- Country: United States
- State: West Virginia
- County: Raleigh

Area
  - Total: 4.4 sq mi (11.4 km^{2})
  - Land: 4.4 sq mi (11.4 km^{2})
  - Water: 0 sq mi (0.0 km^{2})
- Elevation: 2,717 ft (828 m)

Population (2020)
  - Total: 1,129
  - Density: 256/sq mi (99.0/km^{2})
- Time zone: UTC-5 (Eastern (EST))
  - Summer (DST): UTC-4 (EDT)
- ZIP code: 25813
- Area code: 304
- FIPS code: 54-05260
- GNIS feature ID: 2389185

Beaver is a census-designated place (CDP) in Raleigh County, West Virginia, United States. The population was 1,129 at the 2020 census.

== Etymology ==
Beaver first acquired its name c. 1860 “from the great numbers of beavers abounding in the creeks during the early days of settlement”, according to A History of Shady Spring District (1979), compiled by the Shady Spring District Woman's Club. When the community became eligible for a post office in the early 1900s, the residents discovered another West Virginia town already had the name. The town adopted the name "Oxley", after a Huntington man who ran a clothing store there. In 1929 or 1930, Grover Hedrick bought Ritter Lumber Company and had the community name changed to "Glen Hedrick." The residents petitioned the federal government for another name change and finally, the community was officially named Beaver in 1939.

== Geography ==
According to the United States Census Bureau, the C.D.P. has a total area of 4.4 square miles (11.4 km^{2}), of which 4.4 square miles (11.4 km^{2}) is land and 0.23% is water.

== Demographics ==
Historical population
Census	Pop.	Note	%±
2000	1,378		—
2010	1,308		−5.1%
2020	1,129		−13.7%
U.S. Decennial Census

As of the census of 2000, there were 1,378 people, 602 households, and 388 families residing in the C.D.P. The population density was 313.7 people per square mile (121.2/km^{2}). There were 696 housing units at an average density of 158.4/sq mi (61.2/km^{2}). The racial composition of the C.D.P. was 98.77% white, 0.07% black, 0.15% aboriginal American, 0.94% Asian, and 0.07% from two or more races. Hispanic or Latino of any race were 0.51% of the population.

There were 602 households, out of which 25.6% had children under the age of 18 living with them, 51.3% were married couples living together, 10.6% had a female householder with no husband present, and 35.4% were non-families. 30.1% of all households were made up of individuals, and 13.5% had someone living alone who was 65 years of age or older. The average household size was 2.26 and the average family size was 2.81.

In the C.D.P., the population was spread out, with 21.8% under the age of 18, 9.8% from 18 to 24, 27.2% from 25 to 44, 25.7% from 45 to 64, and 15.5% who were 65 years of age or older. The median age was 39 years. For every 100 females, there were 91.4 males. For every 100 females age 18 and over, there were 88.9 males.

The median income for a household in the C.D.P. was $25,863, and the median income for a family was $32,083. Males had a median income of $35,156 versus $16,836 for females. The per capita income for the C.D.P. was $16,694. About 9.2% of families and 16.6% of the population were below the poverty line, including 20.6% of those under age 18 and 10.0% of those age 65 or over.

== Notable resident ==
- Cynthia Rylant (b. 1954), children's author, spent part of her childhood in Cool Ridge and part of her childhood in Beaver.
