= List of U.S. Highways in West Virginia =

- Sample highway shields

Highway names
- US Highways: U.S. Route XX (US XX)

System links
- West Virginia State Highway System; Interstate; US; State

The U.S. Highways in the U.S. state of West Virginia are owned and maintained by the West Virginia Division of Highways.

== U.S. Highways ==
Number	Length (mi)	Length (km)	Southern or western terminus	Northern or eastern terminus	Formed	Removed	Notes
US 11	26.16	42.10	US 11 near Rest, Va.	US 11 at Williamsport, Md.	1925	current	
US 19	249.0	400.7	US 19 in Bluefield	US 19 near Mount Morris, Pa.	1926	current	
US 21	187	301	US 21 at Virginia state line in Bluefield	US 21 at Ohio state line Williamstown	1926	1974	Replaced by I-77
US 22	5.97	9.61	US 22 at Weirton	US 22 at Weirton	1926	current	
US 30	3.49	5.62	US 30 at Chester	US 30 near Chester	1926	current	
US 33	248	399	US 33 at Ravenswood	US 33 near Harrisonburg, Va.	1937	current	
US 35	22.6	36.4	I-64 at Teays Valley	US 35 near Beech Hill	1934	current	
US 40	16	26	US 40 at Wheeling	US 40 near West Alexander, Pa.	1926	current	
US 48	143	230	West Virginia Route 93 near Davis	US 48 near Lebanon Church, Va.	2002	current	Under construction as part of Corridor H
US 50	196.20	315.75	US 50 / SR 32 near Belpre, Ohio	US 50 near Winchester, Va.	1926	current	Two sections divided by 9 miles (14 km) in Maryland
US 52	184.9	297.6	I-77 / US 52 near Rocky Gap, Va.	US 52 near Chesapeake, Ohio	1926	current	
US 60	177.8	286.1	US 60 at Kenova	I-64 / US 60 near White Sulphur Springs	1926	current	
US 119	279.7	450.1	US 119 near Williamson	US 119 near Morgantown	1926	current	
US 121	59.1	95.1	US 121 near Pound, Va.	I-64/I-77 in Beckley	proposed	—	
US 219	196	315	US 219 near Rich Creek, Va.	US 219 near Red House, Md.	1934	current	
US 220	93	150	US 220 near Blue Grass, Va.	US 220 in Keyser	1929	current	
US 250	185	298	US 250 in Wheeling	US 250 near West Augusta, Va.	1928	current	
US 340	16.03	25.80	US 340 near Berryville, Va.	US 340 in Harpers Ferry	1926	current	
US 460	26.8	43.1	US 460 near Bluefield	US 460 in Glen Lyn, Va.	1933	current	
US 522	19	31	US 522 near Winchester, Va.	US 522 near Hancock, Md.	1944	current	
