= West Virginia State Highway System =

US state highway system

- Standard signage in West Virginia

Highway names
- Interstates: Interstate XX (I-XX)
- US Highways: U.S. Route XX (US XX)
- State: West Virginia Route XX (WV XX)
- County: County Route XX or XX/YY (CR XX or CR XX/YY)

System links
- West Virginia State Highway System; Interstate; US; State

The West Virginia State Highway System is an integrated system of numbered roads in the U.S. state of West Virginia. These highways were coordinated by the West Virginia Department of Transportation, Division of Highways.

== Types ==
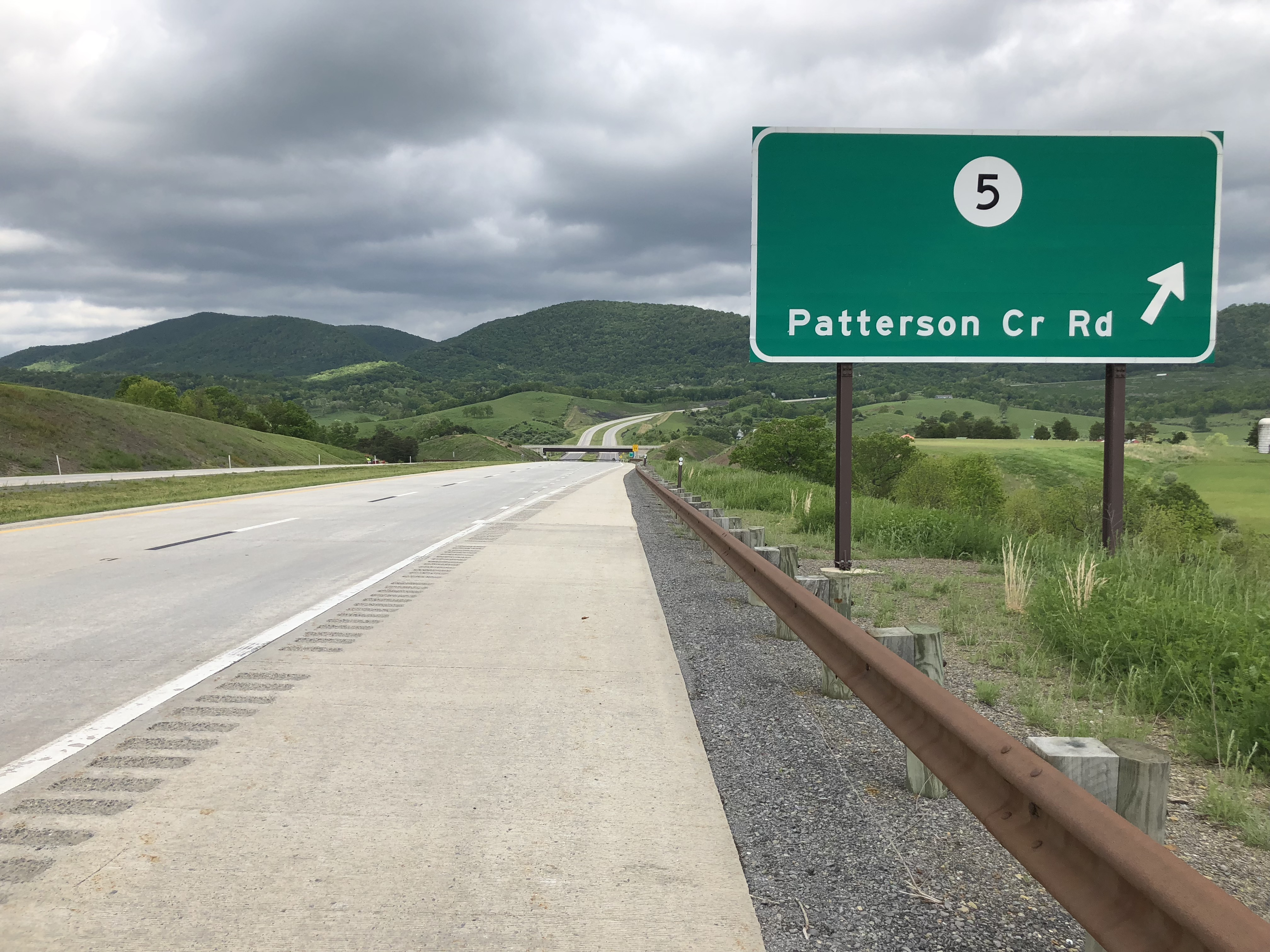
A freeway exit sign with a trunk county route shield

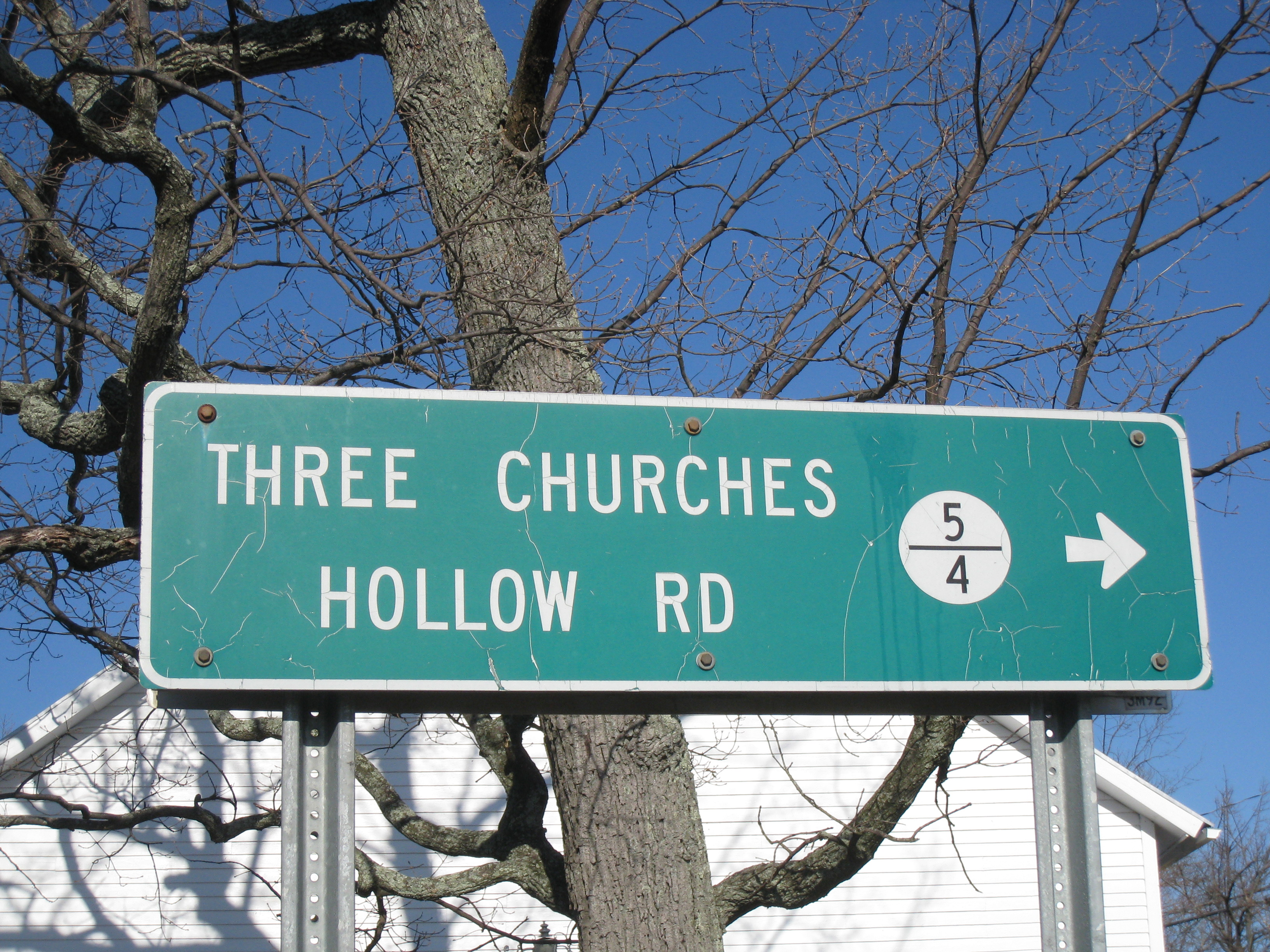
A road sign with a "fractional" spur county route shield

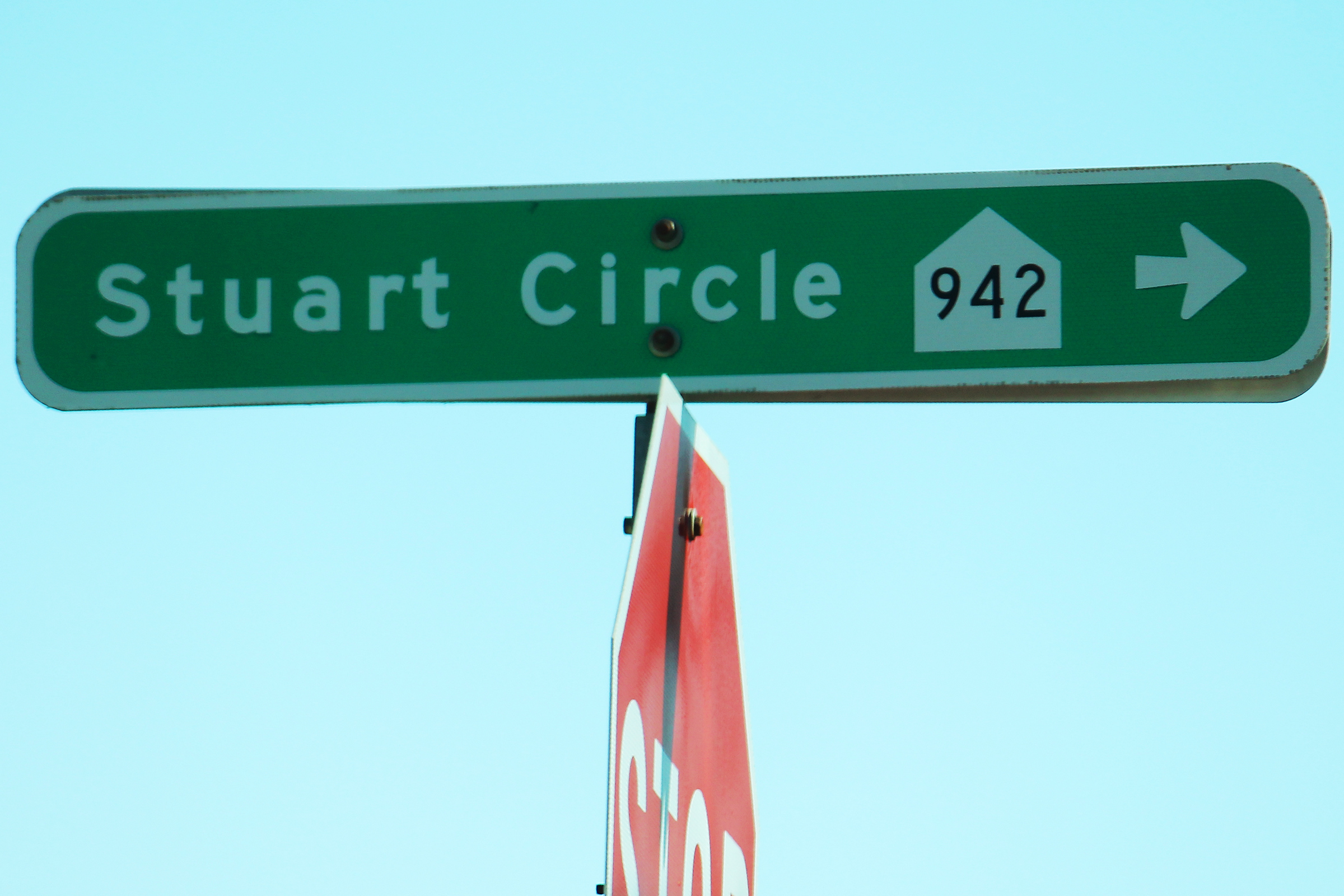
A road sign with a Home Access Road Program shield

West Virginia state highways have a square-shaped highway shield.

West Virginia has a system of secondary state highways, referred to as county routes, that are functionally similar to county roads in most other states. County route designations are only unique within each county. There are two types of county routes:

- Trunk county routes have a single number in a circular highway shield.
- Spur county routes are given "fractional" designations with two numbers displayed vertically: the top number specifies the US, WV, or county route they diverge from, and the bottom is a serial number reflecting the order in which the number was assigned. In many cases, if the parent route is renumbered, the spur roads are not renumbered to reflect the change.

In addition, Home Access Road Program roads have a house-shaped pentagonal shield. They are assigned to dead-end shared driveways. The program began in 1998.

Delta roads had a triangular highway shield. They were assigned to private roads maintained by the state. The system came about in the 1960s, and was phased out in the 1990s, and very few delta markers remain.

== Historical timeline ==
=== 1910s ===
- 1913 West Virginia Legislature creates State Road Bureau
- 1917 West Virginia Legislature creates State Road Commission

=== 1920s ===
- 1920 Good Roads Amendment passed
- 1921 Congress directs each state to recommend roads for Federal Aid
- 1922 State Road designations completed
- 1925 US Numbered Highway System created

=== 1930s ===
- 1933 All public roads outside of municipalities brought under state control

== See also ==
- List of state routes in West Virginia
