= List of Interstate Highways in West Virginia =

Interstate Highways of West Virginia
- Sample highway shields
- Interstate Highways highlighted in red

Highway names
- Interstates: Interstate XX (I-XX)

System links
- West Virginia State Highway System; Interstate; US; State

The Interstate Highways in the U.S. state of West Virginia are owned and maintained by the West Virginia Division of Highways. There are 6 primary interstates, 1 auxiliary interstate, and 2 proposed interstates.

== List ==
Number	Length (mi)	Length (km)	Southern or western terminus	Northern or eastern terminus	Formed	Removed	Notes
I-64	188.75	303.76	I-64 at the Kentucky state line near Ashland, Ky.	I-64 at the Virginia state line near White Sulphur Springs	1956	current	
I-68	31.5	50.7	I-79 in Morgantown	I-68 at the Maryland state line near Friendsville, Md.	1991	current	
I-70	14.45	23.26	I-70 at the Ohio state line in Wheeling	I-70 at the Pennsylvania state line near Wheeling	1963	current	
Future I-73	—	—	I-73 at the Virginia state line	I-73 at the Ohio state line	proposed	—	
Future I-74	—	—	I-74 at the Ohio state line	I-74 at the Virginia state line	proposed	—	
I-77	187.21	301.29	I-77 at the Virginia state line near Bluefield	I-77 at the Ohio state line in Marietta, Oh.	1956	current	
I-79	160.52	258.33	I-77 near Charleston	I-79 at the Pennsylvania state line near Mount Morris, Pa.	1967	current	
I-81	26	42	I-81 at the Virginia state line near Rest, Va.	I-81 at the Maryland state line in Williamsport, Md.	1963	current	
I-470	3.94	6.34	I-470 at the Ohio state line near Wheeling	I-70 in Wheeling	1976	current	
