= East View, West Virginia =

- Census-designated place
- Location within West Virginia Location within the United States
- Coordinates: 39°16′5″N 80°18′40″W
- Country: United States
- State: West Virginia
- County: Harrison

Area
  - Total: 1.02 sq mi (2.63 km^{2})
  - Land: 1.02 sq mi (2.63 km^{2})
  - Water: 0 sq mi (0.0 km^{2})
- Elevation: 970 ft (300 m)

Population (2020)
  - Total: 817
- Time zone: UTC-5 (Eastern (EST))
  - Summer (DST): UTC-4 (EDT)
- ZIP Code: 26301 (Clarksburg)
- Area codes: 304/681
- FIPS code: 54-23524
- GNIS feature ID: 2807483

East View is an unincorporated community and census-designated place (CDP) in Harrison County, West Virginia, United States. As of the 2020 census, it had a population of 817.

East View is in the east-central part of the county, bordered to the west and north by the city of Clarksburg and to the southeast by the town of Anmoore. Ann Moore Run runs through the southern part of the CDP, flowing northwest to Elk Creek on the eastern edge of Clarksburg, which then continues to the West Fork River in downtown.
