= Glen Falls, West Virginia =

Unincorporated community in West Virginia, United States

- Unincorporated community
- Location within West Virginia Location within the United States
- Coordinates: 39°25′17″N 80°20′41″W
- Country: United States
- State: West Virginia
- County: Harrison
- Elevation: 965 ft (294 m)
- Time zone: UTC-5 (Eastern (EST))
  - Summer (DST): UTC-4 (EDT)
- Area codes: 304 & 681
- GNIS feature ID: 1539455

Glen Falls is an unincorporated community in Harrison County, West Virginia, United States. Glen Falls is located on the West Fork River 2 miles (3.2 km) north of Clarksburg.

A significant part of Glen Falls was once a coal camp which was built around 1880. Glen Falls is largely residential and is essentially a bedroom community for Clarksburg. The area is provided with water service by the Clarksburg Water Board. Glen Falls is the home of the Glen Falls Baptist Church, which was founded in 1901. Glen Falls has had two schools, both of which have been closed and demolished. There was once a train station by the West Fork River in the early 1900s. It housed different stores and even a doctor's office. The superintendent's house from the coal camp is still standing, as are some of the tenants' houses.
