= Center Branch Wildlife Management Area =

State Wildlife Management Area in Harrison County, West Virginia

- IUCN category V (protected landscape/seascape)
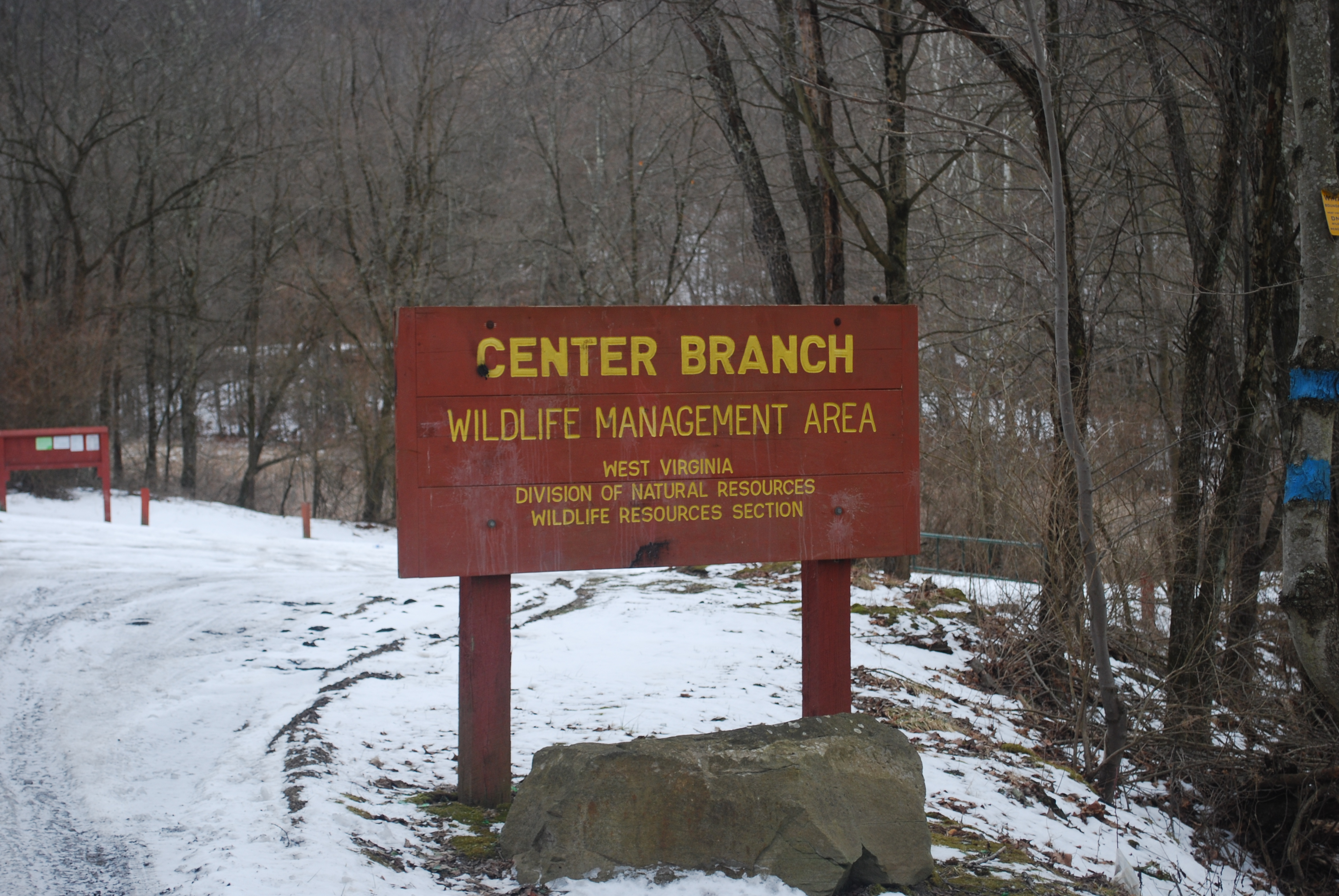
- Entrance sign along Turkey Run Road

- Location within West Virginia
- Location: Harrison, West Virginia, United States
- Coordinates: 39°13′52″N 80°19′38″W
- Area: 975 acres (395 ha)
- Elevation: 1,175 ft (358 m)
- Operator: Wildlife Resources Section, WVDNR

Center Branch Wildlife Management Area is located on 975 acres (395 ha) in Harrison County near Stonewood, West Virginia. The WMA is located on a former strip mine site, and contains several flat benches and high walls. Second growth oak-hickory and mixed hardwoods forests cover much of the land.

Center Branch is located along Turkey Run, a tributary of Elk Creek and the West Fork River. The main entrance is via Turkey Run Road (County Route 20/11) off West Virginia Route 20 near Stonewood.

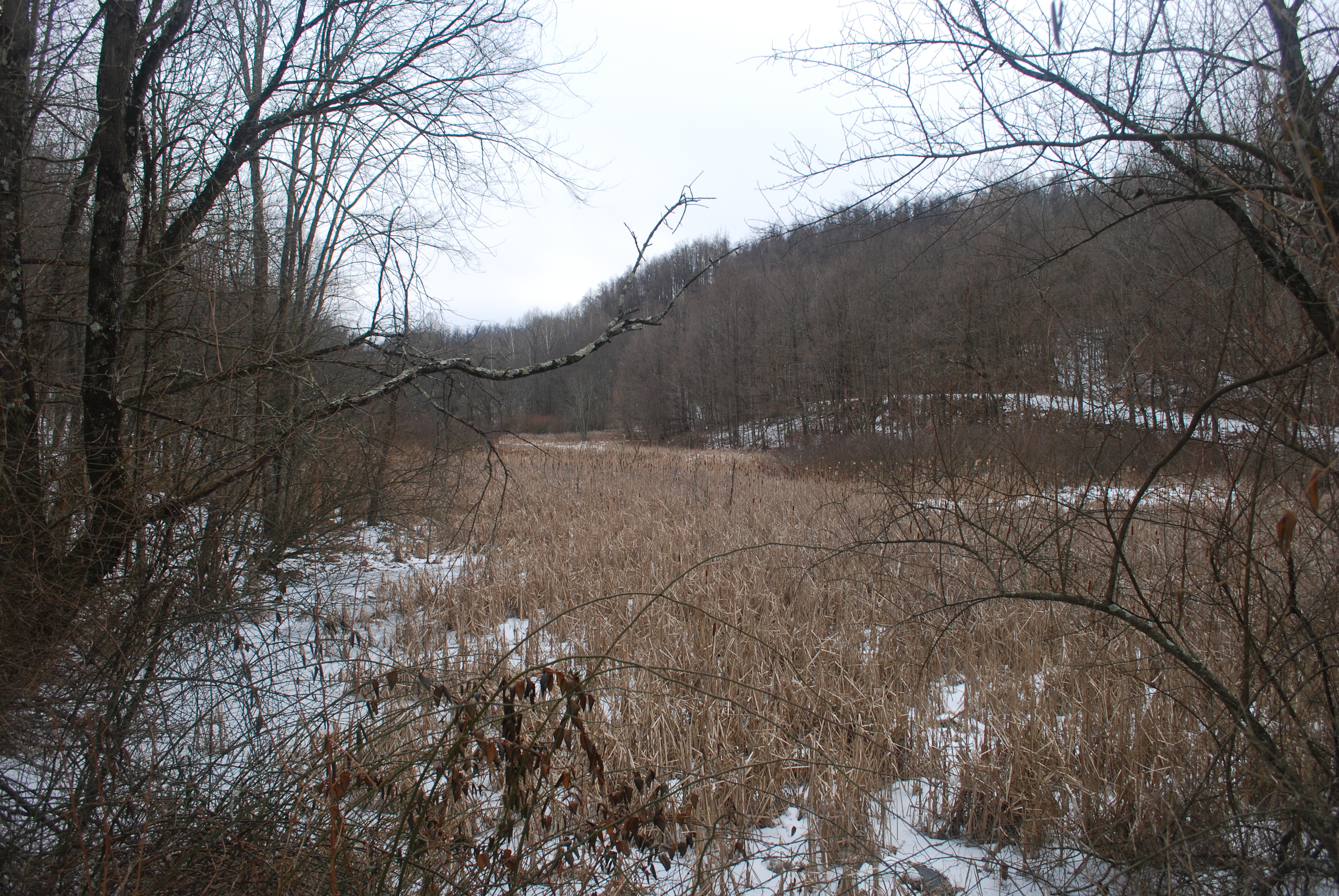
Center Branch wetlands on a 15 °F (−9 °C) January day

== Hunting ==
Hunting opportunities include deer, grouse, squirrel, turkey and grouse. Camping is prohibited at this WMA.

== See also ==
- Animal conservation
- Hunting
- List of West Virginia wildlife management areas
