= Jarvisville, West Virginia =

Unincorporated community in West Virginia, US

Coordinates: 39°14′00″N 80°29′14″W

Jarvisville is an unincorporated community in Harrison County, in the U.S. state of West Virginia.

== History ==
A post office called Jarvisville was established in 1881, and remained in operation until 1909. The community was named after Charles Jarvis, who was credited with securing a post office for the town.
