= Katy Lick, West Virginia =

- Unincorporated community
- Location within West Virginia Location within the United States
- Coordinates: 39°19′3″N 80°25′24″W
- Country: United States
- State: West Virginia
- County: Harrison
- Elevation: 1,050 ft (320 m)
- Time zone: UTC-5 (Eastern (EST))
  - Summer (DST): UTC-4 (EDT)
- GNIS ID: 1554849

Katy Lick is an unincorporated community in Harrison County, West Virginia, United States.
