= Wallace, Harrison County, West Virginia =

- Census-designated place
- Location within West Virginia Location within the United States
- Coordinates: 39°24′34″N 80°29′23″W
- Country: United States
- State: West Virginia
- County: Harrison

Area
  - Total: 1.42 sq mi (3.67 km^{2})
- Elevation: 1,027 ft (313 m)

Population (2020)
  - Total: 201
  - Density: 142/sq mi (54.8/km^{2})
- Time zone: UTC-5 (Eastern (EST))
  - Summer (DST): UTC-4 (EDT)
- ZIP code: 26448
- Area codes: 304 & 681
- GNIS feature ID: 1548735
- FIPS code: 54-84172

Wallace is an unincorporated community and census-designated place in Harrison County, West Virginia, United States. The population was 201 at the 2020 census.

Wallace is located on West Virginia Route 20, approximately 8 miles (13 km) northwest of Lumberport. It is situated on Little Ten Mile Creek, a tributary of Tenmile Creek, and has a post office with ZIP code 26448.
