= Oral Lake, West Virginia =

- Unincorporated community
- Location within West Virginia Location within the United States
- Coordinates: 39°16′31″N 80°12′56″W
- Country: United States
- State: West Virginia
- County: Harrison
- Elevation: 1,010 ft (310 m)
- Time zone: UTC-5 (Eastern (EST))
  - Summer (DST): UTC-4 (EDT)
- GNIS ID: 1555268

Oral Lake is an unincorporated community in Harrison County, West Virginia, United States.
