= West Virginia Route 273 =

State highway in West Virginia, United States

West Virginia Route 273
- Fairmont Gateway Connector

Route information
- Maintained by WVDOH
- Length: 1.3 mi (2.1 km)

Major junctions
- South end: I-79 in Pleasant Valley
- North end: WV 310 in Fairmont

Location
- Country: United States
- State: West Virginia
- Counties: Marion

Highway system
- West Virginia State Highway System; Interstate; US; State
← WV 270	→ WV 279

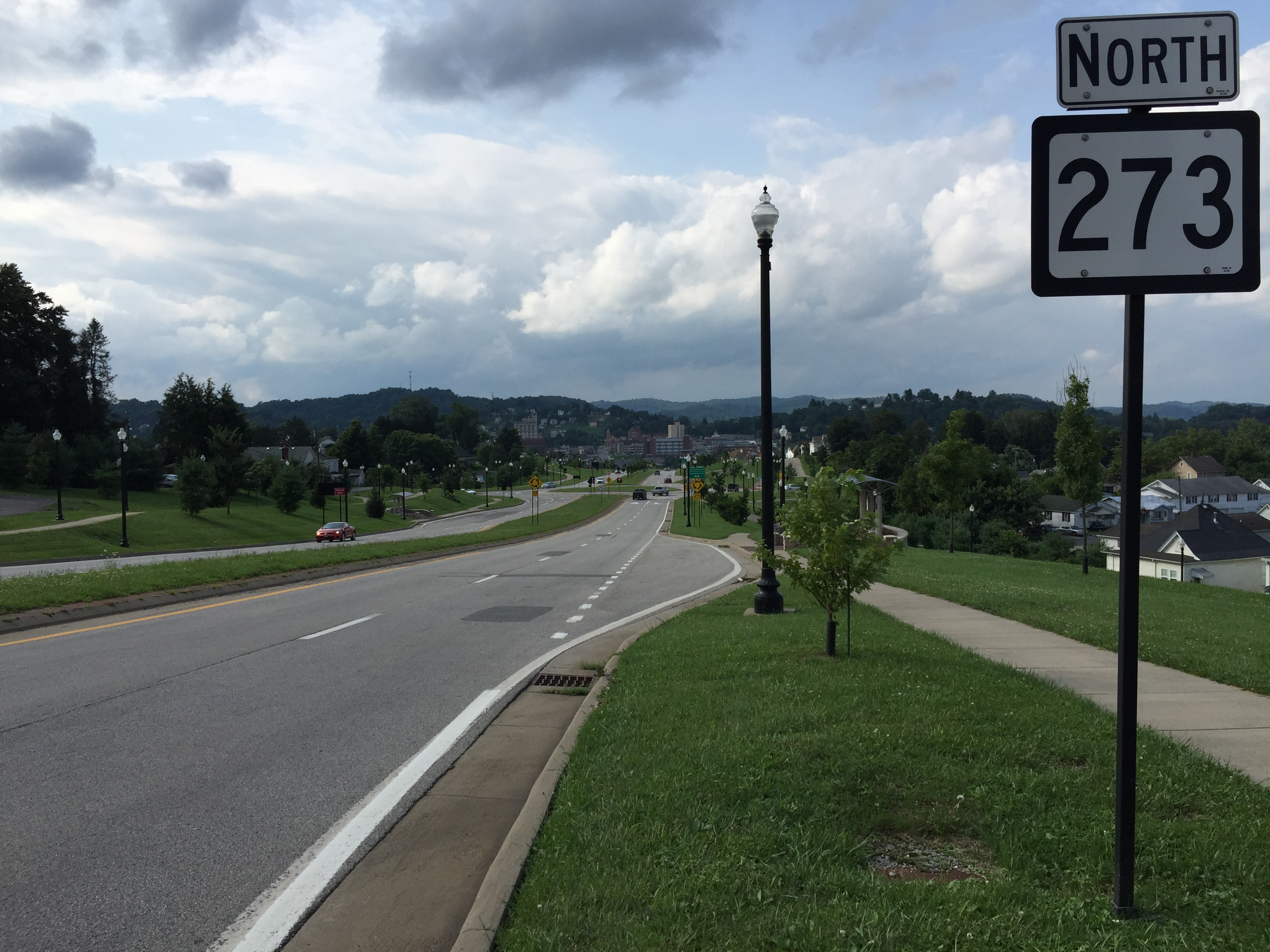
View north along WV 273 in Fairmont

West Virginia Route 273 is a north–south state highway entirely within Marion County, West Virginia. Known as the Fairmont Gateway Connector, the road provides direct access from Interstate 79 to downtown Fairmont. The road was built as a four-lane divided highway along the former State Street corridor and fully opened to traffic on December 22, 2010.

The southern terminus of the route is at exit #136 on Interstate 79. Its northern end is at West Virginia Route 310 at the foot of the Robert H. Mollohan-Jefferson Street Bridge, where traffic can continue into downtown Fairmont. The project features controlled-access right-of-way, a steel arch bridge over Interstate 79, and West Virginia's first two roundabouts. It was built at a cost of $150 million.

== Major intersections ==
The entire route is in Marion County.

Location	mi	km	Destinations	Notes
Pleasant Valley			I-79 / CR 31/20 (Stoney Road) – Clarksburg, Morgantown	I-79 exit 136
Fairmont			CR 64 (Pleasant Valley Road) / Blaine Street	
Fairmont			Haymond Street	roundabout
Fairmont			Elkins Street	roundabout
Fairmont			WV 310 (Merchant Street) / Robert H. Mollohan-Jefferson Street Bridge – Fairmont State University	
1.000 mi = 1.609 km; 1.000 km = 0.621 mi
