= Simpson Creek (West Virginia) =

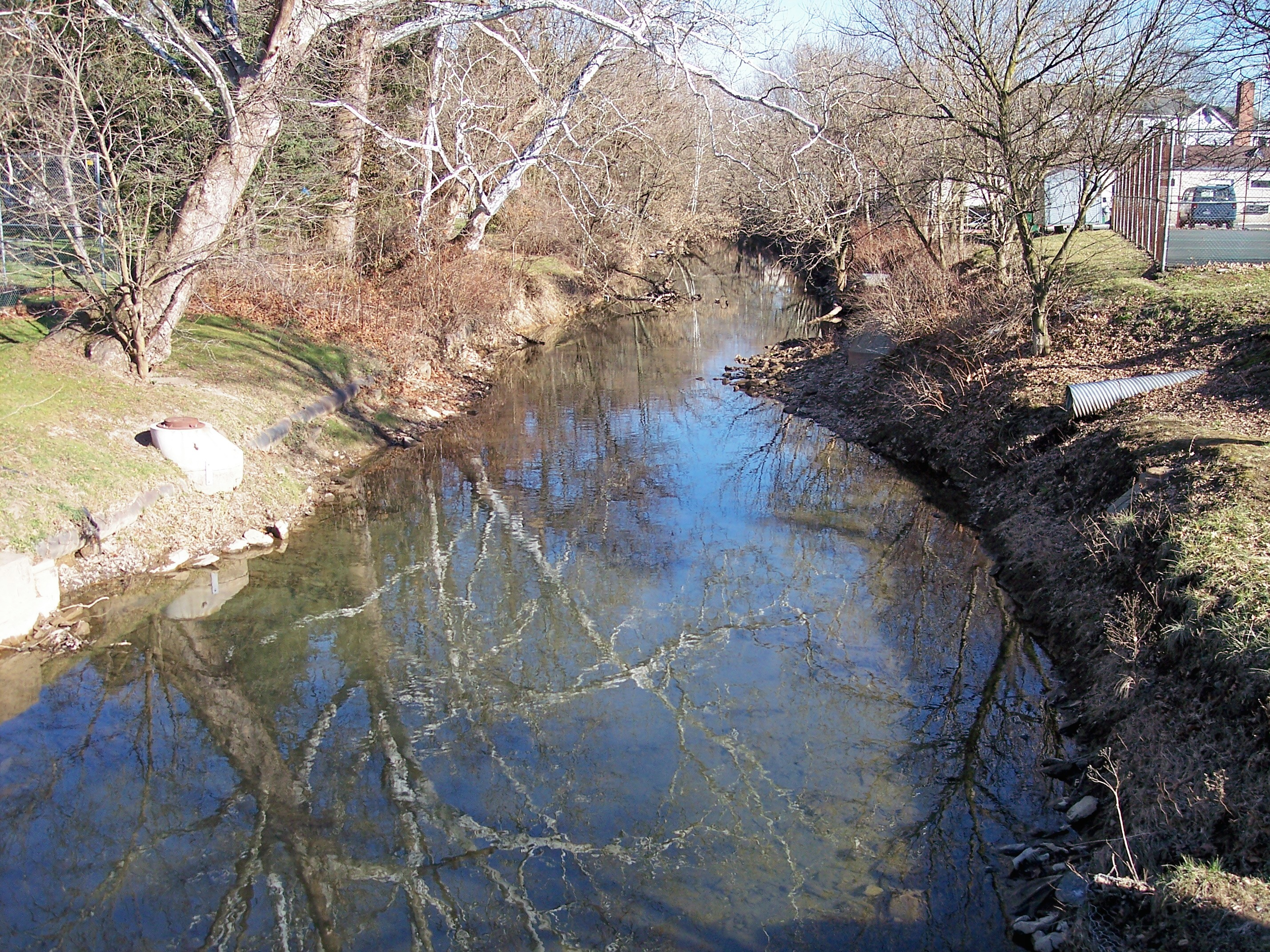
- Simpson Creek in Bridgeport in 2006

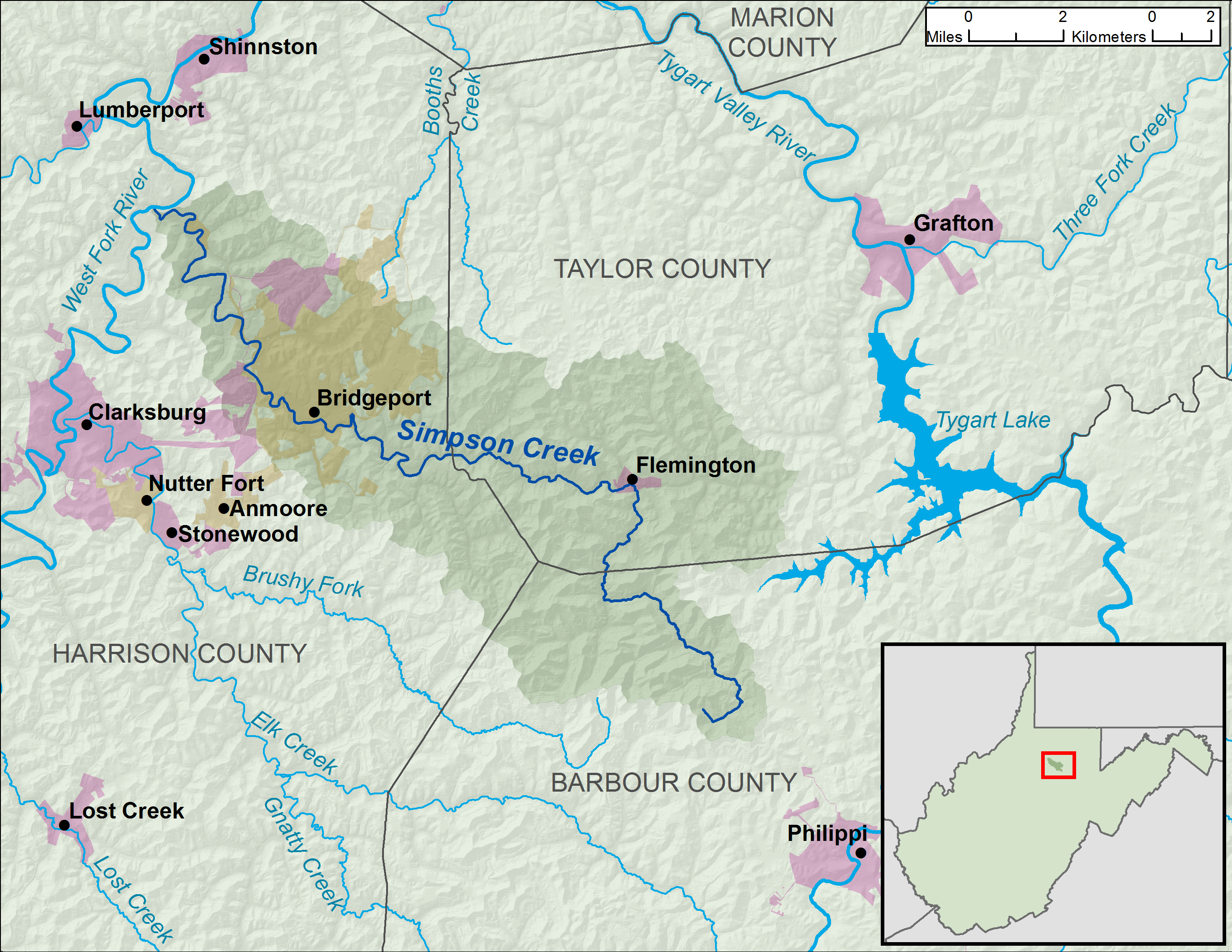
- Simpson Creek and its watershed

Location
- Country: United States
- State: West Virginia
- Counties: Barbour, Taylor, Harrison
- Municipalities: Flemington, Bridgeport

Physical characteristics
- Source
  - location: northwestern Barbour County
  - coordinates: 39°11′51″N 80°06′10″W
  - elevation: 1,522 ft (464 m)
- Mouth: West Fork River
  - location: northeastern Harrison County
  - coordinates: 39°20′58″N 80°19′08″W
  - elevation: 902 ft (275 m)
- Length: 28 mi (45 km)
- Basin size: 73 sq mi (190 km^{2})

Simpson Creek is a tributary of the West Fork River, 28 miles (45 km) long, in north-central West Virginia, USA. The stream was named for hunter and trapper John Simpson, who left his name on it ("Simpson's Creek") after building and living in a cabin there for several months in 1763 and '64.

== Geography ==
Via the West Fork, Monongahela and Ohio Rivers, Simpson Creek is part of the watershed of the Mississippi River, draining an area of 73 square miles (190 km^{2}) on the unglaciated portion of the Allegheny Plateau. It rises approximately 5 miles (8.0 km) northwest of Philippi in northwestern Barbour County and flows generally northwestwardly through southeastern Taylor County and northeastern Harrison County, passing through the communities of Flemington and Bridgeport; it flows into the West Fork River approximately 4 miles (6.4 km) south-southwest of Shinnston.

According to the West Virginia Department of Environmental Protection, approximately 69% of Simpson Creek's watershed is forested, mostly deciduous. Approximately 26% is used for pasture and agriculture, and approximately 3% is urban.

== History ==
John Simpson traveled in company with a pair of deserters from the French and Indian War — brothers John and Samuel Pringle — according to 19th century writer Alexander Scott Withers:

During this year [1764] and while in the employ of John Simpson (a trapper, who had come there in quest of furs,) they [the Pringle brothers] determined on removing farther west. Simpson was induced to this, by the prospect of enjoying the woods free from the intrusion of other hunters (the glades having begun to be a common hunting ground for the inhabitants of the South Branch;) while a regard for their personal safety, caused the Pringles to avoid a situation, in which they might be exposed to the observations of other men. In journeying through the wilderness, and having crossed the Cheat river at the Horse shoe, a quarrel arose between Simpson and one of the Pringles; and notwithstanding that peace and harmony were so necessary to their mutual safety and comfort; yet each so far indulged the angry passions which had been excited, as at length to produce a separation. Simpson crossed over the [Tygart] Valley river, near the mouth of Pleasant creek, and passing on to the head of another water course, gave it the name of Simpson's creek. Thence he went westwardly, and fell over on a stream which he called Elk: at the mouth of this he erected a camp, and continued to reside [there] for more than twelve months. During this time he neither saw the Pringles nor any other human being; and at the expiration of it went to the South Branch, where he disposed of his furs and skins and then returned to, and continued at, his encampment at the mouth of Elk [present-day Clarksburg], until permanent settlements were made in the vicinity.

Simpson was apparently prone to quarreling. According to another 19th-century local historian:

Simpson’s cabin was located about one mile from Clarksburg, on the west side of the West Fork River…. Simpson became indebted to a man named Cottrial to the amount of “one quart of salt” (a precious article at the time), which he agreed to pay him, either in money or salt, upon his return from Winchester, whither he was going to dispose of a stock of skins and furs. Upon his return, a dispute arose between them, regarding the payment, and Cottrial, in the heat of passion, hastened from the house, and grasping Daniel Davisson’s gun, which stood leaning against the cabin, took aim through the space between the logs, and attempted to shoot Simpson. The latter, however, was too quick for him, and springing outside, grasped the gun from Cottrial’s hands and killed him. This was the first tragedy of this nature in the vicinity.

== Pollution ==
The water quality of Simpson Creek has been impacted by runoff from mining operations in the region, but conditions have slowly improved in some areas; a section of the creek in Bridgeport was stocked with rainbow trout in 2006.

== Variant spellings ==
According to the Geographic Names Information System, Simpson Creek has also been known historically as:

- Simpson's Creek
- Simpsons Creek
- Simpsons Crick
- Simsons Creek
- Simsons Crick

== See also ==
- List of West Virginia rivers
- Bridgeport Lamp Chimney Company Bowstring Concrete Arch Bridge
- Simpson Creek Covered Bridge
