= Elk Creek (West Virginia) =

River in West Virginia

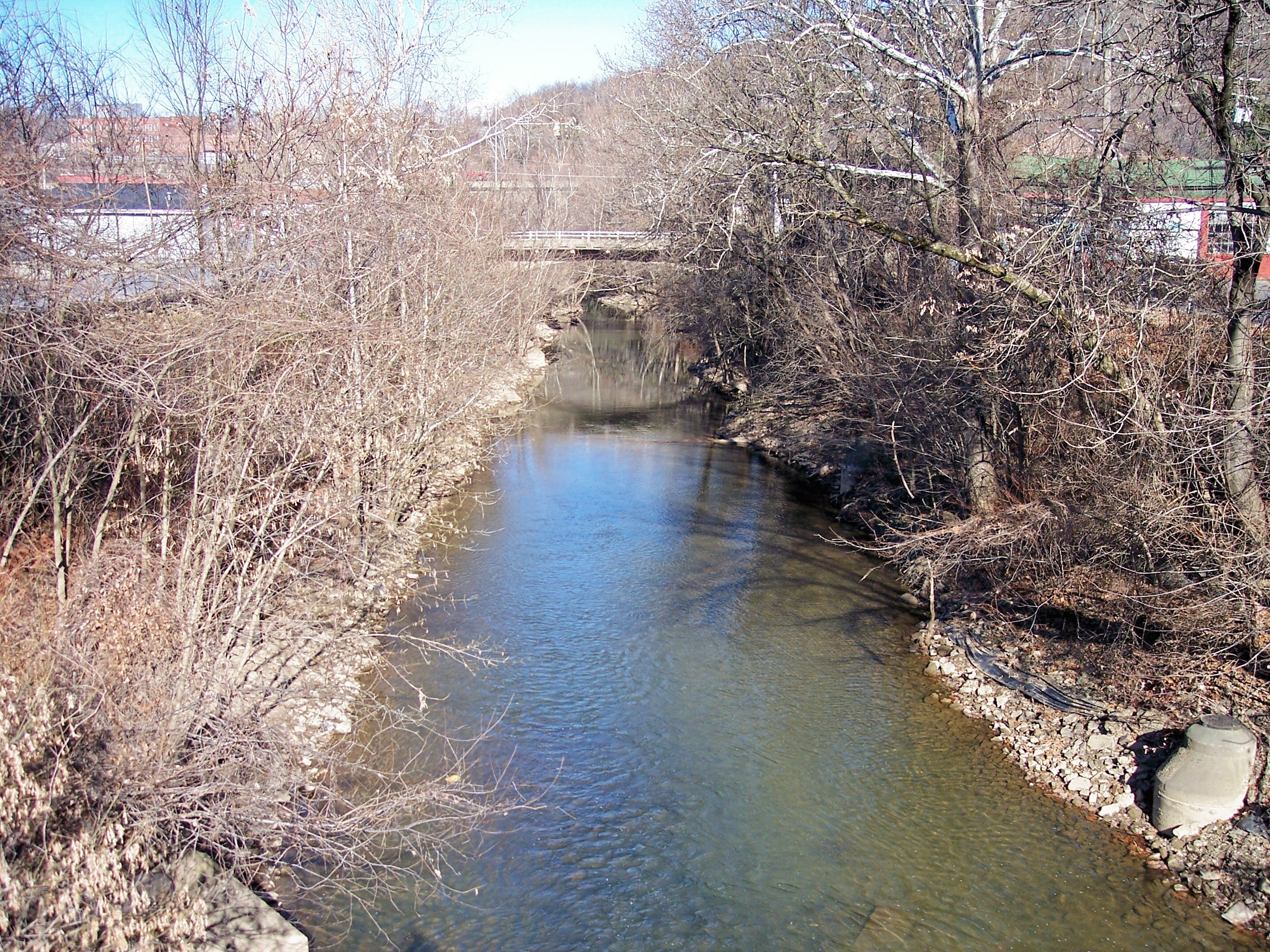
- Elk Creek in Clarksburg in 2006

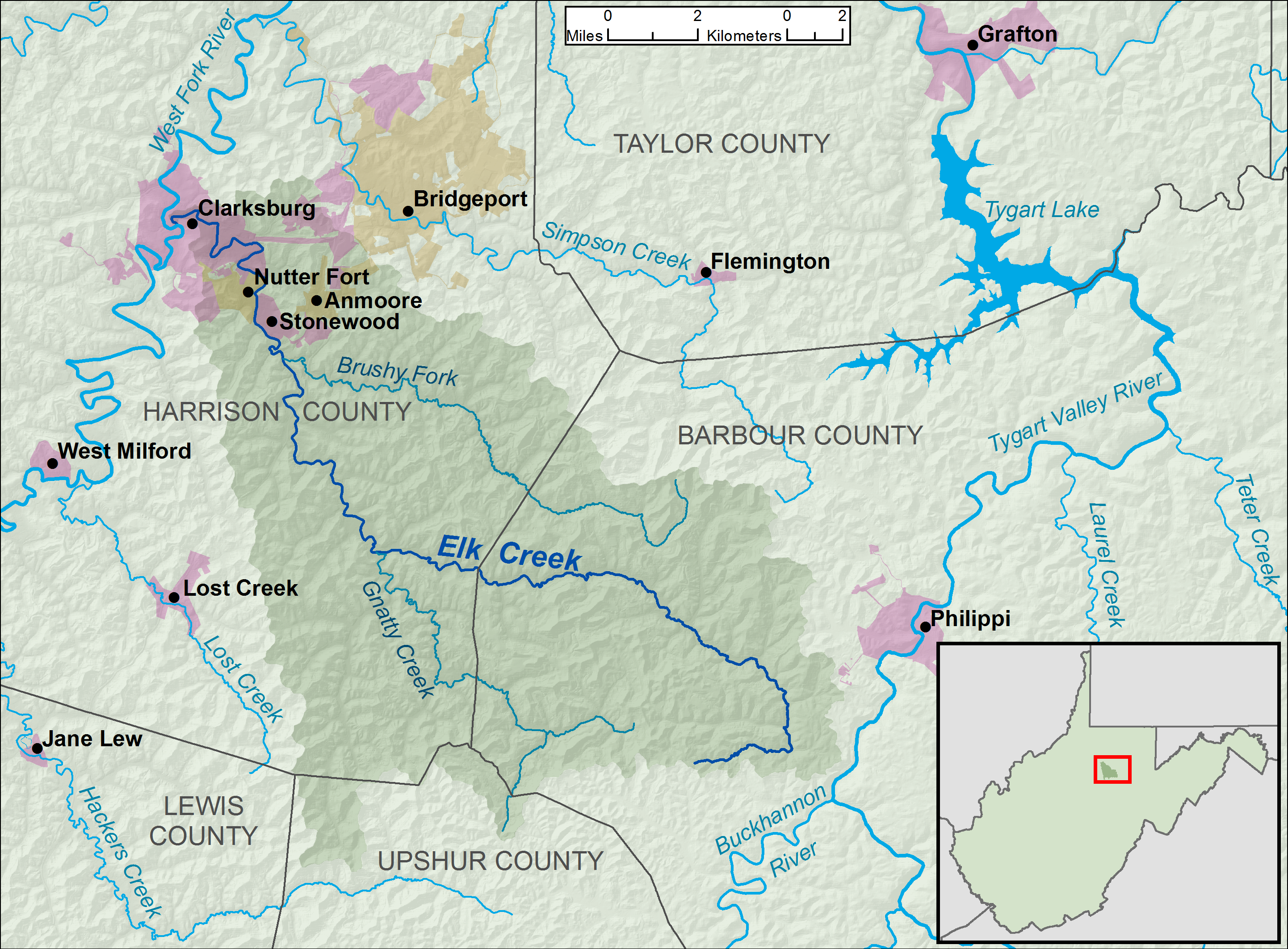
- Elk Creek and its watershed

Location
- Country: United States
- State: West Virginia
- Counties: Barbour, Harrison

Physical characteristics
- Source
  - location: Barbour County, West Virginia
  - coordinates: 39°06′32″N 80°08′07″W
  - elevation: 1,535 ft (468 m)
- Mouth: West Fork River
  - location: Clarksburg, West Virginia
  - coordinates: 39°16′55″N 80°21′06″W
  - elevation: 922 ft (281 m)
- Length: 29 mi (47 km)
- Basin size: 121 sq mi (310 km^{2})

Elk Creek is a tributary of the West Fork River, 29 miles (47 km) long, in north-central West Virginia, USA. Via the West Fork, Monongahela and Ohio Rivers, it is part of the watershed of the Mississippi River, draining an area of 121 square miles (310 km^{2}) on the unglaciated portion of the Allegheny Plateau. The stream is believed to have been named by an 18th-century trapper and hunter named John Simpson, who encountered herds of elk along the stream.

== Geography ==
Elk Creek rises approximately 6 miles (9.7 km) southwest of Philippi in western Barbour County and flows generally west-northwestwardly into Harrison County, where it passes through the communities of Stonewood and Nutter Fort; it flows into the West Fork River in the city of Clarksburg.

According to the West Virginia Department of Environmental Protection, approximately 70% of Elk Creek's watershed is forested, mostly deciduous. Approximately 22% is used for pasture and agriculture, and approximately 3% is urban.

== History ==
Hunter-trapper John Simpson — namesake of nearby Simpson's Creek — discovered and named Elk Creek. He traveled in company with a pair of deserters from the French and Indian War — brothers John and Samuel Pringle — according to 19th century writer Alexander Scott Withers:

During this year [1764] and while in the employ of John Simpson (a trapper, who had come there in quest of furs,) they the Pringle brothers determined on removing farther west. Simpson was induced to this, by the prospect of enjoying the woods free from the intrusion of other hunters (the glades having begun to be a common hunting ground for the inhabitants of the South Branch;) while a regard for their personal safety, caused the Pringles to avoid a situation, in which they might be exposed to the observations of other men. In journeying through the wilderness, and having crossed the Cheat river at the Horse shoe, a quarrel arose between Simpson and one of the Pringles; and notwithstanding that peace and harmony were so necessary to their mutual safety and comfort; yet each so far indulged the angry passions which had been excited, as at length to produce a separation. Simpson crossed over the [Tygart] Valley river, near the mouth of Pleasant creek, and passing on to the head of another water course, gave it the name of Simpson's creek. Thence he went westwardly, and fell over on a stream which he called Elk: at the mouth of this he erected a camp, and continued to reside [there] for more than twelve months. During this time he neither saw the Pringles nor any other human being; and at the expiration of it went to the South Branch, where he disposed of his furs and skins and then returned to, and continued at, his encampment at the mouth of Elk [present-day Clarksburg], until permanent settlements were made in the vicinity.

== See also ==
- List of West Virginia rivers
