= Jasper Colebank =

American football player and coach (1887–1968)

Biographical details
- Born: February 28, 1887; Evansville, West Virginia, U.S.
- Died: January 6, 1968 (aged 80); Enterprise, West Virginia, U.S.

Playing career

Football
- 1914–1915: West Virginia

Coaching career (HC unless noted)

Football
- 1922: Grafton HS (WV)
- 1924–1932: Fairmont State
- 1934–1939: Fairmont State

Basketball
- 1926–1941: Fairmont State

Administrative career (AD unless noted)
- 1925–1952: Fairmont State

Head coaching record
- Overall: 126–169 (college basketball)

Jasper Haymond Colebank (February 28, 1887 – January 6, 1968) was an American college football player and coach. He served as the head coach at Fairmont State University in Fairmont, West Virginia from 1924 to 1932 and again from 1934 to 1939. From 1926 to 1941 he was also Fairmont State's men's basketball coach. Colebank died on January 6, 1968, in Enterprise, West Virginia, of an apparent heart attack.
