= Despard =

Despard is a surname. Notable people with the surname include:

- Aileen Despard (1908–1981), Irish actress
- Catherine Despard (died 1815), British activist
- Charlotte Despard (1844–1939), British suffragette and Sinn Féin activist
- Edward Marcus Despard (1751–1803), Irish-born British colonel turned revolutionary
- George Despard, character
- Jacob Despard (born 1996), Australian sprinter
- John Despard (1744–1829), British general

== See also ==
- Despard, West Virginia
