= Manayka, West Virginia =

Manayka
- Location within West Virginia Location within the United States
- Coordinates: 39.292477°N 80.347600°W
- Country: United States
- State: West Virginia
- County: Harrison
- Time zone: UTC-5 (Eastern (EST))
  - Summer (DST): UTC-4 (EDT)
- FIPS code: 1718478

Manayka was an unincorporated community located in Harrison County, West Virginia, United States, just north of downtown Clarksburg, West Virginia.

Manayka was laid out on pasture land, directly east of neighboring North View in the area between current-day 12th Street and 18th Street on the east and west, and Rose Avenue and West Virginia Avenue on the north and south, in Clarksburg.

In 1917, Manayka and North View were annexed by Clarksburg. A post office opened in Manayka to service both communities on July 17, 1917, and remained in operation until January 15, 1928.
