= Oak Mounds =

Prehistoric earthwork mounds in Harrison County, West Virginia, U.S.

Coordinates: 39°15′48″N 80°21′56″W

The Oak Mounds is a large prehistoric earthwork mound, and a smaller mound to the west. They are located outside Clarksburg, in Harrison County, West Virginia.

While the mounds have not been completely excavated, they were probably built between 1 and 1000 CE by the Hopewell culture mound builders, prehistoric indigenous peoples of eastern North America. The larger mound is about 12 feet high and 60 feet in diameter. The mounds are believed to be burial sites for important people of the time.

An incorrectly worded historical marker sign is located on West Virginia Route 98 near the Veterans Administration Hospital. The sign erroneously states the direction the mounds are "[d]irectly to the east" of the sign itself; however, the mounds are actually to the west, on the far side of the West Fork River. The sign's entire inscription reads: "Oak Mounds - Directly to the east are two earthen, domed burial mounds. The larger mound is some sixty feet in diameter and twelve feet high. Excavations in 1969 revealed flint tools, pottery shards and skeletal remains of two individuals. Site dates to about 100 BC, late Woodland Period."

== See also ==
- Mound
- Mound builder (people)
- Effigy mound
- Earthwork (archaeology)
- Tumulus - burial mound
- List of Hopewell sites
