= Wolf Summit, West Virginia =

- Census-designated place
- Location within West Virginia Location within the United States
- Coordinates: 39°16′51″N 80°27′39″W
- Country: United States
- State: West Virginia
- County: Harrison

Area
  - Total: 0.364 sq mi (0.94 km^{2})
  - Land: 0.364 sq mi (0.94 km^{2})
  - Water: 0 sq mi (0 km^{2})
- Elevation: 1,119 ft (341 m)

Population (2020)
  - Total: 214
  - Density: 588/sq mi (227/km^{2})
- Time zone: UTC-5 (Eastern (EST))
  - Summer (DST): UTC-4 (EDT)
- Area codes: 304 & 681
- GNIS feature ID: 1556016

Wolf Summit is a census-designated place and coal town in Harrison County, West Virginia, United States. Its population was 214 at the 2020 census (down from 272 at the 2010 census).

The community was named after the surname Wolf and its being the highest point on the railroad between Grafton and Parkersburg.
