= Carrion Run =

Stream in West Virginia, U.S.

Coordinates: 38°57′17″N 80°29′44″W

Carrion Run is a stream in Lewis County, West Virginia.

It is a tributary of the West Fork River. Carrion Run was named for an incident when the decaying bodies of skinned deer were left near the creek.

== See also ==
- List of rivers of West Virginia
