= West Virginia Route 58 =

State highway in West Virginia, United States

West Virginia Route 58

Route information
- Maintained by WVDOH
- Length: 6.0 mi (9.7 km)

Major junctions
- West end: WV 20 in Stonewood
- I-79 in Anmoore
- East end: US 50 in Bridgeport

Location
- Country: United States
- State: West Virginia
- Counties: Harrison

Highway system
- West Virginia State Highway System; Interstate; US; State
← WV 57	→ WV 59

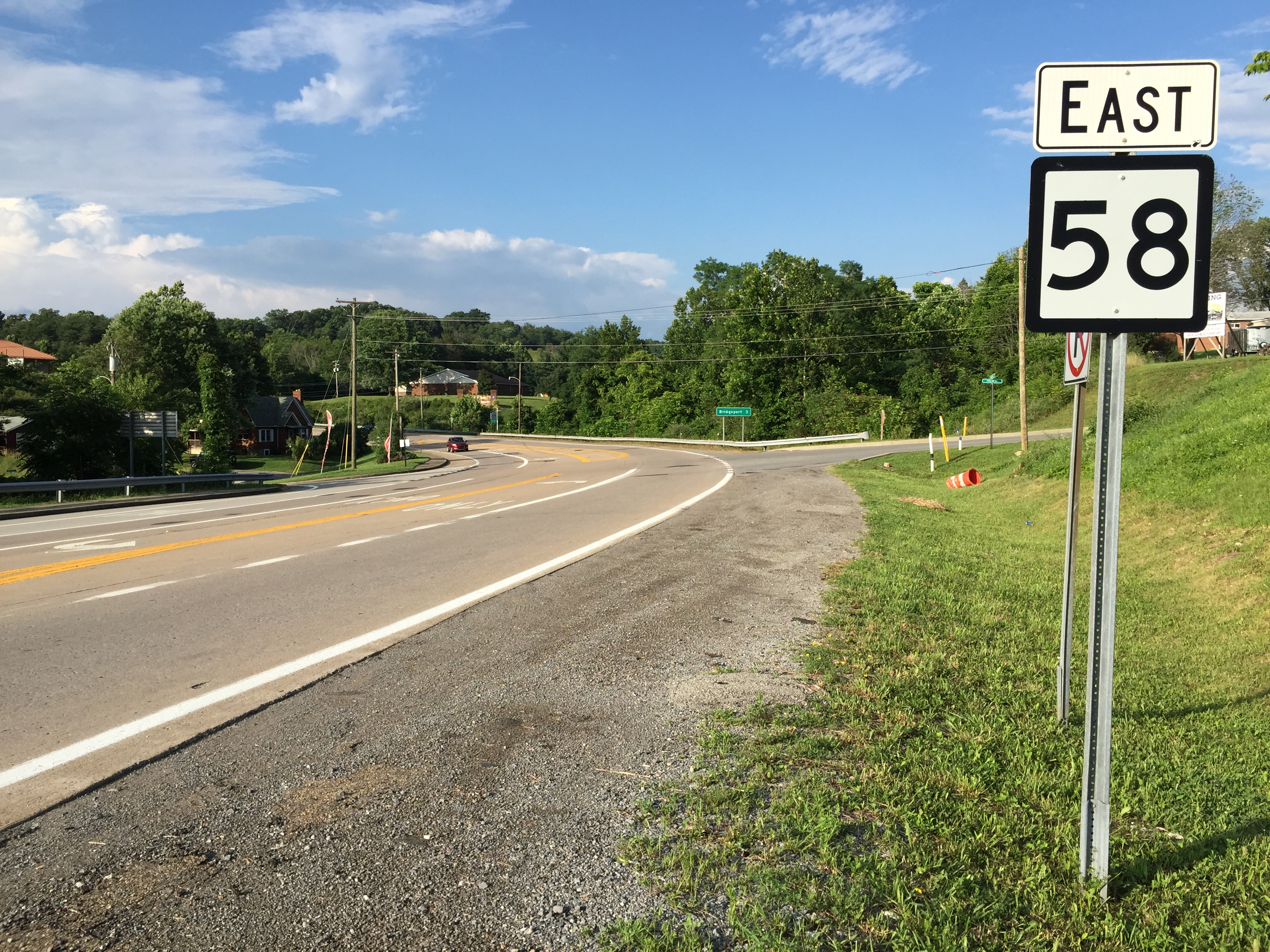
View east along WV 58 at I-79 in Anmoore

West Virginia Route 58 is an east–west state highway in Harrison County, West Virginia. The western terminus of the route is at West Virginia Route 20 outside Stonewood. The eastern terminus is at U.S. Route 50 in Bridgeport.

== Major intersections ==
The entire route is in Harrison County.

Location	mi	km	Destinations	Notes
Nutter Fort			WV 20 – Buckhannon, Clarksburg	
Anmoore			I-79 – Clarksburg, Charleston	I-79 exit 117
Bridgeport			US 50 to I-79	
1.000 mi = 1.609 km; 1.000 km = 0.621 mi
