= Cap Run =

Stream in West Virginia, United States

Coordinates: 38°52′52″N 80°28′33″W

Cap Run is a stream in Lewis county in the U.S. state of West Virginia. Cap Run is a tributary of West Fork River.

Cap Run was so named on account of there being a war bonnet discovered along its course.

== See also ==
- List of rivers of West Virginia
