= Ken Ash =

American baseball player (1901–1979)

- Pitcher
- Born: September 16, 1901; Anmoore, West Virginia, U.S.
- Died: November 15, 1979 (aged 78); Clarksburg, West Virginia, U.S.
- Batted: Right Threw: Right

MLB debut
- April 17, 1925, for the Chicago White Sox

Last MLB appearance
- September 26, 1930, for the Cincinnati Reds

MLB statistics
- Win–loss record: 6–8
- Earned run average: 4.96
- Strikeouts: 47
- Stats at Baseball Reference

Teams
- Chicago White Sox (1925); Cincinnati Reds (1928–1930)

Kenneth Lowther Ash (September 26, 1901 – November 15, 1979) was a Major League Baseball pitcher. He was born in Anmoore, West Virginia on September 16, 1901. He batted and threw right-handed, was 5 foot 11, and 165 pounds. Ken attended school at West Virginia Wesleyan College. Ash pitched in two games in the 1925 season for the Chicago White Sox with an ERA of 9.00.

He played for the Cincinnati Reds in the 1928-1930 seasons with 53 games and 158 innings pitched. In his career, Ken had a 6–8 record in 55 games, allowing 6 home runs and an ERA of 4.96.

On July 27, 1930, Ash earned a win against the Chicago Cubs with just one inning of relief and with him only throwing one pitch. Ash was called in to relief by Cincinnati Manager Dan Howley with the Reds trailing 3–2 in the top of sixth. The Cubs had two runners on base, Hack Wilson on third, and Danny Taylor on first. At the plate for Chicago was Charlie Grimm. Grimm grounded Ash's first pitch to Reds shortstop Hod Ford. Wilson broke for home. Ford threw the ball to Reds third baseman Tony Cuccinello who then threw to Reds catcher Clyde Sukeforth who successfully ran down Wilson and tagged him for out number one. In the meantime, Grimm after reaching first base set off for second. Taylor was still occupying that base. Grimm tried returning to first, but Sukeforth threw the ball to Reds first baseman Joe Stripp. Stripp tagged Grimm for out number two.

Taylor took off for third base. Stripp threw the ball to Cuccinello who tagged Taylor out to complete a 6-5-2-3-5 triple play. Ken Ash was pinch hit for in the bottom of the sixth and Cincinnati scored four runs to take the lead which they held.
