= Spelter, West Virginia =

- Census-designated place
- Location within West Virginia Location within the United States
- Coordinates: 39°20′42″N 80°19′04″W
- Country: United States
- State: West Virginia
- County: Harrison

Area
  - Total: 0.495 sq mi (1.28 km^{2})
  - Land: 0.495 sq mi (1.28 km^{2})
  - Water: 0 sq mi (0 km^{2})
- Elevation: 1,007 ft (307 m)

Population (2020)
  - Total: 244
  - Density: 493/sq mi (190/km^{2})
- Time zone: UTC-5 (Eastern (EST))
  - Summer (DST): UTC-4 (EDT)
- ZIP code: 26438
- Area codes: 304 & 681
- GNIS feature ID: 1555681

Spelter is a census-designated place (CDP) in Harrison County, West Virginia, United States. Spelter is 4.5 miles (7.2 km) north of Clarksburg. Spelter has a post office with ZIP code 26438. As of the 2020 census, its population was 244 (down from 346 at the 2010 census).

An early variant name was Ziesing.
