= West Virginia Route 270 =

State highway in West Virginia, United States

West Virginia Route 270

Route information
- Maintained by WVDOH
- Length: 5.9 mi (9.5 km)

Major junctions
- West end: US 19 in West Milford
- East end: I-79 in Lost Creek

Location
- Country: United States
- State: West Virginia
- Counties: Harrison

Highway system
- West Virginia State Highway System; Interstate; US; State
← WV 259	→ WV 273

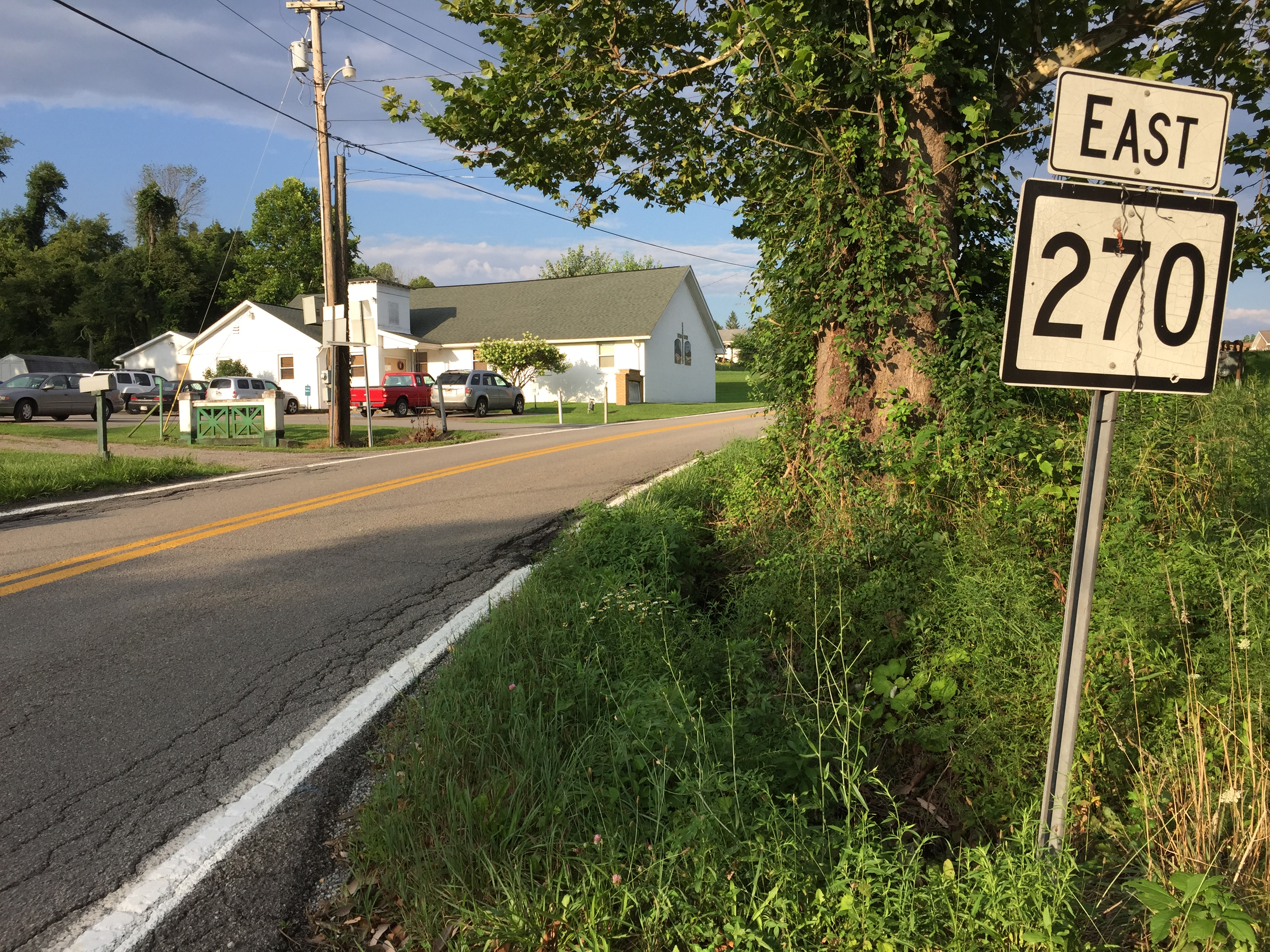
View east along WV 270 at US 19 in West Milford

West Virginia Route 270 is an east–west state highway located entirely within Harrison County, West Virginia. The western terminus of the route is at U.S. Route 19 just outside the western edge of West Milford. The eastern terminus is at Interstate 79 exit 110 in Lost Creek.

WV 270 was formerly County Route 27.

== Major intersections ==
The entire route is in Harrison County.

Location	mi	km	Destinations	Notes
			US 19	
Lost Creek			I-79 south – Charleston	I-79 exit 110
Lost Creek			CR 25 (Mount Clare Lost Creek Road) to I-79 north	
1.000 mi = 1.609 km; 1.000 km = 0.621 mi
