= Tenmile Creek (West Fork River tributary) =

Tributary of river in West Virginia

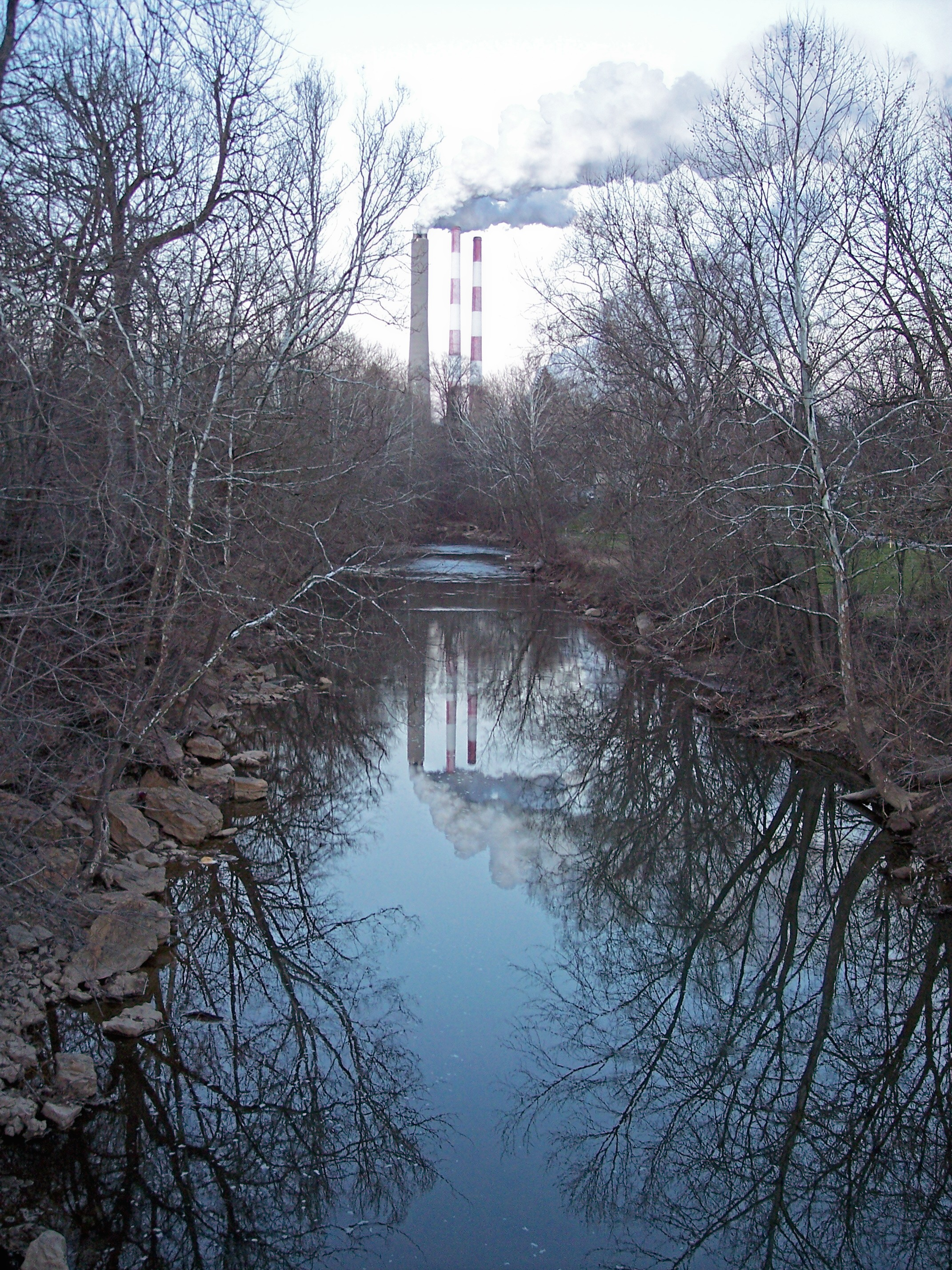
- Tenmile Creek in Lumberport in 2006

- Location of the mouth of Tenmile Creek in Lumberport, West Virginia

Location
- Country: United States
- State: West Virginia
- County: Harrison County

Physical characteristics
- Source
  - location: southwestern Harrison County
  - coordinates: 39°12′17″N 80°31′36″W
  - elevation: 1,289 ft (393 m)
- Mouth: West Fork River
  - location: Lumberport
  - coordinates: 39°22′39″N 80°20′21″W
  - elevation: 892 ft (272 m)
- Length: 26.4 mi (42.5 km)
- Basin size: 126 sq mi (330 km^{2})

Tenmile Creek is a tributary of the West Fork River, 26.4 miles (42.5 km) long, in north-central West Virginia in the United States. Via the West Fork, Monongahela and Ohio Rivers, it is part of the watershed of the Mississippi River, draining an area of 126 square miles (330 km^{2}) on the unglaciated portion of the Allegheny Plateau.

== Location and tributaries ==
Tenmile Creek and its watershed are located entirely in western and northern Harrison County. It rises in the southwestern part of the county, approximately 8 miles (13 km) west of West Milford, and flows northwardly and northeastwardly to the town of Lumberport, where it joins the West Fork River from the southwest. Its tributaries include Salem Fork, which drains the city of Salem; and Little Tenmile Creek, 13 miles (21 km) long, which flows southeastwardly through northwestern Harrison County and the small communities of Wallace, Brown, Dola, and Rosebud.

== Watershed ==
According to the West Virginia Department of Environmental Protection, approximately 81% of Tenmile Creek's watershed is forested, mostly deciduous. Approximately 13% is used for pasture and agriculture, and less than 1% is urban.

== Alternative name ==
According to the Geographic Names Information System, Tenmile Creek has also been known historically as Coal Bank Creek.

== See also ==
- Fletcher Covered Bridge
- List of West Virginia rivers
