= Gypsy, West Virginia =

- Census-designated place
- Location within West Virginia
- Coordinates: 39°22′7″N 80°19′4″W
- Country: United States
- State: West Virginia
- County: Harrison

Area
  - Total: 0.777 sq mi (2.01 km^{2})
  - Land: 0.777 sq mi (2.01 km^{2})
  - Water: 0 sq mi (0 km^{2})

Population (2020)
  - Total: 197
  - Density: 254/sq mi (97.9/km^{2})
- Time zone: UTC-5 (Eastern (EST))
  - Summer (DST): UTC-4 (EDT)
- ZIP codes: 26361

Gypsy is a census-designated place (CDP) in Harrison County, West Virginia, United States. As of the 2020 census, its population was 197 (down from 328 at the 2010 census).

== History ==
A post office called Gypsy has been in operation since 1900. The community was named for a band of Roma which once camped in the area, according to local history. Gypsy was located on the Baltimore and Ohio Railroad.
