= Watters Smith Memorial State Park =

State Park in Harrison County, West Virginia

- IUCN category III (natural monument or feature)
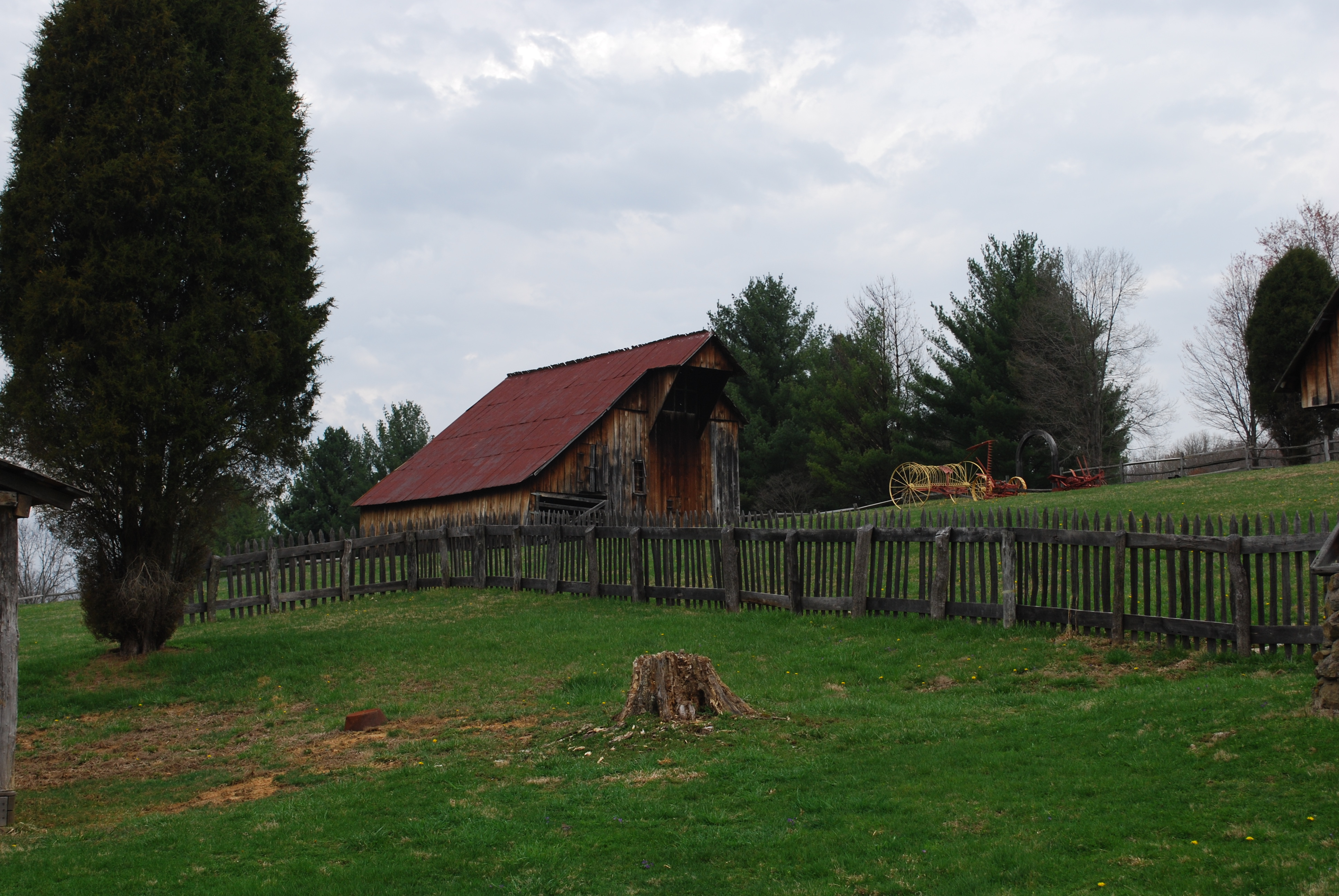
- Buildings from the Watters Smith family farm.

- Location within West Virginia
- Location: Harrison, West Virginia, United States
- Coordinates: 39°10′16″N 80°24′29″W
- Area: 532 acres (215 ha)
- Elevation: 1,033 ft (315 m)
- Established: 1949
- Named for: Watters Smith
- Governing body: West Virginia Division of Natural Resources
- Website: wvstateparks.com/park/watters-smith-memorial-state-park/

Watters Smith Memorial State Park is a 532-acre (2.15 km^{2}) historical park and national historic district with a pioneer homestead and museum located in Harrison County, West Virginia. The homestead, rising above Duck Creek, is a memorial to settler Watters Smith, who was born in Trenton, New Jersey, in 1767, and moved to Harrison County, in what was then Virginia, in 1796, with his wife, Elizabeth Davisson Smith. A log cabin similar to the original was moved and reconstructed in the park, together with farm buildings typical of early 19th-century settlements. The more modern Smith family home (c. 1876) has been restored as a museum, and an additional museum houses many local farm artifacts from earlier eras. Guided tours are offered from Memorial Day weekend through Labor Day. In addition, the park features swimming, picnicking, hiking trails, and horseback riding.

It was listed on the National Register of Historic Places in 1974 as the Watters Smith Farm on Duck Creek.

== Mountain biking ==
Watters Smith Park is used for mountain biking. The park includes a bike wash, a maintenance area, and over 12 miles of single-track riding with technical sections and elevation gains. Featuring maps and marked trails, the park has trails designated for beginner to expert skill levels.

== See also ==
- List of West Virginia state parks
- State park
- Open-air museum
