= Lumberport, West Virginia =

- Town
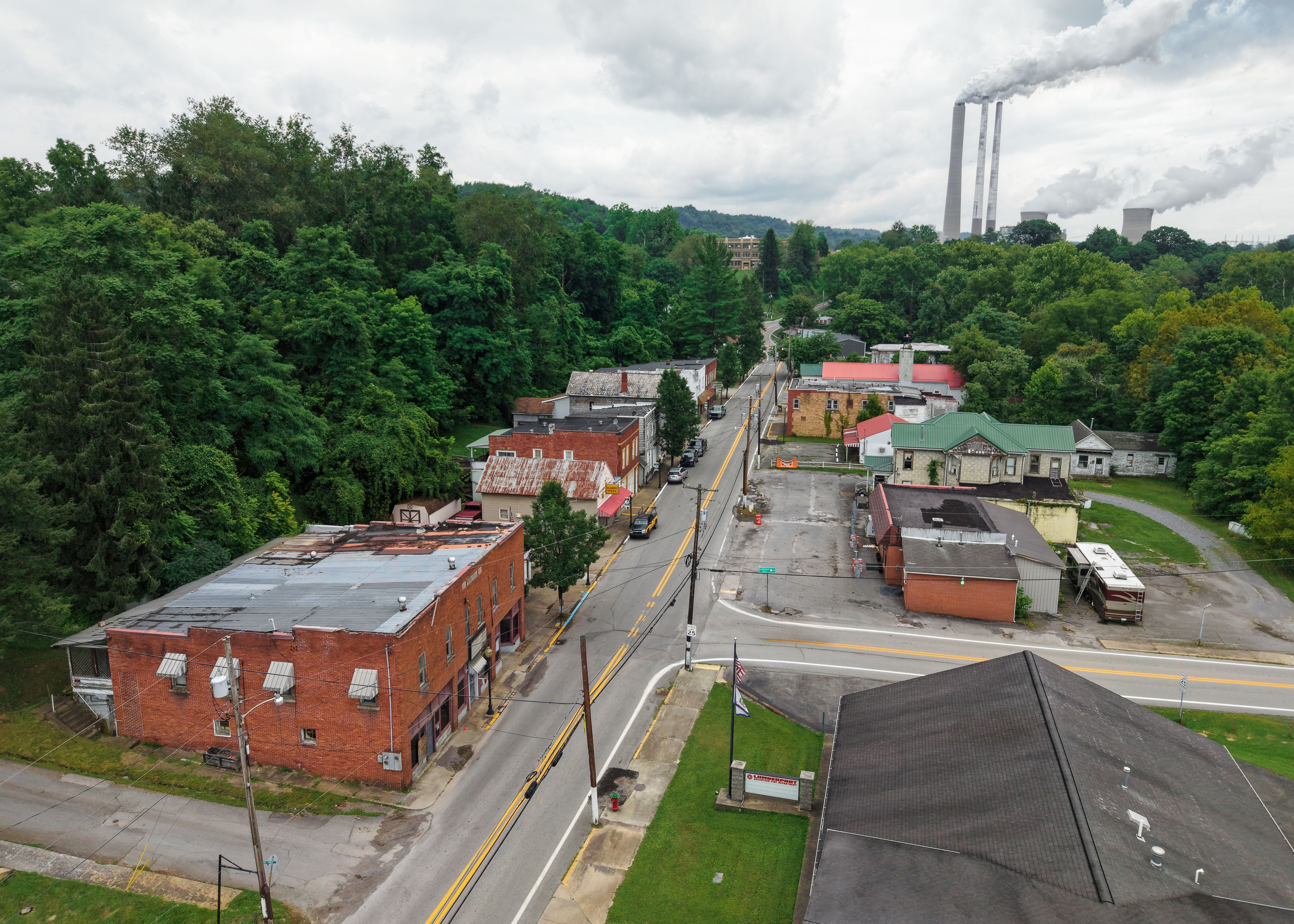
- Downtown (2026)

- Seal

- Location of Lumberport in Harrison County, West Virginia.
- Coordinates: 39°22′30″N 80°20′54″W
- Country: United States
- State: West Virginia
- County: Harrison

Area
  - Total: 0.50 sq mi (1.30 km^{2})
  - Land: 0.50 sq mi (1.30 km^{2})
  - Water: 0 sq mi (0.00 km^{2})
- Elevation: 925 ft (282 m)

Population (2020)
  - Total: 717
  - Estimate (2021): 710
  - Density: 1,669/sq mi (644.4/km^{2})
- Time zone: UTC-5 (Eastern (EST))
  - Summer (DST): UTC-4 (EDT)
- ZIP code: 26386
- Area code: 304
- FIPS code: 54-49252
- GNIS feature ID: 1542612
- Website: https://wvlumberport.com/

Lumberport is a town in Harrison County, located in northern West Virginia, United States. The population was 720 at the 2020 census.

The rural town was so named on account of the extensive lumber industry conducted there in the early 20th century. With changes in the lumber industry, the number of jobs declined, leading to a loss in population after the 1950s.

== Geography ==
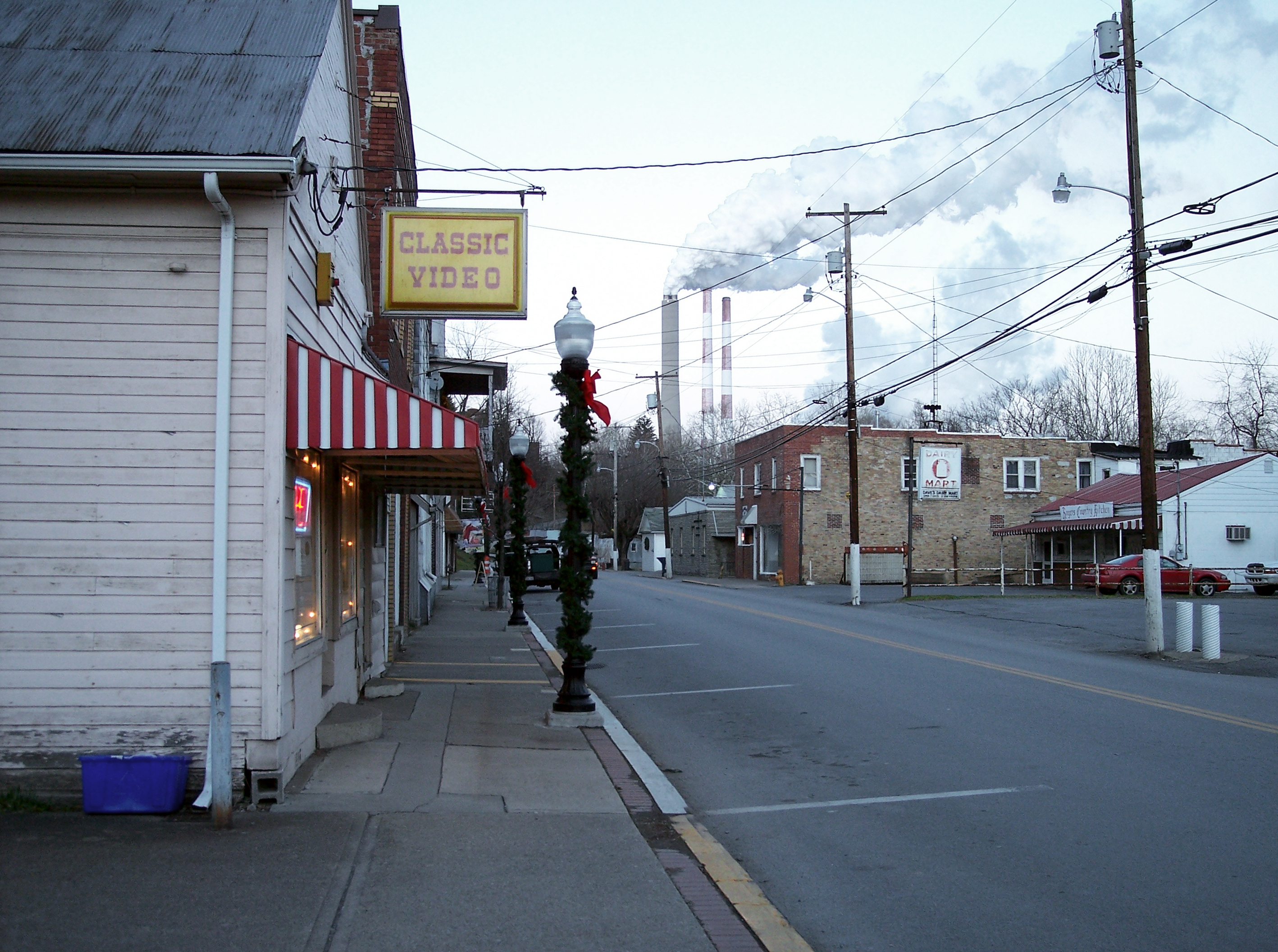
Main Street (West Virginia Route 20) in Lumberport in 2006

Lumberport is located at 39°22′30″N 80°20′54″W (39.375041, -80.348213), at the confluence of Tenmile Creek and the West Fork River in northern Harrison County.

According to the United States Census Bureau, the town has a total area of 0.50 square miles (1.29 km^{2}), all land.

== Demographics ==
Historical population
Census	Pop.	Note	%±
1910	656		—
1920	900		37.2%
1930	1,298		44.2%
1940	1,285		−1.0%
1950	1,198		−6.8%
1960	1,031		−13.9%
1970	957		−7.2%
1980	939		−1.9%
1990	1,014		8.0%
2000	937		−7.6%
2010	876		−6.5%
2020	717		−18.2%
2021 (est.)	710	▼	−1.0%
U.S. Decennial Census

=== 2010 census ===
As of the census of 2010, there were 876 people, 350 households, and 241 families living in the town. There were 384 housing units. The racial makeup of the town was 98.4% White, 0.5% African American, 0% Native American, 0% Asian, and 0.9% from two or more races. Hispanic or Latino of any race were 1.0% of the population.

There were 350 households, of which 32.6% had children under the age of 18 living with them, 49.7% were married couples living together, 14.6% had a female householder with no husband present, and 31.1% were non-families. 32.6% of all households had individuals under 18 years and 30.0% had someone who was 65 years of age or older. The average household size was 2.50 and the average family size was 3.01.

In the town, the population age distribution is 26.3% under the age of 20, 31.8% from 20 to 44, 27.2% from 45 to 64, and 14.8% who were 65 years of age or older. The median age was 39.8 years. 50.8 percent of the population was male and 49.2 female.

The median income for a household in the town was $38,625, and the median income for a family was $44,231. The per capita income for the town was $19,710. About 11.0% of the population was below the poverty line, including 14.1% of those under age 18 and 6% of those age 65 or over.

=== 2000 census ===
As of the census of 2000, there were 937 people, 353 households, and 273 families living in the town. The population density was 1,855.1 inhabitants per square mile (716.3 inhabitants/km^{2}). There were 388 housing units at an average density of 768.2 units per square mile (296.6 units/km^{2}). The racial makeup of the town was 98.93% White, 0.43% African American, 0.32% Native American, 0.11% Asian, and 0.21% from two or more races. Hispanic or Latino of any race were 0.21% of the population.

There were 353 households, out of which 33.7% had children under the age of 18 living with them, 58.1% were married couples living together, 14.4% had a female householder with no husband present, and 22.4% were non-families. 21.8% of all households were made up of individuals, and 9.9% had someone living alone who was 65 years of age or older. The average household size was 2.63 and the average family size was 3.03.

In the town, the age distribution is 26.6% under the age of 18, 6.1% from 18 to 24, 29.9% from 25 to 44, 22.4% from 45 to 64, and 15.0% who were 65 years of age or older. The median age was 37 years. For every 100 females, there were 92.0 males. For every 100 females age 18 and over, there were 85.4 males.

The median income for a household in the town was $33,750, and the median income for a family was $38,462. Males had a median income of $27,500 versus $21,719 for females. The per capita income for the town was $13,904. About 8.7% of families and 12.8% of the population were below the poverty line, including 17.8% of those under age 18 and 10.1% of those age 65 or over.
