= Despard, West Virginia =

- CDP
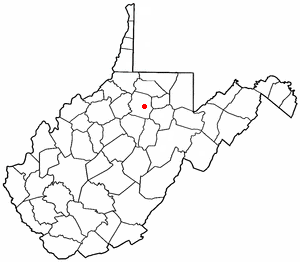
- Location of Despard, West Virginia
- Coordinates: 39°16′57″N 80°18′48″W
- Country: United States
- State: West Virginia
- County: Harrison

Area
  - Total: 1.5 sq mi (3.8 km^{2})
  - Land: 1.5 sq mi (3.8 km^{2})
  - Water: 0 sq mi (0.0 km^{2})
- Elevation: 1,043 ft (318 m)

Population (2020)
  - Total: 794
  - Density: 540/sq mi (210/km^{2})
- Time zone: UTC-5 (Eastern (EST))
  - Summer (DST): UTC-4 (EDT)
- Area code: 304
- FIPS code: 54-21316
- GNIS feature ID: 1554296

Despard is a census-designated place (CDP) in Harrison County, West Virginia, United States. The population was 794 at the 2020 census (down from 1,004 at the 2010 census).

Despard was home to the largest manufacturing enterprise in north central West Virginia in the early 1900s, the Jackson Sheet and Tin Plate Company, after 1905 known as the Phillips Sheet and Tin Plate Company, or simply the "Tin Plate Mill."

== History ==
In July 1901, the Jackson Sheet and Tin Plate Company, capitalized at $300,000, was incorporated by Ingraham Grove of Cleveland; C.C. Moore of Columbus, and T.M. Jackson, C.S. Sands, Fleming Howell and L.S. Hornor of Clarksburg.

It was sold (new, never operated) at bankruptcy auction to Pittsburgh partners, James R. Phillips and Ernest T. Weir, and the name was changed to Phillips Sheet & Tinplate Co.. One month after operations began, senior partner J. R. Phillips was killed in a train wreck, when the Pullman sleeper he was resting in on a siding was struck by a passing train. Either the sleeper car had not been completely onto the siding or a load of steel on a passing freight car shifted. Phillips secretary E. T. Weir then took the helm of the company and tinmill became the first Weirton Steel Company.

Summit Park, also called Greektown or especially Tinplate and Tin Plate, was in the area. It was the community of many immigrant Greeks and other nationalities, who had been recruited to work as tin workers at Weirton Steel Mill. Weirton Steel closed its gates in October 1936. The buildings were then occupied by other manufacturing firms.

== Geography ==
Despard is located at 39°16′57″N 80°18′48″W (39.282369, -80.313338).

According to the United States Census Bureau, the CDP has a total area of 1.5 square miles (3.8 km^{2}), all land.

== Demographics ==
As of the census of 2000, there were 1,039 people, 392 households, and 286 families residing in the CDP. The population density was 706.7 people per square mile (272.9/km^{2}). There were 431 housing units at an average density of 293.2/sq mi (113.2/km^{2}). The racial makeup of the CDP was 96.73% White, 2.31% African American, 0.10% from other races, and 0.87% from two or more races. Hispanic or Latino of any race were 0.29% of the population.

There were 392 households, out of which 32.7% had children under the age of 18 living with them, 52.3% were married couples living together, 13.8% had a female householder with no husband present, and 27.0% were non-families. 25.3% of all households were made up of individuals, and 11.0% had someone living alone who was 65 years of age or older. The average household size was 2.65 and the average family size was 3.14.

In the CDP, the population was spread out, with 26.3% under the age of 18, 7.5% from 18 to 24, 29.5% from 25 to 44, 23.1% from 45 to 64, and 13.7% who were 65 years of age or older. The median age was 36 years. For every 100 females, there were 92.8 males. For every 100 females age 18 and over, there were 92.9 males.

The median income for a household in the CDP was $19,740, and the median income for a family was $23,750. Males had a median income of $30,132 versus $24,167 for females. The per capita income for the CDP was $9,562. About 34.7% of families and 35.7% of the population were below the poverty line, including 45.1% of those under age 18 and 6.5% of those age 65 or over.
