= Pleasant Valley, Marion County, West Virginia =

City in West Virginia, US

Pleasant Valley, West Virginia
- City
- Flag Seal

- Location of Pleasant Valley in Marion County, West Virginia.
- Coordinates: 39°27′5″N 80°8′57″W
- Country: United States
- State: West Virginia
- County: Marion
- Incorporated: 1995

Government
  - Type: Strong Mayor-Council Government
  - Mayor: Emily Haddix

Area
  - Total: 3.41 sq mi (8.82 km^{2})
  - Land: 3.23 sq mi (8.37 km^{2})
  - Water: 0.17 sq mi (0.45 km^{2})
- Elevation: 1,030 ft (314 m)

Population (2020)
  - Total: 3,506
  - Estimate (2021): 3,492
  - Density: 972.2/sq mi (375.35/km^{2})
- Time zone: UTC-5 (Eastern (EST))
  - Summer (DST): UTC-4 (EDT)
- ZIP codes: 26554-26555
- Area code: 304
- FIPS code: 54-64228
- GNIS feature ID: 1555370
- Website: http://www.cityofpleasantvalley.com

Pleasant Valley is a city in Marion County, West Virginia, United States. The population was 3,506 at the 2020 census.

== Geography ==
Pleasant Valley is located at 39°27′5″N 80°8′57″W (39.451522, -80.149085). It is immediately south of the larger city and county seat of Fairmont, West Virginia. The city is also adjacent to the Tygart Valley River.

According to the United States Census Bureau, the city has a total area of 3.41 square miles (8.83 km^{2}), of which 3.23 square miles (8.37 km^{2}) is land and 0.18 square miles (0.47 km^{2}) is water.

=== Transportation ===
- Interstate 79
- Fairmont Municipal - Frankman Field Airport (FAA Code 4G7)

== Demographics ==
Historical population
Census	Pop.	Note	%±
2000	3,124		—
2010	3,149		0.8%
2020	3,506		11.3%
2021 (est.)	3,492		−0.4%
U.S. Decennial Census

The median income for a household in the city was $37,931, and the median income for a family was $47,330. Full-time, year-round male workers had a median income of $45,234 versus $37,132 for female workers. The per capita income for the city was $22,335. About 9.7% of families and 16.3% of the population were below the poverty line, including 19.8% of those under age 18 and 8.4% of those age 65 or over.

=== 2010 census ===
As of the census of 2010, there were 3,149 people, 1,401 households, and 870 families living in the city. The population density was 974.9 inhabitants per square mile (376.4/km^{2}). There were 1,513 housing units at an average density of 468.4 per square mile (180.9/km^{2}). The racial makeup of the city was 95.9% White, 1.4% African American, 0.1% Native American, 1.1% Asian, 0.2% from other races, and 1.3% from two or more races. Hispanic or Latino of any race were 0.6% of the population.

There were 1,401 households, of which 26.1% had children under the age of 18 living with them, 47.0% were married couples living together, 11.1% had a female householder with no husband present, 4.0% had a male householder with no wife present, and 37.9% were non-families. 30.8% of all households were made up of individuals, and 12.4% had someone living alone who was 65 years of age or older. The average household size was 2.21 and the average family size was 2.76.

The median age in the city was 40.5 years. 21.2% of residents were under the age of 18; 8% were between the ages of 18 and 24; 26.2% were from 25 to 44; 28.1% were from 45 to 64; and 16.6% were 65 years of age or older. The gender makeup of the city was 48.9% male and 51.1% female.
