= Enterprise, West Virginia =

- Census-designated place (CDP)
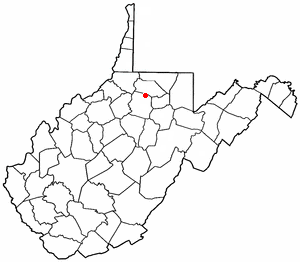
- Location of Enterprise, West Virginia
- Coordinates: 39°25′11″N 80°16′36″W
- Country: United States
- State: West Virginia
- County: Harrison

Area
  - Total: 2.9 sq mi (7.6 km^{2})
  - Land: 2.9 sq mi (7.6 km^{2})
  - Water: 0 sq mi (0.0 km^{2})
- Elevation: 950 ft (290 m)

Population (2020)
  - Total: 805
  - Density: 270/sq mi (110/km^{2})
- Time zone: UTC-5 (Eastern (EST))
  - Summer (DST): UTC-4 (EDT)
- ZIP code: 26568
- Area code: 304
- FIPS code: 54-25516
- GNIS feature ID: 1554406

Enterprise is a census-designated place (CDP) in Harrison County, West Virginia, United States, along the West Fork River. The population was 805 at the 2020 census (down from 961 at the 2010 census).

== Geography ==
Enterprise is located at 39°25′11″N 80°16′36″W (39.419860, -80.276738).

According to the United States Census Bureau, the CDP has a total area of 2.9 square miles (7.5 km^{2}), all land.

== Demographics ==
As of the census of 2000, there were 939 people, 378 households, and 275 families residing in the CDP. The population density was 319.8 people per square mile (123.5 people/km^{2}). There were 413 housing units at an average density of 140.7 per square mile (54.3/km^{2}). The racial makeup of the CDP was 99.89% White, and 0.11% from two or more races. Hispanic or Latino of any race were 0.64% of the population.

There were 378 households, out of which 27.2% had children under the age of 18 living with them, 61.1% were married couples living together, 10.1% had a female householder with no husband present, and 27.0% were non-families. 24.6% of all households were made up of individuals, and 13.8% had someone living alone who was 65 years of age or older. The average household size was 2.48 and the average family size was 2.94.

In the CDP, the population was spread out, with 21.7% under the age of 18, 7.7% from 18 to 24, 27.5% from 25 to 44, 26.1% from 45 to 64, and 17.0% who were 65 years of age or older. The median age was 41 years. For every 100 females, there were 93.2 males. For every 100 females age 18 and over, there were 92.4 males.

The median income for a household in the CDP was $29,583, and the median income for a family was $35,417. Males had a median income of $27,798 versus $20,341 for females. The per capita income for the CDP was $13,541. About 13.1% of families and 20.2% of the population were below the poverty line, including 30.3% of those under age 18 and 19.0% of those age 65 or over.
