= Anmoore, West Virginia =

- Town
- Logo

- Location of Anmoore in Harrison County, West Virginia.
- Coordinates: 39°15′30″N 80°17′17″W
- Country: United States
- State: West Virginia
- County: Harrison
- Incorporated: 1950

Government
  - Mayor: P. Eddie Hardman

Area
  - Total: 1.06 sq mi (2.74 km^{2})
  - Land: 1.06 sq mi (2.74 km^{2})
  - Water: 0 sq mi (0.00 km^{2})
- Elevation: 1,014 ft (309 m)

Population (2020)
  - Total: 513
  - Estimate (2021): 508
  - Density: 694.6/sq mi (268.17/km^{2})
- Time zone: UTC-5 (Eastern (EST))
  - Summer (DST): UTC-4 (EDT)
- ZIP code: 26323
- Area code: 304
- FIPS code: 54-01900
- GNIS feature ID: 1534961
- Website: https://www.anmoorewv.com/

Anmoore is a town in Harrison County, West Virginia, United States. It is located at the intersection of WV 58 and Interstate 79. The population was 514 at the 2020 census.

The town derives its name from nearby Ann Moore Run.

== Geography ==
Anmoore is located at 39°15′30″N 80°17′17″W (39.258328, -80.287987).

According to the United States Census Bureau, the town has a total area of 1.06 square miles (2.75 km^{2}), all land.

== History ==
The community was first settled by Andrew Cottrill (1736–1781) in 1772.

In 1903, 453 acres were purchased to create the Steelton Addition to the city of Clarksburg and representatives of the Cleveland, Ohio based Grasselli Chemical company agreed to locate a plant on the property. In May 1904, operations began at the first unit of the chemical plant employing 50. In June 1904, plans were developed to construct houses to rent to plant employees. Many of the workers were immigrants from Asturias, Spain. In 1917, a post office was established and given the name of Anmoore. In December 1950, the city was incorporated and Victor Gonzalez was elected the first mayor.

== Demographics ==
Historical population
Census	Pop.	Note	%±
1960	1,050		—
1970	944		−10.1%
1980	865		−8.4%
1990	686		−20.7%
2000	685		−0.1%
2010	770		12.4%
2020	513		−33.4%
2021 (est.)	508	▼	−1.0%
U.S. Decennial Census

=== 2010 census ===
As of the census of 2010, there were 770 people, 303 households, and 197 families living in the town. The population density was 726.4 inhabitants per square mile (280.5/km^{2}). There were 343 housing units at an average density of 323.6 per square mile (124.9/km^{2}). The racial makeup of the town was 97.0% White, 1.3% African American, 0.4% Native American, 0.4% Asian, and 0.9% from two or more races. Hispanic or Latino of any race were 1.7% of the population.

There were 303 households, of which 38.3% had children under the age of 18 living with them, 39.3% were married couples living together, 21.1% had a female householder with no husband present, 4.6% had a male householder with no wife present, and 35.0% were non-families. 29.7% of all households were made up of individuals, and 13.2% had someone living alone who was 65 years of age or older. The average household size was 2.54 and the average family size was 3.17.

The median age in the town was 32 years. 27.7% of residents were under the age of 18; 10.5% were between the ages of 18 and 24; 27.2% were from 25 to 44; 23.3% were from 45 to 64; and 11% were 65 years of age or older. The gender makeup of the town was 46.4% male and 53.6% female.

=== 2000 census ===
As of the census of 2000, there were 685 people, 270 households, and 186 families living in the town. The population density was 641.1 inhabitants per square mile (247.2/km^{2}). There were 325 housing units at an average density of 304.2 per square mile (117.3/km^{2}). The racial makeup of the town was 97.08% White, 1.17% African American, 0.15% Native American, 0.88% Asian, and 0.73% from two or more races. Hispanic or Latino of any race were 3.50% of the population.

There were 270 households, out of which 31.1% had children under the age of 18 living with them, 49.6% were married couples living together, 13.7% had a female householder with no husband present, and 31.1% were non-families. 25.9% of all households were made up of individuals, and 13.0% had someone living alone who was 65 years of age or older. The average household size was 2.54 and the average family size was 3.10.

In the town, the population was spread out, with 24.8% under the age of 18, 11.1% from 18 to 24, 28.2% from 25 to 44, 21.2% from 45 to 64, and 14.7% who were 65 years of age or older. The median age was 34 years. For every 100 females, there were 95.7 males. For every 100 females age 18 and over, there were 92.9 males.

The median income for a household in the town was $25,000, and the median income for a family was $26,705. Males had a median income of $22,500 versus $20,000 for females. The per capita income for the town was $10,948. About 23.0% of families and 27.1% of the population were below the poverty line, including 39.6% of those under age 18 and 5.9% of those age 65 or over.

== Notable people ==
- Ken Ash, baseball player who pitched in parts of four seasons in the major leagues
- Sam Fernandez, football player and coach for the Charleston Rockets.
