= Pleasant Creek Wildlife Management Area =

State Wildlife Management Area in West Virginia, US

- IUCN category IV (habitat/species management area)
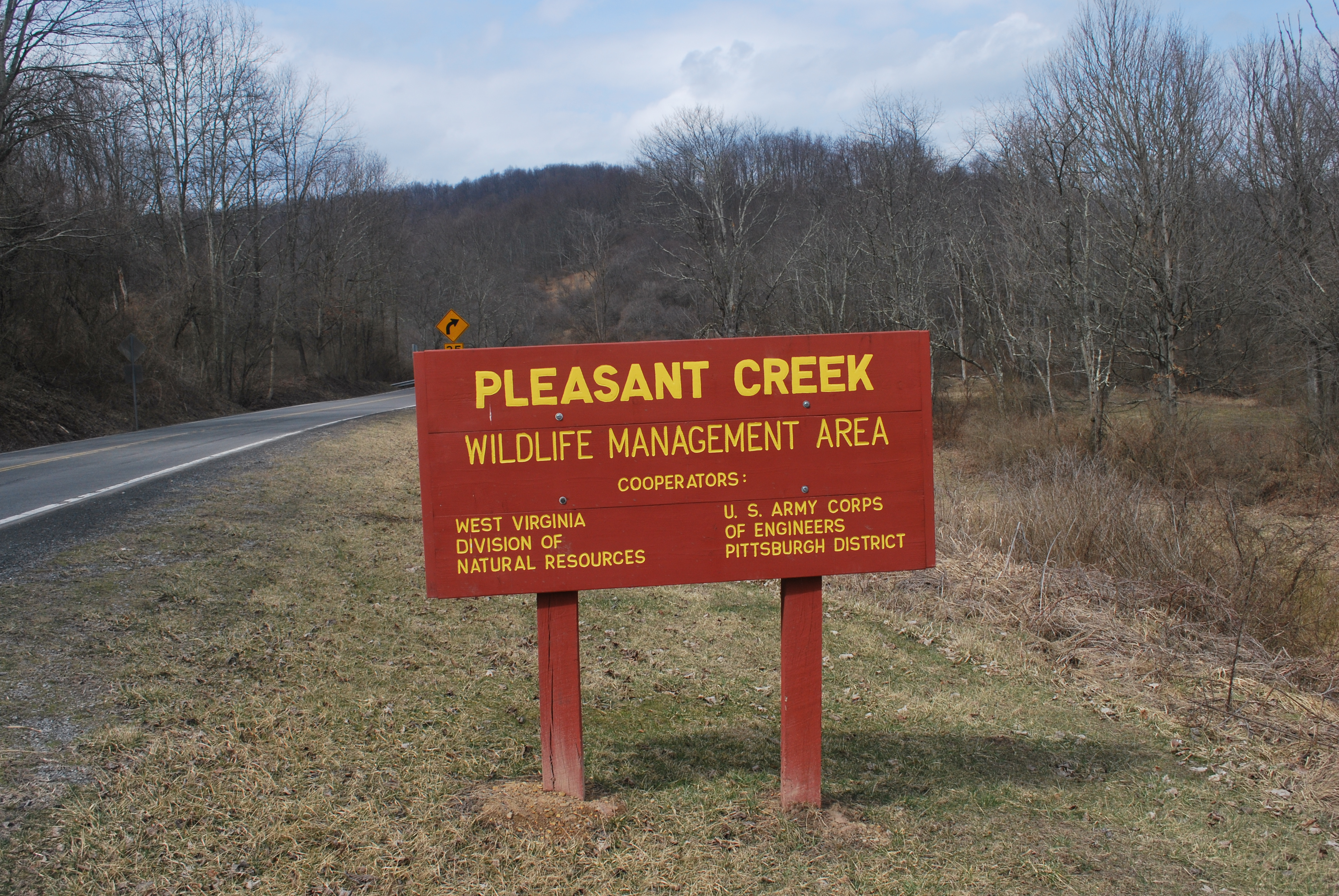
- Entrance sign for Pleasant Creek WMA

- Location within West Virginia
- Location: West Virginia, United States
- Coordinates: 39°15′41″N 80°03′30″W
- Area: 3,030 acres (12.3 km^{2})
- Elevation: 1,215 ft (370 m)
- Operator: Wildlife Resources Section, WV Division of Natural Resources

Pleasant Creek Wildlife Management Area is located near Philippi, West Virginia in Barbour and Taylor counties. Located on 3,030 acres (1,230 ha) land that varies from wetlands to steeply forested woodlands, the Pleasant Creek WMA rises to an elevation of 1,600 feet (490 m).

== Hunting and fishing ==
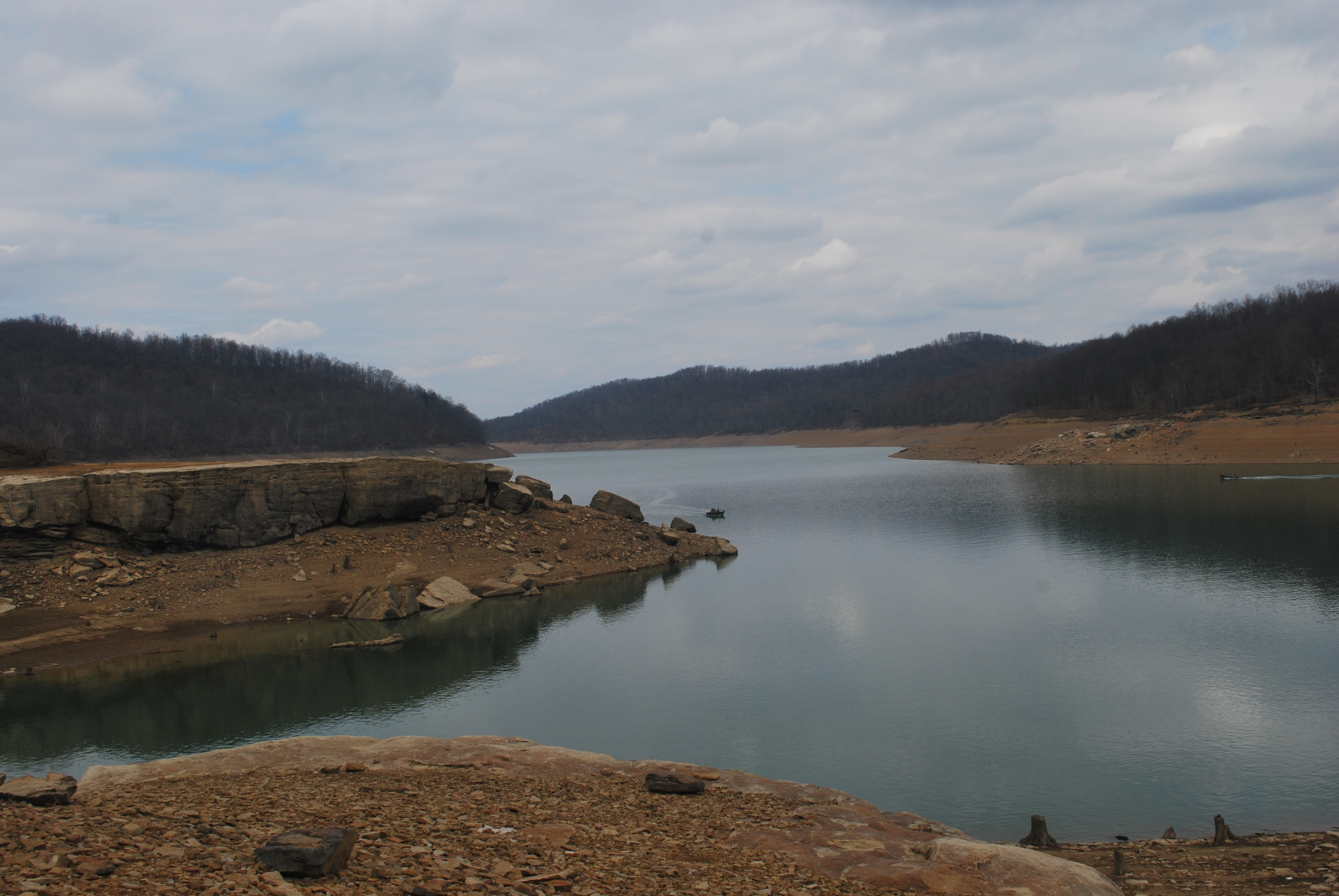
Tygart Lake in winter near WMA boat launch

Hunting opportunities in Pleasant Valley WMA include deer, bear, grouse, squirrel, rabbit, turkey and waterfowl.

Fishing in the 1,750-acre (710 ha) Tygart Lake includes largemouth bass, smallmouth bass, walleye, channel catfish, flathead catfish, crappie, bluegill, white bass, rock bass, bullhead, yellow perch, and carp. In addition, rainbow trout is stocked in the lake tailwaters.

Game fish in Pleasant Creek include rock bass, smallmouth bass, white bass, bluegill, channel catfish, flathead catfish, crappie, muskellunge, sunfish, and walleye.

A boat ramp is available at Tygart Lake. Doe Run Impoundment is limited to electric motors only. Forty (40) rustic camping sites for tents or trailers are available in the WMA.

== Shooting range ==
As of December 2011, the Pleasant Creek WMA has a 200-yard (180 m) shooting range with 8 covered benches. Shooters are responsible for bringing their own targets and target holders. The range is open year-round to anyone who wishes to use it and is open during all daylight hours Monday through Saturday as well as from 1PM until dusk on Sundays so as not to disturb local religious activities.

== See also ==
- Animal conservation
- List of West Virginia wildlife management areas
- Tygart Lake State Park
