= West Fork River =

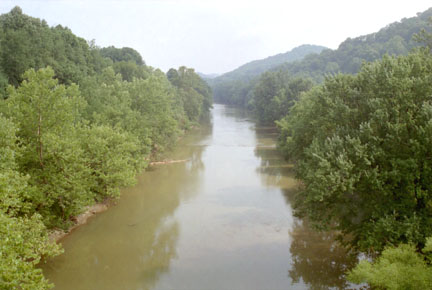
- The West Fork River in Enterprise, July 1996

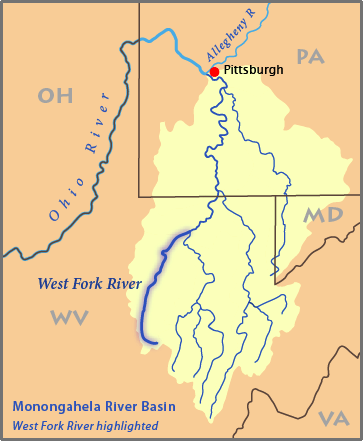
- Map of the Monongahela River basin, with the West Fork River highlighted

Location
- Country: United States
- State: West Virginia
- Counties: Upshur, Lewis, Harrison, Marion

Physical characteristics
- Source: Confluence of Straight Fork and Whites Camp Fork
  - location: near Rock Cave, Upshur County
  - coordinates: 38°51′08″N 80°21′32″W
  - elevation: 1,309 ft (399 m)
- Mouth: Monongahela River
  - location: Fairmont
  - coordinates: 39°27′53″N 80°09′11″W
  - elevation: 863 ft (263 m)
- Length: 103 mi (166 km)
- Basin size: 881 sq mi (2,280 km^{2})
- Discharge
  - location: mouth
  - average: 1,373.37 cu ft/s (38.890 m^{3}/s) (estimate)

The West Fork River is a principal tributary of the Monongahela River, 103 miles (166 km) long, in north-central West Virginia, United States. Via the Monongahela and Ohio Rivers, it is part of the watershed of the Mississippi River, draining an area of 881 square miles (2,284 km²) on the unglaciated portion of the Allegheny Plateau.

== Geography ==
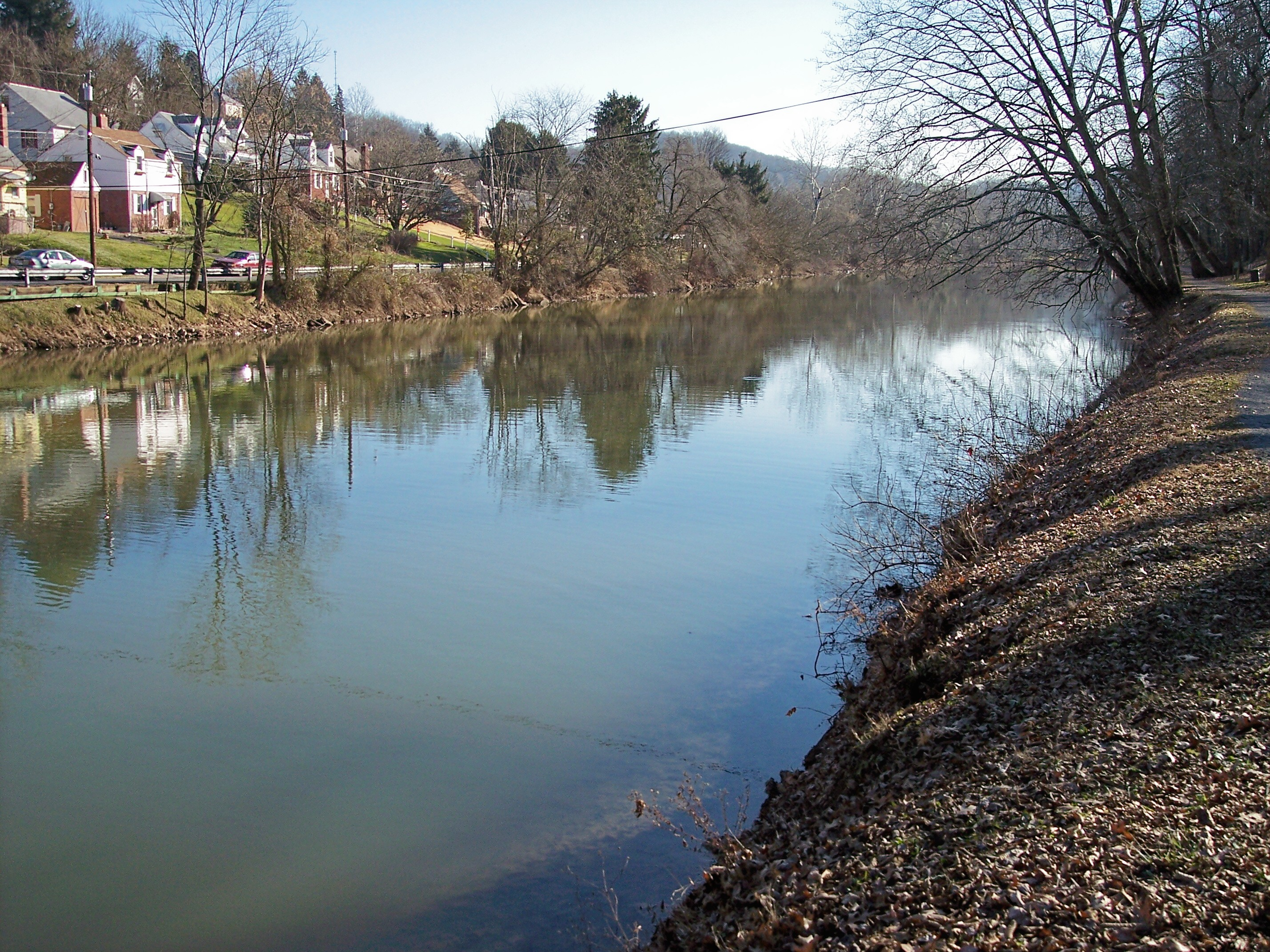
The West Fork River in Clarksburg, December 2006

The river is formed near the community of Rock Cave in southwestern Upshur County by the confluence of small headwaters tributaries known as Straight Fork and Whites Camp Fork. From this confluence the West Fork River flows north through Lewis, Harrison and Marion counties, through the communities of Weston, West Milford, Clarksburg, Lumberport, Shinnston, Enterprise, Worthington, and Monongah to Fairmont, where it joins the Tygart Valley River from the west to form the Monongahela River. (The Tygart is thus the "East Fork" of the Monongahela.) Among other tributaries, it collects Stonecoal Creek in Weston; Hackers Creek in southern Harrison County; Elk Creek in Clarksburg; Cap Run and Carrion Run in Lewis County and Simpson Creek and Tenmile Creek in northern Harrison County.

The West Fork has a low gradient and is slow-moving throughout its course. It is locally popular for fishing, and is stocked with muskellunge by the West Virginia Division of Natural Resources. Other fish species in the river include carp; channel and flathead catfish; golden and rainbow trout; largemouth, smallmouth, and spotted bass; sauger; and walleye.

Jackson's Mill was established along the river north of Weston around the year 1800 by Edward Jackson; his grandson and future confederate general Thomas "Stonewall" Jackson lived there during much of his youth. The site has been operated as a 4-H facility since the 1920s.

A walking trail parallels the river for 1.2 miles (2 km) in Veteran's Park in Clarksburg. For much of its length between Clarksburg and Fairmont, the West Fork is paralleled by a pair of rail trails on the route of a mid-19th century line of the Baltimore and Ohio Railroad. The Harrison County Trail extends northward from Clarksburg, and the West Fork River Trail connects Shinnston to Fairmont. A long-term closure of the connection between the two trails is anticipated, due to the presence of hazardous waste at an industrial site near the community of Spelter in northern Harrison County.

== Dams and navigation ==
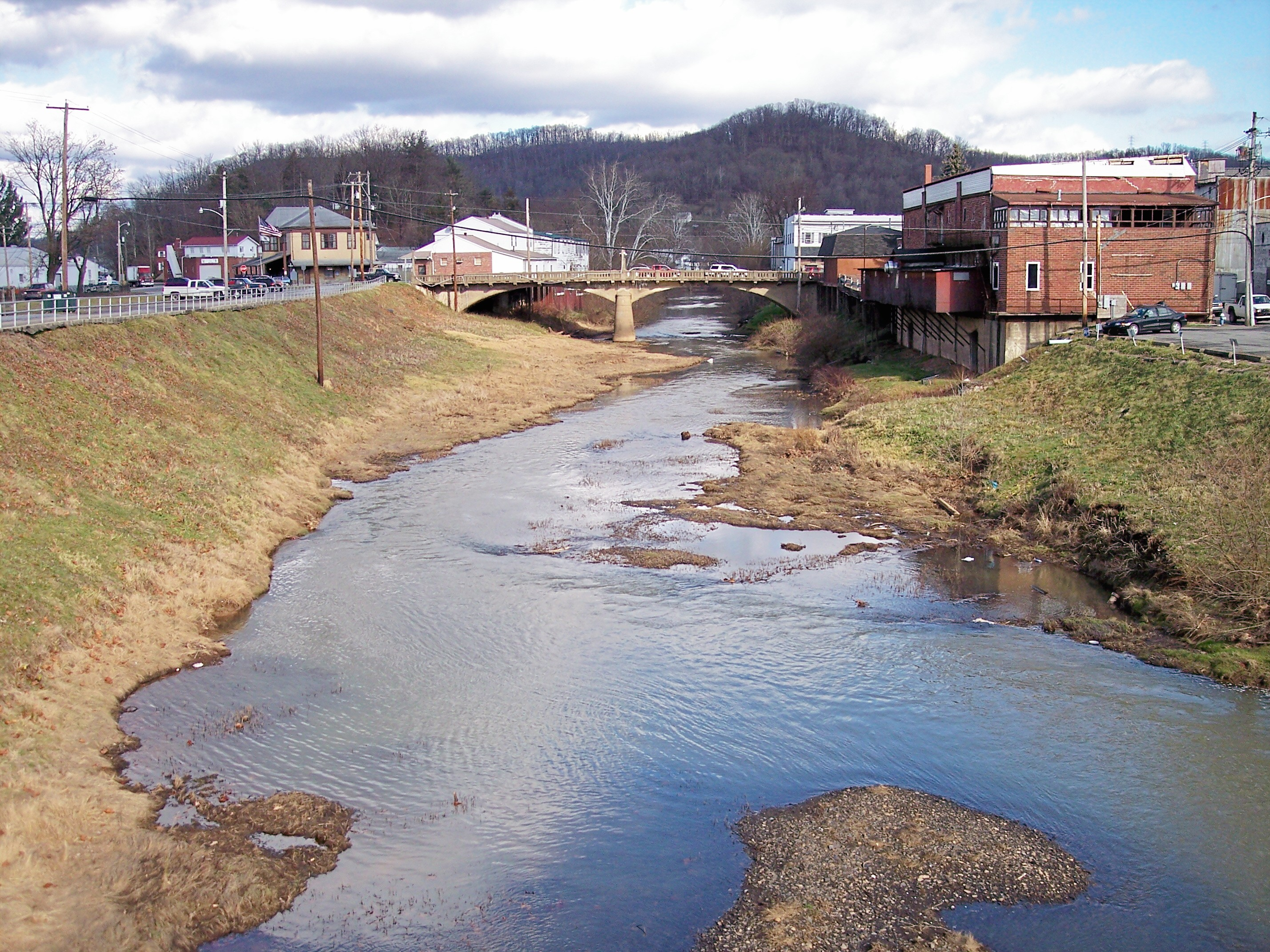
The West Fork River in Weston, December 2006

The West Fork River is not navigable by commercial barge traffic; it is classified by the West Virginia Division of Natural Resources as "recreationally navigable" for canoes and similar craft. During the early history of the United States, the government of Virginia attempted to maintain commercial navigability on the river, chartering a company for that purpose in 1793 and requiring that dams for milling operations provide a chute for boats to pass downstream. Construction of a system of locks, dams, and chutes was begun by the Monongahela Navigation Company in 1817; the project was abandoned following damage by floods in 1824.

Three miles (4.8 km) south of Weston, the river is dammed by the U.S. Army Corps of Engineers to form Stonewall Jackson Lake. The project was authorized by the federal Flood Control Act of 1966 for flood control, improvement of water quality and water supply, improvement of habitat for fish and wildlife, hydropower, and recreation. Construction of the dam was delayed by the opposition of local residents and began in the mid-1980s at an ultimate cost of $208 million; it became fully operational in 1988. The dam is 95 feet (29 m) tall and forms a 2,650-acre (1,070 ha) lake, with a larger capacity during periods of flood. Land along the lake is leased as a wildlife management area and Stonewall Jackson Lake State Park.

Between the years of 1905 and 1931, four small dams were constructed by the Clarksburg Water Board on a sixteen-mile (26 km) stretch of the river upstream (south) of Clarksburg, for the provision of local drinking water. While the dams in later years have come to be regarded as good fishing areas, the Water Board is working with the U.S. Fish and Wildlife Service on plans to remove them. In 2016 removal of three of the dams was completed in an effort led by U.S. Fish and Wildlife Service, the removed dams being: West Milford, Two Lick, and Highland Dams. Removal of the dams is claimed to have improved public safety, recreation access, water quality, and ecological connectivity.

== Variant names ==
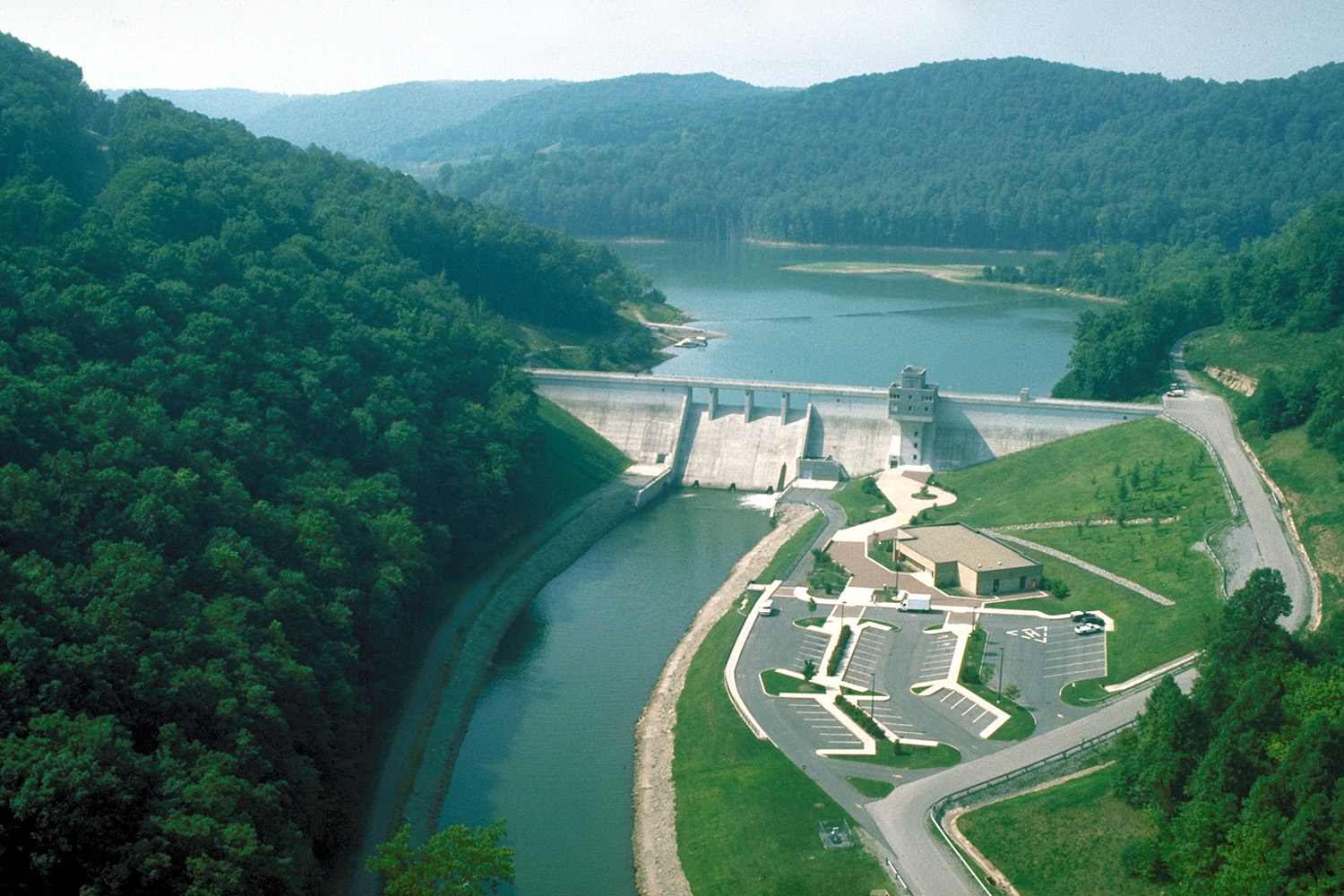
Stonewall Jackson Lake and Dam on the West Fork River near Weston, August 1993

The United States Board on Geographic Names settled on "West Fork River" as the stream's name in 1902. According to the Geographic Names Information System, the West Fork River has also been known historically as:

- Muddy River
- West Branch
- West Fork
- West Fork Monongahela River
- West Fork of Monongahela River
- West River

== See also ==
- List of rivers of West Virginia
- Walkersville Covered Bridge
- Elk Creek
- Clarksburg, West Virginia
