= Harrison County, West Virginia =

County in West Virginia, United States

- County
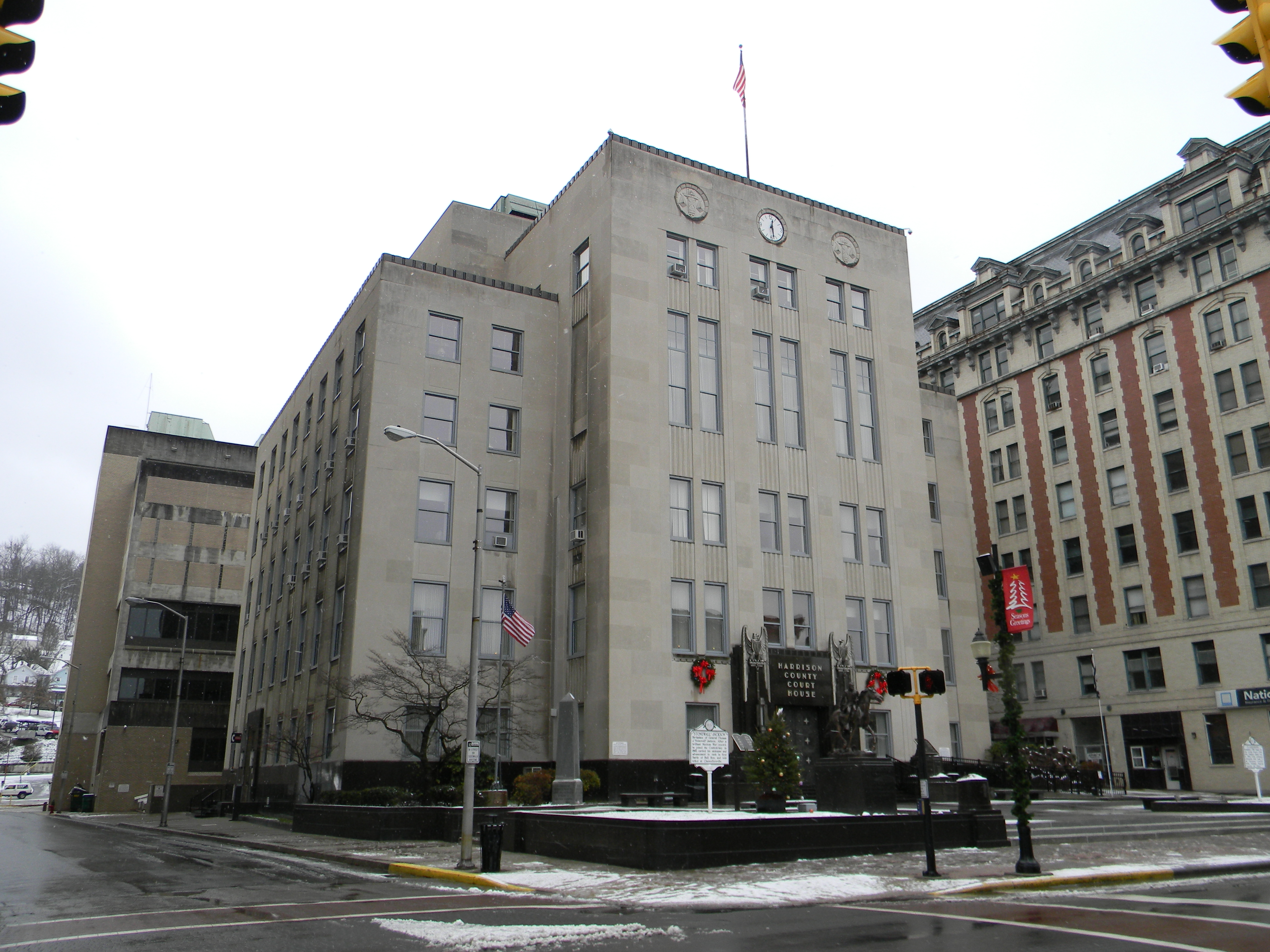
- Harrison County Courthouse

- Seal

- Location within the U.S. state of West Virginia
- Coordinates: 39°17′N 80°23′W
- Country: United States
- State: West Virginia
- Founded: May 3, 1784
- Named for: Benjamin Harrison V
- Seat: Clarksburg
- Largest city: Clarksburg

Area
  - Total: 417 sq mi (1,080 km^{2})
  - Land: 416 sq mi (1,080 km^{2})
  - Water: 0.5 sq mi (1.3 km^{2}) 0.1%

Population (2020)
  - Total: 65,921
  - Estimate (2025): 64,221 ▼
  - Density: 158/sq mi (61.2/km^{2})
- Time zone: UTC−5 (Eastern)
  - Summer (DST): UTC−4 (EDT)
- Congressional district: 1st
- Website: www.harrisoncountywv.com

Harrison County is a county in the U.S. state of West Virginia. As of the 2020 census, the population was 65,921, making it West Virginia's 7th most populous county. Its county seat is Clarksburg. Harrison County is part of the Clarksburg, WV Micropolitan Statistical Area.

== History ==
The land that is now Harrison Country has a long history. Indigenous peoples have lived in the area that would become Harrison County for thousands of years. In fact, the Oak Mounds outside of Clarksburg were built by the Hopewell culture mound builders during the first millennium CE.

=== 18th century ===
White trappers visited the area that is now Harrison County as early as the 1760s. Some traded with the Native Americans there. The Virginia Colony claimed the area as part of its vast Augusta County. The first permanent settler in the area was hunter and trapper John Simpson, who erected a cabin at the mouth of Elk Creek on the West Fork River in 1763 or '64. Simpson's name remains on "Simpson's Creek" (its mouth is about 9 miles downstream from present Clarksburg). Settler Daniel Davisson (1748–1819), from New Jersey, claimed the land upon which present-day Clarksburg, Harrison County, was formed in 1773; the area was re-designated as part of Monongalia County, Virginia three years later. Simpson's story did not end well. According to a 19th-century local historian, he ...

... continued to hunt and trap for a year without encountering any other human being. In 1765, he went to the South Branch to dispose of a stock of skins and furs, and returning to his camp, remained until permanent settlements were made in the vicinity. ... Simpson's cabin was located about one mile from Clarksburg, on the west side of the West Fork River ... Simpson became indebted to a man named Cottrial to the amount of "one quart of salt" (a precious article at the time), which he agreed to pay, either in money or salt, upon his return from Winchester, whither he was going to dispose of a stock of skins and furs. Upon his return, a dispute arose between them, regarding the payment, and Cottrial, in the heat of passion, hastened from the house, and grasping Daniel Davisson's gun, which stood leaning against the cabin, took aim through the space between the logs, and attempted to shoot Simpson. The latter, however, was too quick for him, and springing outside, grasped the gun from Cottrial's hands and killed him. This was the first tragedy of this nature in the vicinity.

Harrison County was organized in 1784 with territory partitioned from Monongalia County. It was named after Benjamin Harrison V, who had recently retired as the Governor of Virginia. He was the father of William Henry Harrison, the 9th President of the United States and great-grandfather of Benjamin Harrison, the 23rd President of the United States. Over the next 72 years, eight present-day West Virginia counties and parts of ten others were formed from this original Harrison County.

The first meeting of the Harrison County court was held on July 20, 1784, at the home of George Jackson. The group designated the county seat as Clarksburg. The town, named for explorer General George Rogers Clark (1752–1818), was chartered by the Virginia General Assembly in October 1785, and it was incorporated in 1795.

=== 19th century ===
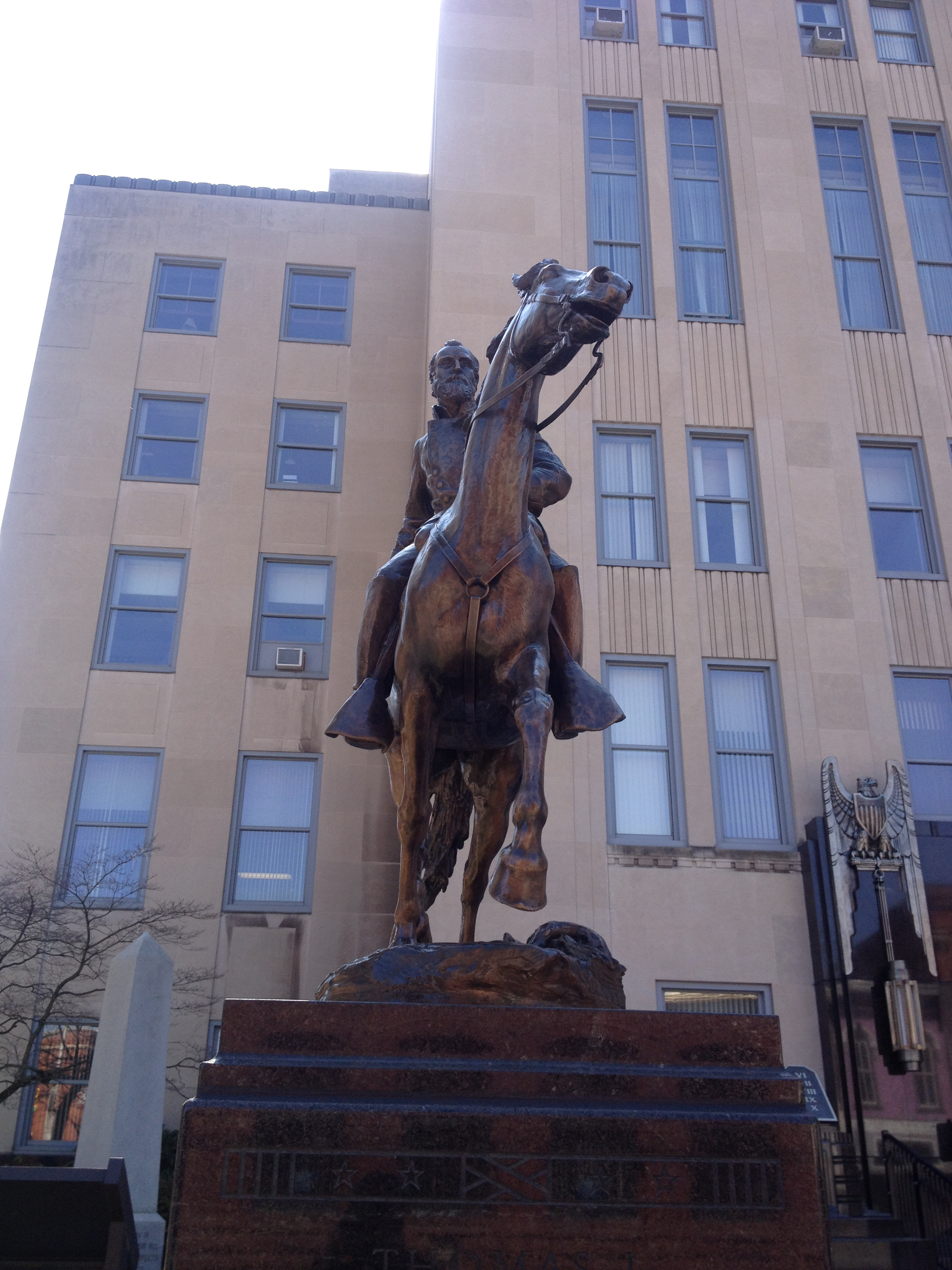
Statue of Civil War Confederate General Thomas J. "Stonewall" Jackson, in front of the Harrison County Courthouse

Clarksburg's first newspaper, The By-Stander, began publication in 1810. Construction of the Northwestern Turnpike, connecting Winchester and Parkersburg, reached the town in 1836, stimulating development by connecting it to other markets. Clarksburg's economic development was also helped by the arrival of the Baltimore and Ohio Railroad in 1856. The railroad was instrumental to the development of the local coal mining industry during the late 1800s and early 1900s.

In 1863, West Virginia's counties were divided into civil townships, with the intention of encouraging local government. This proved impractical in the heavily rural state, and in 1872 the townships were converted into magisterial districts. Harrison County was divided into ten districts: Clark, Clay, Coal, Eagle, Elk, Grant, Sardis, Simpson, Tenmile, (Note: Originally spelled "Ten-Mile", and later both "Tenmile" and "Ten Mile", before the present spelling stuck in the early 1900s.) and Union. These districts remained stable for a century, but in the 1970s they were consolidated to form six new districts: North Clarksburg, South Clarksburg, Suburban, Northern, Southeast, and Southwest. In the 1980s, North and South Clarksburg districts became North Urban and South Urban. In the 1990s, the Southeast and Suburban districts were discontinued, and replaced by the Eastern and Southern districts.

== Geography ==
The county terrain consists of low rolling hills, is largely wooded, and etched by drainages and creeks. The terrain slopes to the West Fork River valley from both the east and west borders, and also generally slopes to the north. Its highest point is on the south corner at 1,736 ft (529 m) ASL. The county has a total area of 417 square miles (1,080 km^{2}), of which 416 square miles (1,080 km^{2}) is land and 0.5 square miles (1.3 km^{2}) (0.1%) is water. The county is drained by the north-flowing West Fork River and its tributaries, including Tenmile Creek, Simpson Creek, and Elk Creek.

=== Major highways ===
- Interstate 79
- U.S. Route 19
- U.S. Route 50
- West Virginia Route 20
- West Virginia Route 23
- West Virginia Route 57
- West Virginia Route 58
- West Virginia Route 76
- West Virginia Route 98
- West Virginia Route 131
- West Virginia Route 270
- West Virginia Route 279

=== Airports ===
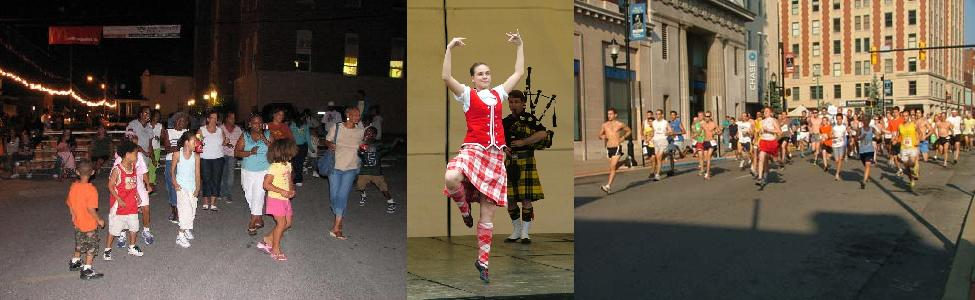
Left, the West Virginia Black Heritage Festival in Clarksburg, WV. Center, the Scottish Festival & Celtic Gathering in Bridgeport, WV. Right, the West Virginia Italian Heritage Festival in Clarksburg.

- North Central West Virginia Airport - northeast of Bridgeport
- Wade F. Maley Field - northeast of Shinnston

=== Adjacent counties ===
- Marion County - north
- Taylor County - east
- Barbour County - southeast
- Upshur County - south
- Lewis County - southwest
- Doddridge County - west
- Wetzel County - northwest

=== Protected areas ===
- Watters Smith State Park
- Center Branch Wildlife Management Area
- North Bend Rail Trail

=== Lakes ===
- Deegan Lake
- Lake Floyd
- Maple Lake
- Mine 95 Water Supply Reservoir
- Oral Lake
- Salem Auxiliary Lake

== Demographics ==
Historical population
Census	Pop.	Note	%±
1790	2,080		—
1800	4,848		133.1%
1810	9,958		105.4%
1820	10,932		9.8%
1830	14,722		34.7%
1840	17,669		20.0%
1850	11,728		−33.6%
1860	13,790		17.6%
1870	16,714		21.2%
1880	20,181		20.7%
1890	21,919		8.6%
1900	27,690		26.3%
1910	48,381		74.7%
1920	74,793		54.6%
1930	78,567		5.0%
1940	82,911		5.5%
1950	85,296		2.9%
1960	77,856		−8.7%
1970	73,028		−6.2%
1980	77,710		6.4%
1990	69,371		−10.7%
2000	68,652		−1.0%
2010	69,099		0.7%
2020	65,921		−4.6%
2025 (est.)	64,221	▼	−2.6%
US Decennial Census; 1790–1960 1900–1990; 1990–2000 2010–2020

=== 2020 census ===
As of the 2020 census, there were 65,921 people and 27,358 households residing in the county. Of the residents, 21.1% were under the age of 18 and 20.3% were 65 years of age or older; the median age was 43.0 years. For every 100 females there were 97.3 males, and for every 100 females age 18 and over there were 94.8 males.

Of the 27,358 households, 47.3% were married couples living together, 27.6% had a female householder with no spouse present, and 19.5% had a male householder with no spouse present. The average household and family size was 3.19 people.

There were 27,358 households, of which 27.7% had children under the age of 18 living with them and 27.3% had a female householder with no spouse or partner present. About 30.4% of all households were made up of individuals and 13.8% had someone living alone who was 65 years of age or older.

There were 30,480 housing units, of which 10.2% were vacant. Among occupied housing units, 72.9% were owner-occupied and 27.1% were renter-occupied. The homeowner vacancy rate was 1.8% and the rental vacancy rate was 9.9%.

The racial makeup of the county was 91.5% White, 1.7% Black or African American, 0.2% American Indian and Alaska Native, 0.7% Asian, 0.6% from some other race, and 5.2% from two or more races. Hispanic or Latino residents of any race comprised 2.1% of the population.

The median income for a household in the county was $51,553 and the poverty rate was 14.3%.

Harrison County, West Virginia – Racial and ethnic composition Note: the US Census treats Hispanic/Latino as an ethnic category. This table excludes Latinos from the racial categories and assigns them to a separate category. Hispanics/Latinos may be of any race.
Race / Ethnicity (NH = Non-Hispanic)	Pop 2000	Pop 2010	Pop 2020	% 2000	% 2010	% 2020
White alone (NH)	65,756	65,629	59,862	95.78%	94.97%	90.80%
Black or African American alone (NH)	1,102	1,111	1,104	1.60%	1.60%	1.67%
Native American or Alaska Native alone (NH)	100	127	135	0.14%	0.18%	0.20%
Asian alone (NH)	407	320	489	0.59%	0.46%	0.74%
Pacific Islander alone (NH)	16	15	28	0.02%	0.02%	0.04%
Other race alone (NH)	76	30	152	0.11%	0.04%	0.23%
Mixed race or Multiracial (NH)	535	984	2,748	0.77%	1.42%	4.16%
Hispanic or Latino (any race)	660	883	1,403	0.96%	1.27%	2.12%
Total	68,652	69,099	65,921	100.00%	100.00%	100.00%

=== 2010 census ===
As of the 2010 census, there were 69,099 people, 28,533 households, and 18,992 families in the county. The population density was 166 people per square mile (64 people/km^{2}). There were 31,431 housing units at an average density of 75.6 units per square mile (29.2 units/km^{2}). The racial makeup of the county was 96.0% white or Caucasian, 1.6% Black or African American, 0.5% Asian, 0.2% Native American, 0.2% from other races, and 1.5% from two or more races. Those of Hispanic or Latino origin made up 1.3% of the population. In terms of ancestry, 19.8% were German, 19.0% were American, 18.3% were Irish, 13.2% were English, and 10.4% were Italian.

Of the 28,533 households, 30.0% had children under the age of 18 living with them, 49.7% were married couples living together, 11.9% had a female householder with no husband present, 33.4% were non-families, and 28.3% of all households were made up of individuals. The average household size was 2.39 people and the average family size was 2.92 people. The median age was 41.8 years old.

The median income for a household in the county was $39,191 and the median income for a family was $46,882. Males had a median income of $42,615 versus $28,867 for females. The per capita income for the county was $21,010. About 15.0% of families and 18.9% of the population were below the poverty line, including 29.0% of those under age 18 and 9.1% of those age 65 or over.

=== 2000 census ===
As of the 2000 census, there were 68,652 people, 27,867 households, and 19,088 families in the county. The population density was 165 people per square mile (64 people/km^{2}). There were 31,112 housing units with an average density of 74.8 units per square mile (28.9 units/km^{2}). The racial makeup of the county was 96.55% white or Caucasian, 1.61% Black or African American, 0.15% Native American, 0.59% Asian, 0.03% Pacific Islander, 0.21% from other races, and 0.86% from two or more races. Hispanic or Latino individuals of any race made up 0.96% of the population.

There were 27,867 households, out of which 29.70% had children under the age of 18 living with them, 53.30% were living together, 11.40% had a female householder with no husband present, and 31.50% were non-families. Of all households, 27.70% were made up of individuals and 13.20% had someone living alone who was 65 years of age or older. The average household size was 2.42 people and the average family size was 2.94 people.

The county population contained 23.10% individuals under the age of 18, 8.30% from 18 to 24, 27.50% from 25 to 44, 24.50% from 45 to 64, and 16.60% who were 65 years of age or older. The median age was 39 years. For every 100 females, there were 91.80 males. For every 100 females age 18 and over, there were 88.20 males.

The median income for a household in the county was $30,562, and the median income for a family was $36,870. Males had a median income of $30,721 versus $22,110 for females. The per capita income for the county was $16,810. About 13.60% of families and 17.20% of the population were below the poverty line, including 24.10% of those under age 18 and 9.40% of those age 65 or over.

== Communities ==
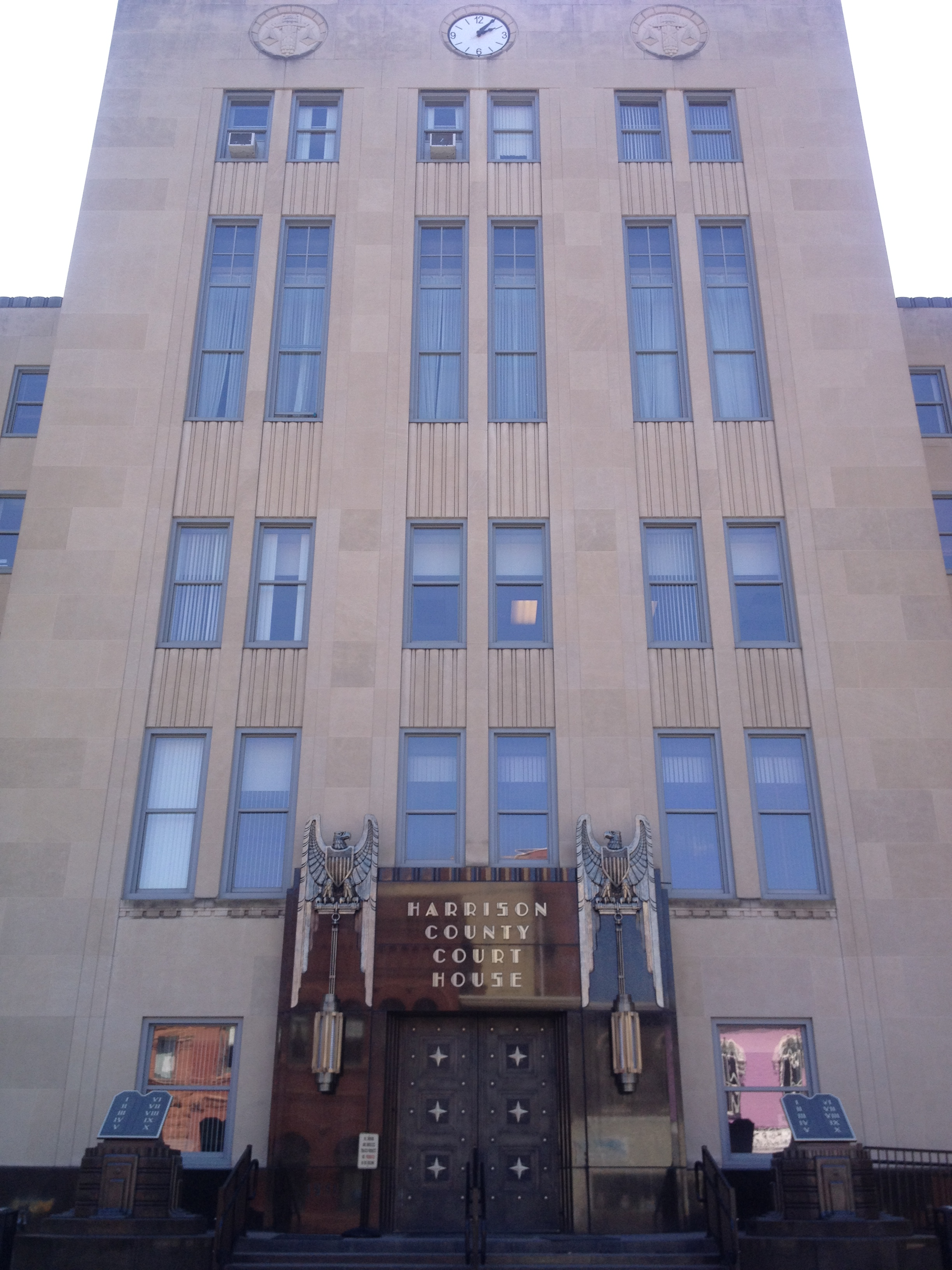
Harrison County Courthouse

=== Cities ===
- Bridgeport
- Clarksburg (county seat)
- Salem
- Shinnston
- Stonewood

=== Towns ===
- Anmoore
- Lost Creek
- Lumberport
- Nutter Fort
- West Milford

=== Magisterial Districts ===
- Eastern
- Northern
- North Urban
- Southern
- South Urban
- Southwest

=== Census-designated places ===
- Despard
- East View
- Enterprise
- Gypsy
- Hepzibah
- Reynoldsville
- Spelter
- Wallace
- Wolf Summit

=== Charles Pointe Master-Planned Community ===
Harrison County is the site of a master-planned community, Charles Pointe, which is currently under construction in the city of Bridgeport and comprises 1,700 acres (6.9 km^{2}) that will combine commercial, residential, and recreational areas into one master-planned community. Adjacent to Charles Pointe, the United Hospital Center, a $278 million state-of-the-art medical facility. Across from the United Hospital Center site, White Oaks, a planned business community is also under construction, and will support the hospital and the FBI CJIS complex, which is also located near the White Oaks site. This area of West Virginia's Interstate 79 is considered part of a "High Tech Corridor."

== Politics ==
During the 20th century, Harrison County voters leaned Democratic. However, since 2000 the county has selected the Republican Party candidate in every national election (as of 2020).

United States presidential election results for Harrison County, West Virginia
Year	Republican		Democratic		Third party(ies)	
Year	No.	%	No.	%	No.	%
1912	1,754	16.47%	4,378	41.10%	4,520	42.43%
1916	6,262	48.86%	5,970	46.58%	584	4.56%
1920	13,784	55.67%	10,206	41.22%	769	3.11%
1924	15,165	49.38%	13,470	43.86%	2,075	6.76%
1928	17,502	57.70%	12,483	41.16%	346	1.14%
1932	14,641	43.90%	18,081	54.21%	632	1.89%
1936	14,180	36.66%	24,361	62.98%	137	0.35%
1940	17,087	43.09%	22,570	56.91%	0	0.00%
1944	14,408	44.42%	18,028	55.58%	0	0.00%
1948	14,534	40.65%	21,109	59.03%	114	0.32%
1952	21,193	50.80%	20,527	49.20%	0	0.00%
1956	21,860	55.48%	17,541	44.52%	0	0.00%
1960	18,378	47.00%	20,727	53.00%	0	0.00%
1964	9,986	28.00%	25,683	72.00%	0	0.00%
1968	13,703	39.37%	18,872	54.22%	2,234	6.42%
1972	22,196	63.23%	12,910	36.77%	0	0.00%
1976	15,172	41.41%	21,467	58.59%	0	0.00%
1980	14,251	41.19%	18,813	54.37%	1,538	4.44%
1984	19,400	56.33%	14,969	43.47%	68	0.20%
1988	13,364	43.93%	17,005	55.90%	49	0.16%
1992	9,687	31.93%	15,480	51.02%	5,174	17.05%
1996	8,857	33.00%	14,746	54.93%	3,240	12.07%
2000	12,948	48.72%	13,009	48.95%	621	2.34%
2004	17,111	55.94%	13,238	43.28%	239	0.78%
2008	17,824	55.56%	13,582	42.34%	672	2.09%
2012	15,876	60.43%	9,732	37.04%	663	2.52%
2016	18,750	66.14%	7,694	27.14%	1,907	6.73%
2020	20,683	67.89%	9,215	30.25%	567	1.86%
2024	20,480	69.44%	8,402	28.49%	613	2.08%

== Historical landmarks ==
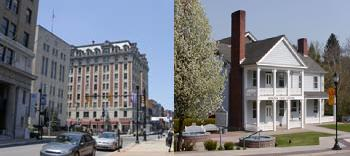
Views of Main Street in Clarksburg (left) and the Benedum Civic Center in Bridgeport (right). Clarksburg and Bridgeport are the largest cities in Harrison County.

- Fletcher Covered Bridge
- Kelly Miller High School
- Oak Mounds
- Simpson Creek Covered Bridge
- The Waldomore

== Notable people ==
- John S. Carlile, Unionist Virginia Senator, 1861 to 1865.
- John W. Davis, Democratic Party candidate for President in 1924
- Guy Goff, Republican Party United States Senator
- Joseph Johnson, 32nd Governor of the Commonwealth of Virginia, 1852 to 1856.
- Harry Powers, lonely hearts serial killer hanged in 1932. Basis for The Night of the Hunter by Davis Grubb.
- Jennings Randolph, U.S. Representative from 1933 to 1947 and U.S. Senator from 1958 to 1985.
- Cyrus Vance, U.S. Secretary of State under President Carter, Deputy Secretary of Defense under President Johnson, and Secretary of the Army under President Kennedy.

== See also ==
- Harrison County Schools
- Center Branch Wildlife Management Area
- Central West Virginia Transportation Authority
- North Bend Rail Trail
- Watters Smith Memorial State Park
- National Register of Historic Places listings in Harrison County, West Virginia
