= List of state routes in West Virginia =

- Sample highway shields

Highway names
- Interstates: Interstate XX (I-XX)
- US Highways: U.S. Route XX (US XX)
- State: West Virginia Route XX (WV XX)
- County Routes: County Route XX (CR XX)

System links
- West Virginia State Highway System; Interstate; US; State

State highways in the U.S. state of West Virginia are owned and maintained by the West Virginia Division of Highways.

== State routes ==
| Number | Length (mi) | Length (km) | Southern or western terminus | Northern or eastern terminus | Formed | Removed | Notes |
|---|---|---|---|---|---|---|---|
| WV 1 | — | — | — | — | 1922 | 1927 | |
| WV 2 | 230.6 | 371.1 | US 60 in Huntington | US 30 in Chester | 1922 | current | |
| WV 3 | — | — | — | — | 1922 | 1927 | |
| WV 3 | 186 | 299 | WV 10 in West Hamlin | WV 311 in Sweet Springs | 1931 | current | |
| WV 4 | — | — | — | — | 1922 | 1927 | |
| WV 4 | 96.6 | 155.5 | US 119 in Clendenin | WV 20 in Rock Cave | 1937 | current | |
| WV 5 | — | — | — | — | 1922 | 1937 | |
| WV 5 | 71.6 | 115.2 | WV 14 in Elizabeth | US 19/WV 4 in Heaters | 1938 | current | |
| WV 6 | — | — | — | — | 1922 | 1928 | |
| WV 6 | 0.6 | 0.97 | WV 61 in Montgomery | US 60 in Smithers | 1956 | current | Unsigned route |
| WV 7 | 102.5 | 165.0 | SR 536 at the Ohio state line, west end of New Martinsville Bridge in New Martinsville | MD 39 at the Maryland state line east of Corinth | 1922 | current | |
| WV 8 | — | — | — | — | 1922 | 1932 | |
| WV 8 | 8.3 | 13.4 | WV 2 in New Cumberland | US 30 east of Chester | 1968 | current | |
| WV 9 | 74.0 | 119.1 | MD 51 at Maryland state line in Paw Paw | SR 9 at Virginia state line state line near Keyes Gap | 1922 | current | |
| WV 10 | 148.5 | 239.0 | US 19 in Kegley | US 60 in Huntington | 1922 | current | |
| WV 11 | — | — | — | — | 1922 | 1931 | |
| WV 12 | — | — | — | — | 1922 | 1940 | Became part of WV 16 to match Virginia (which had renumbered its side from SR 27 to SR 16) |
| WV 12 | 48.6 | 78.2 | Peterstown | Alta | 1941 | current | |
| WV 13 | — | — | Charleston | Yawkey | 1922 | 1946 | Became part of WV 14; now WV 214 |
| WV 14 | 59.0 | 95.0 | Spencer | Williamstown | 1922 | current | |
| WV 15 | 64.1 | 103.2 | North of Sutton | Valley Head | 1922 | current | |
| WV 16 | 252.9 | 407.0 | Virginia state line | St. Marys | 1922 | current | |
| WV 17 | — | — | — | — | 1922 | 1970 | |
| WV 17 | 30.4 | 48.9 | Stollings | Madison | 1976 | current | |
| WV 18 | 57.4 | 92.4 | Troy | Sistersville | 1922 | current | |
| WV 19 | — | — | — | — | 1922 | 1931 | |
| WV 20 | 256.2 | 412.3 | — | — | 1922 | 1931 | |
| WV 20 | 256.2 | 412.3 | US 52 in Bluewell | WV 7 east of New Martinsville | 1931 | current | Extended in 1941 to include the 1922 route |
| WV 21 | — | — | — | — | 1922 | 1931 | |
| WV 22 | — | — | — | — | 1922 | 1931 | |
| WV 23 | — | — | — | — | 1922 | 1940 | Renumbered WV 259 and WV 55 to match Virginia |
| WV 23 | 27.0 | 43.5 | Tyler | Salem | 1940 | current | |
| WV 24 | — | — | — | — | 1922 | 1935 | |
| WV 24 | 5.6 | 9.0 | Silver Lake | Eglon | 1935 | current | |
| WV 25 | — | — | — | — | 1922 | 1927 | |
| WV 25 | — | — | — | — | 1931 | 1935 | |
| WV 25 | 12.47 | 20.07 | South of Poca | Charleston | 1935 | current | |
| WV 26 | 41.3 | 66.5 | US 50 in Fellowsville | PA 281 at the Pennsylvania state line northeast of Glade Farms | 1922 | current | |
| WV 27 | 5.8 | 9.3 | WV 2 in Wellsburg | PA 844 at Pennsylvania state line 5.6 miles (9.0 km) east of Wellsburg | 1922 | current | |
| WV 28 | 150.8 | 242.7 | Huntersville | Maryland state line | 1922 | current | |
| WV 29 | — | — | — | — | 1922 | 1927 | |
| WV 29 | 69.3 | 111.5 | Baker | South of Paw Paw | 1928 | current | |
| WV 30 | — | — | — | — | 1922 | 1927 | |
| WV 31 | — | — | — | — | 1922 | 1927 | |
| WV 31 | 36.7 | 59.1 | Harrisville | SR 60 in Marietta, Ohio | 1934 | current | |
| WV 32 | — | — | — | — | 1922 | 1927 | |
| WV 32 | 21.8 | 35.1 | Harman | Thomas | 1931 | current | |
| WV 33 | — | — | — | — | 1922 | 1937 | |
| WV 34 | 51 | 82 | East of Hamlin | Kenna | 1922 | current | |
| WV 35 | — | — | — | — | 1922 | 1938 | |
| WV 36 | 36.2 | 58.3 | Maysel | Spencer | 1922 | current | |
| WV 37 | 39.4 | 63.4 | KY 3 Spur at the Kentucky state line | Ranger | 1922 | current | |
| WV 38 | — | — | — | — | 1922 | 1931 | |
| WV 38 | — | — | — | — | 1931 | 1940 | Renumbered WV 522 to match Virginia; later US 522 |
| WV 38 | 20 | 32 | US 250 near Philippi | WV 72 near St. George | 1957 | current | |
| WV 39 | 106.2 | 170.9 | US 60/WV 16 in Gauley Bridge | SR 39 at the Virginia state line at Rimel | 1922 | current | |
| WV 40 | — | — | — | — | 1922 | 1931 | |
| WV 41 | 64.8 | 104.3 | Beckley | Calvin | 1922 | current | |
| WV 42 | 40.7 | 65.5 | West of Petersburg | Maryland state line | 1922 | current | |
| WV 43 | — | — | — | — | 1922 | 1940 | Became part of WV 39 to match Virginia (which had renumbered its side from SR 501 to SR 39); the original plan was to renumber this road as WV 501, but West Virginia could not do that |
| WV 43 | — | — | US 19 at Muddlety | WV 20 at Craigsville | 1941 | 1980 | Renumbered as WV 150 in 1980, and then as WV 55 by 1983 |
| WV 43 | 4.2 | 6.8 | I-68 at Cheat Lake | PA 43 at Pennsylvania state line 1.5 miles (2.4 km) north of Cheat Lake | 2011 | current | |
| WV 44 | — | — | — | — | 1922 | 1931 | |
| WV 44 | — | — | — | — | 1931 | 1941 | |
| WV 44 | — | — | — | — | 1956 | 1977 | |
| WV 44 | 16.8 | 27.0 | Mountain View | Logan | 1977 | current | |
| WV 45 | — | — | — | — | 1922 | 1932 | |
| WV 45 | 25.8 | 41.5 | Virginia state line | Shepherdstown | 1932 | current | |
| WV 46 | 32 | 51 | Elk Garden Maryland state line | Maryland state line Fort Ashby | 1922 | current | |
| WV 47 | — | — | — | — | 1922 | 1928 | |
| WV 47 | 62.5 | 100.6 | Parkersburg | Linn | 1928 | current | |
| WV 48 | — | — | — | — | 1922 | 1977 | |
| WV 49 | — | — | — | — | 1922 | 1931 | |
| WV 49 | 18.9 | 30.4 | Kentucky state line | East of Williamson | 1935 | current | |
| WV 50 | — | — | — | — | 1922 | 1927 | |
| WV 51 | — | — | — | — | 1922 | 1931 | |
| WV 51 | — | — | — | — | 1931 | 1931 | Appeared alongside the current one |
| WV 51 | 18.2 | 29.3 | East of Glengary | Charles Town | 1932 | current | |
| WV 52 | — | — | — | — | 1922 | 1927 | |
| WV 53 | — | — | — | — | 1922 | 1931 | |
| WV 53 | 9.8 | 15.8 | East of Elizabeth | West of Macfarlan | 1931 | current | |
| WV 54 | — | — | — | — | 1922 | 1931 | |
| WV 54 | — | — | — | — | 1931 | 1946 | |
| WV 54 | 18.6 | 29.9 | Mullens | Sophia | 1957 | current | |
| WV 55 | — | — | — | — | 1922 | 1927 | |
| WV 55 | — | — | — | — | 1928 | 1931 | |
| WV 55 | — | — | — | — | 1933 | 1940 | Renumbered WV 23 in a numbering swap so that new WV 55 matched Virginia |
| WV 55 | 227.5 | 366.1 | Muddlety | Virginia state line | 1940 | current | |
| WV 56 | — | — | — | — | 1922 | 1935 | |
| WV 56 | — | — | — | — | 1937 | 1977 | |
| WV 57 | 11.8 | 19.0 | East of Clarksburg | South of Philippi | 1922 | current | |
| WV 58 | — | — | — | — | 1922 | 1928 | |
| WV 58 | — | — | — | — | 1928 | 1940 | Renumbered WV 259 to match Virginia (which had renumbered its side from SR 275) |
| WV 58 | 6 | 9.7 | Stonewood | Bridgeport | 1957 | current | |
| WV 59 | — | — | — | — | 1922 | 1926 | |
| WV 59 | 7.7 | 12.4 | WV 259 in Lost City | SR 691 at the Virginia state line | 1929 | 2018 | |
| WV 60 | — | — | — | — | 1922 | 1926 | |
| WV 60 | — | — | — | — | 1928 | 1931 | |
| WV 61 | 63.3 | 101.9 | Piney View | Charleston | 1922 | current | |
| WV 62 | 100.83 | 162.27 | Charleston | Ripley | 1922 | current | |
| WV 63 | — | — | — | — | 1922 | 1931 | |
| WV 63 | 21.5 | 34.6 | Alderson | Caldwell | 1933 | current | |
| WV 64 | — | — | — | — | 1922 | 1932 | |
| WV 64 | — | — | — | — | 1938 | 1961 | |
| WV 65 | — | — | — | — | 1922 | 1931 | |
| WV 65 | 23.8 | 38.3 | Matewan | Naugatuck | 1933 | current | |
| WV 66 | — | — | — | — | 1922 | 1931 | |
| WV 66 | — | — | — | — | 1932 | 1970 | |
| WV 66 | 16.1 | 25.9 | East of Slatyfork | South of Green Bank | 1990 | current | |
| WV 67 | — | — | — | — | 1922 | 1931 | |
| WV 67 | 9.7 | 15.6 | WV 2 along the edge of Wellsburg | PA 331 at Pennsylvania state line southeast of Bethany | 1933 | current | |
| WV 68 | — | — | — | — | 1922 | 1931 | |
| WV 68 | — | — | — | — | 1932 | 1948 | |
| WV 68 | — | — | — | — | 1961 | 1978 | |
| WV 68 | 34.9 | 56.2 | Ravenswood | East of Parkersburg | 1978 | current | |
| WV 69 | — | — | — | — | 1923 | 1933 | |
| WV 69 | 3.5 | 5.6 | US 250 in Hundred | PA 18 at Pennsylvania state line in Burton | 1961 | current | Renumbered from WV 70 |
| WV 70 | — | — | US 250 in Hundred | PA 18 at Pennsylvania state line in Burton | 1923 | 1961 | Renumbered as WV 69 |
| WV 71 | — | — | — | — | 1923 | 1931 | |
| WV 71 | 11.3 | 18.2 | Bluewell | Matoaka | 1935 | current | |
| WV 72 | 55.7 | 89.6 | North of Dryfork | Kingwood | 1923 | current | |
| WV 73 | — | — | US 50 in Bridgeport | WV 26 in Bruceton Mills | 1924 | 1977 | |
| WV 73 | 2.4 | 3.9 | US 119 in Verdunville | WV 10 in Logan | 1996 | current | |
| WV 74 | 36.2 | 58.3 | Coxs Mills | Josephs Mills | 1924 | current | |
| WV 75 | 12.1 | 19.5 | Kenova | Lavalette | 1924 | current | |
| WV 76 | — | — | — | — | 1924 | 1931 | |
| WV 76 | 16 | 26 | East of Bridgeport | North of Philippi | 1961 | current | |
| WV 77 | — | — | — | — | 1924 | 1961 | |
| WV 78 | — | — | — | — | 1925 | 1932 | |
| WV 78 | — | — | — | — | 1957 | 1965 | |
| WV 79 | — | — | — | — | 1925 | 1927 | |
| WV 79 | — | — | — | — | 1933 | 1961 | |
| WV 80 | — | — | — | — | 1925 | 1927 | |
| WV 80 | 41.1 | 66.1 | Bradshaw | Huff Junction | 1941 | current | |
| WV 81 | — | — | — | — | 1925 | 1940 | Renumbered WV 311 to match Virginia |
| WV 81 | — | — | — | — | 1960 | 1961 | |
| WV 82 | — | — | — | — | 1928 | 1947 | |
| WV 82 | — | — | US 19 in Fayetteville | US 60 in Lookout | 1947 | 1983 | Downgraded to Fayette County Route 82 |
| WV 82 | 16.8 | 27.0 | Birch River | Cowen | 1990 | current | |
| WV 83 | 17.7 | 28.5 | Virginia state line | Yukon | 1928 | current | |
| WV 84 | 4.6 | 7.4 | Frost | Virginia state line | 1928 | current | |
| WV 85 | — | — | — | — | 1928 | 1931 | |
| WV 85 | — | — | — | — | 1935 | 1947 | |
| WV 85 | — | — | — | — | 1947 | 1959 | |
| WV 85 | 45.1 | 72.6 | Oceana | Danville | 1961 | current | |
| WV 86 | — | — | — | — | 1928 | 1931 | |
| WV 86 | 5.9 | 9.5 | US 250/WV 2 in Glen Dale | WV 88 in Sherrard | 1957 | current | |
| WV 87 | — | — | — | — | 1928 | 1931 | |
| WV 87 | — | — | — | — | 1933 | 1937 | |
| WV 87 | 13 | 21 | West of Mount Alto | West of Ripley | 1937 | current | |
| WV 88 | 32.2 | 51.8 | US 250 in Limestone | WV 27 east of Wellsburg | 1928 | current | |
| WV 89 | — | — | — | — | 1928 | 1993 | |
| WV 90 | 12.9 | 20.8 | Thomas | Gormania | 1930 | current | |
| WV 91 | — | — | — | — | 1930 | 1985 | |
| WV 92 | 162.3 | 261.2 | White Sulphur Springs | Reedsville | 1930 | current | |
| WV 93 | — | — | — | — | 1930 | 1931 | |
| WV 93 | 37.8 | 60.8 | Davis | West of New Creek | 1957 | current | |
| WV 94 | — | — | — | — | 1930 | 1941 | |
| WV 94 | — | — | — | — | 1941 | 1956 | |
| WV 94 | — | — | — | — | 1968 | 1980 | |
| WV 94 | 10 | 16 | Racine | Marmet | 1982 | current | |
| WV 95 | 6.2 | 10.0 | Parkersburg | Parkersburg | 1961 | current | |
| WV 97 | 48.9 | 78.7 | Hanover | Mabscott | 1971 | current | |
| WV 98 | 6.1 | 9.8 | Clarksburg | Nutter Fort | 1978 | current | |
| WV 99 | 13.8 | 22.2 | North of Kopperston | Glen Daniel | 1967 | current | |
| WV 100 | 9.5 | 15.3 | US 19 in Westover | US 19 northwest of Maidsville | 1957 | current | |
| WV 101 | 0.98 | 1.58 | Huntington | Huntington | 1993 | current | Unsigned route |
| WV 102 | 3.2 | 5.1 | Virginia state line | Virginia state line | 1959 | current | |
| WV 103 | 11.1 | 17.9 | Black Wolf | Welch | 1978 | current | |
| WV 104 | 1.2 | 1.9 | Princeton | Princeton | 1978 | current | |
| WV 105 | 4.7 | 7.6 | WV 2 in Weirton | US 22 in Weirton | 1978 | current | |
| WV 106 | 0.7 | 1.1 | Huntington | Huntington | 1980 | current | |
| WV 107 | 1.8 | 2.9 | Hinton | Hinton | 1981 | current | |
| WV 108 | — | — | US 52/US 460 in Bluefield | WV 123 in Bluefield | 2023 | current | In construction |
| WV 112 | 14 | 23 | Bluefield | Oakvale | — | — | |
| WV 114 | 7.94 | 12.78 | Charleston | Big Chimney | — | — | |
| WV 115 | 19.2 | 30.9 | Charles Town | Ranson | — | — | |
| WV 120 | — | — | Bramwell | Virginia state line | proposed | — | Proposed upgrade of CR 120 |
| WV 121 | 13.2 | 21.2 | Slab Fork | North of Sophia | — | — | Future US 121, will be decommissioned when more of US 121 is completed |
| WV 122 | 13.2 | 21.2 | Forest Hill | North of Rock Camp | — | — | |
| WV 123 | 9.9 | 15.9 | Virginia state line | West of Princeton | — | — | |
| WV 125 | 10 | 16 | Hinton | Sandstone | — | — | Partially built New River Parkway, unsigned as of 2016 |
| WV 127 | 7.6 | 12.2 | Forks of Cacapon | Virginia state line | — | — | |
| WV 129 | 11.9 | 19.2 | Drennen | Mount Nebo | — | — | |
| WV 131 | 10.9 | 17.5 | Shinnston | Bridgeport | — | — | |
| WV 150 | 22.5 | 36.2 | West of Mill Point | North of Edray | — | — | |
| WV 152 | 44.8 | 72.1 | North of Crum | Huntington | — | — | |
| WV 154 | — | — | Crumpler | Ghent | proposed | — | Proposed Shawnee Parkway |
| WV 161 | 20.6 | 33.2 | Bishop | Elkhorn | — | — | |
| WV 180 | 7.39 | 11.89 | North of Middlebourne | South of New Martinsville | — | — | |
| WV 193 | 3.6 | 5.8 | Barboursville | Lesage | — | — | |
| WV 208 | — | — | WV 2 | WV 8 near US 30 | proposed | — | Proposed upgrade of the relatively new CR 208 |
| WV 210 | 2.9 | 4.7 | Beckley | Beckley | — | — | |
| WV 211 | 1.4 | 2.3 | Mount Hope | Mount Hope | — | — | |
| WV 214 | 22 | 35 | Yawkey | Ruth | — | — | |
| WV 218 | 22.8 | 36.7 | Worthington | Pennsylvania state line | — | — | |
| WV 230 | 9.2 | 14.8 | Halltown | Shepherdstown | — | — | |
| WV 243 | — | — | Arden | US 11 at Tablers Station | 2024 | current | |
| WV 251 | — | — | Wheeling | Wheeling | — | — | |
| WV 252 | — | — | Wheeling | Wheeling | — | — | Route may no longer exist as Aetnaville Bridge is closed. |
| WV 259 | 45.6 | 73.4 | Virginia state line | Virginia state line | — | — | |
| WV 270 | 5.9 | 9.5 | West Milford | Lost Creek | — | — | Formerly CR 27 |
| WV 273 | 1.3 | 2.1 | Pleasant Valley | Fairmont | — | — | Route fully opened on December 22, 2010 |
| WV 279 | 3.5 | 5.6 | Clarksburg | Bridgeport | — | — | |
| WV 290 | — | — | — | — | 1976 | 1981 | |
| WV 305 | 3 | 4.8 | Lester | Surveyor | — | — | |
| WV 307 | 8.4 | 13.5 | Beaver | Daniels | — | — | |
| WV 310 | 16.2 | 26.1 | Fairmont | Grafton | — | — | |
| WV 311 | 4.3 | 6.9 | Virginia state line Virginia | Virginia east of White Sulphur Springs | — | — | |
| WV 331 | 4 | 6.4 | Mount Alto | Cottageville | — | — | |
| WV 338 | — | — | Ravenswood | Ohio state line | — | 2003 | Former designation for the Ravenswood Bridge, replaced by US 33 |
| WV 479 | — | — | Rivesville | I-79 | proposed | — | Proposed Rivesville/I-79 Connector |
| WV 480 | 5.64 | 9.08 | Kearneysville | Maryland state line | — | — | |
| WV 501 | — | — | Tyler Mountain | Tyler Heights | — | — | |
| WV 507 | — | — | — | — | 1978 | 1980 | Signed until 2001; listed as "LSR (Legislative Secondary Route) 507" in 2015 log |
| WV 522 | — | — | — | — | 1941 | 1944 | Temporary designation while the upgrade to US 522 was being completed |
| WV 527 | 2.25 | 3.62 | Huntington | Huntington | — | — | |
| WV 598 | 2.91 | 4.68 | Virginia state line | Bluefield | — | — | |
| WV 601 | 2.4 | 3.9 | Ruth | South Charleston | — | — | |
| WV 612 | 8.40 | 13.52 | Mossy | Oak Hill | — | — | |
| WV 618 | 3.9 | 6.3 | Parkersburg | Parkersburg | — | — | |
| WV 622 | 17.45 | 28.08 | Institute | Pocatalico | — | — | |
| WV 635 | 3.71 | 5.97 | Virginia state line | Jolo | — | — | |
| WV 705 | 3.5 | 5.6 | US 19 in Morgantown | US 119 in Morgantown | — | — | |
| WV 707 | — | — | WV 279 in McAlpin | WV 131 in McAlpin | proposed | — | Proposed upgrade of CR 707 (FBI Center Road) |
| WV 807 | 0.35 | 0.56 | Ohio state line | St. Marys | — | — | |
| WV 817 | 40.3 | 64.9 | St. Albans | Fraziers Bottom | 2008 | current | |
| WV 857 | — | — | US 119 near Morgantown | PA 857 at the Pennsylvania state line | proposed | — | Proposed upgrade of CR 857; East Morgantown Bypass |
| WV 869 | 0.94 | 1.51 | North of Fraziers Bottom | South of Buffalo | — | — | |
| WV 891 | 2.29 | 3.69 | US 250 north of Cameron | PA 21 at Pennsylvania state line northeast of Cameron | — | — | |
| WV 892 | 9.95 | 16.01 | Eli | West of Parkersburg | — | — | |
| WV 901 | 5.65 | 9.09 | Hedgesville | Falling Waters | — | — | |
| WV 956 | 4.18 | 6.73 | Maryland state line | North of Fort Ashby | — | — | |
| WV 971 | 10.23 | 16.46 | Baileysville | Oceana | — | — | |
| WV 972 | 2.19 | 3.52 | — | — | 1978 | 2017 | |
Former; Proposed and unbuilt

== Special routes ==
| Number | Length (mi) | Length (km) | Southern or western terminus | Northern or eastern terminus | Formed | Removed | Notes |
|---|---|---|---|---|---|---|---|
| WV 10 Alt. | — | — | WV 10 in Melissa | US 60 west of Barboursville | — | — | |
| WV 27 Alt. | 6.0 | 9.7 | WV 2 in Follansbee | Pennsylvania state line 5.5 miles (8.9 km) east of Follansbee | — | — | |
| WV 34 Alt. | — | — | Hurricane | US 60 in Hurricane | — | — | |
| WV 45 Alt. | — | — | West of Shepherdstown | Southwest of Shepherdstown | — | — | |
