= West Virginia Route 97 =

State highway in West Virginia, United States

West Virginia Route 97

Route information
- Maintained by WVDOH
- Length: 48.9 mi (78.7 km)

Major junctions
- West end: US 52 / WV 80 in Hanover
- WV 10 near Pineville; WV 54 from Maben to Sophia; WV 16 from Sophia to Mabscott
- East end: I-64 / I-77 / WV 16 in Mabscott

Location
- Country: United States
- State: West Virginia
- Counties: Wyoming, Raleigh

Highway system
- West Virginia State Highway System; Interstate; US; State
← WV 95	→ WV 98

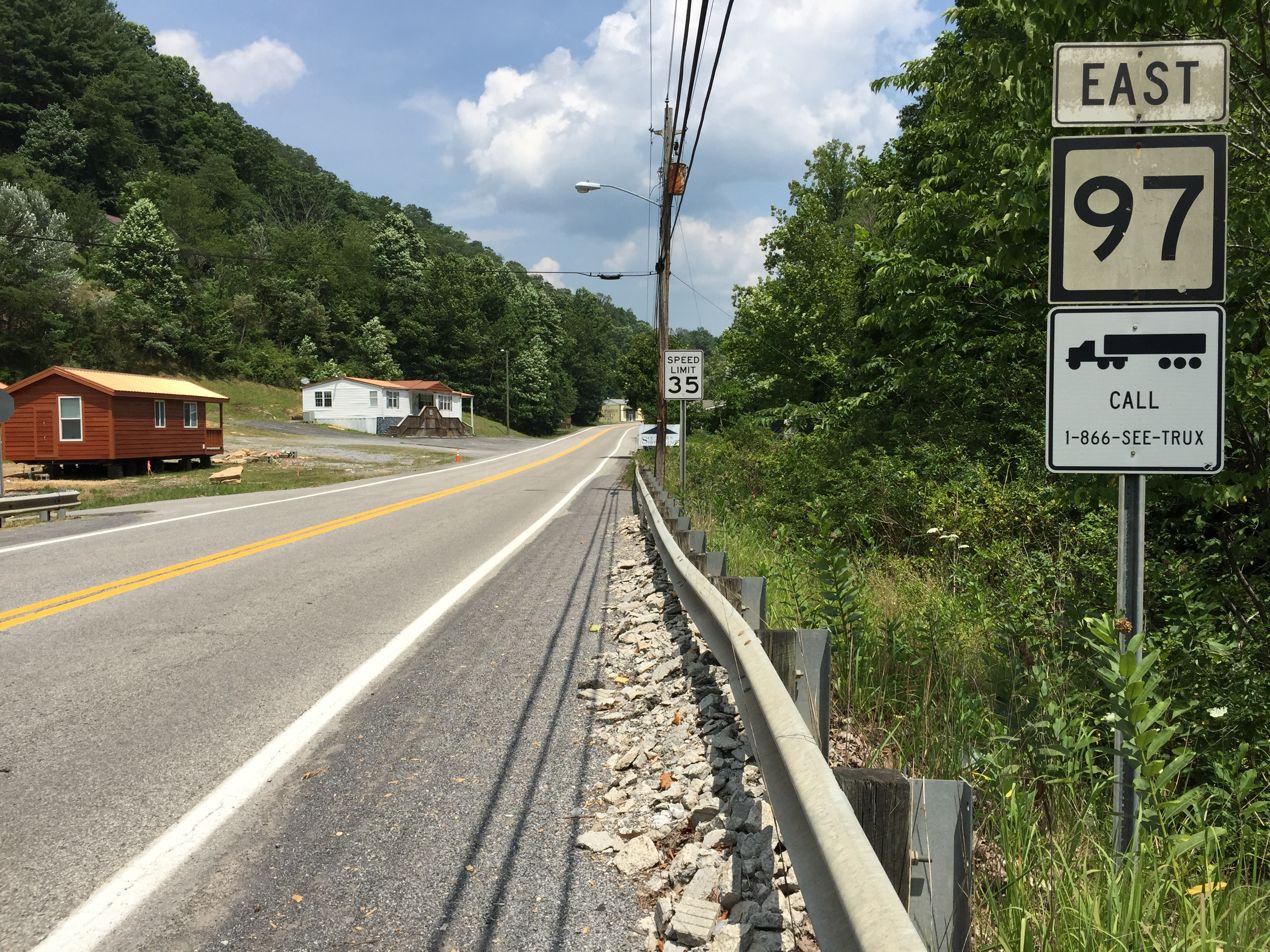
View east along WV 97 at WV 10 in Pineville

West Virginia Route 97 is an east–west state highway in the U.S. state of West Virginia. The western terminus of the route is at U.S. Route 52 and West Virginia Route 80 in Hanover. The eastern terminus is at exit 42 of the West Virginia Turnpike (Interstate 64 and Interstate 77) in Mabscott. West Virginia Route 16, which runs concurrent with WV 97 between Sophia and Mabscott, continues north into Beckley on Robert C. Byrd Drive, the right-of-way of both WV 16 and WV 97.

== Major intersections ==
County	Location	mi	km	Destinations	Notes
Wyoming	Hanover	0.0	0.0	US 52 / WV 80 – Welch, Williamson, Gilbert	
Wyoming	Baileysville			WV 971 north – Oceana	Southern terminus of WV 971.
Wyoming	Pineville			WV 10 south – Mullens, Welch	Western terminus of WV 10 concurrency.
Wyoming	Pineville			WV 10 north – Logan	Eastern terminus of WV 10 concurrency.
Wyoming	Maben			WV 54 south – Mullens	Southern terminus of WV 54 concurrency.
Raleigh	Lester			WV 305 north	Southern terminus of WV 305.
Raleigh				WV 16 north / WV 121 south – Beckley	interchange westbound: east end of WV 54 overlap
Raleigh				WV 16 south – Sophia	eastbound intersection only: east end of WV 54 overlap; west end of WV 16 overlap
Raleigh				WV 121 south (local traffic only) / WV 16 south – Sophia	interchange; southbound exit and northbound entrance westbound: west end of WV 16 overlap
Raleigh	MacArthur			I-64 / I-77 / WV 16 north – Charleston, Bluefield, Beckley	I-77 exit 42; east end of WV 16 overlap
1.000 mi = 1.609 km; 1.000 km = 0.621 mi: Concurrency terminus

== History ==
State Route 97 connects U.S. Highway 52 in the western end of Wyoming County with the county seat of Pineville and goes on to State Route 54 in Maben. Following the linkage of Interstate 64 to the West Virginia Turnpike south of Beckley, the state continued State Route 97 signage across existing State Route 54 to State Route 16 in Sophia and on to the junction with the Turnpike's newly constructed South Valley Drive (now renamed Robert C. Byrd Drive) exit number 42. As a main thoroughfare in Wyoming County, Route 97 serves the coal industry and its workers, and the heavy truck traffic following brought many accidents and made maintenance nearly impossible. The last 20 years have brought improvements and widening to the road, and it could soon lose much traffic to the Coalfields Expressway, a highway that will link the Turnpike to Pineville, Welch, and Buchanan County, Virginia.

== See also ==
- Twin Falls Resort State Park
- R.D. Bailey Dam and Lake
