= West Virginia Route 16 =

North-south state highway in West Virginia, United States

West Virginia Route 16

Route information
- Maintained by WVDOH
- Length: 252.9 mi (407.0 km)

Major junctions
- South end: SR 16 in Bishop
- US 52 in Welch; WV 10 near Pineville; I-64 / I-77 near Beckley; US 19 in Oak Hill; US 60 in Gauley Bridge; I-79 near Big Chimney; US 33 / US 119 near Arnoldsburg; US 50 near Ellenboro
- North end: WV 2 in St. Marys

Location
- Country: United States
- State: West Virginia
- Counties: McDowell, Wyoming, Raleigh, Fayette, Nicholas, Clay, Calhoun, Ritchie, Pleasants

Highway system
- West Virginia State Highway System; Interstate; US; State
← WV 15	→ WV 17

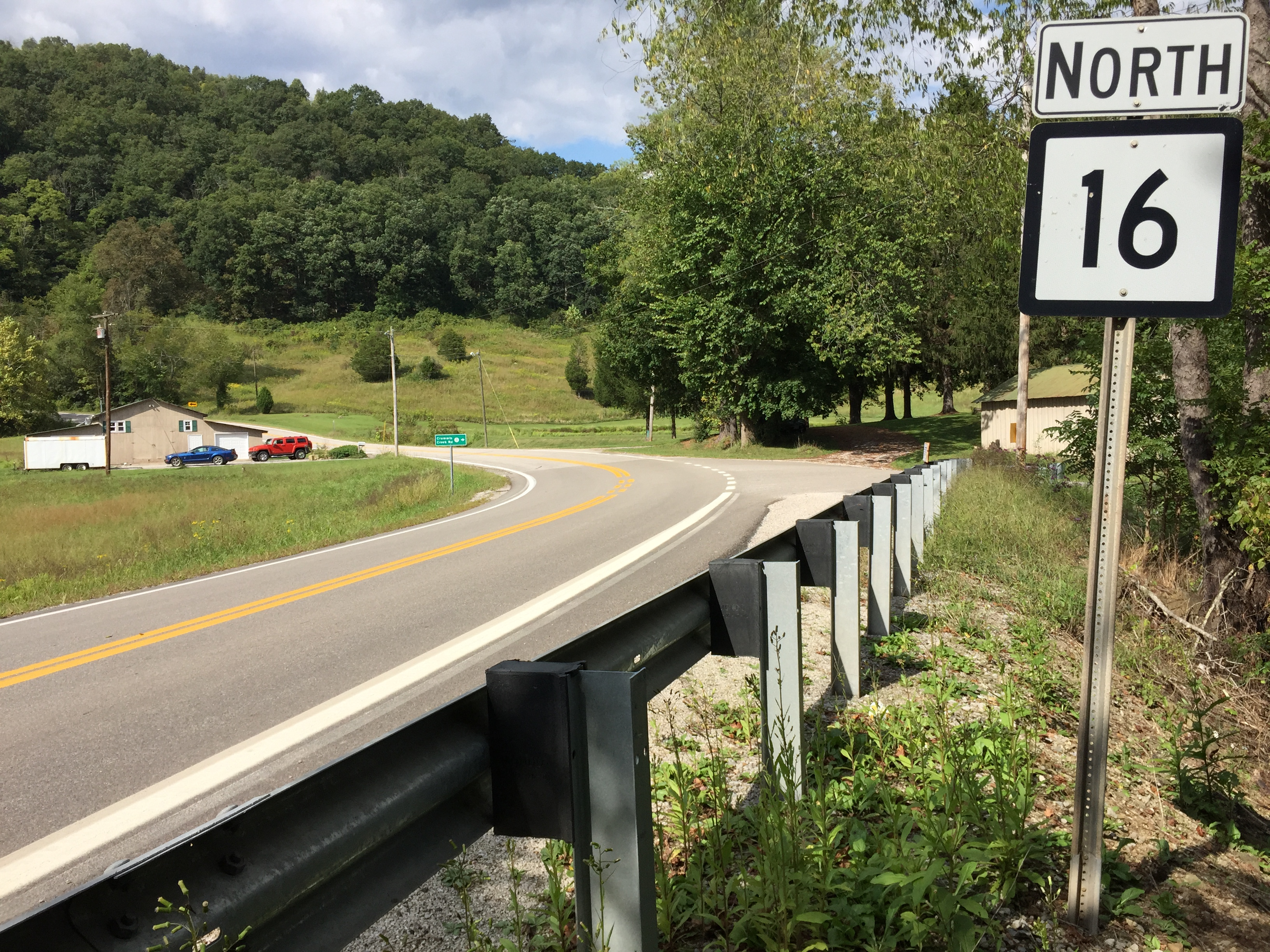
View north along WV 16 at CR 16/25 in Calhoun County

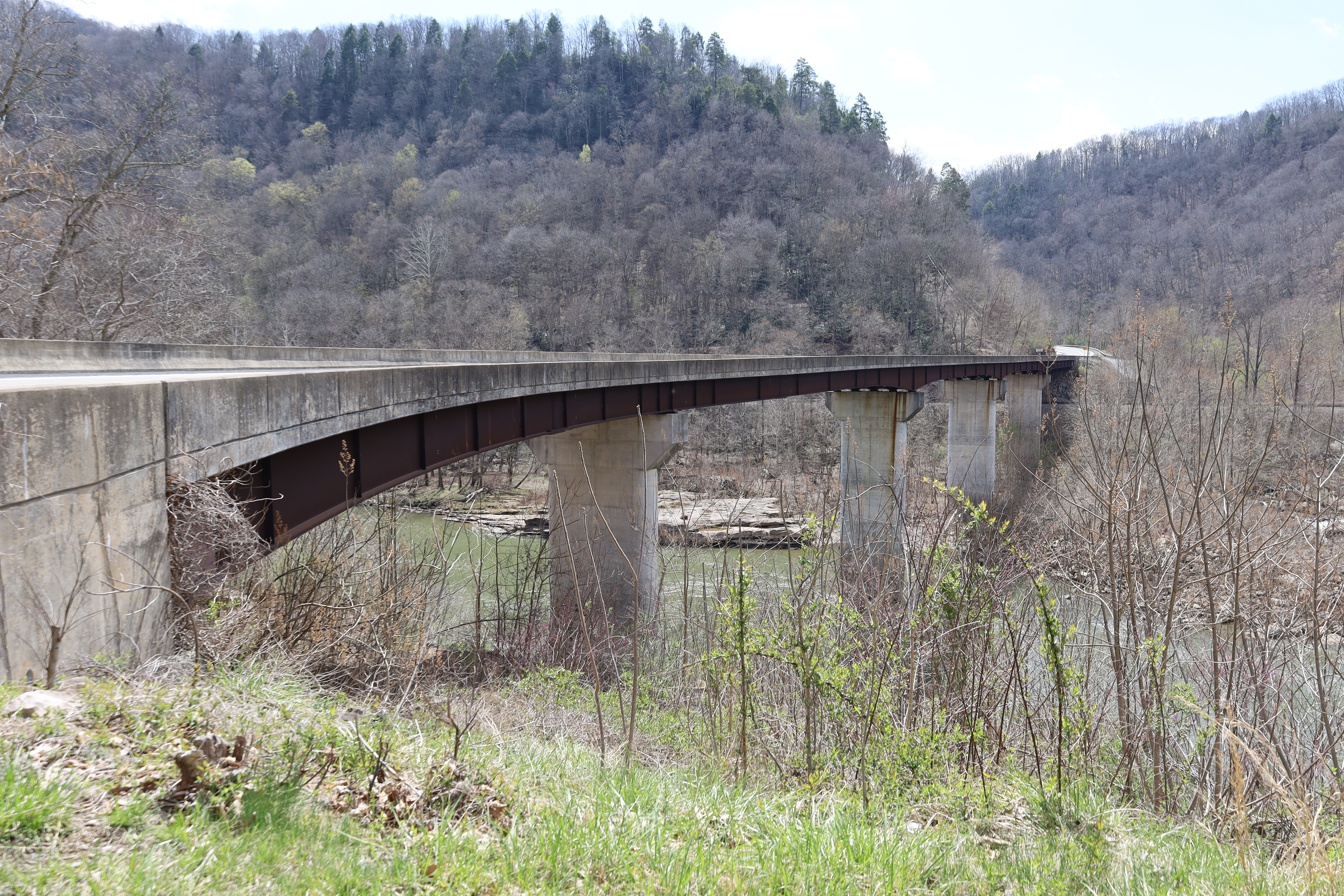
WV 16 crossing the New River in 2022

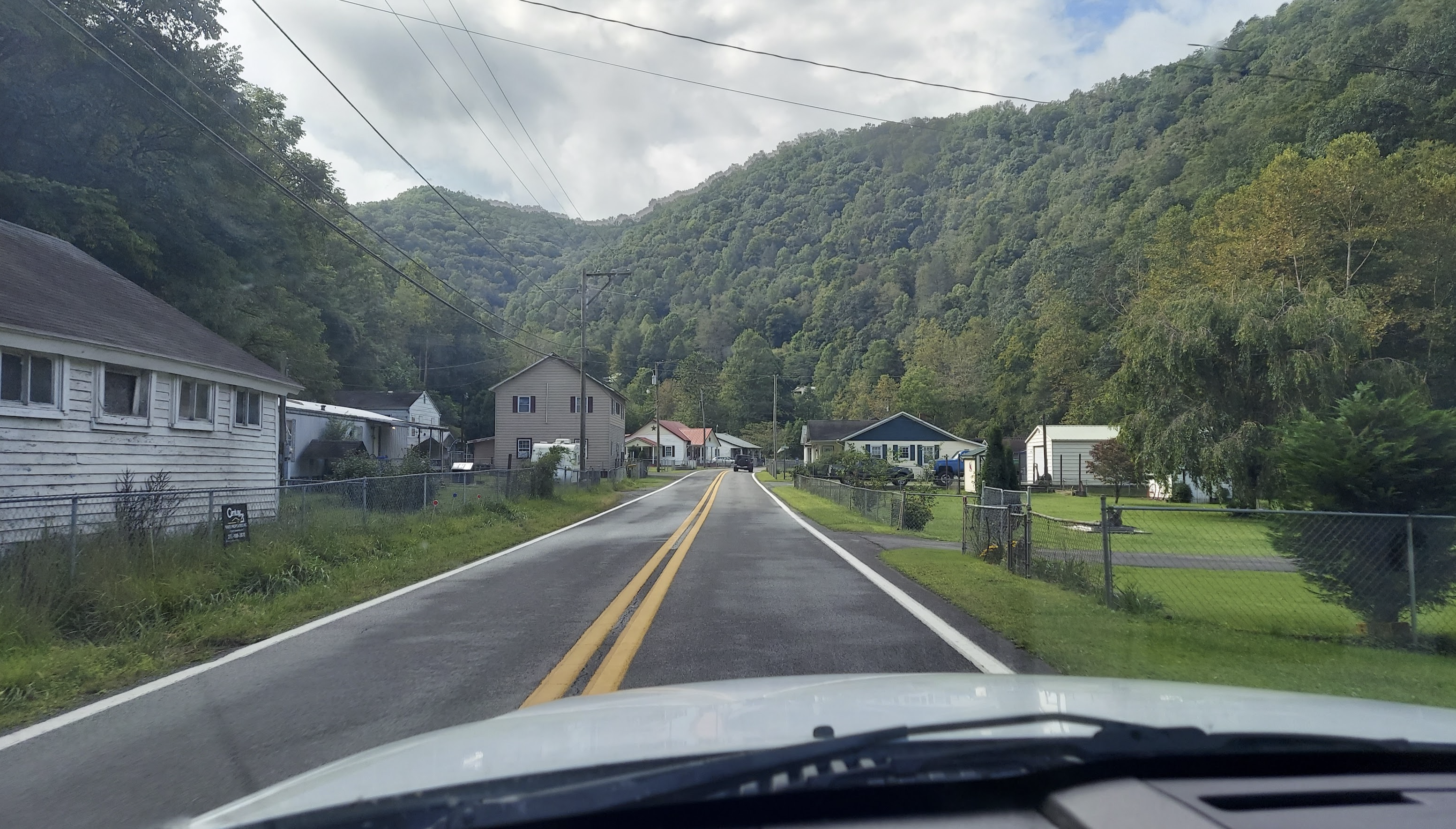
WV 16 passing through Cucumber, West Virginia

West Virginia Route 16 (WV 16) is a north–south route located in the U.S. State of West Virginia. The southern terminus of the route is at the Virginia state line in Bishop, McDowell County, where the route continues south as Virginia State Route 16. The northern terminus is at West Virginia Route 2 in St. Marys, Pleasants County, on the south bank of the Ohio River. WV 16 continues as a same-numbered route into Virginia and North Carolina, ultimately ending in Waxhaw, south of Charlotte and just north of the South Carolina border. The total length of highway is just under 475 miles (764 km) long.

== Major intersections ==
County	Location	mi	km	Destinations	Notes
McDowell	Bishop			SR 16 south – Tazewell, Marion, Mouth of Wilson	Continuation from Virginia
McDowell	Bishop			WV 161 north – Anawalt	
McDowell				WV 83 west – Bradshaw	
McDowell	Welch			US 52 north – Iaeger, Williamson	south end of US 52 overlap
McDowell	Welch			US 52 south / WV 103 east – Bluefield, Gary	north end of US 52 overlap; south end of US 52 Alt. overlap
McDowell	Welch			US 52 Alt. south (Elkhorn Street)	north end of US 52 Alt. overlap
Wyoming	Pineville			WV 10 north to WV 97 – Pineville, Twin Falls Resort State Park	south end of WV 10 overlap
Wyoming				WV 10 south – Princeton	north end of WV 10 overlap
Wyoming	Mullens			WV 54 north – Beckley, Twin Falls Resort State Park	
Raleigh				WV 54 south / WV 97 west – Mullens	south end of WV 97 overlap
Raleigh				WV 121 south (local traffic only) / WV 54 south – Mullens	interchange; southbound exit and northbound entrance
Raleigh	MacArthur			I-64 / I-77 – Charleston, Bluefield	I-77 exit 42; north end of WV 97 overlap
Raleigh	Mabscott			Mabscott	interchange
Raleigh	Beckley			Walker Avenue	interchange; southbound access only
Raleigh	Beckley			To WV 3 east / Central Avenue	south end of WV 3 west overlap (northbound only)
Raleigh	Beckley			WV 3 east (Neville Street) – Downtown Beckley	
Raleigh	Beckley			WV 3 west (Prince Street / Harper Road) to I-77	north end of WV 3 west overlap (northbound only)
Raleigh	Beckley			WV 210 south (North Kanawha Street)	
Raleigh	Beckley			US 19 south (Eisenhower Drive) / CR 8 (Ragland Road)	south end of US 19 overlap
Raleigh				US 19 north to I-64 / I-77 – Charleston, Bluefield, Oak Hill, Summersville	interchange; north end of US 19 overlap
Raleigh	Bradley			To US 19	
Fayette	Mount Hope			WV 211 north – Downtown Mount Hope	
Fayette	Mount Hope			WV 61 south – Prince	south end of WV 61 overlap
Fayette	Mount Hope			WV 211 south – Downtown Mount Hope	
Fayette				To US 19	
Fayette	Oak Hill			US 19 south – Beckley	south end of US 19 overlap
Fayette	Oak Hill			US 19 north / CR 18 (Pea Ridge Road) – Summersville	interchange; northbound exit and southbound entrance; north end of US 19 overlap
Fayette	Oak Hill			WV 61 north – Montgomery	north end of WV 61 overlap
Fayette	Oak Hill			US 19 – Summersville, Beckley	interchange
Fayette	Oak Hill			CR 21/18 (Lochgelly Road) to US 19 – Beckley, Summersville	
Fayette	Fayetteville			US 19 – Beckley, Summersville	
Fayette	Chimney Corner			US 60 east – Rainelle, Hawks Nest State Park	south end of US 60 overlap
Fayette	Gauley Bridge			US 60 west – Charleston	north end of US 60 overlap; south end of WV 39 overlap
Fayette	Belva			WV 39 east – Summersville	north end of WV 39 overlap
Clay	Clay			WV 4 south – Clendenin	south end of WV 4 overlap
Clay				WV 4 north – Sutton	north end of WV 4 overlap
Clay				I-79 – Charleston, Clarksburg	I-79 exit 40
Calhoun				US 33 west / US 119 south – Spencer	south end of US 33 / US 119 overlap
Calhoun	Millstone			US 33 east / US 119 north – Weston, Glenville	north end of US 33 / US 119 overlap
Calhoun	Grantsville			WV 5 – Elizabeth, Glenville	
Ritchie	Smithville			WV 47 east – Weston	south end of WV 47 overlap
Ritchie	Smithville			WV 47 west – Parkersburg	north end of WV 47 overlap
Ritchie	Harrisville			WV 31 (Main Street) – Cairo, North Bend State Park	
Ritchie	Ellenboro			US 50 – Parkersburg, Clarksburg	interchange
Pleasants	St. Marys			WV 2 – Parkersburg, Wheeling	
1.000 mi = 1.609 km; 1.000 km = 0.621 mi: Concurrency terminus

== See also ==
- Esso Station
