= Slab Fork =

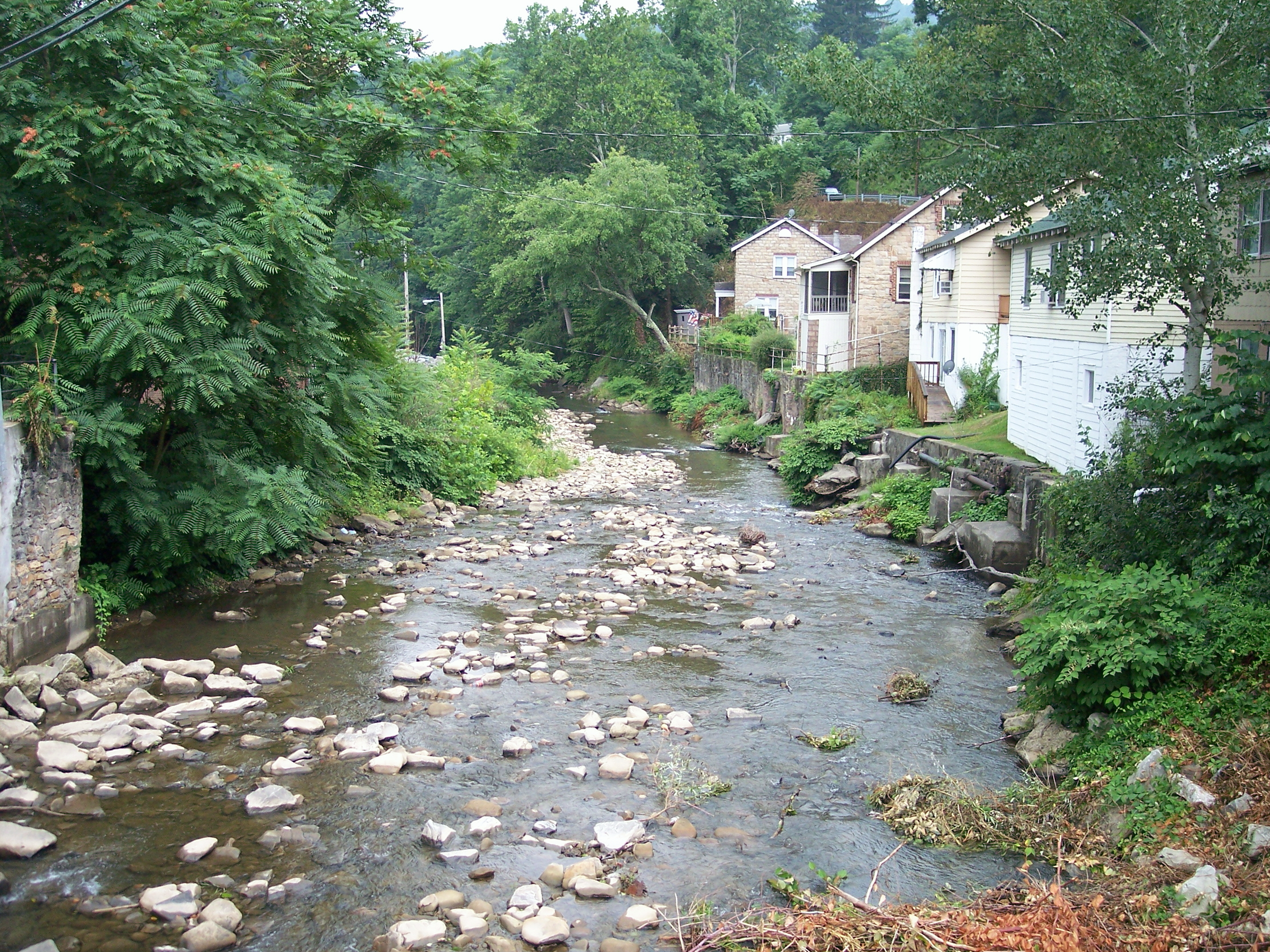
- Slab Fork in Mullens in 2007

- Location of the mouth of the Slab Fork in Mullens, West Virginia

Location
- Country: United States
- State: West Virginia
- Counties: Raleigh, Wyoming

Physical characteristics
- Source
  - location: south of Lester
  - coordinates: 37.7090031°N 81.2920465°W
  - elevation: 2,364 ft (721 m)
- Mouth: Guyandotte River
  - location: Mullens
  - coordinates: 37.5817809°N 81.3817692°W
  - elevation: 1,411 ft (430 m)
- Length: 15.1 mi (24.3 km)
- Basin size: 35.36 sq mi (91.6 km^{2})

The Slab Fork is a tributary of the Guyandotte River, 15.1 miles (24.3 km) long, in southern West Virginia in the United States. Via the Guyandotte and Ohio rivers, it is part of the watershed of the Mississippi River, draining an area of 35.36 square miles (91.6 km^{2}) in a mainly rural area on the unglaciated portion of the Allegheny Plateau.

The Slab Fork rises in Raleigh County, approximately 2 miles (3.2 km) south of Lester and 2.5 miles (4.0 km) west of Sophia, and initially flows generally southwestward through the communities of Slab Fork and Hotchkiss into eastern Wyoming County, where it turns southward and flows through the communities of Maben, Pierpont, and Otsego, to the city of Mullens, where it flows into the Guyandotte River from the north. Between Slab Fork and Mullens, the stream is paralleled by West Virginia Route 54.

According to 1992 data from the United States Geological Survey, approximately 95% of the Slab Fork watershed was forested; approximately 2% was used for agriculture; and approximately 1% was used for commercial or mining purposes.

== See also ==
- List of rivers of West Virginia
