= U.S. Route 121 =

Proposed highway in the United States

U.S. Route 121
- Coalfields Expressway
- Open segment (WV 121) in red, approximate alignment of future segments in blue

Route information
- Auxiliary route of US 21
- Length: 108.35 mi (174.37 km)
- Existed: 1998–present

Major junctions
- South end: US 23 in Pound, VA
- North end: I-64 / I-77 near Beckley, WV

Location
- Country: United States
- States: Virginia, West Virginia

Highway system
- United States Numbered Highway System; List; Special; Divided
- Virginia Routes; Interstate; US; Primary; Secondary; Byways; History; HOT lanes
- West Virginia State Highway System; Interstate; US; State
← SR 120	VA	→ SR 121
← US 119	WV	→ WV 122

U.S. Route 121 (US 121) is a proposed U.S. highway designated as the Coalfields Expressway, a four-lane highway stretching from Beckley, West Virginia, to Pound, Virginia, approximately 108 miles (174 km) in length. It is designed to connect Interstate 64 (I-64) and I-77 in West Virginia near Beckley to US 23 in Wise County, Virginia, at Pound. While US 121 will not connect directly to US 21, it will intersect at the latter road's original alignment, now a part of I-77.

== History ==
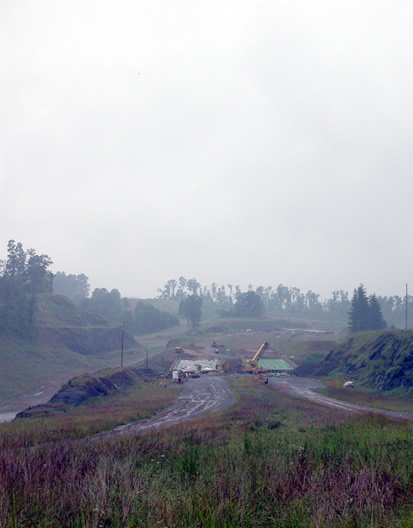
The Coalfields Expressway interchange with WV 54 under construction in 2004 near Sophia, West Virginia.

The Coalfields Expressway will depart from US 23 in Pound, Virginia, in Wise County, and roughly follow Virginia State Route 83 (SR 83) in Buchanan County to West Virginia Route 83 (WV 83) in McDowell County, West Virginia. Then it will travel northeast through depressed areas of West Virginia, paralleling West Virginia Route 16 through Wyoming and Raleigh counties. It will then run toward an expanded Interstate 64/Interstate 77 interchange near Beckley. The roadways US 121 will replace are deficient in the fact that the existing roadways have limited passing opportunities, steep grades, and low design speeds.

As of October 2020, 13.2 miles (21.2 km) of US 121 is open to traffic in West Virginia (from the connector to WV 54 near Mullens and WV 16/WV 97 in Sophia) is currently signed as West Virginia Route 121 (WV 121).

=== Virginia ===
In Virginia, the Coalfields Expressway will run for 49.25 miles (79.26 km), following Virginia State Route 83 from the West Virginia border to U.S. Route 23 in Pound. Near the Grundy - Vansant area, U.S. Route 460 will become a new four-lane highway connecting the Coalfields Expressway with Breaks Interstate Park at the Virginia / Kentucky border and Elkhorn City, Kentucky.

=== West Virginia ===
West Virginia Route 121
- Location: Mullens–Sophia
- Length: 13.2 mi (21.2 km)
- Existed: 2017–present

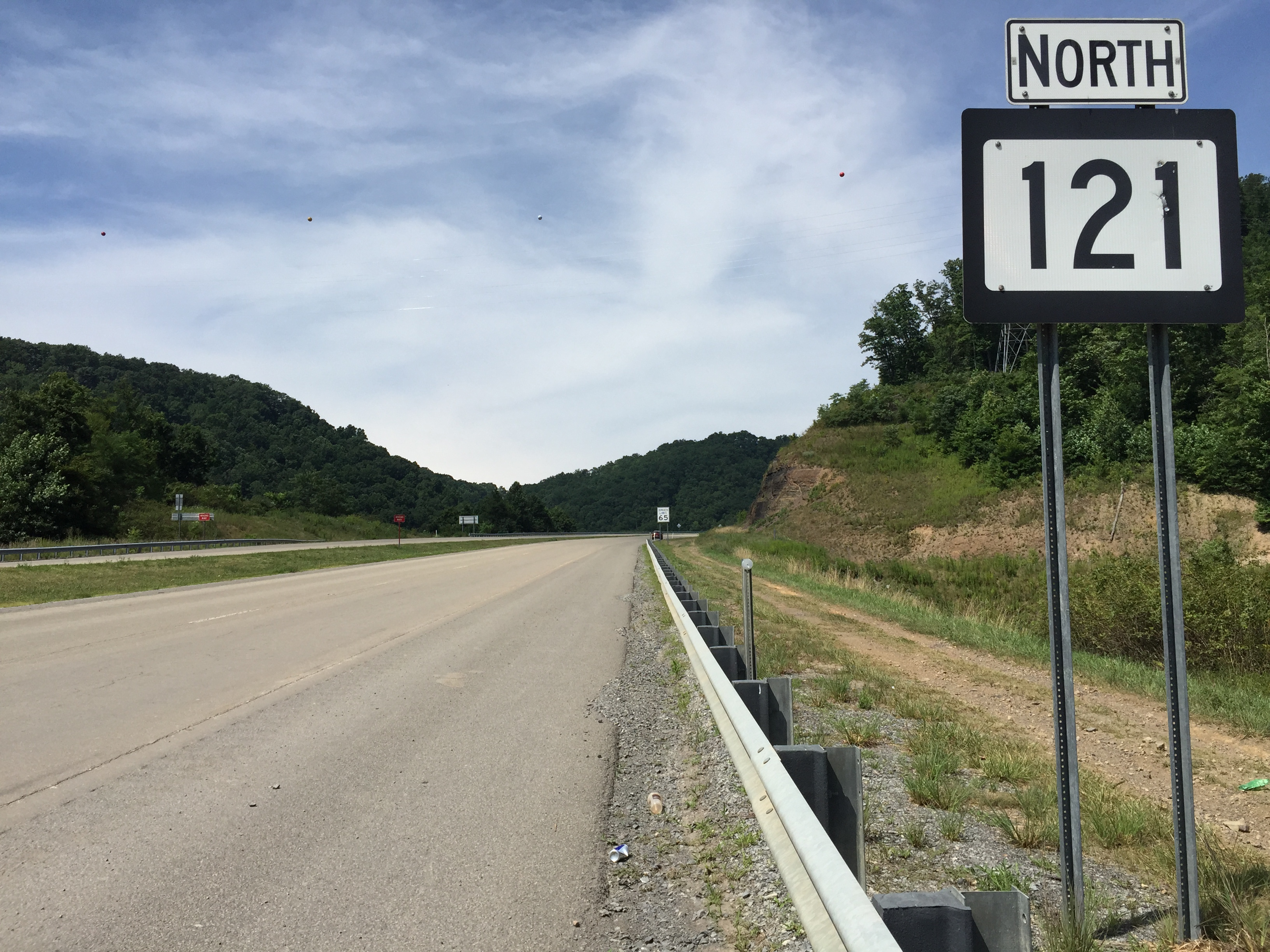
View north along WV 121 at CR 34 (Slab Fork Road) in Slab Fork

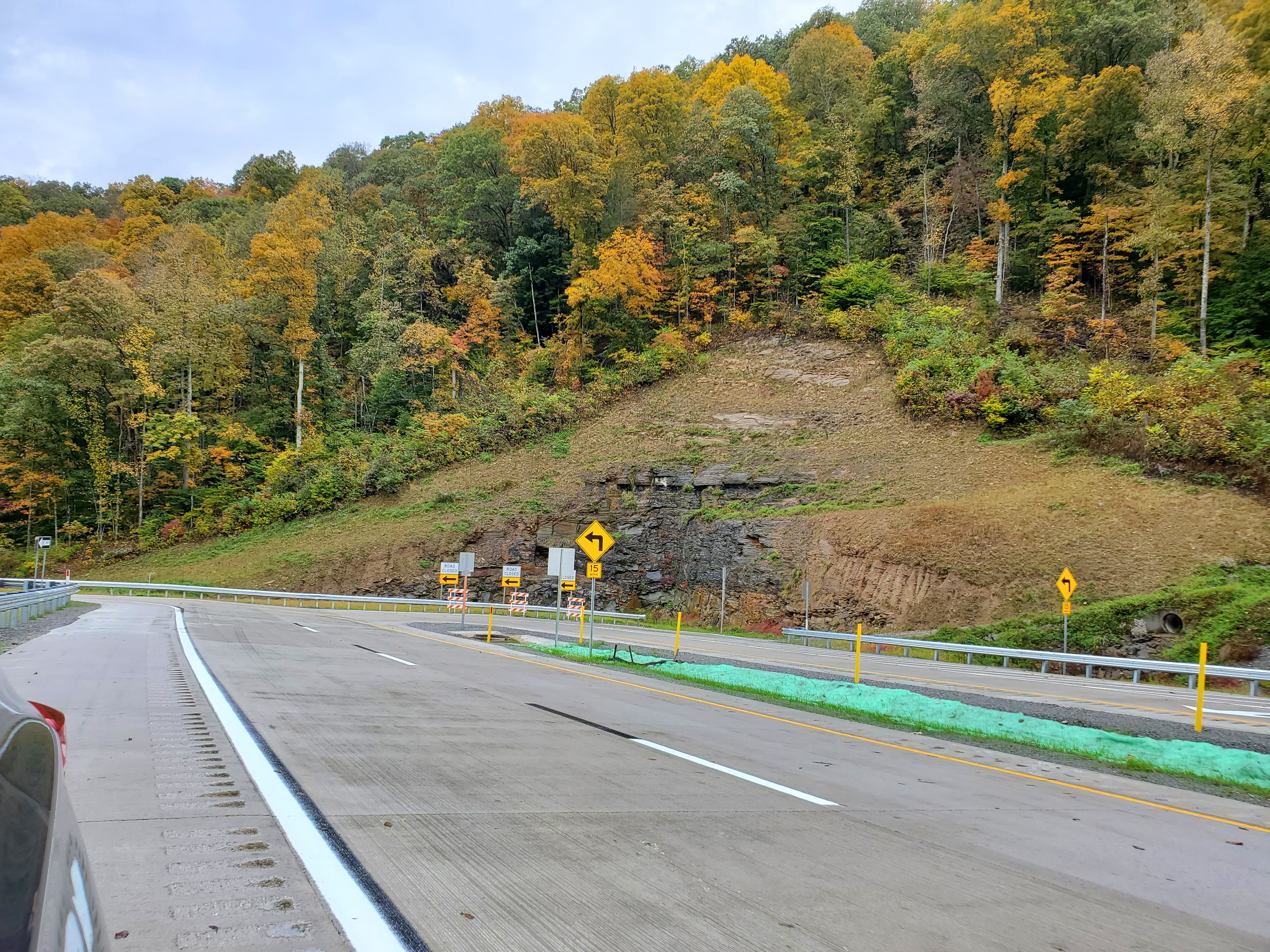
Current southern end of WV 121 at the connector to WV 54

Construction started in 1999 with grading near Welch in southern West Virginia. Work was completed in 2003.

Further eastward, work is continuing on a segment of the Expressway in the vicinity of Sophia and Crab Orchard near Beckley totaling 3.5 miles (5.6 km). Grading and preliminary paving operations have been completed, as well as the gradings and bridge construction for a diamond interchange for West Virginia Route 54 and a bridge over West Virginia Route 16. In November 2004, a contract was awarded for paving operations at a cost of $11.5 million from Surveyor Creek Road to the West Virginia Route 16 interchange. With this segment of the Expressway completed, a new tie-in will be complete from Surveyor Creek Road to five-lane West Virginia Route 16, as well as an interchange with West Virginia Route 54.

Two contracts totaling $22.2 million are currently under construction. One project involves grading and drainage operations on 2.57 miles (4.14 km) of US 121 from Big Ridge to Surveyor Creek Road that involves nearly five million cubic yards (3,800,000 m^{3}) of excavation.

In the fall of 2013, two contracts were awarded to grade and drain an additional two miles (3.2 km) of US 121 near Helen. It is one of four projects planned to complete the road to Mullens.

Following the election of Governor Jim Justice in 2016, the newly elected Governor began aggressively pushing for the highway's completion. Governor Justice requested $54.4 million for grading in Wyoming County. The construction would be financed through raising taxes. In an upcoming ballot issue to approve of road bonds, Governor Justice allocated $55 million to extend the road from Slab Fork to Mullens and eventually to Welch. The ballot issue passed. On October 1, 2020, the extension to Mullens opened at a ceremony attended by Governor Justice.

== Major intersections ==
Mileposts are approximate.

State	County	Location	mi	km	Destinations	Notes
Virginia	Wise	Pound	0.00	0.00	US 23 (Orby Cantrell Highway)	Proposed southern terminus
Virginia	Dickenson		6.8	10.9	SR 721	Proposed junction
Virginia	Dickenson		22.45	36.13	SR 80	Proposed junction
Virginia	Buchanan		27.75	44.66	US 460 west	Proposed interchange at new US 460 alignment; south end of US 460 concurrency
Virginia	Buchanan		29.75	47.88	SR 614	Proposed junction
Virginia	Buchanan				US 460 east	Proposed north end of US 460 concurrency
Virginia	Buchanan		44.25	71.21	SR 643 (Hurley Road)	Proposed junction
Virginia	Buchanan				SR 83 west	Proposed south end of SR 83 concurrency
Virginia–West Virginia line	Buchanan–McDowell county line		49.25 0.00	79.26 0.00	SR 83 ends / WV 83 begins	Proposed junction
West Virginia	McDowell	Bradshaw	7.0	11.3	WV 80 north	Proposed junction
West Virginia	McDowell				WV 83 east	Proposed north end of WV 83 concurrency
West Virginia	McDowell	Welch	21.0	33.8	US 52	Proposed junction
West Virginia	Wyoming		27.0	43.5	WV 16	Proposed interchange
West Virginia	Wyoming	Pineville	35.0	56.3	WV 10	Proposed junction
West Virginia	Wyoming	Mullens	42.5	68.4	WV 54	Temporary southern end
West Virginia	Raleigh				WV 54 / WV 97 to WV 16 south – Sophia, Lester	Interchange
West Virginia	Raleigh	Sophia	55.5	89.3	WV 16 north (WV 97 east) – Beckley	Interchange; temporary northern end
West Virginia	Raleigh		59.1	95.1	I-64 / I-77 (West Virginia Turnpike)	Proposed northern terminus; interchange
1.000 mi = 1.609 km; 1.000 km = 0.621 mi: Unopened
