= Otsego, West Virginia =

Community in West Virginia, US

Otsego
- Unincorporated community
- Location within the state of West Virginia Otsego (the United States)
- Coordinates: 37°36′37″N 81°22′35″W
- Country: United States
- State: West Virginia
- County: Wyoming
- Time zone: UTC-5 (Eastern (EST))
  - Summer (DST): UTC-4 (EDT)

Otsego is an unincorporated community in Wyoming County, West Virginia, United States, along the Slab Fork and West Virginia Route 54. It was also known as Caloric.

Otsego is a name derived from a Native American language.
