= Pierpont, Wyoming County, West Virginia =

Community in West Virginia, US

Pierpont
- Unincorporated community
- Location within the state of West Virginia Pierpont (the United States)
- Coordinates: 37°37′38″N 81°23′32″W
- Country: United States
- State: West Virginia
- County: Wyoming
- Time zone: UTC-5 (Eastern (EST))
  - Summer (DST): UTC-4 (EDT)
- GNIS feature ID: 1544806

Pierpont is an unincorporated community in Wyoming County, West Virginia, United States, along the Slab Fork and West Virginia Route 54.

The community was named after J. Pierpont Morgan.
