= Hotchkiss, West Virginia =

Hotchkiss
- Unincorporated community
- Location within the state of West Virginia Hotchkiss (the United States)
- Coordinates: 37°40′27″N 81°22′2″W
- Country: United States
- State: West Virginia
- County: Raleigh
- Time zone: UTC-5 (Eastern (EST))
  - Summer (DST): UTC-4 (EDT)

Hotchkiss is an unincorporated community in Raleigh County, West Virginia, United States, along the Slab Fork and West Virginia Route 54.
