= West Virginia Route 305 =

State highway in West Virginia, United States

West Virginia Route 305
- WV 305 highlighted in red

Route information
- Maintained by WVDOH
- Length: 3.0 mi (4.8 km)

Major junctions
- South end: WV 54 / WV 97 in Lester
- North end: WV 3 near Surveyor

Location
- Country: United States
- State: West Virginia
- Counties: Raleigh

Highway system
- West Virginia State Highway System; Interstate; US; State
← WV 279	→ WV 307

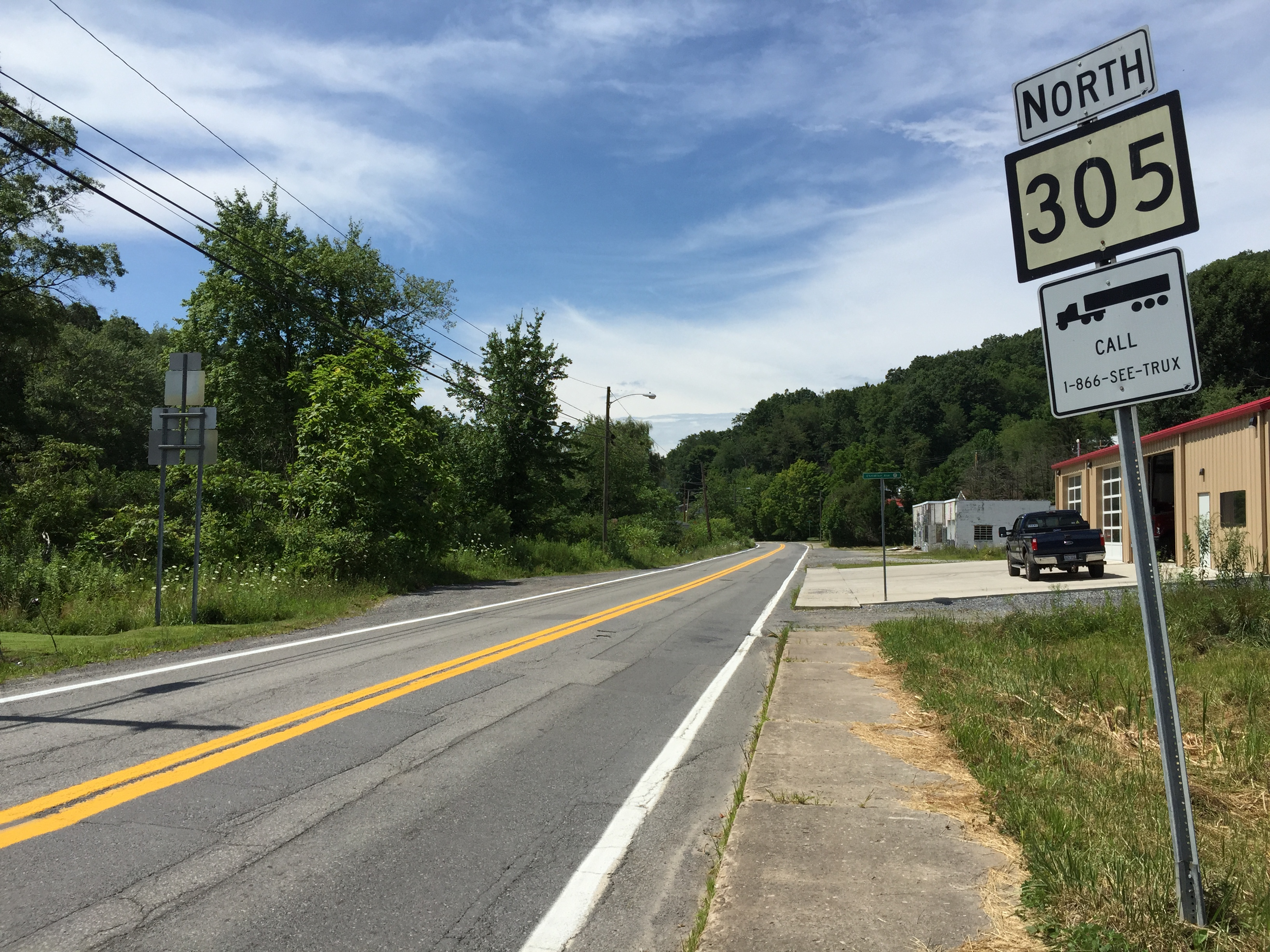
View north along WV 305 in Lester

West Virginia Route 305 (WV 305) is a north–south state highway located entirely in Raleigh County, West Virginia. The southern terminus of the route is at West Virginia Route 54 / West Virginia Route 97 in Lester. The northern terminus is at West Virginia Route 3 near Surveyor.

WV 305 was formerly County Route 17, which continued east from Lester to Crab Orchard on modern and old WV 54.

== Major intersections ==
The entire route is in Raleigh County.

Location	mi	km	Destinations	Notes
Lester			WV 54 / WV 97 – Beckley, Mullens	
			WV 3	
1.000 mi = 1.609 km; 1.000 km = 0.621 mi
