= McAlpin, West Virginia =

McAlpin, West Virginia may refer to the following communities in the U.S. state of West Virginia:

- McAlpin, Harrison County, West Virginia
- McAlpin, Raleigh County, West Virginia
