= Chimney Corner, West Virginia =

Unincorporated community in West Virginia, United States

- Unincorporated community
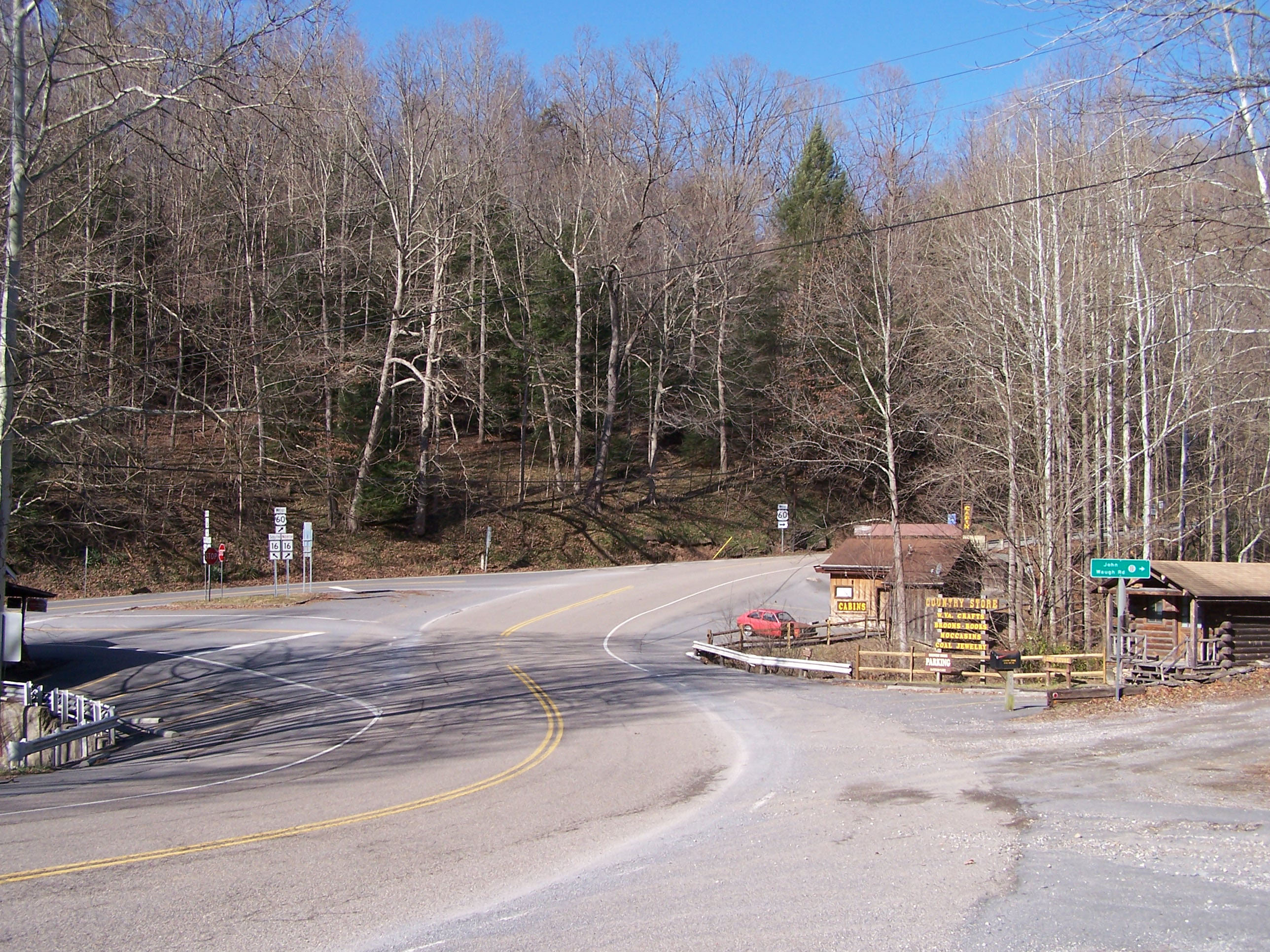
- A small country store on the right side of the curving road is surrounded by hills and rugged landscape at Chimney Corner.

- Location within West Virginia Location within the United States
- Coordinates: 38°08′20″N 81°08′49″W
- Country: United States
- State: West Virginia
- County: Fayette
- Elevation: 1,070 ft (330 m)
- Time zone: UTC-5 (Eastern (EST))
  - Summer (DST): UTC-4 (EDT)
- Area codes: 304 & 681
- GNIS feature ID: 1554132

Chimney Corner is an unincorporated community in Fayette County, West Virginia, United States. Chimney Corner is located at the junction of U.S. Route 60 and West Virginia Route 16, 3.5 miles (5.6 km) southeast of Gauley Bridge.
