= West Virginia Route 211 =

State highway in West Virginia, United States

West Virginia Route 211

Route information
- Maintained by WVDOH
- Length: 1.4 mi (2.3 km)

Major junctions
- South end: WV 16 in Mount Hope
- North end: WV 16 / WV 61 in Mount Hope

Location
- Country: United States
- State: West Virginia
- Counties: Fayette

Highway system
- West Virginia State Highway System; Interstate; US; State
← WV 210	→ WV 214

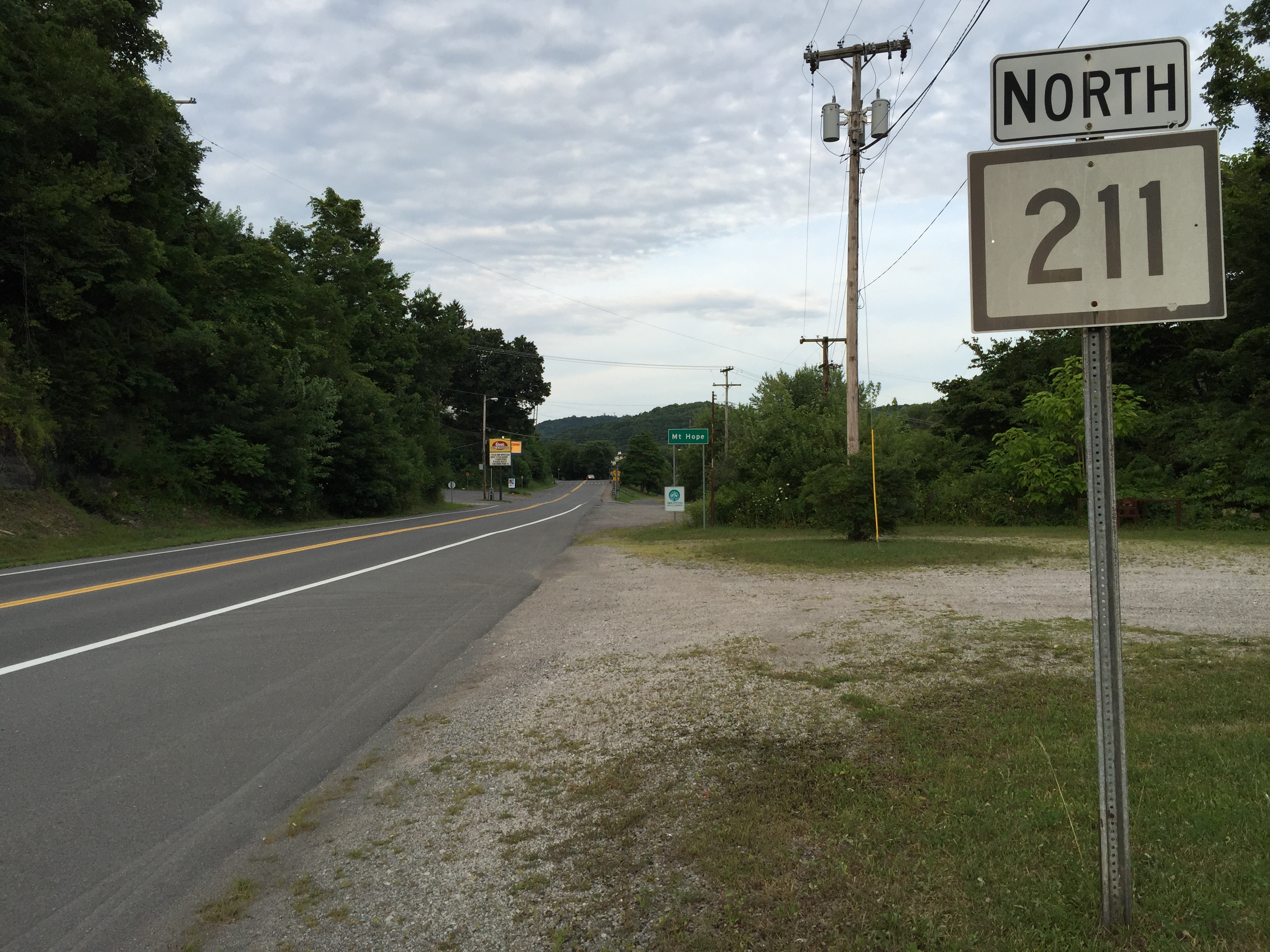
View north along WV 211 at WV 16 in Mount Hope

West Virginia Route 211 is a north–south state highway located in and near Mount Hope, West Virginia. The southern terminus of the route is at West Virginia Route 16 in western Mount Hope. The northern terminus is at WV 16 and West Virginia Route 61 on the northern edge of Mount Hope.

== History ==
All of WV 211 was once part of U.S. Route 21 prior to construction of the Mount Hope bypass.

== Major intersections ==
The entire route is in Fayette County.

Location	mi	km	Destinations	Notes
Mount Hope			WV 16 – Beckley, Oak Hill	
Mount Hope			WV 16 / WV 61 – Oak Hill, Prince, Beckley	
1.000 mi = 1.609 km; 1.000 km = 0.621 mi
