= Mullens Historic District =

Historic district in West Virginia, United States

- U.S. National Register of Historic Places
- U.S. Historic district
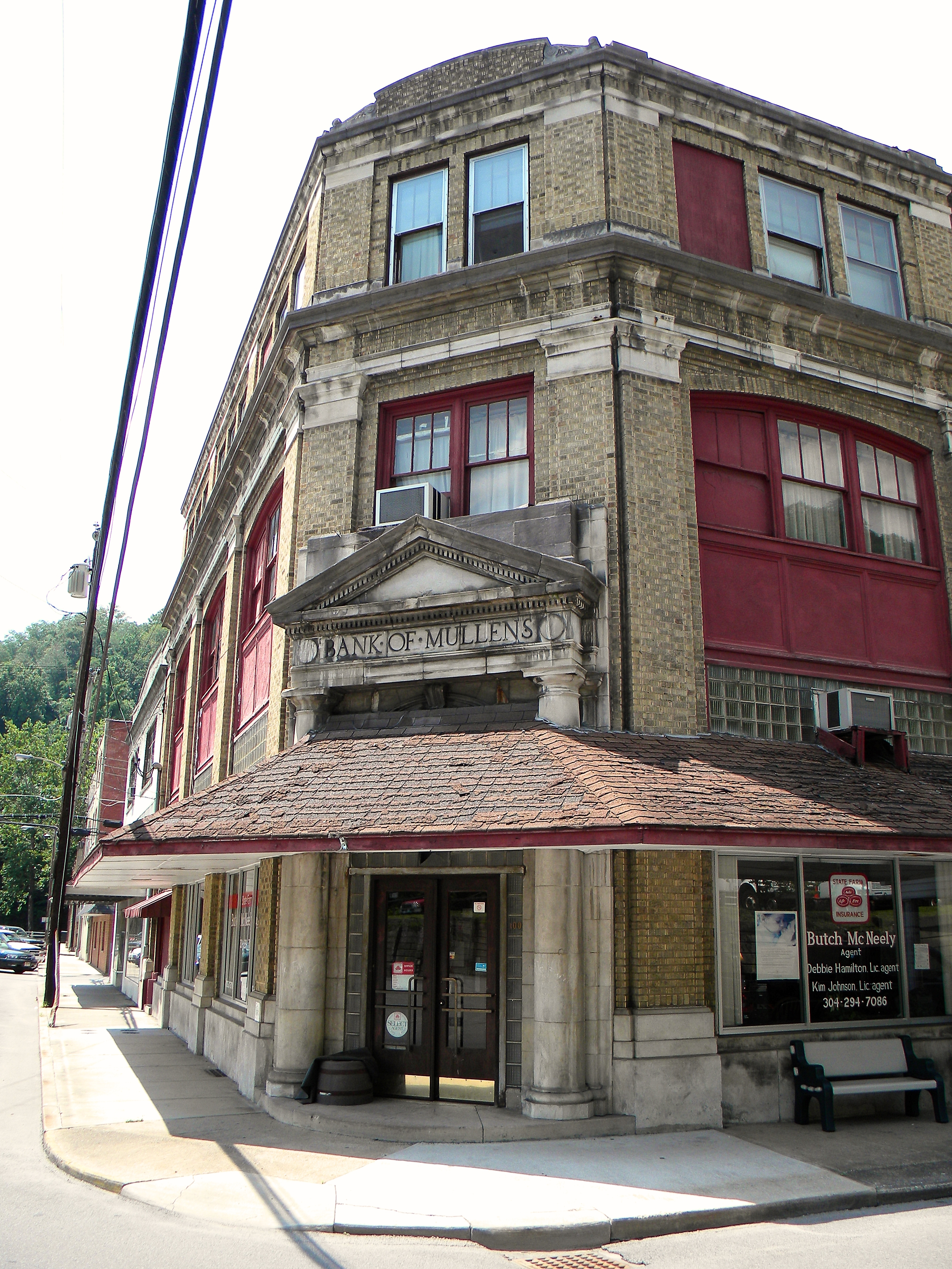
- Bank of Mullens, West Virginia, July 2009

- Location within West Virginia Location within the United States
- Location: Roughly bounded by Lusk and Highland Aves., the Norfolk & Southern RR tracks and Water St., Mullens, West Virginia
- Coordinates: 37°34′57″N 81°23′5″W
- Area: 38.5 acres (15.6 ha)
- Built: 1912
- Architect: Early, Jubal Anderson, et al.
- Architectural style: Queen Anne, Early Commercial, Bungalow/Craftsman
- NRHP reference No.: 93001233
- Added to NRHP: November 16, 1993

Mullens Historic District is a national historic district located at Mullens, Wyoming County, West Virginia. It encompasses 95 contributing buildings and one contributing structure in the central business district of Mullens. It also includes surrounding residential areas. Notable buildings include the Highlawn Baptist Church (1925), Old Presbyterian Church, Wyoming Hotel (1918), Bank of Mullens Building (1920), Masonic Hall Building (1924), Old Hospital / Webster Apartments (c. 1928), Smiley Department Store Building (1921), Piggly Wiggly Building (1929).

It was listed on the National Register of Historic Places in 1993.
