= West Virginia Route 80 =

State highway in West Virginia, United States

West Virginia Route 80

Route information
- Maintained by WVDOH
- Length: 41.1 mi (66.1 km)

Major junctions
- South end: WV 83 in Bradshaw
- US 52 from Iaeger to Gilbert; WV 97 near Hanover
- North end: WV 10 near Man

Location
- Country: United States
- State: West Virginia
- Counties: McDowell, Wyoming, Mingo, Logan

Highway system
- West Virginia State Highway System; Interstate; US; State
← I-79	→ I-81

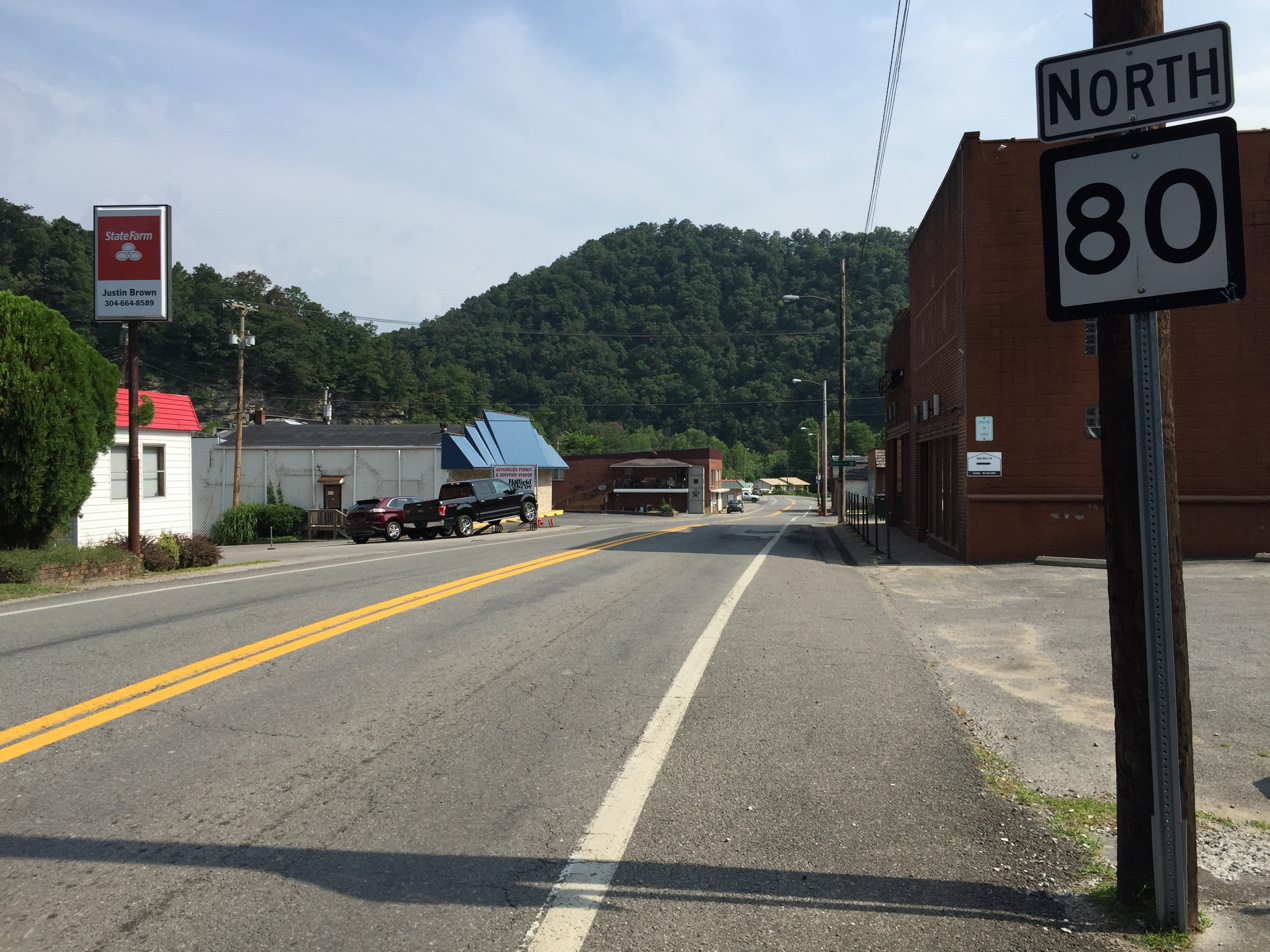
View north along WV 80 at US 52 in Gilbert

West Virginia Route 80 is a north–south state highway in southern West Virginia. The southern terminus of the route is at West Virginia Route 83 in Bradshaw. The northern terminus is at West Virginia Route 10 south of Man.

== Major intersections ==
County	Location	mi	km	Destinations	Notes
McDowell	Bradshaw			WV 83 – War, Grundy, VA	
McDowell	Iaeger			US 52 south – Welch	south end of US 52 overlap
Wyoming	Hanover			WV 97 east – Pineville	
Mingo	Gilbert			US 52 north – Williamson	north end of US 52 overlap
Logan	Huff Junction			WV 10 – Logan, Oceana, Pineville	
1.000 mi = 1.609 km; 1.000 km = 0.621 mi: Concurrency terminus
