= West Virginia Route 210 =

State highway in West Virginia, United States

West Virginia Route 210

Route information
- Maintained by WVDOH
- Length: 2.9 mi (4.7 km)

Major junctions
- South end: US 19 in Beckley
- WV 41 in Beckley
- North end: WV 16 in Beckley

Location
- Country: United States
- State: West Virginia
- Counties: Raleigh

Highway system
- West Virginia State Highway System; Interstate; US; State
← WV 193	→ WV 211

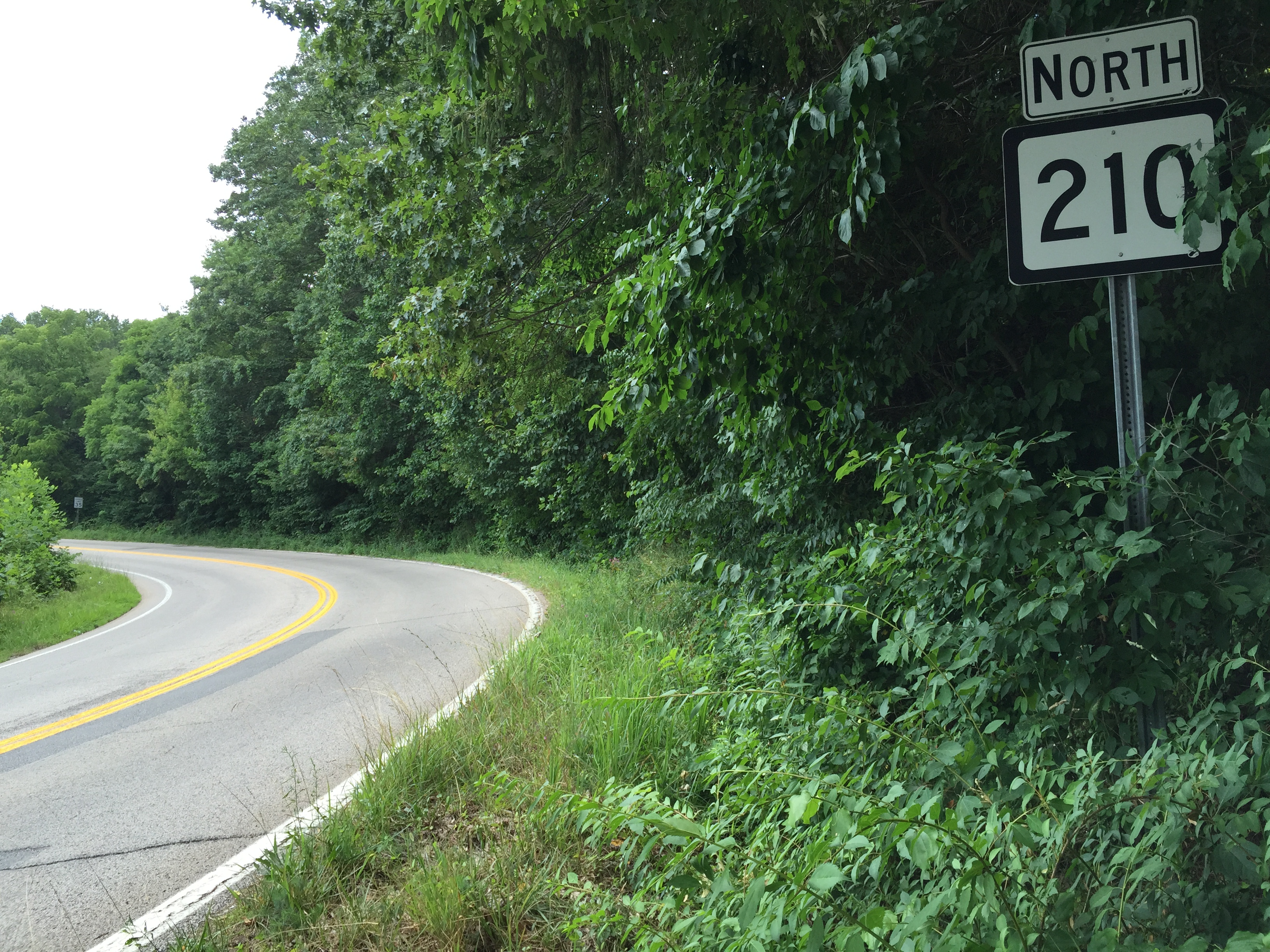
View north along WV 210 at US 19 in Beckley

West Virginia Route 210 is a north–south state highway located entirely within the city of Beckley, West Virginia. The southern terminus of the route is at U.S. Route 19 (former U.S. Route 21) in southeastern Beckley. The northern terminus is at West Virginia Route 16 north of downtown.

== Major intersections ==
The entire route is in Beckley, Raleigh County.

mi	km	Destinations	Notes
		WV 16 (Robert C. Byrd Drive)	
		WV 41 north (Johnstown Road)	
		US 19 to I-64 – Summersville, Hinton, Princeton, Airport	
1.000 mi = 1.609 km; 1.000 km = 0.621 mi
