= Ruth, West Virginia =

- Unincorporated community
- Location within West Virginia Location within the United States
- Coordinates: 38°18′37″N 81°43′41″W
- Country: United States
- State: West Virginia
- County: Kanawha
- Elevation: 689 ft (210 m)
- Time zone: UTC-5 (Eastern (EST))
  - Summer (DST): UTC-4 (EDT)
- Area codes: 304 & 681
- GNIS feature ID: 1546193

Ruth is an unincorporated community in Kanawha County, West Virginia, United States. Ruth is located along U.S. Route 119 and West Virginia Route 214, 6 miles (9.7 km) southwest of Charleston.
