= Maben, West Virginia =

Community in West Virginia, US

Maben
- Unincorporated community
- Location within the state of West Virginia Maben (the United States)
- Coordinates: 37°38′12″N 81°23′31″W
- Country: United States
- State: West Virginia
- County: Wyoming
- Time zone: UTC-5 (Eastern (EST))
  - Summer (DST): UTC-4 (EDT)
- ZIP codes: 25870

Maben is an unincorporated community in Wyoming County, West Virginia, United States, along the Slab Fork and West Virginia Route 54. The community is home to Integrated Resources of Wyoming County.

The community was named after John C. Maben, the original owner of the town site.
