= Surveyor, West Virginia =

- Unincorporated community
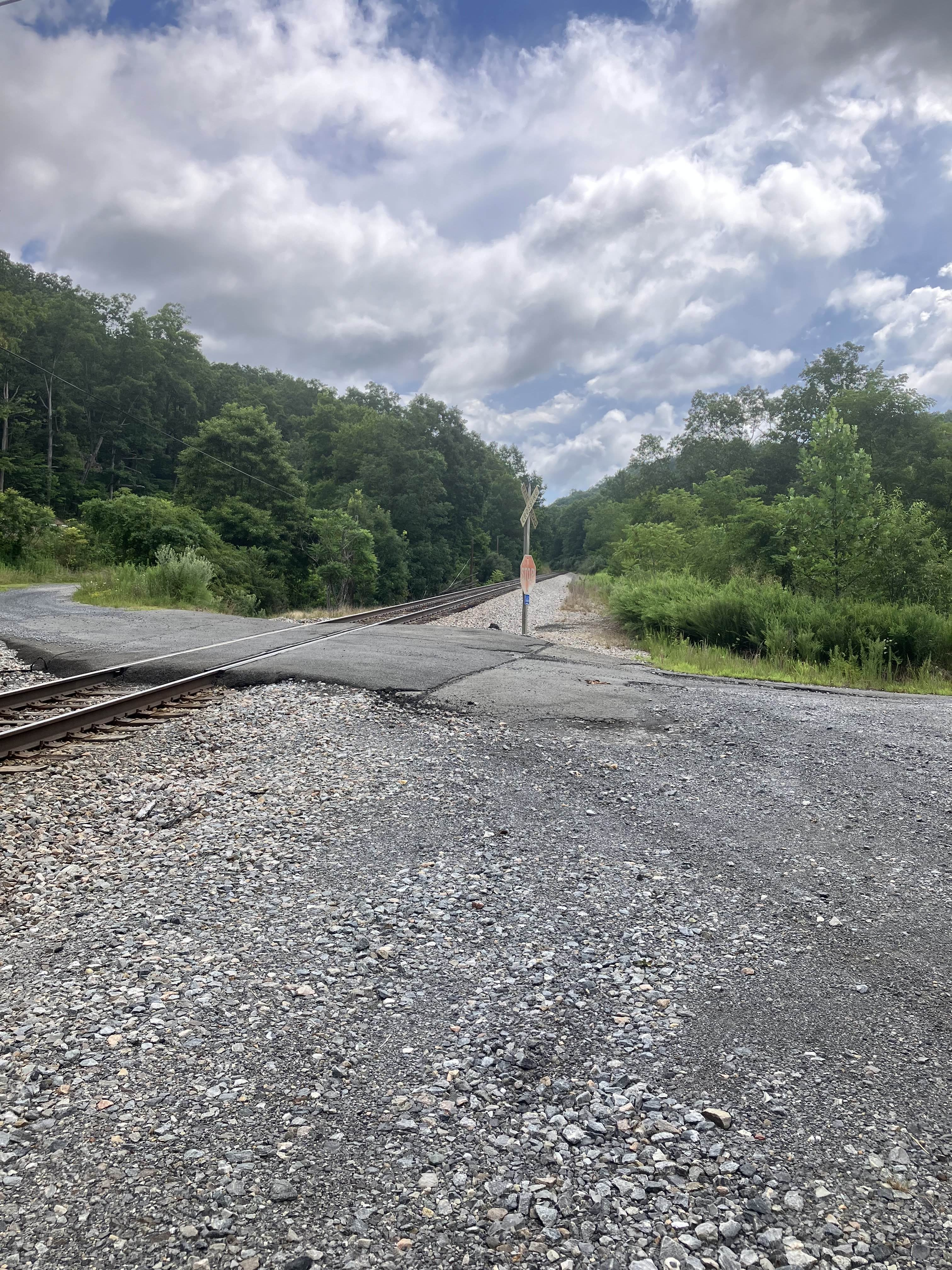
- Railroad tracks in Surveyor, West Virginia

- Location within West Virginia and the United States Surveyor, West Virginia (the United States)
- Coordinates: 37°45′57″N 81°19′04″W
- Country: United States
- State: West Virginia
- County: Raleigh
- Elevation: 1,933 ft (589 m)
- Time zone: UTC-5 (Eastern (EST))
  - Summer (DST): UTC-4 (EDT)
- ZIP code: 25932
- Area codes: 304 & 681
- GNIS feature ID: 1558394

Surveyor is an unincorporated community in Raleigh County, West Virginia, United States. Surveyor is located on West Virginia Route 305, 7 miles (11 km) west of Beckley. Surveyor has a post office with ZIP code 25932.

The community was named after nearby Surveyor Creek.
