= Twin Falls Resort State Park =

State Park in Wyoming County, West Virginia, United States

- IUCN category III (natural monument or feature)
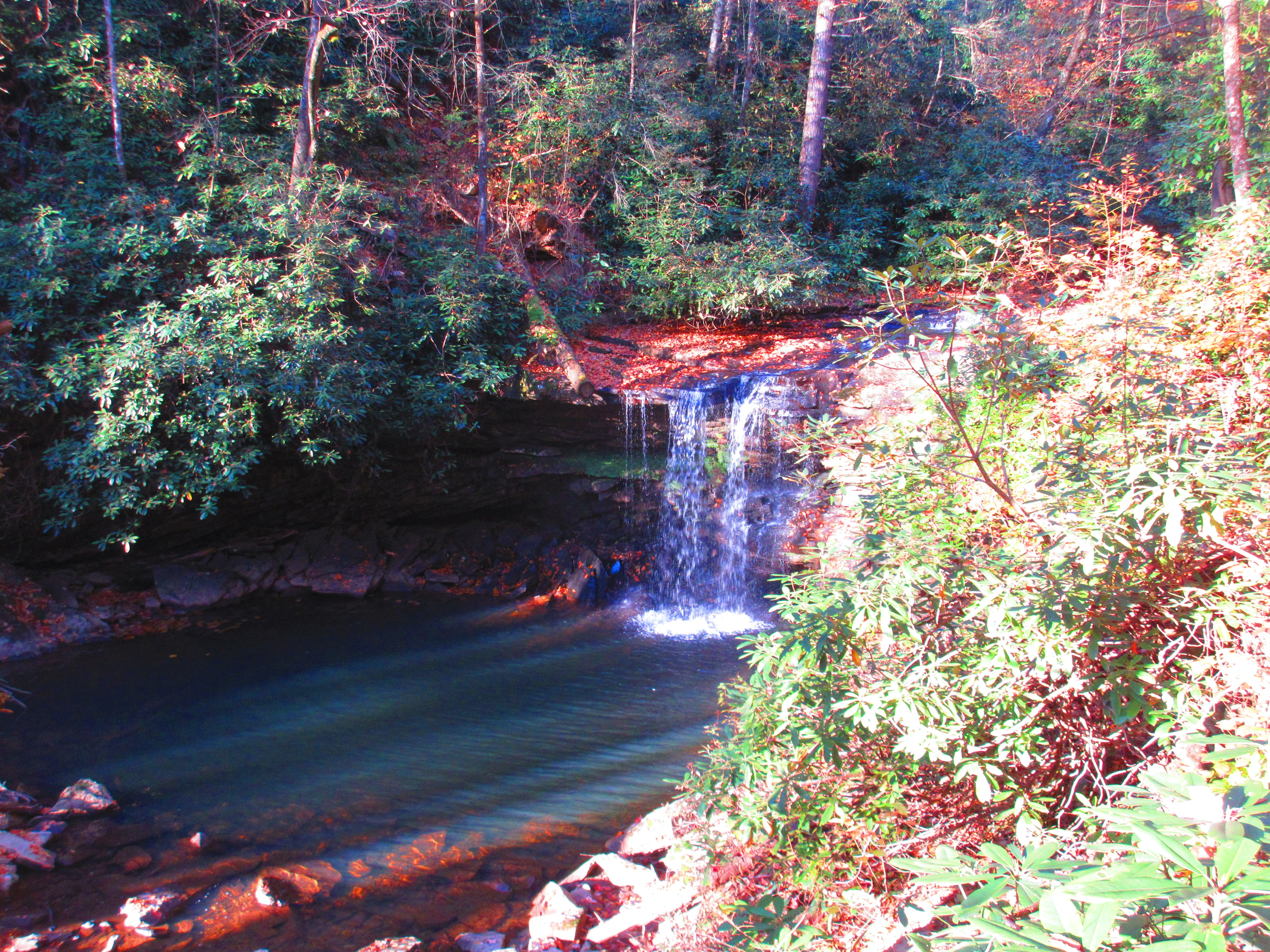
- Marsh Fork Falls, one of the eponymous twin falls, is reached via a paved path

- Location within West Virginia
- Location: Wyoming, West Virginia, United States
- Nearest town: Mullens, West Virginia
- Coordinates: 37°37′25″N 81°27′33″W
- Area: 3,776 acres (15.28 km^{2})
- Elevation: 1,978 ft (603 m)
- Established: 1964
- Governing body: West Virginia Division of Natural Resources
- Website: wvstateparks.com/park/twin-falls-resort-state-park/

Twin Falls State Resort Park is a state park in Wyoming County, West Virginia. The park was opened in 1968 and was completed by 1975. The two namesake waterfalls are accessed by a hiking trail and are located about 1/2-mile apart on the Marsh and Black Forks of Cabin Creek.

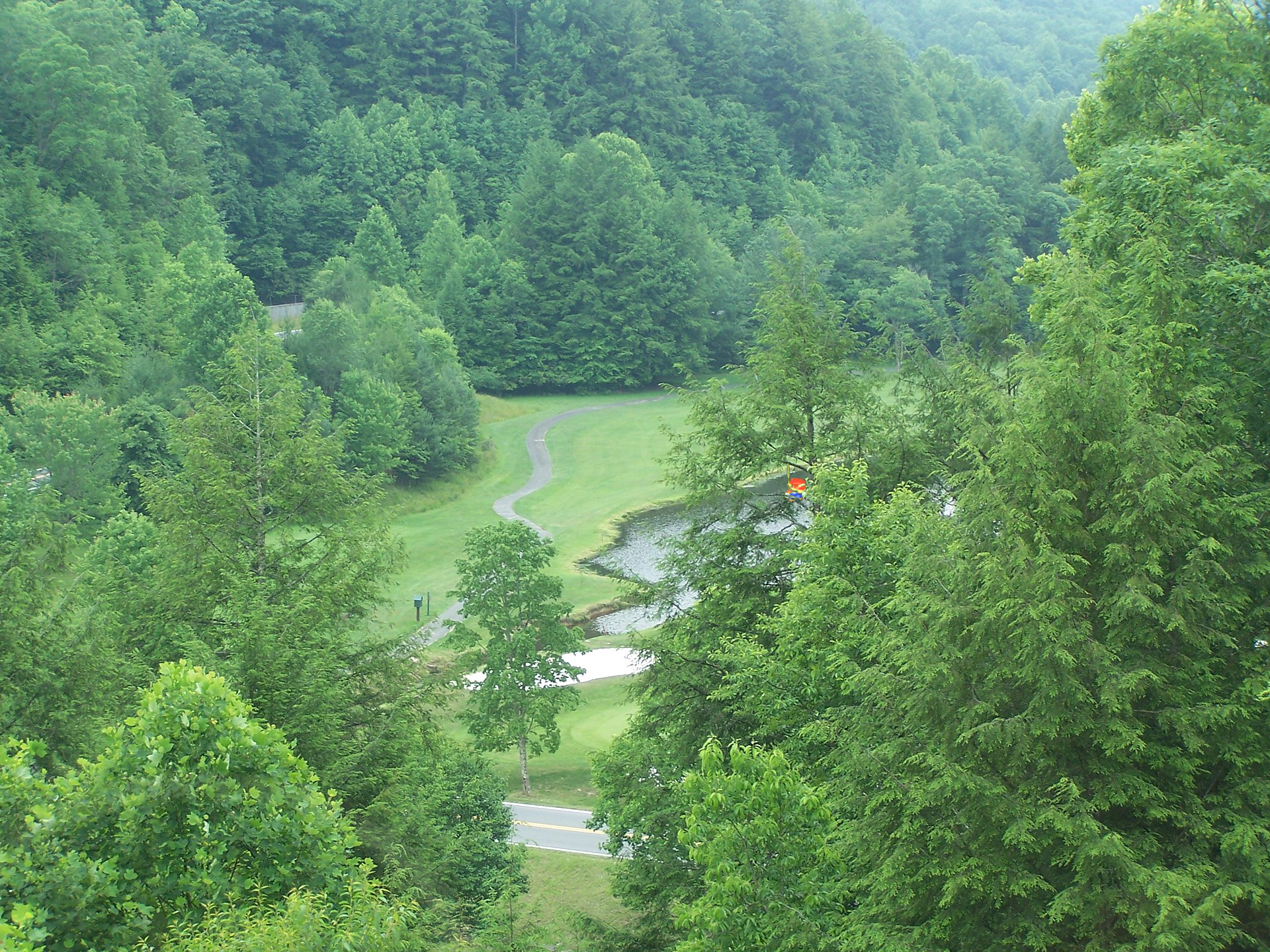
Golf course near the park lodge.

The park is built on land donated by Pocahontas Land Corporation and Western Pocahontas Land Corporation as well as a few small privately owned plots. The entrance to Twin Falls State Park is about 12 miles (19 km) from the Castle Rock Trailhead of the Hatfield–McCoy ATV Trail.

The park's nature center, located in Twin Falls Lodge, features local and natural history displays and offers naturalist-led programs year round.

== Features ==
- Twin Falls Lodge with 47 guest rooms
- 14 cottages
- Restaurant
- Nature center
- Gift shop
- 18 hole golf course
- 50 site campground (25 with RV hook-ups)
- Picnic grounds
- Hiking
- Mountain Biking
- Tennis court
- Basketball court
- Volleyball court
- Indoor Pool Facility
- Fitness Center
- Bowers Ridge Pioneer Farm – a restored 1830s mountain homestead working farm

== See also ==
- List of West Virginia state parks
- State park
