= Bishop, Virginia and West Virginia =

Unincorporated community in West Virginia, United States

Bishop
- Unincorporated community
- Location within West Virginia Location within Virginia Location within the United States
- Coordinates: 37°12′30″N 81°33′36″W
- Country: United States
- State: Virginia and West Virginia
- Counties: Tazewell (VA) and McDowell (WV)
- Time zone: UTC−5 (Eastern (EST))
  - Summer (DST): UTC−4 (EDT)
- ZIP code: 24604
- GNIS feature ID: 1553909

Bishop is an unincorporated community located in McDowell County, West Virginia, and Tazewell County, Virginia, United States. Bishop lies on the Virginia-West Virginia state line at the intersection of West Virginia Route 16 and West Virginia Route 161.
