= MacArthur, West Virginia =

- Census-designated place (CDP)
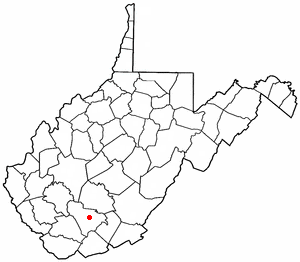
- Location of MacArthur, West Virginia
- Coordinates: 37°45′06″N 81°12′25″W
- Country: United States
- State: West Virginia
- County: Raleigh

Area
  - Total: 3.0 sq mi (7.7 km^{2})
  - Land: 3.0 sq mi (7.7 km^{2})
  - Water: 0 sq mi (0.0 km^{2})
- Elevation: 2,467 ft (752 m)

Population (2020)
  - Total: 1,376
  - Density: 460/sq mi (180/km^{2})
- Time zone: UTC-5 (Eastern (EST))
  - Summer (DST): UTC-4 (EDT)
- ZIP code: 25873
- Area code: 304
- FIPS code: 54-49564
- GNIS feature ID: 2390105

MacArthur is a census-designated place (CDP) in Raleigh County, West Virginia, United States. Originally, it was named Hollywood and renamed MacArthur after General of the Army Douglas MacArthur in 1942. The population was 1,376 at the 2020 census.

== Geography ==
According to the United States Census Bureau, the CDP has a total area of 3.0 square miles (7.7 km^{2}), all land.

== Demographics ==
Historical population
Census	Pop.	Note	%±
2000	1,695		—
2010	1,500		−11.5%
2020	1,376		−8.3%
U.S. Decennial Census

As of the census of 2000, there were 1,695 people, 714 households, and 496 families living in the CDP. The population density was 571.4 people per square mile (220.8/km^{2}). There were 783 housing units at an average density of 264.3/sq mi (102.1/km^{2}). The racial makeup of the CDP was 98.52% White, 0.41% African American, 0.35% Native American, 0.06% Asian, 0.12% Pacific Islander, 0.06% from other races, and 0.47% from two or more races. Hispanic or Latino of any race were 0.71% of the population.

There were 714 households, out of which 28.6% had children under the age of 18 living with them, 57.1% were married couples living together, 9.4% had a female householder with no husband present, and 30.4% were non-families. 26.8% of all households were made up of individuals, and 13.7% had someone living alone who was 65 years of age or older. The average household size was 2.37 and the average family size was 2.87.

In the CDP, the population was spread out, with 22.9% under the age of 18, 6.6% from 18 to 24, 27.5% from 25 to 44, 26.0% from 45 to 64, and 16.9% who were 65 years of age or older. The median age was 40 years. For every 100 females, there were 94.4 males. For every 100 females age 18 and over, there were 89.1 males.

The median income for a household in the CDP was $29,607, and the median income for a family was $34,167. Males had a median income of $31,208 versus $21,346 for females. The per capita income for the CDP was $17,150. About 10.6% of families and 12.3% of the population were below the poverty line, including 18.0% of those under age 18 and 3.1% of those age 65 or over.
