= McAlpin, Harrison County, West Virginia =

- Unincorporated community
- Location within West Virginia Location within the United States
- Coordinates: 39°20′37″N 80°14′13″W
- Country: United States
- State: West Virginia
- County: Harrison
- Elevation: 1,138 ft (347 m)
- Time zone: UTC-5 (Eastern (EST))
  - Summer (DST): UTC-4 (EDT)
- Area codes: 304 & 681
- GNIS feature ID: 1555074

McAlpin is an unincorporated community in Harrison County, West Virginia, United States. McAlpin is located along West Virginia Route 131, 4.1 miles (6.6 km) north-northeast of Bridgeport.
