= Mabscott, West Virginia =

- Town
- Location of Mabscott in Raleigh County, West Virginia.
- Coordinates: 37°46′08″N 81°12′48″W
- Country: United States
- State: West Virginia
- County: Raleigh

Area
  - Total: 0.93 sq mi (2.40 km^{2})
  - Land: 0.93 sq mi (2.40 km^{2})
  - Water: 0 sq mi (0.00 km^{2})
- Elevation: 2,336 ft (712 m)

Population (2020)
  - Total: 1,341
  - Estimate (2021): 1,313
  - Density: 1,365.2/sq mi (527.09/km^{2})
- Time zone: UTC-5 (Eastern (EST))
  - Summer (DST): UTC-4 (EDT)
- ZIP code: 25871
- Area code: 304
- FIPS code: 54-49492
- GNIS feature ID: 2391280
- Website: local.wv.gov/Mabscott/Pages/default.aspx

Mabscott is a town in Raleigh County, West Virginia, United States. The population was 1,333 at the 2020 census.

The Chesapeake & Ohio Railway built Beckley Station in what is now Mabscott. Later a new depot was built and the old Beckley Station was renamed Mabscott in 1907.

Mabscott is named for Mabel Shinn Scott, wife of Cyrus Ellison Scott, a chemist who worked in the coal industry. Cyrus and Mabel were married in 1903 in Marion County, W.Va.

Books and newspaper articles have erroneously cited Cyrus Hall Scott as the husband of Mabel Shinn Scott and source of the community name. Cyrus H. Scott was married to Fannie I. Logan and, after Fannie's death, to her sister Emma Crawford Logan.

== Geography ==
According to the United States Census Bureau, the town has a total area of 0.87 square miles (2.25 km^{2}), all land.

== Demographics ==
Historical population
Census	Pop.	Note	%±
1910	561		—
1920	1,114		98.6%
1930	1,260		13.1%
1940	1,473		16.9%
1950	1,665		13.0%
1960	1,591		−4.4%
1970	1,254		−21.2%
1980	1,668		33.0%
1990	1,543		−7.5%
2000	1,403		−9.1%
2010	1,408		0.4%
2020	1,341		−4.8%
2021 (est.)	1,313	▼	−2.1%
U.S. Decennial Census

=== 2010 census ===
At the 2010 census there were 1,408 people, 579 households, and 419 families living in the town. The population density was 1,618.4 inhabitants per square mile (624.9/km^{2}). There were 649 housing units at an average density of 746.0 per square mile (288.0/km^{2}). The racial makeup of the town was 91.8% White, 5.1% African American, 0.2% Native American, 0.1% Asian, 0.1% from other races, and 2.7% from two or more races. Hispanic or Latino of any race were 1.0%.

Of the 579 households 32.6% had children under the age of 18 living with them, 50.4% were married couples living together, 17.8% had a female householder with no husband present, 4.1% had a male householder with no wife present, and 27.6% were non-families. 24.4% of households were one person and 10.2% were one person aged 65 or older. The average household size was 2.43 and the average family size was 2.85.

The median age in the town was 42 years. 23.9% of residents were under the age of 18; 7.6% were between the ages of 18 and 24; 22.5% were from 25 to 44; 31.1% were from 45 to 64; and 15.1% were 65 or older. The gender makeup of the town was 46.2% male and 53.8% female.

=== 2000 census ===
At the 2000 census there were 1,403 people, 581 households, and 428 families living in the town. The population density was 1,548.8 inhabitants per square mile (595.3/km^{2}). There were 627 housing units at an average density of 692.2 per square mile (266.0/km^{2}). The racial makeup of the town was 93.59% White, 5.27% African American, 0.14% Asian, 0.50% from other races, and 0.50% from two or more races. Hispanic or Latino of any race were 0.43%.

Of the 581 households 30.3% had children under the age of 18 living with them, 57.0% were married couples living together, 13.9% had a female householder with no husband present, and 26.3% were non-families. 23.6% of households were one person and 12.7% were one person aged 65 or older. The average household size was 2.41 and the average family size was 2.82.

The age distribution was 23.2% under the age of 18, 7.8% from 18 to 24, 25.8% from 25 to 44, 26.9% from 45 to 64, and 16.3% 65 or older. The median age was 41 years. For every 100 females, there were 88.6 males. For every 100 females age 18 and over, there were 87.0 males.

The median household income was $28,021 and the median family income was $38,472. Males had a median income of $33,125 versus $22,500 for females. The per capita income for the town was $15,638. About 19.4% of families and 24.2% of the population were below the poverty line, including 37.1% of those under age 18 and 11.3% of those age 65 or over.
