= West Virginia Route 54 =

State highway in West Virginia, United States

West Virginia Route 54

Route information
- Maintained by WVDOH
- Length: 18.6 mi (29.9 km)

Major junctions
- South end: WV 16 in Mullens
- WV 97 from Maben to Sophia
- North end: WV 16 / WV 97 near Sophia

Location
- Country: United States
- State: West Virginia
- Counties: Wyoming, Raleigh

Highway system
- West Virginia State Highway System; Interstate; US; State
← WV 53	→ WV 55

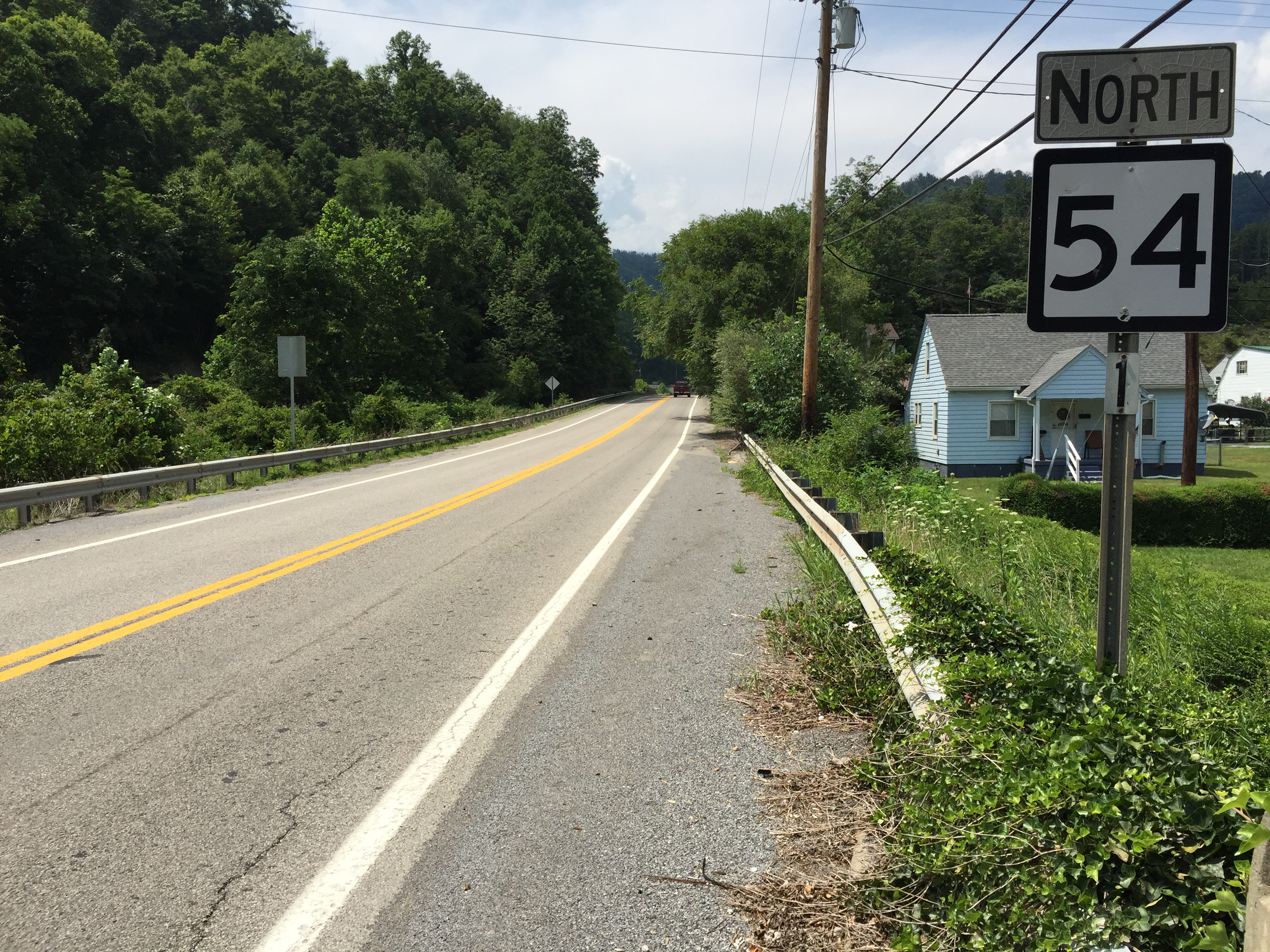
View north along WV 54 in Mullens

West Virginia Route 54 is a north–south state highway located in southern West Virginia. The southern terminus of the route is at West Virginia Route 16 in Mullens. The northern terminus is at WV 16 and West Virginia Route 97 in Sophia.

== Major intersections ==
County	Location	mi	km	Destinations	Notes
Wyoming	Mullens			WV 16 – Sophia, Pineville	
Wyoming	Maben			WV 97 west – Pineville, Welch	south end of WV 97 overlap
Raleigh	Lester			WV 305 north	
Raleigh				WV 16 north / WV 121 south – Beckley	interchange
Raleigh				WV 16 / WV 97 east – Beckley, Sophia	north end of WV 97 overlap
1.000 mi = 1.609 km; 1.000 km = 0.621 mi: Concurrency terminus
