= Hanover, West Virginia =

Community in West Virginia, US

Hanover
- Unincorporated community
- Location within the state of West Virginia Hanover (the United States)
- Coordinates: 37°34′21″N 81°47′58″W
- Country: United States
- State: West Virginia
- County: Wyoming
- Time zone: UTC-5 (Eastern (EST))
  - Summer (DST): UTC-4 (EDT)
- ZIP codes: 24839
- GNIS feature ID: 1554642

Hanover is an unincorporated community in Wyoming County, West Virginia, United States.

== Notable people ==
- Jamie Noble, professional wrestler
