= Mullens, West Virginia =

City in West Virginia, US

- City
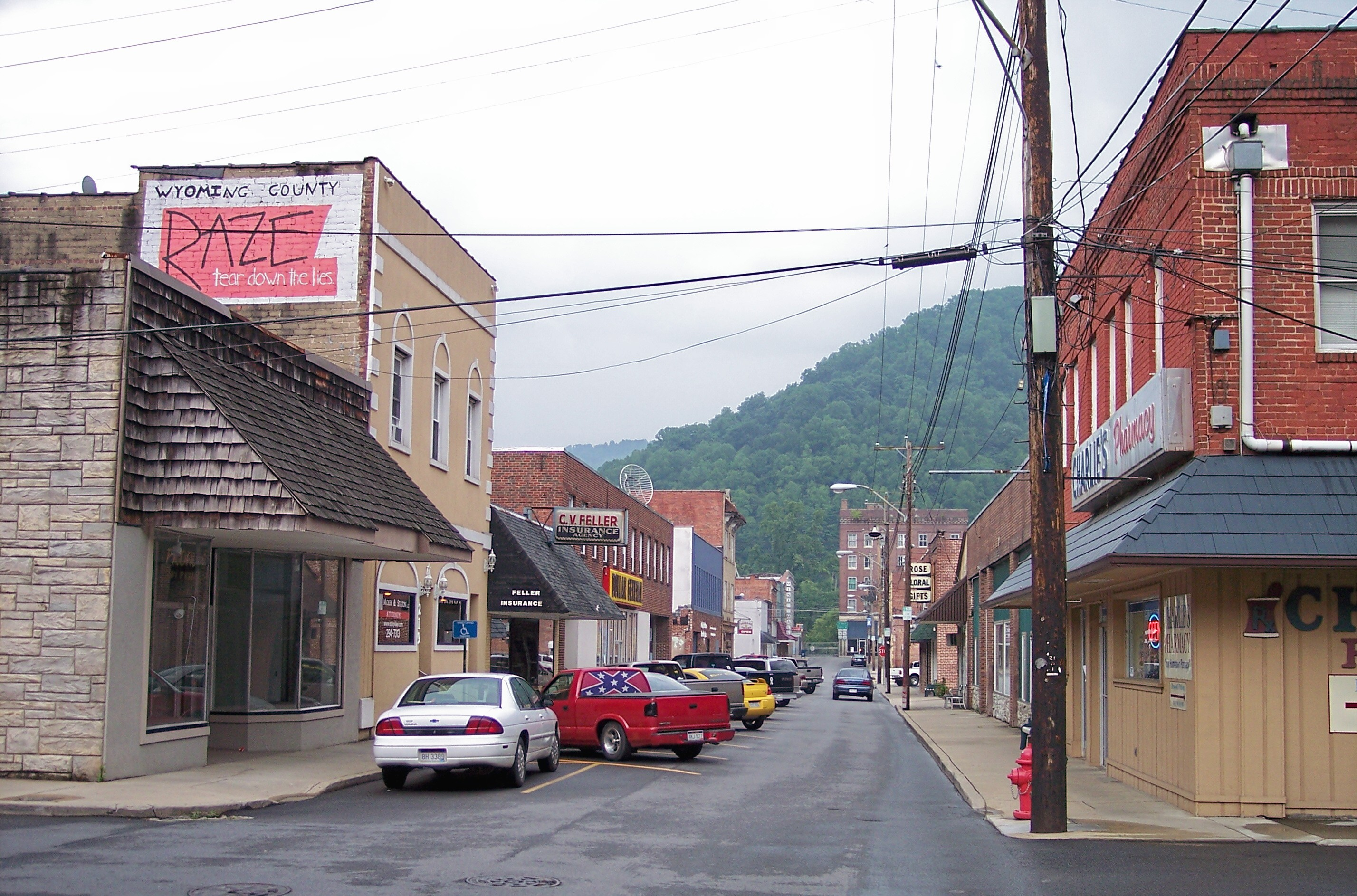
- Howard Avenue in downtown Mullens in 2007

- Location of Mullens in Wyoming County, West Virginia.
- Coordinates: 37°35′5″N 81°23′5″W
- Country: United States
- State: West Virginia
- County: Wyoming
- Incorporated: 1912
- Chartered: 1929

Area
  - Total: 1.90 sq mi (4.91 km^{2})
  - Land: 1.84 sq mi (4.77 km^{2})
  - Water: 0.054 sq mi (0.14 km^{2})
- Elevation: 1,417 ft (432 m)

Population (2020)
  - Total: 1,480
  - Estimate (2021): 1,445
  - Density: 719/sq mi (277.7/km^{2})
- Time zone: UTC-5 (Eastern (EST))
  - Summer (DST): UTC-4 (EDT)
- ZIP code: 25882
- Area code: 304
- FIPS code: 54-57148
- GNIS feature ID: 1543986
- Website: www.mullenswv.com

Mullens is a city in Wyoming County, West Virginia. The population was 1,475 at the time of the 2020 census.

Located in a valley along the Guyandotte River within a mountainous region of southern West Virginia, the town was nearly destroyed by flash flooding in July 2001. While the town has attempted to redevelop with the aid of state and federal recovery money, many local businesses and residents have left the area permanently.

Each spring, Mullens hosts the Dogwood Festival, a community celebration held at the end of April. The festival includes a parade through downtown, food and craft vendors, car shows, live music, and other family-oriented activities.

== History ==
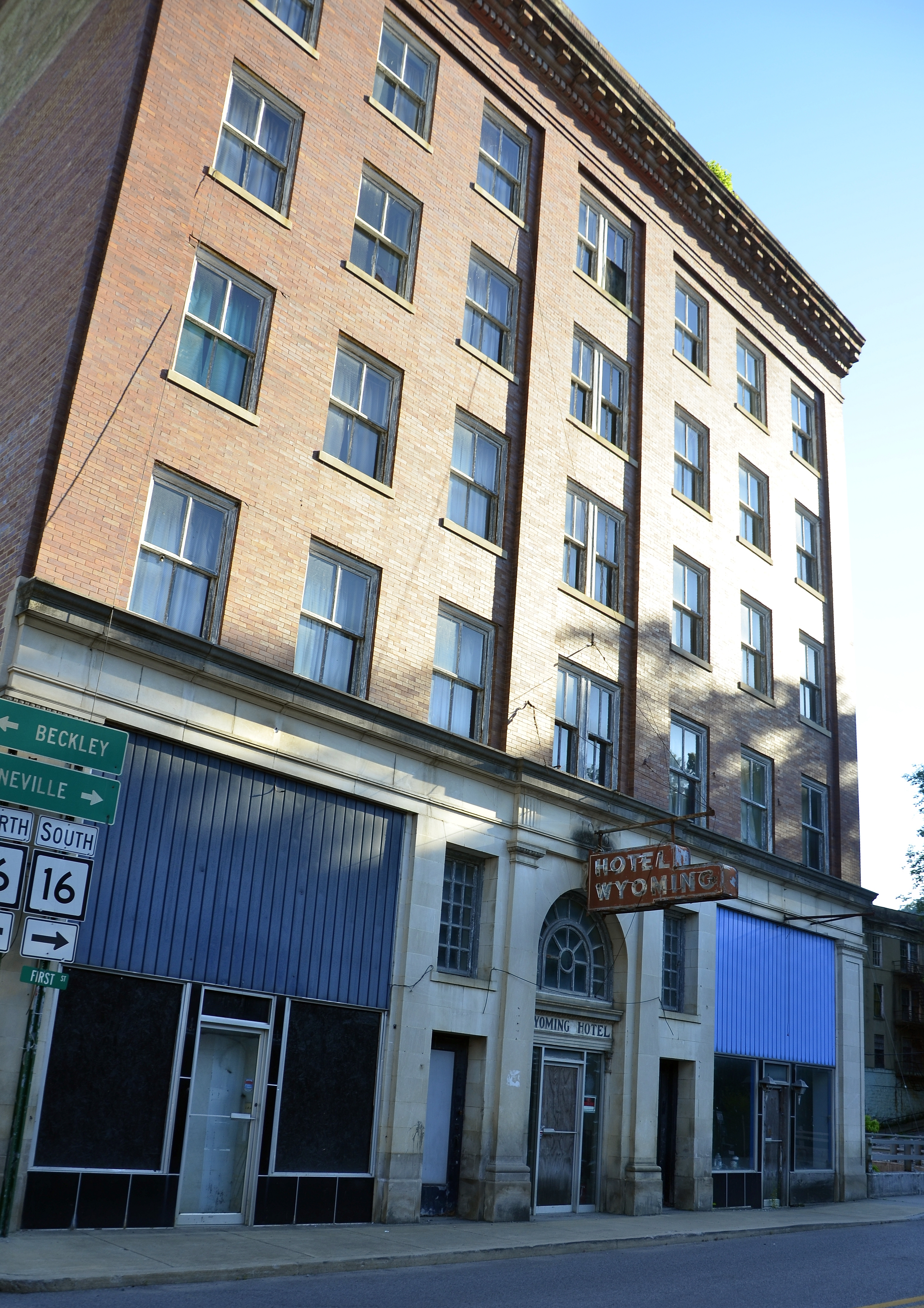
Wyoming Hotel

Mullens was incorporated as a town on September 17, 1912, and operated under a charter issued by the Circuit Court of Wyoming County. It was named for A. J. Mullins, who owned the land upon which the town is built. The town's original name was spelled with an "i"; a recording error accounts for the error in spelling, which was never corrected. An Act of the West Virginia Legislature granting a charter to the City of Mullens was passed February 22, 1929.

The early growth of the Mullens community came with development of the lumber and coal mining industries. In the early 20th century, coal-mining manager and developer William Nelson Page of Ansted helped open the Winding Gulf Coalfield with plans for the Deepwater Railway, a new short-line railroad. When Page ran into competitive collusion by the bigger railroads which would have wrecked his project, backed by his silent partner, wealthy industrialist Henry Huttleston Rogers, the plan was expanded in a secretive and massive way to build a line all the way east to the port of Hampton Roads.

Completed in 1909, the Virginian Railway (VGN) established engine terminal and yard facilities near Mullens which employed hundreds of workers during the first half of the 20th century. The VGN was merged with the Norfolk and Western Railway (N&W) in 1959, and both later became part of the Norfolk Southern Railway (NS). A caboose museum in Mullens celebrates the history of the railroad in the region.

The Mullens Historic District was listed on the National Register of Historic Places in 1993. The nearby Wyco Church was listed in 2010.

A Beckley to Mullens section of State Route 121, the Coalfields Expressway, was opened on October 1, 2020 and dedicated in a ceremony by Governor Jim Justice.

== Geography ==
Mullens is located at the confluence of the Guyandotte River and the Slab Fork.

According to the United States Census Bureau, the city has a total area of 1.85 square miles (4.79 km^{2}), of which 1.80 square miles (4.66 km^{2}) is land and 0.05 square miles (0.13 km^{2}) is water.

=== Climate ===
The climate in this area has mild differences between highs and lows, and there is adequate rainfall year-round. According to the Köppen Climate Classification system, Mullens has a marine west coast climate, abbreviated "Cfb" on climate maps.

Climate data for Mullens, West Virginia, 1991–2020 normals, extremes 1990–present
Month	Jan	Feb	Mar	Apr	May	Jun	Jul	Aug	Sep	Oct	Nov	Dec	Year
Record high °F (°C)	76 (24)	81 (27)	88 (31)	92 (33)	94 (34)	100 (38)	99 (37)	97 (36)	99 (37)	93 (34)	84 (29)	78 (26)	100 (38)
Mean maximum °F (°C)	66.2 (19.0)	69.1 (20.6)	77.3 (25.2)	86.3 (30.2)	88.4 (31.3)	91.3 (32.9)	92.8 (33.8)	91.3 (32.9)	89.2 (31.8)	83.0 (28.3)	76.1 (24.5)	67.0 (19.4)	93.9 (34.4)
Mean daily maximum °F (°C)	42.7 (5.9)	46.9 (8.3)	55.9 (13.3)	68.3 (20.2)	75.7 (24.3)	82.0 (27.8)	85.1 (29.5)	83.7 (28.7)	78.4 (25.8)	68.0 (20.0)	56.5 (13.6)	46.3 (7.9)	65.8 (18.8)
Daily mean °F (°C)	32.6 (0.3)	35.7 (2.1)	43.0 (6.1)	53.5 (11.9)	62.3 (16.8)	69.8 (21.0)	73.5 (23.1)	72.2 (22.3)	66.2 (19.0)	54.6 (12.6)	43.7 (6.5)	36.2 (2.3)	53.6 (12.0)
Mean daily minimum °F (°C)	22.4 (−5.3)	24.4 (−4.2)	30.1 (−1.1)	38.6 (3.7)	48.9 (9.4)	57.5 (14.2)	61.9 (16.6)	60.8 (16.0)	54.1 (12.3)	41.3 (5.2)	30.8 (−0.7)	26.2 (−3.2)	41.4 (5.2)
Mean minimum °F (°C)	4.0 (−15.6)	8.5 (−13.1)	15.4 (−9.2)	26.1 (−3.3)	35.9 (2.2)	47.3 (8.5)	54.6 (12.6)	52.8 (11.6)	42.4 (5.8)	28.9 (−1.7)	19.1 (−7.2)	11.9 (−11.2)	1.2 (−17.1)
Record low °F (°C)	−14 (−26)	−17 (−27)	−4 (−20)	20 (−7)	29 (−2)	40 (4)	48 (9)	42 (6)	32 (0)	22 (−6)	7 (−14)	1 (−17)	−17 (−27)
Average precipitation inches (mm)	3.90 (99)	3.50 (89)	4.50 (114)	4.22 (107)	5.05 (128)	4.50 (114)	5.53 (140)	4.20 (107)	3.11 (79)	2.94 (75)	3.13 (80)	4.06 (103)	48.64 (1,235)
Average snowfall inches (cm)	8.8 (22)	5.1 (13)	2.4 (6.1)	0.1 (0.25)	0.0 (0.0)	0.0 (0.0)	0.0 (0.0)	0.0 (0.0)	0.0 (0.0)	0.0 (0.0)	0.5 (1.3)	3.2 (8.1)	20.1 (50.75)
Average precipitation days (≥ 0.01 in)	13.1	11.8	13.0	12.6	14.3	13.1	13.0	11.4	9.5	10.5	10.3	13.1	145.7
Average snowy days (≥ 0.1 in)	5.2	2.6	1.0	0.1	0.0	0.0	0.0	0.0	0.0	0.0	0.4	1.9	11.2
Source 1: NOAA
Source 2: National Weather Service

== Demographics ==
Historical population
Census	Pop.	Note	%±
1920	1,425		—
1930	2,356		65.3%
1940	3,026		28.4%
1950	3,470		14.7%
1960	3,544		2.1%
1970	2,967		−16.3%
1980	2,919		−1.6%
1990	2,006		−31.3%
2000	1,769		−11.8%
2010	1,559		−11.9%
2020	1,480		−5.1%
2021 (est.)	1,445		−2.4%
U.S. Decennial Census

=== 2020 census ===
As of the 2020 census, Mullens had a population of 1,480. The median age was 41.9 years. 22.3% of residents were under the age of 18 and 19.6% of residents were 65 years of age or older. For every 100 females there were 95.8 males, and for every 100 females age 18 and over there were 92.0 males age 18 and over.

0.0% of residents lived in urban areas, while 100.0% lived in rural areas.

There were 594 households in Mullens, of which 31.0% had children under the age of 18 living in them. Of all households, 44.8% were married-couple households, 19.5% were households with a male householder and no spouse or partner present, and 28.8% were households with a female householder and no spouse or partner present. About 30.6% of all households were made up of individuals and 17.0% had someone living alone who was 65 years of age or older.

There were 787 housing units, of which 24.5% were vacant. The homeowner vacancy rate was 4.0% and the rental vacancy rate was 13.2%.

Racial composition as of the 2020 census
Race	Number	Percent
White	1,375	92.9%
Black or African American	30	2.0%
American Indian and Alaska Native	4	0.3%
Asian	6	0.4%
Native Hawaiian and Other Pacific Islander	0	0.0%
Some other race	4	0.3%
Two or more races	61	4.1%
Hispanic or Latino (of any race)	15	1.0%

=== 2010 census ===
As of the census of 2010, there were 1,559 people, 682 households, and 409 families living in the city. The population density was 866.1 inhabitants per square mile (334.4/km^{2}). There were 837 housing units at an average density of 465.0 per square mile (179.5/km^{2}). The racial makeup of the city was 96.5% White, 2.2% African American, 0.1% Native American, 0.2% from other races, and 1.0% from two or more races. Hispanic or Latino of any race were 0.1% of the population.

There were 682 households, of which 27.7% had children under the age of 18 living with them, 45.0% were married couples living together, 9.4% had a female householder with no husband present, 5.6% had a male householder with no wife present, and 40.0% were non-families. 36.4% of all households were made up of individuals, and 18% had someone living alone who was 65 years of age or older. The average household size was 2.29 and the average family size was 3.01.

The median age in the city was 41.7 years. 22.5% of residents were under the age of 18; 7.8% were between the ages of 18 and 24; 24.1% were from 25 to 44; 27.5% were from 45 to 64; and 18.2% were 65 years of age or older. The gender makeup of the city was 48.8% male and 51.2% female.

=== 2000 census ===
As of the census of 2000, there were 1,769 people, 771 households, and 502 families living in the city. The population density was 927.5 people per square mile (357.6/km^{2}). There were 904 housing units at an average density of 474.0 per square mile (182.7/km^{2}). The racial makeup of the city was 95.03% White, 3.45% African American, 0.06% Native American, 0.51% Asian, and 0.96% from two or more races. Hispanic or Latino of any race were 0.17% of the population.

There were 771 households, out of which 25.7% had children under the age of 18 living with them, 51.9% were married couples living together, 9.6% had a female householder with no husband present, and 34.8% were non-families. 32.6% of all households were made up of individuals, and 19.6% had someone living alone who was 65 years of age or older. The average household size was 2.24 and the average family size was 2.83.

In the city, the population was spread out, with 20.0% under the age of 18, 8.4% from 18 to 24, 24.4% from 25 to 44, 25.2% from 45 to 64, and 22.0% who were 65 years of age or older. The median age was 43 years. For every 100 females, there were 97.0 males. For every 100 females age 18 and over, there were 89.6 males.

The median income for a household in the city was $27,742, and the median income for a family was $37,438. Males had a median income of $32,197 versus $20,917 for females. The per capita income for the city was $17,314. About 11.9% of families and 15.4% of the population were below the poverty line, including 22.5% of those under age 18 and 9.4% of those age 65 or over.

== Transportation ==
=== Highways ===
- West Virginia Route 16
- West Virginia Route 54
- West Virginia Route 121

== Notable people ==
- Jerome Anderson, basketball player and coach
- Mike D'Antoni, a former basketball player and current NBA basketball coach
- Dan D'Antoni, current head men's basketball coach at Marshall University
- Christy Martin, professional female boxer
- David Stover, member of the West Virginia Senate
- Rick Tolley, Marshall University head football coach killed in the Southern Airways Flight 932 airplane crash
