= Lester, West Virginia =

- Town
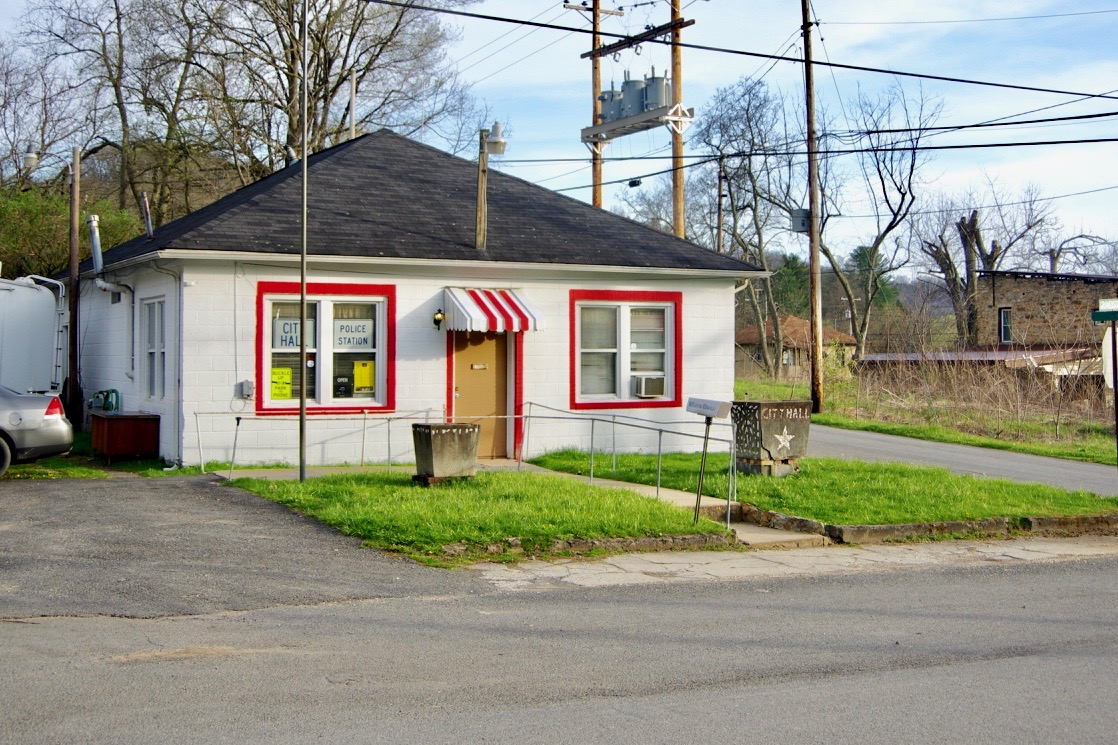
- City Hall in Lester

- Logo

- Location of Lester in Raleigh County, West Virginia.
- Coordinates: 37°44′06″N 81°18′05″W
- Country: United States
- State: West Virginia
- County: Raleigh

Area
  - Total: 0.50 sq mi (1.30 km^{2})
  - Land: 0.50 sq mi (1.30 km^{2})
  - Water: 0 sq mi (0.00 km^{2})
- Elevation: 2,031 ft (619 m)

Population (2020)
  - Total: 338
  - Estimate (2021): 333
  - Density: 626.4/sq mi (241.86/km^{2})
- Time zone: UTC-5 (Eastern (EST))
  - Summer (DST): UTC-4 (EDT)
- ZIP code: 25865
- Area code: 304
- FIPS code: 54-46468
- GNIS feature ID: 2391270

Lester is a town in Raleigh County, West Virginia, United States. The population was 337 at the 2020 census. The community was named after Champ Lester, a local pioneer.

== Geography ==
Lester is located at 37°44′5″N 81°18′4″W (37.734740, -81.300985). The town is situated along Surveyor Creek, which is part of the Coal River watershed, and is concentrated around the intersection of state routes 97 and 305. The latter highway connects the town with the Beckley area a few miles to the east.

According to the United States Census Bureau, the town has a total area of 0.50 square miles (1.29 km^{2}), all land.

== Demographics ==
Historical population
Census	Pop.	Note	%±
1920	412		—
1930	609		47.8%
1940	909		49.3%
1950	780		−14.2%
1960	626		−19.7%
1970	507		−19.0%
1980	626		23.5%
1990	420		−32.9%
2000	322		−23.3%
2010	348		8.1%
2020	338		−2.9%
2021 (est.)	333	▼	−1.5%
U.S. Decennial Census

=== 2010 census ===
At the 2010 census there were 348 people, 143 households, and 95 families living in the town. The population density was 696.0 inhabitants per square mile (268.7/km^{2}). There were 175 housing units at an average density of 350.0 units per square mile (135.1 units/km^{2}). The racial makeup of the town was 83.9% White, 13.8% African American, 0.3% Native American, and 2.0% from two or more races. Hispanic or Latino of any race were 0.3%.

Of the 143 households 31.5% had children under the age of 18 living with them, 51.0% were married couples living together, 8.4% had a female householder with no husband present, 7.0% had a male householder with no wife present, and 33.6% were non-families. 28.7% of households were one person and 15.4% were one person aged 65 or older. The average household size was 2.43 and the average family size was 2.89.

The median age in the town was 40.1 years. 25.3% of residents were under the age of 18; 6.3% were between the ages of 18 and 24; 25% were from 25 to 44; 25.3% were from 45 to 64; and 18.1% were 65 or older. The gender makeup of the town was 49.1% male and 50.9% female.

=== 2000 census ===
At the 2000 census there were 322 people, 142 households, and 89 families living in the town. The population density was 650.5 inhabitants per square mile (251.2 inhabitants/km^{2}). There were 168 housing units at an average density of 339.4 units per square mile (131.0 units/km^{2}). The racial makeup of the town was 79.81% White, 19.88% African American, and 0.31% from two or more races. Of the 142 households 23.9% had children under the age of 18 living with them, 47.2% were married couples living together, 11.3% had a female householder with no husband present, and 37.3% were non-families. 33.1% of households were one person and 19.0% were one person aged 65 or older. The average household size was 2.27 and the average family size was 2.91.

The age distribution was 20.2% under the age of 18, 9.3% from 18 to 24, 26.1% from 25 to 44, 27.3% from 45 to 64, and 17.1% 65 or older. The median age was 42 years. For every 100 females, there were 86.1 males. For every 100 females age 18 and over, there were 79.7 males.

The median household income was $24,375 and the median family income was $30,938. Males had a median income of $25,208 versus $18,125 for females. The per capita income for the town was $11,026. About 14.6% of families and 15.7% of the population were below the poverty line, including 19.7% of those under age 18 and 19.7% of those age 65 or over.
