= West Virginia Route 122 =

State highway in West Virginia, United States

West Virginia Route 122

Route information
- Maintained by WVDOH
- Length: 13.2 mi (21.2 km)

Major junctions
- West end: WV 12 in Forest Hill
- East end: US 219 near Rock Camp

Location
- Country: United States
- State: West Virginia
- Counties: Summers, Monroe

Highway system
- West Virginia State Highway System; Interstate; US; State
← US 121	→ WV 123

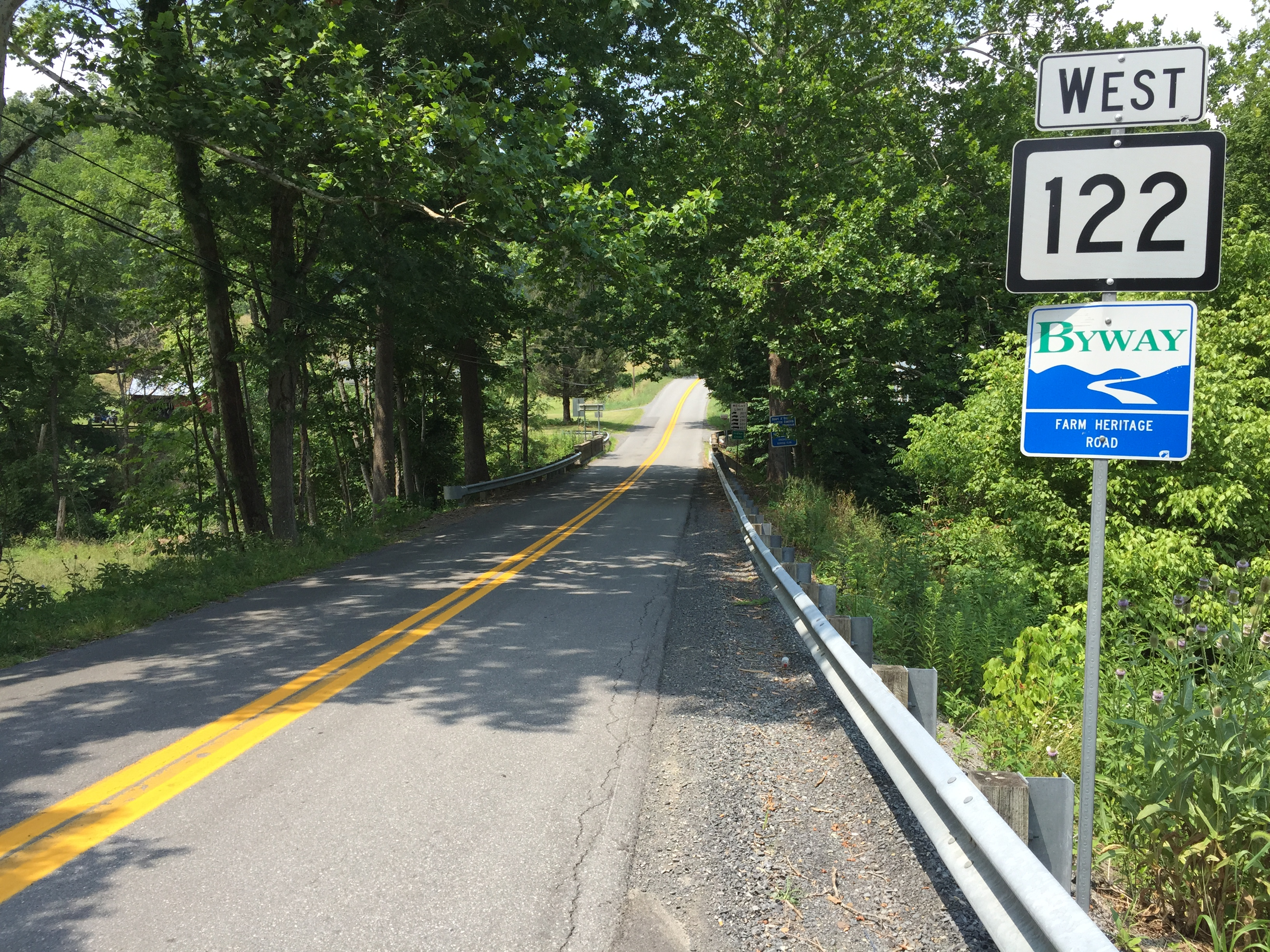
View west along WV 122 at US 219 in Raines Corner

West Virginia Route 122 is an east–west state highway located in southern West Virginia. The western terminus of the route is at West Virginia Route 12 in Forest Hill. The eastern terminus is at U.S. Route 219 north of Rock Camp.

== Major intersections ==
County	Location	mi	km	Destinations	Notes
Summers	Forest Hill			WV 12	
Monroe	Raines Corner			US 219 – Lewisburg, Rich Creek, VA	
1.000 mi = 1.609 km; 1.000 km = 0.621 mi
