= Riffe, West Virginia =

- Unincorporated community
- Location within West Virginia Location within the United States
- Coordinates: 37°40′36″N 80°41′10″W
- Country: United States
- State: West Virginia
- County: Summers
- Elevation: 1,545 ft (471 m)
- Time zone: UTC-5 (Eastern (EST))
  - Summer (DST): UTC-4 (EDT)
- Area codes: 304 & 681
- GNIS feature ID: 1549897

Riffe is an unincorporated community in Summers County, West Virginia, United States. The community is located along the Greenbrier River, about 6 miles (9.7 km) southwest of Alderson and 16 miles (26 km) east of Hinton. Riffe is served by West Virginia Route 3 and West Virginia Route 12.
