= Frazier, West Virginia =

Unincorporated community in West Virginia, United States

- Unincorporated community
- Location within West Virginia Location within the United States
- Coordinates: 37°44′28″N 80°33′46″W
- Country: United States
- State: West Virginia
- County: Greenbrier
- Elevation: 1,621 ft (494 m)
- Time zone: UTC-5 (Eastern (EST))
  - Summer (DST): UTC-4 (EDT)
- Area codes: 304 & 681
- GNIS feature ID: 1549691

Frazier is an unincorporated community in Greenbrier County, West Virginia, United States. Frazier is located on West Virginia Route 63, 5.5 miles (8.9 km) west of Ronceverte. Attractions include the Greenbrier River and the nearby Greenbrier River Campground.
