= Griffith Creek, West Virginia =

- Unincorporated community
- Location within West Virginia Location within the United States
- Coordinates: 37°43′39″N 80°40′35″W
- Country: United States
- State: West Virginia
- County: Summers
- Elevation: 1,555 ft (474 m)
- Time zone: UTC-5 (Eastern (EST))
  - Summer (DST): UTC-4 (EDT)
- Area codes: 304 & 681
- GNIS feature ID: 1556919

Griffith Creek is an unincorporated community in Summers County, West Virginia, United States. Griffith Creek is located along the Greenbrier River and West Virginia routes 3 and 12, west of Alderson.

== History ==
Griffith Creek was named for an early settler who had been abducted as a child by Indians, and whose father had been killed by Indians.
