= Interstate 64 in West Virginia =

Highway in West Virginia

Interstate 64
- I-64 highlighted in red

Route information
- Maintained by WVDOH and WV Parkways Authority
- Length: 188.75 mi (303.76 km)
- Existed: 1956–present
- NHS: Entire route

Major junctions
- West end: I-64 at the Kentucky state line in Kenova
- US 52 in Kenova; US 35 in Scott Depot; US 119 in Charleston; I-77 in Charleston; US 60 in Charleston; US 19 in Prosperity; I-77 near Beckley; US 60 near Sam Black Church; US 219 in Lewisburg
- East end: I-64 / US 60 at the Virginia state line in White Sulphur Springs

Location
- Country: United States
- State: West Virginia
- Counties: Wayne, Cabell, Putnam, Kanawha, Fayette, Raleigh, Summers, Greenbrier

Highway system
- Interstate Highway System; Main; Auxiliary; Suffixed; Business; Future; West Virginia State Highway System; Interstate; US; State
← WV 63	→ WV 65

Interstate 64 (I-64) is an Interstate Highway in the US state of West Virginia. It travels east–west through the state for 189 miles (304 km) passing by the major towns and cities of Huntington, Charleston, Beckley, and Lewisburg.

== Route description ==
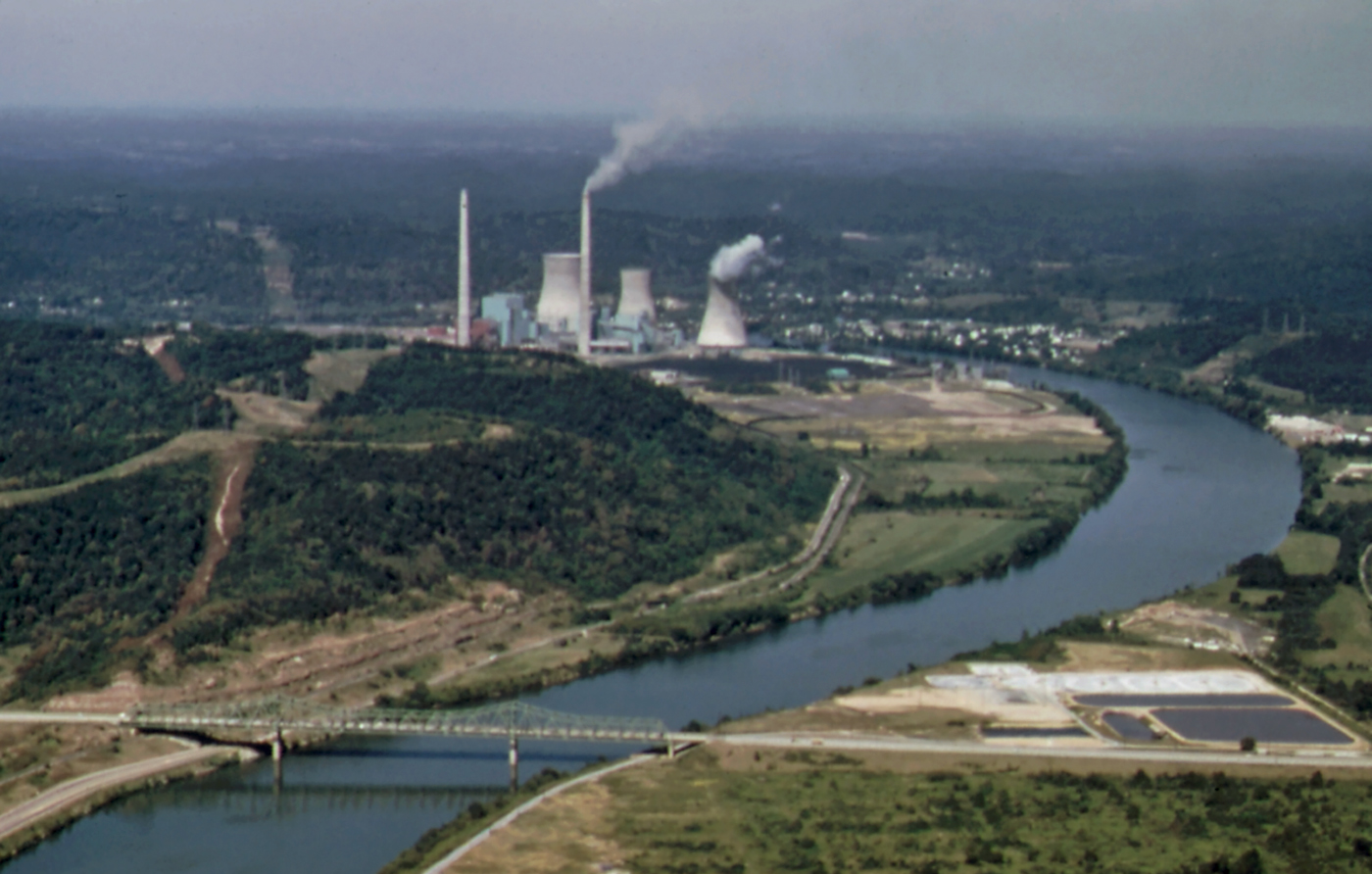
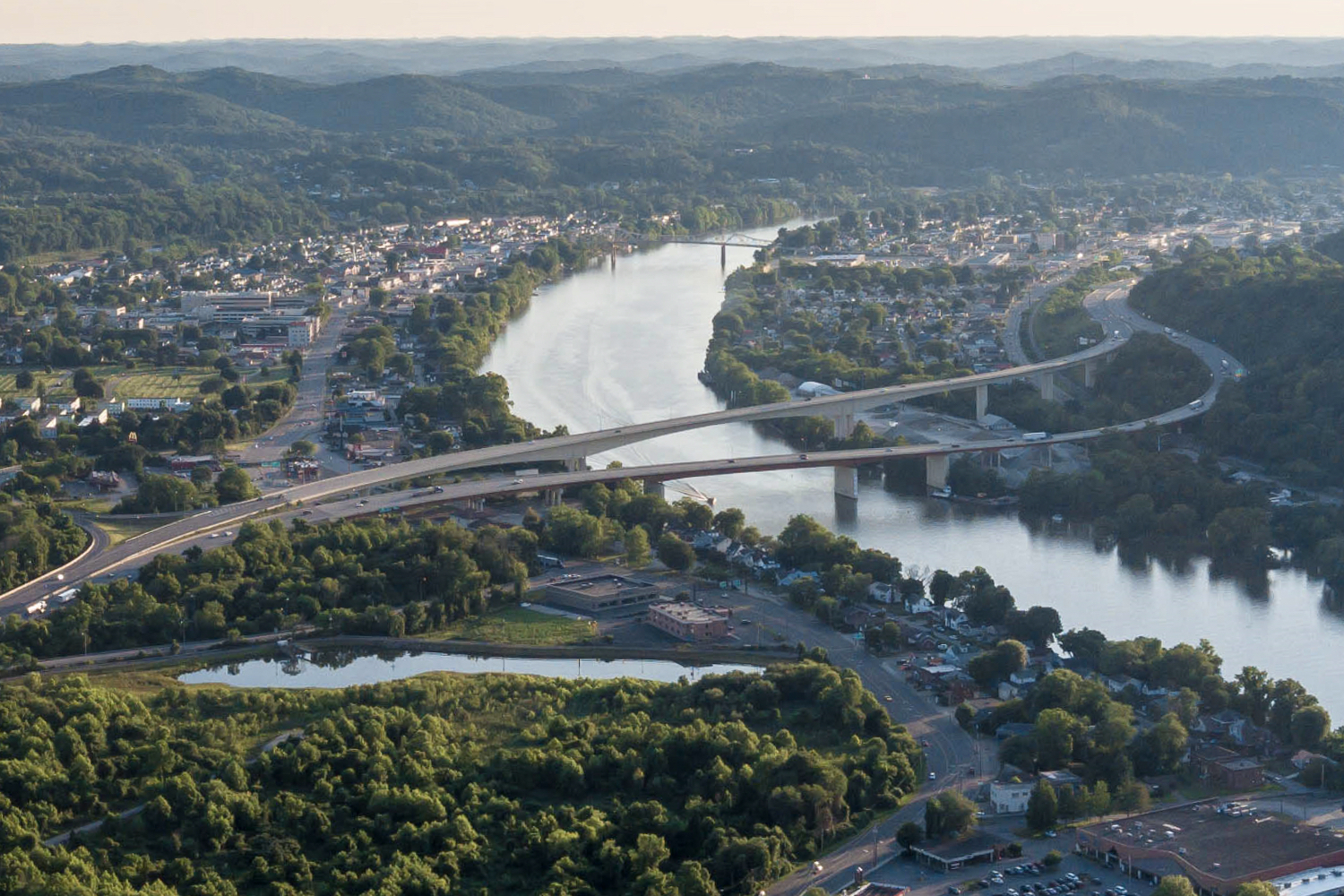
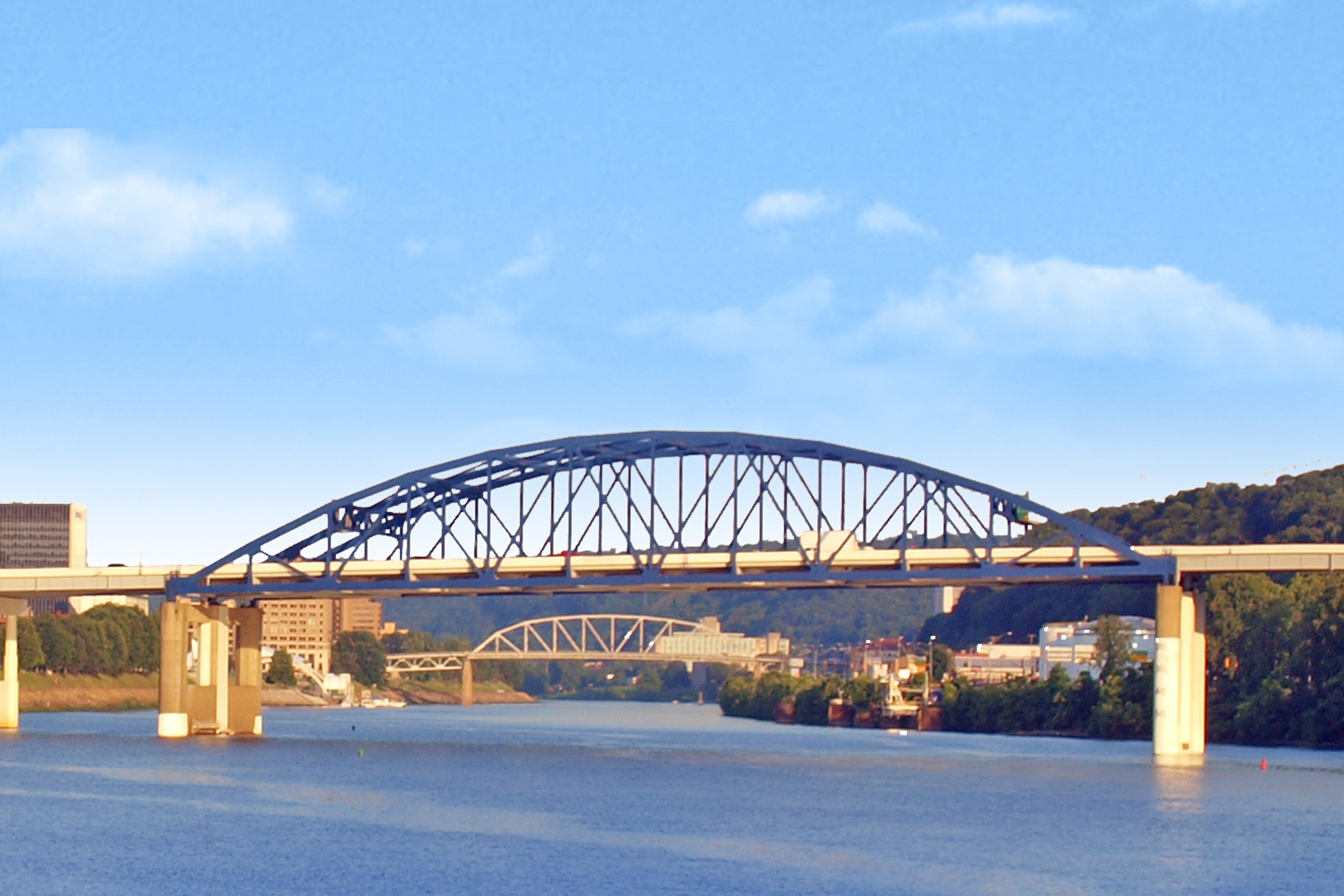
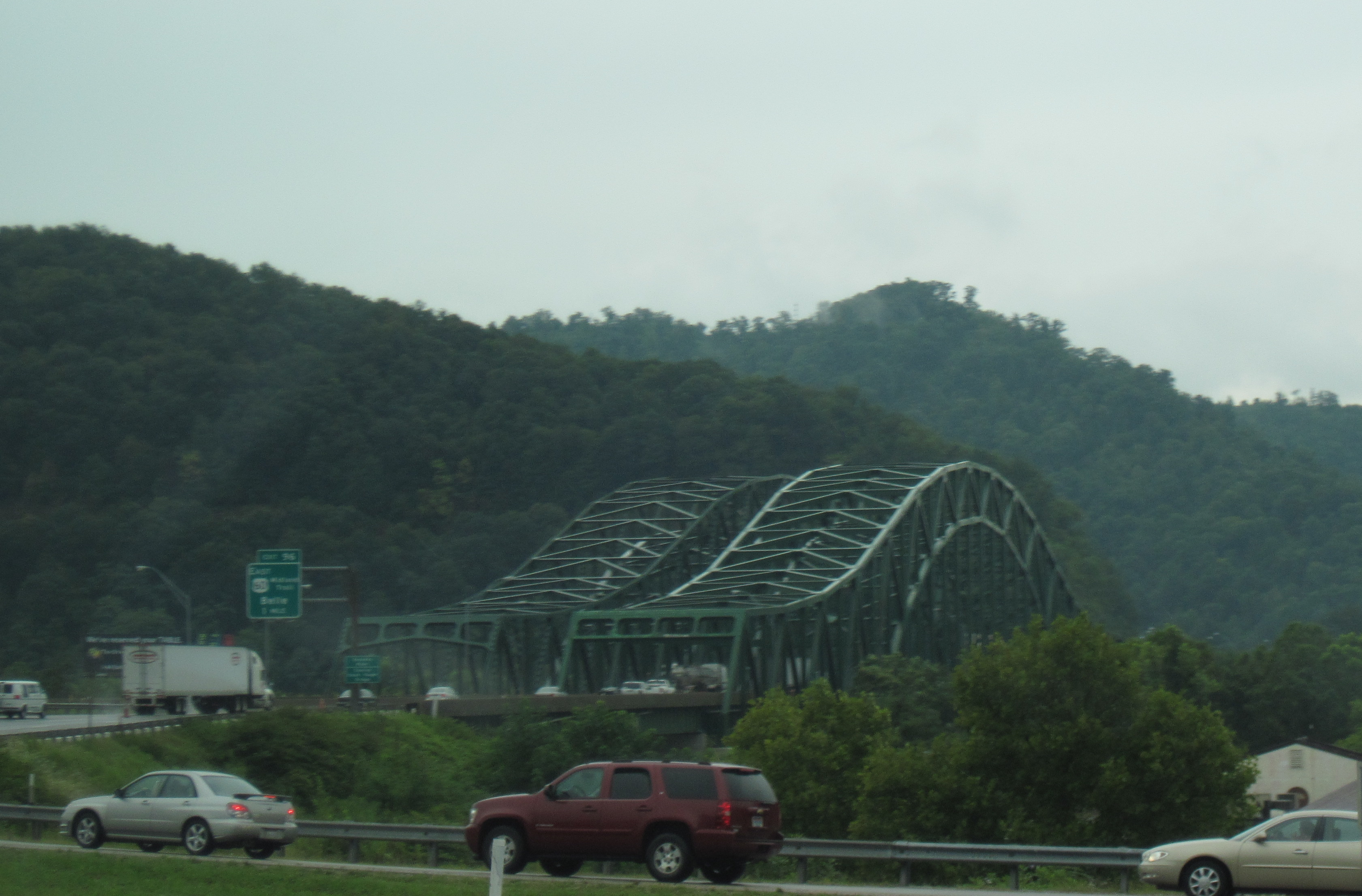
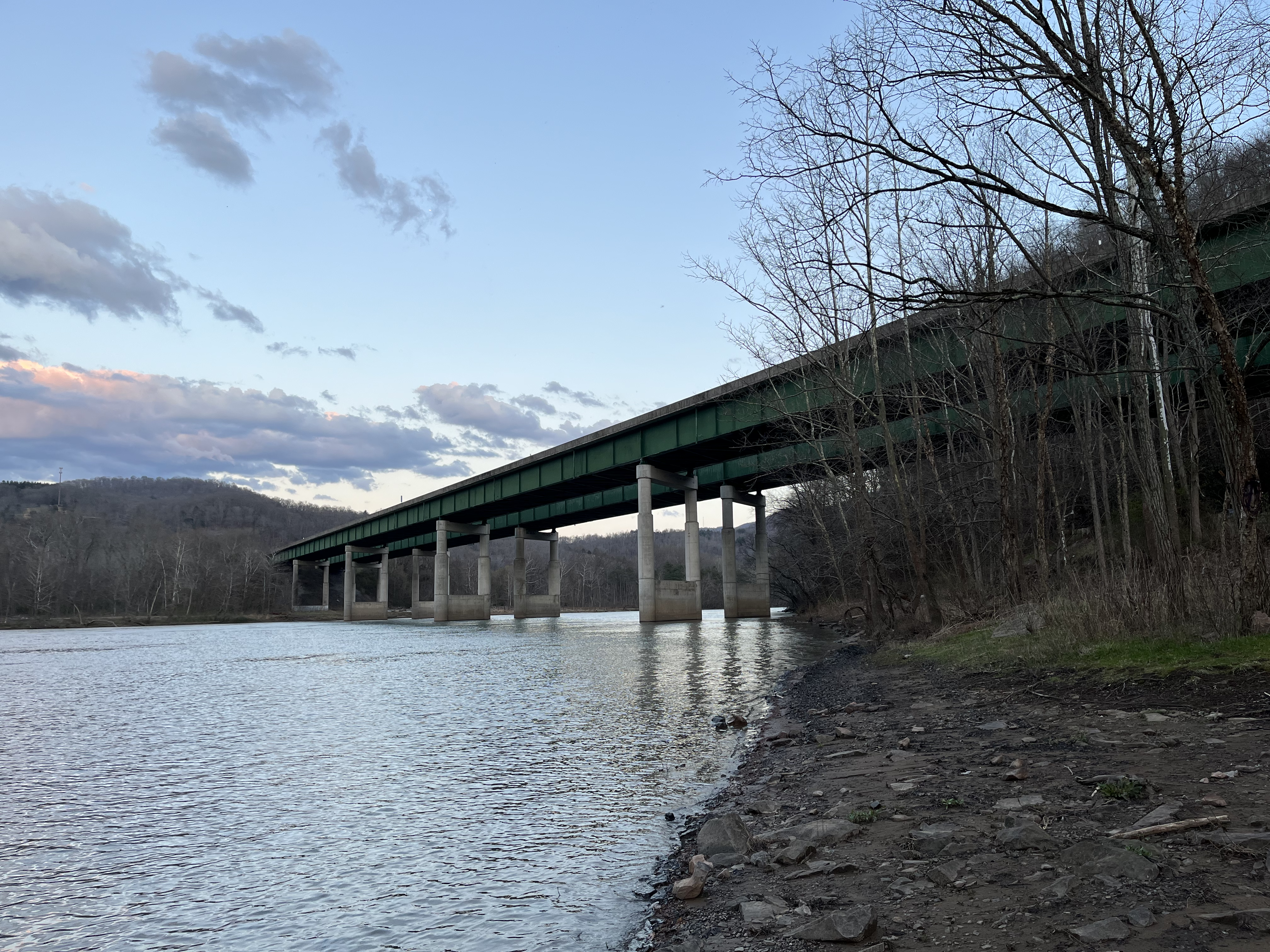
I-64 crosses the Kanawha River four times and the New River once. From top (north to south), the Donald M. Legg Memorial Bridge, South Charleston–Dunbar Bridge, Eugene A. Carter Memorial Bridge, Chuck Yeager Memorial Bridge, and Mary Draper Ingles Bridge

I-64 travels for 189 miles (304 km) within the state of West Virginia, passing by the major cities of Huntington, Beckley, and Lewisburg and directly through the capital city of Charleston. It has only two major junctions within the state: I-77 in Charleston and in Beckley. It also crosses the Kanawha River a total of four times in a 20-mile (32 km) stretch (twice west of Charleston, immediately before entering the downtown Charleston area, then approximately five miles [8.0 km] east of downtown Charleston in Kanawha City).

Between I-64's two junctions with I-77, I-64 and I-77 overlap. From the final crossing of the Kanawha River east of Charleston to their split at exit 40 south of Beckley, the two Interstates are tolled, forming a part of the West Virginia Turnpike.

While the two expressways overlap, the exit signs are those for I-77. Thus, eastbound travelers entering from Kentucky will see exit numbers increase until exit 59, at which time I-77's exit numbers are used, decreasing from exit 101.

== History ==
=== Early beginnings ===
The first segment of I-64 in West Virginia to be let to construction was in Cabell County in 1957. This segment, from US Route 60 (US 60) at milepost 15 to Ona at milepost 20, was completed in 1960.

In 1962, a lengthy segment from exit 28 at Milton to just west of exit 44 was opened to traffic. This included exits 34 and 39. One year later, I-64 was completed to exit 44, serving originally West Virginia Route 17 (WV 17), now WV 817 near St. Albans.

In 1964, an eight-mile (13 km) segment of the Interstate opened from exit 20 at Ona to exit 28 at Milton.

1965 saw the completion of a major part of I-64. A lengthy segment opened from the Kentucky state line (milepost 0) to exit 15 at Barboursville. This consisted of four interchanges: Kenova and Ceredo at milepost 1, the West Huntington Expressway (WV 94, later US 52) at milepost 6, US 52 and downtown Huntington (later WV 152/WV 527) at milepost 8, and Hal Greer Boulevard and WV 10 at milepost 10. Two steel-girder bridges were completed over the Big Sandy River connecting Kentucky to West Virginia. That bridge was replaced in 2000 in a reconstruction effort that raised the bridge level and replaced deteriorating bridge girders.

In 1966, the first Kanawha River crossing was completed with new Interstate mainlines extending from exit 44 near St. Albans to exit 50 at Institute under four contracts. This included three new interchanges: Nitro at milepost 45, Cross Lanes at milepost 47, and Institute at milepost 50. One year later, I-64 was extended eastward to Dunbar at milepost 52.4 with a new interchange constructed at that location. For six years, the Interstate would end just outside Charleston's borders.

=== Charleston's routing troubles ===
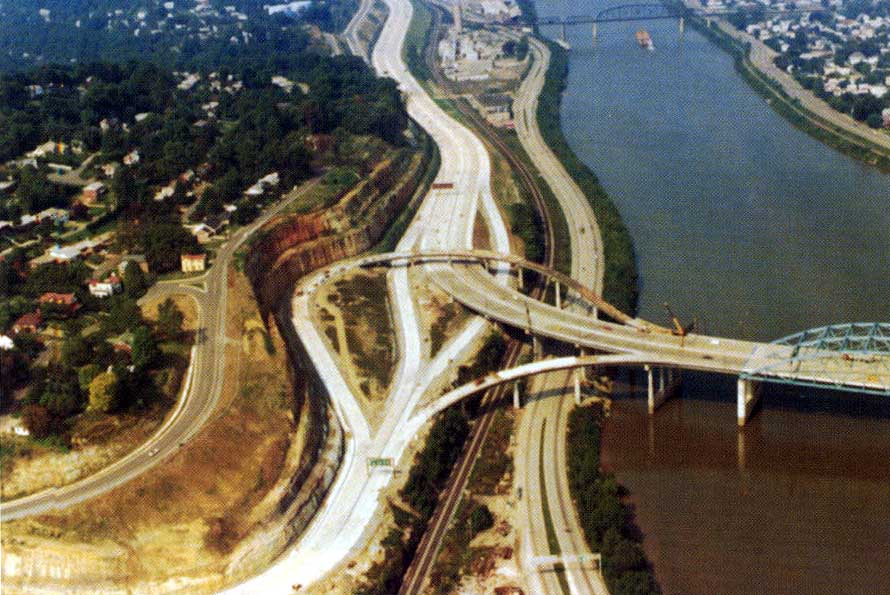
The US 119 (Corridor G) Fort Hill interchange under construction in 1973 in Charleston

Planning for the routing of I-64, as well as for I-77 and I-79 through Charleston, was embroiled in controversy since the 1950s. Several alignments were considered which included a northern arc around the Charleston metropolitan area, a downtown route, and a southern arc south of South Charleston.

The mayor at the time, John Shanklin, mayor for eight years from 1959 to 1967, was originally a strong opponent of any Interstate Highway going through the center of the city. Shanklin reversed his decision soon after and stated that Charleston can adjust to the impact and that it will eventually become a "great thing".

In 1971, the city and many residents were swimming in controversy over the proposed routes of the Interstate Highways. The long planned Interstates through West Virginia were either to run directly through the city center or to skirt it.

The plan was to bring I-64 through the Triangle District, just west of the downtown center, an urban blight, where many of the city's Black population lived. Home to the city's highest crime rates where shootings daily were common; it was referred to as the "Red Light District". Urban renewals in the past had failed. Residents living in the Triangle District formed committees and rebelled. They called the highway routing foolish because it wanted to make Charleston just another exit on an endless ribbon of concrete and that it was racist because the Black population would bear the brunt of the relocation.

Federal transportation secretary John A. Volpe stalled for months at the decision on the routing of I-64 through Charleston. By late 1971, however, the final decision was made to route the Interstate through the Triangle District. The Triangle Improvement Council fought the decision for the downtown routing and took its case to the US Supreme Court. They failed, however, as they had no basis for their case. Construction began in September 1971, cutting away parts of 14 mountains and demolishing over 1,000 homes on the south banks of the Kanawha River. WV 14 and other roads were relocated. The Fort Hill project, named so because of the mountain that lies near the massive US 119 interchange, became one of the largest earth-moving projects on the North American continent up to that point and one of the biggest changes that Charleston has ever known.

In 1971, construction began for the connection between the I-77/I-64 interchange at exit 101 (I-77 milepost 101.64) and exit 96 (milepost 95.87). In 1974, I-64 opened to traffic from milepost 52.4, two miles (3.2 km) east of exit 50 at Institute to exit 55 (milepost 55.45). This included the construction of an interchange at milepost 54 for US 60 and WV 601 and a second Kanawha River span. When the river crossing was completed, it was one of the largest steel girder bridges in the US at the time. Also, I-77/I-64 opened from exit 100 (milepost 100.16) to exit 99 (milepost 99.12).

In 1975, I-64 was completed to I-77 which included the US 119 Fort Hill interchange (exit 58A) at milepost 57.48. This segment also involved the construction of the third Kanawha River span, exits 58B and 58C and the I-77 junction at milepost 58.78. This three-level junction spans local streets and is the largest interchange in West Virginia with piers embedded in buildings, over water, and over nearby streets. This also included the viaduct over the Triangle District.

In 1976, I-77/I-64 opened from exit 96 (milepost 95.87) to the northern terminus of the West Virginia Turnpike at milepost 99.12 (exit 99). The Interstate concurrency was opened to traffic from exit 100 (milepost 100.16) to exit 101 (milepost 101.64). This completed the last segment of Interstate within Charleston city limits.

=== Charleston east to Virginia ===
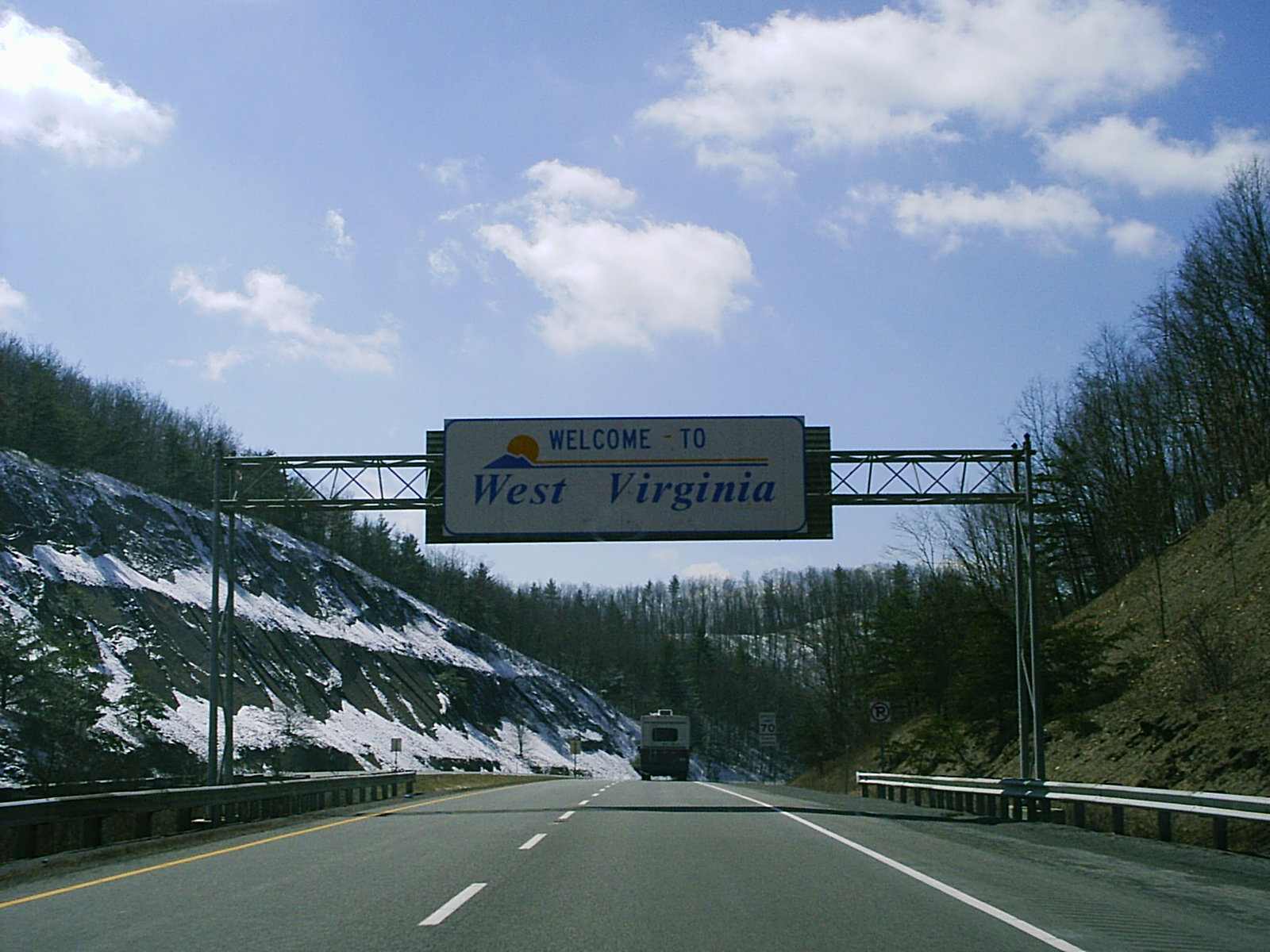
Entering West Virginia from Virginia on I-64.

The alignment of I-64 was to originally parallel US 60 from Charleston to the Virginia state line. This would go through environmentally sensitive areas such as Hawks Nest and the New River Gorge area and might have disrupted the natural beauty and the isolation of the area.

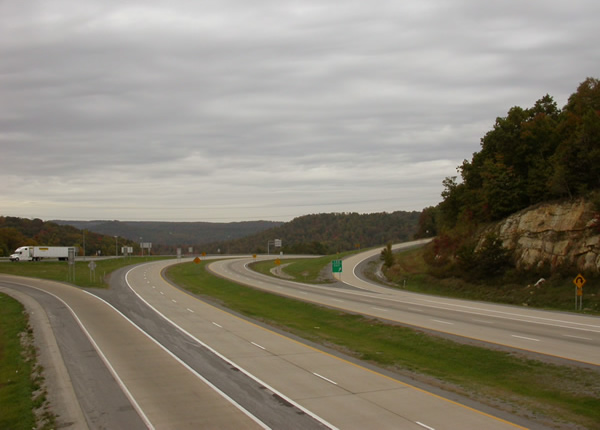
I-64 at Sandstone Mountain in Raleigh County

In 1969, Governor Arch A. Moore Jr. announced a delay in the construction of I-64 east of Charleston. He concluded that a study needed to be done on whether the highway should run parallel to US 60 east of Charleston. On March 28, 1974, Governor Moore concluded that I-64 would be routed from Sam Black Church almost due west to a junction with the West Virginia Turnpike (I-77) near Beckley, rather than following the US 60 alignment as initially proposed. From that point, I-64 was concurrent with the northern portion of an upgraded West Virginia Turnpike to reach the Charleston area. This section of I-64 is the only portion of the highway which is a toll road.

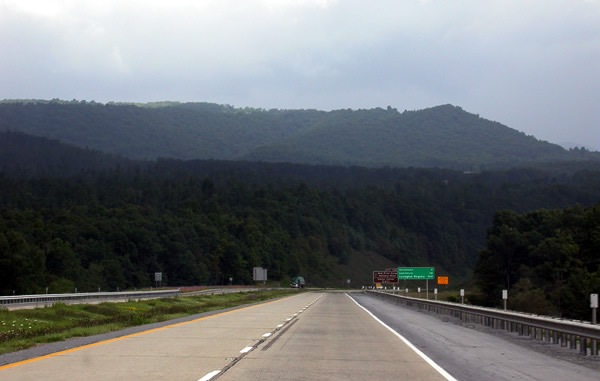
I-64 at Sandstone Mountain in Raleigh County. This is a seven-percent grade.

In 1971, I-64 was completed from WV 12 (milepost 161.46) to the Virginia state line at milepost 184.02. This included six interchanges: exit 161 for WV 12, exit 169 for US 219 and Lewisburg, exit 175 for US 60 for White Sulphur Springs, exit 181 for US 60 (westbound only), and exit 183 for WV 311 (eastbound only). It was extended westward to exit 156 (milepost 155.98) at Sam Black Church in 1973.

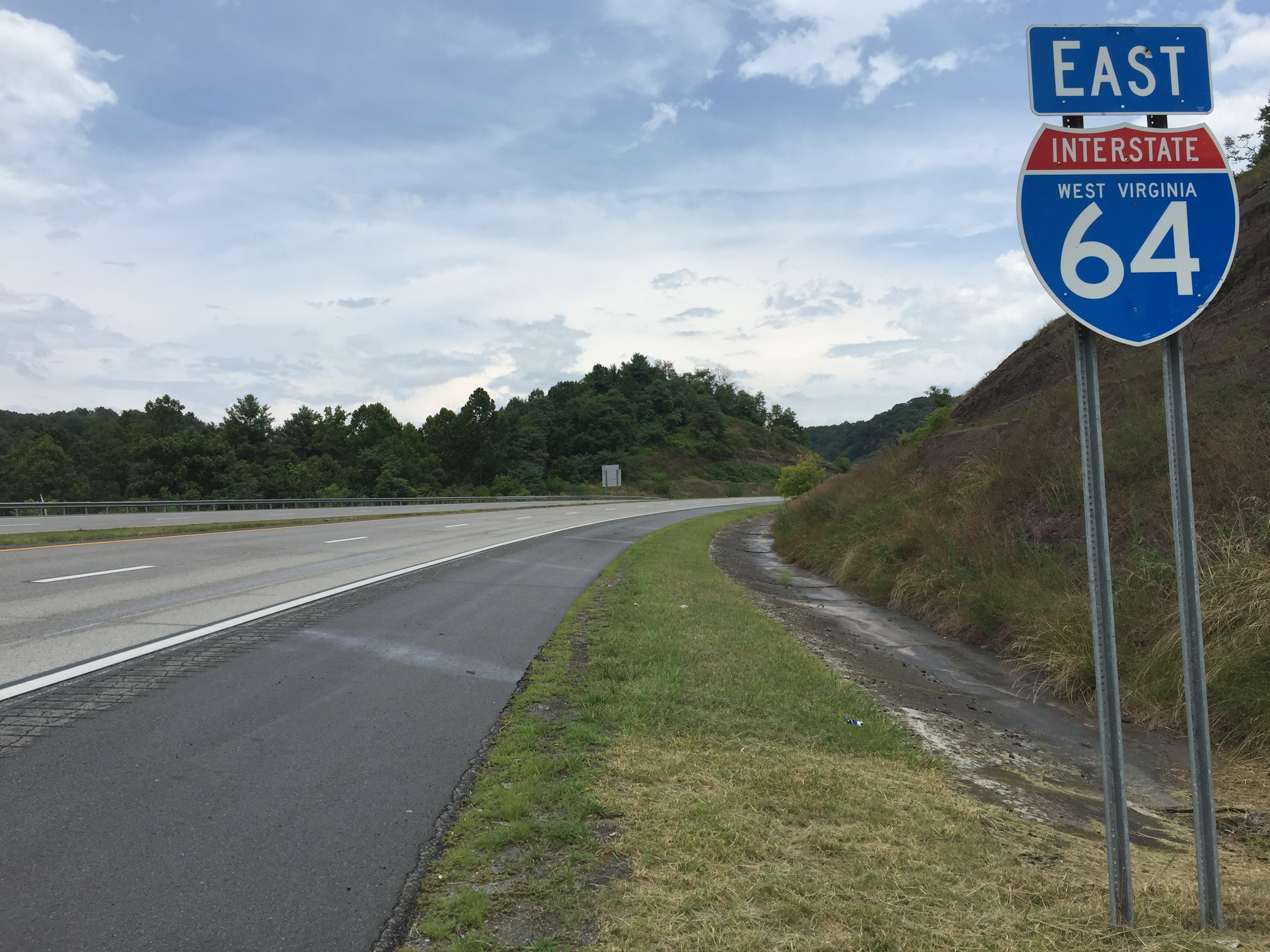
View east along I-64 east of WV 20 in Sandstone

The final segment of I-64 to be completed was between Sam Black Church and the West Virginia Turnpike near Beckley. This revised Interstate alignment traverses through an entirely rural area with extremely rugged terrain. Opened in 1988, this final portion is 38 miles (61 km) long and cost approximately $300 million (equivalent to $684 million in 2024) to construct, making it one of the most expensive segments of Interstate Highway in the US at $7.8 million per mile ($4.8 million/km; equivalent to $17.8 million per mile [$11 million/km] in 2024). It has some extremely rugged terrain, with one segment boasting a seven-percent grade downhill eastbound for seven miles (11 km) at Sandstone Mountain. Anticipating loss of braking situations, two emergency truck escape ramps were built to be used by runaway trucks. These emergency ramps were used with such frequency that, in addition to large warning signs alerting truckers to the steep grade, a special truck speed advisory system was installed to automatically weigh each truck and indicate the speed at which it should begin the downhill section.

The journey from Charleston to Lewisburg is quicker and safer on I-64 than the older routing via US 60, much of which winds through the mountains as the Midland Trail, a two-lane scenic byway, passing through hamlets such as Rainelle and Ansted.

Between mileposts 129 and 133, also in Raleigh County, is the Phil G. McDonald Bridge, also known as the Glade Creek Bridge, a 2,179-foot-long (664 m) deck truss bridge, towering 700 feet (210 m) above the creekbed.

The New River crossing is at milepost 137 on the Mary Draper Ingles Bridge, named after an American pioneer. The highway also traverses through a wildlife refuge and marsh near milepost 154.

=== Continuing improvements ===
Continuing improvements and new interchanges were discussed throughout the 1990s and 2000s.

Exit 20, the main road to the Huntington Mall and its associated developments along with US 60, was originally constructed as a diamond interchange that served Ona and US 60. The land surrounding the interchange was entirely rural and would not be developed until 1981 when Huntington Mall was completed. The diamond interchange configuration was reconstructed into a five-ramp partial cloverleaf interchange. Exit 20A served US 60 while exit 20B was for Huntington Mall. By 2001, development consumed both sides of the Interstate. On holiday shopping days, traffic would congest at the interchange and cause major backups on the Interstate. In 2001, the West Virginia Department of Transportation (WVDOT) constructed a new ramp, exit 20A, that would serve US 60 and the west end of Huntington Mall. The original exit 20A ramp was removed. Exit 20B was kept, for the most part, in its current position with a left turn lane added that allowed it to serve the east end of Huntington Mall, Melody Farm Road, and US 60. In the same year, a new interchange opened for WV 193 (Merritts Creek Connector) at Barboursville. Exit 18 serves a new four-lane highway that links US 60 and WV 2 together.

In 2002, cable barriers were installed in the median from milepost 6 to milepost 15 as a stopgap measure. These new barriers, installed for $2 million (equivalent to $3.32 million in 2024), required the regrading of the median and upgrades to the drainage system. These new protective devices have proved to be worthwhile, preventing many crossover accidents which have plagued the highway since the 1990s, mostly attributed to an increase in traffic on the overburdened Interstate Highway. This cable barrier system was extended to exit 28 at Milton in 2005, and future measures will ensure that the rest of the Interstate Highway system in West Virginia, where a depressed grassy median of similar width exists, will receive one.

Aging roadbeds and bridges are of large concern to the WVDOT. Many Interstate Highway spans are approaching the end of their useful life span, several nearing 40 years of age. One such span was in the Huntington–Ashland metropolitan area which showed significant signs of deterioration. The WV 10/Hale Greer Boulevard crossings were approaching 40 years of life and decayed to the point where regular maintenance was needed. A three-by-three-foot (0.91 by 0.91 m) segment of the westbound bridge collapsed in early 2002 after a harsh winter, for example, and this only highlighted the problems being experienced on the original I-64 spans. The two spans at WV 10 were replaced with a new wider crossing in 2009.

In 2003, the demolition of the West Pea Ridge Road overpass began. The bridge, built in 1961, utilized steel girders that had become deteriorated over the years and were replaced with prestressed concrete beams. Construction was completed in late 2004.

The second Kanawha River crossing between Dunbar and South Charleston was twinned. The new bridge, carrying eastbound traffic, was finished in October 2010. The old bridge was rehabilitated and converted to oneway traffic, with completion in October 2012. The combined bridges carry six throughlanes, three in each direction, with two auxiliary lanes to service the Dunbar and MacCorkle avenue exits on each side of the bridge. The mainspan of the new eastbound structure, at 760 feet (230 m), is the longest box girder span in the US. With the completion of the new eastbound bridge and the rehabilitation of the existing bridge for westbound traffic, I-64 has at least six lanes from Charleston to Nitro.

As of 2021, the third Kanawha River crossing at Nitro is currently under reconstruction in a project very similar to the South Charleston expansion. The Nitro crossing will be twinned, with the new bridge carrying westbound traffic. The existing bridge will be demolished and rebuilt to carry eastbound traffic. The combined spans will carry six throughlanes, three in each direction, with two auxiliary lanes servicing the Nitro and St. Albans exits on each side of the bridge. The project will also include new bridges over Rocky Step Road and McCloud Road and result in six throughlanes (three in each direction) from Charleston to the interchange with US 35. Construction is scheduled to be completed in 2023.

Other notable recent projects:

- The Darnell Road Bridge replacement is just west of the Barboursville/US 60 interchange at milepost 15. The four-lane span is being replaced with a six-lane crossing at a cost of $7.5 million (equivalent to $11.2 million in 2024). It was completed in mid-2006.
- The Hubbard Branch overpass near milepost 2 was replaced in 2005.
- The Edgewood Drive overpass near milepost 3 and the 19th Street overpass near milepost 5.5 and exit 6 was replaced in 2006.
- The Crossroads underpass to tunnel conversion was completed in 2006 at milepost 12.
- The $5-million (equivalent to $7.08 million in 2024) Milton interchange project at milepost 28 was completed in 2009.
- A new US 35 interchange in Teays Valley was started in 2003 and is now complete. A hybrid semi-directional T/diamond interchange connects I-64 to the new US 35 corridor route from Teays Valley to the previous US 35 alignment near Buffalo. In addition, I-64 has been widened to six lanes between this interchange and exit 39 at WV 34.
- Widening began on a segment from Nitro to Dunbar in 2001 and was completed in 2004.

The state's long-term construction forecast, for a six-lane Interstate from milepost 6 at West Huntington to Charleston and bridge replacements west of milepost 6 to the Kentucky state line, will take 30 years to complete at present funding levels and cost more than $325 million.

== Naming ==
The portion from the Charleston city limits to the Kentucky state line is signed as the "Cecil H. Underwood Freeway", named after the 25th and 32nd governor of West Virginia. The portion in the city limits of Charleston is signed as the "Nurse Veterans Highway". The portion from the West Virginia Turnpike to the Virginia line is the Hulett Smith Freeway, named after the 27th governor of West Virginia.

== Exit list ==
County	Location	mi	km	Exit	Destinations	Notes
Big Sandy River		0.00	0.00		I-64 west – Ashland	Continuation into Kentucky
Big Sandy River		0.00	0.00	Perry & Gentry Memorial Bridge		
Wayne	Kenova	1.29	2.08	1	US 52 south / WV 75 – Kenova, Ceredo	West end of US 52 overlap
Cabell	Huntington	6.45	10.38	6	US 52 north – West Huntington, Ironton	East end of US 52 overlap
Cabell	Huntington	8.18	13.16	8	WV 152 south (5th Street East south) / WV 527 north (5th Street East north)	
Cabell	Huntington	10.96	17.64	11	WV 10 (Hal Greer Boulevard) – Downtown Huntington	
Cabell	Barboursville	14.51	23.35	15	US 60 (29th Street East)	
Cabell	Barboursville	18.02	29.00	18	WV 193 to WV 2 – Barboursville	
Cabell	Barboursville	19.48	31.35	20A	West Mall Road to US 60	Eastbound exit only
Cabell	Barboursville	19.68	31.67	20B	CR 6089 (East Mall Road) to US 60 – Barboursville	Signed as exit 20 westbound
Cabell	Milton	27.46	44.19	28	To US 60 (CR 13) – Milton	
Cabell	Culloden				CR 6021 (Benedict Road)	Under construction
Putnam	Hurricane	33.77	54.35	34	CR 19 – Hurricane	
Putnam	Mt. Vernon	38.59	62.10	39	WV 34 – Teays Valley	
Putnam	Scott Depot	40.33	64.90	40	US 35 – Winfield, Point Pleasant	Hybrid semi-directional T/diamond interchange; all movements between I-64 and US 35 are free-flowing except for westbound I-64 to northbound US 35
Putnam	St. Albans	43.39	69.83	44	WV 817 – St. Albans	
Putnam	Nitro	44.39	71.44	45	WV 25 – Nitro	
Kanawha	Cross Lanes	47.29	76.11	47	WV 622 (Goff Mountain Road) – Cross Lanes	Signed as exits 47A (south) and 47B (north) eastbound
Kanawha		49.87	80.26	50	WV 25 – Institute	
Kanawha	Dunbar	52.28	84.14	53	WV 25 – Dunbar CR 2525 (Roxalana Road) – Dunbar	Eastbound signage Westbound signage
Kanawha	South Charleston	53.52	86.13	54	US 60 (MacCorkle Avenue) to WV 601 (Jefferson Road)	
Kanawha	South Charleston	54.35	87.47	55	Kanawha Turnpike to WV 601	Westbound exit and eastbound entrance
Kanawha	South Charleston	55.25	88.92	56	CR 5064 (Montrose Drive)	
Kanawha	Charleston	57.40	92.38	58A	US 119 south / Oakwood Road – Logan	West end of US 119 overlap
Kanawha	Charleston	57.73	92.91	58B	US 119 north / Virginia Street – Civic Center	East end of US 119 overlap; westbound access via exit 58C
Kanawha	Charleston	57.97– 58.02	93.29– 93.37	58C	US 60 (Lee Street/Washington Street) – Civic Center	Lee St. signed eastbound, Washington St. signed westbound
Kanawha	Charleston	58.50	94.15	59	I-77 north to I-79 north – Parkersburg	West end of I-77 overlap; I-77 exit 101; left exit eastbound, left entrances
Interstate 64 overlaps with Interstate 77
Raleigh	Beckley	119.66	192.57	121	I-77 south (West Virginia Turnpike south) – Bluefield	Tolled; east end of I-77 overlap; I-77 exit 40; left exit and entrance westbound
Raleigh	Beckley	123.47	198.71	124	To US 19 (Eisenhower Drive) – Beckley	Last free exit westbound
Raleigh		124.79	200.83	125	CR 99 (Airport Road) to WV 307 – Beaver	Signed as exits 125A (WV 307) and 125B (CR 9/9) eastbound
Raleigh		128.04	206.06	129	CR 9 (Grandview Road) – Shady Spring	Signed as exits 129A (south) and 129B (north) eastbound
Raleigh		132.65	213.48	133	CR 27 (Pluto Road) – Bragg	
New River				Mary Draper Ingles Bridge		
Summers	Sandstone	138.15	222.33	139	WV 20 – Hinton, Sandstone	Access via CR 7 connector road
Summers		142.95	230.06	143	To WV 20 – Meadow Bridge, Green Sulphur Springs	Access via CR 4 connector road
Greenbrier		149.55	240.68	150	CR 294 – Dawson	
Greenbrier		155.69	250.56	156	US 60 (Midland Trail) – Sam Black Church	
Greenbrier	Alta	161.18	259.39	161	WV 12 – Alta	
Greenbrier	Lewisburg	169.06	272.08	169	US 219 – Lewisburg, Ronceverte	
Greenbrier	White Sulphur Springs	174.91	281.49	175	To US 60 / WV 92 – White Sulphur Springs, Caldwell	Access via CR 6014 connector road
Greenbrier	White Sulphur Springs	179.85	289.44	181	US 60 west to WV 92 – White Sulphur Springs	West end of US 60 overlap; westbound exit and eastbound entrance
Greenbrier	White Sulphur Springs	182.90	294.35	183	WV 311 – Crows	Eastbound exit and westbound entrance
Greenbrier	White Sulphur Springs	183.51	295.33		I-64 east / US 60 east – Lexington	Continuation into Virginia
1.000 mi = 1.609 km; 1.000 km = 0.621 mi: Concurrency terminus; Proposed; Incomplete access; Tolled

Interstate 64
Previous state: Kentucky	West Virginia	Next state: Virginia
