= Rock Camp Creek =

Stream in West Virginia, U.S.

Coordinates: 37°31′02″N 80°37′09″W

Rock Camp Creek is a stream in the U.S. state of West Virginia.

Rock Camp Creek was so named for the fact Indians camped along its rocky banks.

Dropping Lick Creek flows into Rock Camp Creek near Rock Camp.

== See also ==
- List of rivers of West Virginia
