= Cashmere, West Virginia =

Unincorporated community in West Virginia, United States

- Unincorporated community
- Location within West Virginia Location within the United States
- Coordinates: 37°26′59″N 80°46′47″W
- Country: United States
- State: West Virginia
- County: Monroe
- Elevation: 1,955 ft (596 m)
- Time zone: UTC-5 (Eastern (EST))
  - Summer (DST): UTC-4 (EDT)
- Area codes: 304 & 681
- GNIS feature ID: 1550643

Cashmere is an unincorporated community in Monroe County, West Virginia, United States. Cashmere is located on West Virginia Route 12, north of Peterstown.

The community was named after Kashmir in Asia.
