= West Virginia Route 24 =

State highway in Preston, County, West Virginia, United States

West Virginia Route 24

Route information
- Maintained by WVDOH
- Length: 5.6 mi (9.0 km)

Major junctions
- South end: US 219 in Silver Lake
- North end: US 50 in Brookside

Location
- Country: United States
- State: West Virginia
- Counties: Preston

Highway system
- West Virginia State Highway System; Interstate; US; State
← WV 23	→ WV 25

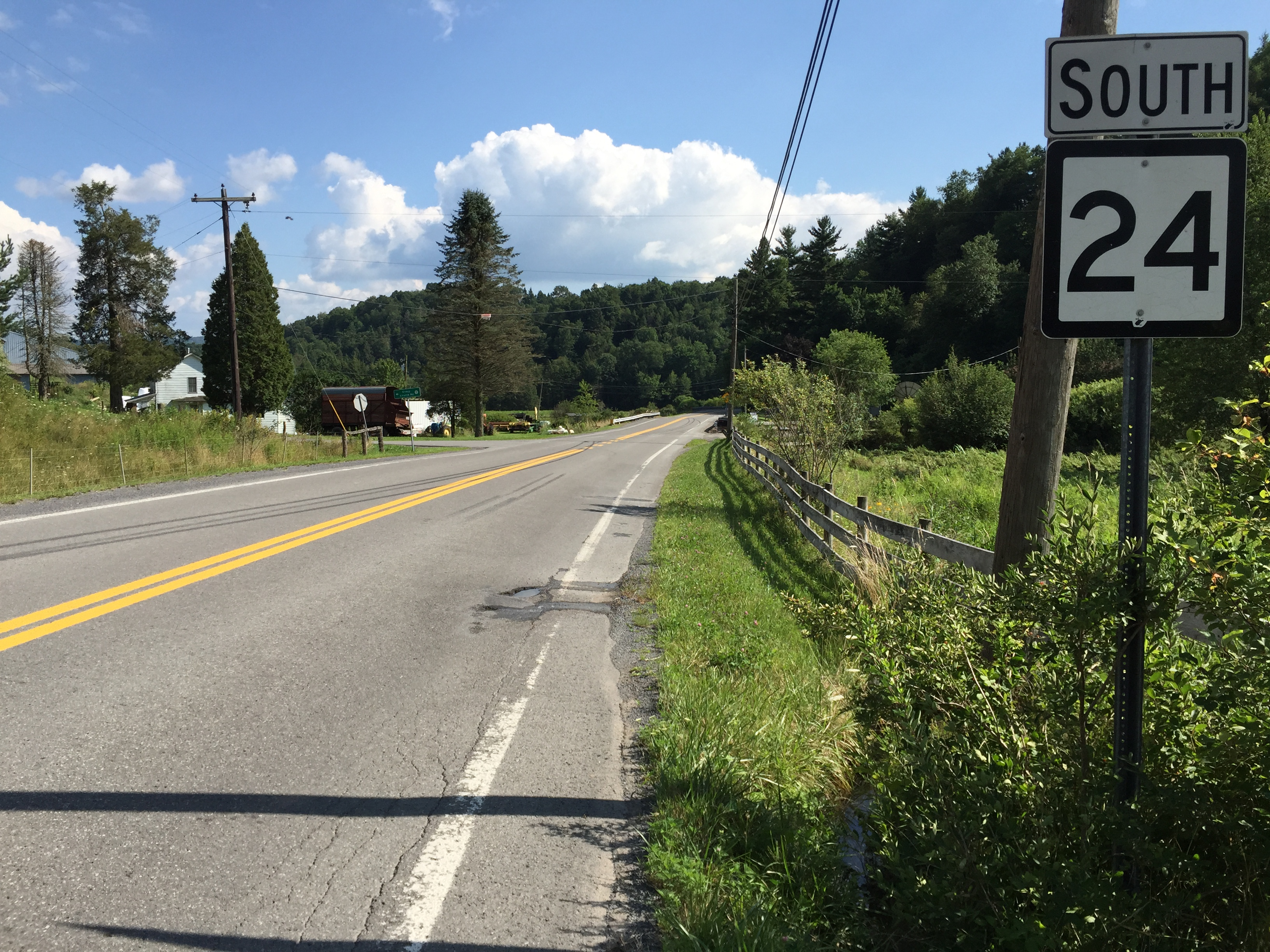
View south along WV 24 at CR 24/1 in Eglon

West Virginia Route 24 is a north–south state highway located within Preston County in the U.S. state of West Virginia. The southern terminus of the route is at U.S. Route 219 in Silver Lake. The northern terminus is at U.S. Route 50 in Brookside.

== Major intersections ==
The entire route is in Preston County.

Location	mi	km	Destinations	Notes
Silver Lake	0.0	0.0	US 219	
Brookside	5.6	9.0	US 50 – Grafton, Romney	
1.000 mi = 1.609 km; 1.000 km = 0.621 mi
