= Valley Heights, West Virginia =

- Unincorporated community
- Location within West Virginia Location within the United States
- Coordinates: 37°41′32″N 80°42′57″W
- Country: United States
- State: West Virginia
- County: Summers
- Elevation: 1,565 ft (477 m)
- Time zone: UTC-5 (Eastern (EST))
  - Summer (DST): UTC-4 (EDT)
- Area codes: 304 & 681
- GNIS feature ID: 1555871

Valley Heights is an unincorporated community in Summers County, West Virginia, United States. The community is located along the Greenbrier River, approximately 7 miles (11 km) southwest of Alderson and 15 miles (24 km) east of Hinton. Valley Heights is served by West Virginia Route 3 and West Virginia Route 12.
