= Clendenenville, West Virginia =

Unincorporated community in West Virginia, United States

- Unincorporated community
- Location within West Virginia Location within the United States
- Coordinates: 37°52′44″N 80°24′43″W
- Country: United States
- State: West Virginia
- County: Greenbrier
- Elevation: 2,264 ft (690 m)
- Time zone: UTC-5 (Eastern (EST))
  - Summer (DST): UTC-4 (EDT)
- Area codes: 304 & 681
- GNIS feature ID: 1554147

Clendenenville is an unincorporated community in Greenbrier County, West Virginia, United States. Clendenenville is located along U.S. Route 219, 5.5 miles (8.9 km) north-northeast of Lewisburg.
