= U.S. Route 219 in West Virginia =

Segment of American highway

U.S. Route 219
- US 219 highlighted in red

Route information
- Maintained by WVDOH
- Length: 196 mi (315 km)
- Existed: 1926–present

Major junctions
- South end: US 219 at the Virginia state line near Peterstown
- US 60 in Lewisburg; I-64 in Lewisburg; WV 55 from Hillsboro to Elkins; US 250 from Huttonsville to Elkins; US 33 in Elkins; US 48 from Elkins to Thomas
- North end: US 219 at the Maryland state line near Silver Lake

Location
- Country: United States
- State: West Virginia
- Counties: Monroe, Greenbrier, Pocahontas, Randolph, Tucker, Preston

Highway system
- United States Numbered Highway System; List; Special; Divided; West Virginia State Highway System; Interstate; US; State
← WV 218	→ US 220

U.S. Route 219 (US 219) is a part of the U.S. Highway System that travels from Rich Creek, Virginia, to West Seneca, New York. In the U.S. state of West Virginia, the U.S. Highway travels from the Virginia state line near Peterstown to the Maryland state line near Silver Lake.

== Route description ==
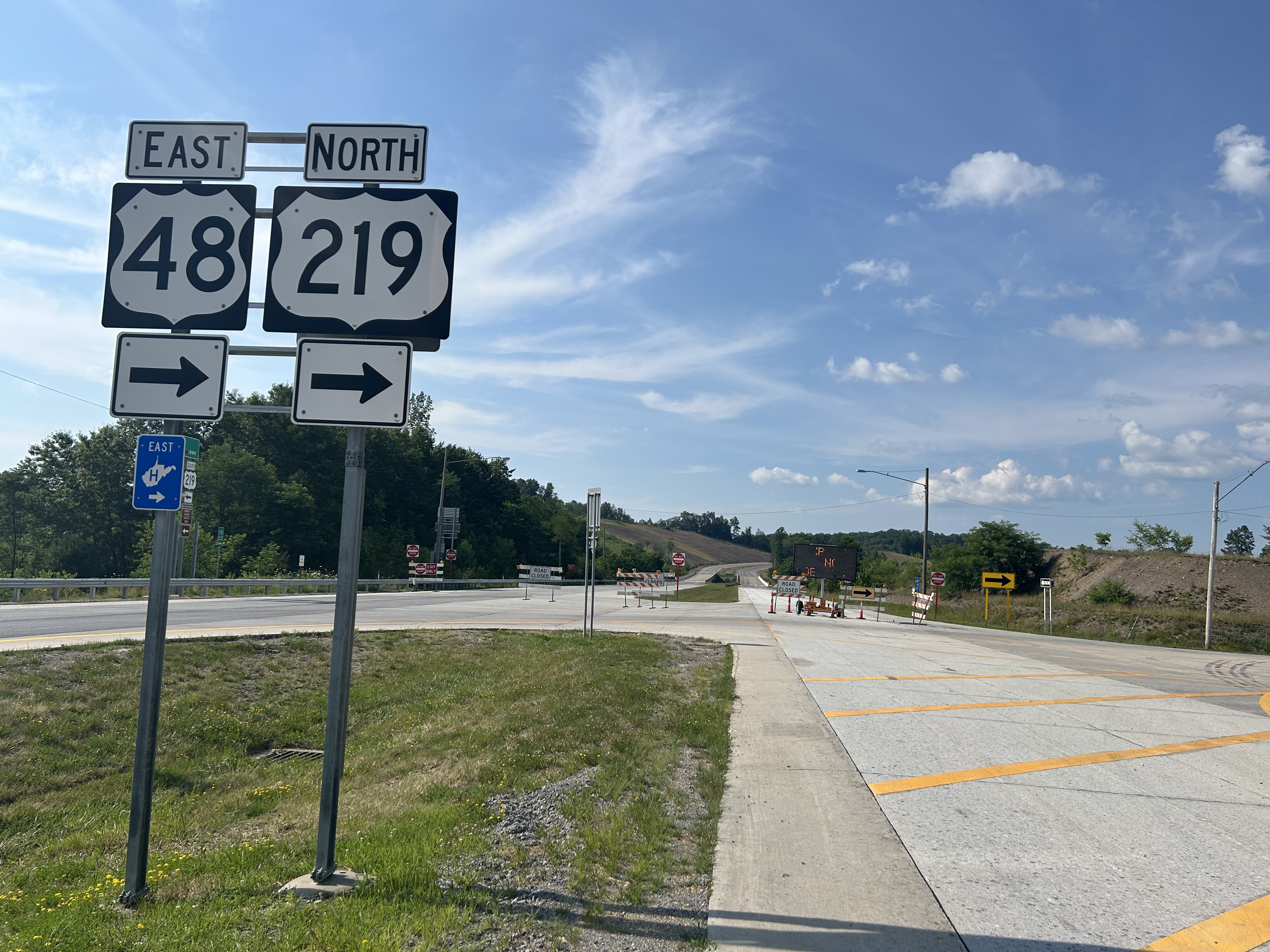
View north along US 219 and US 48 in Kerens with the Kerens-Parsons section of Corridor H under construction in the background

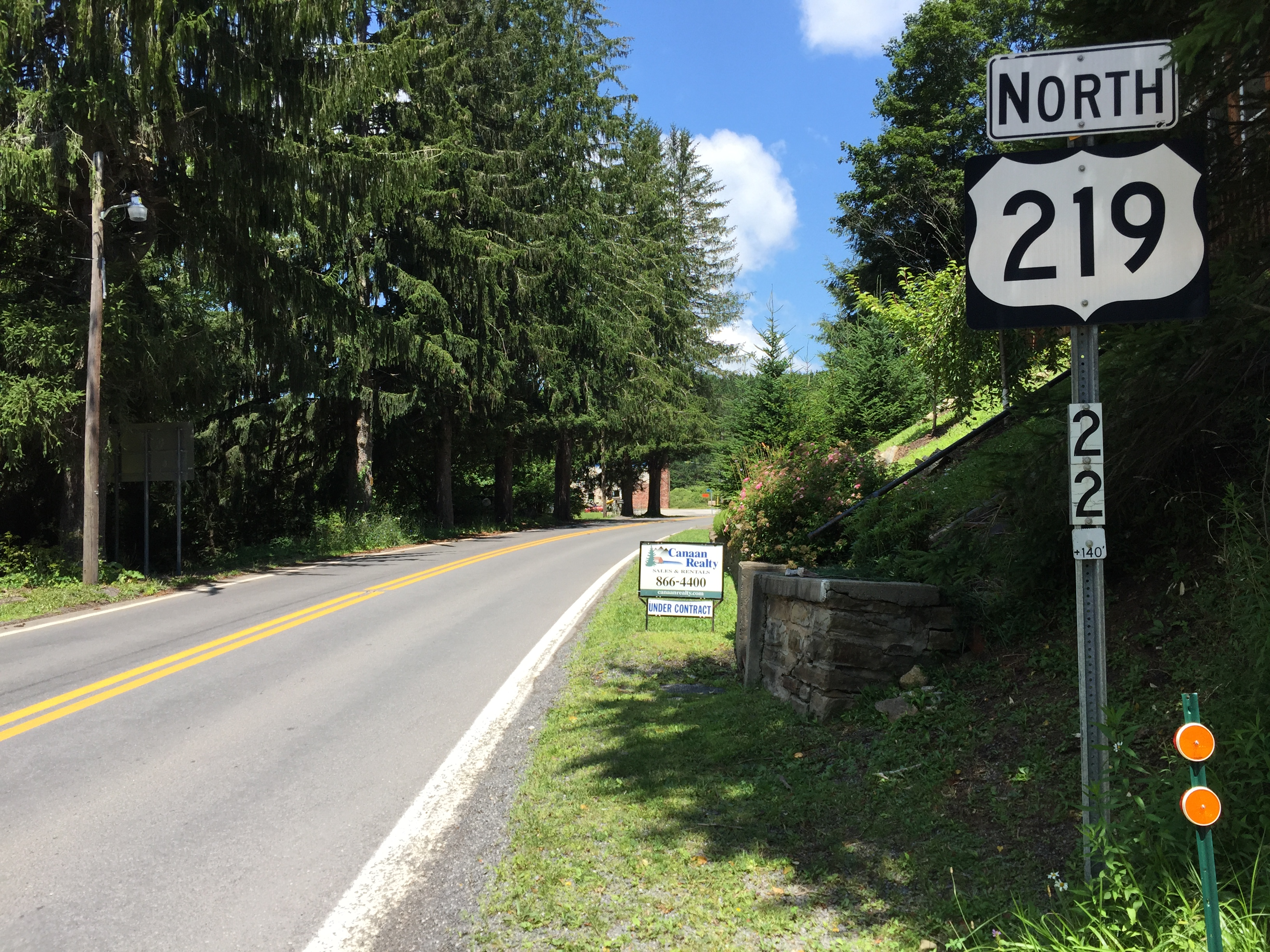
View north along US 219 at WV 32 in Thomas

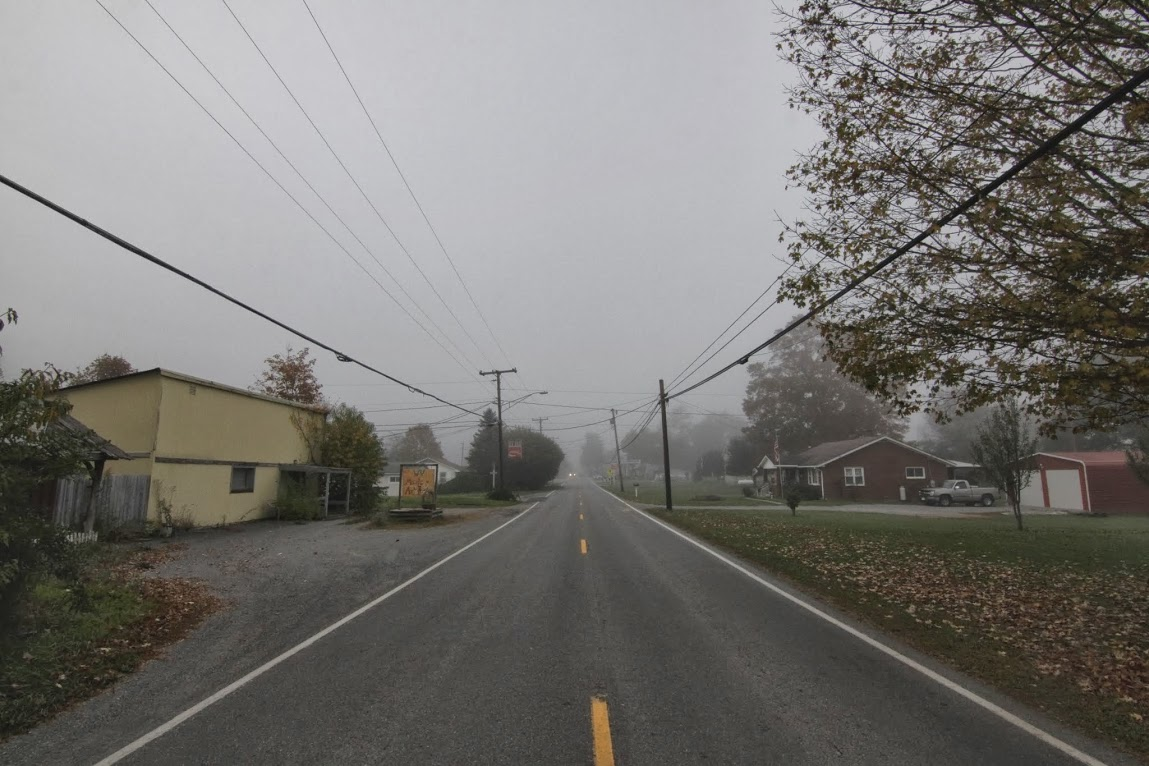
US 219 in Hillsboro

US 219 enters West Virginia in Peterstown at the split of US 219 and WV 12. US 219 then heads northeast into Union. US 219 continues through Greenbrier County running through the towns of Ronceverte, Lewisburg, where it intersects US 60, and Falling Spring. US 219 continues north into Pocahontas County and through the towns of Hillsboro and Marlinton. US 219 runs north into Randolph County and begins its dual certification with US 250. They both serve the towns of Huttonsville, Mill Creek, Beverly, and Elkins, where US 33 joins the concurrency. US 219 splits from US 33 and US 250 just north of Elkins. US 219 continues through the town of Montrose until it enters Tucker County. From here, US 219 runs through the towns of Parsons and Thomas. US 219 heads north into rural Preston County and exits West Virginia into Garrett County, Maryland.

== Major Intersections ==
County	Location	mi	km	Destinations	Notes
Monroe	Peterstown	0.00	0.00	US 219 south – Christiansburg	Virginia state line
Monroe	Peterstown			WV 12 north – Alta	Southern terminus of WV 12
Monroe	Rock Camp			WV 122 west – Forest Hill	Eastern terminus of WV 122
Monroe	Union			WV 3 east – Sweet Springs	South end of WV 3 overlap
Monroe	Pickaway			WV 3 west – Alderson	North end of WV 3 overlap
Greenbrier	Organ Cave			WV 63 east – Caldwell	South end of WV 63 overlap
Greenbrier	Ronceverte			WV 63 west – Alderson	North end of WV 63 overlap
Greenbrier	Lewisburg			US 60 – Hico, White Sulphur Springs	
Greenbrier	Lewisburg			I-64 – Lexington VA, Beckley	Interchange; I-64 exit 169
Pocahontas	Mill Point			WV 39 / WV 55 west – Fenwick	South end of WV 39/WV 55 overlaps
Pocahontas	Marlinton			WV 39 east – Minnehaha Springs	North end of WV 39 overlap
Pocahontas	Edray			WV 150 south – Raintown	Northern terminus of WV 150
Pocahontas	Snowshoe			WV 66 east – Snowshoe	Western terminus of WV 66
Randolph	Huttonsville			US 250 east / WV 92 south – Staunton	South end of US 250/WV 92 overlaps
Randolph	Elkins			US 33 / WV 55 east – Seneca Rocks	South end of US 33 overlap; north end of WV 55 overlap
Randolph	Elkins			WV 92 north – Belington	North end of WV 92 overlap
Randolph	Elkins			US 33 / US 48 west / US 250 north to I-79 – Buckhannon	Interchange; north end of US 33/US 250 overlaps; south end of US 48 overlap
Randolph	Kerens			US 48 east – Parsons	North end of US 48 overlap
Tucker				To US 48 – Elkins, Parsons	Connector road
Tucker	Parsons			WV 72 north – Rowlesburg	South end of WV 72 overlap
Tucker	Bretz			WV 72 south – Dryfork	North end of WV 72 overlap
Tucker				US 48 west	Proposed interchange; proposed south end of US 48 overlap
Tucker				US 48 east – Davis	Proposed north end of US 48 overlap
Tucker	Thomas			WV 32 south / US 48 east – Davis	Northern terminus of WV 32; north end of US 48 overlap
Tucker	Thomas			WV 90 north – Red House MD	Southern terminus of WV 90
Preston	Silver Lake			WV 24 north – Eglon	Southern terminus of WV 24
Preston	Silver Lake			US 219 north – Oakland	Maryland state line
1.000 mi = 1.609 km; 1.000 km = 0.621 mi: Concurrency terminus; Unopened
