= 2018 Florida shooting =

2018 Florida shooting may refer to:

- Jacksonville Landing shooting
- Stoneman Douglas High School shooting
