= Campbelltown, West Virginia =

Unincorporated community in West Virginia, United States

- Unincorporated community
- Location within West Virginia Location within the United States
- Coordinates: 38°14′30″N 80°05′26″W
- Country: United States
- State: West Virginia
- County: Pocahontas
- Elevation: 2,159 ft (658 m)
- Time zone: UTC-5 (Eastern (EST))
  - Summer (DST): UTC-4 (EDT)
- Area codes: 304 & 681
- GNIS feature ID: 1554057

Campbelltown is an unincorporated community in Pocahontas County, West Virginia, United States. Campbelltown is located on U.S. Route 219, 1.5 miles (2.4 km) north of Marlinton.
