= Jones Diamond =

34.48 carat (6.896 g) alluvial diamond

The Jones Diamond, also known as the Punch Jones Diamond, The Grover Jones Diamond, or The Horseshoe Diamond, was a 34.48 carat (6.896 g) alluvial diamond found in Peterstown, West Virginia by members of the Jones family. It remains the largest alluvial diamond ever discovered in North America.

== Diamond Characteristics ==
The bluish-white diamond weighed 34.48 carats (6.896 g), measured 5/8 of an inch (16 mm) across and possessed 12 diamond-shaped faces.

== History of the diamond ==
The diamond was discovered by William P. “Punch” Jones and his father, Grover C. Jones, Sr. while pitching horseshoes in April 1928. Believed to be simply a piece of shiny quartz common to the area, the stone was kept in a wooden cigar box inside a tool shed for fourteen years throughout the Great Depression. In 1942, Punch brought the stone to Roy J. Holden, a geology professor at Virginia Polytechnic Institute (VPI) – more commonly known as Virginia Tech – in nearby Blacksburg, Virginia. Holden, shocked at Punch's discovery, authenticated the diamond and the diamond was sent to the Smithsonian Institution where it remained for many years for display and safekeeping. In February 1964, the Jones family brought the diamond back and placed it in a safe deposit box in the First Valley National Bank in Rich Creek, Virginia.

In 1984, the Joneses auctioned the diamond through Sotheby's auction house in New York to an agent representing a lawyer in an undisclosed east Asian country.

== West Virginia State Historical Marker ==
The text of the historical marker located in Peterstown, West Virginia reads the following, although some of the information is outdated as Mr. and Mrs. Jones are no longer living or in possession of the diamond (see above):

An alluvial diamond weighing 34.48 carats (6.896 g), largest to date found in North America was discovered here in April 1928, by William P. "Punch" Jones and his father Grover C. Jones, Sr., while pitching horseshoes in the home yard of Mr. and Mrs. Grover C. Jones. "Punch" was later killed in combat during World War II. Mr. and Mrs. Grover C. Jones still retain ownership of the diamond.

== See also ==
- List of diamonds

== Sources ==
- "Virginia Diamonds," Virginia Division of Mineral Resources
- Sweet, P.C., 1996, Diamonds in Virginia: Virginia Division of Mineral Resources Virginia Minerals, v. 42, n. 4, p. 33-40.
- Charles B. Motley, Gleanings of Monroe County West Virginia History (Radford, Va: Commonwealth Press, Inc., 1973) 122–124.
- d West Virginia Highway Markers Database
- "Diamonds," Virginia Division of Mineral Resources
