= 2018 Jacksonville Landing shooting =

Mass shooting in Florida, U.S.

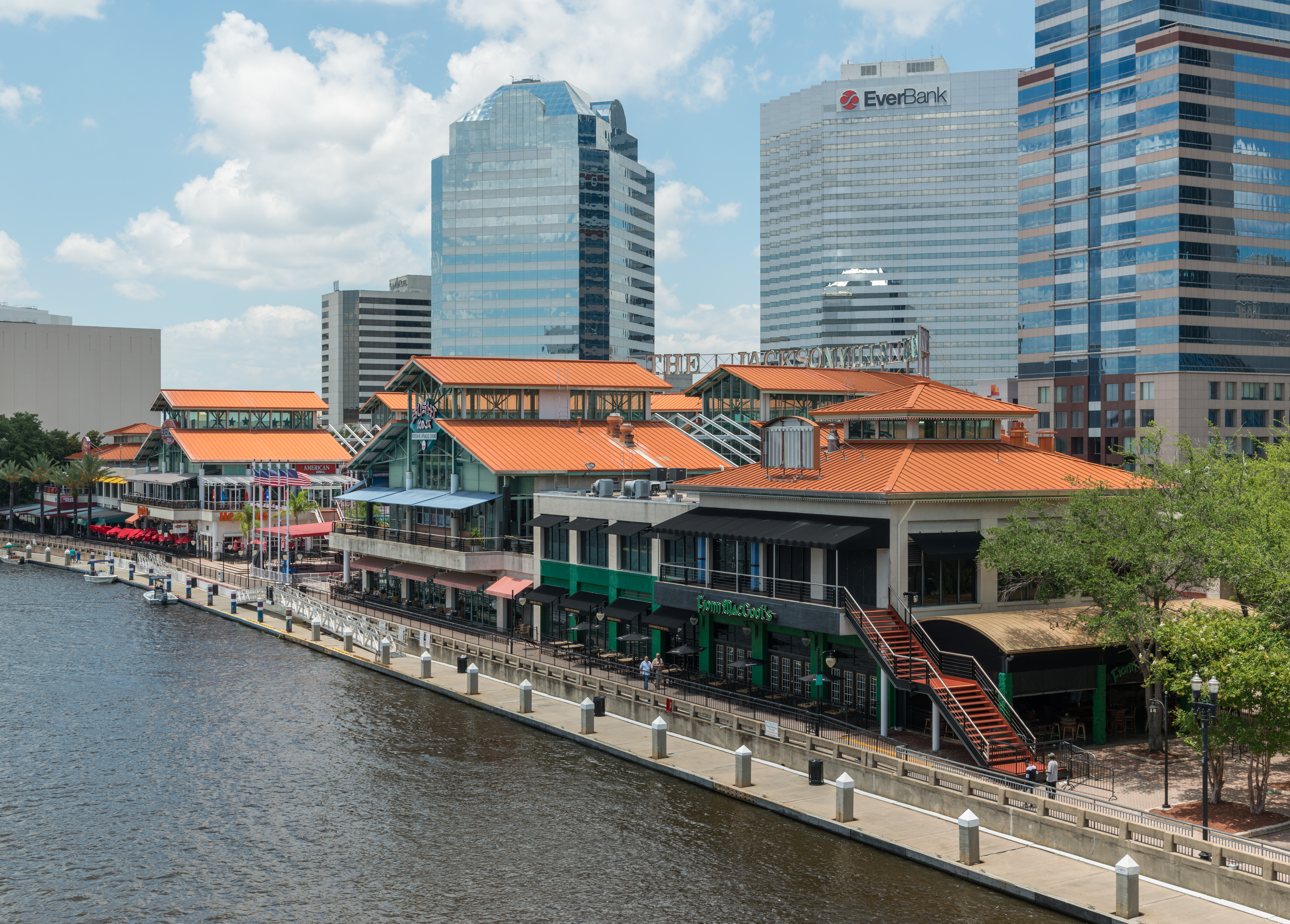
- The Jacksonville Landing in 2016

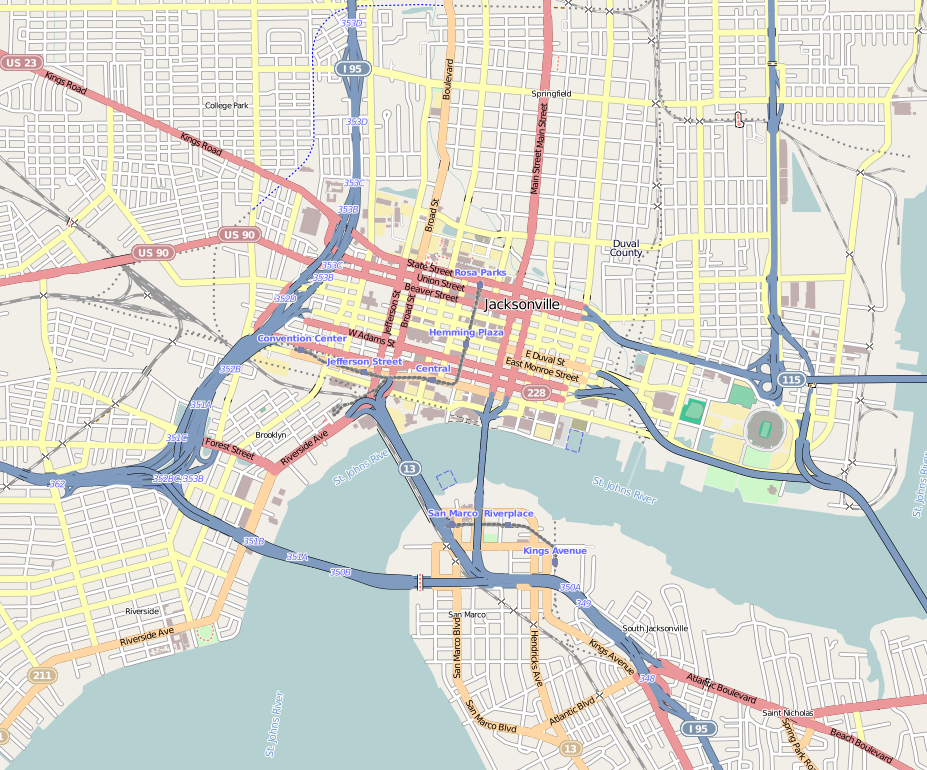
- Location: Jacksonville Landing, Jacksonville, Florida, U.S.
- Date: August 26, 2018; 8 years ago c. 1:30 – 1:35 pm (EDT; UTC−04:00)
- Attack type: Mass shooting; murder-suicide
- Weapons: Metro Arms Company (MAC) 3011 SSD-T M1911-style .45-caliber semi-automatic pistol with a laser sight; 9mm Springfield Armory XD Mod.2 sub-compact semi-automatic pistol (unused, kept in waistband)
- Deaths: 3 (including the perpetrator)
- Injuries: 11 (10 by gunfire)
- Perpetrator: David Katz
- Motive: Inconclusive, anger after tournament loss, personal issues with Eli Clayton.

External videos
- Video showing the game at the time the shooting occurred, with the shots audible - an MSNBC YouTube Video - (cable channel replays a video streamed on Twitch)

On August 26, 2018, a mass shooting occurred during a Madden NFL 19 qualifying tournament at the GLHF (Good Luck Have Fun) Game Bar in the Jacksonville Landing marketplace in Jacksonville, Florida, United States. The shooting was carried out by 24-year-old professional gamer David Katz of Baltimore, Maryland. After he was eliminated from the competition, Katz returned to the venue with a handgun and opened fire on tournament participants and spectators, killing two people and wounding eleven others before fatally shooting himself.

Investigators determined that Katz acted alone and that the attack was not an act of terrorism. Katz, a former competitive Madden player who had previously won a major tournament, had a documented history of mental illness and had legally purchased the firearms used in the attack.

== Shooting ==
The GLHF (Good Luck Have Fun) Game Bar, a video game venue in the Jacksonville Landing indoor marketplace, hosted a Madden NFL 19 video gaming tournament on August 26, 2018, with around 130 to 150 participants and fans. After one of the participants, David Katz, lost a game, he refused to shake the hand of the winner and left the tournament. Soon after, he returned with one of the two handguns he had brought to the event.

Katz fired 12 shots, killing two people and wounding ten others, before committing suicide. One more sustained injuries while fleeing. A tournament announcer said that he had been interviewing the first victim before the interviewee was fatally shot, and that he had been intentionally targeted. The gunman then turned and began shooting indiscriminately.

Gunfire was first reported on social media at 1:34 pm EDT by tournament participants. The event's Twitch stream recorded footage of the shooting, which was later uploaded to YouTube.

The Jacksonville Sheriff's Office urged individuals to stay away from the location at 2:13 pm EDT, and SWAT officers evacuated and searched the area. First responders arrived on the scene within two minutes of the first 911 call, and arrived at 1:36 pm EDT. The president of the firefighters union told reporters that they were training in the area when victims had run up to staff for help. Due to the location being next to the St. Johns River, the Coast Guard was called in to sweep the surrounding waterways.

== Victims ==
=== Fatalities ===
- Elijah Clayton, age 22, from Woodland Hills, California, was a professional gamer known by the aliases "True" and "Trueboy". He had reportedly made a last-minute decision to attend the Jacksonville tournament. A video circulating on social media after the shooting appeared to show a red dot on Clayton's chest from the laser sight on Katz's handgun about 3 seconds before the shooting.
- Taylor Robertson, age 27, from Ballard, West Virginia, was a professional gamer known by the alias "SpotMePlzzz".

=== Non-fatal injuries ===
Eleven people were taken to hospitals for treatment of their injuries. Some of the injured had been able to leave the bar and sought assistance from first responders. Two others had driven themselves to the hospital. Of those injured, ten individuals received gunshot wounds and one person was injured attempting to flee from the location. The day after the incident, Memorial Hospital released a statement that one individual had minor injuries, and three were in good condition, and UF Health announced that four victims had been released, with two still admitted.

== Perpetrator ==
The shooter, David Katz, was a 24-year-old professional Madden player from Baltimore, Maryland, who had been attending the Jacksonville tournament as a participant. His parents were divorced and he was Jewish. Katz had lost a few rounds in the competition, which prevented him from reaching the finals. Fellow competitors reported that he had been "acting weird" and refused to shake hands with them after losing the competition. His pseudonyms included "Bread", "mrslicedbread", "RavensChamp", "ravens2012champ" and "TREXHAVAHARTATAK". He had previously won $10,000 in a 2017 Madden Tournament. Katz had a history of mental illness and was prescribed anti-psychotic medication. He was diagnosed with dysthymia and oppositional disorder not otherwise specified and had been involuntarily committed to mental hospitals on numerous occasions.

== Investigation ==
The Jacksonville Sheriff's Office used Twitter to announce that there were fatalities at the scene at 2:45 pm EDT, and that one suspect was dead at the scene at 2:53 pm EDT. Initially, it was unknown whether there were additional gunmen, but later, officials confirmed that there was only one suspect in the shooting. He was armed with a .45 caliber handgun and a 9mm handgun, with the Sheriff's Office stating that one of the weapons was equipped with an aftermarket laser sight attached to the trigger guard. The weapons had been stored in his vehicle, and purchased legally in Baltimore, Maryland.

The Sheriff's Office issued an update at 7:37 pm EDT, indicating that the FBI were involved in the investigation, and that there was coordination with officers in the suspect's hometown of Baltimore. Police and federal agents visited a house in South Baltimore, which was identified as Katz's father's home. They added that updates would be posted on their Twitter accounts. Electronic Arts, which published Madden NFL 19 and had approved the competition, cooperated with the investigations.

The Sheriff's Office reported that the incident is being investigated as a criminal act and not as an act of terrorism.

== Lawsuit ==
As of August 30, 2018, at least one participant had filed a lawsuit against the tournament sponsor Electronic Arts, the game manufacturer, the mall, and the restaurant where the incident occurred. The lawsuit claims "to hold those responsible accountable, and to ensure that gamers [...] are able to get together to pursue their passion without having to fear for their lives".

== Response ==
Participants and sponsors of participants took to social media to express safety, injuries, and recollections of the incident. Electronic Arts (EA) released a statement saying its "most heartfelt sympathies" went out to the families of the victims and those who were injured and that its focus was on those affected and aiding law enforcement. The publisher would later cancel the three remaining Madden Classic qualifier tournaments in order to reevaluate safety protocols for future live events. EA further donated US$1 million as charity for the victims of the shooting and will set up a fund for others to be able to contribute.

Organizers of several video game-based exhibitions, including PAX, Game Developers Conference, Insomnia Gaming Festival and Electronic Entertainment Expo, as well as other esports tournaments such as the League of Legends Championship Series and Evolution Championship Series (EVO) announced that they would take additional security measures at their upcoming events to protect the safety of their exhibitors and attendees in wake of the shooting. The event has also raised concern about increasing security at other esports events in the future to levels similarly seen in other professional sporting events.

The BBC initial coverage of the shooting compared it to other shootings in the state of Florida, including the Stoneman Douglas High School shooting, the killings of Christina Grimmie, Trayvon Martin, and XXXTentacion, and the Orlando nightclub shooting. As the incident occurred 54 hours before the state polls closed in the gubernatorial primary elections, the political and gun law ramifications became political talking points.

U.S. President Donald Trump contacted Florida Governor Rick Scott, offering federal assistance in response to the shooting.

A 23-year-old Minnesota man who operated a Reddit account named "Ravenchamps" was subjected to a harassment campaign by QAnon and Trump supporters after far-right conspiracy theorist websites InfoWars and The Gateway Pundit, as well as far right commentator Mike Cernovich and Daily Caller contributor Ian Miles Cheong, misidentified him as the suspect and highlighted several anti-Trump statements made under his moniker. In response the owner made fun of the users of the QAnon-affiliated subreddit r/GreatAwakening, telling them "Y'all are seriously some bad researchers," and held an "Ask me Anything". He told The Washington Post that he did not receive any threats and that he was taking the campaign in stride. The Gateway Pundit subsequently posted a retraction to its article.

On August 26, 2023, a man shot and killed three people at a Dollar General store in Jacksonville. Investigators stated they believed the date was chosen due to being the fifth anniversary of this shooting.

=== Memorials and tributes ===
Video game developer Bungie issued a statement that all its "Bungie and Destiny channels" would observe a day of silence in memory of the victims on August 27, 2018. Bethesda, a major video game publisher, also issued its condolences, stating that it will "support efforts from the @EA family however [it] can." OpTic Gaming announced shortly after that it will be holding a charity livestream on August 31, 2018, with all proceeds going towards the families of the victims. GLHF also hosted a vigil in front of the restaurant doors, which was attended by hundreds of people. Madden NFL 19 developer EA Sports released a statement the same day expressing its sympathies and stated that it was working with authorities to figure out what happened.

== See also ==
- 2023 Jacksonville shooting, a shooting that occurred exactly five years later
