= Asbury, West Virginia =

Unincorporated community in West Virginia, United States

- Unincorporated community
- Location within West Virginia Location within the United States
- Coordinates: 37°49′11″N 80°33′33″W
- Country: United States
- State: West Virginia
- County: Greenbrier
- Elevation: 2,110 ft (640 m)
- Time zone: UTC-5 (Eastern (EST))
  - Summer (DST): UTC-4 (EDT)
- ZIP code: 24916
- Area codes: 304 & 681
- GNIS feature ID: 1535036

Asbury is an unincorporated community in Greenbrier County, West Virginia, United States. Asbury is located on West Virginia Route 12, northeast of Alderson. Asbury has a post office with ZIP code 24916.

The community is named for Francis Asbury.
