= West Virginia Route 63 =

State highway in West Virginia, United States

West Virginia Route 63

Route information
- Maintained by WVDOH
- Length: 21.5 mi (34.6 km)

Major junctions
- West end: WV 12 in Alderson
- US 219 near Ronceverte
- East end: US 60 in Caldwell

Location
- Country: United States
- State: West Virginia
- Counties: Greenbrier

Highway system
- West Virginia State Highway System; Interstate; US; State
← WV 62	→ I-64

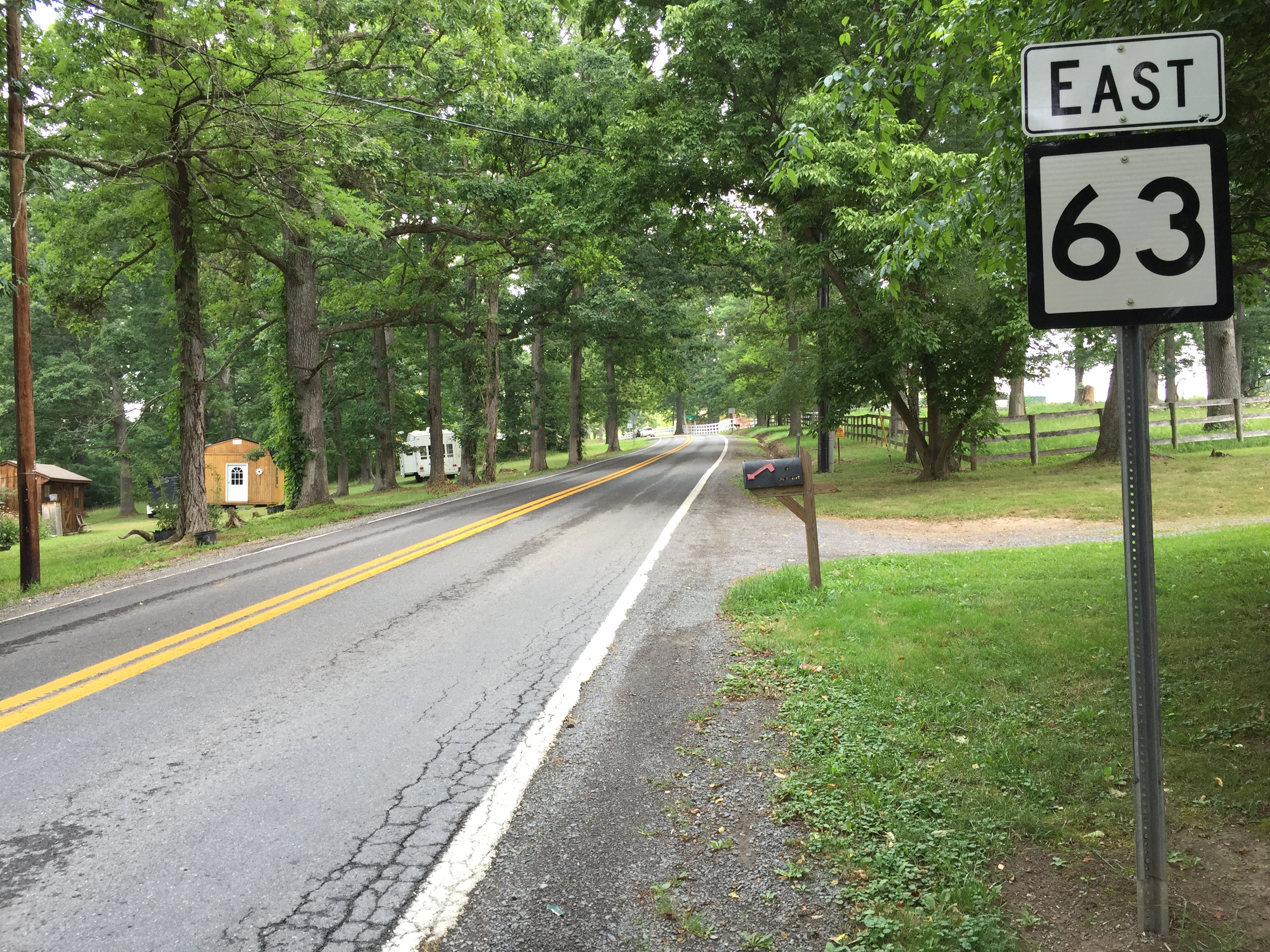
View east along WV 63 at US 219 in Organ Cave

West Virginia Route 63 is an east–west state highway located within Greenbrier County, West Virginia. The western terminus of the route is at West Virginia Route 12 in Alderson. The eastern terminus is at U.S. Route 60 in Caldwell. From Alderson to Ronceverte, it is known as the Highland Trail.

Route 63 is concurrent with U.S. Route 219 from Ronceverte to near Organ Cave. It crosses the Greenbrier River during this concurrency.

== Major intersections ==
The entire route is in Greenbrier County.

Location	mi	km	Destinations	Notes
Alderson			WV 12 – Pence Springs, Talcott, Alta	
Ronceverte			US 219 north – Lewisburg	west end of US 219 overlap
Organ Cave			US 219 south – Rich Creek, VA	east end of US 219 overlap
Caldwell			US 60 – Lewisburg, White Sulphur Springs	
1.000 mi = 1.609 km; 1.000 km = 0.621 mi: Concurrency terminus
