= Brookside, West Virginia =

Unincorporated community in West Virginia, United States

- Unincorporated community
- Location within West Virginia Location within the United States
- Coordinates: 39°19′33″N 79°31′35″W
- Country: United States
- State: West Virginia
- County: Preston
- Elevation: 2,507 ft (764 m)
- Time zone: UTC-5 (Eastern (EST))
  - Summer (DST): UTC-4 (EDT)
- Area codes: 304 & 681
- GNIS feature ID: 1550480

Brookside is an unincorporated community in Preston County, West Virginia, United States. Brookside is located at the junction of U.S. Route 50 and West Virginia Route 24, 7.9 miles (12.7 km) east-southeast of Rowlesburg.
