= Raines Corner, West Virginia =

- Unincorporated community
- Location within West Virginia Location within the United States
- Coordinates: 37°31′07″N 80°37′02″W
- Country: United States
- State: West Virginia
- County: Monroe
- Elevation: 1,699 ft (518 m)
- Time zone: UTC-5 (Eastern (EST))
  - Summer (DST): UTC-4 (EDT)
- Area codes: 304 & 681
- GNIS feature ID: 1555436

Raines Corner is an unincorporated community in Monroe County, West Virginia, United States. Raines Corner is located at the intersection of U.S. Route 219 and West Virginia Route 122, southwest of Union.
