= Organ Cave, West Virginia =

- Unincorporated community
- Location within West Virginia Location within the United States
- Coordinates: 37°42′46″N 80°26′28″W
- Country: United States
- State: West Virginia
- County: Greenbrier
- Elevation: 2,178 ft (664 m)
- Time zone: UTC-5 (Eastern (EST))
  - Summer (DST): UTC-4 (EDT)
- Area codes: 304 & 681
- GNIS feature ID: 1555270

Organ Cave is an unincorporated community in Greenbrier County, West Virginia, United States. Organ Cave is located along U.S. Route 219 and West Virginia Route 63 at the Organ Cave, 4 miles (6.4 km) southeast of Ronceverte.

As might seem obvious from the name of the town, the principal attraction here is Organ Cave, the ninth longest mapped cave in the United States. Organ Cave was mined for saltpeter, the principal ingredient of gunpowder, during the Revolutionary War, the War of 1812, and the Civil War. Confederate General Robert E. Lee and his troops held a church service in the main entrance room of the cave during the war. Remains of the Civil War mining are in an excellent state of preservation and are seen on the commercial tour.

The early saltpeter miners discovered the bones of a large, unknown animal. The owner of the cave sent some of the bones (a forearm and a hand with giant claws) to Thomas Jefferson. Thomas Jefferson described them as "Megalonyx" (Greek for "Great Claw"). This was the first reported find of a giant ground sloth in the United States. This particular genus is now known as Megalonyx jeffersoni.

In 1973, the Organ Cave System was made a National Natural Landmark (NNL) by the U.S. National Park Service.
