= Barnettown, West Virginia =

Unincorporated community in West Virginia, United States

- Unincorporated community
- Location within West Virginia Location within the United States
- Coordinates: 37°41′51″N 80°40′37″W
- Country: United States
- State: West Virginia
- County: Summers
- Elevation: 1,572 ft (479 m)
- Time zone: UTC-5 (Eastern (EST))
  - Summer (DST): UTC-4 (EDT)
- Area codes: 304 & 681
- GNIS feature ID: 1553803

Barnettown is an unincorporated community in Summers County, West Virginia, United States. The community is located along the Greenbrier River, about 3 miles (4.8 km) south of Alderson. Barnettown is served by West Virginia routes 3 and 12.
