= Hilldale, West Virginia =

- Unincorporated community
- Location within West Virginia Location within the United States
- Coordinates: 37°38′16″N 80°47′14″W
- Country: United States
- State: West Virginia
- County: Summers
- Elevation: 1,690 ft (520 m)
- Time zone: UTC−5 (Eastern (EST))
  - Summer (DST): UTC−4 (EDT)
- Area codes: 304 & 681
- GNIS feature ID: 1554716

Hilldale is an unincorporated community in Summers County, West Virginia, United States. Hilldale is located on West Virginia Route 3 and West Virginia Route 12, east of Hinton.
