= Blaker Mills, West Virginia =

Unincorporated community in West Virginia, United States

- Unincorporated community
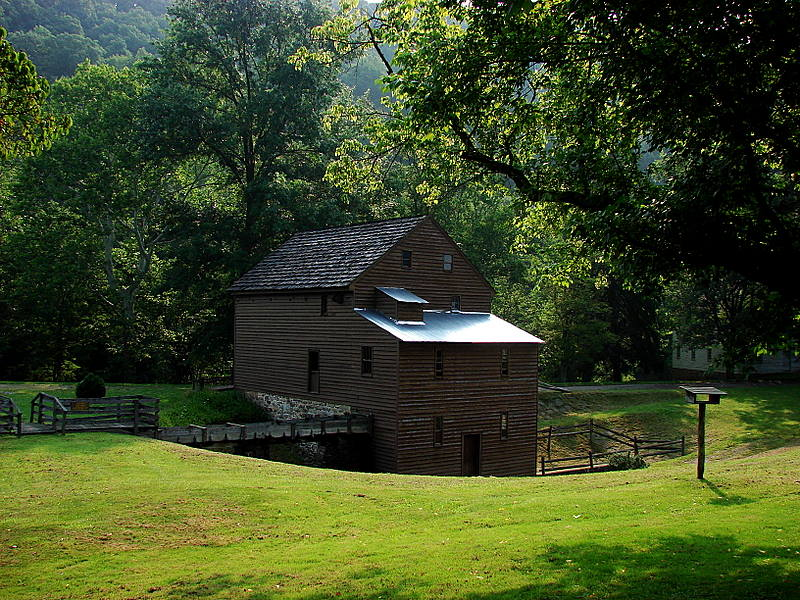
- Blaker's Mill

- Location within West Virginia Location within the United States
- Coordinates: 37°45′42″N 80°36′26″W
- Country: United States
- State: West Virginia
- County: Greenbrier
- Elevation: 1,686 ft (514 m)
- Time zone: UTC-5 (Eastern (EST))
  - Summer (DST): UTC-4 (EDT)
- Area codes: 304 & 681
- GNIS feature ID: 1549598

Blaker Mills is an unincorporated community in Greenbrier County, West Virginia, United States. Blaker Mills is located on West Virginia Route 12, northwest of Alderson.

The community was named for the local Blaker family.
