= Ballard, West Virginia =

Unincorporated community in West Virginia, United States

- Unincorporated community
- Location within West Virginia Location within the United States
- Coordinates: 37°28′29″N 80°46′45″W
- Country: United States
- State: West Virginia
- County: Monroe
- Elevation: 2,119 ft (646 m)
- Time zone: UTC-5 (Eastern (EST))
  - Summer (DST): UTC-4 (EDT)
- ZIP code: 24918
- Area codes: 304 & 681
- GNIS feature ID: 1550160

Ballard is an unincorporated community in Monroe County, West Virginia, United States. Ballard is located on West Virginia Route 12, north of Peterstown. Ballard has a post office with ZIP code 24918.

The community has the name of Clayton A. Ballard, an early storekeeper.

Ballard is home to Ballard Christian School, which was formed in 1977. The closest high school is James Monroe High, which serves all of Monroe County. The town is also home to a variety of churches and several small business.

The average temperature is approximately 51 °F, lower than the West Virginia average temperature of 53 °F.
