= Rock Camp, West Virginia =

- Unincorporated community
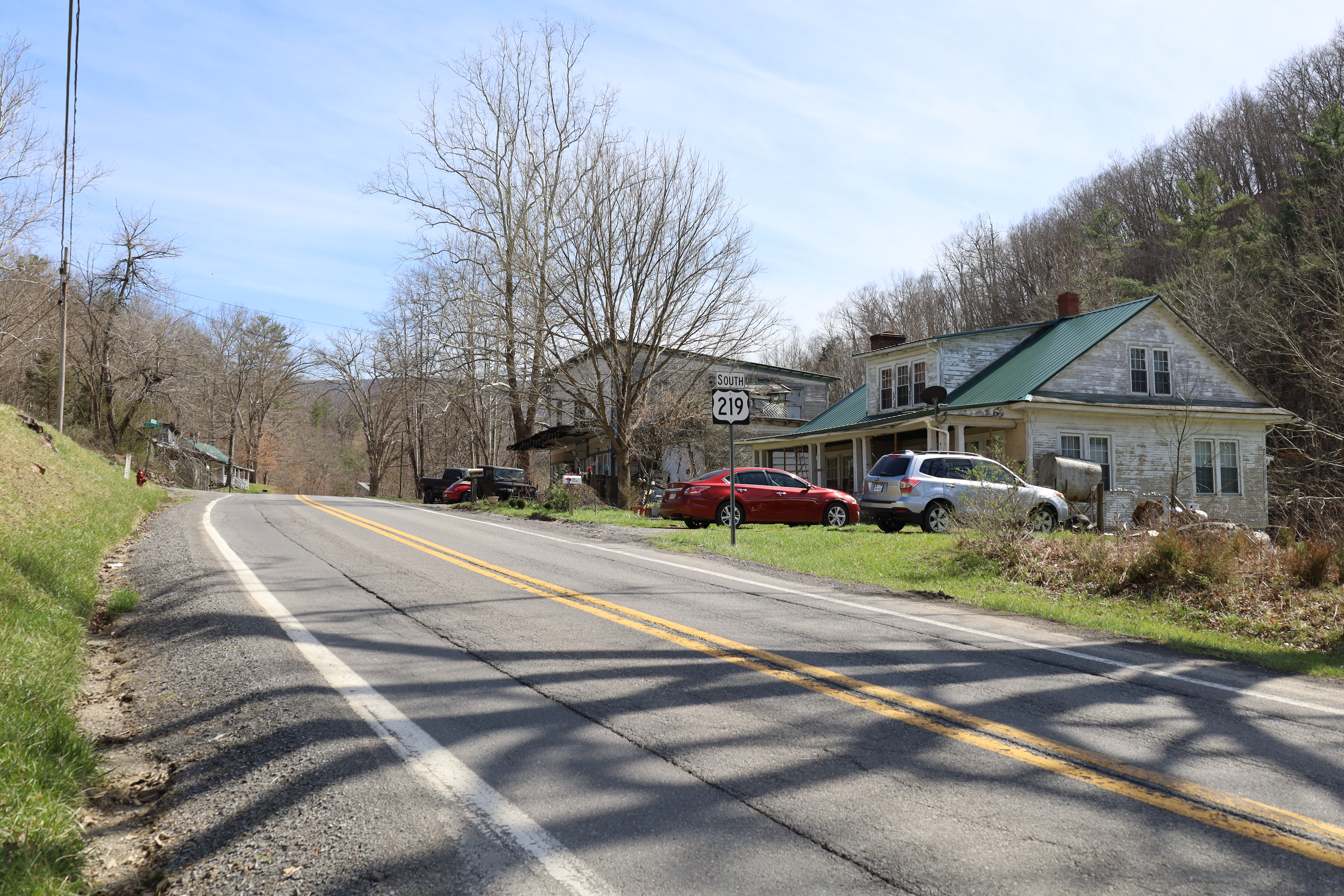
- View along U.S. Route 219 in Rock Camp in 2022

- Location within West Virginia Location within the United States
- Coordinates: 37°29′53″N 80°36′24″W
- Country: United States
- State: West Virginia
- County: Monroe
- Elevation: 1,818 ft (554 m)
- Time zone: UTC-5 (Eastern (EST))
  - Summer (DST): UTC-4 (EDT)
- Area codes: 304 & 681
- GNIS feature ID: 1555497

Rock Camp is an unincorporated community in Monroe County, West Virginia, United States. Rock Camp is located on U.S. Route 219, northeast of Peterstown and southwest of Union.

The community was named after nearby Rock Camp Creek.
