= Mount Vernon, West Virginia =

Mt. Vernon
- Unincorporated community
- Location within the state of West Virginia Mt. Vernon (the United States)
- Coordinates: 38°26′56″N 81°56′22″W
- Country: United States
- State: West Virginia
- County: Putnam
- Time zone: UTC-5 (Eastern (EST))
  - Summer (DST): UTC-4 (EDT)

Mt. Vernon is an unincorporated community in Putnam County, West Virginia, United States. It is part of the census-designated place of Teays Valley.

The community is centered on the intersection of Teays Valley Road and Mt. Vernon/Poplar Fork Road.
