= West Virginia Route 12 =

State highway in West Virginia, United States

West Virginia Route 12

Route information
- Maintained by WVDOH
- Length: 48.6 mi (78.2 km)

Major junctions
- South end: US 219 in Peterstown
- WV 122 in Forest Hill; WV 3 near Alderson; WV 63 in Alderson; I-64 near Alta
- North end: US 60 near Alta

Location
- Country: United States
- State: West Virginia
- Counties: Monroe, Summers, Greenbrier

Highway system
- West Virginia State Highway System; Interstate; US; State
← US 11	→ WV 14

West Virginia Route 12 (WV 12) is a north–south route located in the southern portion of the U.S. state of West Virginia. The southern terminus of the route is at U.S. Route 219 in Peterstown, Monroe County, less than 300 yards (270 m) from the Virginia state line. It compromises a portion of the Farm Heritage Road byway between Peterstown and West Virginia Route 122. The northern terminus of the route is at U.S. Route 60 in Alta, Greenbrier County, near Interstate 64 exit 161.

== Route description ==
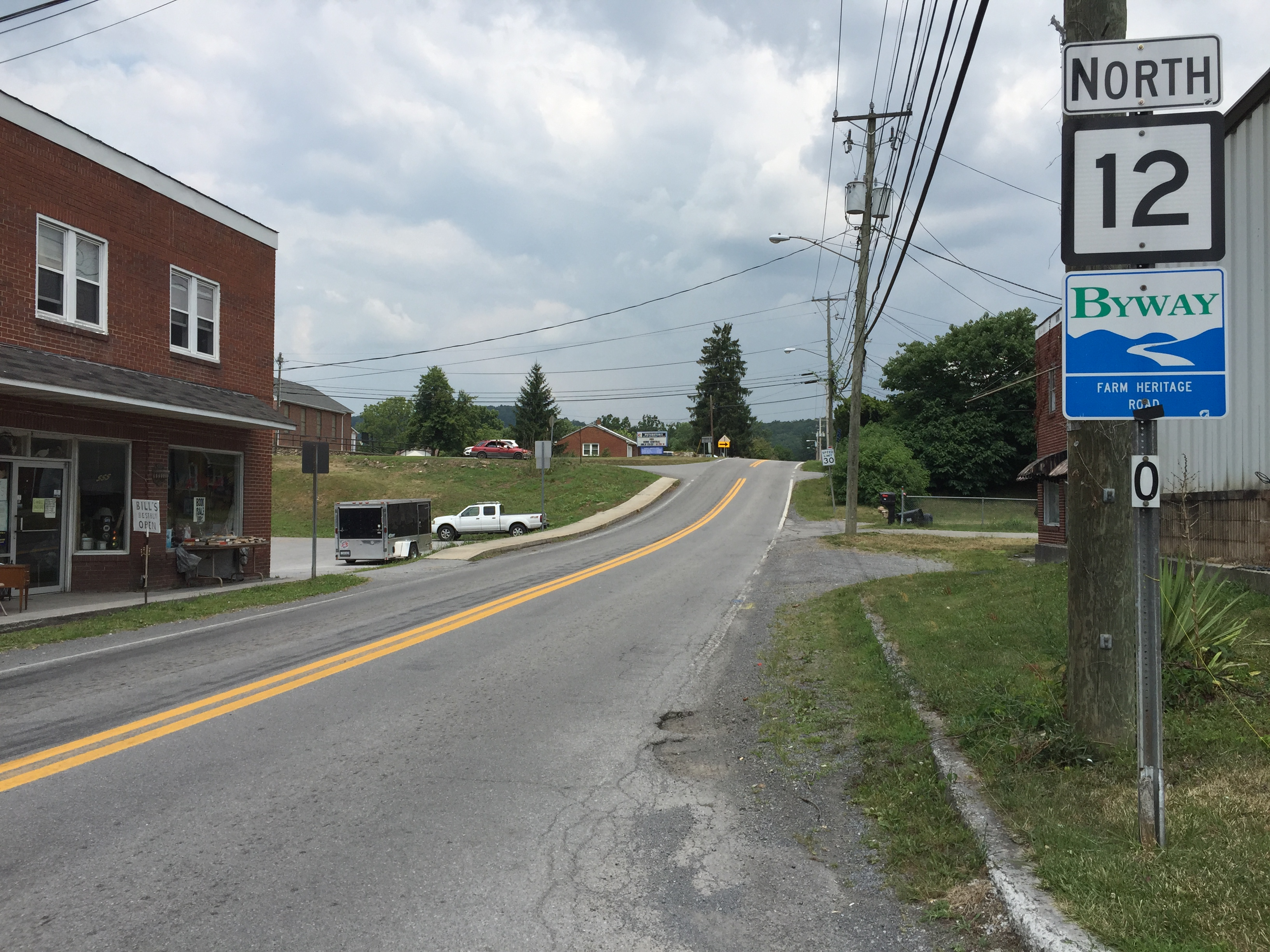
View north along WV 12 at US 219 in Peterstown

WV 12 begins at U.S. Route 219 in Peterstown. The route heads north through Peterstown and enters rural southwest Monroe County. Route 12 is part of the Farm Heritage Road, a West Virginia State Byway, from Peterstown to Forest Hill. It passes through the unincorporated communities of Cashmere, Ballard, and Red Sulphur Springs before entering Summers County.

Route 12 enters Forest Hill, where it meets West Virginia Route 122. The highway continues northward from Forest Hill, paralleling the Greenbrier River and passing Big Bend Mountain before it meets West Virginia Route 3 at Hilldale. At this junction, Route 12 forms a concurrency with WV 3, and the highways head east across the river. The routes run alongside the Greenbrier River again at Talcott and continue to Lowell before following the river north to Pence Springs. The routes then head northeast along the river through Barnettown before crossing into Greenbrier County. The two routes enter Alderson, where Route 3 leaves Route 12 to the south.

Route 12 continues east to West Virginia Route 63 at the eastern edge of Alderson, where it turns north. The route heads north through a mountainous area, passing through the communities of Blaker Mills and Asbury. It continues north to Alta, where it meets Interstate 64 at Exit 161 before terminating at U.S. Route 60.

== Major intersections ==
County	Location	mi	km	Destinations	Notes
Monroe	Peterstown	0.0	0.0	US 219	
Summers	Forest Hill	14.1	22.7	WV 122 east – Rock Camp	
Summers		20.7	33.3	WV 3 west – Hinton	South end of WV 3 overlap
Greenbrier	Alderson	36.4	58.6	WV 3 east – Union	North end of WV 3 overlap
Greenbrier	Alderson	36.9	59.4	WV 63 east – Ronceverte	
Greenbrier		48.2	77.6	I-64 – Beckley, Lewisburg	I-64 exit 161
Greenbrier		48.5	78.1	US 60	
1.000 mi = 1.609 km; 1.000 km = 0.621 mi: Concurrency terminus
