= Dropping Lick Creek =

Stream in West Virginia, USA

Coordinates: 37°29′54″N 80°36′30″W

Dropping Lick Creek is a stream in the U.S. state of West Virginia, probably named for a mineral lick near a waterfall.

== See also ==
- List of rivers of West Virginia
