= Silver Lake, West Virginia =

- Unincorporated community
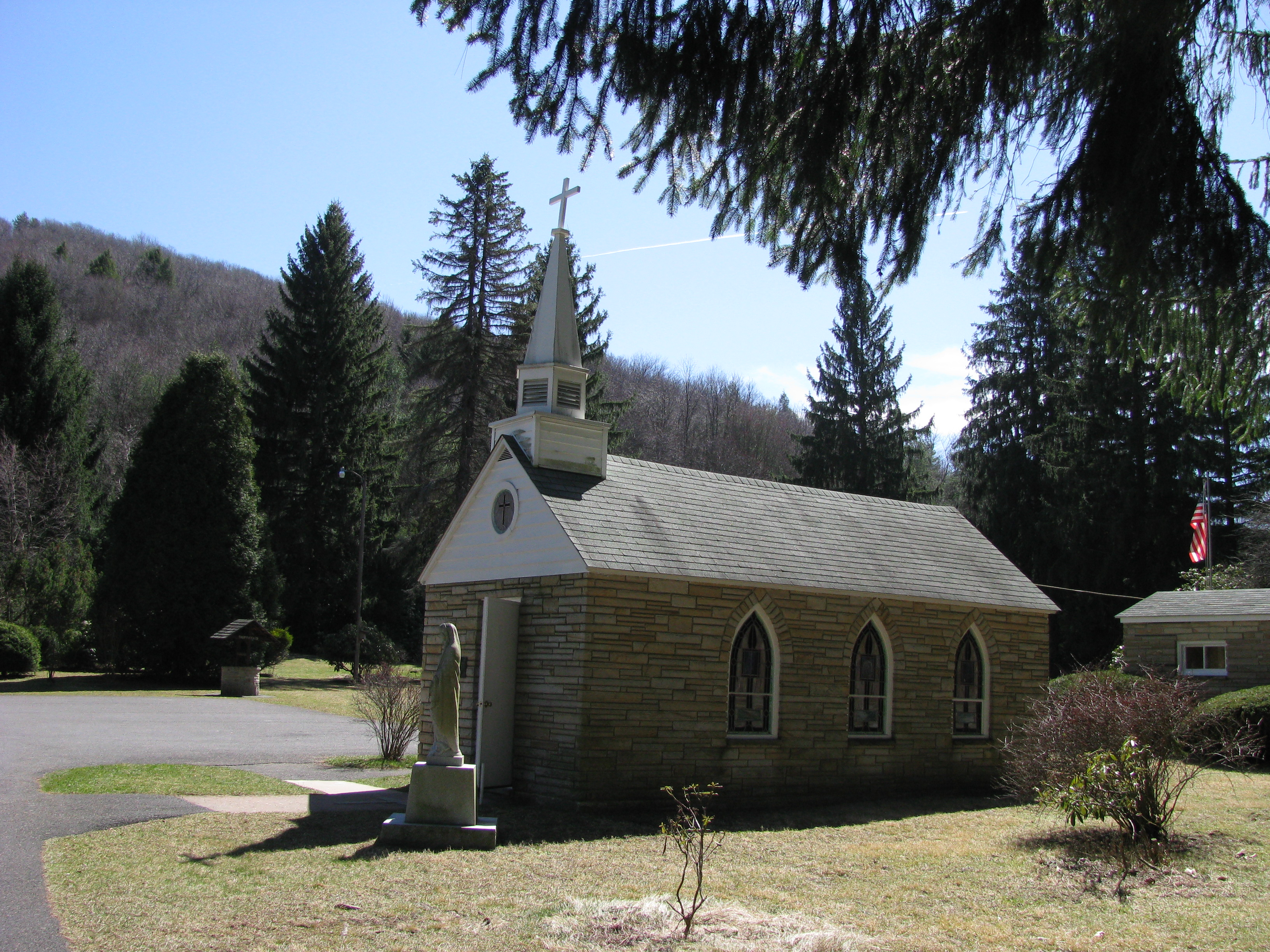
- Our Lady of the Pines Catholic Church

- Location within West Virginia Location within the United States
- Coordinates: 39°15′15″N 79°29′52″W
- Country: United States
- State: West Virginia
- County: Preston
- Elevation: 2,510 ft (770 m)
- Time zone: UTC-5 (Eastern (EST))
  - Summer (DST): UTC-4 (EDT)
- Area codes: 304 & 681
- GNIS feature ID: 1555626

Silver Lake is an unincorporated community in Preston County, West Virginia, United States. Silver Lake is located along U.S. Route 219, 7.5 miles (12.1 km) north of Thomas in Tucker County.

The community is named for a man-made lake of the same name, which is located within a private campground in the community. Built in 1928, the lake is retained by a small concrete splash dam and is located at the headwaters of the Youghiogheny River. The park and campground was also built in the 1930s, and was at one time one of the more popular vacation destinations in the area, featuring camping, boating, swimming, picknicking, a restaurant and game room, a small motel, and six small vacation cabins. The park's overnight facilities were particularly popular during the 1940s and early 1950s, prior to the development of rental cabins and a large lodge at nearby Blackwater Falls State Park, although the vacation cabins at Silver Lake were available for nightly rentals into the late 1990s. The restaurant closed in the early 2000s and today, the park is primarily a private campground, with many camping trailers permanently placed around the lake, and the cabins rented to monthly tenants.

The trailhead to Hoye-Crest, the highest point in Maryland, is just south of Silver Lake. Hoye-Crest, the summit of Backbone Mountain, lies along the eastern edge of the West Virginia–Maryland state line, while Silver Lake is just west of the border. The Hoye-Crest trail, a one-time logging road on private property, is about one mile (1.6 km) long with 700 feet (210 m) of elevation gain.

Our Lady of the Pines Catholic Church, proclaimed as the "smallest church in 48 states," is in Silver Lake. The church building is a 12 feet (3.7 m) × 24 feet (7.3 m) purpose built family church with an altar and 6 two-seat pews across an aisle. The church is located near unincorporated Horse Shoe Run and Eglon, WV. Adjacent to the church is "the world's smallest mailing office," a post office that is smaller than the church.

Prior to the construction of the lake in 1928, the area had been known as Breedlove. Breedlove was the southern terminus of the Preston Railroad, which hauled timber from the surrounding mountains to a large lumber mill in Crellin, Maryland. The railroad survived into the 1920s, and was last utilized to haul road construction materials for upgrades to US 219, which passes through the community. According to tradition, the community had been formerly named for John Breedlove, an early 19th-century soldier.
