= Alta, Greenbrier County, West Virginia =

Unincorporated community in West Virginia, United States

- Unincorporated community
- Location within West Virginia Location within the United States
- Coordinates: 37°52′10″N 80°32′34″W
- Country: United States
- State: West Virginia
- County: Greenbrier
- Elevation: 2,474 ft (754 m)
- Time zone: UTC-5 (Eastern (EST))
  - Summer (DST): UTC-4 (EDT)
- Area codes: 304 & 681
- GNIS feature ID: 1549562

Alta is an unincorporated community in Greenbrier County, West Virginia, United States. Alta is located at the junction of Interstate 64, U.S. Route 60 and West Virginia Route 12, northwest of Lewisburg.
