= Forest Hill, West Virginia =

Unincorporated community in West Virginia, United States

Forest Hill
- Unincorporated community
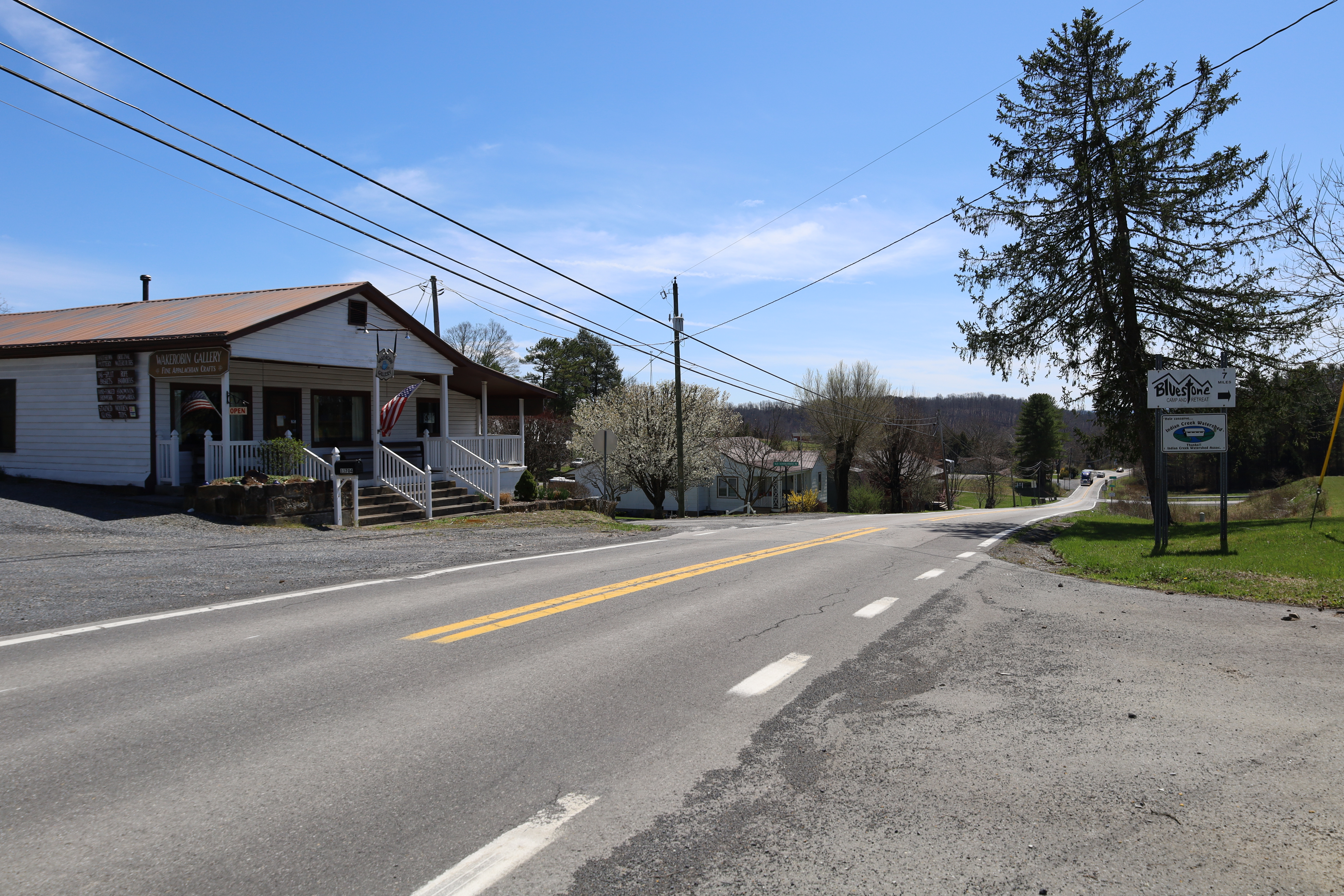
- Buildings along WV Route 12 in 2022

- Location within the state of West Virginia Forest Hill (the United States)
- Coordinates: 37°34′12″N 80°47′22″W
- Country: United States
- State: West Virginia
- County: Summers
- Time zone: UTC-5 (Eastern (EST))
  - Summer (DST): UTC-4 (EDT)
- ZIP codes: 24935

Forest Hill (also Foresthill) is an unincorporated community in Summers County, West Virginia, United States. It lies along West Virginia Route 12 to the southeast of the city of Hinton, the county seat of Summers County. Its elevation is 1,926 feet (587 m). It has a post office with the ZIP code 24935.

Forest Hill once contained a tobacco factory.
