= Peterstown, West Virginia =

- Town
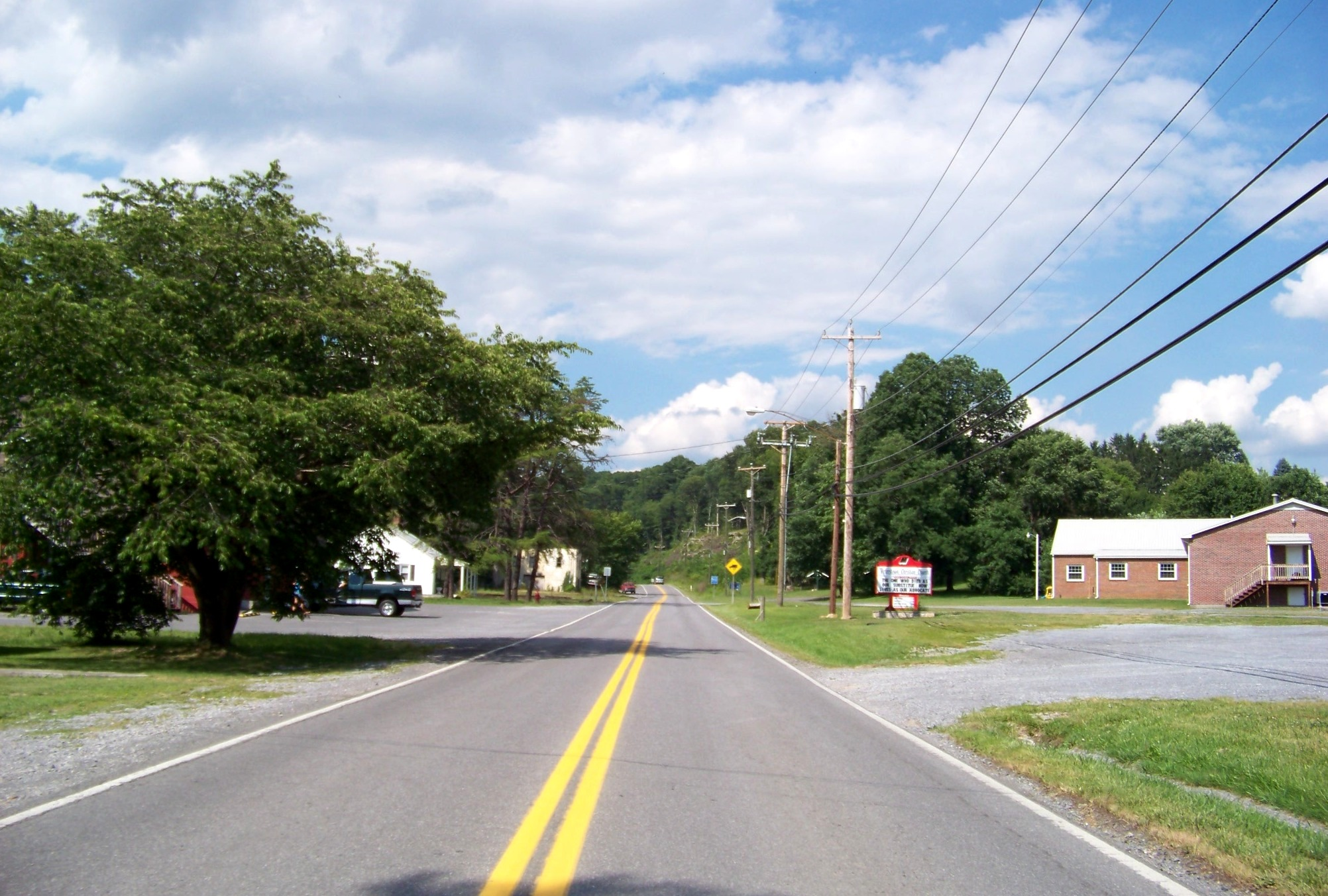
- Water Street in Peterstown

- Location of Peterstown in Monroe County, West Virginia.
- Coordinates: 37°23′55″N 80°47′42″W
- Country: United States
- State: West Virginia
- County: Monroe

Area
  - Total: 0.32 sq mi (0.82 km^{2})
  - Land: 0.32 sq mi (0.82 km^{2})
  - Water: 0 sq mi (0.00 km^{2})
- Elevation: 1,624 ft (495 m)

Population (2020)
  - Total: 448
  - Estimate (2021): 454
  - Density: 1,962.4/sq mi (757.68/km^{2})
- Time zone: UTC-5 (Eastern (EST))
  - Summer (DST): UTC-4 (EDT)
- ZIP code: 24963
- Area code: 304
- FIPS code: 54-63052
- GNIS feature ID: 1552465
- Website: local.wv.gov/peterstown/Pages/default.aspx

Peterstown is a town in Monroe County, West Virginia, United States. The population was 456 at the 2020 census.

The town was named after Christian Peters, a pioneer settler. The town is the site of the 1928 discovery of the 34.48 carat (6.896 g) Jones Diamond by Grover C. Jones and his son, William "Punch" Jones.

== Geography ==
Peterstown is located at 37°23′55″N 80°47′42″W (37.398638, -80.795102). It lies along the border with Virginia and is located directly across Rich Creek from Midway, Giles County, Virginia.

According to the United States Census Bureau, the town has a total area of 0.32 square miles (0.83 km^{2}), all land.

== Demographics ==
=== 2020 population ===
With a 2020 population of 617, it is the 139th biggest city in West Virginia and the 12416th largest city in the U.S. Peterstown is currently declining at a rate of -0.32% annually and its population has decreased by -5.51% since the most recent census, which recorded a population of 653 in 2010

=== 2010 census ===
At the 2010 census there were 653 people, 287 households, and 171 families living in the town. The population density was 2,040.6 inhabitants per square mile (787.9/km^{2}). There were 333 housing units at an average density of 1,040.6 per square mile (401.8/km^{2}). The racial makeup of the town was 97.9% White, 0.2% African American, 0.5% Native American, 0.5% from other races, and 1.1% from two or more races. Hispanic or Latino of any race were 0.6%.

Of the 287 households 31.4% had children under the age of 18 living with them, 38.0% were married couples living together, 14.3% had a female householder with no husband present, 7.3% had a male householder with no wife present, and 40.4% were non-families. 36.9% of households were one person and 21.9% were one person aged 65 or older. The average household size was 2.28 and the average family size was 2.93.

The median age in the town was 36.4 years. 24.8% of residents were under the age of 18; 6.7% were between the ages of 18 and 24; 27.6% were from 25 to 44; 20.6% were from 45 to 64; and 20.2% were 65 or older. The gender makeup of the town was 47.8% male and 52.2% female.

=== 2000 census ===
At the 2000 census there were 499 people, 253 households, and 138 families living in the town. The population density was 1,576.6 inhabitants per square mile (602.1/km^{2}). There were 276 housing units at an average density of 872.0 per square mile (333.0/km^{2}). The racial makeup of the town was 99.40% White, 0.20% from other races, and 0.40% from two or more races. Hispanic or Latino of any race were 1.00%.

Of the 253 households 19.8% had children under the age of 18 living with them, 41.1% were married couples living together, 9.5% had a female householder with no husband present, and 45.1% were non-families. 42.3% of households were one person and 24.9% were one person aged 65 or older. The average household size was 1.97 and the average family size was 2.65.

The age distribution was 18.8% under the age of 18, 7.2% from 18 to 24, 21.4% from 25 to 44, 26.9% from 45 to 64, and 25.7% 65 or older. The median age was 47 years. For every 100 females, there were 84.8 males. For every 100 females age 18 and over, there were 80.0 males.

The median household income was $23,036 and the median family income was $32,250. Males had a median income of $38,542 versus $20,577 for females. The per capita income for the town was $16,964. About 13.3% of families and 17.8% of the population were below the poverty line, including 21.7% of those under age 18 and 18.8% of those age 65 or over.
