= National Register of Historic Places listings in Harrison County, West Virginia =

Location of Harrison County in West Virginia

This is a list of the National Register of Historic Places listings in Harrison County, West Virginia.

This is intended to be a complete list of the properties and districts on the National Register of Historic Places in Harrison County, West Virginia, United States. The locations of National Register properties and districts for which the latitude and longitude coordinates are included below, may be seen in a Google map.

There are 22 properties and districts listed on the National Register in the county. Another property was once listed but has been removed.

This National Park Service list is complete through NPS recent listings posted September 12, 2025.

Contents: Counties in West Virginia

Barbour - Berkeley - Boone - Braxton - Brooke - Cabell - Calhoun - Clay - Doddridge - Fayette - Gilmer - Grant - Greenbrier - Hampshire - Hancock - Hardy - Harrison - Jackson - Jefferson - Kanawha - Lewis - Lincoln - Logan - Marion - Marshall - Mason - McDowell - Mercer - Mineral - Mingo - Monongalia - Monroe - Morgan - Nicholas - Ohio - Pendleton - Pleasants - Pocahontas - Preston - Putnam - Raleigh - Randolph - Ritchie - Roane - Summers - Taylor - Tucker - Tyler - Upshur - Wayne - Webster - Wetzel - Wirt - Wood - Wyoming

== Current listings ==
	Name on the Register	Image	Date listed	Location	City or town	Description
1	Daniel Bassel House	Daniel Bassel House	August 22, 2002 (#02000898)	County Route 25, south of its junction with WV 270; 39°09′40″N 80°21′11″W	Lost Creek	
2	Bridgeport Lamp Chimney Company Bowstring Concrete Arch Bridge	Bridgeport Lamp Chimney Company Bowstring Concrete Arch Bridge	January 27, 1997 (#96001571)	Between Mechanic St. and Baltimore & Ohio railroad tracks 39°17′03″N 80°15′22″W	Bridgeport	
3	Clarksburg Downtown Historic District	Clarksburg Downtown Historic District	April 12, 1982 (#82004794)	Roughly bounded by Elk, Creek, 7th, and Main Sts. 39°16′47″N 80°20′22″W	Clarksburg	
4	Edgewood Manor		July 6, 2005 (#05000662)	0.25 miles north of U.S. Route 50 interchange on U.S. Route 19; 39°18′28″N 80°21′05″W	Clarksburg	
5	Fletcher Covered Bridge	Fletcher Covered Bridge	June 4, 1981 (#81000601)	County Route 5/29 at junction of County Route 5; 39°18′20″N 80°28′49″W	Maken	
6	Glen Elk Historic District	Glen Elk Historic District	November 24, 1993 (#93001232)	Roughly bounded by Elk Creek and the Baltimore & Ohio railroad tracks 39°17′03″N 80°20′20″W	Clarksburg	
7	Indian Cave Petroglyphs		March 16, 1976 (#76001937)	Address Restricted	Good Hope	
8	Governor Joseph Johnson House	Governor Joseph Johnson House	March 19, 1987 (#87000490)	424 Oakdale Ave. 39°17′07″N 80°15′32″W	Bridgeport	
9	Lost Creek Baltimore and Ohio Railroad Depot	Lost Creek Baltimore and Ohio Railroad Depot	July 6, 2005 (#05000660)	Main St., Lost Creek Rd., and County Route 48; 39°09′37″N 80°21′06″W	Lost Creek	
10	Kelly Miller School		November 12, 2024 (#100011002)	408 E.B. Saunders Way; 39°16′36″N 80°20′09″W	Clarksburg	
11	Quality Hill Historic District	Quality Hill Historic District	August 22, 1985 (#85001815)	East Main St. 39°16′43″N 80°19′55″W	Clarksburg	
12	Quiet Dell School	Quiet Dell School	March 12, 2001 (#01000265)	Off WV 20 on County Route 20/79; 39°13′26″N 80°18′00″W	Mount Clare	
13	Salem College Administration Building	Salem College Administration Building	March 30, 1989 (#89000184)	223 W. Main St. 39°17′01″N 80°34′02″W	Salem	
14	Salem Historic District	Salem Historic District	December 2, 1980 (#80004022)	WV 23; 39°16′58″N 80°33′32″W	Salem	
15	Levi Shinn House	Levi Shinn House	July 16, 1973 (#73001907)	Clarksburg Rd. (U.S. Route 19); 39°23′13″N 80°18′40″W	Shinnston	
16	Shinnston Historic District	Shinnston Historic District	April 1, 1998 (#98000288)	Roughly bounded by Charles, East, and Clement Sts., and West Fork River; 39°23′45″N 80°18′03″W	Shinnston	
17	Simpson Creek Covered Bridge	Simpson Creek Covered Bridge	June 4, 1981 (#81000600)	County Route 24/2 at junction of County Route 24; 39°18′31″N 80°16′47″W	Bridgeport	
18	Watters Smith Farm on Duck Creek	Watters Smith Farm on Duck Creek	May 16, 1974 (#74002003)	County Route 25/6; 39°10′12″N 80°24′38″W	Lost Creek	
19	Stealey-Goff-Vance House	Stealey-Goff-Vance House	September 25, 1979 (#79002580)	123 W. Main St. 39°16′42″N 80°20′09″W	Clarksburg	
20	Templemoor	Templemoor	April 15, 1982 (#82004318)	WV 20; 39°08′41″N 80°14′27″W	Clarksburg	
21	Trinity Memorial Methodist Episcopal Church	Trinity Memorial Methodist Episcopal Church	April 26, 1984 (#84003584)	420 Ben St. 39°16′37″N 80°20′11″W	Clarksburg	Demolished
22	Waldomore	Waldomore	October 4, 1978 (#78002797)	W. Pike and N. 4th Sts. 39°16′54″N 80°20′25″W	Clarksburg	

== Former listing ==
	Name on the Register	Image	Date listed	Date removed	Location	City or town	Description
1	Nathan Goff Jr. House		December 12, 1976 (#76001936)	February 18, 1994	463 W. Main St. 39°16′48″N 80°20′32″W	Clarksburg	Demolished in 1993. Included in Clarksburg Downtown Historic District.

== See also ==
- List of National Historic Landmarks in West Virginia
- National Register of Historic Places listings in West Virginia
