= Quality Hill =

Quality Hill or Quality Hill Historic District may refer to:

- Quality Hill Historic District (Denver, Colorado), a Denver Landmark
- Quality Hill, Kansas City, a neighborhood
- Quality Hill Historic District (Pawtucket, Rhode Island), listed on the NRHP in Rhode Island
- Quality Hill, Washington, D.C., a historic building in the Georgetown neighborhood of Washington, DC
- Quality Hill Historic District (Clarksburg, West Virginia), listed on the NRHP in West Virginia
