= National Register of Historic Places listings in Pleasants County, West Virginia =

Location of Pleasants County in West Virginia

This is a list of the National Register of Historic Places listings in Pleasants County, West Virginia.

This is intended to be a complete list of the properties and districts on the National Register of Historic Places in Pleasants County, West Virginia, United States. The locations of National Register properties and districts for which the latitude and longitude coordinates are included below, may be seen in a Google map.

There are 2 properties listed on the National Register in the county.

This National Park Service list is complete through NPS recent listings posted March 21, 2025.

Contents: Counties in West Virginia

Barbour - Berkeley - Boone - Braxton - Brooke - Cabell - Calhoun - Clay - Doddridge - Fayette - Gilmer - Grant - Greenbrier - Hampshire - Hancock - Hardy - Harrison - Jackson - Jefferson - Kanawha - Lewis - Lincoln - Logan - Marion - Marshall - Mason - McDowell - Mercer - Mineral - Mingo - Monongalia - Monroe - Morgan - Nicholas - Ohio - Pendleton - Pleasants - Pocahontas - Preston - Putnam - Raleigh - Randolph - Ritchie - Roane - Summers - Taylor - Tucker - Tyler - Upshur - Wayne - Webster - Wetzel - Wirt - Wood - Wyoming

== Current listings ==
	Name on the Register	Image	Date listed	Location	City or town	Description
1	Cain House	Cain House	June 25, 1980 (#80004037)	Creel St. and Riverside Dr. 39°23′20″N 81°12′34″W	St. Marys	
2	Pleasants County Courthouse	Pleasants County Courthouse	August 25, 2004 (#04000917)	301 Court Ln. 39°23′19″N 81°12′17″W	St. Marys	

== See also ==
- List of National Historic Landmarks in West Virginia
- National Register of Historic Places listings in West Virginia
