= Waldo Hotel =

Hotel in West Virginia, United States

- Waldo Hotel in 2015

General information
- Location: Clarksburg, West Virginia, 300 West Pike Street, Clarksburg, WV
- Coordinates: 39.280786°N 80.340112°W
- Opening: 1904
- Closed: 1962 (as hotel)
- Cost: $400,000.00
- Owner: Nathan Goff, Jr.

Height
- Height: 100 m (330 ft)

Technical details
- Floor count: 7
- Floor area: over 7,200 sqft

Design and construction
- Architect: Harrison Albright

Other information
- Number of rooms: over 70
- Waldo Hotel
- U.S. Historic district – Contributing property
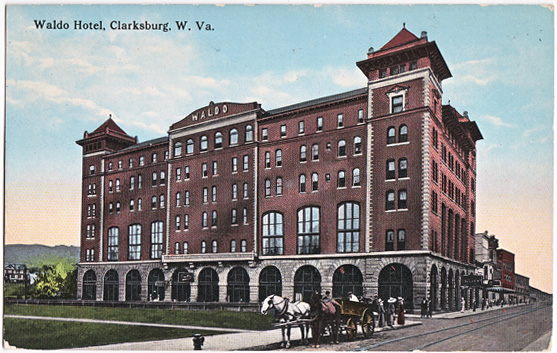
- Waldo Hotel in 1914
- Architectural style: Moorish Revival
- Part of: Clarksburg Downtown Historic District (ID82004794)
- Designated CP: February 17, 1982

The Waldo Hotel in Clarksburg, West Virginia was built between 1901 and 1904 by real estate developer, U.S. Senator, Congressman, judge, lawyer, and Republican Party leader Nathan Goff, Jr. Built right across from his family home which is also still standing and currently used as a library called Waldomore, and named for his father, Waldo P. Goff. Clarksburg was experiencing a period of rapid growth in the late 19th and early 20th centuries, driven by the booming coal industry. Goff Jr. saw the hotel as a way to attract new businesses and residents to the city, further solidifying its position as a regional hub. Goff Jr. was a man of considerable wealth and ambition. He envisioned the Waldo Hotel as a symbol of his own success and a testament to his family's legacy in Clarksburg. Clarksburg lacked a large, upscale hotel to accommodate its growing business traveler population and social events. The Waldo Hotel was designed to fill this gap and provide a luxurious venue for meetings, banquets, and other gatherings.

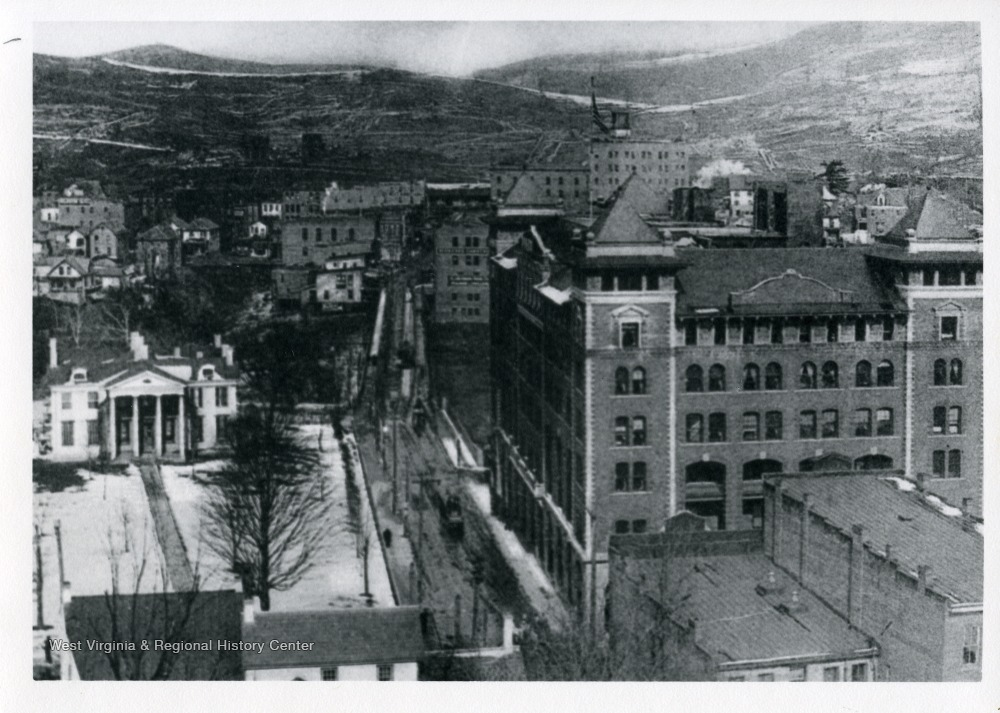
The Waldomore and The Waldo Hotel

== Design and Construction ==
The Waldo was designed by American Architect Harrison Albright, a seven-story brick and terra-cotta structure, rose in Clarksburg, West Virginia, in 1904. Construction, spearheaded by developer Nathan Goff Jr., began in 1902 and spanned over two years at a cost of over $400,000.

The Beaux-Arts style heavily influenced the hotel's design, evident in its symmetrical facade, prominent corner tower, and classical architectural elements. Red brick formed the building's core, while cream-colored terra-cotta accents provided decorative flourishes and window surrounds. Modern engineering techniques were employed, with a steel frame supporting the structure. The first floor housed a bank and shops, integrating the hotel into the city's commercial fabric. Once one of the state's most luxurious hotels and the social center of Clarksburg, the Waldo Hotel was a gathering place for parties, weddings, and civic meetings.

=== Interior Details ===
In 1904, the Waldo Hotel's lobby was approximately 60 feet long and had 31-foot ceilings. The lobby featured a mosaic tile floor, a crystal chandelier, and ten marble columns decorated with ivory and gold accents. The ceiling contained ornate plasterwork with Beaux-Arts motifs. The reception desk was made of mahogany and was accompanied by brass lamps and portraits of local figures. The lobby also included a fireplace with a carved marble mantel.

Guest rooms are spacious with high ceilings and large windows with velvet curtains. The rooms also included armchairs and sofas, mahogany furniture, and beds adorned with headboards and linens.

Beyond the individual rooms, the Waldo unveiled further layers of its opulence. A grand ballroom with oak parquet floor. A library, private dining rooms, and state-of-the-art amenities like electric lighting and an ice plant.

== History ==
- Guy D. Goff, the son of Nathan, occupied a suite of rooms on the 4th floor as his official residence and offices during his term in United States Senate 1925-1931.
- The Waldo served as the meeting place for a group of conservative United States Senators that wanted to block the nomination of Herbert Hoover and elevate Guy D. Goff. This movement did not gain momentum, but Goff did receive 18 votes at the 1928 Republican National Convention.

=== Hotel Closing ===
In 1962, the Waldo Hotel's era of grandeur drew to a close as a hotel. Economic pressures and shifting travel patterns altered the landscape of Clarksburg, impacting the hotel's viability. The doors were subsequently closed. Over the years, it was still used for other businesses and residential up until at least the early 1990s.

=== Salem College ===
In 1964, Salem College, a recently accredited institution, embarked on a bold expansion by acquiring the historic Waldo Hotel in Clarksburg, West Virginia. This marked a significant step from its humble beginnings in the city, having previously operated out of a small donated building on West Pike Street since 1958. Seeking a larger and more versatile space, Salem College further bolstered its presence in Clarksburg over the next few years. In 1965, it secured the Carmichael Auditorium for athletic activities, and in 1966, it purchased the Carmichael and Mitchell Building on Sixth Street. The Mitchell Building was transformed into a dedicated science department, while the Carmichael Building's basement housed classrooms and its first floor was repurposed as a library. The Waldo Hotel's tenure as Salem College's Clarksburg hub was relatively short-lived. By December 1969, the college had ceased using the building and transitioned to its other acquired facilities.

== The Waldo Today ==
=== Vandalia Heritage Foundation ===
The building is currently owned by the Vandalia Heritage Foundation a 501(c)(3) Incorporated in 1998 in West Virginia. The Vandalia Heritage Foundation is a non-profit organization dedicated to revitalizing communities and neighborhoods in West Virginia through historic preservation and redevelopment. They have restored several iconic landmarks in the state, including the 1901 Buxton & Landstreet Building, High Gate Carriage House, Wheeling’s Historic Neighborhoods, Grafton B&O Station, and The Peacock Building.

=== The City of Clarksburg considers demolition ===
The City of Clarksburg's position on the Waldo Hotel's future is complex, with valid concerns driving their perspective. They see the building's current state as a serious safety hazard, with potential for falling debris endangering pedestrians and nearby structures. The financial burden of ongoing maintenance and potential liability associated with a deteriorating landmark also weighs heavily in their decision-making process. Additionally, some within the city government believe that demolishing the Waldo could free up valuable land for revitalization projects, potentially boosting Clarksburg's economic prospects. While their position may seem drastic, it stems from a desire to prioritize safety, fiscal responsibility, and a vision for the city's future development. The main thing protecting the Waldo is the extremely high cost of demolition.

=== Renovation ===
In May 2026, plans to renovate the building into 80 apartment units were reported.
