= National Register of Historic Places listings in Clay County, West Virginia =

Location of Clay County in West Virginia

This is a list of the National Register of Historic Places listings in Clay County, West Virginia.

This is intended to be a complete list of the properties and districts on the National Register of Historic Places in Clay County, West Virginia, United States. The locations of National Register properties and districts for which the latitude and longitude coordinates are included below, may be seen in a Google map.

There is 1 property listed on the National Register in the county.

This National Park Service list is complete through NPS recent listings posted December 12, 2025.

Contents: Counties in West Virginia

Barbour - Berkeley - Boone - Braxton - Brooke - Cabell - Calhoun - Clay - Doddridge - Fayette - Gilmer - Grant - Greenbrier - Hampshire - Hancock - Hardy - Harrison - Jackson - Jefferson - Kanawha - Lewis - Lincoln - Logan - Marion - Marshall - Mason - McDowell - Mercer - Mineral - Mingo - Monongalia - Monroe - Morgan - Nicholas - Ohio - Pendleton - Pleasants - Pocahontas - Preston - Putnam - Raleigh - Randolph - Ritchie - Roane - Summers - Taylor - Tucker - Tyler - Upshur - Wayne - Webster - Wetzel - Wirt - Wood - Wyoming

== Current listings ==
	Name on the Register	Image	Date listed	Location	City or town	Description
1	Old Clay County Courthouse	Old Clay County Courthouse	April 20, 1979 (#79002573)	Main St. 38°27′37″N 81°05′00″W	Clay	

== See also ==
- List of National Historic Landmarks in West Virginia
- National Register of Historic Places listings in West Virginia
