= Italian Heritage Festival =

Coordinates: 39°16′45″N 80°20′20″W

The West Virginia Italian Heritage Festival is an annual three-day street festival held in downtown Clarksburg, West Virginia, over Labor Day weekend. First held in 1979, the festival was established to celebrate West Virginia's Italian-American culture. Its events have included a parade, street concerts, Italian food, cultural events, crafts, bocce, morra, and the crowning of a festival queen.

== History ==
Italian immigrants were the most numerous ethnic group to arrive in West Virginia during the large-scale immigration associated with the state's industrialization. Clarksburg remains one of the centers of Italian-American population in West Virginia. The first West Virginia Italian Heritage Festival was held in downtown Clarksburg in 1979. The idea for the festival was proposed by the director of the local public library, and a board of directors consisting largely of citizens of Italian descent was formed. The festival was established to celebrate Italian-American culture in West Virginia and recognize the contributions of early Italian immigrants.

The founding group included Louis Spatafore, Sam Chico, Sam D'Annunzio, Frank Iaquinta, James D. Larosa, John Manchin, and Alma "Merle" Moore, who was the Harrison County Public Library director at the time.

The first festival included a parade, street concerts, Italian food, art shows and opera, crafts, bocce, Morra (game), golf, and the crowning of a festival queen. Joe DiMaggio and West Virginia Governor Jay Rockefeller participated in the first festival parade and rode together in a car.

In 2020, the 42nd festival was held virtually from September 4 to 6 because of restrictions related to the COVID-19 pandemic.

== Festival ==
The festival is held in downtown Clarksburg each Labor Day weekend, beginning on Friday and concluding on Sunday. Regular festival activities have included a parade, street concerts, Italian food, cultural events, crafts, bocce, morra, golf, and the crowning of a festival queen.

=== Performers ===
Past performers have included Jerry Vale, Frankie Avalon, Tony Danza, Kathy Mattea, Jo Dee Messina, Steve Augeri, and Joey Dee and the Starliters.

== Honorees ==
The festival recognizes Italian-American and honorary Italian men and women of the year. The following recipients are listed by the festival through 2026.

=== Italian-American men of the year ===
- 1980 – Nicholas T. Camicia
- 1981 – Dr. Jay Arena
- 1982 – Leo Vecellio
- 1983 – Capt. Tom Paul Scott, USN
- 1984 – Dr. K. Alvin Merendino
- 1985 – Robert DeProspero
- 1986 – Lt. Gen. Leonard H. Perroots
- 1987 – Michael C. Paterno
- 1988 – Joseph Antonini
- 1989 – Rear Admiral Thomas Lopez
- 1990 – Larry Ciccarelli
- 1991 – Brig. Gen. Tom Mancinelli
- 1992 – Dr. Thomas Mazzocco
- 1993 – Angelo S. Petitto
- 1994 – Augustine A. Mazzei, Jr.
- 1995 – Joseph L. Tropea
- 1996 – Frank A. Oliverio
- 1997 – Larry Argiro
- 1998 – Joseph F. Fuscaldo
- 1999 – Andrew J. Paterno
- 2000 – Lucius Cavallero
- 2001 – Victor Basile
- 2002 – Father Hilarion Cann
- 2003 – A. James Manchin
- 2004 – Russell Bonasso & Samuel Bonasso
- 2005 – Carmine J. Cann
- 2006 – Joseph M. Minard
- 2007 – Leonard J. "Joe" Trupo & Louis J. "Zeke" Trupo
- 2008 – Michael A. Oliverio
- 2009 – Governor Joe Manchin III
- 2010 – Donald J. Adams & Robert Adams
- 2011 – Mike Ross
- 2012 – Frank Gabor
- 2013 – Joe Retton
- 2014 – Anthony Bellotte
- 2015 – Major General James A. Hoyer
- 2016 – John "Sheriff" Tiano
- 2017 – Senator Roman W. Prezioso, Jr.
- 2018 – Dr. Norman Ferrari, III
- 2019 – Dr. Robert J. Beto, Jr.
- 2022 – Dr. Michael Edmond
- 2023 – Sheriff Robert Matheny
- 2024 – Robert Tinnell
- 2025 – Joseph Rocky Romano
- 2026 – Father Patsy Iaquinta

=== Honorary Italian men of the year ===
- 1979 – Senator Jennings Randolph & John D. Rockefeller, IV
- 1980 – James Compton
- 1981 – Odus Kincaid
- 1982 – Msgr. Benjamin Farrell
- 1983 – Frank Maxwell
- 1984 – Gov. John D. Rockefeller
- 1985 – Gov. Arch A. Moore, Jr.
- 1986 – US Senator Robert Byrd
- 1987 – John Williams
- 1988 – Jon A. McBride
- 1989 – Gov. Gaston Caperton
- 1990 – Msgr. John O'Reilly
- 1991 – Thomas C. Burns
- 1992 – Sam Huff
- 1993 – Milan Puskar
- 1994 – Judge Callie I. Tsapis
- 1996 – Father Charles McCallister
- 1997 – Governor Cecil H. Underwood
- 1998 – Ed Pastilong
- 1999 – Bishop Bernard W. Schmitt
- 2000 – Leland Byrd
- 2001 – Daniel McCarthy, Circuit Judge (Ret.)
- 2002 – Governor Bob Wise
- 2003 – I.L. "Ike" Morris
- 2004 – Alan Mollohan
- 2005 – Dr. Kelley Nelson
- 2006 – James. C. Hunt
- 2007 – Harry Green, Jr.
- 2008 – Dr. Julian Bailes
- 2009 – Mr. Michael Belmear
- 2010 – Don Hamilton
- 2011 – Jim Justice
- 2012 – Tommy Thomas
- 2013 – John Ebert
- 2014 – Dr. Joseph Momen
- 2015 – Robert Greer
- 2016 – Governor Earl Ray Tomblin
- 2017 – Coach Mike Carey
- 2018 – Martin Howe
- 2019 – Mike Patrick
- 2022 – Stephen McCoy
- 2023 – Brad D. Smith
- 2024 – Tim Sharpe
- 2025 – Ed Aman
- 2026 – Phil Cunningham

=== Italian-American women of the year ===
- 1984 – Ann DeNardi & Mary Ann Angotti
- 1985 – Lucille Ellis & Florence Lombardi Merow
- 1986 – Ann Christafore Zippili & Judy Prozillo Byers
- 1987 – Dr. Regina Barberia & Nicki Epstein
- 1988 – Princine Nordica Tighe
- 1989 – Denise Giardiana
- 1990 – Rosalie Gaziano
- 1991 – Jean Battlo
- 1992 – Dr. Linda DiGiustino Sabak
- 1993 – Lydia Deboni Main
- 1994 – Sister Anne Francis Bartus
- 1995 – Lois Ellis Wolfe
- 1996 – Tina Romito Mascaro
- 1997 – Edna Antoinette Falbo
- 1998 – Donna Marlene
- 1999 – Dr. Theresa Amato Edwards
- 2000 – Patricia P. O'Reilley
- 2001 – Sister Sandra Peraldo
- 2002 – Marie Prezioso
- 2003 – Rosalyn Queen Alonso
- 2004 – Michelle A. Plutro
- 2005 – Leyna Gabriele
- 2006 – Carolyn Peluso Atkins
- 2007 – Joyce DeWitt
- 2008 – Rose Romona Rodrigues Davis
- 2009 – Dr. Paula Romano Potter
- 2010 – Natalie Tennant
- 2011 – Dr. Renee Saggio Moore
- 2012 – Dr. Clara Spatafore
- 2013 – Sharon Flanery
- 2014 – Angela Bellotte
- 2015 – Dr. Joy Faini Saab
- 2016 – Mayor Catherine Goings
- 2017 – Raffaella "Folly" (Romano) Basile
- 2018 – Jamie Hamrick
- 2019 – Dr. Mary Frances Veltri Jordan
- 2022 – Rachel Romano
- 2023 – Aimme Goddard
- 2024 – Kathy D'Antoni
- 2025 – Sara Aman
- 2026 – JoAnne McNemar

=== Honorary Italian women of the year ===
- 1984 – Sally Giese
- 1985 – Dr. Nell Bailey
- 1986 – Kelly L. George
- 1987 – Barbara Warner
- 1988 – Hazel Ruby McQuain
- 1989 – Justice Margaret Workman
- 1990 – Meredith Sue Willis
- 1991 – Phyllis Curtin
- 1992 – Dr. Ruth Jackson
- 1993 – Judge Janice Warder
- 1994 – Judge Callie Tsapis
- 1995 – Laura Milan
- 1996 – Maria "Zeny" Cunanan
- 1997 – Betty Puskar
- 1998 – Jeanny Kalaycioglu
- 1999 – Hovah Hall Underwood
- 2000 – Joan Ohl
- 2001 – Shelly Moore Capito
- 2002 – Sister Mary Rebecca Fiddler
- 2003 – Merle Moore
- 2004 – Judge Irene Keeley
- 2005 – Helen Jones
- 2006 – Dr. Pamela Sumpter-Cain
- 2007 – Mary Lou Jones
- 2008 – Kathryn Titus
- 2009 – First Lady Gayle Manchin
- 2010 – Dr. Carroll Kelly Morrison
- 2011 – Lisa Furbee Ford
- 2012 – Jane White Gabor
- 2013 – Margaret Bailey
- 2014 – Sarah Carr Parsons
- 2015 – Dr. Doreen M. Larson, Ph.D
- 2016 – Nicole Folio
- 2017 – Lotus Averil MacDowell
- 2018 – Sandra Patterson
- 2019 – Gretchen Palek
- 2022 – Pamela Hotsinpiller
- 2023 – Cheryl Romano
- 2024 – JoDonna Burdoff
- 2025 – Shirlene Isabella
- 2026 – Rosemarie C. Igbo

== See also ==
- Italian Americans
- Pepperoni roll
