= James Childers =

Suspected American serial killer

- Born: James E. Childers; February 8, 1964; Copen, West Virginia, U.S.
- Died: June 2, 2009 (aged 45); Clarksburg, West Virginia, U.S.
- Cause of death: Suicide by gunshot
- Conviction: N/A
- Penalty: N/A

Details
- Victims: 2–5+
- Span of crimes: 2000s–2009
- Country: United States
- State: West Virginia
- Date apprehended: Died before apprehension

James E. Childers (February 8, 1964 – June 2, 2009) was a confessed American serial killer and arsonist. On June 1, 2009, he sent a package of letters and a two-hour long recording to the police station in Clarksburg, West Virginia, which contained his confessions to at least five murders and four arsons. After examining his testimony, authorities located the bodies of two women at the places indicated by Childers, and soon after, they moved in to arrest him. Upon learning this, Childers committed suicide by shooting himself in the head.

== Biography ==
Little is known about Childers' childhood. He was born on February 8, 1964, and he grew up on a 96-acre farm his family owned in Copen. After leaving school, Childers moved to Clarksburg, where in the following years he took up many jobs, mainly in the construction industry and later as a handyman. In the late 1990s, he began to show signs of depression, and began to abuse both alcohol and drugs, for which he had to undergo treatment. Despite this, he was considered a law-abiding citizen, with his friends and acquaintances describing him as a friendly man who would help neighbors with chores, and was often strolling around the city.

== Exposure ==
On June 1, 2009, a packet containing letters and an audio-taped confession was delivered to the Clarksburg police station, most of which consisted of incoherent ramblings, but also had Childers admitting to five murders and four arsons that had occurred in the last few years. He did not express remorse for what he had done, and said that his misanthropic views were the motive for the killings, admitting an excessive resentment, paranoia, distrust and anger directed towards everybody around him, including relatives. In the tape, Childers claimed that he had buried four of the victims on the family farm in Braxton County, and another one was discarded in Barbour County. He additionally named other potential victims whom he had planned to kill for one reason or another, and told that he had tried to pay off an acquaintance to provide information about the whereabouts of his ex-girlfriend. A few hours after listening to the tapes, officers were dispatched to the locations and to their horror, they found two skeletal female corpses. The body found in Barbour County was identified as 26-year-old Carrie Lynn Baker, who had gone missing in Clarksburg in the summer of 2008. According to the autopsy report, she had died from blunt force trauma to the head. The second body, found at the Childers family farm in Copen, was identified as 45-year-old Carolyn Sue Sauerwein, a friend of Childers since 2001. She had been shot in the head. Shortly after these discoveries, police issued an arrest warrant for Childers, who was last seen at the Towne House Motel in Clarksburg. The following day, numerous officers had surrounded the motel, but upon learning this, Childers took out a gun and shot himself in the head. After confirming his death, investigators, together with dog handlers, combed through the farm, where, according to James' testimony, there were at least three other people buried, but no further remains were found. However, Clarksburg police consider Childers the prime suspect in the murder of Ralph Hill, a friend of his who was killed in 2004. According to the FBI, Childers' modus operandi classifies him as a serial killer. The investigation into his crimes is currently at a standstill, as the police were unable to link any missing persons or homicide victims back to Childers, who was known to contact women through newspaper ads and used four different vehicles for transportation, most notably a 1986 red Dodge with a white top.

In 2017, Lost Valley Studios filmed a documentary titled Mountain of the Missing, centered around the events in Clarksburg, in an attempt to find evidence about Childers' involvement in disappearances and murders of people in Clarksburg, Harrison County and other areas of West Virginia over the years. During filming, they interviewed friends, neighbors, classmates, as well as law enforcement officers, who shared various pieces of information about Childers' private life and crimes. The filmmakers, as part of their own investigation, tried to gain access to the Childers family farm in order to locate the burial sites of the other alleged victims using metal detectors, but Childer's relatives did not permit them, with the Clarksburg police also refusing to issue a search warrant for the property.

== See also ==
- List of serial killers in the United States
