= Waldomore =

Historic house in West Virginia, United States

- U.S. National Register of Historic Places
- U.S. Historic district – Contributing property
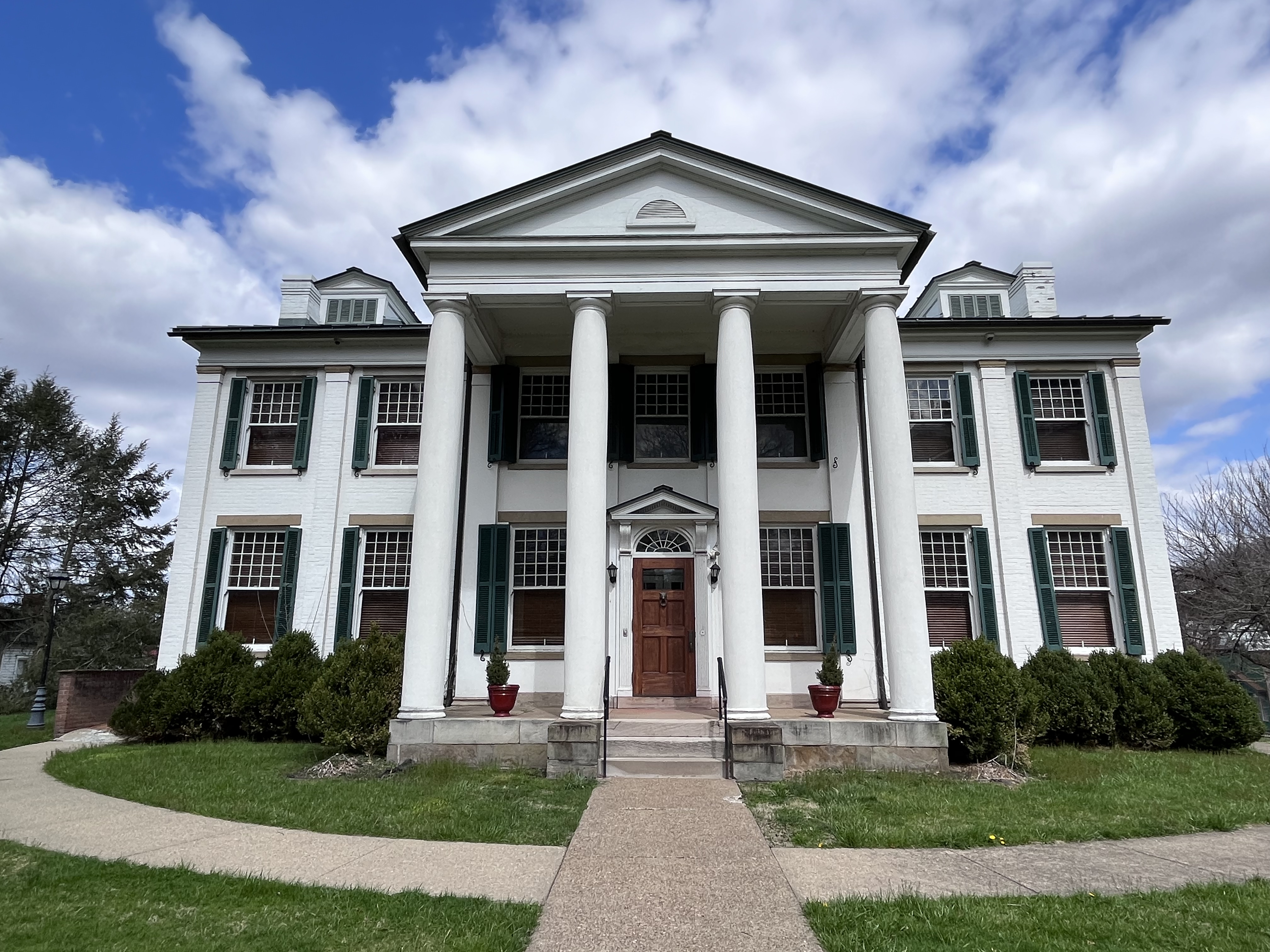

- Location within West Virginia
- Location: 400 West Pike St, Clarksburg, West Virginia
- Coordinates: 39°16′53″N 80°20′24″W
- Built: 1839
- Architectural style: Classical Revival, Greek Revival
- Part of: Clarksburg Downtown Historic District (ID82004794)
- NRHP reference No.: 78002797

Significant dates
- Added to NRHP: October 4, 1978
- Designated CP: April 12, 1982

Waldomore, also known as The Waldomore, is a two-story Neo-Classical brick mansion located in the Clarksburg Downtown Historic District of Clarksburg, West Virginia, United States. The building was listed on the National Register of Historic Places on October 4, 1978. The building is currently operated by the Clarksburg public library that is located in a larger building next door. Waldomore is now the repository for materials relating to the state's culture and history as well as the books and papers of notorious UFO writer Gray Barker. It also has a collection of resources for genealogical research.

== History ==
The Waldomore was constructed in late 1839 for Waldo P. Goff, a prominent lawyer and politician on part of a 4-acre (16,000 m^{2}) tract that extended from Pike Street to Elk Creek. The structure's name was coined by combining the names of the original owners Waldo Goff and his wife Harriet L. Moore. The Waldomore was added to The National Register of Historic Places in 1978. This classical revival structure was the home of Waldo Goff and his family.

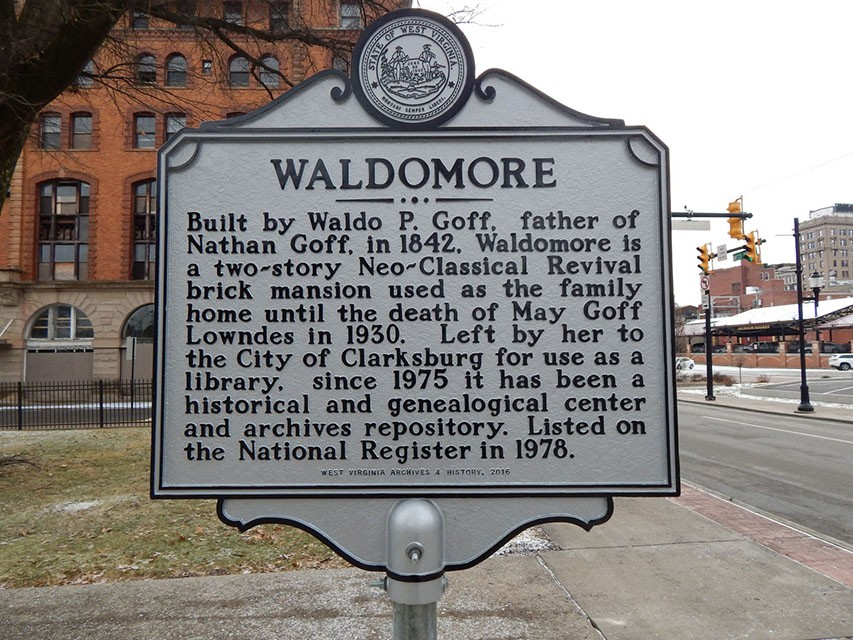
Historical marker

The Waldomore was donated to the City of Clarksburg by May Goff Lowndes (Mrs. Richard T. Lowndes) in 1930 on the condition that it was to be used as a public library or museum and for no other purpose. It served as the Clarksburg Public Library from 1931 to 1976 when the new library was constructed next door on the same property.

=== Goff Family ===
The home was constructed in 1839 for Waldo P. Goff. Goff was born in 1796, the fifth son of Job and Zerviah Goff who moved to Harrison County in 1804 from New York. Of the eight children born to this family, four sons eventually served in the Virginia State Legislators of Virginia and West Virginia. Waldo Goff was a member of the Virginia State Senate from 1833 to 1837, and thereafter held numerous local minor offices including that of sheriff of Harrison County in 1851. The most famous of Waldo Goff's children was Nathan Goff Jr. born at the Waldomore February 9, 1843. Nathan served as Secretary of the Navy appointed by president Rutherford B. Hayes. In 1876, Nathan Goff ran for governor and was defeated by Henry Mathews. Nathan Goff was a United States Congressman from 1883 to 1889.

== Impact on the City of Clarksburg ==
Nathan Goff Jr. also constructed a grand 7 story state of the art hotel right across the street from his family home called the Waldo Hotel in 1904.

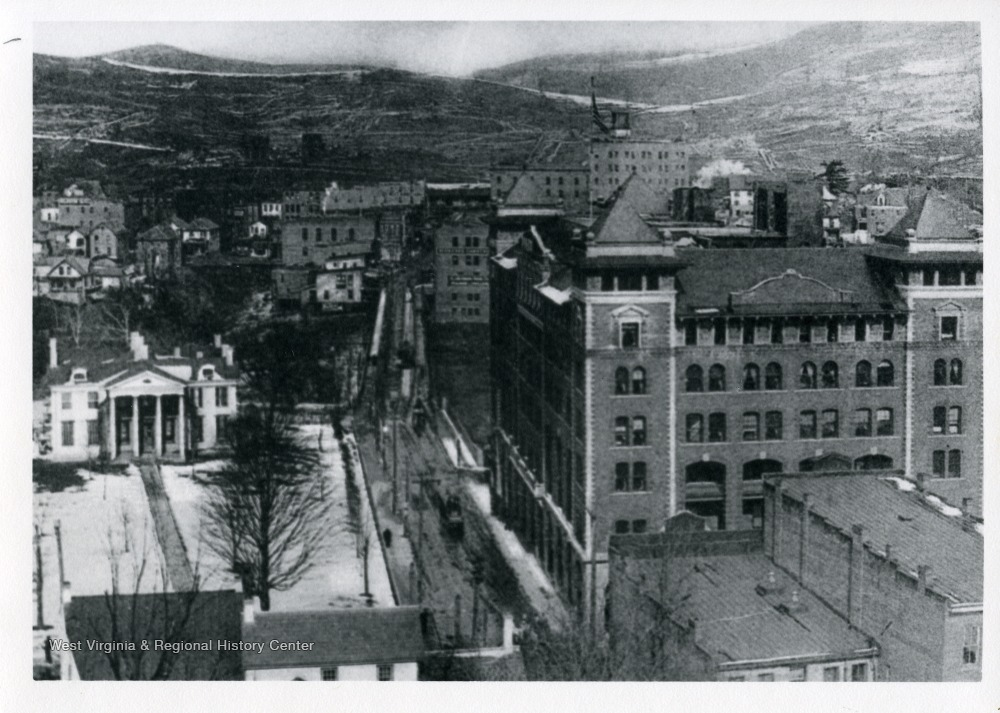
The Waldomore and The Waldo Hotel

== See also ==
- National Register of Historic Places listings in West Virginia
