= Clarksburg History Museum =

Coordinates: 39°16′46″N 80°20′31″W

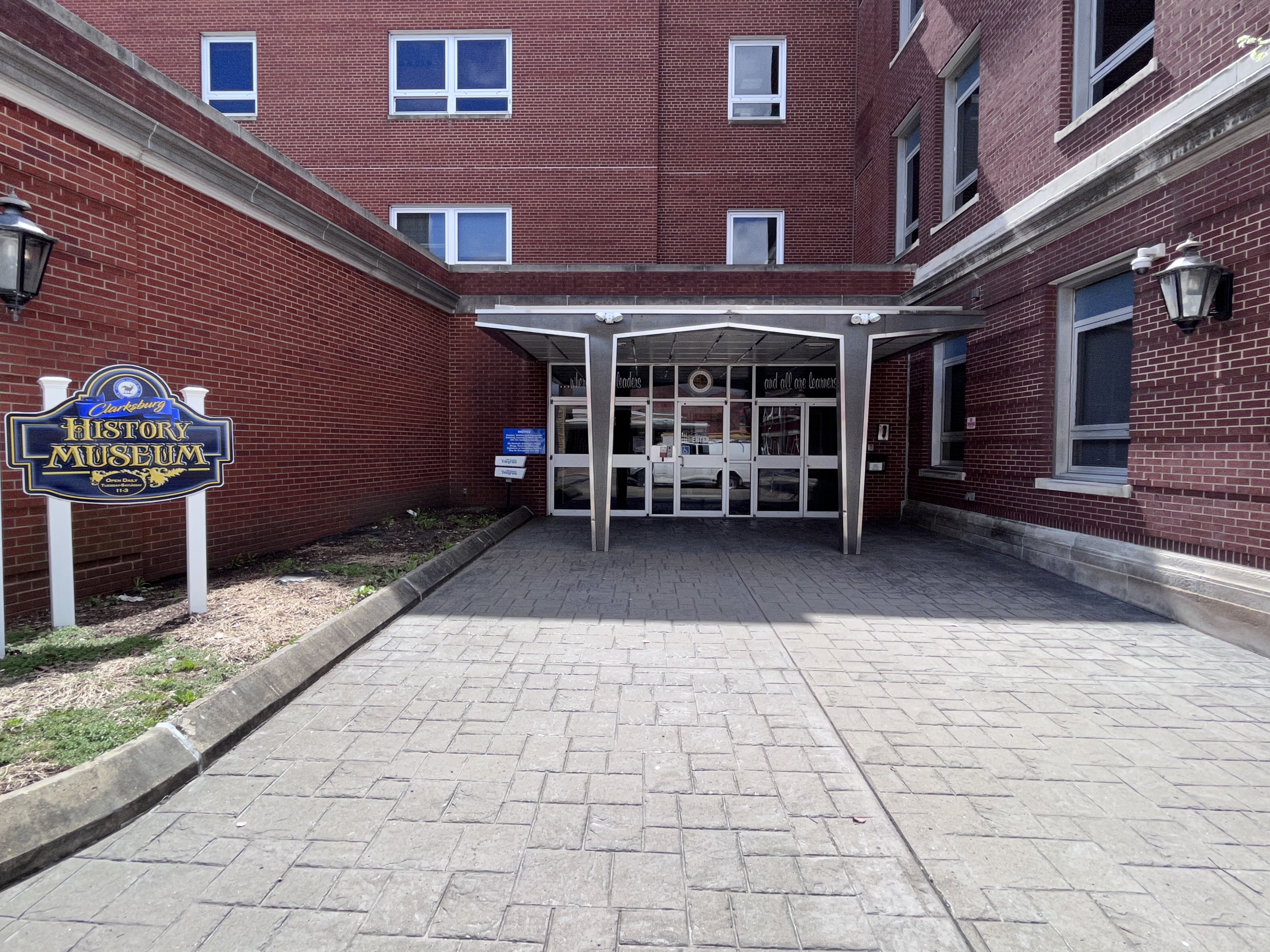
- Clarksburg History Museum in 2023
- Established: 2017; 9 years ago
- Location: 445 W Main St, Clarksburg, West Virginia 26301
- Type: History Museum
- Website: Official Website

Clarksburg History Museum is a history museum located in Clarksburg, West Virginia. The goal of the museum is to "teach, inspire, and strengthen connections to history for everyone in Clarksburg, Harrison County, West Virginia, and beyond".

In 2025, the Clarksburg History Museum faced financial hardship during the Department of Government Efficiency cuts.

== See also ==
- List of museums in West Virginia
