= Clarksburg, West Virginia =

- City
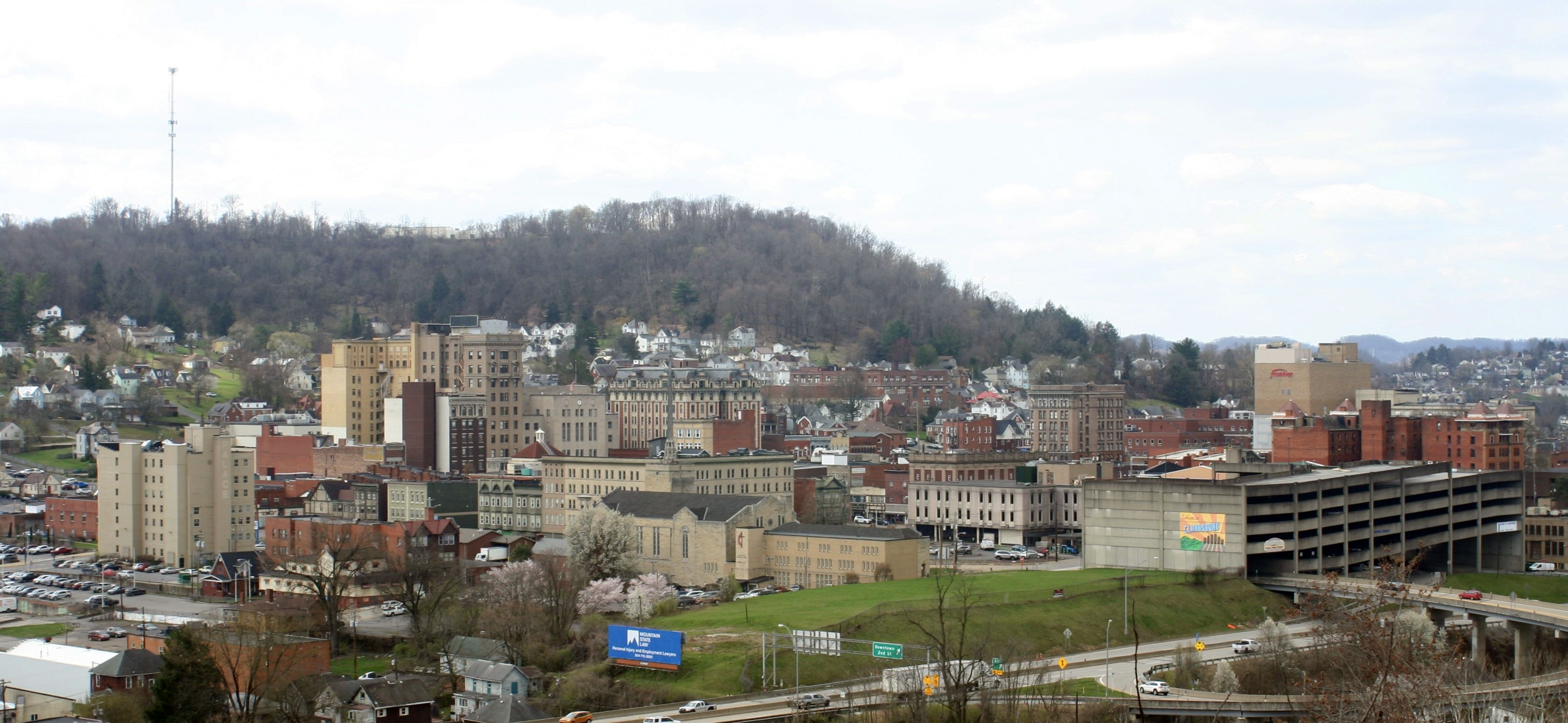
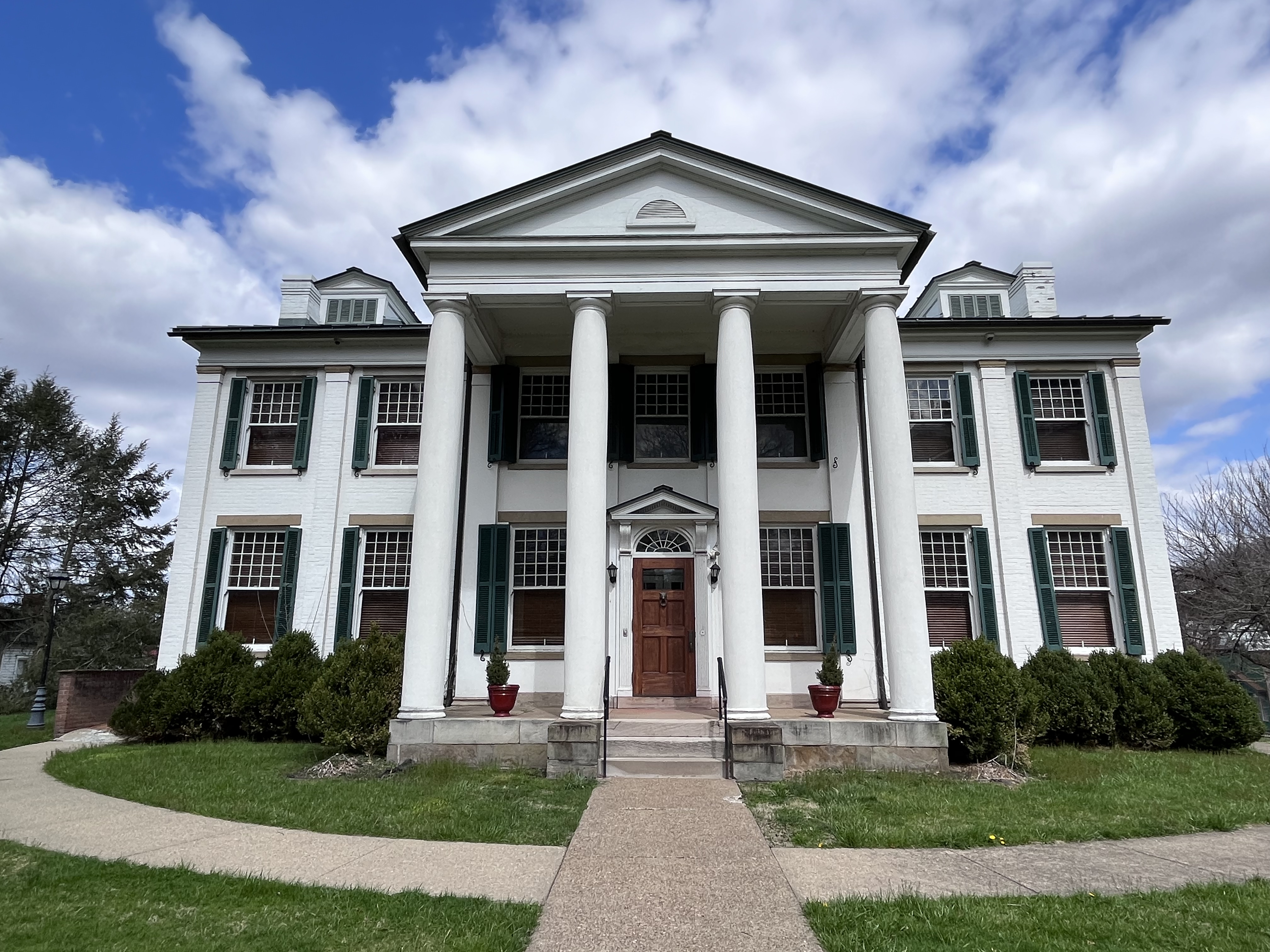
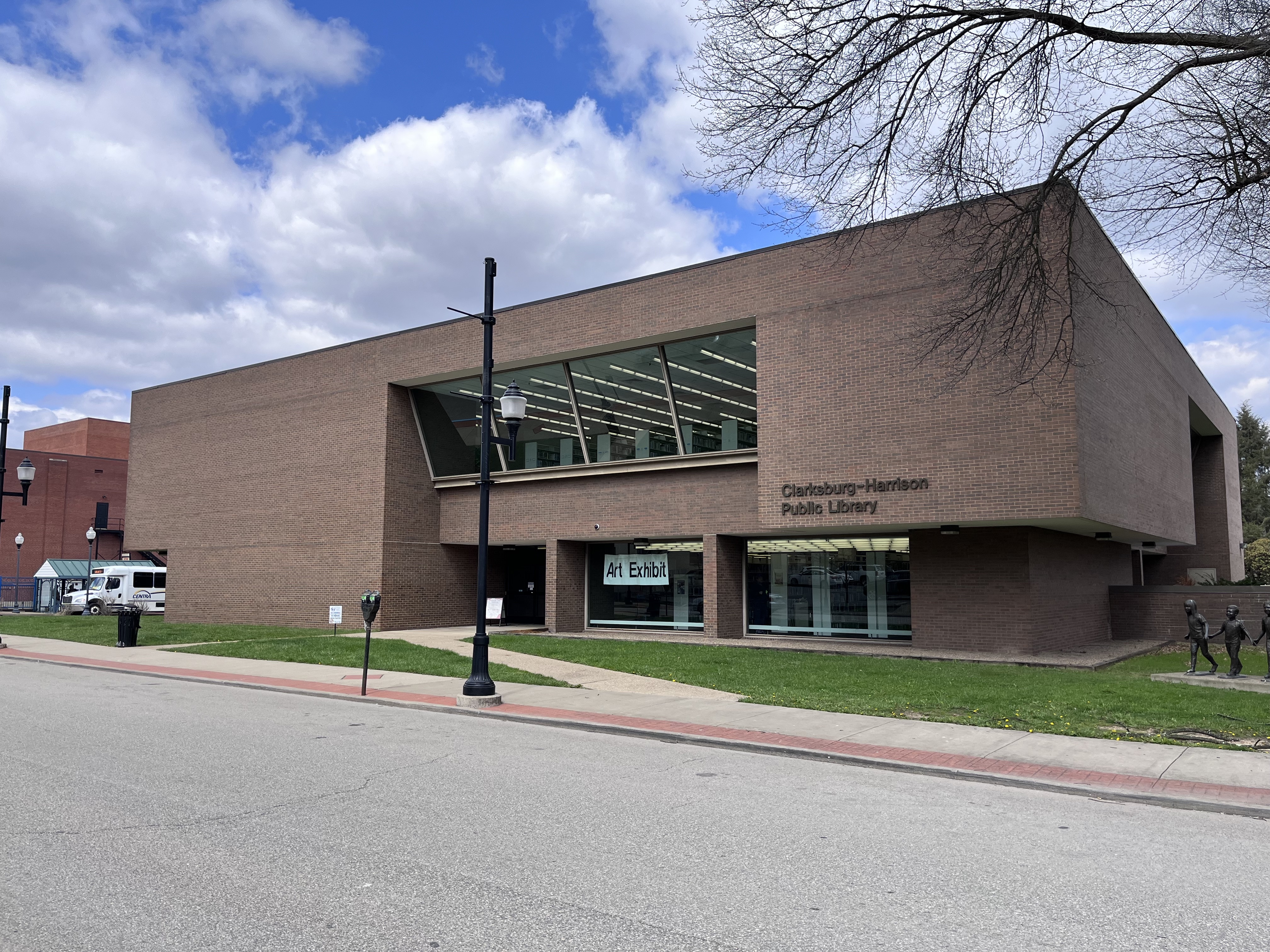
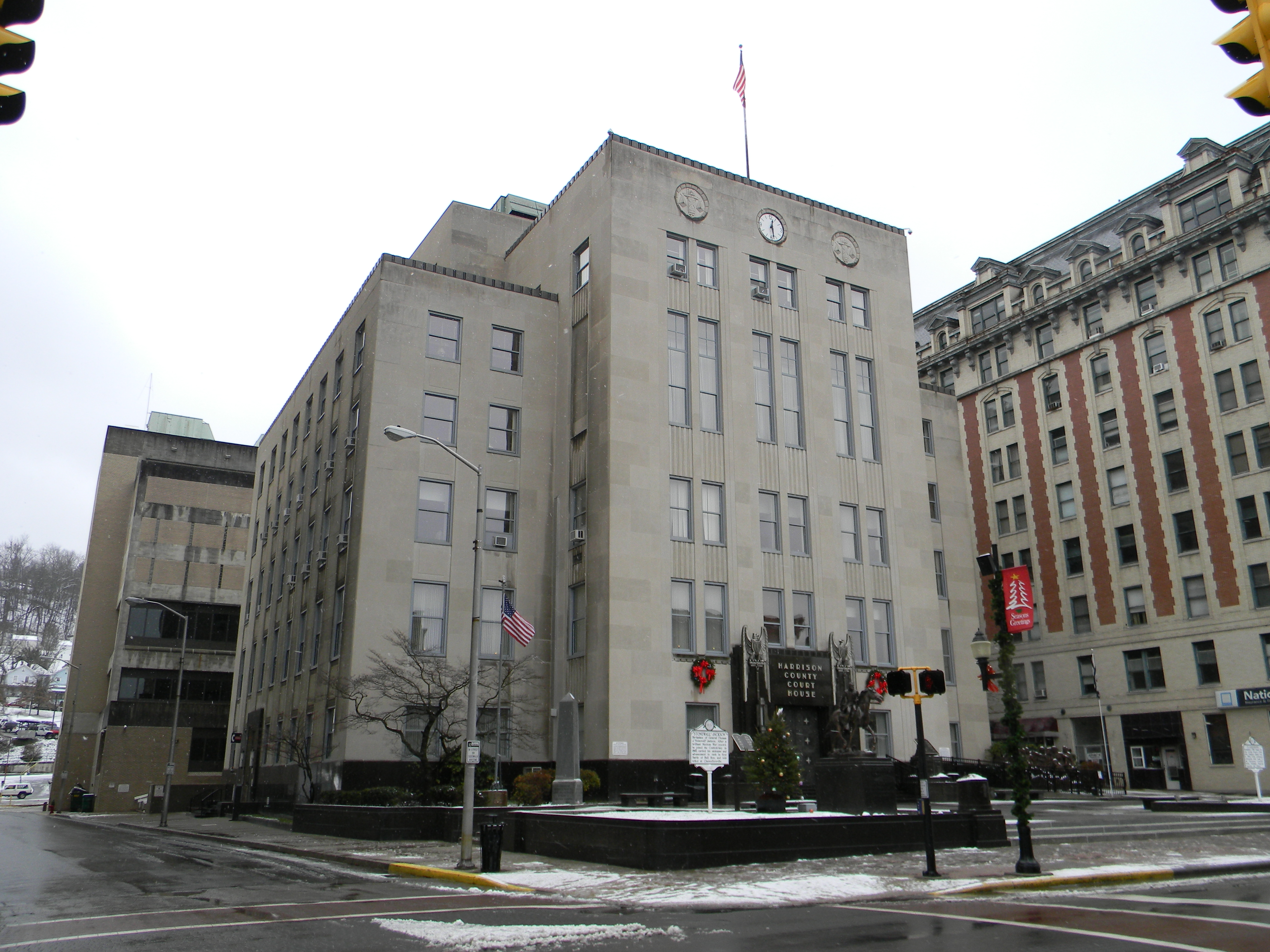
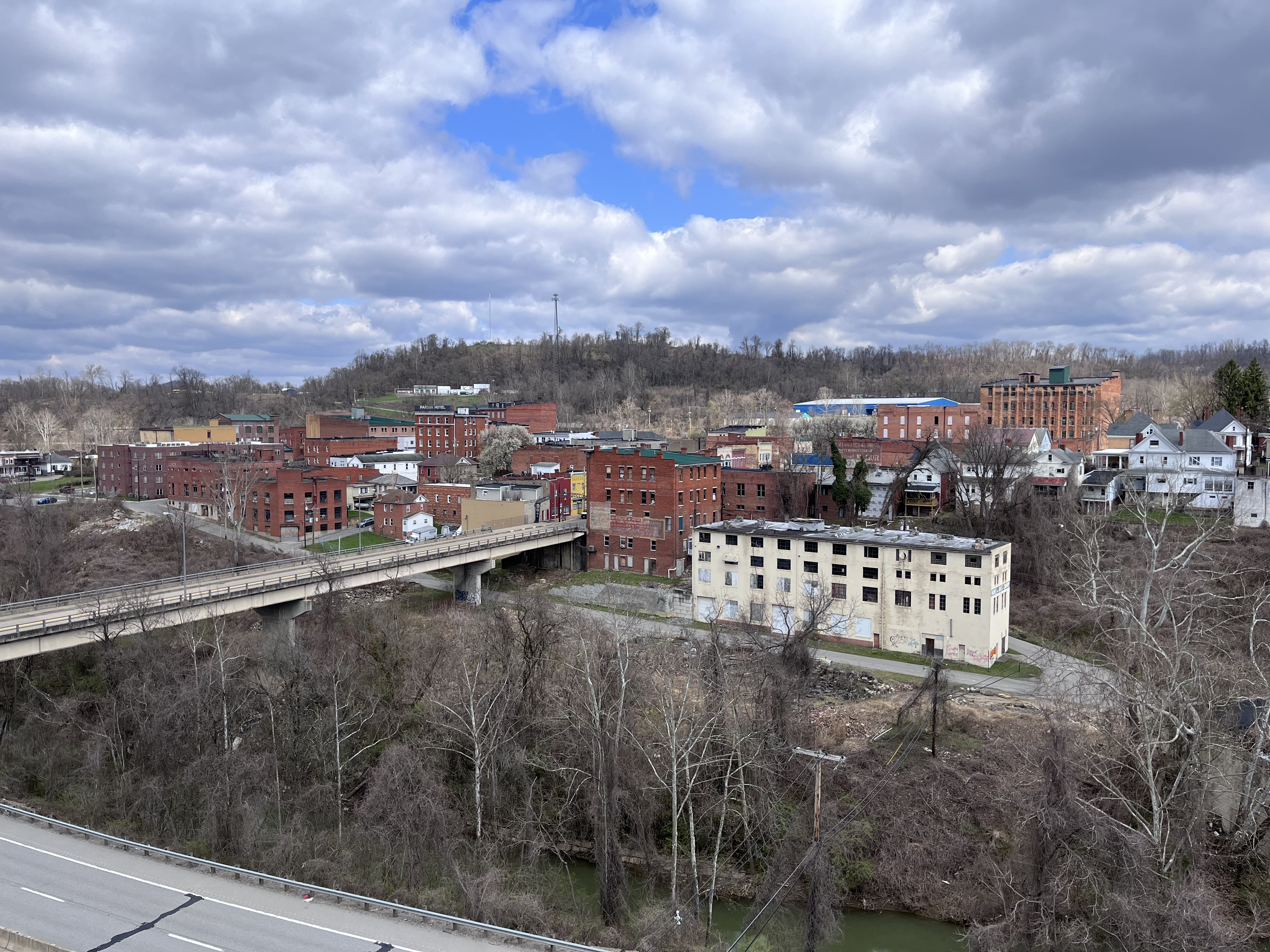
- Downtown Clarksburg Waldomore Clarksburg-Harrison Public Library Harrison County Courthouse Glen Elk Historic District

- Flag Seal
- Nickname: Jewel of the Hills
- Motto: "Proud Past...Unlimited Future"
- Interactive map of Clarksburg, West Virginia
- Location within West Virginia Location within the United States
- Coordinates: 39°16′50″N 80°20′40″W
- Country: United States
- State: West Virginia
- County: Harrison
- Chartered: 1785

Government
  - Type: Council–manager
  - Mayor: Wayne Worth
  - City manager: Tiffany Fell

Area
  - Total: 9.715 sq mi (25.161 km^{2})
  - Land: 9.713 sq mi (25.157 km^{2})
  - Water: 0.0015 sq mi (0.004 km^{2})
- Elevation: 994 ft (303 m)

Population (2020)
  - Total: 16,061
  - Estimate (2025): 15,562
  - Density: 1,654/sq mi (638.5/km^{2})
  - Micropolitan area: 90,434
- Time zone: UTC-5 (Eastern (EST))
  - Summer (DST): UTC-4 (EDT)
- ZIP Codes: 26301, 26302, 26306
- Area codes: 304 and 681
- FIPS code: 54-15628
- GNIS feature ID: 1537358
- Website: https://www.clarksburgwv.gov/

Clarksburg is a city in Harrison County, West Virginia, United States, and its county seat. The population was 16,061 at the 2020 census, making it the tenth-most populous city in West Virginia. It is the principal city of the Clarksburg micropolitan area in North Central West Virginia, which had a population of 90,434 in 2020.

== History ==
=== Early settlement and development ===
Two prehistoric burial mounds known as the Oak Mounds are located south of Clarksburg. In 1764, trapper John Simpson became the first European known to claim land in the area. European settlement began in the early 1770s, and about 1773 Daniel Davisson acquired 400 acres (160 ha) where Clarksburg now stands.

When Harrison County was created in 1784, Clarksburg became the county seat. The town was named for Revolutionary War officer George Rogers Clark and was chartered by the Virginia General Assembly in 1785. Construction of the first Harrison County courthouse began in 1787. That year, the Virginia General Assembly also established Randolph Academy in Clarksburg, the first such educational institution west of the Allegheny Mountains.

In 1819, Virginia was divided into two federal judicial districts, with the Western District of Virginia headquartered in Clarksburg. Clarksburg also hosted an 1841 convention that called for free public schools in Virginia. Poor transportation limited the town's early growth until the Northwestern Turnpike reached Clarksburg in the 1830s. The Baltimore and Ohio Railroad reached the city in the mid-1850s, providing improved access to regional and national markets.

=== Civil War and statehood ===
Following the Virginia secession convention's April 1861 vote to submit an ordinance of secession to voters, Unionists led by John S. Carlile held a convention in Clarksburg on April 22, 1861. The meeting called for representatives from northwestern Virginia counties to assemble in Wheeling the following month. The resulting First Wheeling Convention became part of the political process that led to the creation of West Virginia.

During the American Civil War, Clarksburg's location on the Baltimore and Ohio Railroad made it an important Union supply base, and Federal troops occupied the city. Confederate forces operated in the surrounding region, including during the Jones–Imboden Raid of 1863, but did not capture Clarksburg.

=== Industrial growth ===
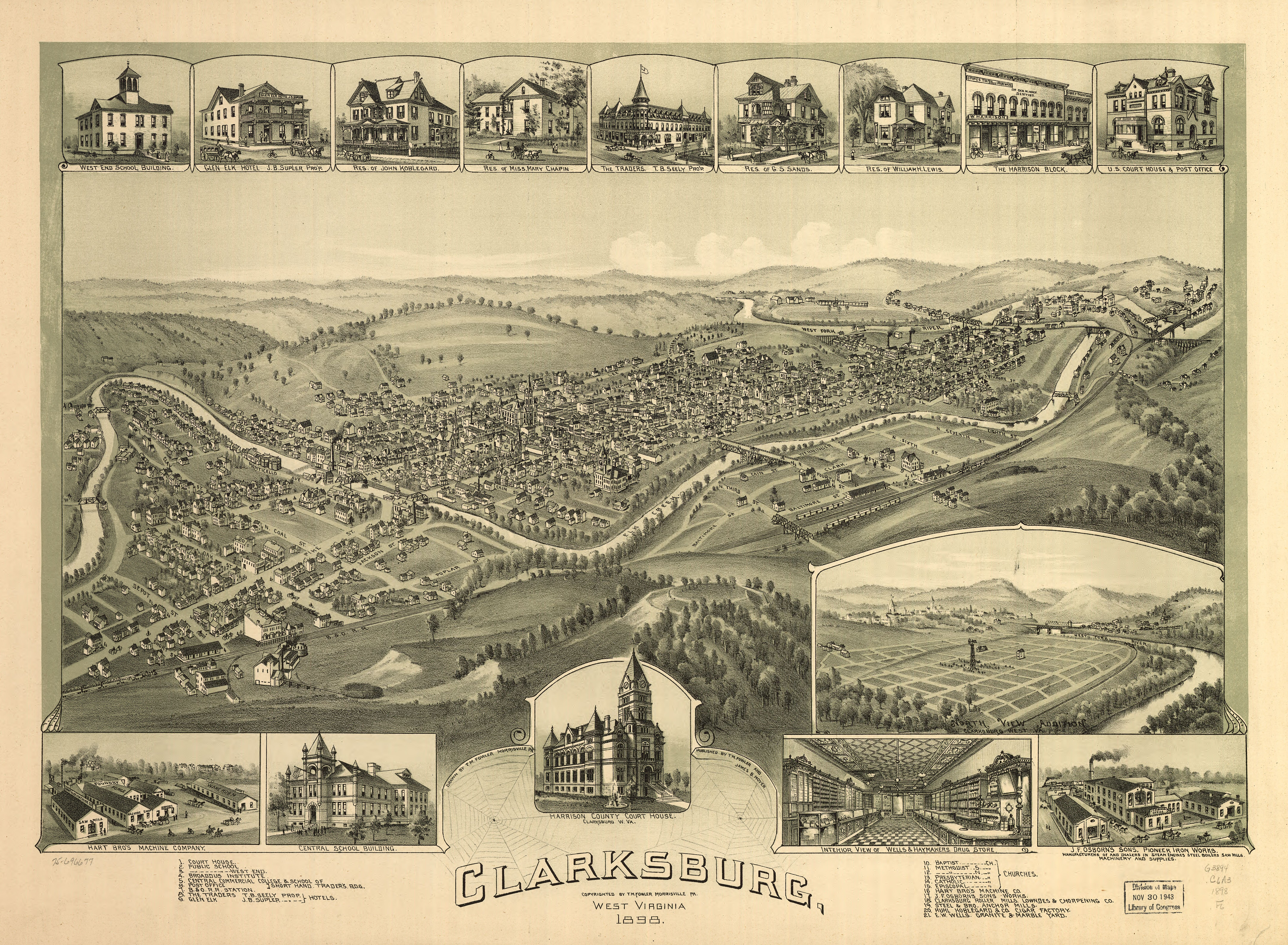
1898 bird's-eye view of Clarksburg

Clarksburg grew as a commercial and industrial center after the Civil War as railroad access and nearby supplies of coal, oil, and natural gas attracted manufacturing. In 1877, Clarksburg was one of three cities on the ballot in a statewide referendum to choose a permanent state capital, along with Charleston and Martinsburg. Charleston won the referendum and became the permanent capital in 1885.

The city's population increased from 4,050 in 1900 to 27,869 in 1920. Part of this growth resulted from the 1917 annexation of Adamston, Stealey, North View and Broad Oaks, which had previously been separate municipalities. Industrial growth brought immigrants from Ireland, Italy, Greece, France, Belgium and Spain. Black migrants from the South also arrived during the Great Migration.

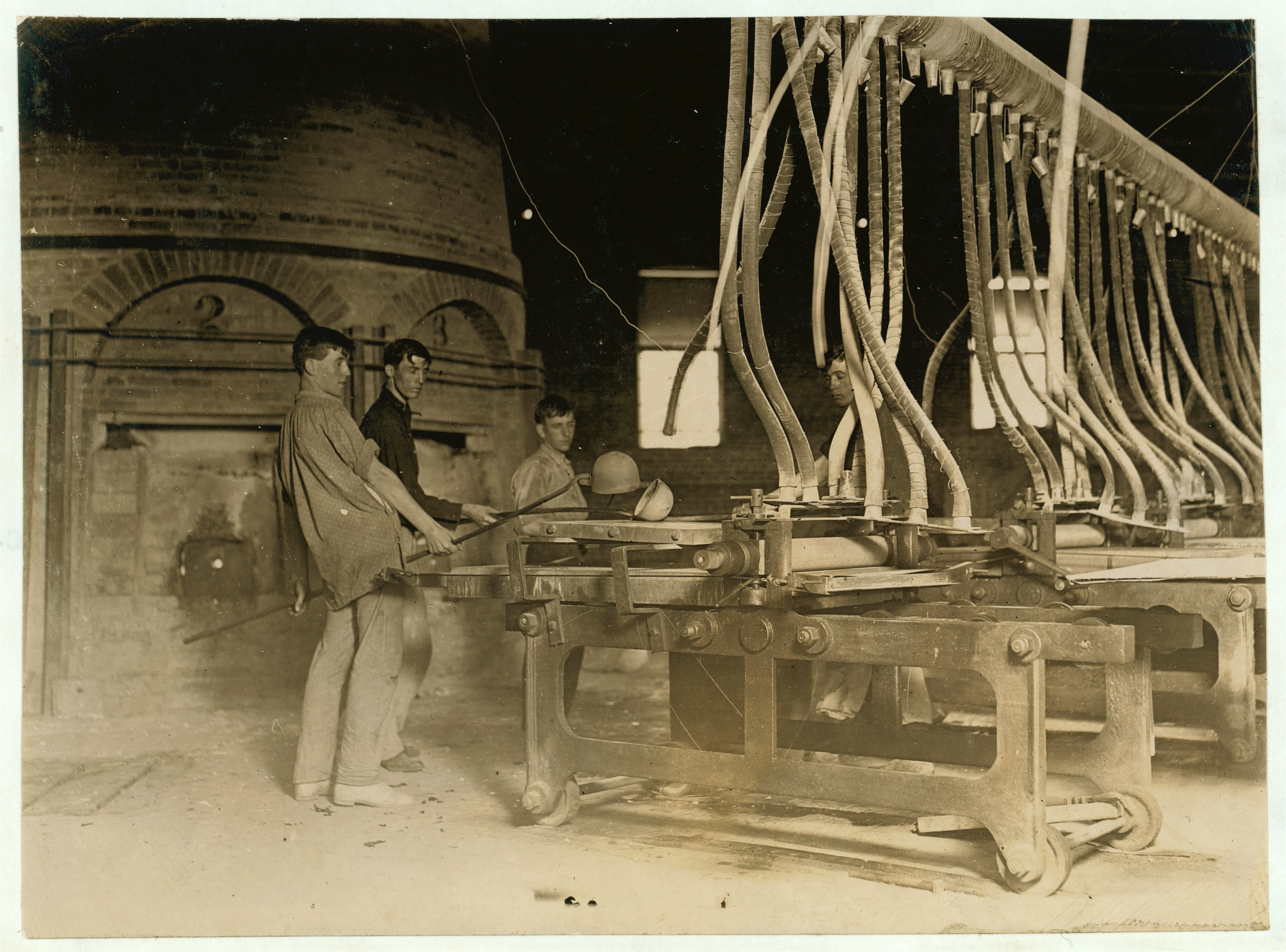
Child labor at the Crescent Glass Works, 1908

Glassmaking became an important local industry. The Hazel-Atlas Glass Company operated a Clarksburg plant from 1902 to 1987 that became the world's largest tumbler factory and employed about 1,200 people by 1920. The Akro Agate Company relocated from Akron, Ohio, to Clarksburg in 1914 and became a major producer of glass marbles and pressed glass before ceasing production in 1951.

Kelly Miller High School opened in 1903 as a segregated regional school for African American students. It served students from Harrison County and several neighboring counties and became a center of Clarksburg's Black community. The school closed in 1956 following the desegregation of public schools after Brown v. Board of Education.

=== Mid-20th century and modern development ===
The Great Depression brought business failures, industrial decline and population loss. During World War II, Clarksburg again served as an important railroad center. Construction of Interstate 79 and the four-lane U.S. Route 50 corridor in the 1970s improved highway access, while industrial plant closures in the 1980s weakened the city's manufacturing base.

In January 1991, the Federal Bureau of Investigation purchased a 986 acres (399 ha) site in Clarksburg for the headquarters of its Criminal Justice Information Services Division. Construction began in October 1991, the division was established in February 1992, and the complex was completed in July 1995.

=== Notable criminal cases ===
In November 1805, Abel Clemmons murdered his wife and eight children at the family's home about half a mile from Clarksburg, which was then part of Virginia. His wife was pregnant at the time. Clemmons was later convicted and executed in 1806.

During the early 20th century, the Black Hand operated in northern West Virginia, using threats and extortion against members of Italian immigrant communities. On February 11, 1923, eight members of the Black Hand were arrested in Harrison County. Their prosecution in Clarksburg followed a three-year period of murders described as alleged gangland vendettas and became one of the city's best-known criminal trials.

In 1931, Harry Powers, who operated a grocery store in Clarksburg's Broad Oaks neighborhood, was charged with killing two women and three children whose bodies were found at his property in Quiet Dell, near Clarksburg. Public interest in the case was large enough that his trial was held at the Moore Opera House in Clarksburg. Powers was convicted of the murder of Dorothy Lemke and was executed in 1932.

In October 1996, seven members of the Mountaineer Militia were arrested in connection with a plot to bomb the Federal Bureau of Investigation's Criminal Justice Information Services Division facility in Clarksburg. Militia leader Floyd Raymond Looker was arrested after receiving $50,000 for blueprints of the facility from an undercover FBI agent posing as a representative of a terrorist organization.

In 2009, Clarksburg resident James Childers sent police written and recorded statements in which he admitted killing two women and claimed responsibility for at least three additional murders and four arsons. Information in the statements led authorities to the bodies of Carrie Lynn Baker and Carolyn Sauerwein. Childers died by suicide as police moved to arrest him. FBI behavioral specialists later classified him as a serial murderer and identified him as the prime suspect in a 2004 death that Clarksburg police reopened.

In July 2020, Reta Mays, a former nursing assistant at the Louis A. Johnson VA Medical Center in Clarksburg, pleaded guilty to seven counts of second-degree murder and one count of assault with intent to commit murder in the deaths of veterans at the hospital. In May 2021, she was sentenced to seven consecutive life sentences plus 20 years.

== Geography ==
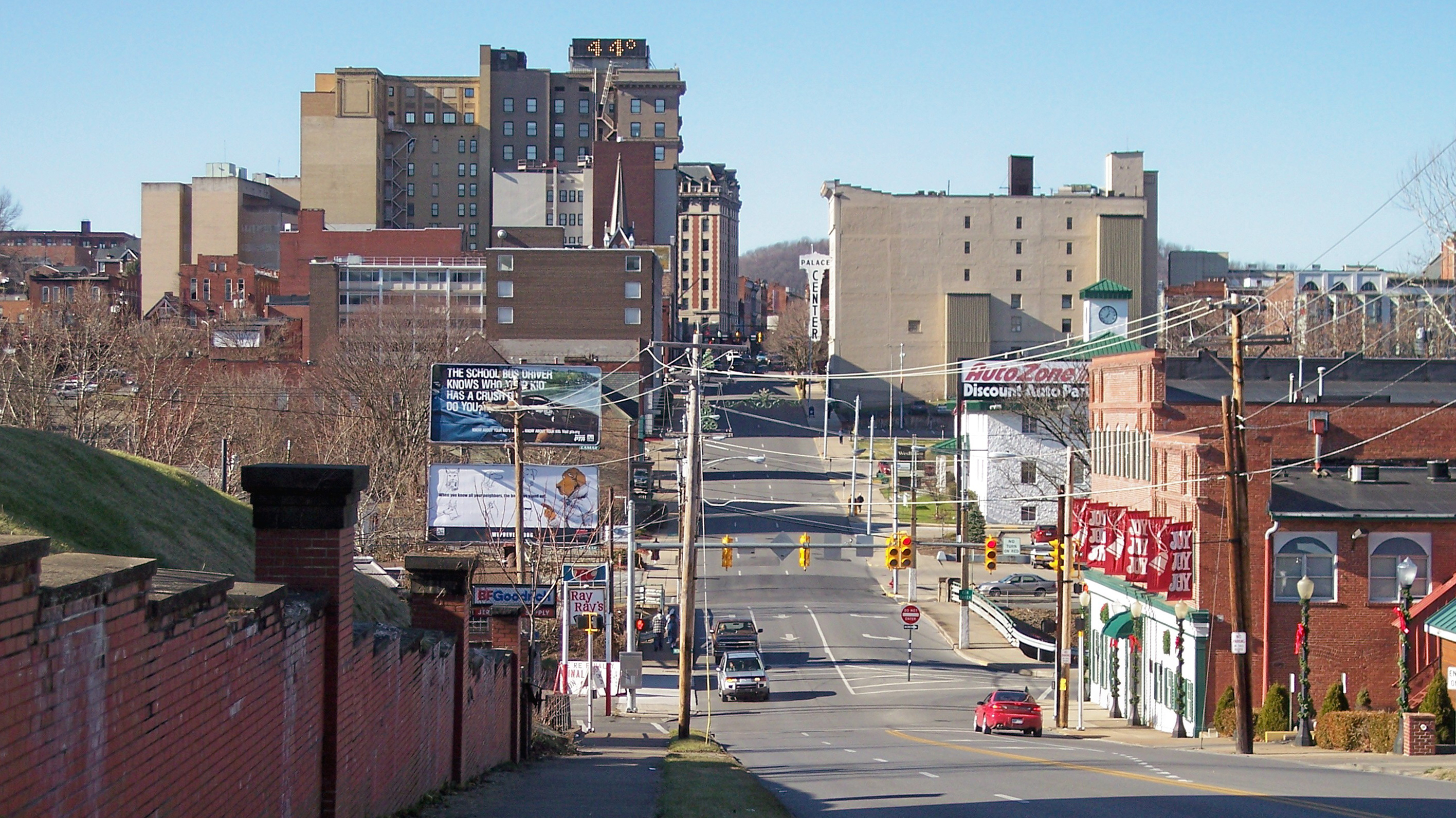
Downtown Clarksburg as viewed from the east on Main Street

Clarksburg is located at 39°16′50″N 80°20′40″W, along the West Fork River and Elk Creek.

According to the United States Census Bureau, the city has a total area of 9.715 square miles (25.16 km^{2}), of which 9.713 square miles (25.16 km^{2}) is land and 0.002 square miles (0.01 km^{2}) is water.

Clarksburg is located in North Central West Virginia. It lies within the Western Allegheny Plateau ecoregion.

Clarksburg is located at the junction of U.S. Route 50 and U.S. Route 19, two miles west of the junction of U.S. Route 50 with Interstate 79. The city lies at an elevation of 1,007 feet (307 m) at the confluence of Elk Creek and the West Fork River.

=== Climate ===
NOAA's 1991–2020 climate normals for the Clarksburg 1 station near the city center show an annual mean temperature of 52.8 °F (11.6 °C), average annual precipitation of 48.24 in (1,225 mm), and average annual snowfall of 23.8 in (60 cm).

Record temperatures range from −24 °F (−31 °C) on January 19, 1994, to 102 °F (39 °C), most recently recorded on September 3 and 4, 1953.

Climate data for Clarksburg Benedum Airport, West Virginia (1991–2020 normals, extremes 1922–present) (Note: Records maintained at Benedum Airport since August 8, 1998, and at the "Clarksburg 1" COOP (39°16′06″N 80°21′08″W) before then.)
Month	Jan	Feb	Mar	Apr	May	Jun	Jul	Aug	Sep	Oct	Nov	Dec	Year
Record high °F (°C)	78 (26)	79 (26)	88 (31)	95 (35)	96 (36)	100 (38)	102 (39)	101 (38)	102 (39)	95 (35)	85 (29)	78 (26)	102 (39)
Mean maximum °F (°C)	65.2 (18.4)	66.8 (19.3)	76.1 (24.5)	84.0 (28.9)	87.8 (31.0)	90.6 (32.6)	91.8 (33.2)	90.9 (32.7)	88.9 (31.6)	82.0 (27.8)	74.7 (23.7)	67.0 (19.4)	92.7 (33.7)
Mean daily maximum °F (°C)	42.6 (5.9)	45.6 (7.6)	54.7 (12.6)	67.6 (19.8)	75.7 (24.3)	82.5 (28.1)	85.5 (29.7)	84.6 (29.2)	78.9 (26.1)	67.6 (19.8)	56.0 (13.3)	46.6 (8.1)	65.7 (18.7)
Daily mean °F (°C)	33.6 (0.9)	36.1 (2.3)	44.1 (6.7)	55.3 (12.9)	63.9 (17.7)	71.3 (21.8)	74.8 (23.8)	73.6 (23.1)	67.2 (19.6)	55.8 (13.2)	45.7 (7.6)	37.8 (3.2)	54.9 (12.7)
Mean daily minimum °F (°C)	24.6 (−4.1)	26.6 (−3.0)	33.4 (0.8)	43.1 (6.2)	52.0 (11.1)	60.2 (15.7)	64.2 (17.9)	62.7 (17.1)	55.4 (13.0)	44.1 (6.7)	35.5 (1.9)	29.0 (−1.7)	44.2 (6.8)
Mean minimum °F (°C)	1.3 (−17.1)	6.2 (−14.3)	13.4 (−10.3)	25.8 (−3.4)	34.8 (1.6)	45.6 (7.6)	52.7 (11.5)	51.0 (10.6)	40.8 (4.9)	28.5 (−1.9)	18.9 (−7.3)	10.5 (−11.9)	−1.6 (−18.7)
Record low °F (°C)	−24 (−31)	−23 (−31)	−18 (−28)	7 (−14)	23 (−5)	33 (1)	41 (5)	39 (4)	29 (−2)	14 (−10)	−2 (−19)	−13 (−25)	−24 (−31)
Average precipitation inches (mm)	3.30 (84)	3.14 (80)	3.62 (92)	3.89 (99)	4.25 (108)	4.54 (115)	5.40 (137)	3.62 (92)	3.51 (89)	3.02 (77)	3.17 (81)	3.38 (86)	44.84 (1,139)
Average precipitation days (≥ 0.01 in)	15.1	13.5	14.1	14.6	15.8	14.2	14.9	13.9	13.3	13.6	11.1	14.3	168.4
Source: NOAA

Climate data for Clarksburg 1 (near city center), West Virginia (1991–2020 normals, extremes 1922–present)
Month	Jan	Feb	Mar	Apr	May	Jun	Jul	Aug	Sep	Oct	Nov	Dec	Year
Record high °F (°C)	78 (26)	79 (26)	88 (31)	95 (35)	96 (36)	100 (38)	102 (39)	101 (38)	102 (39)	94 (34)	85 (29)	78 (26)	102 (39)
Mean maximum °F (°C)	65.2 (18.4)	66.8 (19.3)	76.1 (24.5)	84.0 (28.9)	87.8 (31.0)	90.6 (32.6)	91.8 (33.2)	90.9 (32.7)	88.9 (31.6)	82.0 (27.8)	74.7 (23.7)	67.0 (19.4)	92.7 (33.7)
Mean daily maximum °F (°C)	39.7 (4.3)	43.2 (6.2)	52.2 (11.2)	65.4 (18.6)	74.7 (23.7)	82.1 (27.8)	85.1 (29.5)	83.6 (28.7)	77.4 (25.2)	65.6 (18.7)	53.4 (11.9)	44.0 (6.7)	63.9 (17.7)
Daily mean °F (°C)	30.7 (−0.7)	33.3 (0.7)	41.0 (5.0)	52.3 (11.3)	62.2 (16.8)	70.3 (21.3)	74.0 (23.3)	72.6 (22.6)	65.9 (18.8)	53.9 (12.2)	42.6 (5.9)	35.3 (1.8)	52.8 (11.6)
Mean daily minimum °F (°C)	21.7 (−5.7)	23.4 (−4.8)	29.7 (−1.3)	39.1 (3.9)	49.6 (9.8)	58.5 (14.7)	63.0 (17.2)	61.7 (16.5)	54.5 (12.5)	42.1 (5.6)	31.9 (−0.1)	26.6 (−3.0)	41.8 (5.4)
Mean minimum °F (°C)	1.3 (−17.1)	6.2 (−14.3)	13.4 (−10.3)	25.8 (−3.4)	34.8 (1.6)	45.6 (7.6)	52.7 (11.5)	51.0 (10.6)	40.8 (4.9)	28.5 (−1.9)	18.9 (−7.3)	10.5 (−11.9)	−1.6 (−18.7)
Record low °F (°C)	−24 (−31)	−23 (−31)	−18 (−28)	7 (−14)	23 (−5)	33 (1)	41 (5)	39 (4)	29 (−2)	14 (−10)	−2 (−19)	−13 (−25)	−24 (−31)
Average precipitation inches (mm)	3.54 (90)	3.39 (86)	4.17 (106)	4.08 (104)	4.78 (121)	4.85 (123)	5.33 (135)	3.96 (101)	3.67 (93)	3.34 (85)	3.32 (84)	3.81 (97)	48.24 (1,225)
Average snowfall inches (cm)	7.9 (20)	7.8 (20)	3.5 (8.9)	0.1 (0.25)	0.0 (0.0)	0.0 (0.0)	0.0 (0.0)	0.0 (0.0)	0.0 (0.0)	0.0 (0.0)	0.7 (1.8)	3.8 (9.7)	23.8 (60)
Average precipitation days (≥ 0.01 in)	15.6	13.9	14.2	14.2	15.0	12.7	12.4	10.9	10.1	11.6	12.3	15.3	158.2
Average snowy days (≥ 0.1 in)	4.9	4.2	1.6	0.1	0.0	0.0	0.0	0.0	0.0	0.0	0.7	3.1	14.6
Source: NOAA

== Demographics ==
Historical population
Census	Pop.	Note	%±
1860	895		—
1880	2,307		—
1890	3,008		30.4%
1900	4,050		34.6%
1910	9,201		127.2%
1920	27,869		202.9%
1930	28,866		3.6%
1940	30,579		5.9%
1950	32,014		4.7%
1960	28,112		−12.2%
1970	24,864		−11.6%
1980	22,371		−10.0%
1990	18,059		−19.3%
2000	16,743		−7.3%
2010	16,578		−1.0%
2020	16,061		−3.1%
2025 (est.)	15,562		−3.1%
U.S. Decennial Census

=== 2020 census ===
At the 2020 census, Clarksburg had a population of 16,061. The United States Census Bureau estimated the city's population at 15,562 as of July 1, 2025.

For 2020–2024, the Census Bureau reported 6,753 households in Clarksburg, with an average of 2.28 persons per household. Median household income was $47,386, and per capita income was $27,699.

=== Immigration and ethnic communities ===
Clarksburg's industrial growth in the 19th and early 20th centuries brought successive waves of immigrants to the city, including Irish, Italians, Greeks, French, Belgians, and Spanish.

Belgian immigrants from the Charleroi area became closely associated with the window-glass industry. During the early 20th century, French was frequently spoken in the North View neighborhood, where French-speaking residents often were Walloons, or French-speaking Belgians. Adamston, now part of Clarksburg, was among the Belgian enclaves that elected Socialist mayors before World War I.

Clarksburg remains one of the centers of Italian-American population in West Virginia. The Glen Elk neighborhood was designated "Clarksburg's Little Italy" by the city in 2019. The West Virginia Italian Heritage Festival was first held in downtown Clarksburg in 1979 and is held each Labor Day weekend to celebrate the state's Italian-American culture.

== Education ==
Public education in Clarksburg is provided by Harrison County Schools, whose central office is located in the city. The city's public secondary schools include Robert C. Byrd High School and Liberty Middle School.

Liberty Middle School opened for the 2025–26 school year following the consolidation of Washington Irving Middle School and Mountaineer Middle School. The consolidated school occupies the former Liberty High School facility.

Notre Dame Middle and High School is a Catholic secondary school located on East Pike Street.

Pierpont Community & Technical College operates its Clarksburg campus on West Main Street. The campus includes the Gaston Caperton Center and the Veterinary Technology Building. In 2022, Pierpont announced a nearly $2 million investment to renovate the former Clarksburg Eye Center for its veterinary technology program. The facility was designed to include classrooms and hands-on training areas and to be modeled on a modern veterinary hospital.

== Government ==
Clarksburg operates under a council-manager form of government. The city council serves as the legislative body, while the city manager handles the day-to-day operations of the city and carries out policies adopted by the council.

The mayor presides over meetings of the city council and serves as the head of city government for ceremonial and military purposes, but has no regular administrative duties.

== Public safety ==
Law enforcement services are provided by the Clarksburg Police Department.

Fire protection is provided by the Clarksburg Fire Department, which operates from four fire stations in the city. The city maintains a Class 2 rating from the Insurance Services Office.

== Health care ==
The Louis A. Johnson VA Medical Center is located in Clarksburg and is the main campus of the VA Clarksburg Healthcare System. The system provides health care through the Clarksburg medical center and outpatient facilities serving northern and central West Virginia.

United Hospital Center was formed in 1970 through the merger of St. Mary's Hospital and Union Protestant Hospital. A new United Hospital Center opened in Bridgeport in 2010. The former United Hospital Center in Clarksburg was converted into Highland-Clarksburg Hospital, a nonprofit behavioral health hospital that began admitting patients in August 2013.

== Economy ==
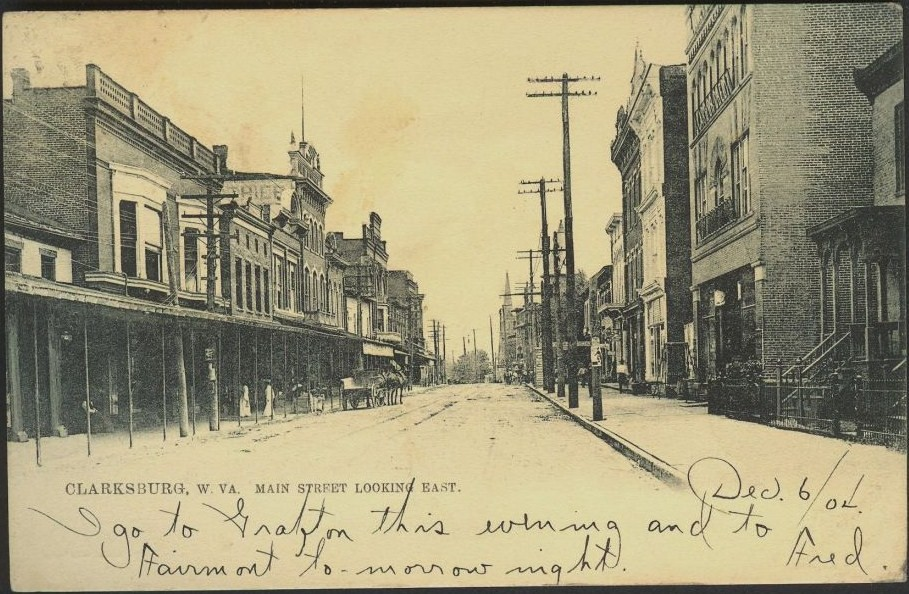
Postcard of Main Street in Clarksburg, looking east (1904)

The availability of natural resources and access to railroad facilities attracted industry and manufacturing to Clarksburg. Industries included chemical plants, brickworks, potteries, foundries and machine shops, hardwood and casket companies, glass factories, and the Jackson, later Phillips, Sheet and Tin Plate Company, a forerunner of Weirton Steel. Economic development brought successive waves of immigrants in the 19th and early 20th centuries, including Irish, Italians, Greeks, French, Belgians, and Spanish.

By the early 20th century, Clarksburg had eight banks, three hospitals, and several hotels, including the seven-story Waldo Hotel, which opened in 1909. The seven-story Empire Bank Building was completed in 1907, the nine-story Goff Building in 1911, and the 10-story Union Bank Building in 1912.

By 1929, Clarksburg's population had reached 35,115. During the Great Depression, the city lost industry and population, while during World War II the railroad again made Clarksburg a central clearinghouse. New development followed construction of Interstate 79 and the four-lane U.S. Route 50 corridor in the 1970s, while industrial plant closings in the 1980s negatively affected the local economy. Expansion in the government and technology sectors began in the 1990s, including the relocation of the FBI Criminal Justice Information Services Division to Clarksburg.

The United States Census Bureau reported $721.5 million in retail sales in Clarksburg in 2022 and $290.8 million in health care and social assistance receipts and revenue.

=== Glass industry ===
Glass factories were among the manufacturing industries that developed in Clarksburg as natural resources and railroad access attracted industry to the city.

The Akro Agate Company was organized in Akron, Ohio, in 1911 and relocated to Clarksburg in 1914 because of the availability of glass sand and inexpensive natural gas. It became a major manufacturer of glass marbles, producing more than two million per week during the popularity of Chinese checkers in the 1930s and 1940s. Beginning in the 1930s, Akro Agate also produced pressed-glass vases, floral ware, containers, and miniature children's dishes. The company ceased production in 1951.

The Hazel-Atlas Glass Company was formed in 1902 through the merger of four earlier companies and was the largest glass company in the United States from the 1930s through the 1950s. Its Clarksburg plant, which operated from 1902 to 1987, was the world's largest tumbler factory. By 1920, the plant contained 15 acres (6.1 ha) of floor space, employed 1,200 people, and shipped products throughout the world. Hazel-Atlas was a major producer of inexpensive colored tableware known as Depression glass.

Rolland Glass and Fourco Glass were also part of Clarksburg's glass industry. Records held by the West Virginia University Libraries identify the Rolland family as the founders of the Rolland Glass Company and as among the founders of the Fourco Glass Company. The Fourco records include material concerning changes in production techniques and improvements in flat glassmaking. The United States Environmental Protection Agency reports that glass was manufactured at the North 25th Street site in Clarksburg from 1899 through 1989.

=== Federal Bureau of Investigation ===
In January 1991, the Federal Bureau of Investigation purchased 986 acres (399 ha) in Clarksburg for construction of a complex for its Criminal Justice Information Services Division, or CJIS. Construction began in October 1991 and was completed in July 1995. The division was established in February 1992 from the former Identification Division. Programs initially consolidated under CJIS included the National Crime Information Center, Uniform Crime Reporting, and fingerprint identification.

The $200 million complex was built in Clarksburg through the efforts of U.S. Senator Robert Byrd, who worked to obtain funding for the project. The FBI describes CJIS as the focal point and central repository for its criminal justice information services and identifies it as the bureau's largest division.

== Culture ==
=== Festivals, events and cultural institutions ===
The West Virginia Italian Heritage Festival has been held in downtown Clarksburg since 1979 during Labor Day weekend. The festival celebrates the Italian-American heritage of West Virginia and Clarksburg, which remains one of the state's centers of Italian-American population.

The West Virginia Black Heritage Festival developed from an Emancipation Proclamation celebration organized by the Kelly Miller Alumni Association. The first official event was held in Clarksburg on September 22, 1990. The festival includes music and community events and awards scholarships to local youth.

The Cecil Jarvis Greater Clarksburg 10K was first held in 1997 following a year of planning. The race was renamed in 2007 following the death of Cecil Jarvis, who had supported the race as a sponsor and participant.

The MTN Craft Film Festival began at the Robinson Grand Performing Arts Center in 2023. The festival returned for a second year in 2024 and features short films, documentaries, animated films, and feature-length films with an Appalachian focus.

Clarksburg also hosts Jesus Fest, an annual Christian music and community event held at Jackson Square.

The Robinson Grand Performing Arts Center opened as the Robinson Grand Theater in 1913. After closing in 2004, the building was acquired by the city in 2014 and underwent a rehabilitation completed in 2018. It now operates as a performing arts venue.

The Clarksburg-Harrison Public Library occupies a building completed in 1975 and designed by Marcel Breuer and Hamilton Smith. The adjoining Waldomore, which served as the city's public library from 1931 until the new building opened, now houses the library's local history, genealogy, special collections, and archives and is used for cultural and educational programs.

The Clarksburg History Museum opened in 2018 and maintains exhibits relating to the history of Clarksburg and Harrison County.

=== Landmarks and attractions ===
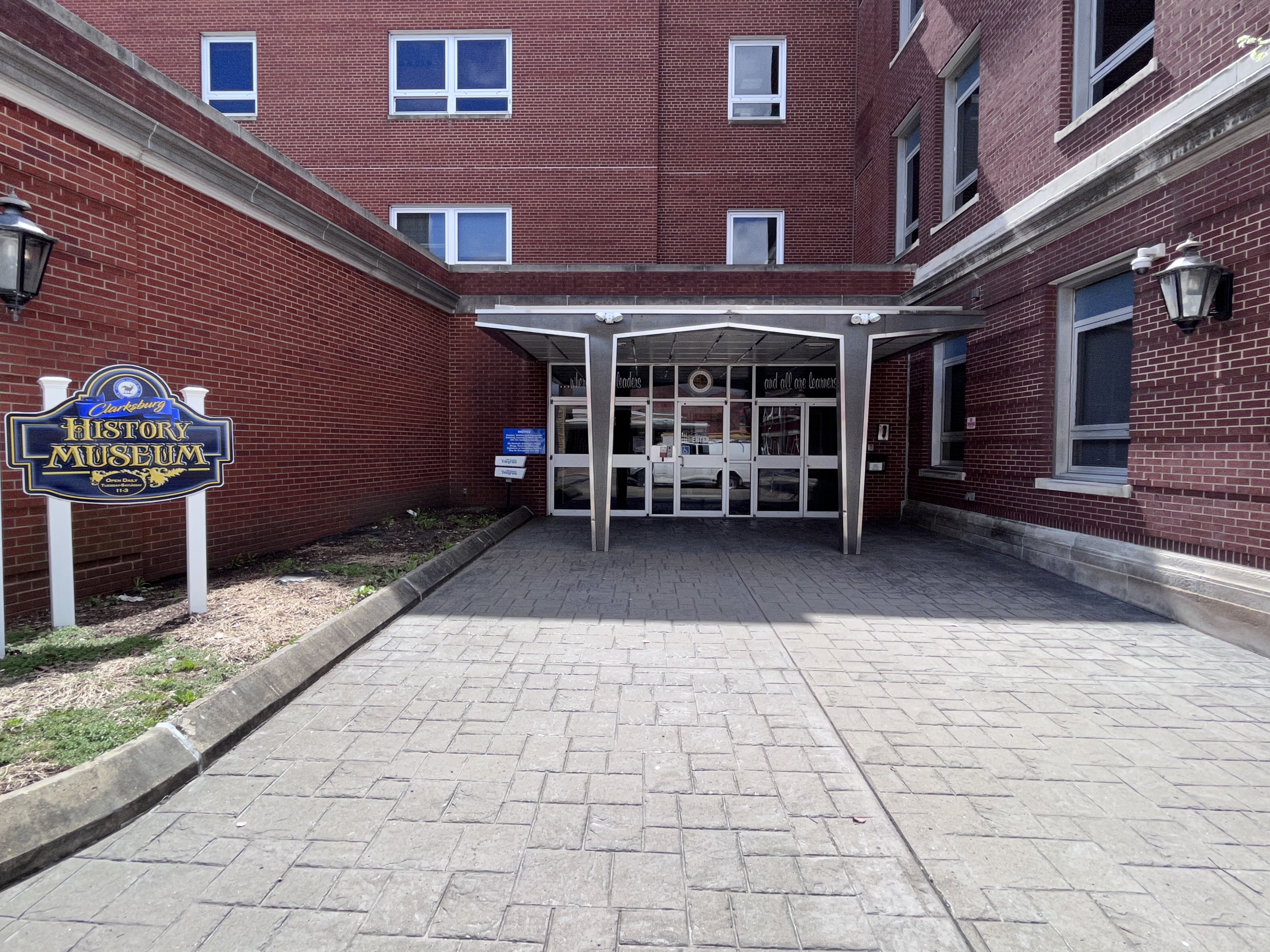
Clarksburg History Museum, a museum focused on the history of Clarksburg and Harrison County

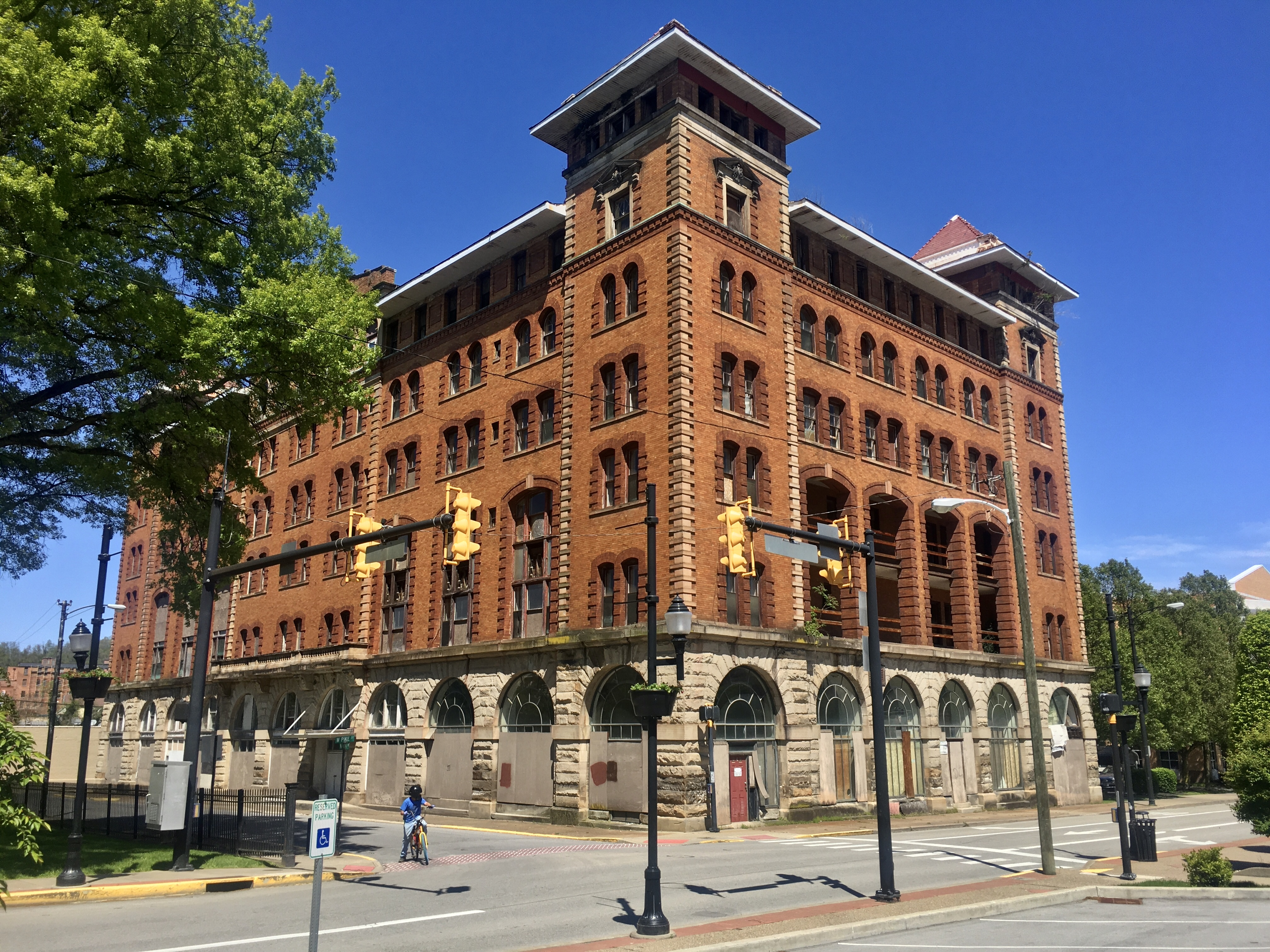
The Waldo Hotel

- Clarksburg Amphitheater
- Clarksburg City Park (Norwood Park) Located within the limits of Nutter Fort, West Virginia but owned and operated by the City of Clarksburg.
- Clarksburg Downtown Historic District
- Clarksburg History Museum
- Clarksburg-Harrison Public Library
- Clarksburg Splash Zone
- Edgewood Manor
- Glen Elk Historic District
- Harrison County Courthouse
- Jackson Cemetery
- Kelly Miller High School
- Lowndes Hill Park and Civil War earthworks
- Merchants National Bank Building
- Oak Mounds
- Quality Hill Historic District
- Robinson Grand Performing Arts Center
- Stealey-Goff-Vance House
- Stonewall Jackson birthplace site
- Veterans Memorial Park
- Victory High School
- Waldo Hotel
- Waldomore
- Washington Irving High School

=== Sports ===
Professional minor league baseball was played in Clarksburg at various times during the early 20th century. Clarksburg teams competed in the Class D Western Pennsylvania League, Pennsylvania-West Virginia League, and West Virginia League. Teams used several names, including the Clarksburg Bees, Clarksburg Drummers, Clarksburg Cyrians or Ghosts, and Clarksburg Generals. Future major leaguer Dick Hoblitzell played professionally in Clarksburg before joining the Cincinnati Reds.

From 1926 through 1932, the Clarksburg Generals competed in the Class C Middle Atlantic League. In 1930, the Generals finished the regular season with a 64–53 record and lost a playoff series to the Johnstown Johnnies, four games to three.

Semi-professional baseball continued in the Clarksburg area after the city's minor league era. Local teams included the Muntzing Jeeps, Moorehouse Kelvinators, and Swaney Coal. Swaney Coal won four Central West Virginia championships between 1952 and 1956, and its players included future Pro Football Hall of Fame member Sam Huff and major leaguers Paul Popovich and Jim Fridley.

The Clarksburg Oilers were a professional basketball team whose players included Homer Shadle. The Oilers participated in the World Professional Basketball Tournament in 1939 and 1940. They lost to the Oshkosh All-Stars 40–33 in the first round in 1939 and to the Waterloo Wonders 41–32 in the first round in 1940.

During the 1970s, the Clarksburg-Bridgeport Red Raiders competed as a semi-professional football team in the Clarksburg-Bridgeport area.

== Media ==
The Exponent Telegram is a newspaper based in Clarksburg. Its predecessors included the Telegram, founded in 1861, and the Exponent, founded in 1910; the publications came under common ownership in 1927.

WBOY-TV (channel 12) is licensed to Clarksburg and maintains its studios on West Pike Street. The station is affiliated with NBC and ABC.

WPDX-FM (104.9 FM) is also licensed to Clarksburg.

== Transportation ==
Clarksburg is at the crossroads of U.S. Route 50 (Corridor D), the main arterial route for Clarksburg, and Interstate 79. Other major highways include West Virginia Route 20, West Virginia Route 58, U.S. Route 19, and West Virginia Route 98.

The Northwestern Turnpike, now known as U.S. Route 50, chartered in 1827, and began in 1831, reached Clarksburg in 1836 and was macadamized from the Tygarts Valley River to Parkersburg in 1848.

The Baltimore and Ohio Railroad reached Clarksburg from Grafton in 1856.

- Interstate 79
- U.S. Route 50
- U.S. Route 19
- West Virginia Route 20
- West Virginia Route 58
- West Virginia Route 98
- West Virginia Route 279

Clarksburg is served by the North Central West Virginia Airport, approximately 7 miles east of the city. Public transportation is provided by the Central West Virginia Transportation Authority (CENTRA), which operates fixed-route bus service in Clarksburg and surrounding communities. CENTRA also provides ADA complementary paratransit service for eligible passengers.
