= Stealey–Goff–Vance House =

Historic house in West Virginia, United States

- U.S. National Register of Historic Places
- U.S. Historic district – Contributing property
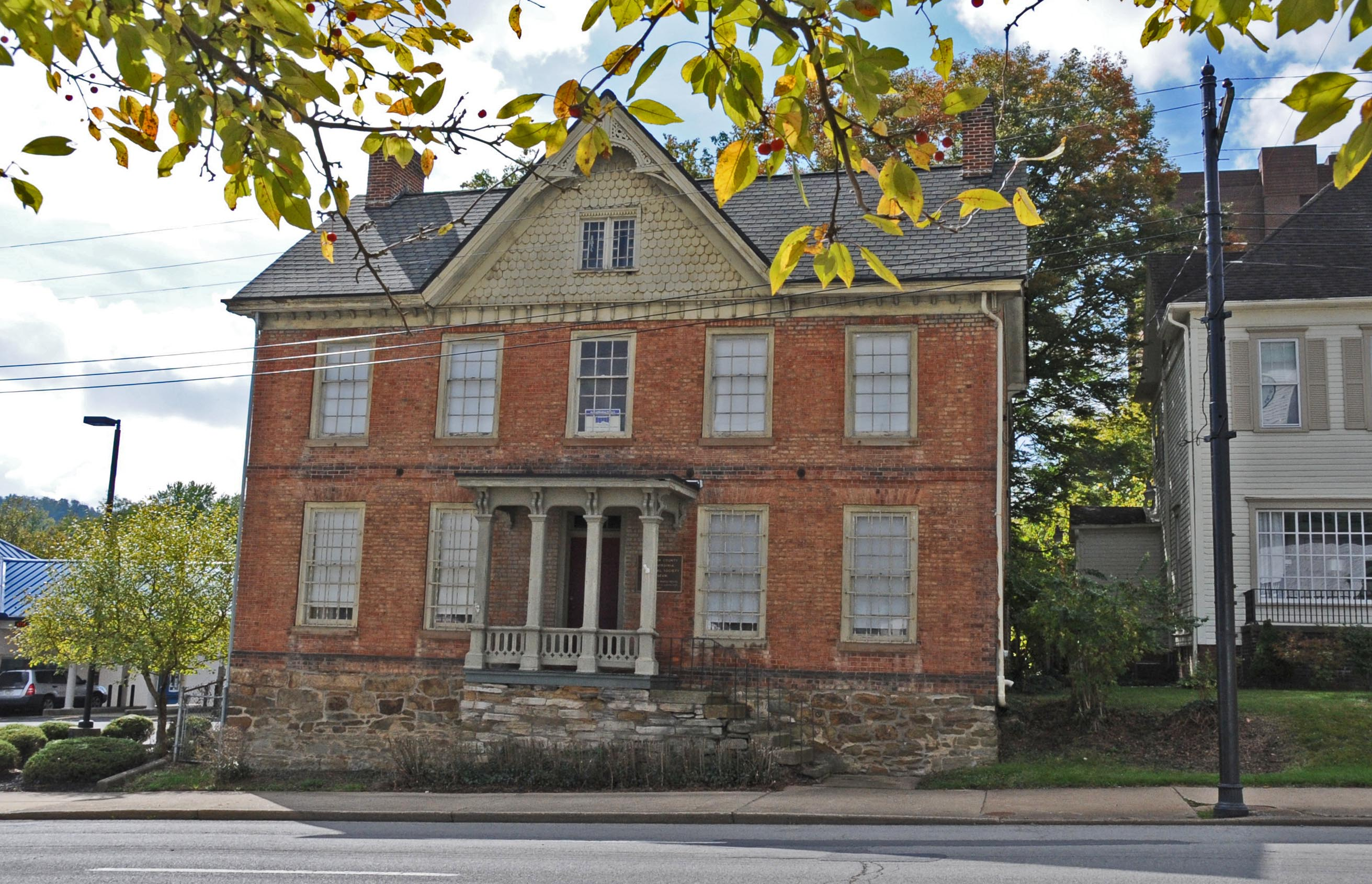

- Location within West Virginia Location within the United States
- Location: 123 W. Main St., Clarksburg, West Virginia
- Coordinates: 39°16′42″N 80°20′9″W
- Area: 0.3 acres (0.12 ha)
- Built: 1807
- Part of: Clarksburg Downtown Historic District (ID82004794)
- NRHP reference No.: 79002580

Significant dates
- Added to NRHP: September 25, 1979
- Designated CP: April 12, 1982

The Stealey–Goff–Vance House, also known as the Amy Roberts Vance House, is a historic home located at Clarksburg, Harrison County, West Virginia. It was originally built about 1807, and is a gable roofed two-story brick dwelling. It sits on a high coursed rubble foundation. The house was remodeled about 1891, with the addition of Victorian embellishment. These modifications include the front gable, porch, and ornate cornice millwork. The house was purchased in 1933 by Amy Roberts Vance, mother of Cyrus Vance. In 1967, the property was sold to the Harrison County Historical Society.

It was listed on the National Register of Historic Places in 1979.
