= Glen Elk Historic District =

Historic house in West Virginia, United States

- U.S. National Register of Historic Places
- U.S. Historic district
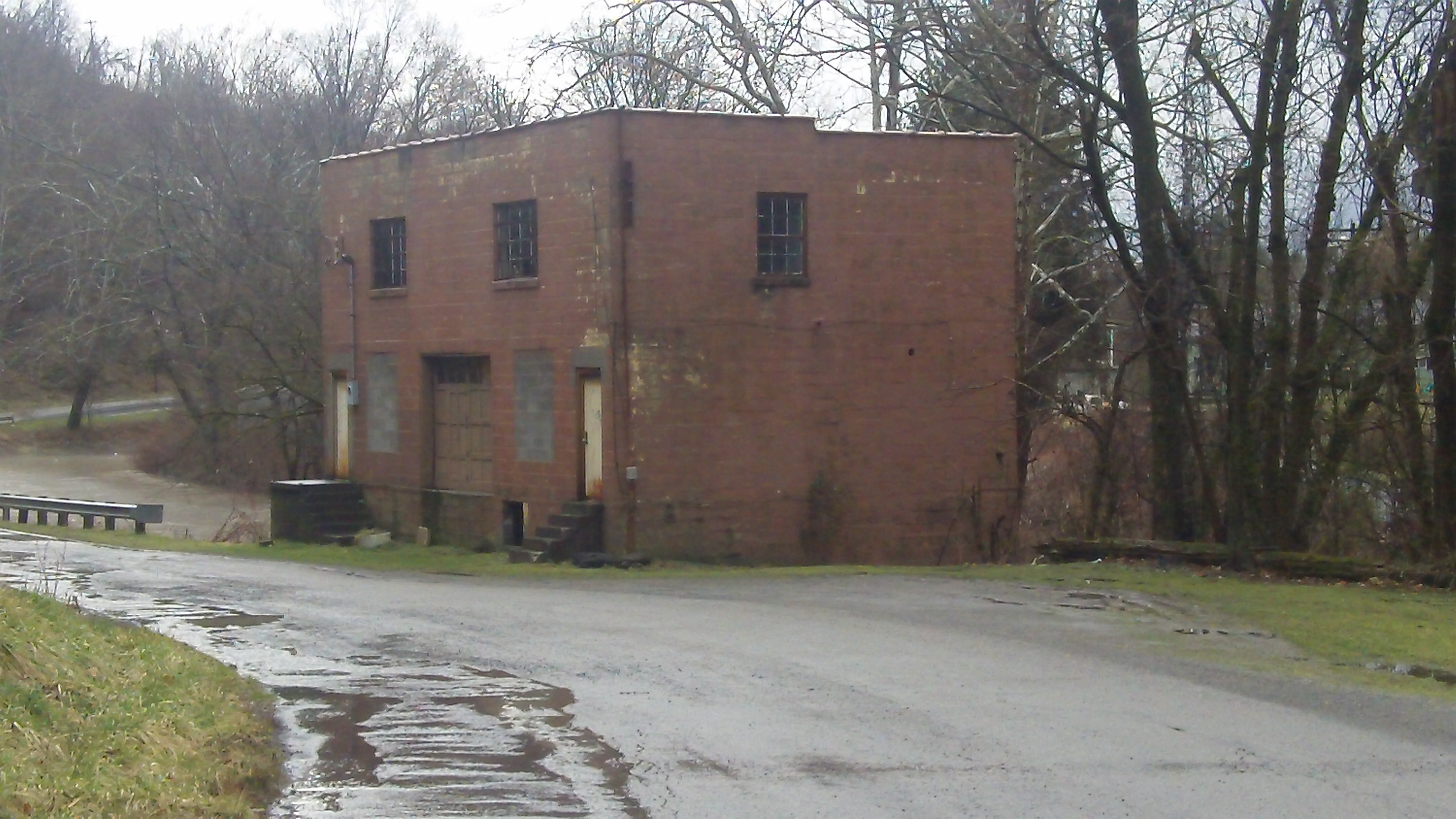
- Building at 301 Sandy Boulevard

- Location within West Virginia Location within the United States
- Location: Roughly bounded by Elk Cr. and the Baltimore & Ohio RR tracks, Clarksburg, West Virginia
- Coordinates: 39°17′3″N 80°20′20″W
- Area: 62 acres (25 ha)
- Architectural style: Queen Anne, Italianate, Early Commercial
- NRHP reference No.: 93001232
- Added to NRHP: November 24, 1993

Glen Elk Historic District is a national historic district located at Clarksburg, Harrison County, West Virginia. The district encompasses 131 contributing buildings north of the central business district of Clarksburg. The area was developed after 1898, and contains a mixture of residential and commercial buildings. They include commercial warehouses built of brick and stone, small commercial buildings, housing specialty shops and eateries, and frame dwellings. Located in the district is the Baltimore and Ohio Railroad Depot (1903).

It was listed on the National Register of Historic Places in 1993.

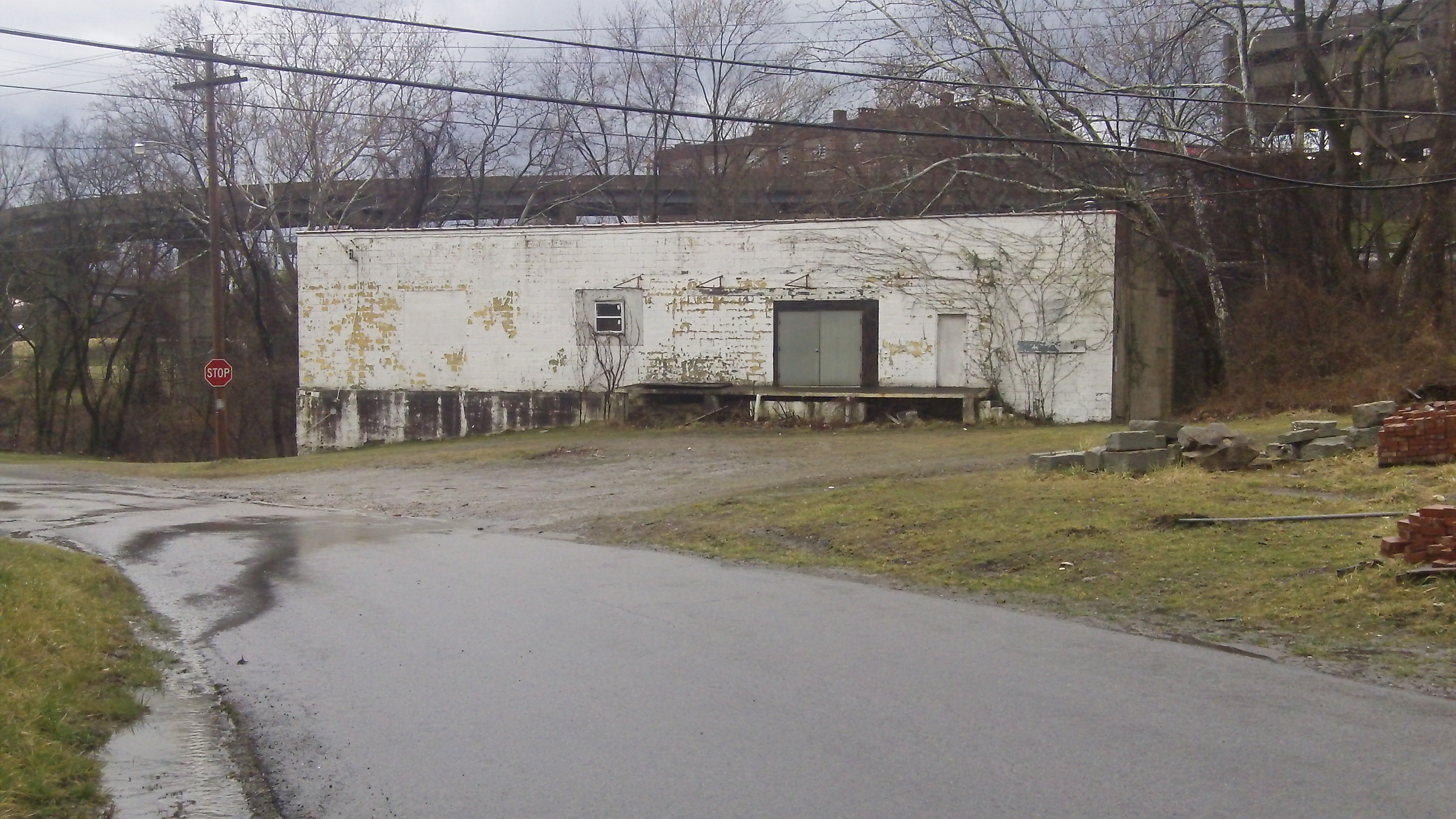
Clarksburg Arts Center Warehouse
