= Edgewood Manor =

Historic house in West Virginia, United States

- U.S. National Register of Historic Places
- Location within West Virginia Location within the United States
- Location: 0.25 mi. N of US 50 interchange on US 19, Clarksburg, West Virginia
- Coordinates: 39°18′28″N 80°21′5″W
- Built: 1914
- Architect: Ford, Steven Wardner
- Architectural style: Bungalow/Craftsman
- NRHP reference No.: 05000662
- Added to NRHP: July 06, 2005

Edgewood Manor is located in Clarksburg, West Virginia on the east side of US Route 19 and State Route 20 North just one-fourth of a mile off of the West Pike Street Exit off Route 50. Another much older house of the same name, Edgewood (Bunker Hill, West Virginia), where a Confederate general died in 1863, is located far to the east in another West Virginia county.

== Morgan Family ==
Haze Morgan (1876-1952), a lawyer in the Clarksburg area, was a member of the Morgan family, that has a substantial historic associations with western Virginia and West Virginia. Haze Morgan practiced law with John W. Davis, the only West Virginian ever nominated by a political party for President of the United States (but who lost to Calvin Coolidge). Haze Morgan had two famous great uncles: Colonel Morgan Morgan, first known white settler in what became West Virginia and who built a cabin near Bunker Hill in 1724 (a monument concerning which Haze Morgan was responsible), and General Zackquill Morgan, who founded Morgantown in 1766. Zackquill's grandson, Francis Harrison Pierpont, who represents West Virginia in the National Statuary Hall Collection, became an abolitionist after a tour of Mississippi before the American Civil War but unsuccessfully opposed Virginia's secession. An avid supporter of President Abraham Lincoln, he served as governor of the Virginia counties that broke away to become West Virginia, and later as the Reconstruction Era governor of Virginia.

== Architecture ==
Architect Stephen Warder Ford designed the home per a commission from Haze Morgan, who wanted it as a residence. It was completed in 1914. The name reflects its construction by day labor at the edge of the woods. Edgewood Manor is a buff brick 2½ story Craftsman home capped by a medium tiled hip roof with one hipped-roof dormer on the west side with three chimneys extending above the roofline. Edgewood Manor is eligible for listing in the National Register under Criterion C: Architecture as an outstanding example of an architect-designed Craftsman-style residence. The period of significance is 1914, which was the year construction was complete. Edgewood Manor has retains its original character and design elements with only minor later changes.

== Grounds ==
The estate includes many trees dating from the 1920s, including Pin Oaks, Butternuts, several Species of Pines, Hawthornes, Beech, large rhododendron, one Native American chestnut that is a grand specimen from the days before blight. Two of these trees are registered state and national champions.
