= Quality Hill Historic District (Clarksburg, West Virginia) =

Historic district in West Virginia, United States

- U.S. National Register of Historic Places
- U.S. Historic district
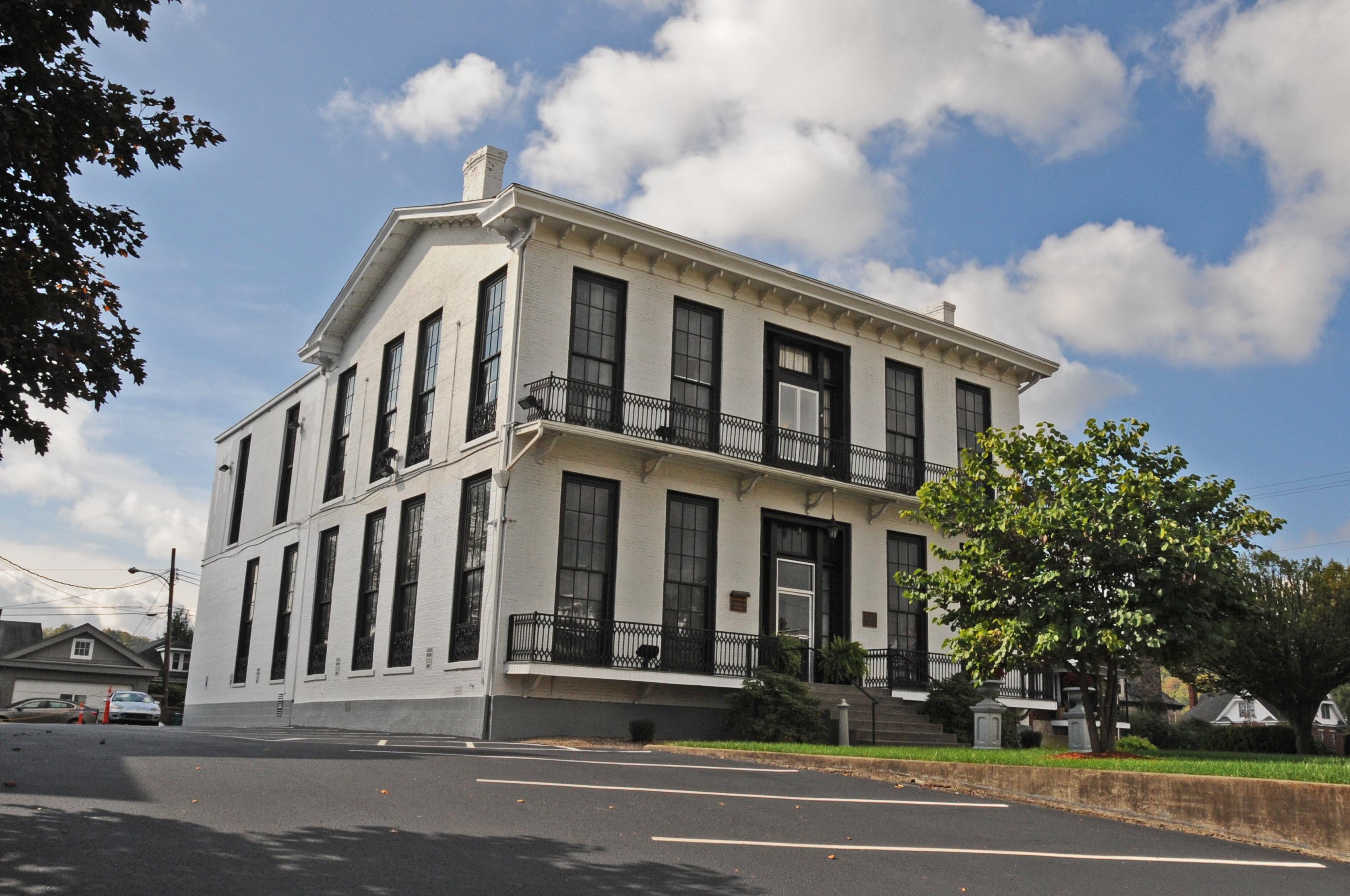
- Burton Despard house

- Location within West Virginia Location within the United States
- Location: East Main St., Clarksburg, West Virginia
- Coordinates: 39°16′43″N 80°19′55″W
- Area: 14 acres (5.7 ha)
- Architect: Multiple
- Architectural style: Late 19th And 20th Century Revivals, Bungalow/craftsman, Late Victorian
- NRHP reference No.: 85001815
- Added to NRHP: August 22, 1985

Quality Hill Historic District is a national historic district located in Clarksburg, West Virginia, United States. The district encompasses 33 contributing buildings in the East Main Street and Jackson Square areas; most are residential buildings date from 1880 to 1910. The oldest, the Burton Despard house, dates from about 1850. They reflect a variety of popular architectural styles from the late-19th and early-20th centuries. Notable buildings include the Maxwell-Duncan House (c. 1872), Virgil Highland House (1903–1905), and Robinson-Haynes House/American Red Cross (1895–1897).

It was listed on the National Register of Historic Places in 1985.
