= National Register of Historic Places listings in West Virginia =

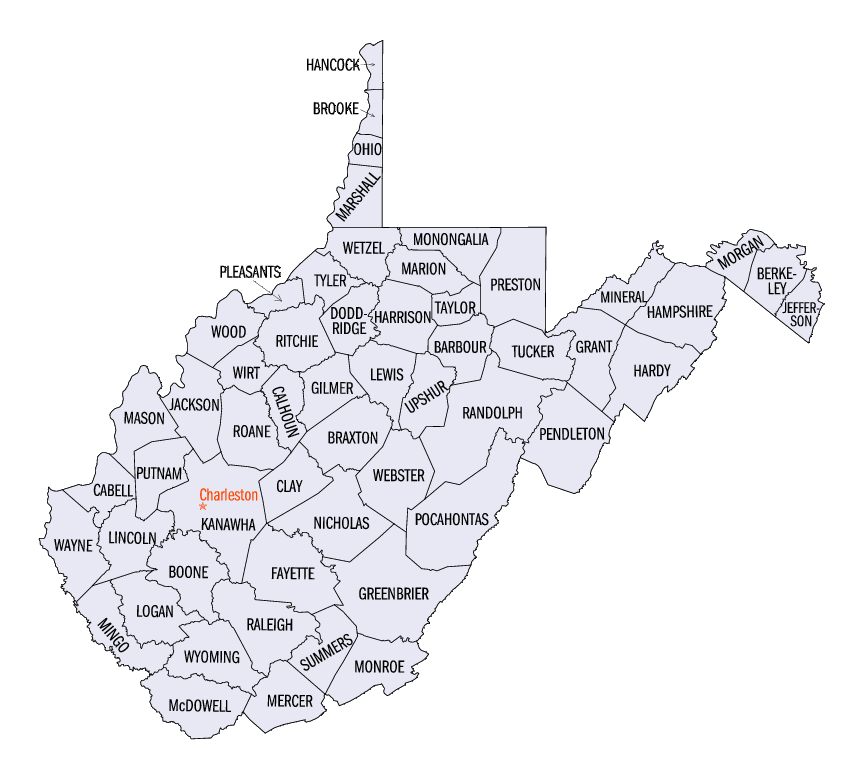
West Virginia counties clickable map

This is a list of properties and historic districts in West Virginia that are listed on the National Register of Historic Places. There are listings in every one of West Virginia's 55 counties.

Listings range from prehistoric sites such as Grave Creek Mound, to Cool Spring Farm in the state's eastern panhandle, one of the state's first homesteads, to relatively newer, yet still historical, residences and commercial districts.

Contents: Counties in West Virginia

Barbour - Berkeley - Boone - Braxton - Brooke - Cabell - Calhoun - Clay - Doddridge - Fayette - Gilmer - Grant - Greenbrier - Hampshire - Hancock - Hardy - Harrison - Jackson - Jefferson - Kanawha - Lewis - Lincoln - Logan - Marion - Marshall - Mason - McDowell - Mercer - Mineral - Mingo - Monongalia - Monroe - Morgan - Nicholas - Ohio - Pendleton - Pleasants - Pocahontas - Preston - Putnam - Raleigh - Randolph - Ritchie - Roane - Summers - Taylor - Tucker - Tyler - Upshur - Wayne - Webster - Wetzel - Wirt - Wood - Wyoming

This National Park Service list is complete through NPS recent listings posted August 28, 2026.

== Current listings by county ==
The following are approximate tallies of current listings by county. These counts are based on entries in the National Register Information Database as of April 24, 2008 and new weekly listings posted since then on the National Register of Historic Places web site. There are frequent additions to the listings and occasional delistings and the counts here are approximate and not official. New entries are added to the official Register on a weekly basis. Also, the counts in this table exclude boundary increase and decrease listings which only modify the area covered by an existing property or district, although carrying a separate National Register reference number.

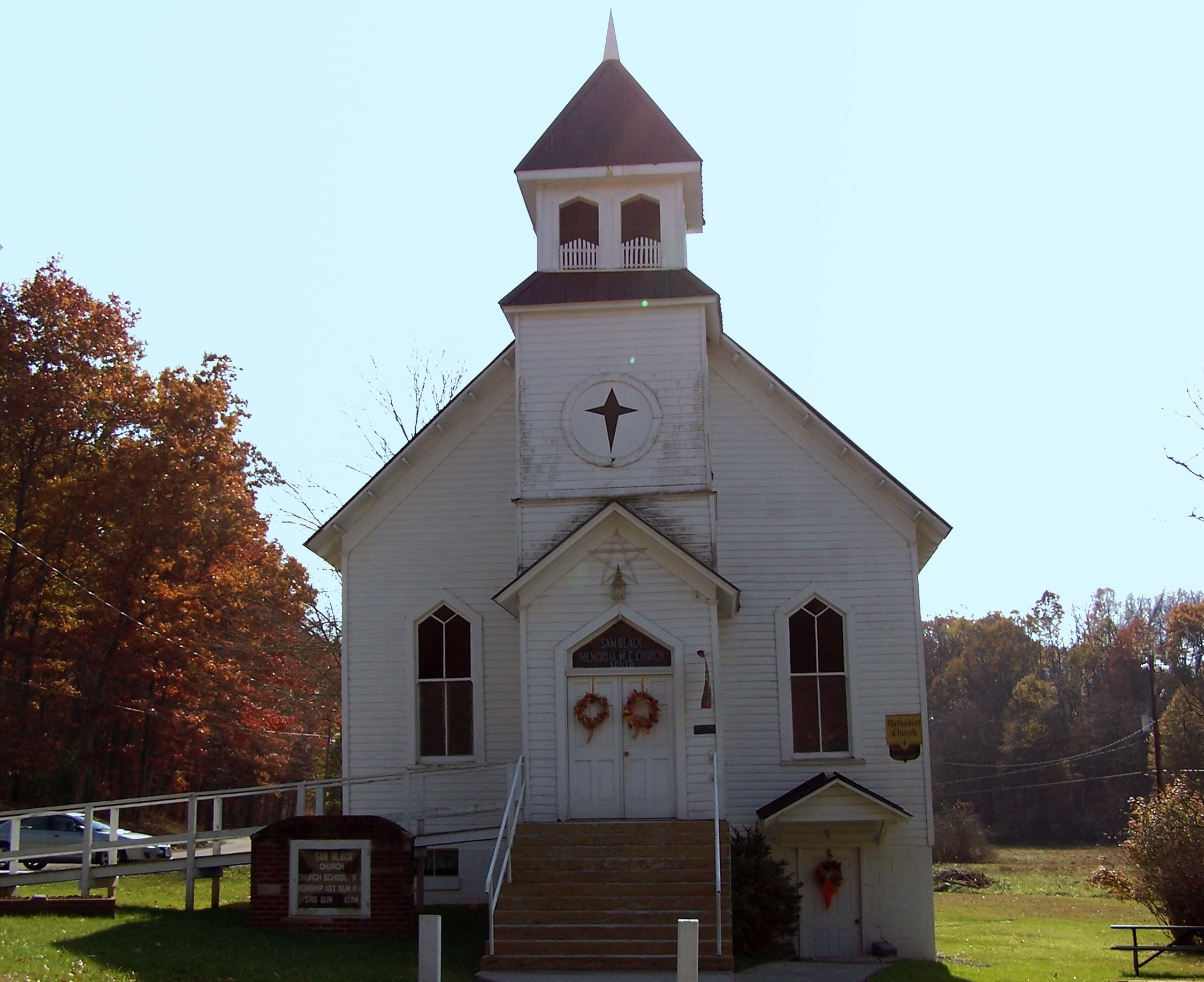
Sam Black Church, in Greenbrier County

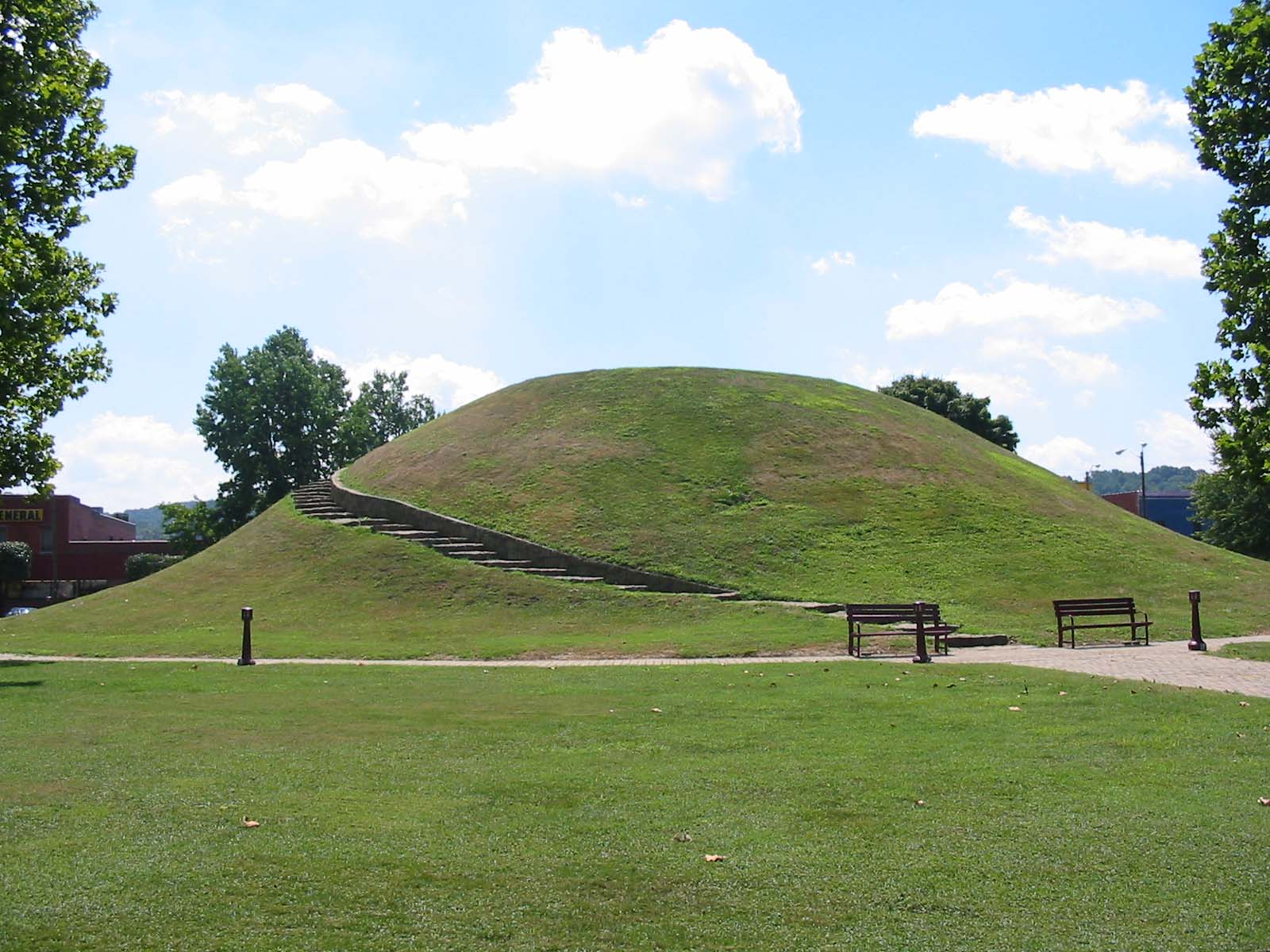
South Charleston Mound, in Kanawha County

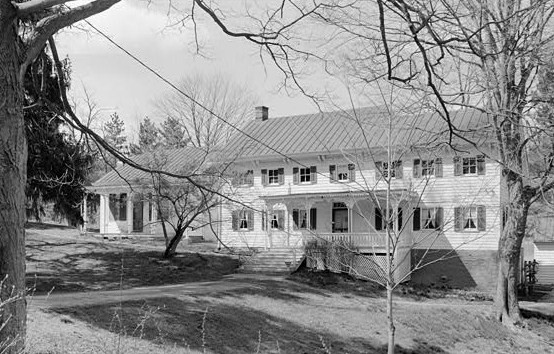
Alexander Campbell Mansion in Brooke County

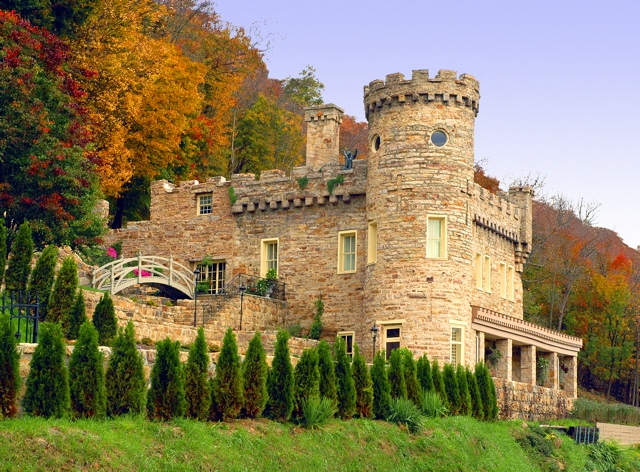
Samuel Taylor Suit Cottage, in Morgan County

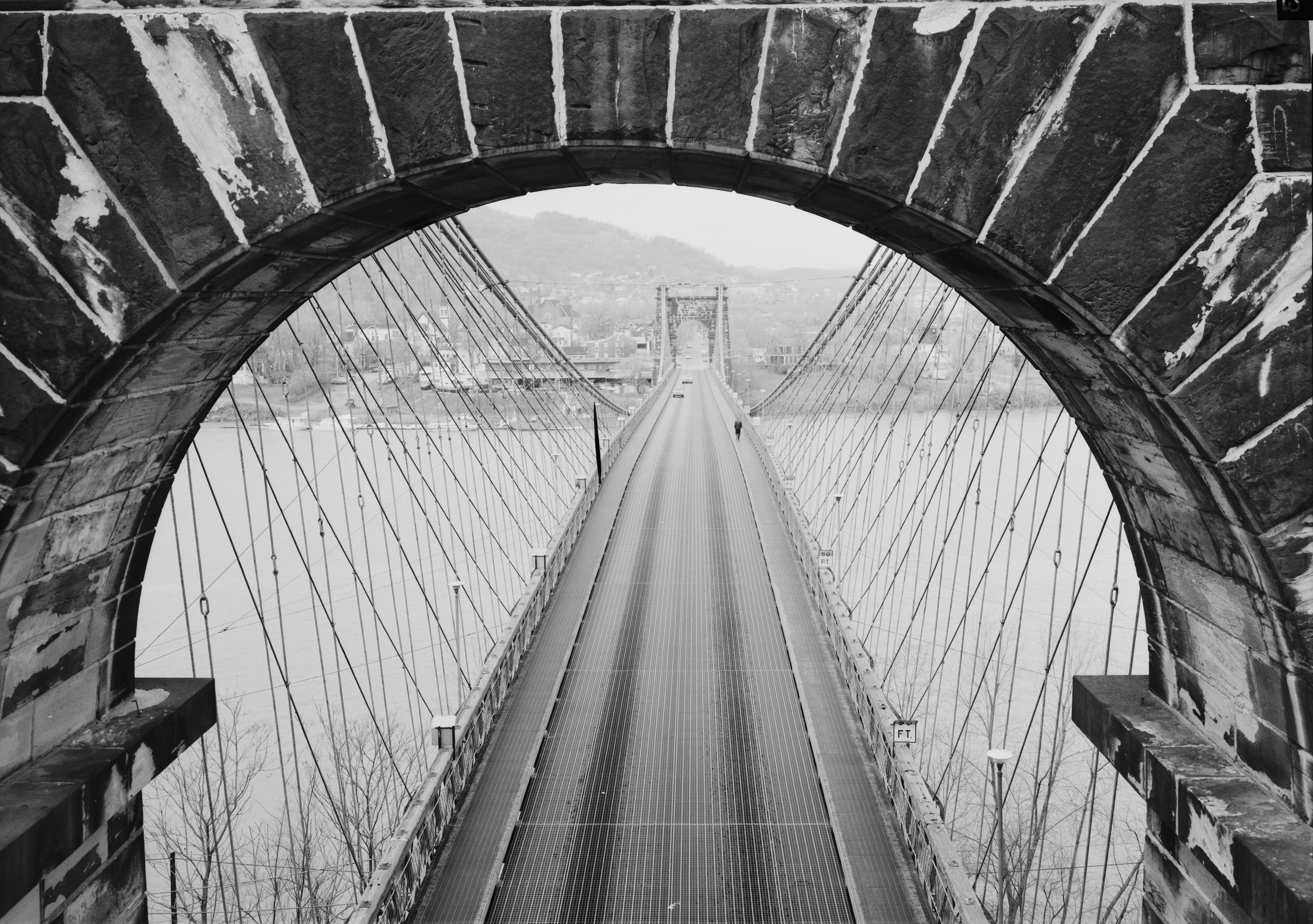
Wheeling Suspension Bridge in Ohio County

| | County | # of Sites | Region |
|---|---|---|---|
| 1 | Barbour | 13 | Mountaineer Country |
| 2 | Berkeley | 121 | Eastern Panhandle |
| 3 | Boone | 4 | Metro Valley |
| 4 | Braxton | 10 | Mountain Lakes |
| 5 | Brooke | 24 | Northern Panhandle |
| 6 | Cabell | 43 | Metro Valley |
| 7 | Calhoun | 2 | Mid-Ohio Valley |
| 8 | Clay | 1 | Mountain Lakes |
| 9 | Doddridge | 9 | Mountaineer Country |
| 10 | Fayette | 28 | New River/Greenbrier Valley |
| 11 | Gilmer | 10 | Mountain Lakes |
| 12 | Grant | 7 | Potomac Highlands |
| 13 | Greenbrier | 47 | New River/Greenbrier Valley |
| 14 | Hampshire | 30 | Potomac Highlands |
| 15 | Hancock | 11 | Northern Panhandle |
| 16 | Hardy | 25 | Potomac Highlands |
| 17 | Harrison | 22 | Mountaineer Country |
| 18 | Jackson | 11 | Mid-Ohio Valley |
| 19 | Jefferson | 89 | Eastern Panhandle |
| 20 | Kanawha | 91 | Metro Valley |
| 21 | Lewis | 14 | Mountain Lakes |
| 22 | Lincoln | 2 | Metro Valley |
| 23 | Logan | 5 | Metro Valley |
| 24 | Marion | 24 | Mountaineer Country |
| 25 | Marshall | 13 | Northern Panhandle |
| 26 | Mason | 13 | Metro Valley |
| 27 | McDowell | 18 | New River/Greenbrier Valley |
| 28 | Mercer | 20 | New River/Greenbrier Valley |
| 29 | Mineral | 11 | Potomac Highlands |
| 30 | Mingo | 8 | Metro Valley |
| 31 | Monongalia | 48 | Mountaineer Country |
| 32 | Monroe | 26 | New River/Greenbrier Valley |
| 33 | Morgan | 20 | Eastern Panhandle |
| 34 | Nicholas | 13 | Mountain Lakes |
| 35 | Ohio | 55 | Northern Panhandle |
| 36 | Pendleton | 13 | Potomac Highlands |
| 37 | Pleasants | 2 | Mid-Ohio Valley |
| 38 | Pocahontas | 24 | Potomac Highlands |
| 39 | Preston | 22 | Mountaineer Country |
| 40 | Putnam | 7 | Metro Valley |
| 41 | Raleigh | 11 | New River/Greenbrier Valley |
| 42 | Randolph | 39 | Potomac Highlands |
| 43 | Ritchie | 6 | Mid-Ohio Valley |
| 44 | Roane | 7 | Mid-Ohio Valley |
| 45 | Summers | 8 | New River/Greenbrier Valley |
| 46 | Taylor | 6 | Mountaineer Country |
| 47 | Tucker | 11 | Potomac Highlands |
| 48 | Tyler | 10 | Northern Panhandle |
| 49 | Upshur | 7 | Mountain Lakes |
| 50 | Wayne | 9 | Metro Valley |
| 51 | Webster | 7 | Mountain Lakes |
| 52 | Wetzel | 4 | Northern Panhandle |
| 53 | Wirt | 6 | Mid-Ohio Valley |
| 54 | Wood | 48 | Mid-Ohio Valley |
| 55 | Wyoming | 4 | New River/Greenbrier Valley |
| (duplicates) | | (4) | n/a |
| Total: | | 1,135 | n/a |

== See also ==
- List of National Historic Landmarks in West Virginia
- List of bridges on the National Register of Historic Places in West Virginia
