= Ernest C. S. Holmboe =

American architect (1873–1954)

- Born: 1873; Denmark
- Died: 1954 (aged 80–81); Clarksburg, West Virginia
- Occupation: Architect
- Practice: Holmboe & Lafferty, Holmboe & Pogue
- Buildings: Empire National Bank Building, Salem College, Ritchie County Courthouse

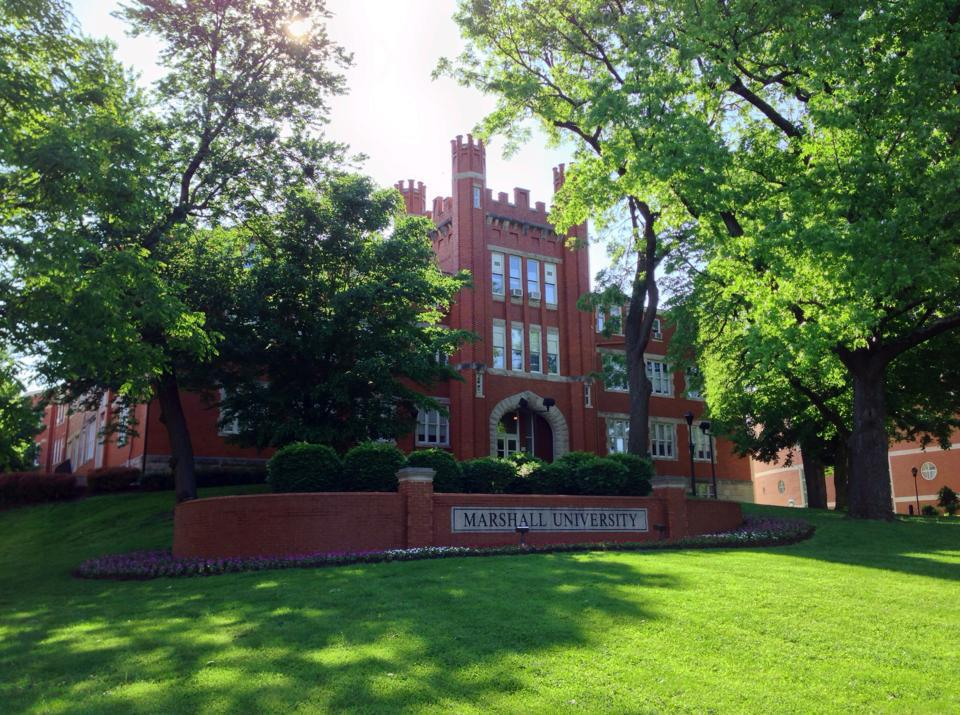
Old Main, Marshall College, 1905.

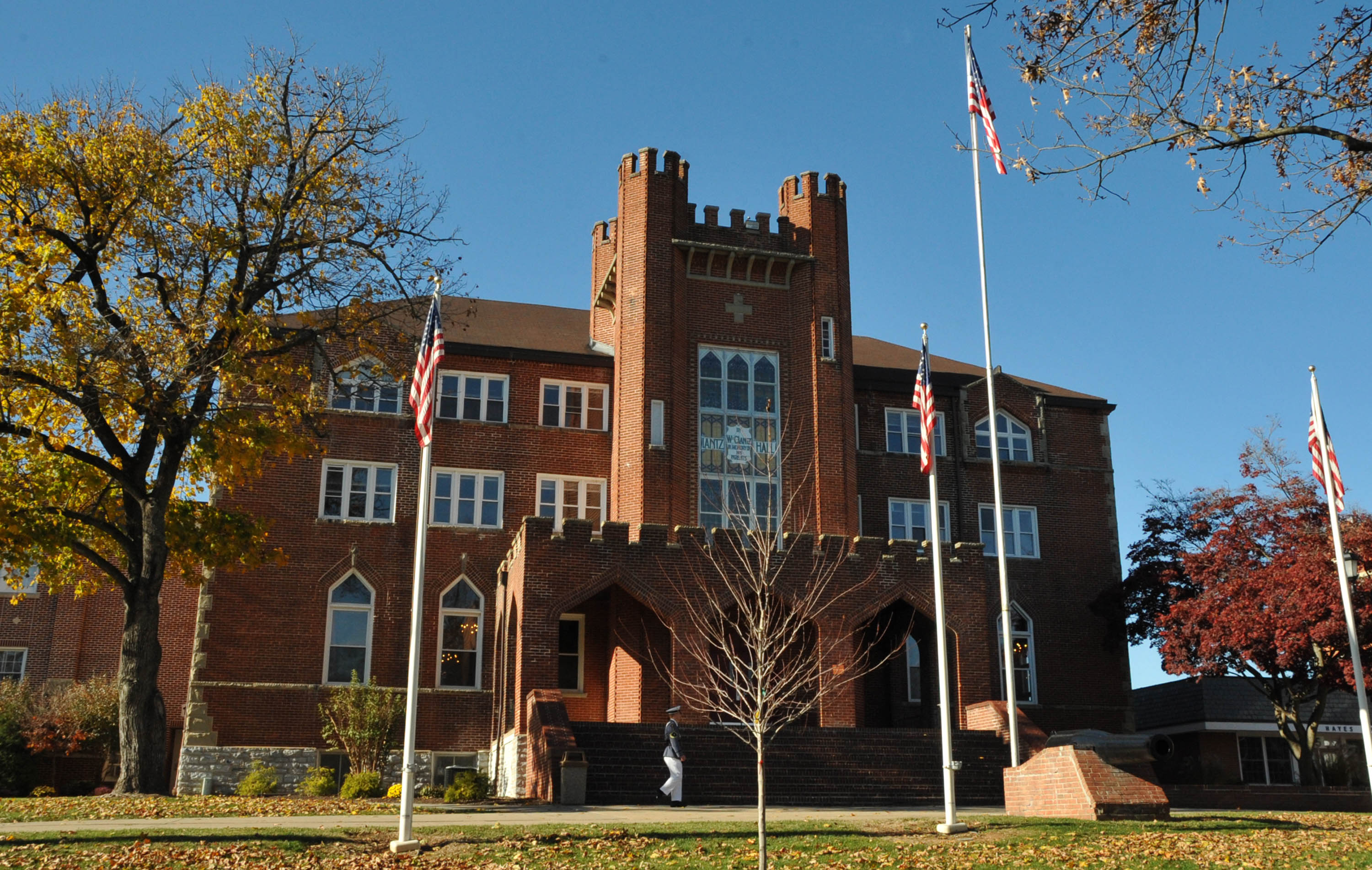
Lantz Hall, Massanutten Academy, 1907.

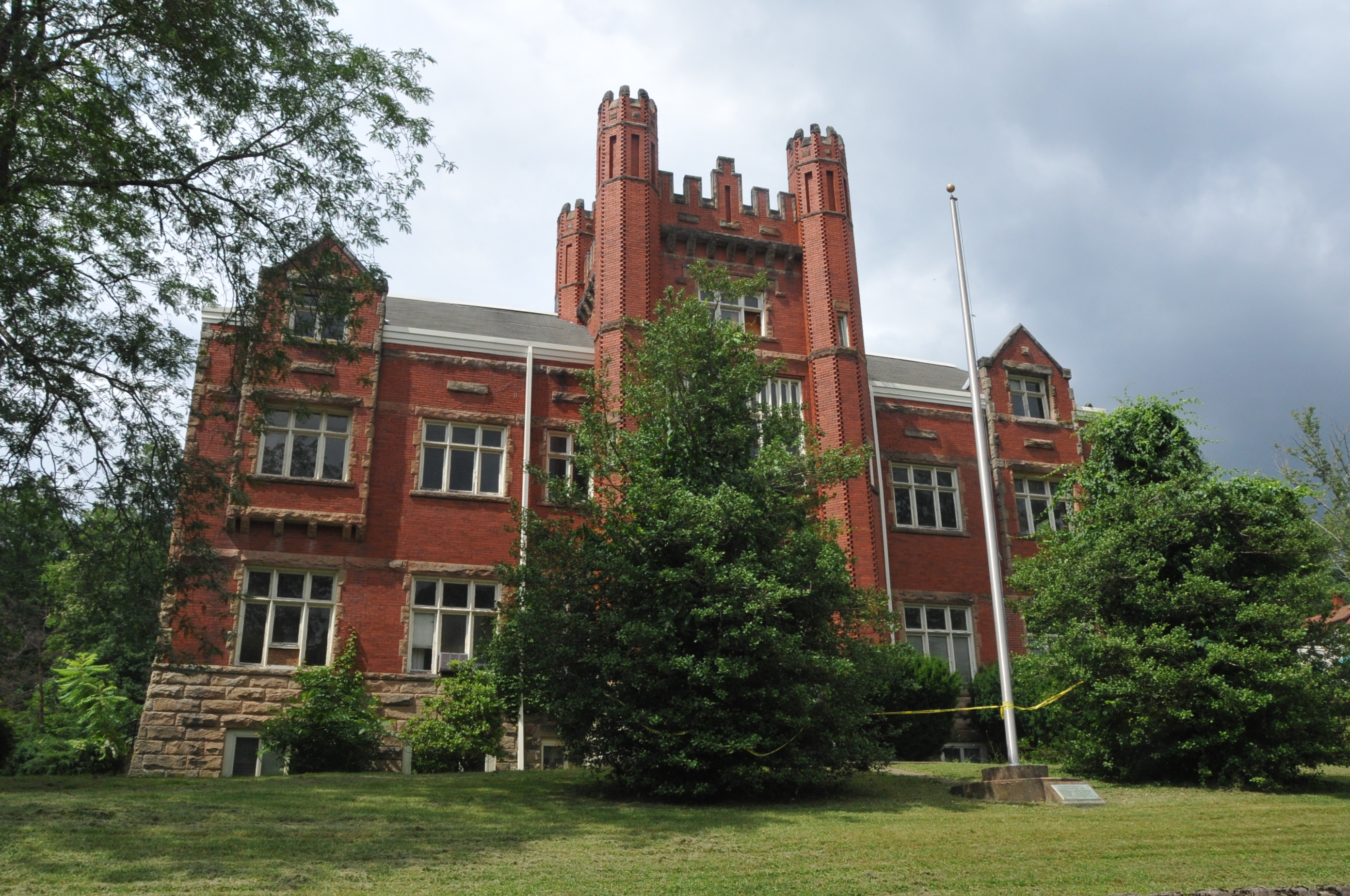
Administration Building, Salem College, 1909.

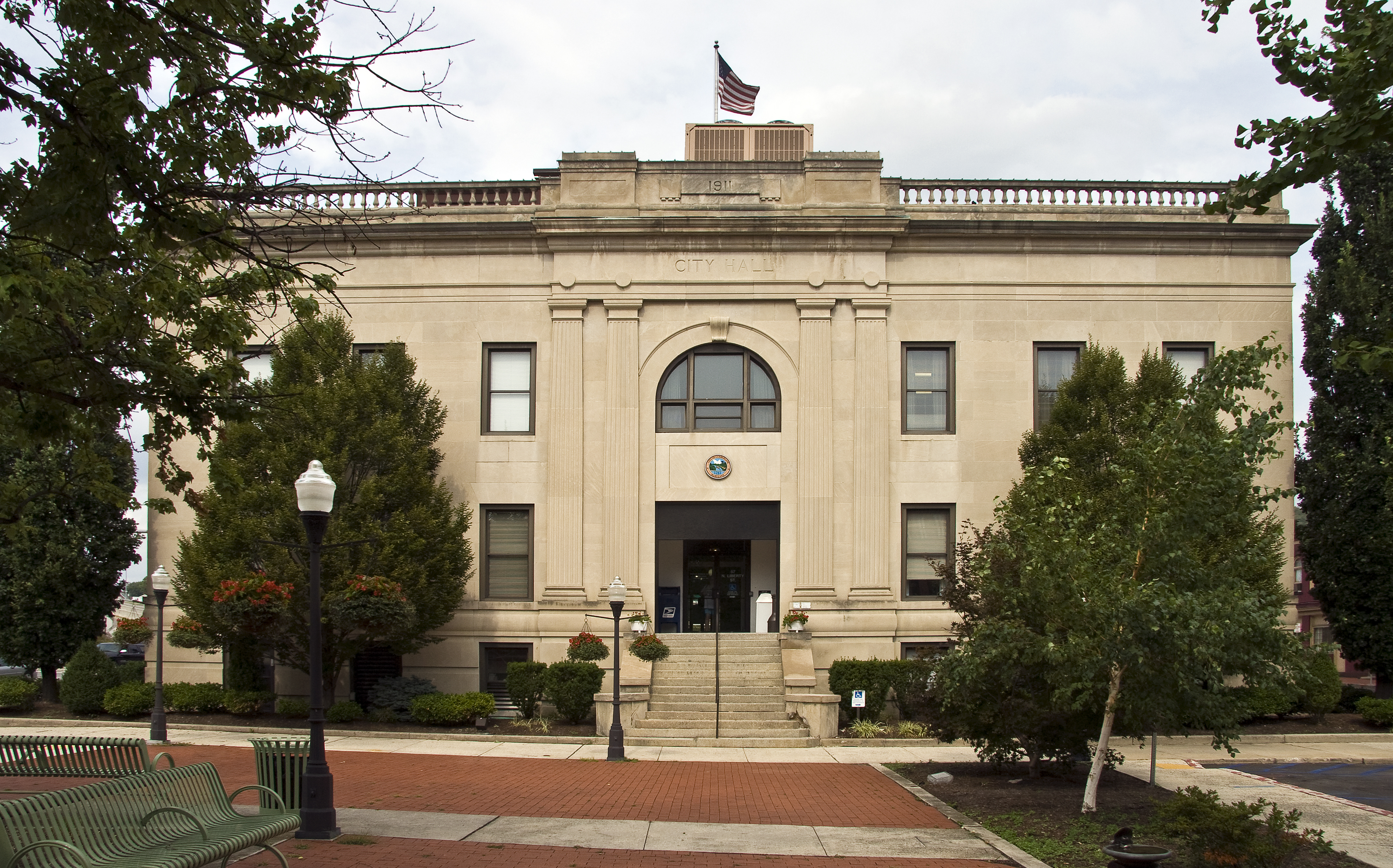
Cumberland City Hall, Cumberland, 1910.

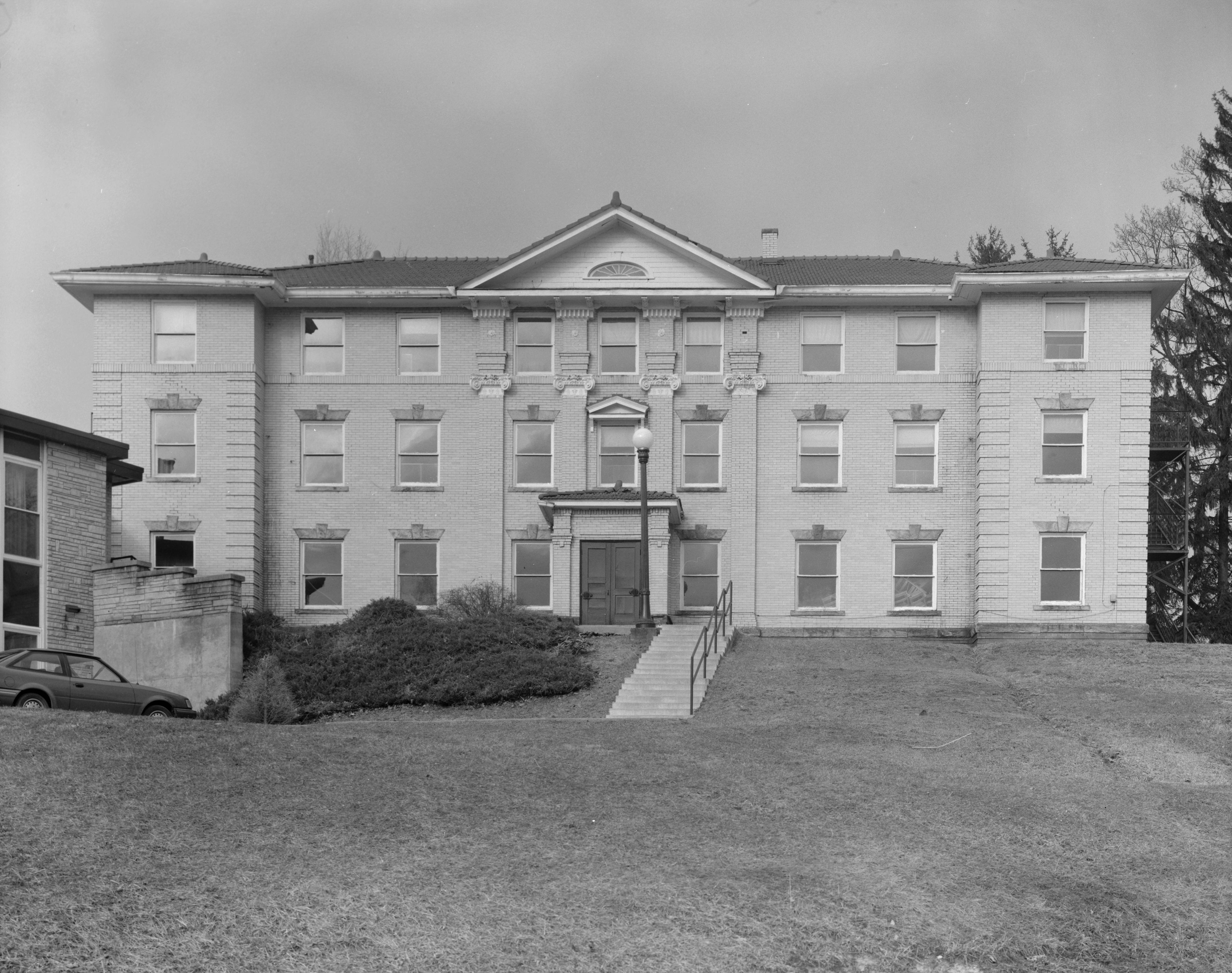
Whitescarver Hall, Broaddus College, 1911.

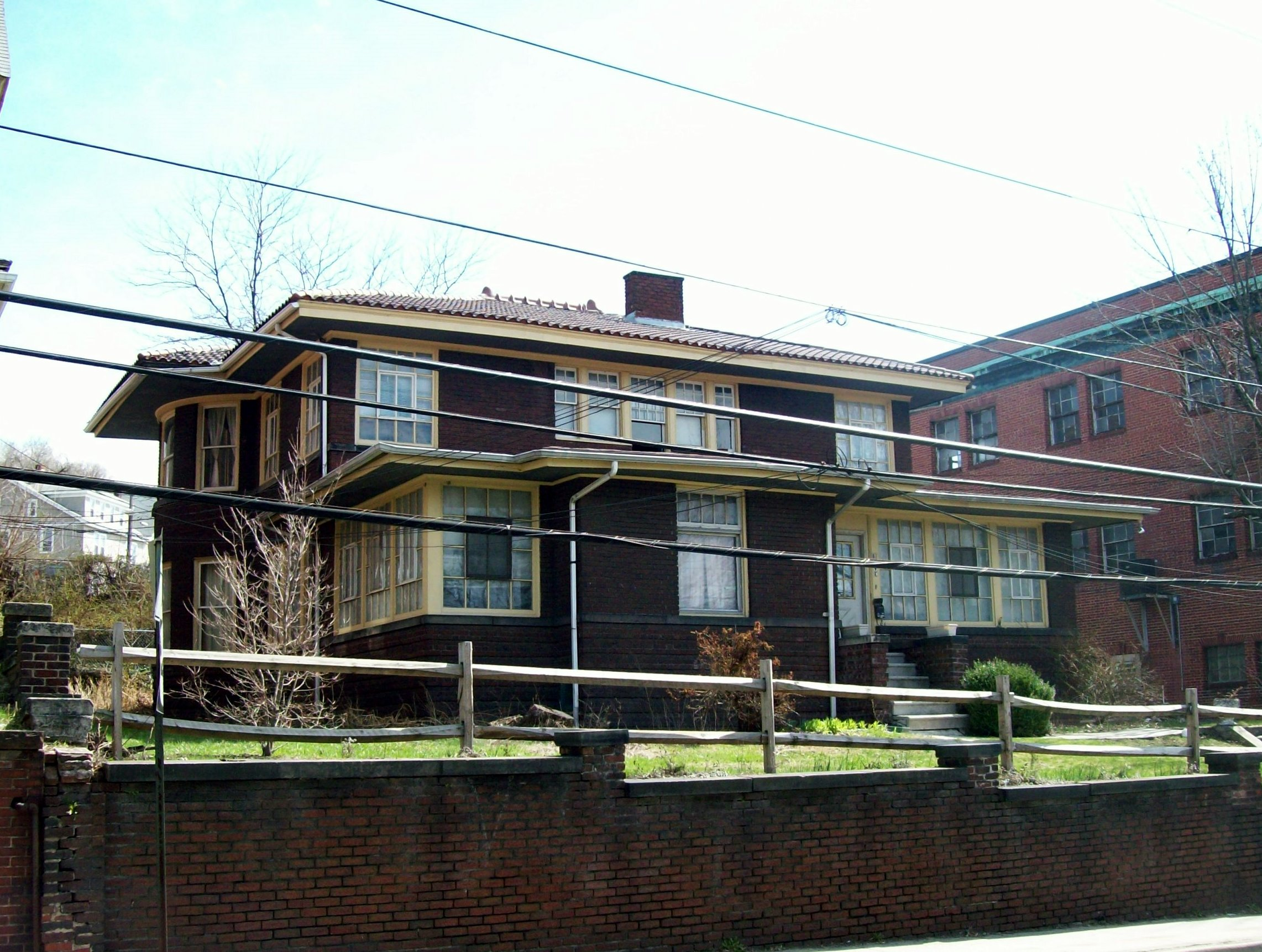
Thos. W. Koon House, Cumberland, 1912.

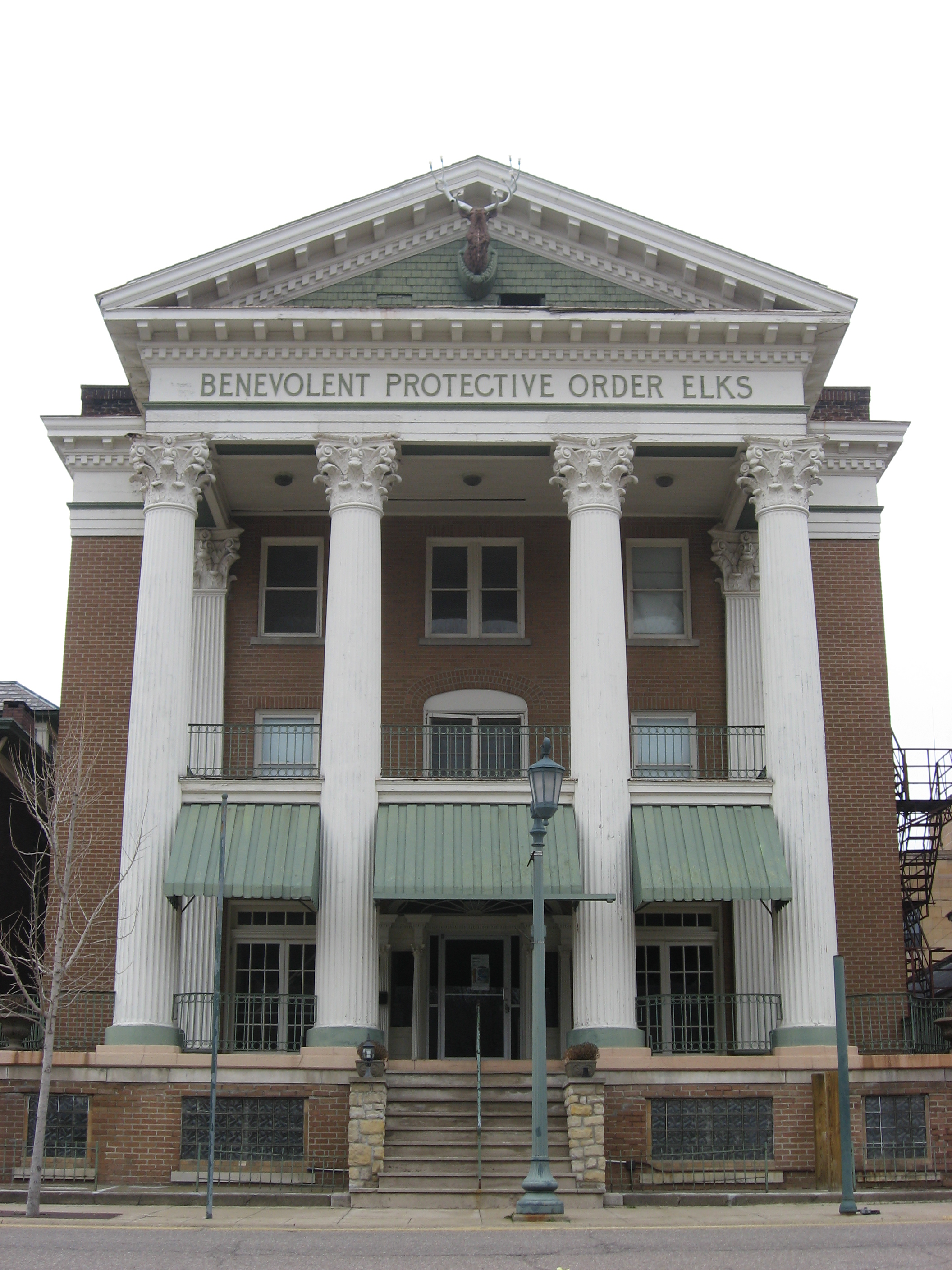
Elks Club, East Liverpool, 1914.

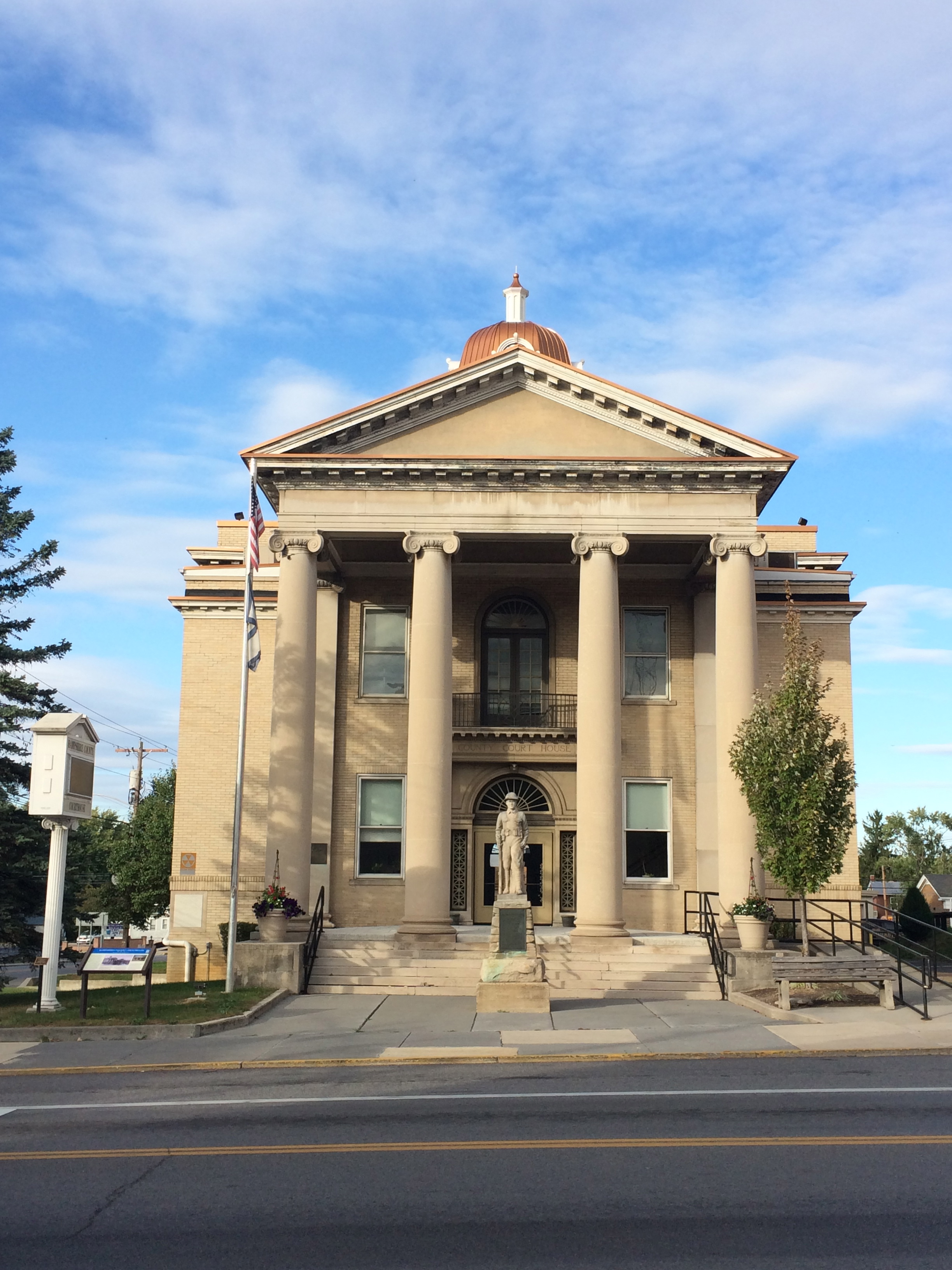
County Courthouse, Romney, 1921.

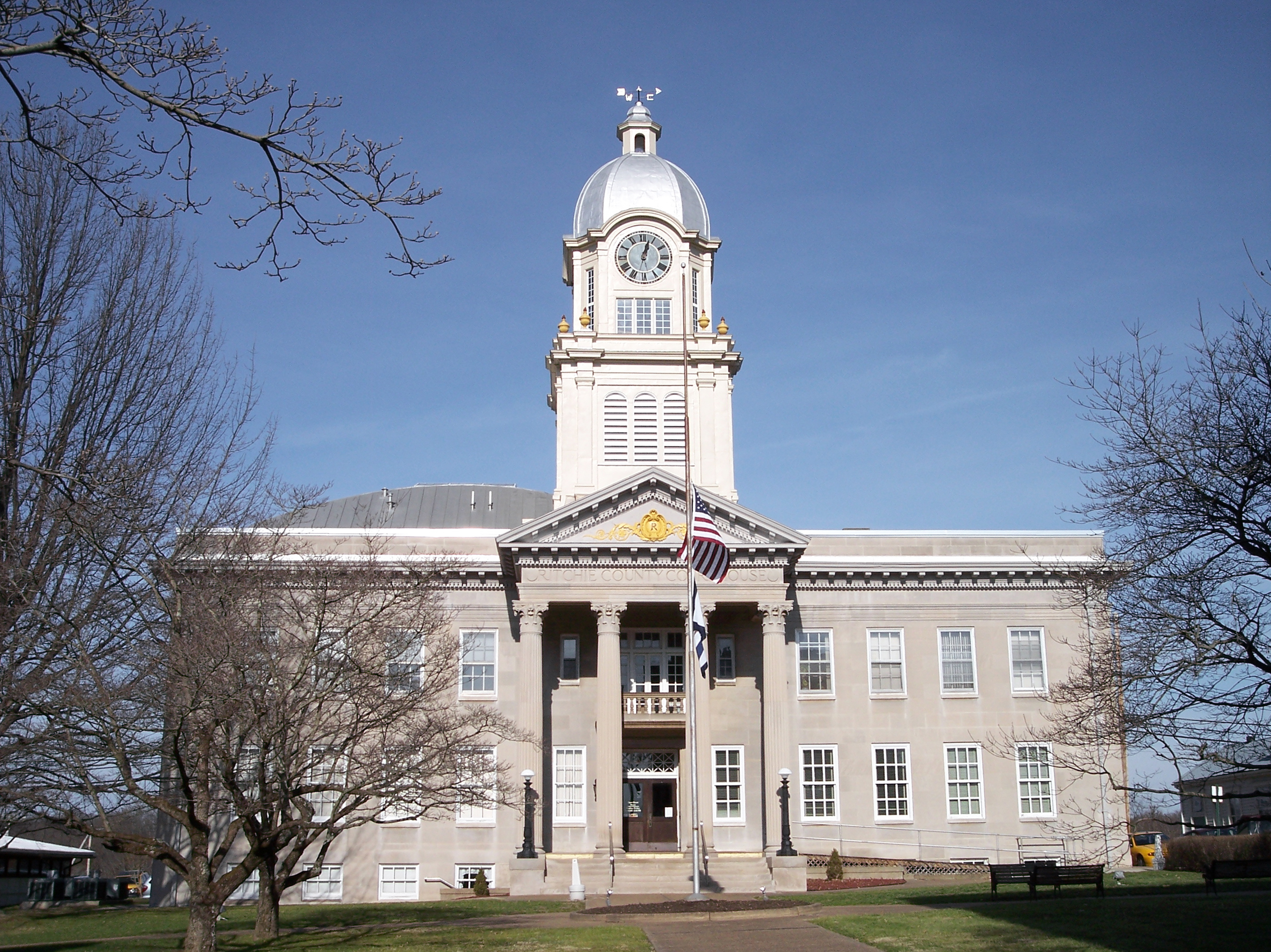
County Courthouse, Harrisville, 1922.

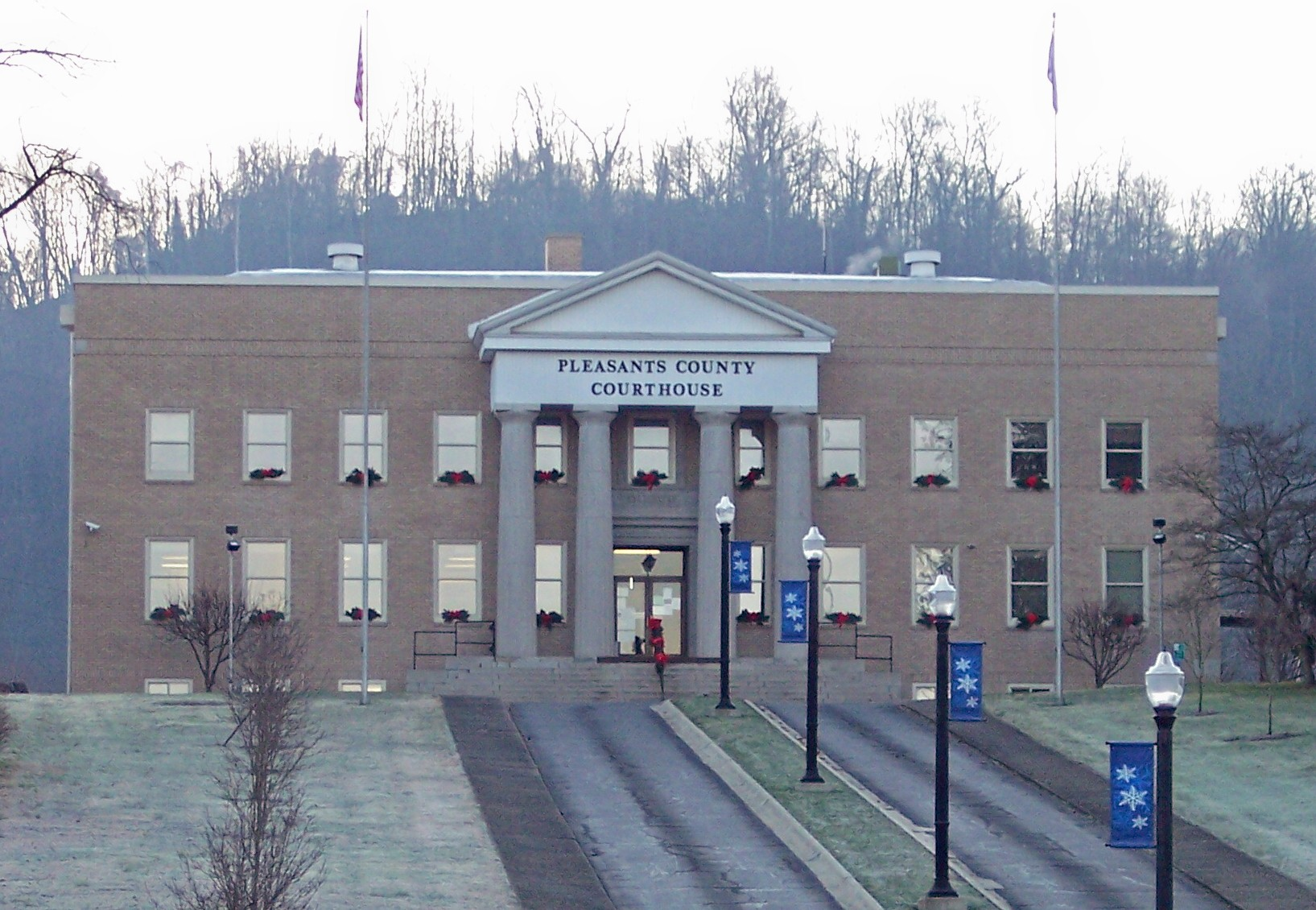
County Courthouse, St. Marys, 1923.

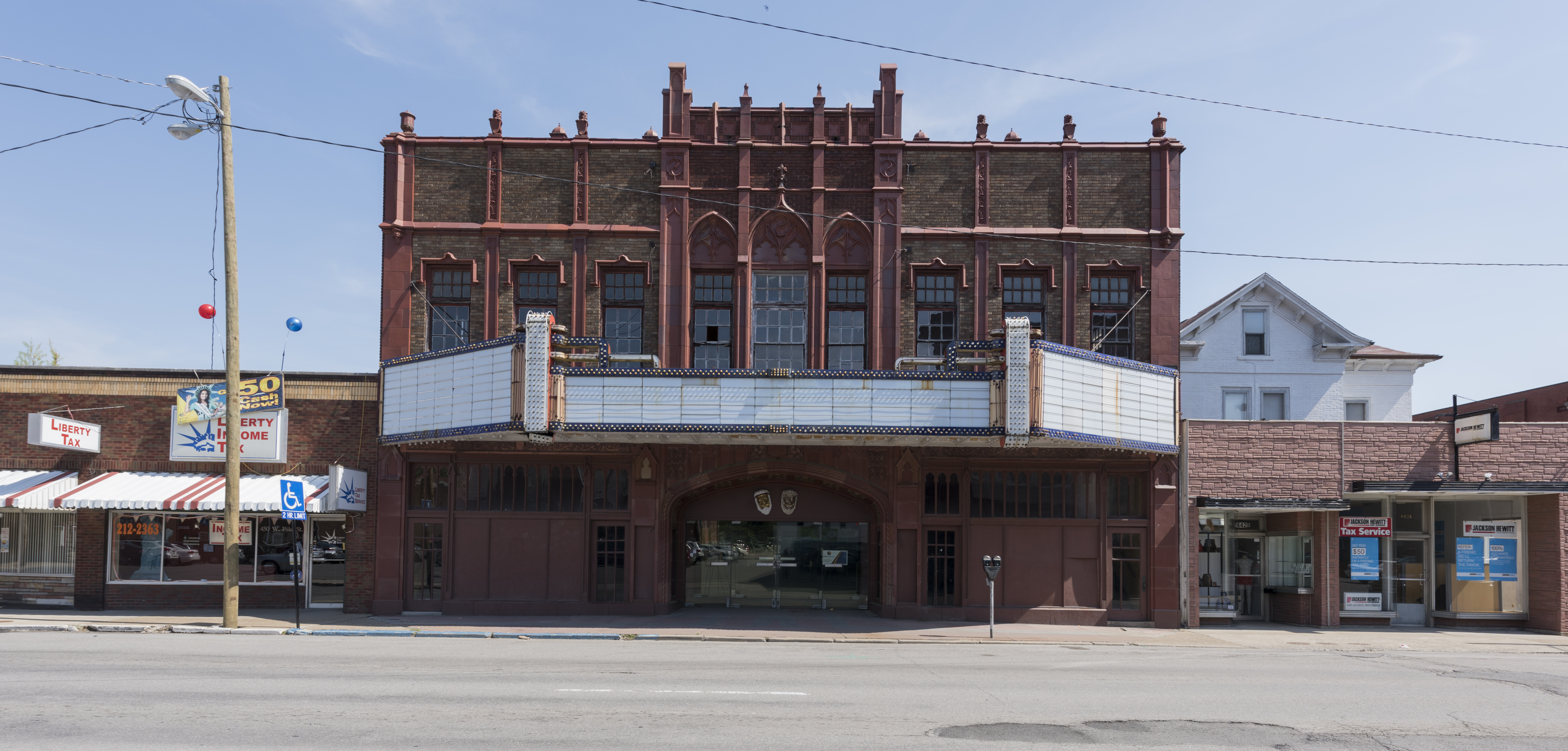
Robinson Grand Theater 1913, and 1927 remodel after fire

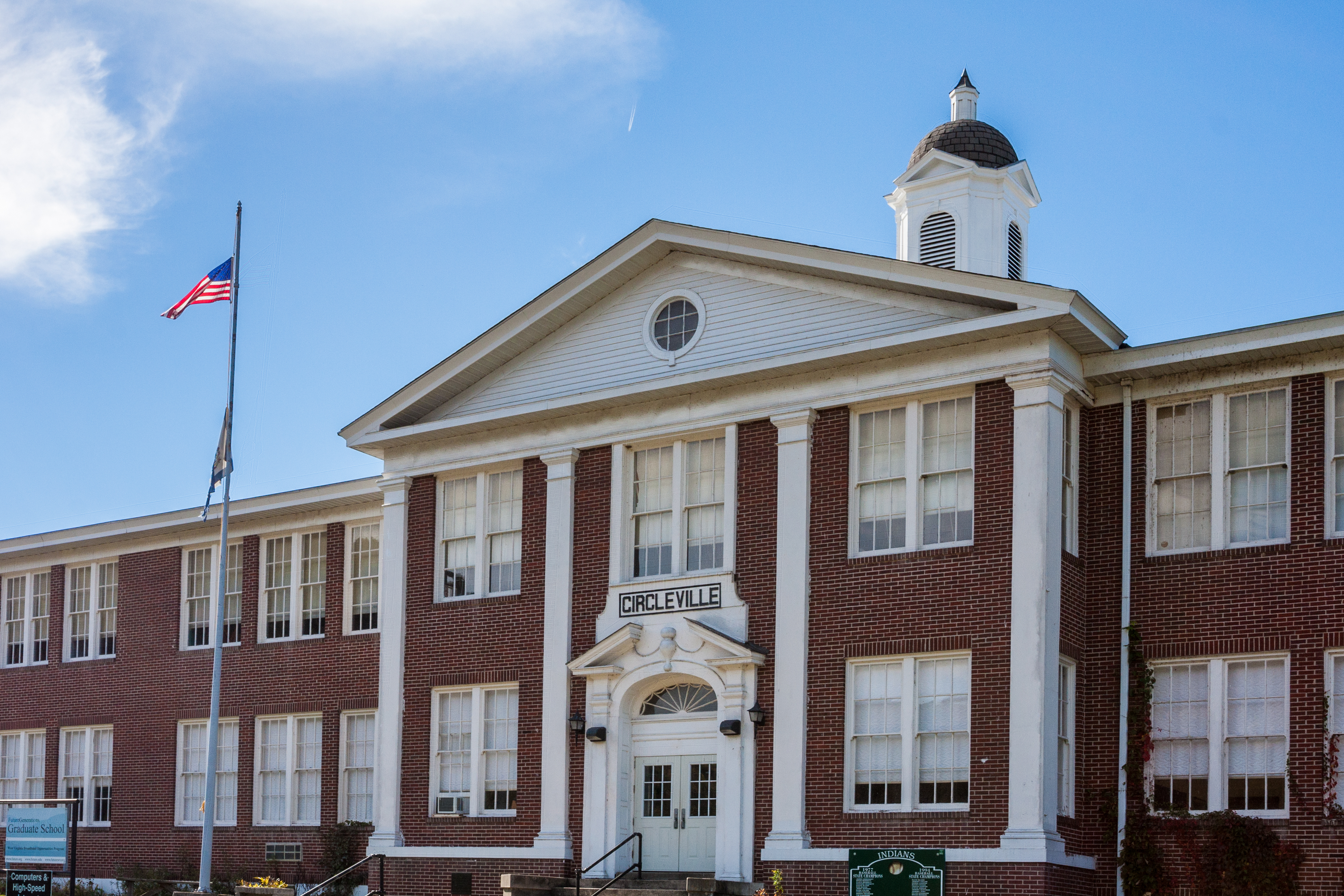
Circleville School, Circleville, 1937.

Ernest C. S. Holmboe (1873–1954) was an American architect, renowned for his contributions to architecture in West Virginia.

== Life and career ==
E. C. S. Holmboe was born in Denmark in 1873, where he studied architecture for four years. He later relocated to Chicago, where he was educated at the Art Institute of Chicago. In the early and mid 1890s he practiced as an architect in Chicago, but by 1899 he had relocated to the much smaller city of Marietta. In 1901 he formed a partnership with Robert C. Lafferty, a native of Wheeling, West Virginia. Lafferty was sent to Clarksburg, West Virginia to open a branch office. Soon afterwards, Holmboe moved the firm's chief office to Clarksburg, and Lafferty ran another branch office, this time at Bluefield. Holmboe & Lafferty grew to become the most prominent architectural firm in the Clarksburg region, but was dissolved in 1920, soon after the end of World War I.

After a brief period alone, Holmboe established a new partnership with Guy M. Pogue, who had been educated by Charles W. Bates and been a practicing architect in Wheeling for five years. Holmboe & Pogue appears to have lasted for only a few years, but completed several major projects, including four county courthouses.

After the dissolution of Holmboe & Pogue, Holmboe practiced on his own at least until the 1940s, though few projects are known. Holmboe died in 1954.

== Influence and legacy ==
Holmboe was well regarded as a designer of fraternal buildings, especially Elks lodges. Buildings of this type by Holmboe & Lafferty were built in such faraway states as Florida and North Dakota.

== Works ==
=== E. C. S. Holmboe, until 1901 ===
- 1899 - Elks Home, 410 Front St, Marietta, Ohio
  - Burned in 2001.
- 1900 - Masonic Temple, 308 Front St, Marietta, Ohio

=== Holmboe & Laffery, 1901-1920 ===
- 1902 - Cottrill Opera House, East Ave, Thomas, West Virginia
- 1902 - Elks Opera House, 212 Federal St, Bluefield, West Virginia
  - Remodeled by the firm in 1908.
- 1902 - Miners' and Merchants' Bank Building, 172 East Ave, Thomas, West Virginia
- 1903 - Bank of Pine Grove Building, Allen Addition St, Pine Grove, West Virginia
- 1903 - Empire National Bank Building, 400 W Main St, Clarksburg, West Virginia
- 1903 - Virgil L. Highland House, 240 E Main St, Clarksburg, West Virginia
- 1904 - Braxton County Jail, Main St, Sutton, West Virginia
- 1904 - Grafton Banking and Trust Building, W Main & Ethel Sts, Grafton, West Virginia
  - Demolished.
- 1904 - St. Mary's Hospital, Washington Ave, Clarksburg, West Virginia
  - Demolished.
- 1904 - West Side School (former), 304 Beech St, Grafton, West Virginia
- 1905 - Garrett County Jail, E Alder St, Oakland, Maryland
  - Demolished in the 1970s.
- 1905 - Old Main, Marshall College, Huntington, West Virginia
- 1906 - McGuffey and Wilson Halls (Remodeling), Ohio University, Athens, Ohio
  - Conversion into dormitories.
- 1906 - Welch High School (former), Howard St, Welch, West Virginia
  - Burned.
- 1907 - First Baptist Church (former), 100 Duhring St, Bluefield, West Virginia
- 1907 - Lantz Hall, Massanutten Academy, Woodstock, Virginia
- 1907 - Morgan County Courthouse, 202 Fairfax St, Berkeley Springs, West Virginia
  - Destroyed by fire in 2006.
- 1907 - Tunnelton Bank Building, North St, Tunnelton, West Virginia
- 1908 - Elks Home, 1015 4th Ave, Huntington, West Virginia
- 1909 - Administration Building, Salem College, Salem, West Virginia
- 1910 - Citizens National Bank Building, 47 Church St, Philippi, West Virginia
- 1910 - Cumberland City Hall, N Center St, Cumberland, Maryland
- 1910 - Elks Home, 411 W Pike St, Clarksburg, West Virginia
  - Burned in 2002.
- 1910 - Haymond Apartments, 444 W Main St, Clarksburg, West Virginia
- 1911 - Rhea Terrace Apartments, Rhea Ter, Fairmont, West Virginia
- 1911 - Whitescarver Hall, Broaddus College, Philippi, West Virginia
- 1912 - Elks Home, 103 W Frederick St, Staunton, Virginia
- 1912 - Elks Home, 425 N Florida Ave, Tampa, Florida
  - Demolished in 1962.
- 1912 - Harpers Ferry High School (Old), 847 Washington St, Harpers Ferry, West Virginia
- 1912 - Thomas W. Koon House, 221 Baltimore Ave, Cumberland, Maryland
- 1912 - Miners Hospital, Hospital Rd, Frostburg, Maryland
  - Demolished in 1997.
- 1913 - Parsons High School, 501 Chestnut St, Parsons, West Virginia
  - Demolished.
- 1913 - Second National Bank Building, 102 S Main St, Culpeper, Virginia
- 1913 - Robinson Grand Theater, 444 West Pike Street, Clarksburg, WV
- 1914 - Columbia Street School, 311 Columbia Street, Cumberland, Maryland
- 1914 - Elks Club, 139 W 5th St, East Liverpool, Ohio
- 1914 - First M. E. Church, 1539 W Pike St, Adamston, West Virginia
- 1914 - Clyde E. Hutchinson House (Sonnencroft), Morgantown Ave, Fairmont, West Virginia
  - Demolished in the 1960s.
- 1914 - Moorefield Graded and High School, 400 N Main St, Moorefield, West Virginia
  - Demolished.
- 1915 - Elks Home, 424 5th St NE, Devils Lake, North Dakota
  - Demolished.
- 1916 - Gilmer County Jail, 201 N Court St, Glenville, West Virginia
- 1916 - Sperry Hall, Massanutten Academy, Woodstock, Virginia
- 1917 - Hepzibah Public School, Shinnston Pk, Hepzibah, West Virginia
- 1918 - Ellsworth School, 504 Cherry St, Middlebourne, West Virginia
- 1918 - Victory High School, 1636 W Pike St, Adamston, West Virginia
- 1920 - Roosevelt-Wilson High School (former), 116 Pennsylvania Ave, Nutter Fort, West Virginia

=== Holmboe & Pogue, from 1920 ===
- 1921 - Hampshire County Courthouse, 50 S High St, Romney, West Virginia
- 1922 - Ritchie County Courthouse, 115 E Main St, Harrisville, West Virginia
- 1922 - Sistersville Junior High School (former), Work St, Sistersville, West Virginia
- 1922 - Tyler County Courthouse (Remodeling), 121 Court St, Middlebourne, West Virginia
- 1923 - Virginia Lee Harrison Gymnasium, Massanutten Academy, Woodstock, Virginia
  - Presently a dormitory.
- 1924 - Pleasants County Courthouse, 301 Court Ln, St. Marys, West Virginia

=== E. C. S. Holmboe ===
- 1927 - Robinson Grand Theater, 444 West Pike Street, Clarksburg, WV (remodel after fire)
- 1929 - Shepherdstown High School (Old), 54 Minden Ave, Shepherdstown, West Virginia
- 1937 - Circleville School, Price Way, Circleville, West Virginia
