= Thomas Commercial Historic District =

Historic district in West Virginia, United States

- U.S. National Register of Historic Places
- U.S. Historic district
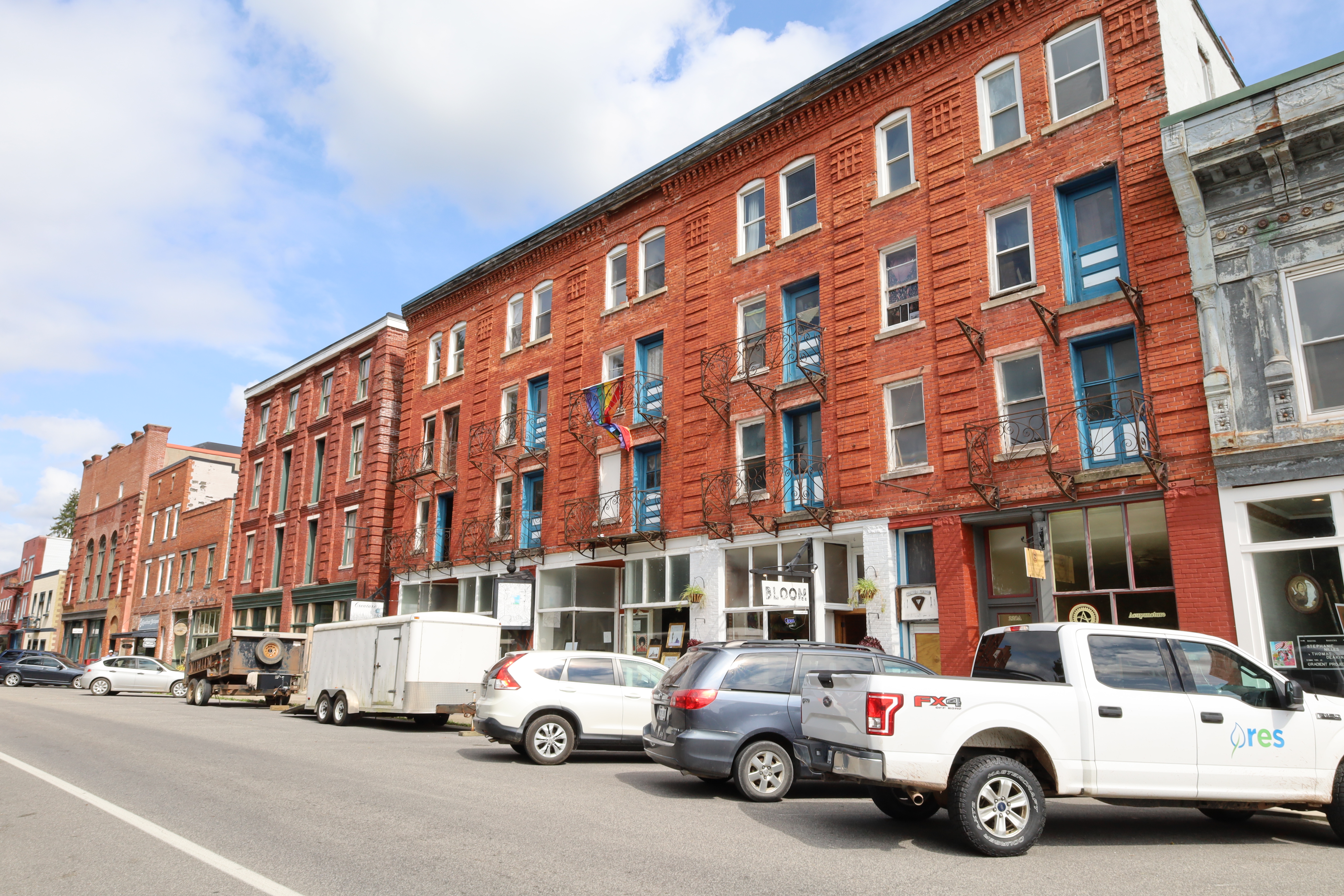
- Thomas City Hall, July 2006

- Location within West Virginia Location within the United States
- Location: Roughly Spruce St. and East Ave. bet. First St. and Third St.; East Ave. W to the North Fork of the Blackwater R., Thomas, West Virginia
- Coordinates: 39.1498°N 79.4985°W
- Area: 33 acres (13 ha)
- Built: 1884
- Architect: Holmboe & Lafferty
- Architectural style: Gothic Revival, Italianate, Renaissance
- NRHP reference No.: 98001072
- Added to NRHP: August 14, 1998

The Thomas Commercial Historic District is a national historic district located at Thomas, Tucker County, West Virginia. It encompasses 48 contributing buildings and two contributing structures. They include the business and commercial core of Thomas. Most of the buildings in the district date from the late-19th and early-20th century in popular architectural styles, such as Italianate, Renaissance Revival, and Gothic Revival. They are primarily two and three story masonry buildings with storefronts on the first floor and housing above. Notable buildings include the Frank Calobrese Building (1902), Duncan Funeral Home Building (1899), Miners and Merchant Bank (1902), City Hall (1927), and Thomas Central Power Plant Dam (1911). Also located in the district is the separately listed Cottrill Opera House (1902).

It was listed on the National Register of Historic Places in 1998.

== Gallery ==
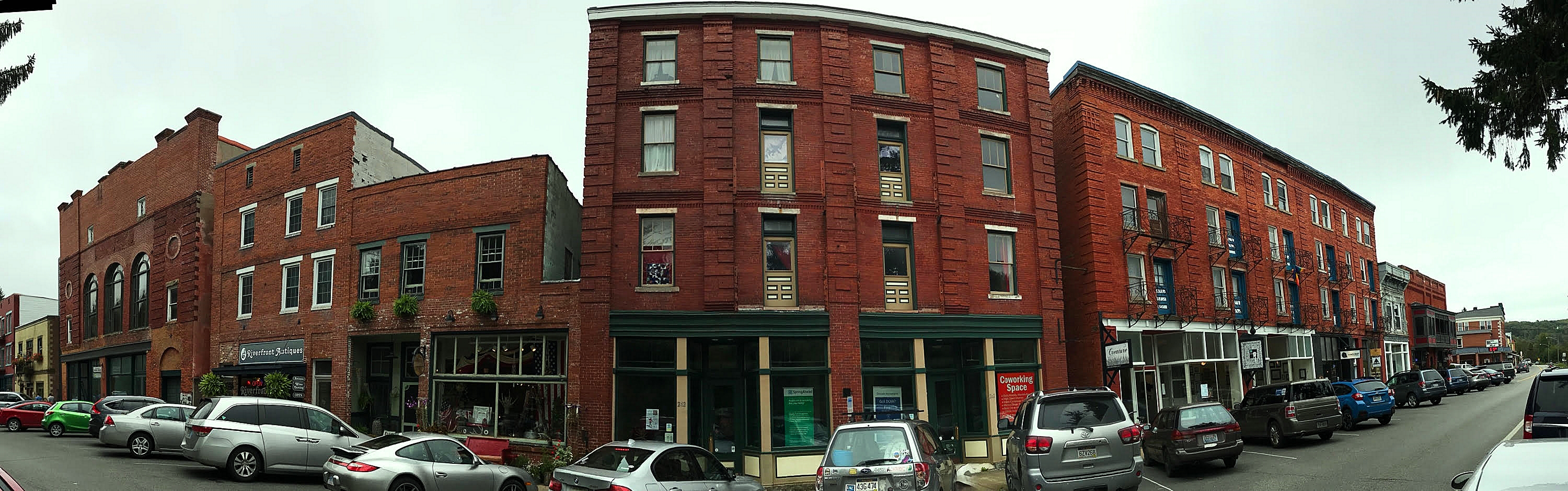
Panorama of Thomas West Virginia Historic District

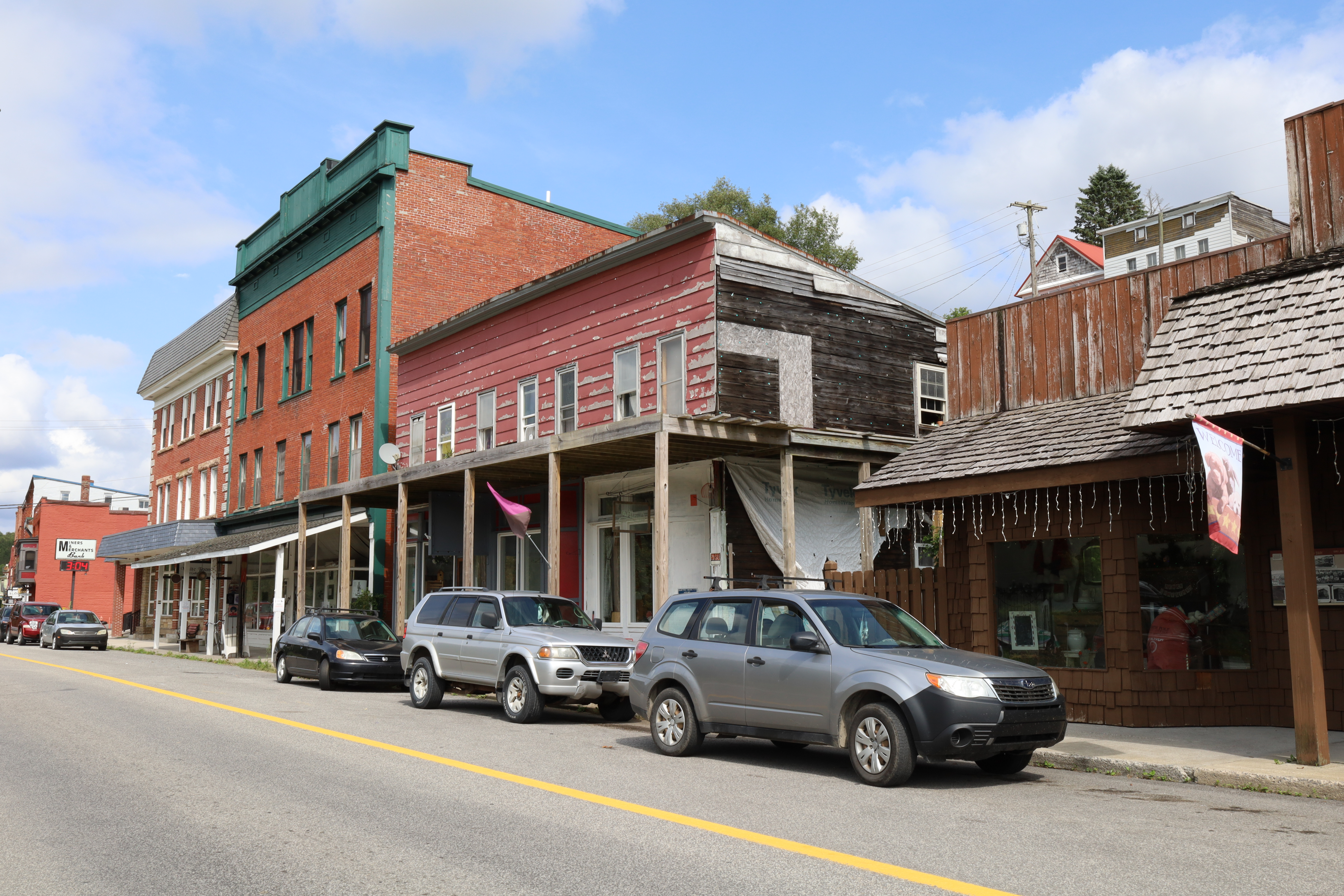
Buildings

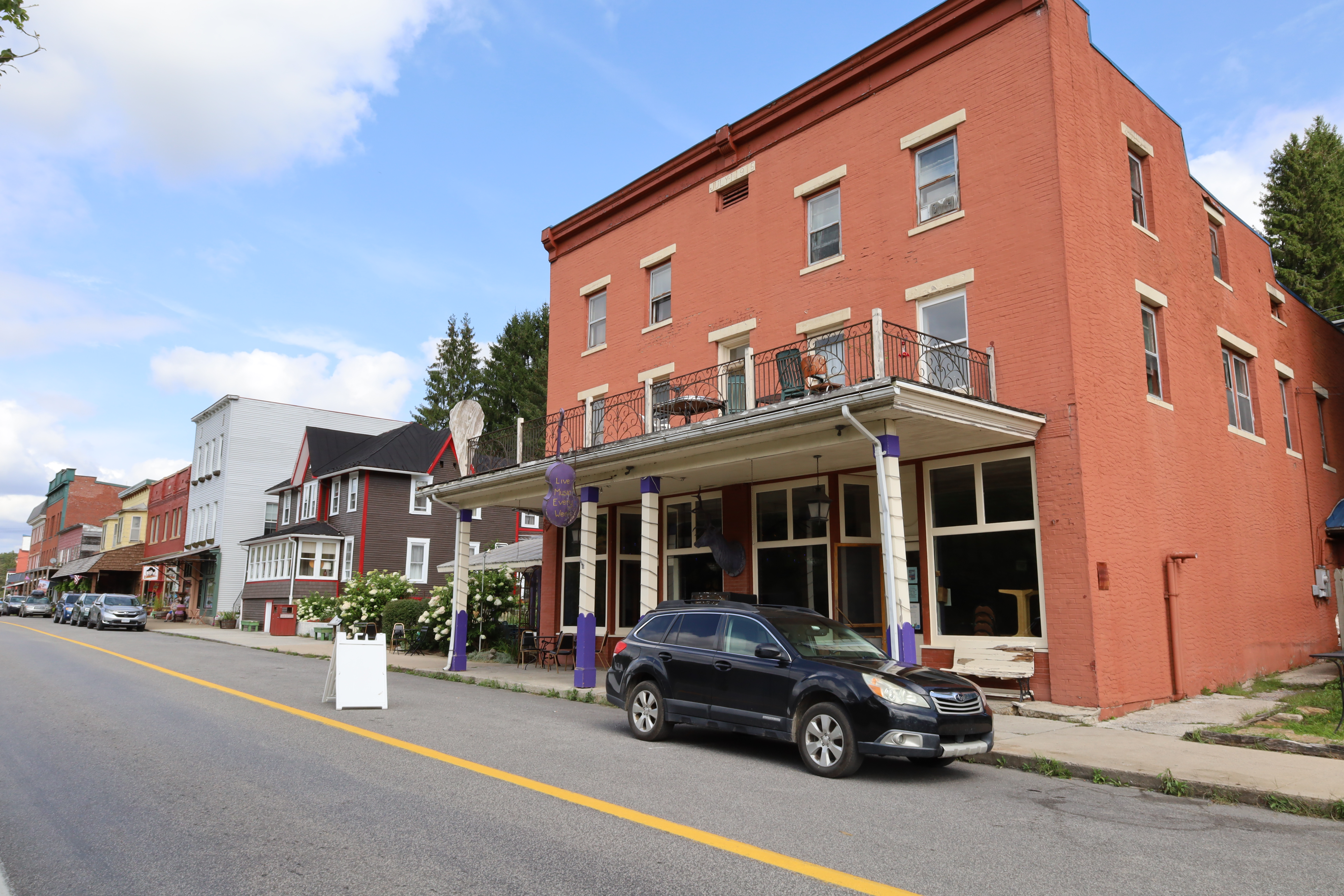
Buildings

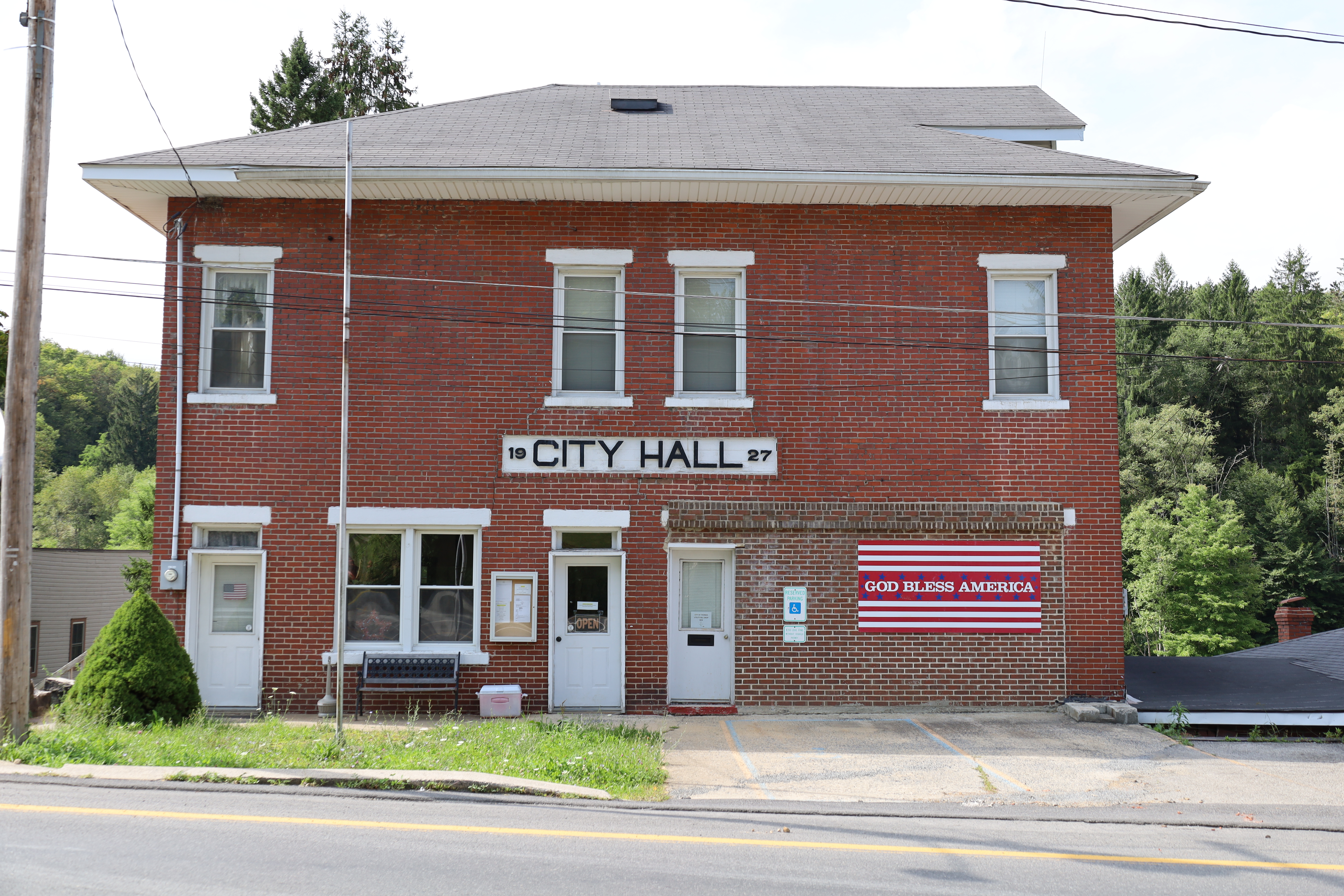
City Hall
