= Thomas Koon House =

Historic house in Maryland, United States

- U.S. National Register of Historic Places
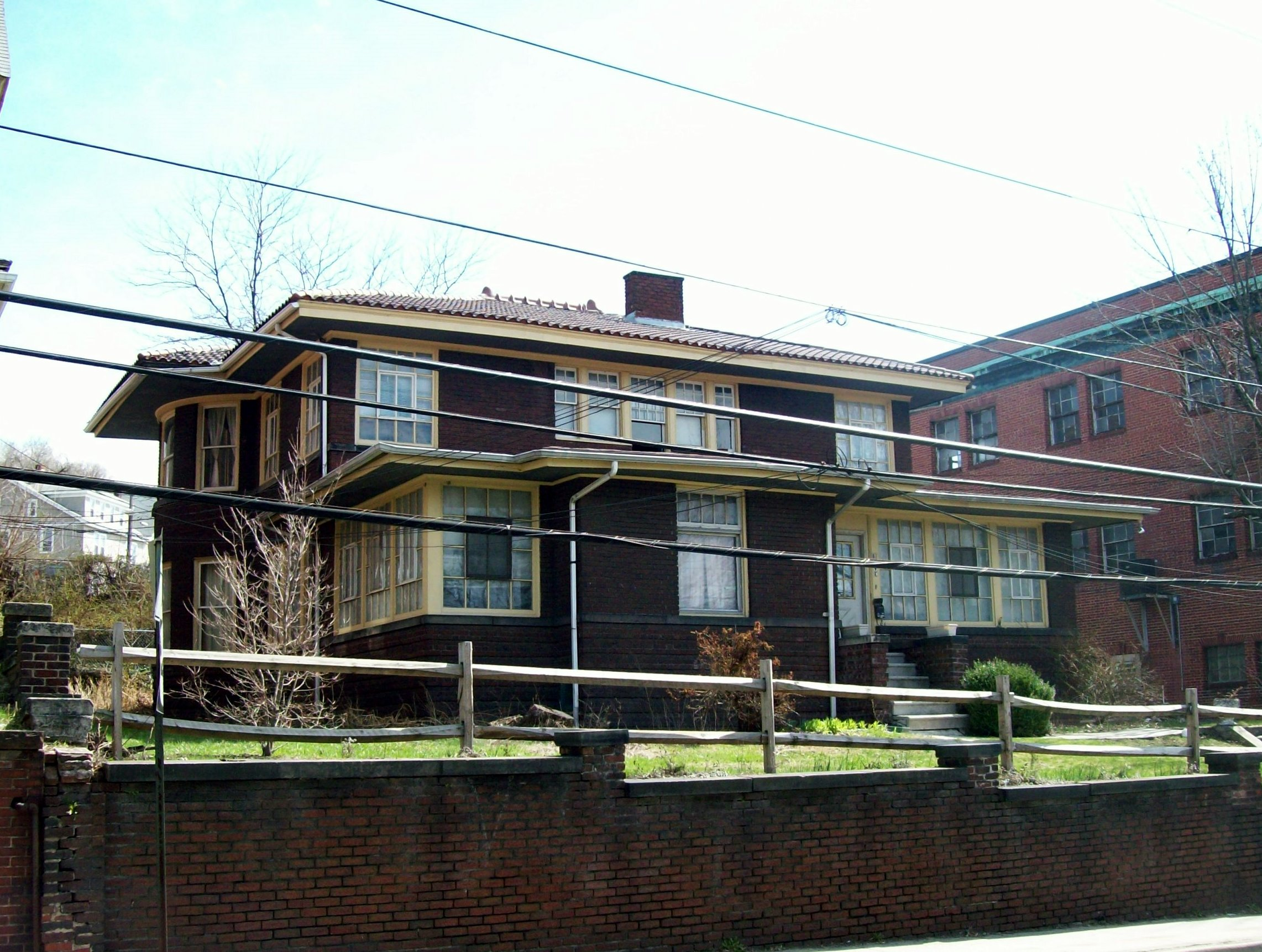
- Thomas Koon House, March 2011

- Location within Maryland Location within the United States
- Location: 221 Baltimore Ave., Cumberland, Maryland
- Coordinates: 39°39′10″N 78°45′29″W
- Area: less than one acre
- Built: 1912
- Architect: Holmboe & Lafferty
- Architectural style: Bungalow/craftsman
- NRHP reference No.: 82002805
- Added to NRHP: July 8, 1982

Thomas Koon House is a historic home in Cumberland, Allegany County, Maryland, United States. It is a brick Prairie-style house of large scale built in about 1912. It features arranged rectangular blocks with large expanses of window space, a terra cotta tiled hip roof and a small similarly influenced detached garage. The house was designed by Holmboe & Lafferty of Clarksburg for Doctor Thomas W. Koon, who arrived in Cumberland setting up an "active general practice" in May 1900.

The Thomas Koon House was listed on the National Register of Historic Places in 1982.
