= City Hall (Cumberland, Maryland) =

- U.S. National Register of Historic Places
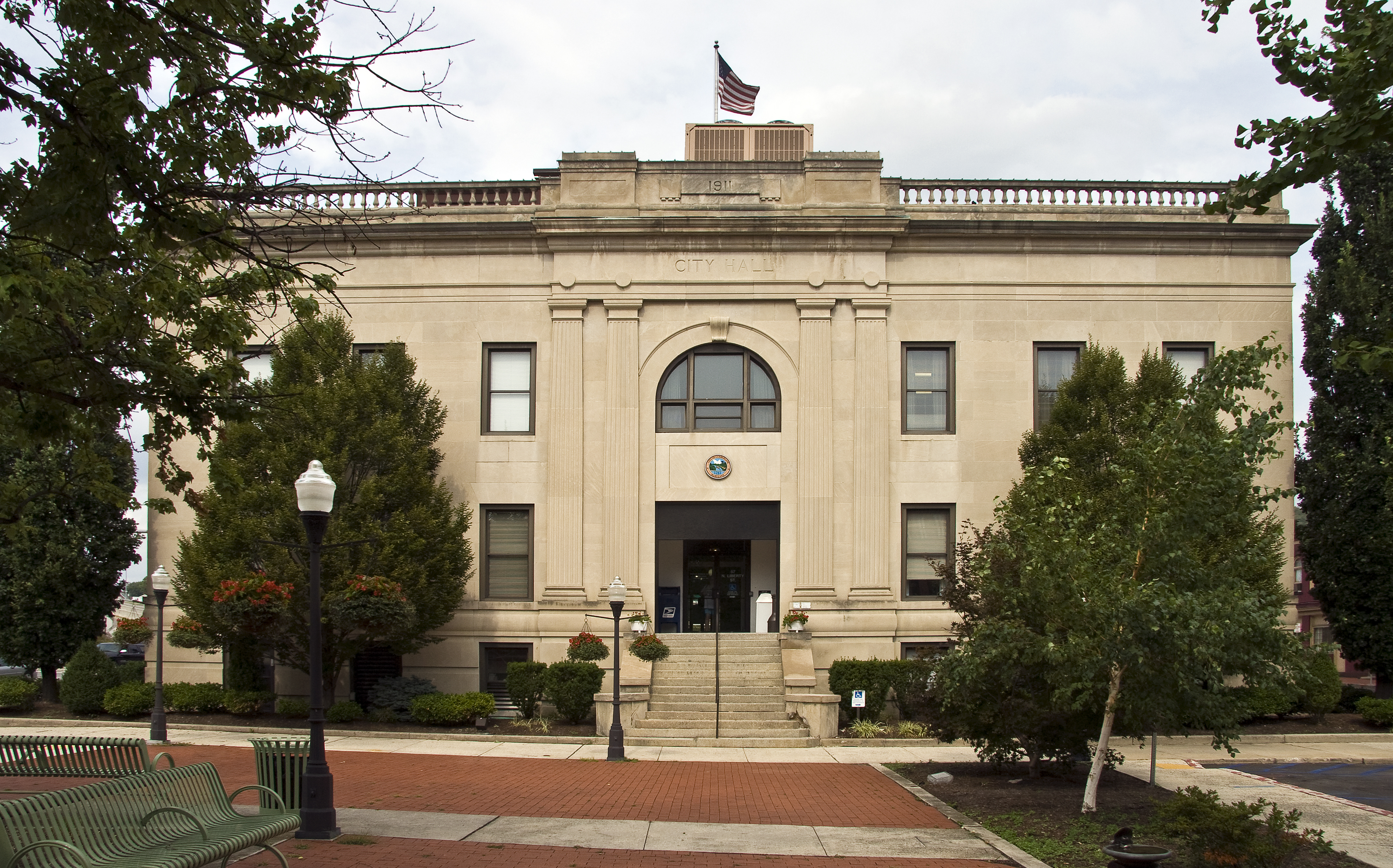
- Cumberland City Hall, August 2010

- Location within Maryland Location within the United States
- Location: N. Center St. between Frederick and Bedford Sts., Cumberland, Maryland
- Coordinates: 39°39′10.25″N 78°45′44.92″W
- Area: 1 acre (0.40 ha)
- Built: 1911
- Architect: Holmboe & Lafferty
- Architectural style: Neo-classical
- NRHP reference No.: 73000882
- Added to NRHP: February 27, 1973

Cumberland City Hall is a historic city hall in Cumberland, Allegany County, Maryland, United States. It was built between 1911 and 1912 and replaced the Cumberland, Maryland City Hall & Academy of Music. It is a 7-by-7-bay, two-story, stone-faced, neo-classical structure. It features an irregular corner, into which the architect has recessed a curving bay; the upper window in this curving bay has been filled with glass block. A mural by artist Gertrude du Brau on the interior of the rotunda dome depicts the early history of the city, including representations of General Edward Braddock and of George Washington.

The Cumberland City Hall was listed on the National Register of Historic Places in 1973.
