= Clarksburg Downtown Historic District =

Historic district in West Virginia, United States

- U.S. National Register of Historic Places
- U.S. Historic district
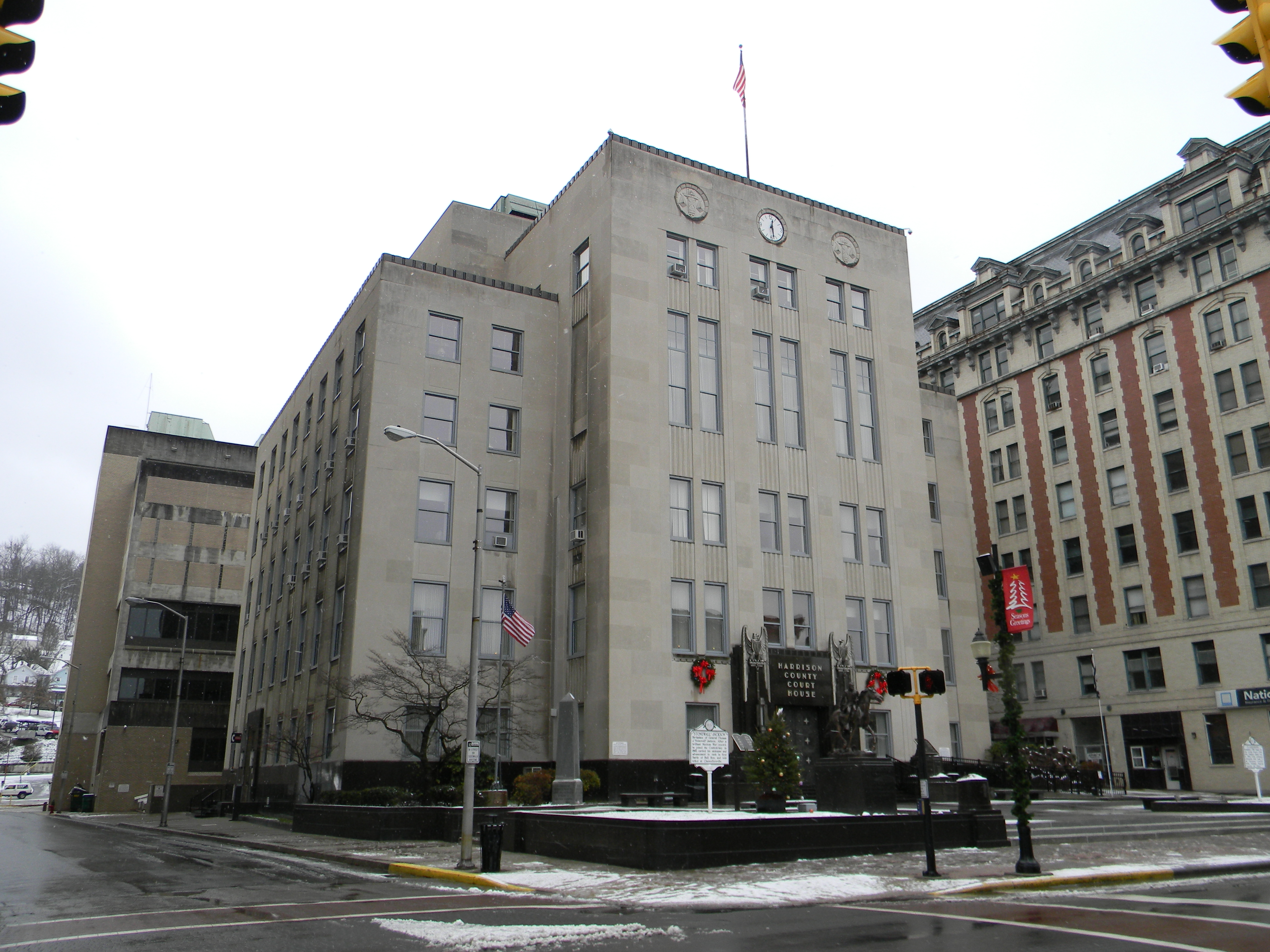
- Harrison County Courthouse, December 2012

- Location within West Virginia Location within the United States
- Location: Roughly bounded by Elk, Creek, 7th, and Main Sts., Clarksburg, West Virginia
- Coordinates: 39°16′47″N 80°20′22″W
- Area: 76 acres (31 ha)
- Built: 1800
- Architectural style: Renaissance, Italianate
- NRHP reference No.: 82004794
- Added to NRHP: April 12, 1982

Clarksburg Downtown Historic District is a national historic district located at Clarksburg, Harrison County, West Virginia. The district encompasses 119 contributing buildings in 16 blocks of the central business district of Clarksburg.

It was listed on the National Register of Historic Places in 1982. It includes an extraordinary variety of architectural types and styles including Renaissance Revival and Italianate.

== Contributing properties ==
- 1st Methodist Church (1909)
- 1st Presbyterian Church (1894)
- Colonial Building (1912), built by Virgil L. Highland
- County Courthouse (1932)
- Empire Bank (1907)
- Goff Building (1911)
- Nathan Goff Jr. House* (1883)
- Masonic Temple (1914)
- Merchant's Bank (1894)
- Post Office (1932)
- Robinson Grand (1930)
- Stealey–Goff–Vance House* (1807)
- Waldo Hotel (1904)
- Waldomore* (1839)

* Individually listed
