= Salem College Administration Building =

- U.S. National Register of Historic Places
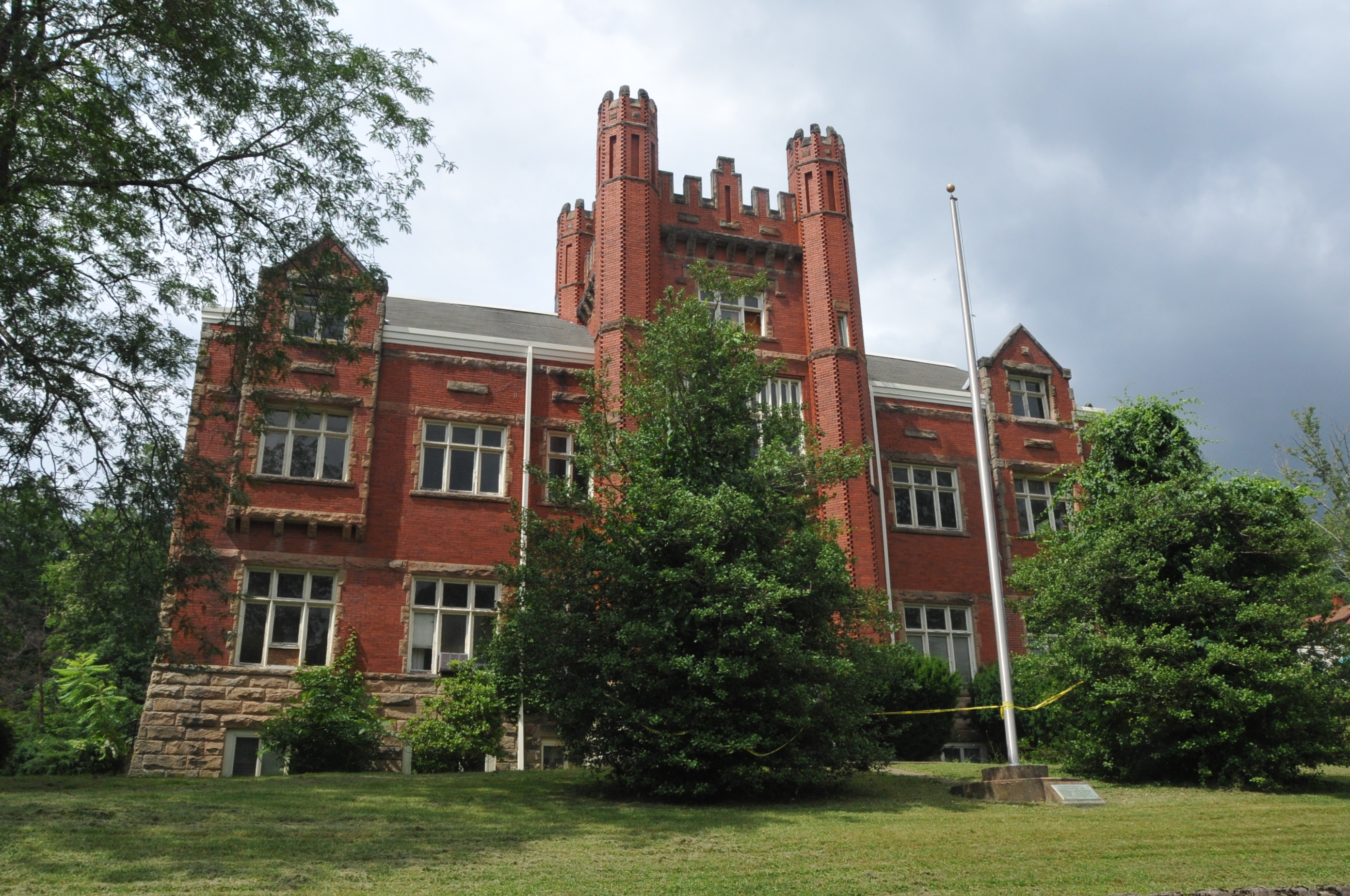
- The Salem College Administration Building at Salem College

- Location within West Virginia Location within the United States
- Location: 223 W. Main St., Salem, West Virginia, U.S.
- Coordinates: 39°17′1″N 80°34′2″W
- Area: 2.3 acres (0.93 ha)
- Built: 1909
- Built by: Short & Hartley
- Architect: Holmboe & Lafferty
- Architectural style: Late Gothic Revival
- Demolished: 2023
- NRHP reference No.: 89000184
- Added to NRHP: March 30, 1989

Salem College Administration Building was a historic school administration building located on the campus of Salem University in Salem, West Virginia, United States. It was designed by Ernest C. S. Holmboe of Holmboe & Lafferty, the most prominent architectural firm in the Clarksburg region at the time.

== Architecture ==
It was built in 1909–1910, and was a 2.5-story, stone and brick building with a truncated hipped roof and full basement in the Collegiate Gothic style. It consisted of an imposing central tower flanked by two symmetrical wings. The wings featured large, two-story, parapet-gabled wall dormers. The roof was topped by small, hipped roof cupola.

It was listed on the National Register of Historic Places in 1989.

== Demolition ==
The building was demolished in September 2023. Salem University announced plans to replace it with a park and alumni garden. The remainder of the space would be used for future development.
