= Pleasants County Courthouse =

- U.S. National Register of Historic Places
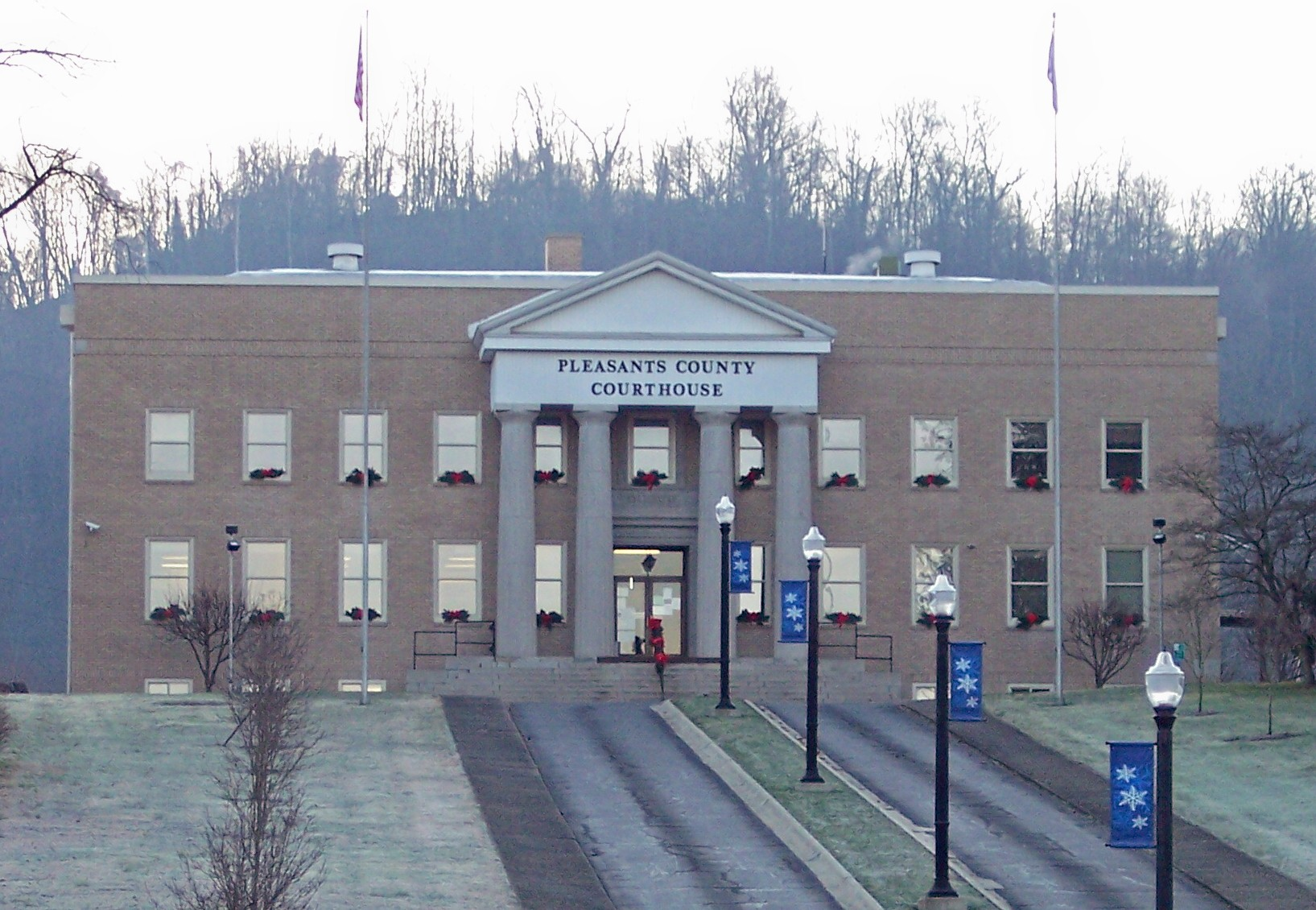

- Location within West Virginia Location within the United States
- Interactive map showing the location of Pleasants County Courthouse
- Location: St. Marys, West Virginia
- Coordinates: 39°23′19″N 81°12′17″W
- Built: 1924
- Built by: Putnam & Forman
- Architect: Holmboe & Pogue
- Architectural style: Classical Revival
- MPS: County Courthouses of West Virginia MPS
- NRHP reference No.: 04000917
- Added to NRHP: August 25, 2004

The Pleasants County Courthouse was built in 1924 in St. Marys, West Virginia. The Neo-Classical Revival style building replaced the original courthouse, which was badly damaged by lightning in 1923. The new courthouse was designed by architects Holmboe & Pogue of Clarksburg and built by Putnam & Foreman of Marietta, Ohio for $99,963. Ornamentation of the facade was omitted to save costs.
