= MTN Craft Film Festival =

Film Festival in Clarksburg, West Virginia, U.S.

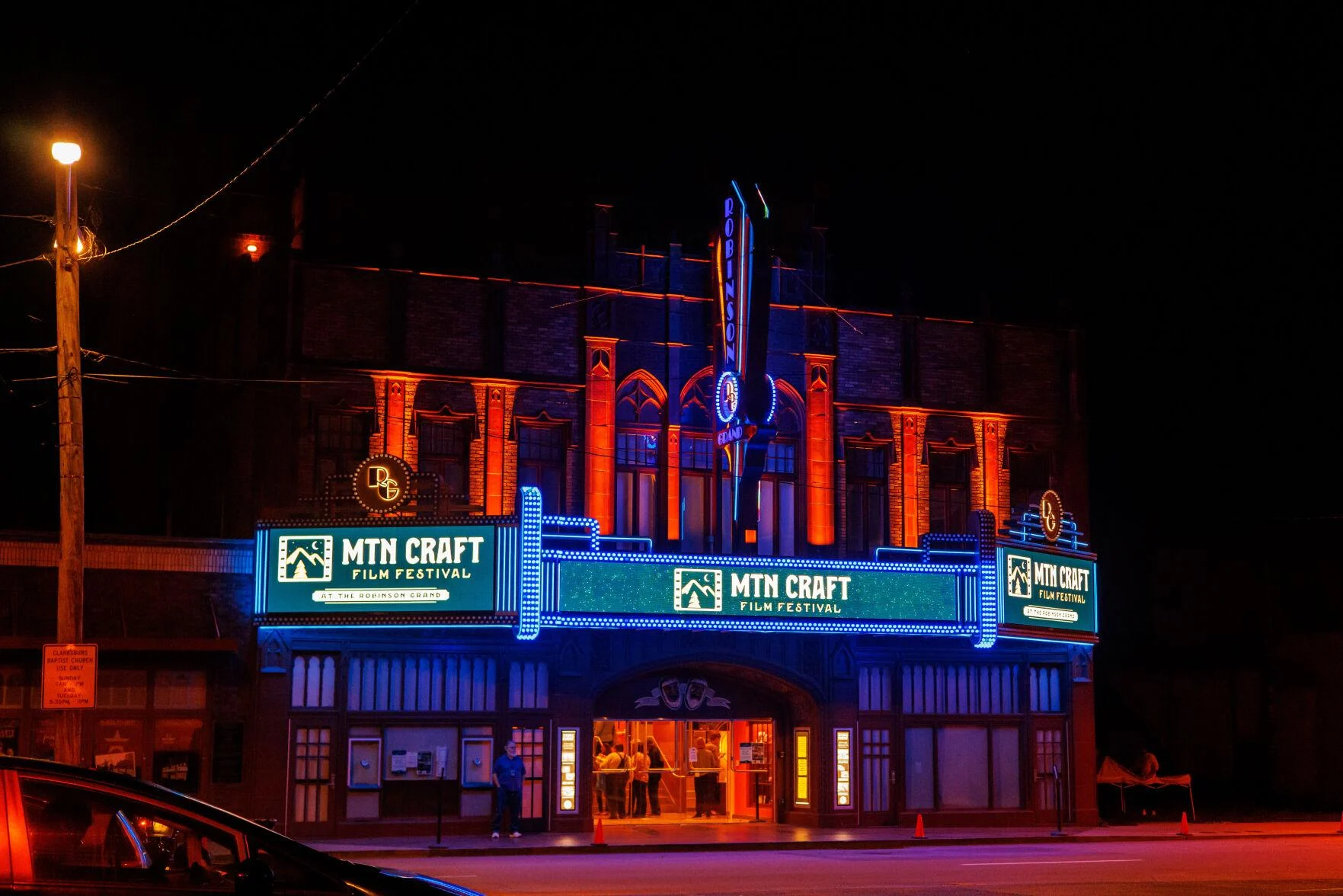
- Date: First weekend in October
- Venue: Robinson Grand Performing Arts Center
- Location: Clarksburg, West Virginia
- Type: Film Festival
- Cause: Appalachian Culture
- Website: Official website

The Mtn Craft Film Festival is an annual film festival established in 2023 and based in Clarksburg, West Virginia. The festival aims at promoting Appalachian culture and film, featuring long and short documentary and scripted narrative films created by Appalachians, about Appalachia, or featuring Appalachian locations/crew.

== Awards ==
The Mtn Craft Film Festival gives out a total of six awards, which include four judge-based, one audience-choice, and one Mtn Craft award;

=== Judges Choice Awards ===
- Best Documentary Short
- Best Scripted Short
- Best Experimental Short
- Best Student Short
- Audience Choice - Best Short Film
- Mtn Craft Award (Best of WV)

=== Audience Choice Awards ===
- Short Film

== Notable Films ==
- 2023 - King Coal, screened at the MTN Craft Film Festival
