= Whitescarver Hall =

- U.S. National Register of Historic Places
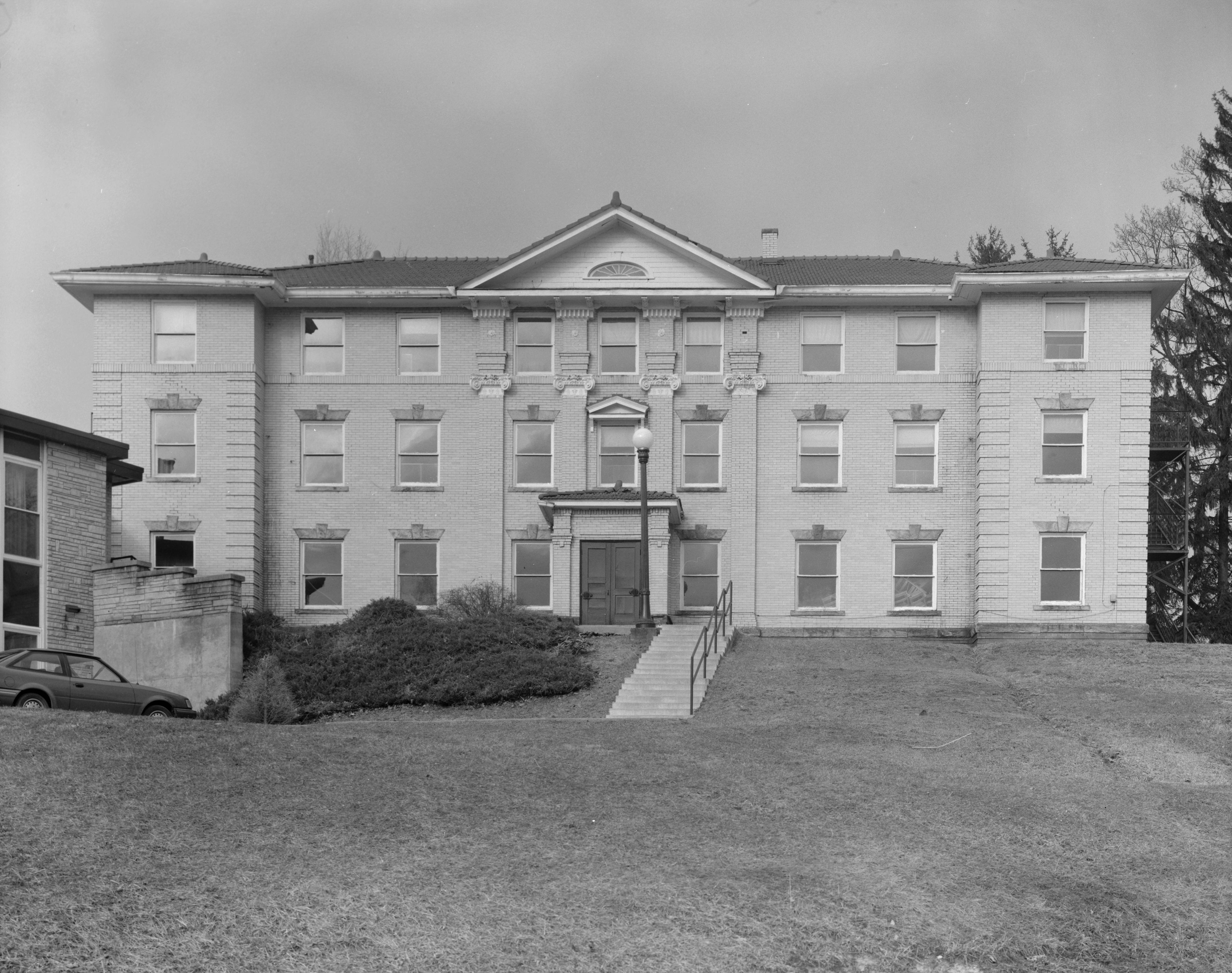
- Whitescarver Hall, between November 1989 and February 1990

- Location within West Virginia Location within the United States
- Location: Circle Dr. on the Alderson Broaddus University campus, Philippi, West Virginia
- Coordinates: 39°9′36″N 80°2′26″W
- Area: 2.5 acres (1.0 ha)
- Built: 1912
- Built by: S. T. H. Holt
- Architect: Holmboe & Lafferty
- Architectural style: Classical Revival
- NRHP reference No.: 89002317
- Added to NRHP: February 5, 1990

Whitescarver Hall is a historic dormitory building located on the campus of Alderson Broaddus University at Philippi, Barbour County, West Virginia, United States. It was built in 1911–1912, and is a three-story white brick building in the Neoclassical style. It measures 40 feet by 90 feet. It features a hipped roof covered in red tile and four classical pilaster topped with Ionic order capitals.

== Description ==
Whitescarver Hall is built of white pressed brick with carved limestone accents and details. The three-story building has a red tile hipped roof with deep overhangs. The front is accented by two-story Ionic pilasters, which corners are quoined.

== History ==
Whitescarver Hall was built as a boys' dormitory in 1912, named after Alderson Broaddus donor George M. Whiitescarver. It was designed by architects Holmboe and Lafferty of Clarksburg, West Virginia. It is the oldest building on the Alderson Broaddus campus. The building was the only male residence hall on campus from 1912 to the early 1950s, and continued in use as a residence hall until 1975, when it was converted to administrative use.

It was listed on the National Register of Historic Places in 1990.

== See also ==
- National Register of Historic Places listings at colleges and universities in the United States
