= Cumberland, Maryland City Hall & Academy of Music =

Civic theater in Cumberland, Maryland, US

Coordinates: 39°39′10.25″N 78°45′44.92″W

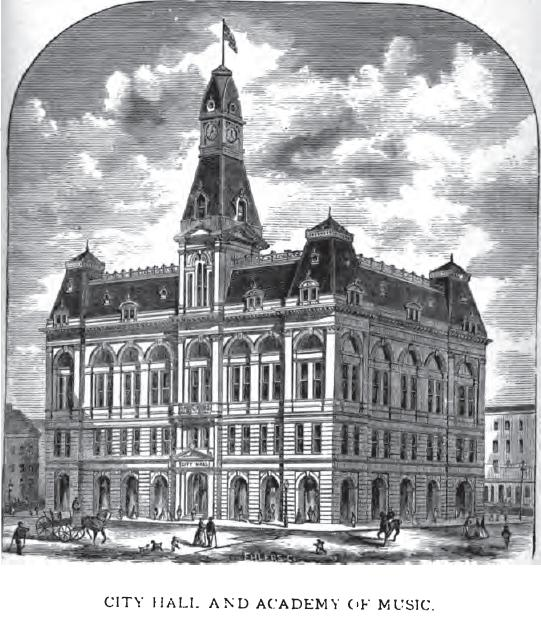

The Academy of Music (1874-1910) was a civic theater and the first city hall for the city of Cumberland, Allegany County, Maryland. It was a grand building with 18-inch (460 mm) thick walls, 78 feet (24 m) high from street to roof crest, and was 140 feet (43 m) high to the top of the tower. At the time, the building was built for a cost of $127,000 (approximately 2 million dollars in 2006 dollars). Construction began in 1874 and was finished in 1876.

The entire south portion of the building was devoted to entertainment and was referred to as the Academy of Music. The Academy of Music was opened Tuesday night, March 7, 1876 under the auspices of John T. Ford, when his company presented "The Big Bonanza." The academy featured a 30x30 foot stage, four VIP theater boxes, and a seating capacity of 1,300. At various times it was packed to the walls with over 2,000 people. The ground floor was occupied by a Market House, and above were located the beautiful frescoed mayor's office and council chamber.

In 1878, Lowermilk describes the interior of the Academy of Music as "one of the most beautiful interiors to be found in any place of amusement in the country." The ceiling work of art, upon which was expended the skill of the best painters in the employment of Emmart & Quarterly, of Baltimore. The lower floor of the Academy was divided into the "Orchestra," and "Orchestra Circle," and was supplied with nearly 500 patent folding chairs. The next floor was the "Dress Circle," and above this the "Balcony." The balconies were supported by handsome iron columns, and the fronts were of iron open ornamental work, in soft colors, picked with gold, and a vermilion background. The "Sunlight" reflector in the centre of the ceiling illumined the house, but was supplemented by handsome brackets on the wall. The drop curtain was a handsome painting, representing the "Decline of Carthage." On the apron border was a faithful portrait of Shakespeare, with suitable surroundings. Dressing rooms, with water, heat, and all conveniences occupy a portion of the space under the stage, and a door leads directly from the stage to a comfortable room for the "stars."

The Academy of Music was ultimately destroyed by fire on March 14, 1910. The remaining structure was razed and construction of a smaller replacement city hall was built during 1911-1912 at a cost of $87,000 (approximately 1.8 million dollars in 2006 dollars). The replacement city hall stands upon the site of the old City Hall and Academy of Music. Plans called for a dome on the new building, but at $6,000 it was considered too expensive. The circular foundation for the canceled dome is still visible on the roof. the interior rotunda features a mural by artist Gertude Dubrau depicting the city's early history, Fort Cumberland, General Edward Braddock, and George Washington.
