= Lantz Hall =

Historic building in Virginia, US

- U.S. National Register of Historic Places
- Virginia Landmarks Register
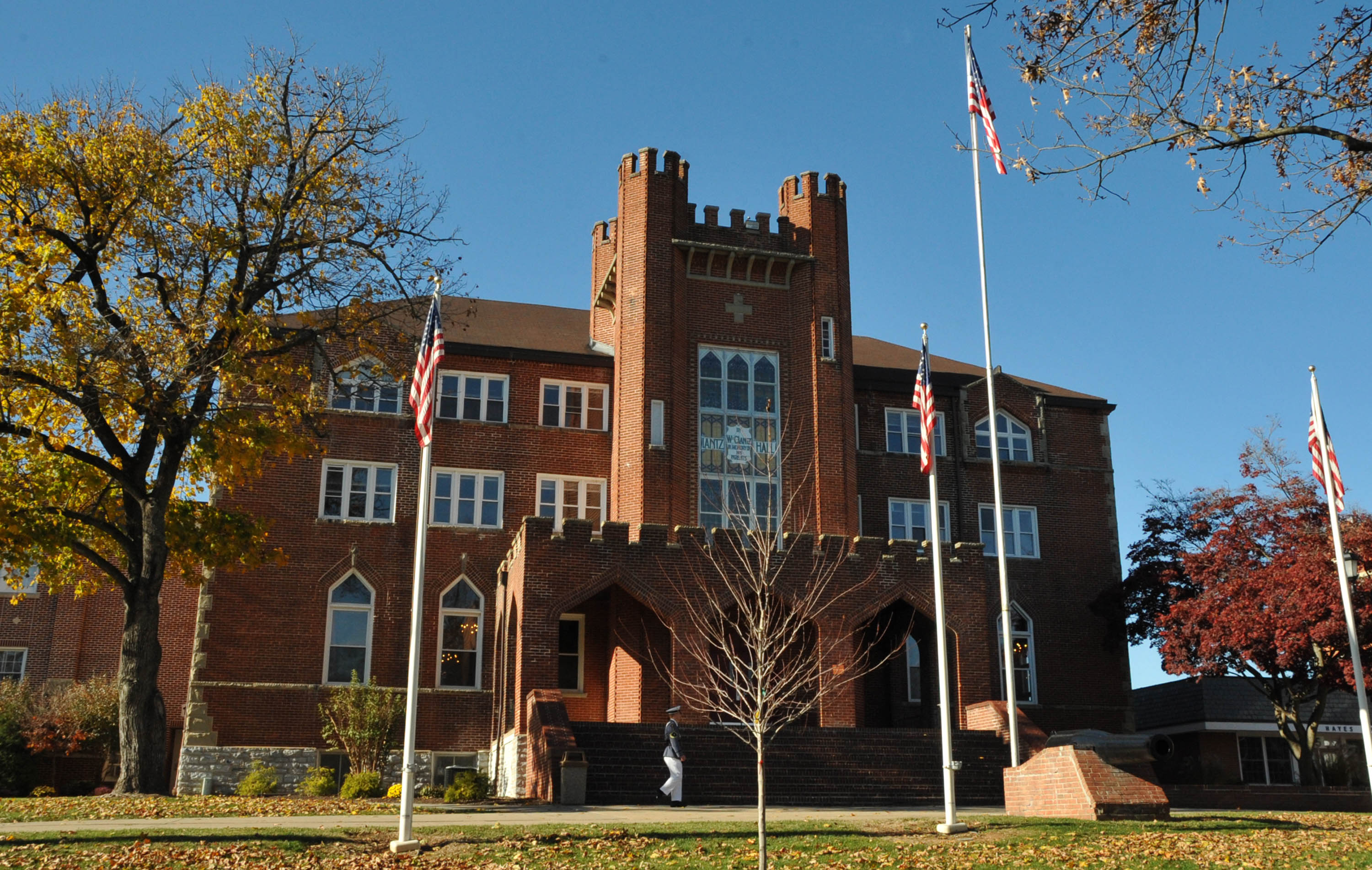

- Location within Virginia Location within the United States
- Location: 614 S. Main St. (US 11), Woodstock, Virginia
- Coordinates: 38°52′33″N 78°30′39″W
- Area: less than one acre
- Built: 1907-1909
- Architect: Holmboe & Lafferty
- Architectural style: Late Gothic Revival
- NRHP reference No.: 92001711
- VLR No.: 330-0005

Significant dates
- Added to NRHP: December 30, 1992
- Designated VLR: October 21, 1992

Lantz Hall is a historic building located at Massanutten Military Academy, Woodstock, Shenandoah County, Virginia. It was built in 1907–1909, and is a 3 1/2-story, seven bay by three bay, brick faced frame building in the Late Gothic Revival style. It features a projecting Gothic tower pavilion and three-bay pointed-arched porch. In 1926, a three-story, seven-by-three bay, gable-roofed ell was constructed to the rear. The building houses a dormitory, classrooms, a gymnasium/firing range, and an auditorium. It was the second building built on the Massanutten Military Academy campus.

It was listed on the National Register of Historic Places in 1992.
