= Morgan County Courthouse (West Virginia) =

Historic building

- U.S. National Register of Historic Places
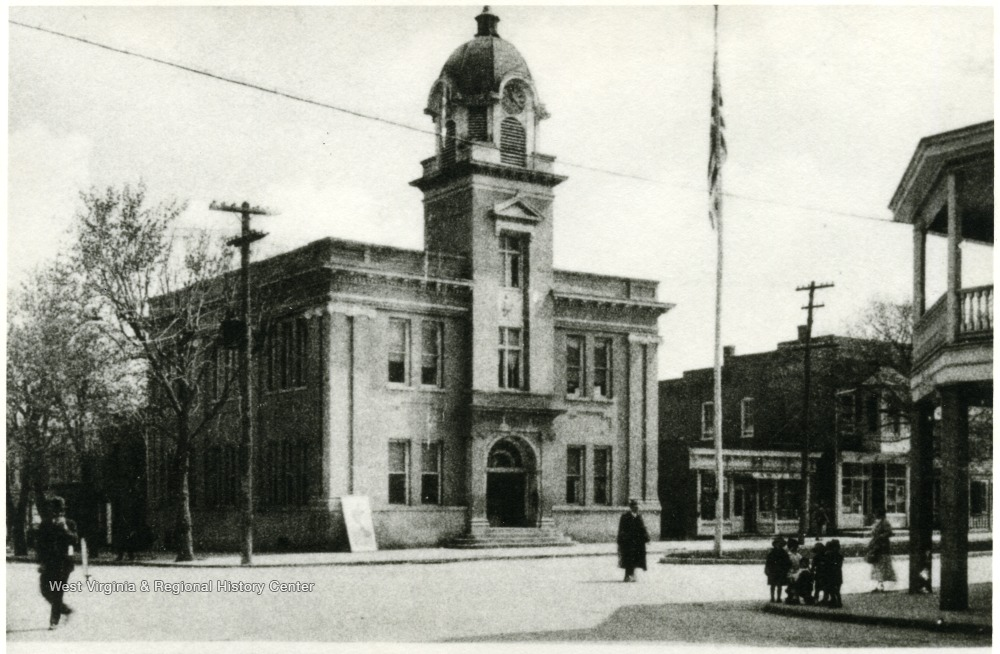
- View of courthouse looking Northeast

- Location within Eastern Panhandle of West Virginia Location within West Virginia Location within the United States
- Location: 202 Fairfax St., Berkeley Springs, West Virginia
- Coordinates: 39°37′44″N 78°13′39″W
- Area: less than one acre
- Built: 1907
- Built by: S. A. Westenhaver
- Architect: Holmboe & Lafferty
- Architectural style: Classical Revival
- MPS: County Courthouses of West Virginia MPS
- NRHP reference No.: 05001004
- Added to NRHP: September 7, 2005

Morgan County Courthouse was a historic courthouse building located at Berkeley Springs, Morgan County, West Virginia. It was built in 1907 and was a two-story, three-bay, building constructed of yellow brick with limestone accents in the Neoclassical style. It featured a centered, octagonal clock tower that extended above the second story flat roof and dominated the main elevation. Also on the property were an annex (c. 1920) and former jail (1939). The courthouse building was damaged by fire in 2006 and was subsequently demolished.

It was listed on the National Register of Historic Places in 2005.
