= Robinson Grand Performing Arts Center =

Historic theater and performing arts center in Clarksburg, West Virginia

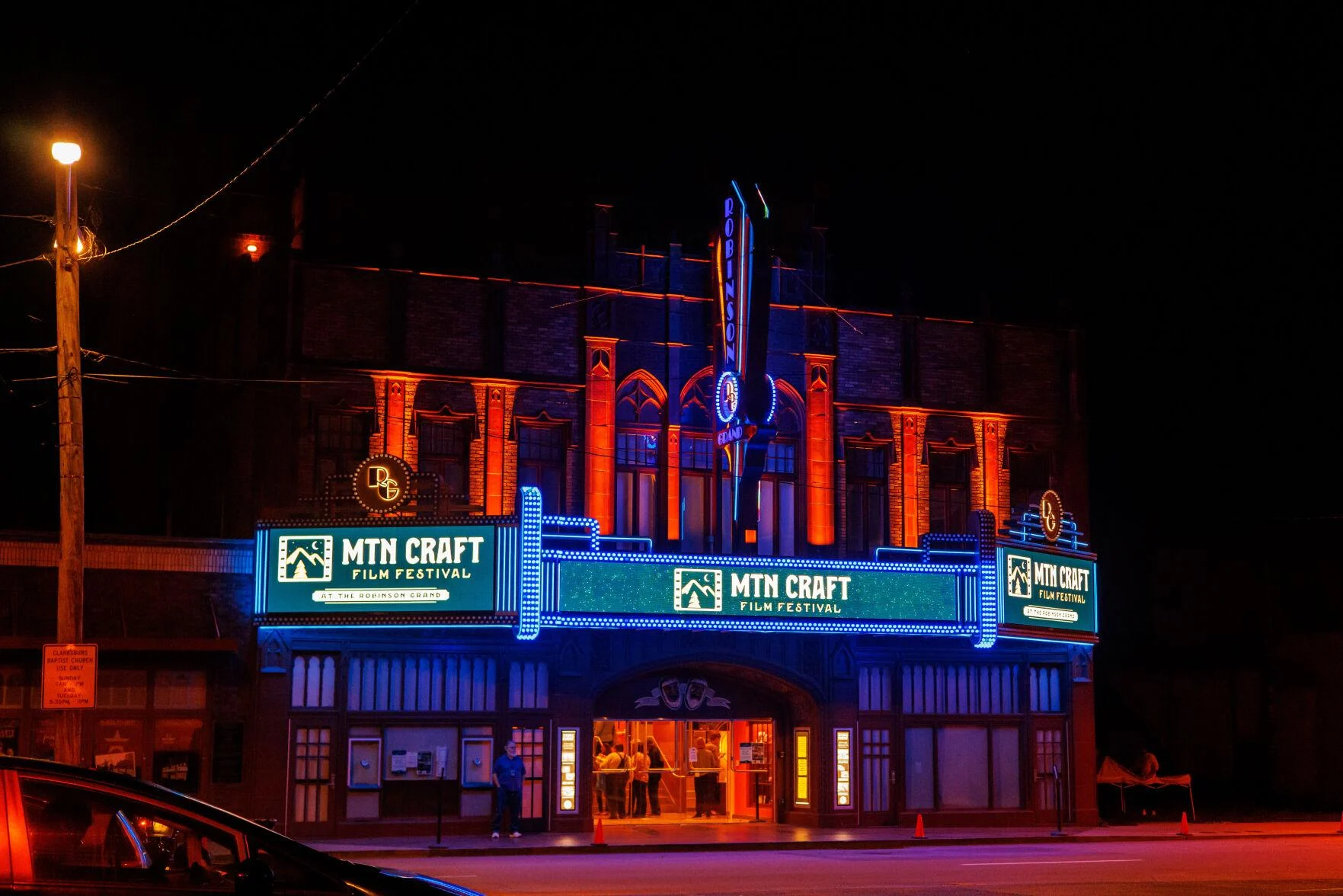
- Robinson Grand Theater
- Interactive map of Robinson Grand Performing Arts Center
- Former names: Robinson Grand Theater; Keith Grand; Rose Garden Theater
- Location: 444 West Pike Street; Clarksburg, West Virginia, United States
- Capacity: 1,000
- Type: Performing arts center

Construction
- Built: 1912
- Opened: February 7, 1913
- Renovated: 1927, 1939, 1984, 2018
- Expanded: 1927

Website
- therobinsongrand.com
- Robinson Grand
- U.S. Historic district – Contributing property
- Architect: Holmboe & Lafferty (1913); Ernest C. S. Holmboe (1927); Edward J. Wood (1939)
- Architectural style: Neo-Gothic, Streamline Moderne
- Part of: Clarksburg Downtown Historic District (ID82004794)

The Robinson Grand Performing Arts Center is a historic theater in Clarksburg, West Virginia, which serves as a performing arts and education center.

The theater has been used for film screenings, stage productions, wedding receptions, and events such as the Miss West Virginia Pageant. In its current configuration, the Robinson Grand Performing Arts Center seats approximately 1000 patrons.

== Founding and opening ==
The Clarksburg Amusement Company was formed in 1912 by Robert Lafferty, president; Claude Robinson, vice president; Charles Alexander, secretary-treasurer; and Reuben "Rube" Robinson, manager. Claude and Reuben Robinson, brothers from Louisville, Kentucky, had both worked in the theater business. Claude later managed theaters in New Orleans and New York, while Reuben was managing the Grand Opera House in Clarksburg by 1907. After the Grand Opera House was destroyed by fire around 1910, Reuben persuaded Claude to invest in a new theater in Clarksburg.

The Robinson Grand opened on February 7, 1913, with a performance of The Case of Becky starring Frances Starr.

== History ==
The Robinson Grand was part of the Keith-Albee vaudeville circuit and hosted performers including Jack Benny and ventriloquist Edgar Bergen.

In 1927, the theater was significantly enlarged and remodeled. Claude Robinson's friendship with Albert Warner of Warner Bros. gave the theater early access to sound-film technology, and it became one of the first theaters in the United States to show talking pictures.

On May 31, 1939, a fire broke out on the roof of the theater. According to the theater's history, the fire was believed to have started when an air-conditioning repairman's torch ignited the structure, with drought conditions contributing to its spread. Most of the stage and auditorium were destroyed, while the front portion of the building and its façade remained largely intact. The theater reopened on December 24, 1939. The 1927 façade was retained, while a new auditorium and stage in the Streamline Moderne style were designed by Clarksburg architect Edward J. Wood.

James LaRosa purchased the theater in 1984, remodeled the interior, and renamed it the Rose Garden Theater. Attendance continued to decline, and the theater closed in 2004.

The city of Clarksburg acquired the building in 2014 and began planning for its reuse. A public-private partnership involving the city, the Cultural Foundation of Harrison County, and other regional participants undertook its rehabilitation as a performing arts center. Work began in January 2017.

The Robinson Grand Performing Arts Center officially reopened on October 20, 2018. The grand opening included performances by comedian Jay Leno, the Guess Who, and the Alley Cats.

Claude Robinson remained associated with the theater for decades and died in 1948. Madge Stout Douds, who began working at the Robinson Grand in the 1920s, later served as its manager through the 1970s.

== Architecture ==
The Robinson Grand incorporates elements from several periods of construction. The original theater was built in 1912–1913, substantially enlarged in 1927, partly rebuilt after a 1939 fire, and rehabilitated as a performing arts center between 2017 and 2018.

=== Original theater and 1927 expansion ===
The original theater was designed by Robert Lafferty and Ernest C. S. Holmboe. The building stood approximately 72 feet back from West Pike Street, with a covered walkway leading from the street to the entrance. Its stage measured approximately 60 by 36 feet and was designed large enough to accommodate a later expansion of the auditorium.

Holmboe designed a major expansion in 1927. The building was extended to the street, filling the lot, and seating capacity increased from approximately 1,000 to 1,500. The new façade was designed in the Neo-Gothic style, with three Gothic-arched windows above the marquee, terra-cotta pilasters and finials, and a Tudor-arched entrance. A large marquee advertised the theater as the "Keith Grand" and promoted vaudeville and motion pictures.

The 1927 auditorium was designed as an atmospheric theater. Interior decorators J. H. Wickstead and William G. Schulte of Louisville, Kentucky, used an English garden theme with murals depicting stone walls, trees, flowers, hillsides, and castles. The mezzanine included an "Old English" lounge.

=== 1939 reconstruction ===
The fire of May 1939 destroyed most of the auditorium and stage but left much of the 1927 front portion and façade intact. The façade was retained during reconstruction, while architect Edward J. Wood designed a new auditorium and stage in the Streamline Moderne style.

The rebuilt auditorium used curved wall surfaces and vertical architectural elements around the proscenium. The mezzanine overlooked the lobby, which included a large circular chandelier, while recessed uplighting was used throughout the auditorium and other public spaces.

=== 2017–2018 rehabilitation ===
The rehabilitation undertaken after the city's acquisition of the building restored the exterior and repaired the historic windows. The project preserved and repaired features including the lobby chandeliers, terrazzo floors, water fountains, grand staircases, coved plaster ceilings, proscenium, decorative glass displays, and portions of the original flooring. A new marquee with LED lighting and a video display was installed.

The project also made the building accessible under the Americans with Disabilities Act and added two additions containing expanded restrooms, concession facilities, and green rooms and dressing rooms connected to the stage. The basement received new drainage and an orchestra green room, while the second floor was adapted as an educational center.

== Rehabilitation cost and funding ==
The 2017–2018 rehabilitation had a total project cost of $23,715,605. Funding included sales-tax revenue bonds, private contributions, federal and state historic tax credits, New Markets Tax Credit financing, developer equity, and city funds.

The National Park Service reported the project's funding sources as:

- USDA Sales Tax Revenue Refunding Bonds – $8,507,921
- Capital campaign and local donors – $1,069,268
- Federal Historic Tax Credit – $2,322,733
- West Virginia Historic Tax Credit – $1,128,810
- New Markets Tax Credits – $5,039,064
- Developer equity – $1,116,479
- City stabilization fund – $4,531,330

Clarksburg enacted a 1% sales and use tax in 2015, effective July 1, 2016. The city identified the Robinson Grand renovation as one of the projects to be supported by the additional revenue. Sales-tax revenue was later used for debt service on bonds financing the theater project.

== See also ==
- MTN Craft Film Festival
