= Nathan Goff Jr. House =

- Formerly listed on the U.S. National Register of Historic Places
- Location within West Virginia Location within the United States
- Location: 463 W. Main St., Clarksburg, West Virginia
- Coordinates: 39°16′47.7″N 80°20′31.6″W
- Area: 1 acre (0.40 ha)
- Built: 1880–1883
- Architect: Sloan & Balderston
- Architectural style: Queen Anne, Second Empire
- Demolished: 1993
- Part of: Clarksburg Downtown Historic District (ID82004794)
- NRHP reference No.: 76001936

Significant dates
- Added to NRHP: December 12, 1976
- Removed from NRHP: February 18, 1994

Nathan Goff Jr. House was a historic home located at Clarksburg, Harrison County, West Virginia. It was built between 1880 and 1883, and was a three-story brick dwelling in a combined Queen Anne/Second Empire style. It featured a slate-covered mansard roof. It was the home of Nathan Goff Jr. (1843–1920) and his son Guy D. Goff (1866–1933), who both served as United States senators from West Virginia.

It was listed on the National Register of Historic Places in 1976 and recognized as a contributing building to the Clarksburg Downtown Historic District in 1982. It was delisted in 1994, after demolition in 1993.
