= Circleville School =

- U.S. National Register of Historic Places
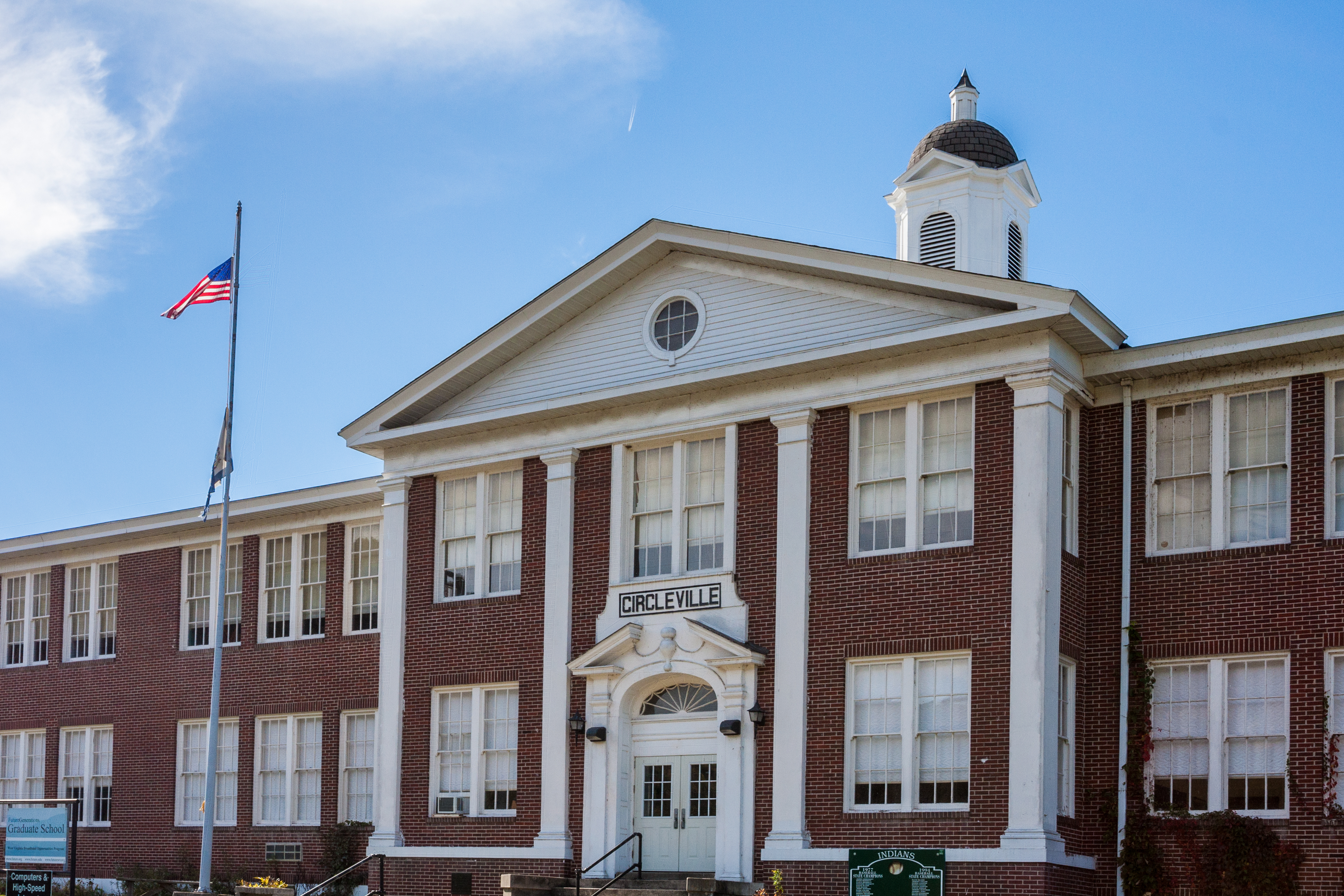

- Location within West Virginia Location within the United States
- Location: WV 28, Circleville, West Virginia
- Coordinates: 38°40′22″N 79°29′11″W
- Area: 6.5 acres (2.6 ha)
- Built: 1937-1938
- Architect: Ernest C. S. Holmboe
- Architectural style: Colonial Revival, Other, Georgian Revival
- NRHP reference No.: 95001323
- Added to NRHP: November 9, 1995

Circleville School is a historic school building located at Circleville, Pendleton County, West Virginia. It was designed by architect Ernest C. S. Holmboe and built in 1937–1938, as a project of the federal Works Progress Administration (WPA). The two-story masonry building is in the Georgian Revival style. It was built on the foundation of a previous school destroyed by fire. The front facade features a two-story pedimented projecting pavilion emphasized by large Doric order pilasters. It is constructed of hollow tile block with a red brick veneer. The truncated hipped roof is topped by a wooden cupola.

Construction of the school was authorized by Franklin Delano Roosevelt in May 1937, making it one of the last buildings, if not the last building, constructed through the WPA. It was listed on the National Register of Historic Places in 1995.

Today the school functions as a community center. It houses a commercial kitchen, workout center, and a few small businesses. It is also used for community events such as square dances and Chamber of Commerce dinners.
