= Massanutten Military Academy =

- The Massanutten Military Academy Shield

Location
- 614 S. Main Street; Woodstock, Virginia 22664–1205; United States; 38°52′33″N 78°30′39″W

Information
- Type: Coeducational, Independent college preparatory boarding military school
- Motto: Non Nobis Solum ("Not for Ourselves Alone")
- Established: 1899
- Head of School: Kim Elshafie-Layman
- Commandant of Cadets: LTC Lester Layman, USA (Retired)
- Grades: 8−12, postgraduate
- Colors: Purple & gold
- Mascot: Colonels
- Nickname: Colonels
- Accreditation: VAIS, SACS, NAIS
- Newspaper: Massanutten Matters
- Yearbook: Adjutant
- Website: www.militaryschool.com

Massanutten Military Academy (MMA) is a coeducational military school for grades 8 through 12 and one academic postgraduate year, located in Woodstock, Virginia, United States.

== History ==
=== 19th century ===
Massanutten Military Academy, named for the nearby mountain, was established by the Virginia Classis of the Reformed Church in 1899. The school opened on September 12, 1899, with 40 students, half of whom were boarders.

=== 20th century ===
From the beginning the school was coed, with the first graduating class in 1902 consisting of three boys and three girls. In 1905, the first of two significant events in the history of the school occurred: Howard J. Benchoff was appointed the school president. He stayed in that position for nearly five decades, to be succeeded for the next decade and a half by his son. Lantz Hall, the second structure on the academy grounds, was begun in 1907 and dedicated in 1909, to accommodate a growing student population.

During the early years of his stewardship Benchoff established several policies. The first was expanding the school size to include number of students, staff, buildings, and acreage. The second, as a result of an otherwise undocumented "incident", was limiting the boarding department to boys beginning in 1910. The last policy, and the second significant event in the school's early history, was adopting a military program. While the program was not implemented until 1917, early in his tenure Benchoff described the goal of a military program as "to train the boys with a discipline that is valuable and give them that easy and graceful carriage which is an accomplishment in any gentleman's claim to culture".

In 1930, after receiving an application and inspecting the existing program, the U.S. War Department formally made the school a JROTC unit "placing it on a par with the highest rated military schools in the country".

=== 21st century ===
The school has a strong academic program with the graduating class of 2017, which consisted of 24 students, earning more than $2 million in scholarships alone. The school also has a strong STEM Program that focuses on experiential learning.

Academy presidents, headmasters, and superintendents
1899–1903: J. Silor Garrison; 1903–1905: Robert Raymond Jones; 1905–1952: Howard J. Benchoff; 1952–1955: Robert J. Benchoff^{†}; 1955–1968: Robert J. Benchoff; 1968–1969: Gordon Bowman Sr.^{†}	1969–1974: Lloyd D. Graham; 1974–1975: Gordon Bowman II^{†}; 1975–1991: W. Crawford Moon; 1991–1993: Robert L. Oesterling; 1993–1994: Robert Rossi; 1994–2001: Jack Albert	2001–2008: Col. Roy F. Zinser; 2008–2009: Thomas N. Connors^{†}; 2009–2012: Craig Jones; 2012–2014: Merle Henkel; 2014–2018: Dr David Skipper; 2018–present: Kim Elshafie-Layman
^{†} This symbol indicates an acting or interim head of the school.

== Administration ==
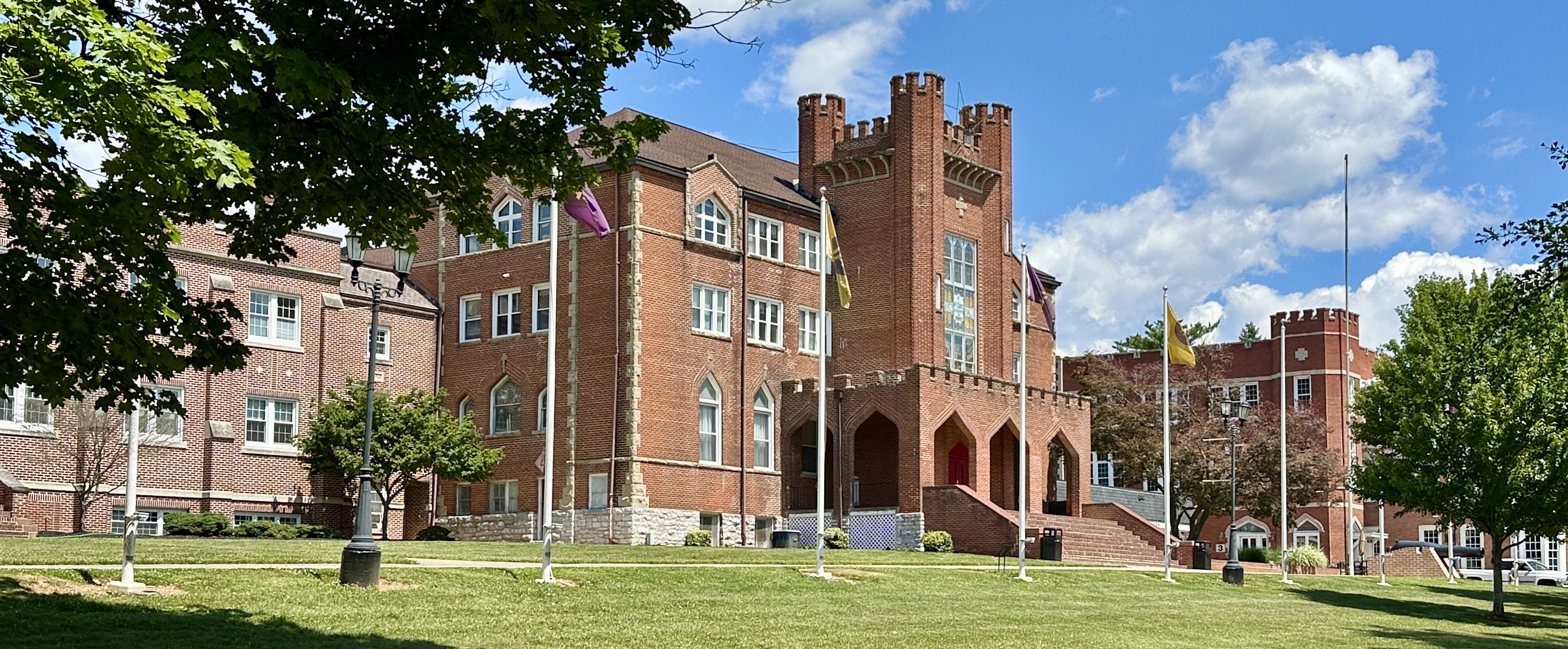
Massanutten Military Academy in 2026 with Lantz Hall in the center

Kim Elshafie is the current head of school. She is the former dean of academics as well. The Commandant of Cadets is Lieutenant Colonel Lester Layman, U.S. Army (Ret.). The average enrollment is around 125 students. MMA is fully accredited by the Virginia Association of Independent Schools (VAIS) and the Southern Association of Colleges and Schools (SACS).

== Honor code ==
As part of its mission the academy has a Cadet Honor Code patterned after the one at West Point. "A cadet will not lie, cheat, or steal, nor tolerate those who do." The Cadet Honor Council consists of juniors and seniors selected by the senior class and the faculty, as approved by the head of school. When a suspected honor code violation is reported, the Honor Council faculty advisers convene the council for a hearing at which the cadets involved are required to explain their conduct. The Honor Council recommends punishment and/or other measures appropriate to educate the Cadet Corps about the expectations of honorable behavior. Final approval lies with the head of school. Continued, repeated violations of the Honor Code may warrant dismissal from the academy.

== JROTC program ==
MMA JROTC shoulder insignias

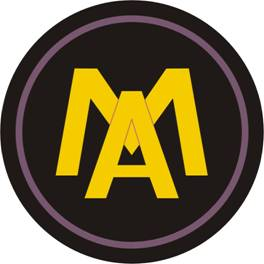
MMA shoulder sleeve insignia

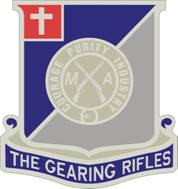
MMA shoulder loop insignia worn by the Gearing Rifles drill team

MMA's Army Junior Reserve Officers' Training Corps (JROTC) is consistently recognized as an Honor Unit with Distinction. Since 2011, MMA Cadets have qualified to compete in the JROTC Leadership and Academic Bowl (JLAB). Six times they have qualified for Level Two of the competition and three times they have qualified to compete at the national level. For the 2017 competition, MMA is placed in the top 24 programs in the nation and the #1 team in the 4th Brigade of Cadet Command.

== Notable alumni ==
- Rasir Bolton (graduated in 2017, attended Massanutten for a post-grad year in 2017–18), professional basketball player
- Jack Ham (1968), former professional football player for the Pittsburgh Steelers and member of the College Football Hall of Fame and Pro Football Hall of Fame
- Mia Khalifa, former pornographic film actor
- Tyrese Martin (2018), professional basketball player
- Frank Mason III (2013), professional basketball player
- Jamorko Pickett (2017), professional basketball player
- Alfred C. Richmond, 11th Commandant of the Coast Guard
- Dereon Seabron (2019), professional basketball player

== See also ==
- List of United States military schools and academies
