= Circleville, West Virginia =

Unincorporated community in West Virginia, United States

Circleville
- Unincorporated community
- Location within the state of West Virginia Circleville (the United States)
- Coordinates: 38°40′15″N 79°29′28″W
- Country: United States
- State: West Virginia
- County: Pendleton
- Elevation: 2,057 ft (627 m)
- Time zone: UTC-5 (Eastern (EST))
  - Summer (DST): UTC-4 (EDT)
- ZIP code: 26804
- GNIS feature ID: 1554138

Circleville is an unincorporated community located in Pendleton County, West Virginia, United States. Circleville was originally named Zirkleville after John Zirkle, who ran a dry goods store in the town. The old Circleville School is listed on the National Register of Historic Places.

Circleville is located on West Virginia Route 28 along the North Fork of South Branch of the Potomac River at its confluence with Pike Gap and Bouses Runs.

== In literature ==
In his 2001 book At Home in the Heart of Appalachia, John O'Brien refers to Circleville as a "lonely outpost in the ice-cold mountains."
