= Cottrill's Opera House =

- Cottrill’s Opera House
- U.S. National Register of Historic Places
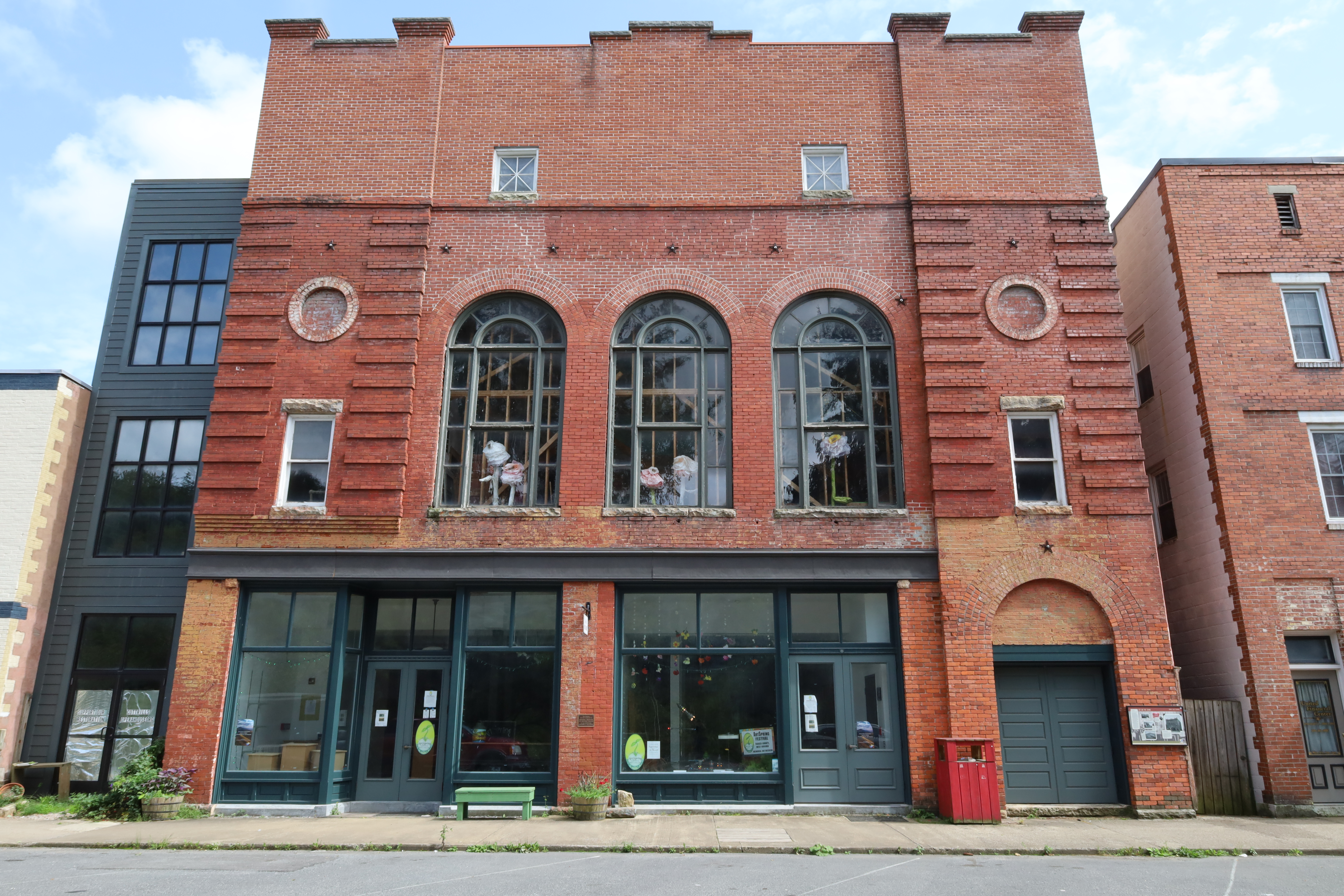
- The Opera House in 2020

- Location within West Virginia Location within the United States
- Location: East Ave., Thomas, West Virginia
- Coordinates: 39°9′1″N 79°29′53″W
- Area: 0.3 acres (0.12 ha)
- Built: 1902
- Architect: Holmboe & Lafferty
- NRHP reference No.: 79002602
- Added to NRHP: August 29, 1979

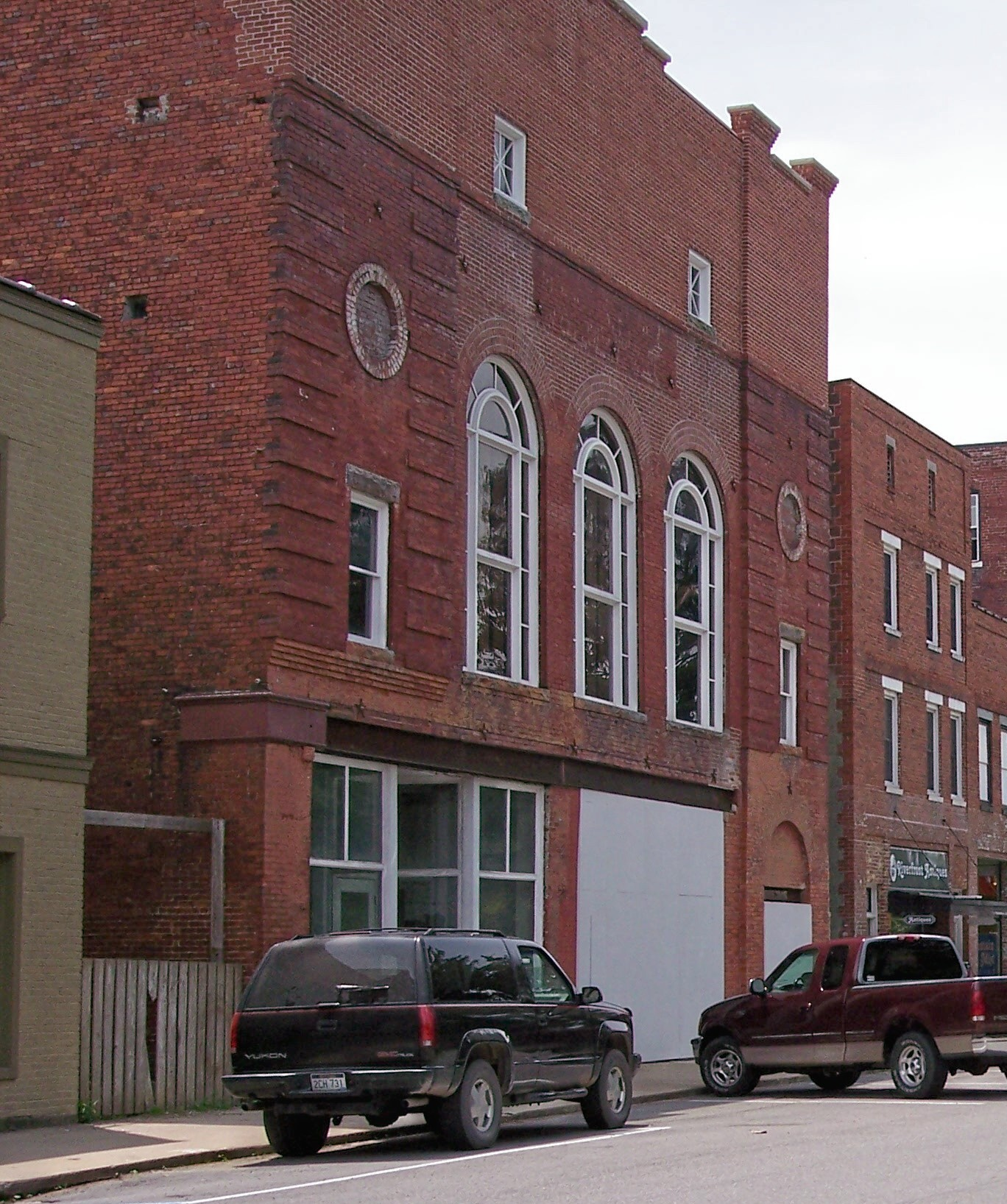
Cottrill Opera House, July 2006

Cottrill's Opera House, known since 1915 as Sutton's Opera House or Sutton Theater, is a historic vaudeville and movie theater building in Thomas, Tucker County, West Virginia.

It was built in 1902 and is a rectangular brick building with a high front that appears to be four stories tall. The interior is dominated by a large auditorium with balcony seating. The building is now being used as two different retail locations.

It was listed on the National Register of Historic Places in 1979.
