= List of bridges on the National Register of Historic Places in West Virginia =

This is a list of bridges and tunnels on the National Register of Historic Places in the U.S. state of West Virginia.

Name	Image	Built	Listed	Location	County	Type
Alderson Bridge	Alderson Bridge	1914	1991-12-04	Alderson; 37°43′29″N 80°38′36″W	Greenbrier, Monroe	Concrete arch bridge
B & O Railroad Potomac River Crossing		1894, 1931	1978-02-14	Harpers Ferry, West Virginia; 39°19′27″N 77°43′43″W	Jefferson	
B & O Railroad Viaduct		1871	1976-06-22	Benwood; 40°00′42.4″N 80°44′20.6″W	Marshall	
Barrackville Covered Bridge	Barrackville Covered Bridge	1853	1973-03-30	Barrackville; 39°30′21″N 80°10′5″W	Marion	Covered Burr truss
Bridgeport Lamp Chimney Company Bowstring Concrete Arch Bridge	Bridgeport Lamp Chimney Company Bowstring Concrete Arch Bridge	1924	1997-01-27	Bridgeport; 39°17′3″N 80°15′22″W	Harrison	Concrete Arch Bridge
Burnsville Bridge	Burnsville Bridge	1893	1995-03-17	Burnsville; 38°51′19″N 80°39′25″W	Braxton	Pratt-Through Truss
The Capon Bridge	The Capon Bridge	1933	2026-01-09	Capon Bridge; 39°17′52.2″N 78°26′05.7″W	Hampshire	Parker through truss
Capon Lake Whipple Truss Bridge	Capon Lake Whipple Truss Bridge	1874, 1938	2011-12-11	Capon Lake; 39°9′28″N 78°32′13″W	Hampshire	formerly South Branch Bridge
Carrollton Covered Bridge	Carrollton Covered Bridge	1856	1981-06-04	Carrollton; 39°5′24″N 80°5′12″W	Barbour	Covered Burr Arch
Center Point Covered Bridge	Center Point Covered Bridge	ca. 1889	1983-08-29	Center Point; 39°23′22″N 80°38′4″W	Doddridge	Covered bridge
Dents Run Covered Bridge	Dents Run Covered Bridge	1889	1981-06-04	Laurel Point; 39°37′26″N 80°2′24″W	Monongalia	Covered Kingpost Truss
Duck Run Cable Suspension Bridge	Duck Run Suspension Bridge	1922	1997-07-09	Trubada; 38°55′38″N 80°47′28″W	Gilmer	cable suspension bridge
Elm Grove Stone Arch Bridge	m Grove Stone Arch Bridge	1817	1981-08-21	Wheeling; 40°2′37″N 80°39′32″W	Ohio	Stone Arch
Fish Creek Covered Bridge	Fish Creek Covered Bridge	ca. 1881	1981-06-04	Hundred; 39°40′20″N 80°27′9″W	Wetzel	Covered King Post truss
Fletcher Covered Bridge		1891	1981-06-04	Maken; 39°18′20″N 80°28′49″W	Harrison	Covered Kingpost Truss
Glenville Truss Bridge	Glenville Truss Bridge	1885	1998-12-04	Glenville; 38°55′58″N 80°50′20″W	Gilmer	Pratt Through Truss
Great Cacapon Bridge	Great Cacapon Bridge	1937	2025-09-08	Great Cacapon; 39°37′06.0″N 78°16′58.8″W	Morgan	Parker Through Truss
Herns Mill Covered Bridge		1884	1981-06-04	Lewisburg; 37°49′57″N 80°30′18″W	Greenbrier	Covered Queen Post Truss
High Level Bridge		1921	1991-12-04	Fairmont; 39°28′57″N 80°8′27″W	Marion	
Hokes Mill Covered Bridge	Hokes Mill Covered Bridge	ca. 1899	1981-06-04	Lewisburg; 37°41′50″N 80°31′30″W	Greenbrier	Covered Long Truss
Indian Creek Covered Bridge	Indian Creek Covered Bridge	ca. 1898	1975-04-01	Salt Sulphur Springs; 37°32′50″N 80°34′22″W	Monroe	Covered Howe truss
Largent Bridge	Largent Bridge	1915	2025-09-08	Largent; 39°28′51.7″N 78°23′04.1″W	Morgan	Concrete Arch, Three arches
Laurel Creek Covered Bridge	Laurel Creek Covered Bridge	1910, 1911	1981-06-04	Lillydale; 37°33′40″N 80°37′36″W	Monroe	Covered
Locust Creek Covered Bridge	Locust Creek Covered Bridge	1870	1981-06-04	Hillsboro; 38°4′46″N 80°15′1″W	Pocahontas	Covered Warren Truss
Market Street Bridge		1905	2019-03-21	Follansbee; 40°21′28.0″N 80°36′29.0″W	Brooke	Suspension
Mud River Covered Bridge	Mud River Covered Bridge	ca. 1875	1975-06-10	Milton; 38°25′51″N 82°8′22″W	Cabell	Covered Modified Howe truss
New River Gorge Bridge	New River Gorge Bridge	1977	2013-08-14	near Fayetteville	Fayette	Steel arch
Parks's Gap Bridge		1892	1994-11-04	Martinsburg; 39°30′45″N 78°2′11″W	Berkeley	Modified Howe Truss
Philippi Covered Bridge		1852	1972-09-14	Philippi; 39°9′11″N 80°2′37″W	Barbour	Covered
Rotary Park Bridge		1929, 1930	2002-12-12	Huntington; 38°25′7″N 82°23′39″W	Cabell	Rustic
Sarvis Fork Covered Bridge	Sarvis Fork Covered Bridge	1889, 1890	1981-06-04	Sandyville; 38°55′17″N 81°38′41″W	Jackson	Covered Long Truss
Simpson Creek Covered Bridge	Simpson Creek Covered Bridge	1881	1981-06-04	Bridgeport; 39°18′31″N 80°16′47″W	Harrison	Covered Multiple Kingpost
Sixth Street Railroad Bridge	Sixth Street Railroad Bridge	1869, 1871, 1914	1982-12-10	Parkersburg; 39°16′2″N 81°33′32″W	Wood	
South Side Bridge part of the Downtown Charleston Historic District	South Side Bridge	1936	2006-03-24	Charleston; 38°20′48.6″N 81°38′13.2″W	Kanawha	
Staats Mill Covered Bridge	Staats Mill Covered Bridge	1887	1979-05-29	Staats Mill; 38°44′34″N 81°37′34″W	Jackson	Covered Long truss
Stouts Mill Bridge	Stouts Mill Bridge	1897	1998-12-04	Stouts Mill; 38°53′47″N 80°43′54″W	Gilmer	camel-back through truss
Van Metre Ford Stone Bridge	Van Metre Ford Stone Bridge	1832	1977-08-22	Martinsburg; 39°26′42″N 77°55′40″W	Berkeley	Stone Arch
Walkersville Covered Bridge	Walkersville Covered Bridge	1903	1981-06-04	Walkersville; 38°51′30″N 80°27′39″W	Lewis	Covered Queenpost Truss
Wheeling Suspension Bridge		1849	1970-01-26	Wheeling; 40°4′13″N 80°43′38″W	Ohio	Suspension;Howe truss
Winfield Toll Bridge		1955	2011-12-15	Winfield; 38°32′4″N 81°53′53″W	Putnam	
