= List of covered bridges in West Virginia =

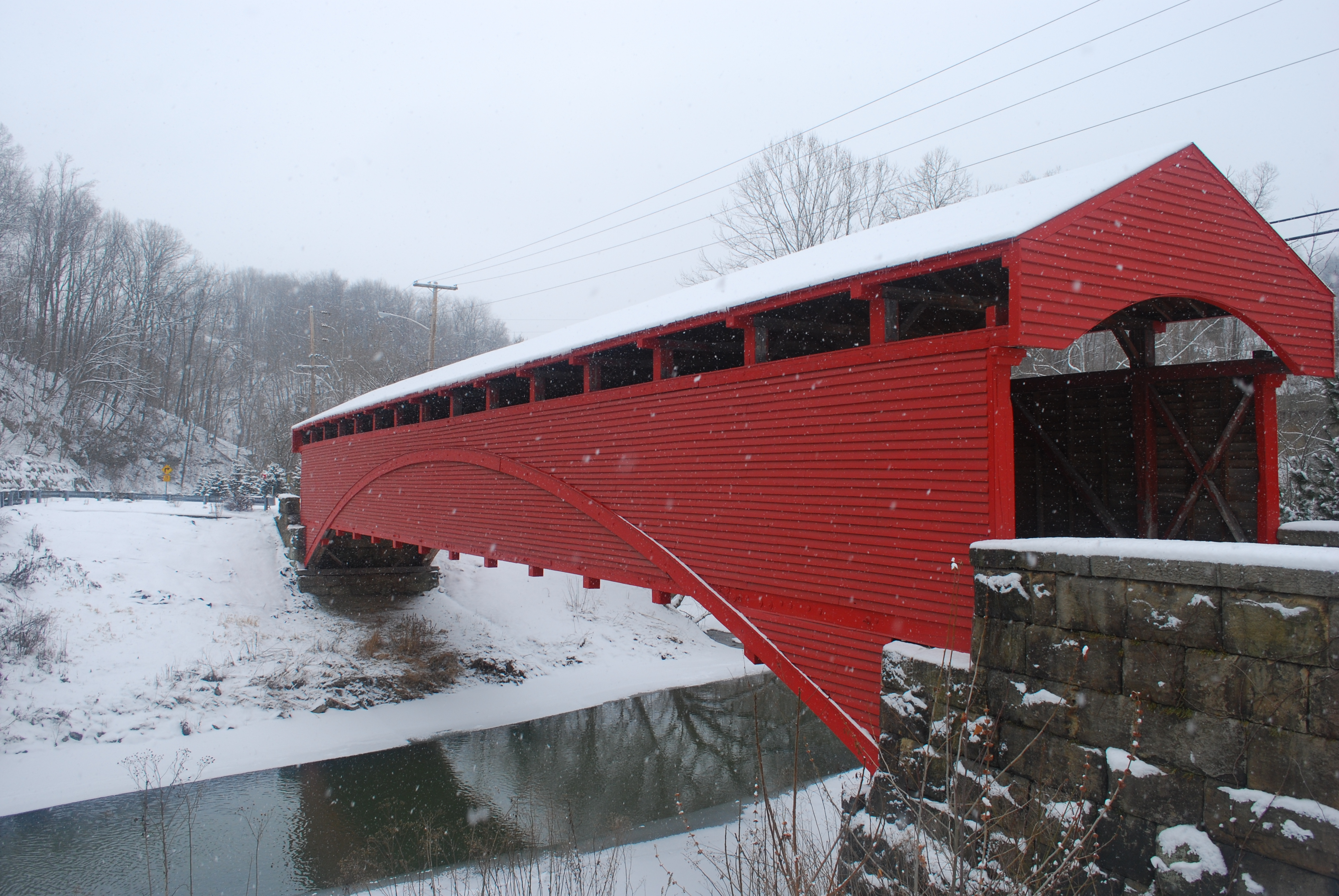
Barrackville Covered Bridge

This is a list of West Virginia covered bridges. There are 17 historic wooden covered bridges in the U.S. state of West Virginia. Only three of these bridges were built before 1870 and they are the three longest in the state. Each uses a standard truss design, braced with the Burr Arch. No one-truss design dominates in the state. The bridges are located in three general areas. In the south in Monroe and Greenbrier counties there are about a half dozen bridges within an easy drive of one another. To the north around Philippi is another group of bridges, including the historic Philippi Covered Bridge which is the longest (285 feet (87 m)) and an important part of state history for its associations with the American Civil War.

== Existing bridges ==
The following is a list of the 17 extant West Virginia covered bridges.

| Name | Image | Location^{[A]} | Year built | Length | Crosses | Design | Historical Notes |
|---|---|---|---|---|---|---|---|
| Barrackville Covered Bridge | | Barrackville, Marion County | 1853 | 146 feet (45 m) | Buffalo Creek | Multiple king post, Burr arch | Built by Lemuel Chenoweth |
| Carrollton Covered Bridge | | Carrollton, Barbour County | 1856 | 141 feet (43 m) | Buckhannon River | Multiple king post, Burr arch | Reconstructed 2022 after arson |
| Center Point Covered Bridge | | Center Point, Doddridge County | 1888 | 42 feet (13 m) | Pike Fork of McElroy Creek | Long truss | |
| Dents Run Covered Bridge | | Laurel Point, Monongalia County | 1889 | 40 feet (12 m) | Dents Run | King post | |
| Fish Creek Covered Bridge aka "Hundred Covered Bridge" | | Hundred, Wetzel County | 1881, 2001 | 30 feet (9.1 m) | Fish Creek | King post | |
| Fletcher Covered Bridge aka "Ten Mile Creek Covered Bridge" | | Cutler, Harrison County | 1891 | 58 feet (18 m) | Tenmile Creek | Multiple king post | |
| Herns Mill Covered Bridge aka "Milligan Creek Covered Bridge" | | Asbury, Greenbrier County | 1884 | 54 feet (16 m) | Milligans Creek | Queen post | |
| Hokes Mill Covered Bridge aka "Second Creek Covered Bridge" | | Hokes Mill, Greenbrier County | 1899 | 82 feet (25 m) | Second Creek | Long truss | |
| Indian Creek Covered Bridge | | Union, Monroe County | 1903 | 48 feet (15 m) | Indian Creek | Long truss | |
| Laurel Creek Covered Bridge aka "Lily Dale Covered Bridge" | | Lillydale, Monroe County | 1911 | 22 feet (6.7 m) | Laurel Creek | Howe truss | |
| Locust Creek Covered Bridge | | Hillsboro, Pocahontas County | 1870 | 113 feet (34 m) | Monroe Creek | Warren truss | |
| Mud River Covered Bridge | | Milton, Cabell County | 1875 | 108 feet (33 m) | Mud River | Howe truss | |
| Philippi Covered Bridge | | Philippi, Barbour County | 1852 | 285 feet (87 m) | Tygart Valley River | Long truss with Burr arch | Built by Chenoweth |
| Sarvis Fork Covered Bridge aka "Sandy Creek Covered Bridge" and "New Era Covered Bridge" | | Sandyville, Jackson County | 1889, 2000 | 101 feet (31 m) | Left Fork Sandy Creek | Long truss | |
| Simpson Creek Covered Bridge aka "Hollens Mill Covered Bridge" | | Bridgeport, Harrison County | 1881 | 74 feet (23 m) | Simpson Creek | Multiple king post | |
| Staats Mill Covered Bridge | | Ripley, Jackson County | 1887 | 97 feet (30 m) | Pond | Long truss | Originally over Tug Fork, Big Mill Creek |
| Walkersville Covered Bridge | | Walkersville, Lewis County | 1903 | 54 feet (16 m) | Right Fork of West Fork River | Queen post | |

== Former bridges ==
The following is a list of no longer extant West Virginia covered bridges. A complete list of covered bridges that have existed at one time or another in the state would exceed 100.

Barbour County

- Audra Covered Bridge, 18??, Audra (Burnt, 1940s)
- Moatsville Covered Bridge, 18??, across the Tygart Valley River at Moatsville (Destroyed, 19??s)

Braxton County

- Bulltown Covered Bridge, 1854

Doddridge County

- West Union Covered Bridge, 1843 across Middle Island Creek (Destroyed in flood, June 1950).

Greenbrier County

- Greenbrier Covered Bridge, 18??, across Greenbrier River; near Lewisburg

Harrison County

- Maulsby Covered Bridge, 1848, across West Fork River (part of Weston and Fairmont Turnpike Company)

Lewis County

- Weston Covered Bridge, 18??, across Stonecoal Creek, (Chenoweth; destroyed).

Marion County

- Paw Paw Creek Covered Bridge, 18??, Grant Town (Destroyed in flood, August 1980)

Monongalia County

- Wadestown Covered Bridge, 18??, across the West Virginia branch of Dunkard Creek.

Preston County

- Cheat River Covered Bridge (aka Northwestern Turnpike, or Tygart Valley, Bridge), 1835, across Cheat River near Rowlesburg (Burnt, 1964)

Randolph County

- Beverly Covered Bridge, 1845, Chenoweth's first bridge (destroyed ca. 1863); part of the Staunton and Parkersburg Turnpike; rebuilt by Chenoweth (1872–73; destroyed again after 1952).
- Cheat Bridge Covered Bridge, 1841, across Cheat River at Cheat Bridge (Removed, 1910)

Randolph/Upshur Counties

- Middle Fork Covered Bridge, 18??, across Middle Fork River spanning county border (Chenoweth; destroyed).

Ritchie County

- Berea Covered Bridge, 18??, across South Fork Hughes River at Berea, West Virginia. (Destroyed)

Taylor County

- Valley Bridge, 1834, across Tygart Valley River (part of the Northwestern Turnpike) at Fetterman (Destroyed in flood, 1888).

Upshur County

- Buckhannon Covered Bridge, 18?? (Chenoweth; destroyed).

== See also ==
- List of bridges on the National Register of Historic Places in West Virginia
- World Guide to Covered Bridges
