= Sand Fork =

Sand Fork may refer to:

- Sand Fork (Little Kanawha River), a stream in West Virginia
- Sand Fork, West Virginia, a town
