= Locust Creek Covered Bridge =

Locust Creek Covered Bridge can refer to:

- Locust Creek Covered Bridge (West Virginia) in Pocahontas County, West Virginia
- Locust Creek Covered Bridge (Missouri) in Linn County, Missouri
