= Fletcher Covered Bridge =

United States historic place

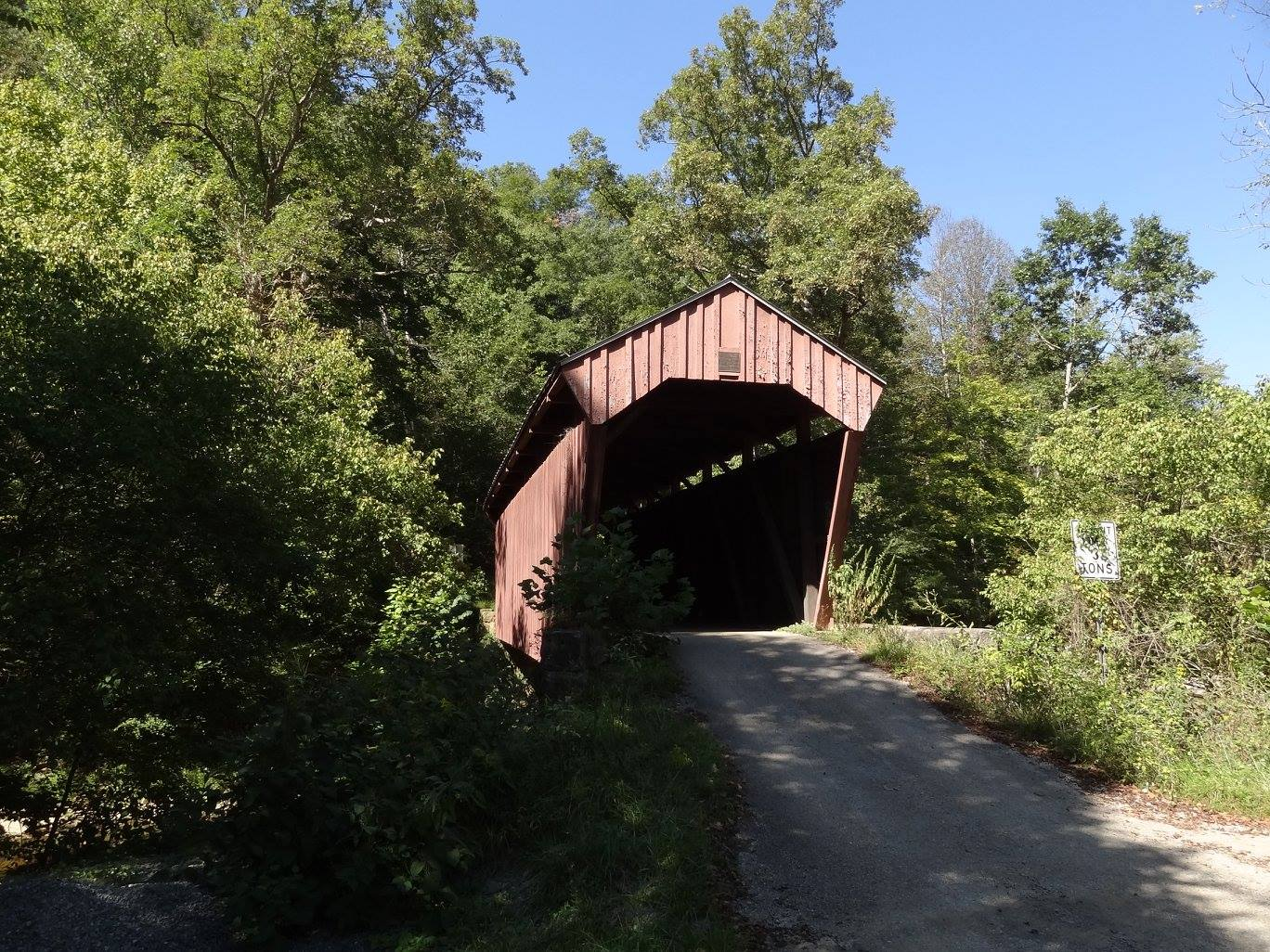
- Coordinates: 39°18′19″N 80°28′49″W
- Carries: County Route 5/29
- Crosses: Tenmile Creek
- Locale: Harrison, West Virginia, United States
- Maintained by: West Virginia Division of Highways
- NBI Number: 00000000017A032

Characteristics
- Design: U.S. National Register of Historic Places
- Total length: 62 ft (19 m)
- Width: 3.2 m (10 ft)
- Load limit: 5 short tons (4.5 t)

History
- Constructed by: Soloman Swiger, L. E. Strum
- Built: 1891
- Fletcher Covered Bridge
- U.S. National Register of Historic Places
- MPS: West Virginia Covered Bridges TR
- NRHP reference No.: 81000601
- Added to NRHP: June 4, 1981

Location
- Interactive map of Fletcher Covered Bridge

The Fletcher Covered Bridge is a 62-foot (19 m) Multiple King Post covered bridge located near Marshville in Harrison County, West Virginia. The bridge crosses Tenmile Creek is West Virginia bridge number 48-17-03. Stones for the abutments were quarried at the top of a hill near the bridge site. The original building cost was $1,372. The Fletcher Covered Bridge is one of only two covered bridges still standing in Harrison County, the other is the Simpson Creek Covered Bridge. This bridge is in regular use today.

== Location ==
Fletcher Covered Bridge is located on Marshville Road 1.6 miles past the intersection with US Route 50.

== Upgrades ==
Under a $447,000 contract, Allegheny Restoration and Builders, Inc. of Morgantown restored the Fletcher Covered Bridge, including detouring local traffic while structural timber was replaced and new siding and a metal roof were installed.

== See also ==
- List of West Virginia covered bridges
- History.com
