= Sarvis Fork Covered Bridge =

- U.S. National Register of Historic Places
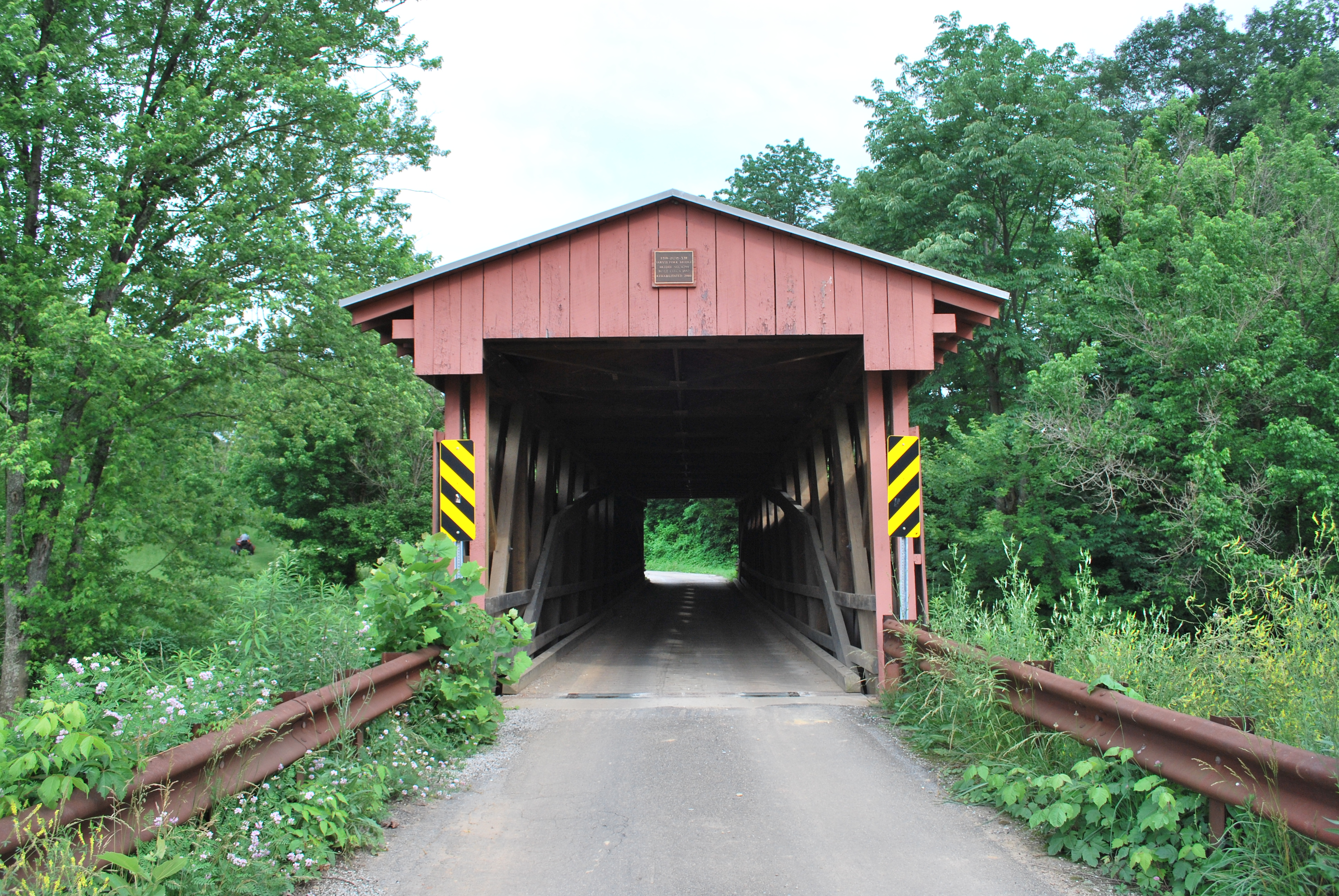
- Sarvis Fork Covered Bridge, June 2009

- Location within West Virginia Location within the United States
- Location: County Route 21/15, near Sandyville, West Virginia
- Coordinates: 38°55′17″N 81°38′41″W
- Area: less than one acre
- Built: 1889
- Architect: Quincy, J. Grim; Cunningham, R.B.
- Architectural style: Long Truss
- MPS: West Virginia Covered Bridges TR
- NRHP reference No.: 81000602
- Added to NRHP: June 4, 1981

Sarvis Fork Covered Bridge, also known as Sandyville Covered Bridge, is a historic covered bridge located near Sandyville, Jackson County, West Virginia. It was built in 1889-1890 for $64.00 by R.B. Cunningham and G.W. Staats in 1890, originally spanning John Carnahan's Fork, a branch of Mill Creek. When US Route 33 was built using an iron bridge, the covered bridge was first abandoned, then moved and rebuilt over the Left Fork of the Sandy Creek in 1924 for $1,050.00.

The bridge was completely rebuilt in 2000 at a cost of $598,233 by R.C. Construction Company & Sons, Inc. of Cutler, Ohio.

It measures 101 feet 3 1/2 inches in length and 11 feet 8 inches wide.

It was listed on the National Register of Historic Places in 1981.

== See also ==
- List of covered bridges in West Virginia
