= Duck Run Cable Suspension Bridge =

- U.S. National Register of Historic Places
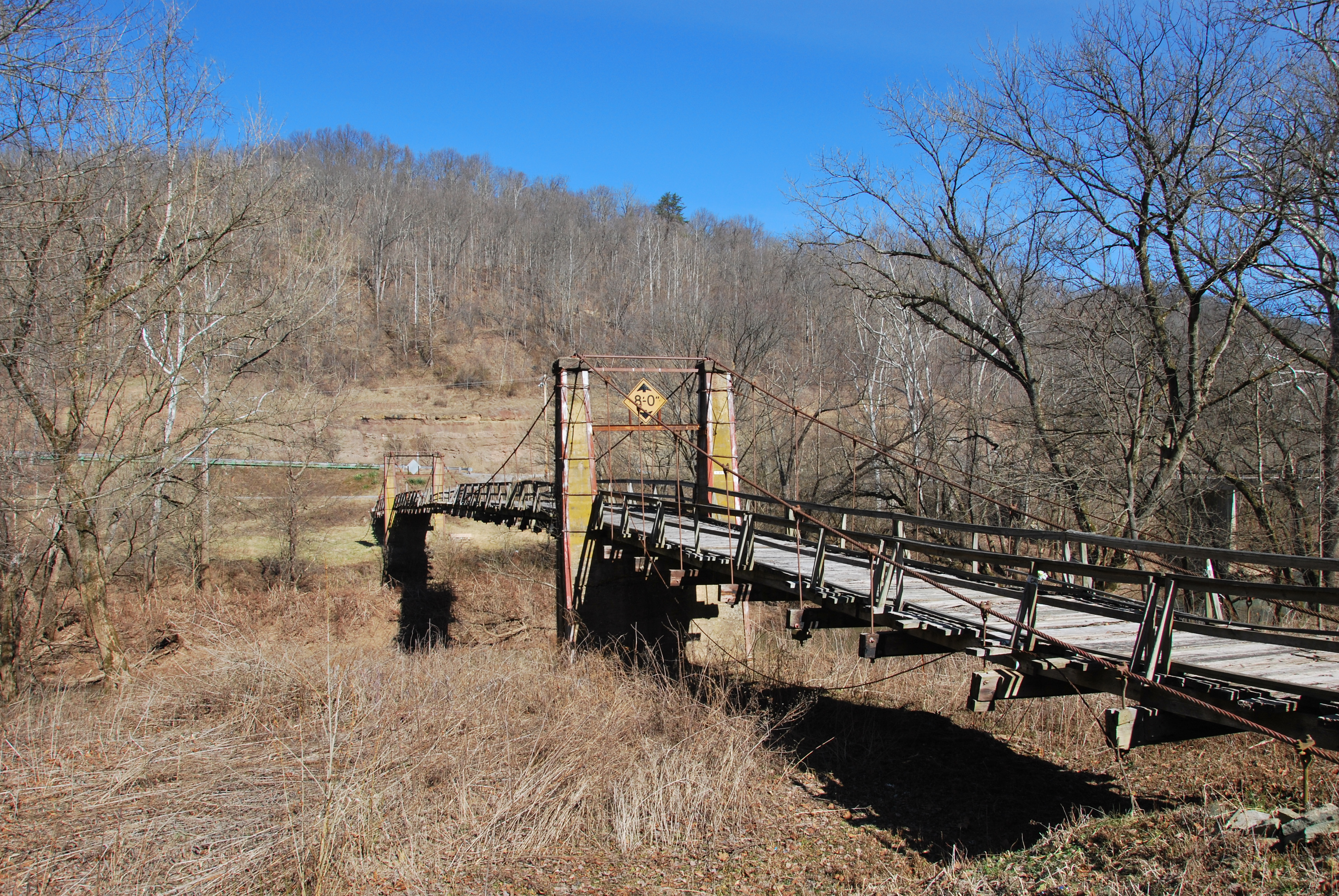
- Duck Run Suspension Bridge, February 2011

- Location within West Virginia Location within the United States
- Location: Over the Kanawha R. S of jct. of WV 5 and WV 30, Trubada, West Virginia
- Coordinates: 38.928295°N 80.787333°W
- Area: less than one acre
- Built: 1922
- Architect: Moss, William M.; Lewis, Fred
- Architectural style: cable suspension bridge
- NRHP reference No.: 97000783
- Added to NRHP: July 9, 1997

Duck Run Cable Suspension Bridge, also known as Trubada Swinging Bridge, is a historic cable suspension bridge that spans the Little Kanawha River at Trubada, Gilmer County, West Virginia. The bridge was built in 1922. The bridge is 351 feet, 7 inches, with a main span of 209 feet, 9 inches, and two half spans of 76 feet, 6 inches, and 65 feet, 4 inches. It features four reinforced concrete towers for the two wire rope cables.

It was listed on the National Register of Historic Places in 1997.
