= Laurel Creek Covered Bridge =

- U.S. National Register of Historic Places
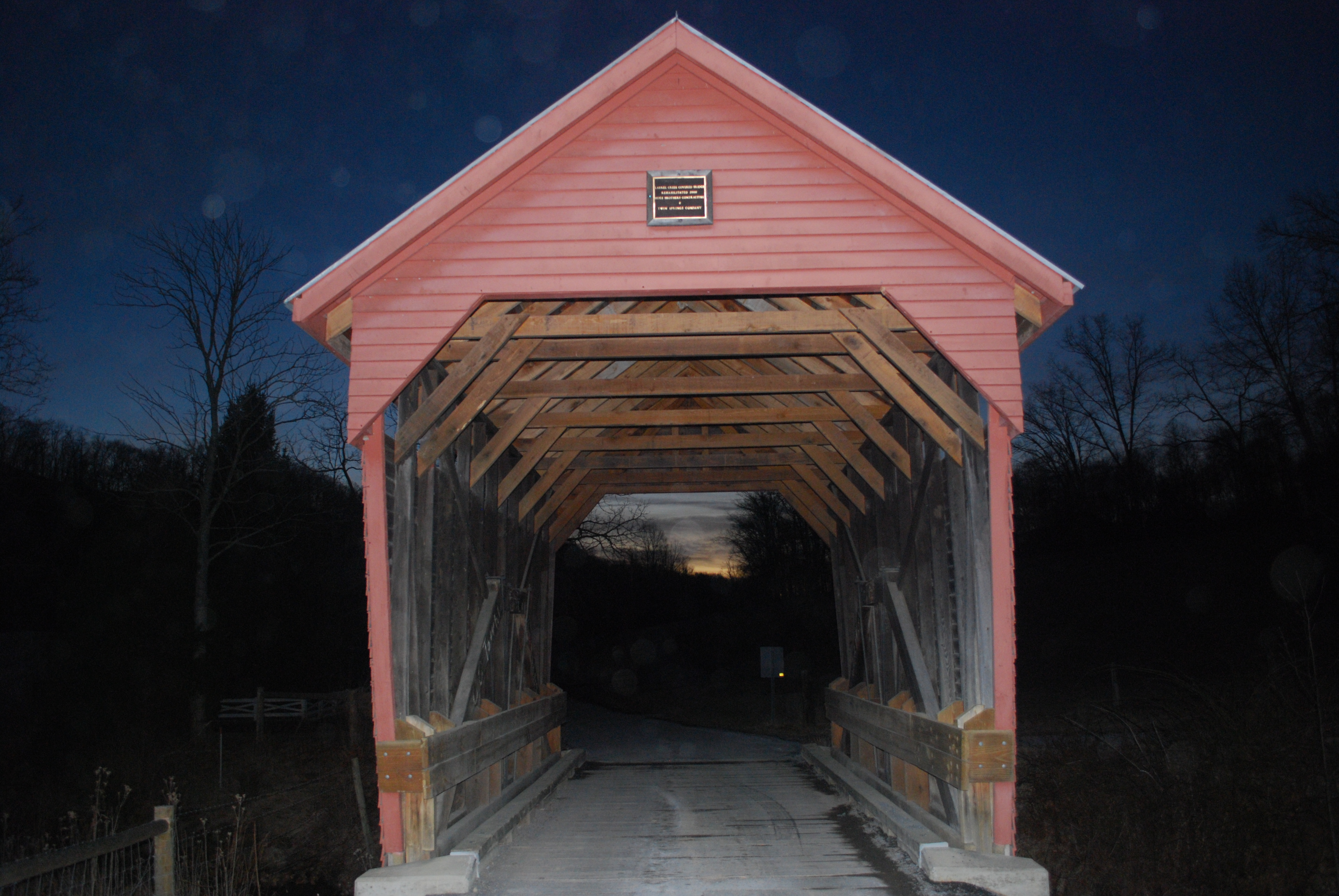
- Laurel Creek Covered Bridge, February 2009

- Location within West Virginia Location within the United States
- Location: County Route 23/4 west of County Route 219/11, Lillydale, West Virginia
- Coordinates: 37°33′40″N 80°37′36″W
- Area: less than one acre
- Built: 1910
- Built by: Lewis Miller (stonework); Robert Arnott (structure)
- MPS: West Virginia Covered Bridges TR
- NRHP reference No.: 81000605
- Added to NRHP: June 4, 1981

Laurel Creek Covered Bridge is a historic covered bridge located near Lillydale, Monroe County, West Virginia. It was built in 1910. The shortest covered bridge in the state, it measures 34 feet, 6 inches long and 13 feet, 2 1/2 inches wide. It has wood siding painted red and a galvanized metal roof. By 1981, it was one of only 17 covered bridges left in West Virginia.

It was listed on the National Register of Historic Places in 1981.

== See also ==
- List of covered bridges in West Virginia
