= Carrollton Covered Bridge =

Historic place in West Virginia, United States

- U.S. National Register of Historic Places
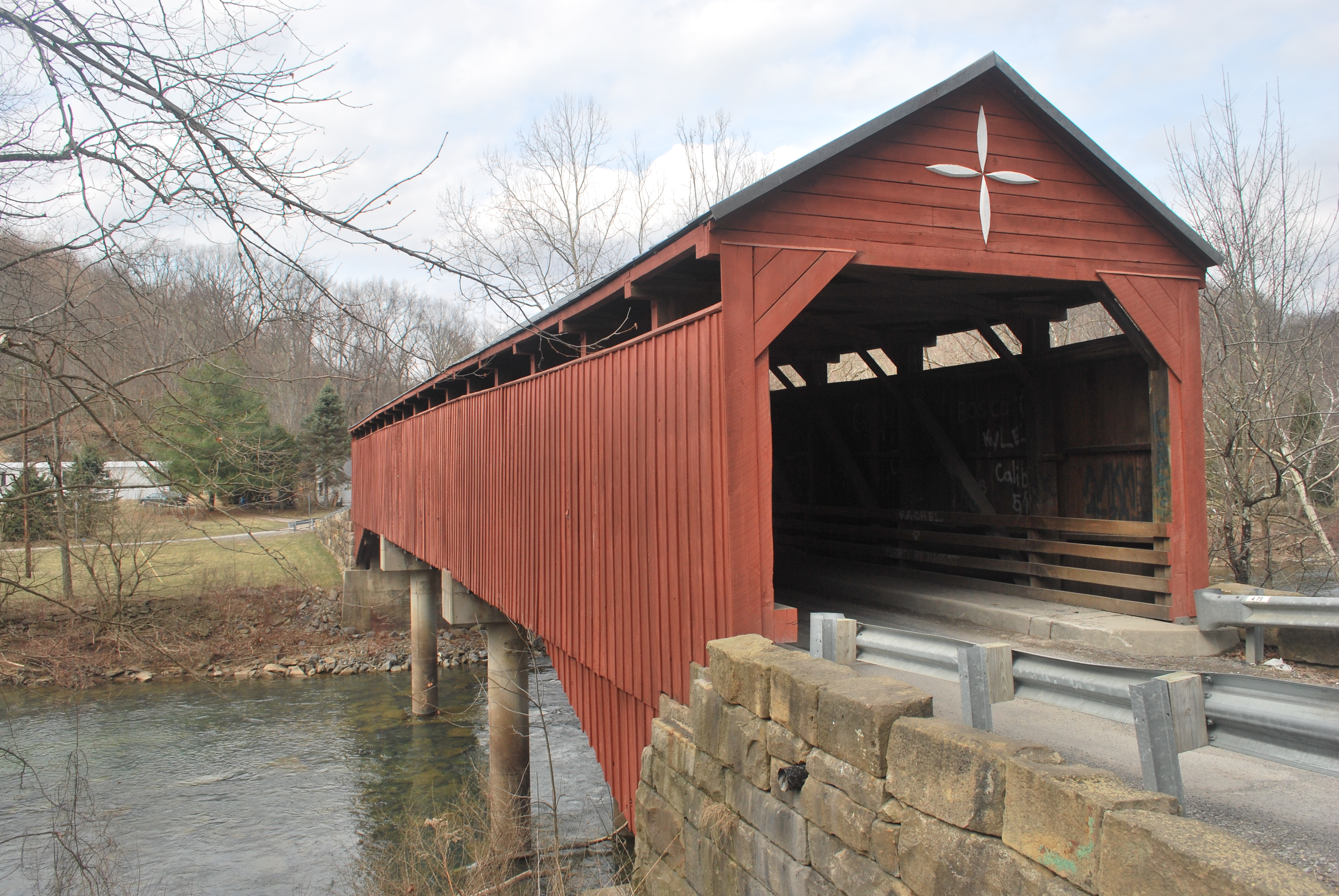

- Location within West Virginia Location within the United States
- Location: Carrollton, West Virginia
- Coordinates: 39°5′24.23″N 80°5′12.19″W
- Built: 1856
- Architect: Emmet J. & Daniel O'Brien
- NRHP reference No.: 81000595
- Added to NRHP: June 4, 1981

The Carrollton Covered Bridge, in Barbour County, West Virginia, U.S., is the second longest and third oldest surviving covered bridge in the state. The wooden bridge spans the Buckhannon River near Carrollton and was built in 1856 by Emmet J. O'Brien and Daniel O'Brien. It carried the Middle Fork Turnpike, an important connecting road between the Staunton and Parkersburg Turnpike and a road to Clarksburg.

== Description ==
The Carrollton bridge is 140 feet 9 inches (42.90 m) long and 16 feet (4.9 m) wide, with Burr trusses using multiple Kingpost trusses for a clear span, the second longest among West Virginia's surviving covered bridges. After the bridge was declared unsafe in 1962, the wood decking was replaced by a concrete deck, one lane wide with a sidewalk, supported by concrete piers and abutments, no longer a clear span.

== Historic designation and fire ==
The bridge was added to the National Register of Historic Places on June 4, 1981. It was renovated in 1987 and again in 2002.

The bridge was heavily damaged in a fire, determined to have been arson, on August 10, 2017. The bridge was restored using a mixture of salvaged and new timber by West Virginia Division of Highways crews in 2022.

== See also ==
- List of West Virginia covered bridges
- List of bridges on the National Register of Historic Places in West Virginia
- National Register of Historic Places listings in Barbour County, West Virginia
