= Walkersville Covered Bridge =

- U.S. National Register of Historic Places
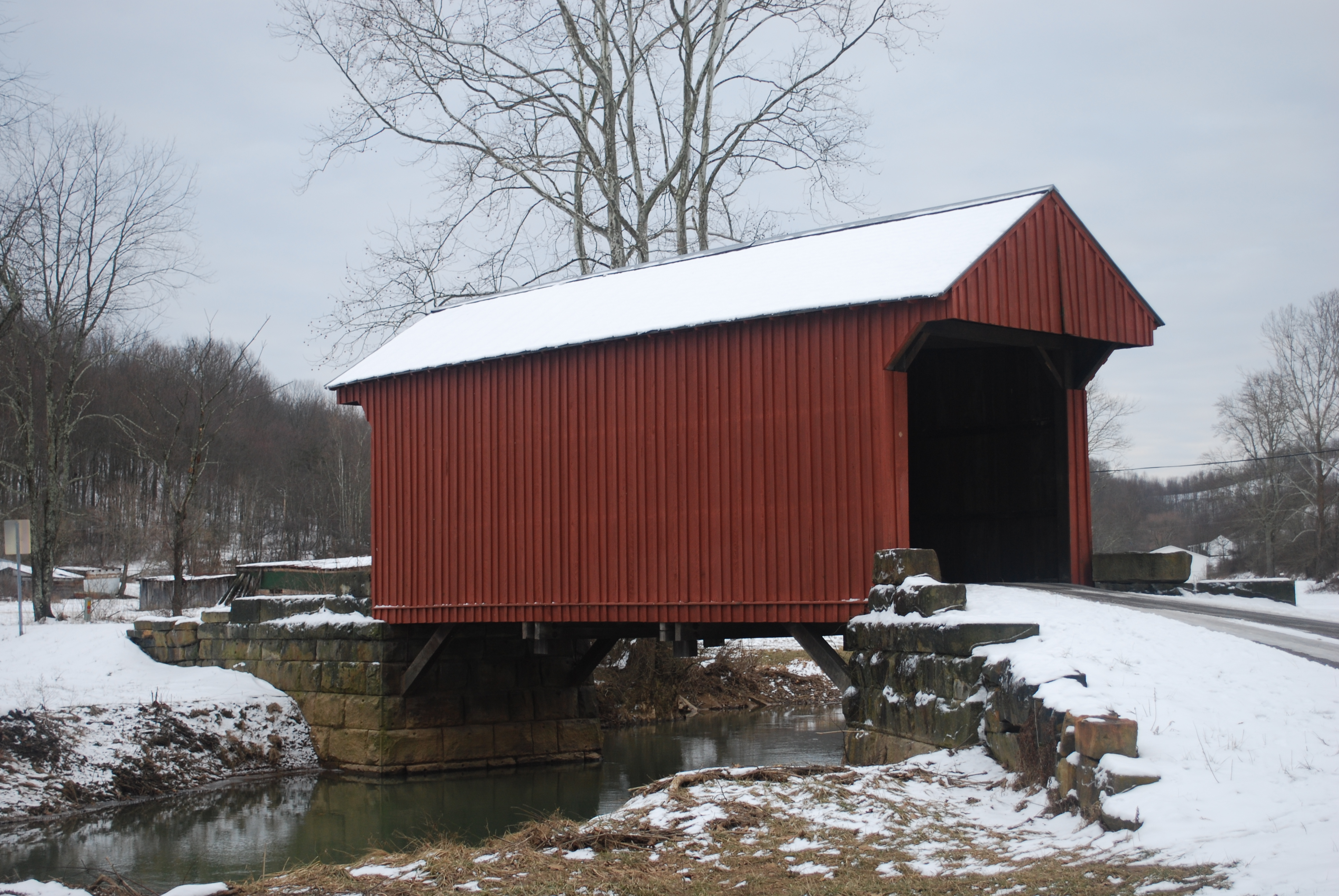
- Walkersville Covered Bridge, January 2009

- Location within West Virginia Location within the United States
- Location: On County Route 19/17 near U.S. Route 19, near Walkersville, West Virginia
- Coordinates: 38°51′30″N 80°27′39″W
- Area: less than one acre
- Built: 1903
- Architect: John G. Sprigg
- Architectural style: Queenpost Truss
- MPS: West Virginia Covered Bridges TR
- NRHP reference No.: 81000603
- Added to NRHP: June 4, 1981

Walkersville Covered Bridge is a historic covered bridge near Walkersville, Lewis County, West Virginia. It was built in 1903, and is a Queen post truss bridge measuring 12 feet, 1 1/2 inches wide and 39 feet, 4 inches long. It has red board-and-batten siding and a standing seam metal roof. It was built to span the right fork of the West Fork River.

It was listed on the National Register of Historic Places in 1981.

== See also ==
- List of covered bridges in West Virginia
