= Dents Run Covered Bridge =

- U.S. National Register of Historic Places
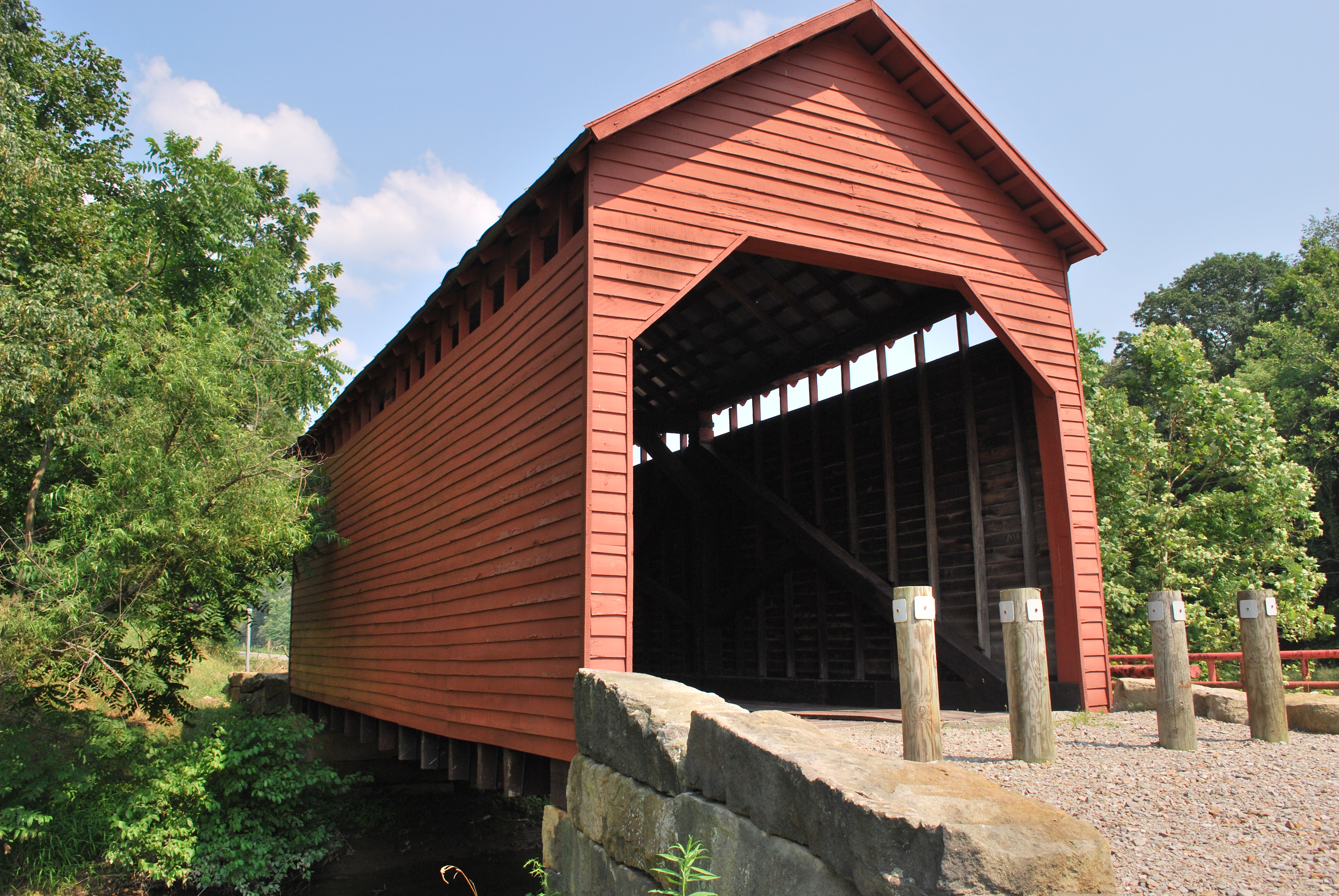
- Dents Run Covered Bridge, July 2008

- Location within West Virginia Location within the United States
- Location: County Route 43/4 near junction of County Route 43 crossing Dents Run, near Laurel Point, West Virginia
- Coordinates: 39°37′26″N 80°2′24″W
- Area: less than one acre
- Built: 1889
- Built by: W. A. Loar (stonework); Joseph & William Mercer (wood bridge)
- Architectural style: Kingpost truss
- MPS: West Virginia Covered Bridges TR
- NRHP reference No.: 81000604
- Added to NRHP: June 4, 1981

Dents Run Covered Bridge is a historic covered bridge located near Laurel Point, Monongalia County, West Virginia, United States. It was built in 1889, and spans Dents Run. The bridge is of Kingpost truss construction and measures 12 feet and 10 inches wide and 40 feet long. By 1981, it was one of only 17 covered bridges left in West Virginia.

It was listed on the National Register of Historic Places in 1981.

== See also ==
- List of covered bridges in West Virginia
