= Indian Creek Covered Bridge =

- U.S. National Register of Historic Places
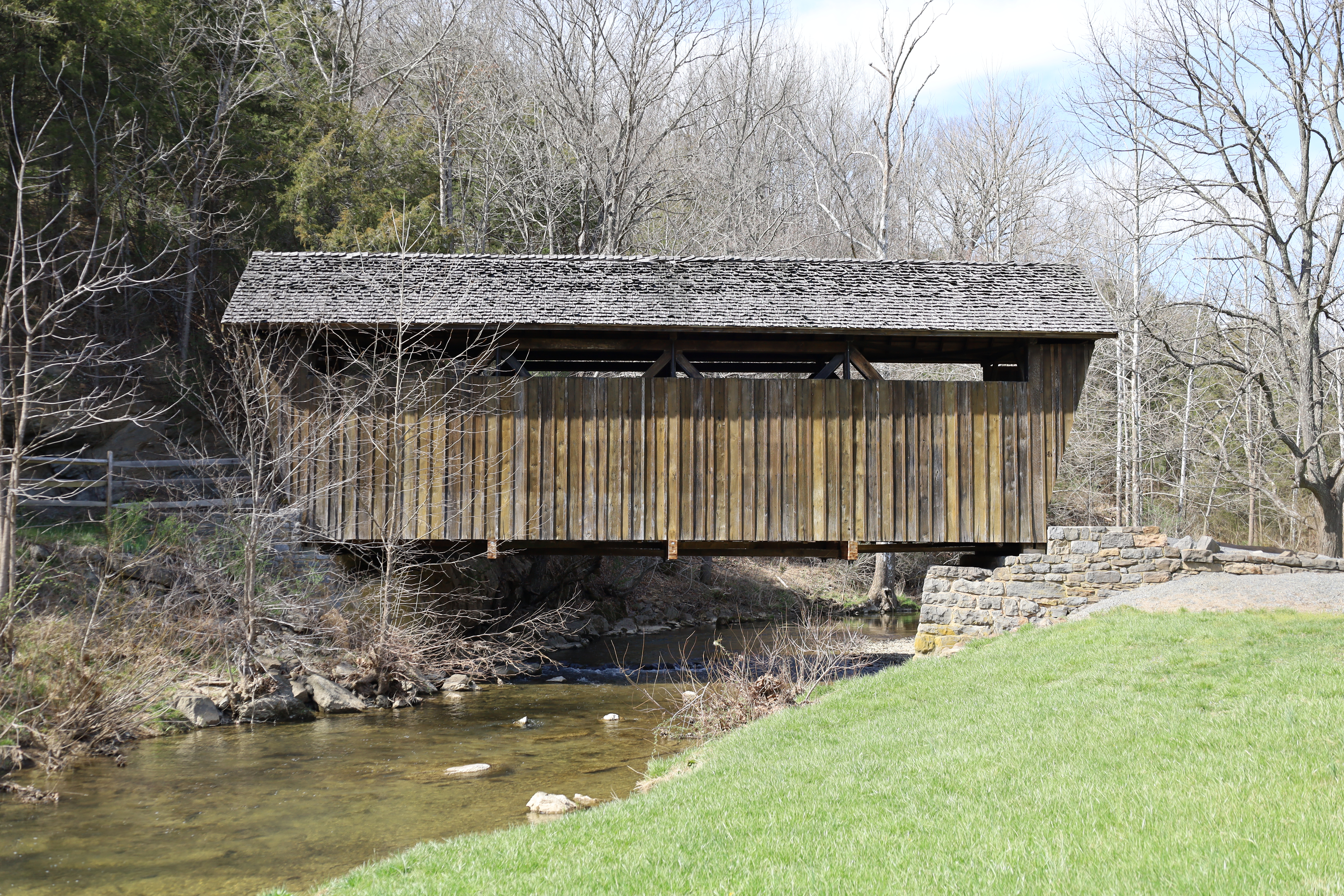
- The bridge in 2022

- Location within West Virginia Location within the United States
- Location: 1.5 mi (2.4 km) south of Salt Sulphur Springs on U.S. Route 219, near Salt Sulphur Springs, West Virginia
- Coordinates: 37°32′50″N 80°34′22″W
- Area: 1 acre (0.40 ha)
- Built: 1898
- Built by: Oscar & Ray Weikel
- Architectural style: Howe truss
- MPS: West Virginia Covered Bridges TR
- NRHP reference No.: 75001895
- Added to NRHP: April 1, 1975

The Indian Creek Covered Bridge is a historic covered bridge near US 219, about 4 miles away from Salt Sulphur Springs, in Monroe County, West Virginia, United States. It is owned by the Monroe County Historical Society, and was originally built in 1898 by Ray and Oscar Weikel. The bridge is 49.25 feet long and 11.5 feet wide.

It was listed on the National Register of Historic Places in 1975.

The bridge was restored by Hoke Brothers Construction, Inc. of Union, West Virginia in 2000 at a cost of $334,446. It is open to pedestrians, and said to be one of the most photographed bridges in West Virginia.

== See also ==
- List of West Virginia covered bridges

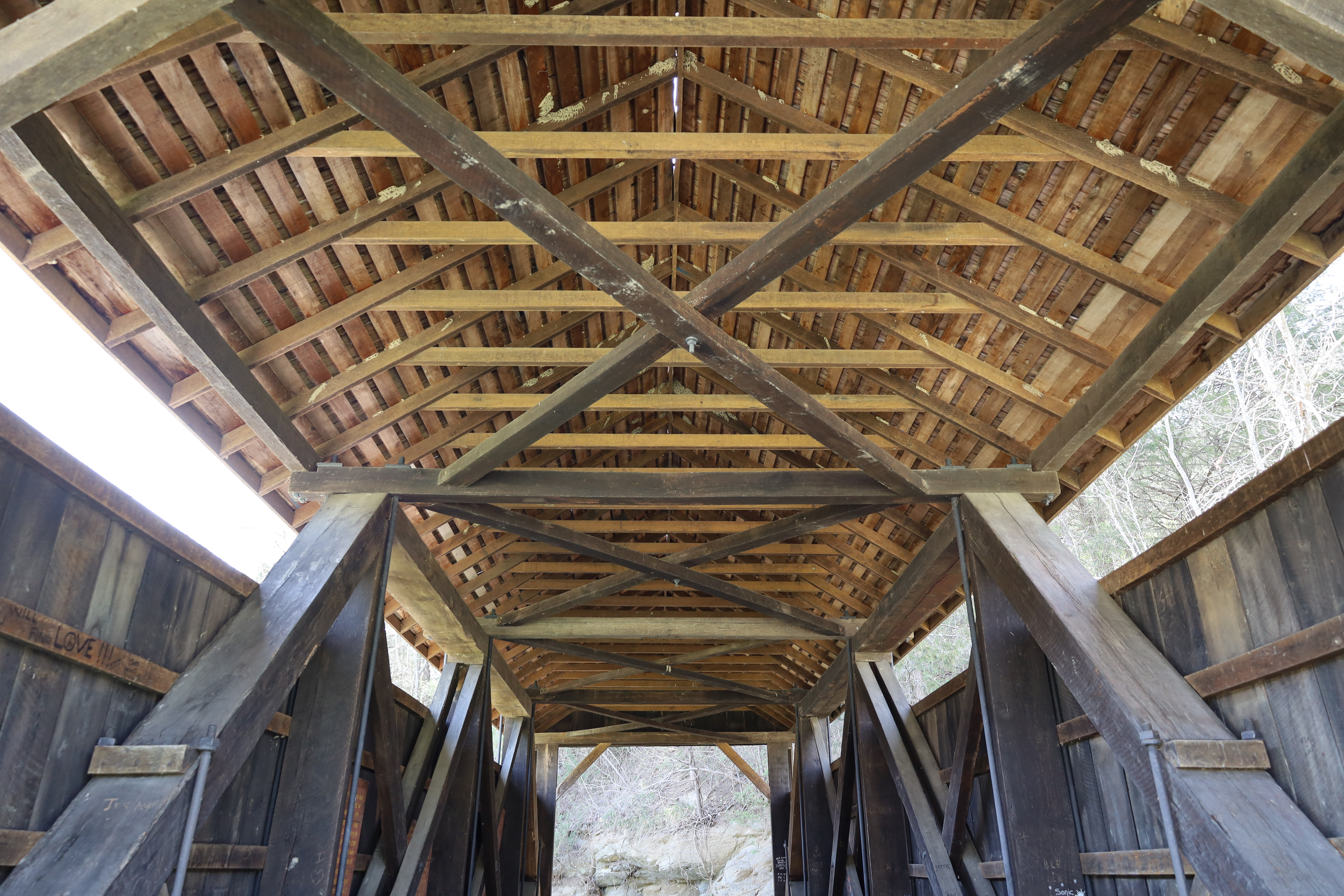
Interior of the bridge in 2022
