= Little Kanawha River =

Coordinates: 39.26535°N 81.56901°W

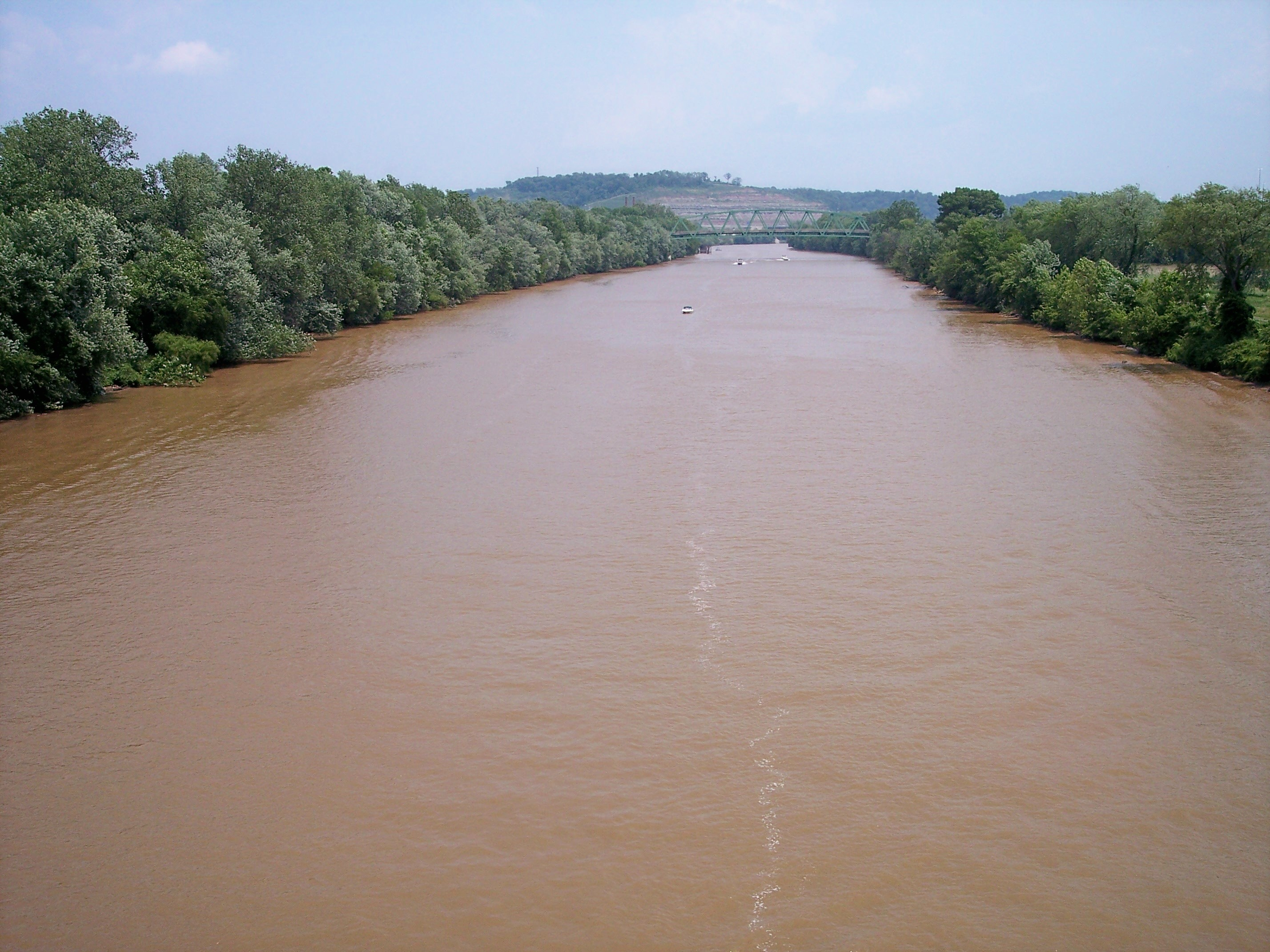
- The Little Kanawha River just upstream of its mouth in Parkersburg

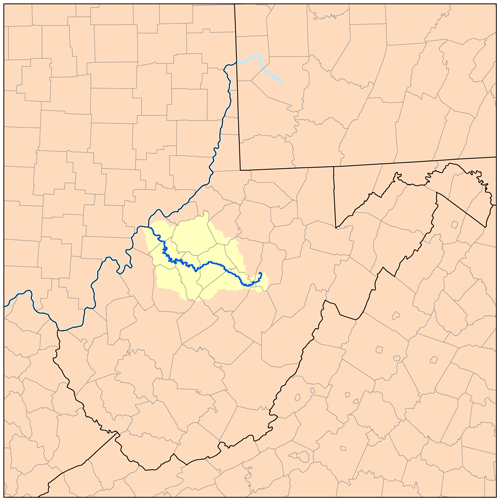

Location
- Country: United States

Physical characteristics
- Source
  - location: Upshur County, West Virginia
- Mouth
  - location: Ohio River, Parkersburg, West Virginia
- Length: 169 mi (272 km)
- Basin size: 2,320 mi^{2} (6,000 km^{2})
- Discharge
  - location: mouth
  - average: 3,187.67 cu ft/s (90.265 m^{3}/s) (estimate)

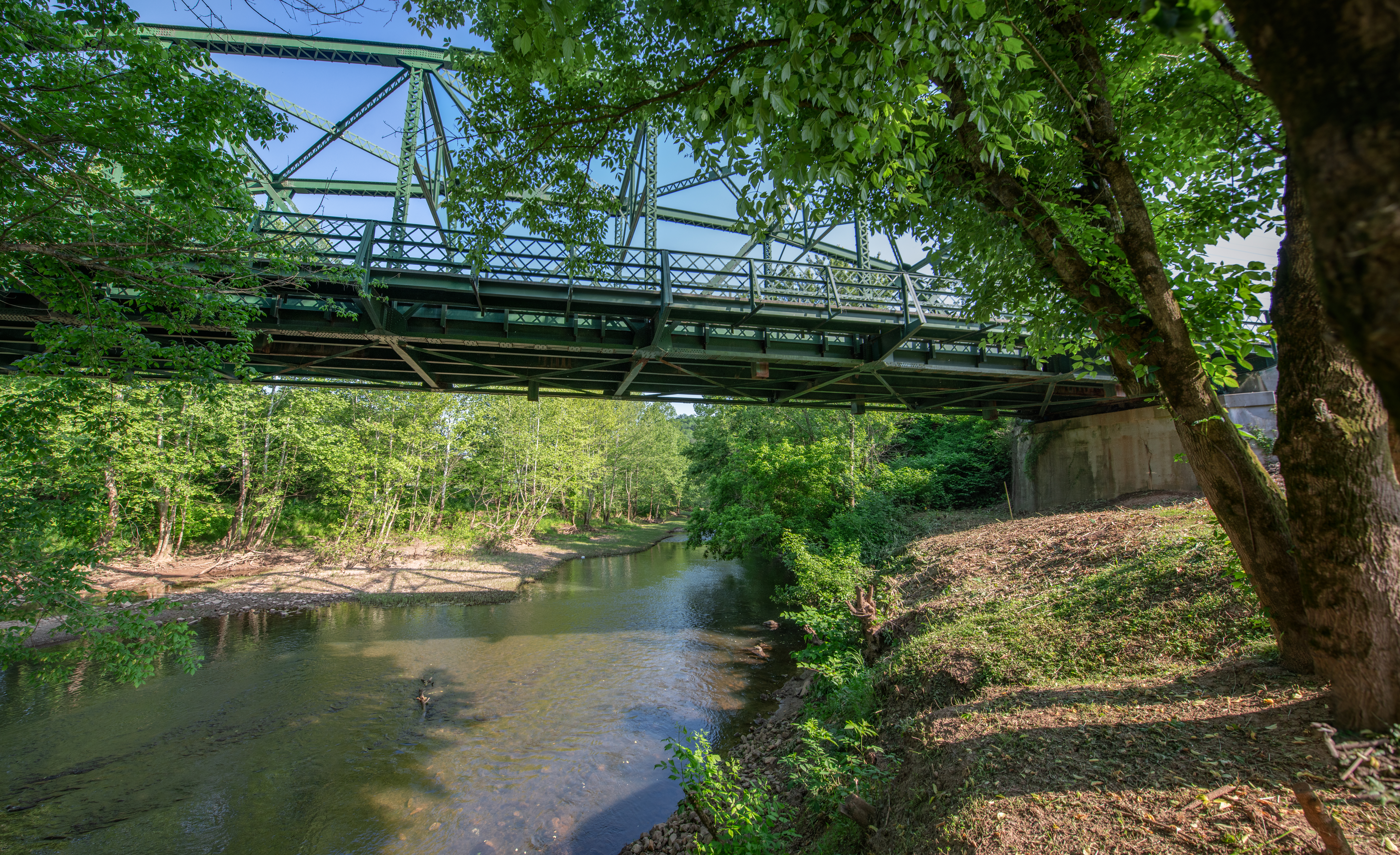
Little Kanawha River at Glenville Truss Bridge

The Little Kanawha River is a tributary of the Ohio River, 169 mi (269 km) long, in western West Virginia in the United States. Via the Ohio, it is part of the watershed of the Mississippi River, draining an area of 2,320 mi^{2} (6,009 km^{2}) on the unglaciated portion of the Allegheny Plateau. It served as an important commercial water route in the early history of West Virginia, particularly in the logging and petroleum industries.

== Course ==
The Little Kanawha rises in southern Upshur County, approximately 20 mi (32 km) south of Buckhannon. It follows a meandering course generally west-northwestwardly, through Lewis, Braxton, Gilmer, Calhoun, Wirt and Wood Counties, past the communities of Burnsville, Stouts Mills, Sand Fork, Glenville, Grantsville, Bigbend, Creston, Burning Springs, Palestine, Elizabeth, and Newark, to its mouth at the Ohio River in Parkersburg.

About 3 mi (5 km) upstream of Burnsville, a U.S. Army Corps of Engineers dam causes the river to form Burnsville Lake, which was completed in 1976 at a cost of $56.2 million.

== Tributaries ==
Along its course the Little Kanawha River collects the Right Fork Little Kanawha River on the boundary of Lewis and Braxton counties; Saltlick Creek, England Run and Oil Creek in Braxton County; Sand Fork, Cedar Creek and Leading Creek in Gilmer County; Steer Creek in Calhoun County; the West Fork Little Kanawha River, Spring Creek, Reedy Creek, and the Hughes River (its largest tributary) in Wirt County; and Walker Creek, Tygart Creek, Slate Creek and Worthington Creek in Wood County.

Additionally, a minor tributary near Grantsville is known as the Bull River; despite being named a "river," it is no larger than dozens of other small streams that flow into the Little Kanawha.

== Name ==
The Little Kanawha River was named for its smaller size relative to the nearby Kanawha River.

According to the Geographic Names Information System, the Little Kanawha River has also been known as:

- Fishing Creek
- Little Canawha River
- Little Canhawa River
- Little Conaway River
- Little Cunnaway River
- Little Kanahaway River
- Little Kanahwa River
- Little Kanahway River
- Little Kanawah River
- Little Kanhaway River
- Little Kanhawey River
- Little Kawahwa River
- Little Kenawah
- Little Kenhawa
- Little Kenhaway
- Little Kennaway River
- Nau-mis-sip-pia
- Newmissipi
- O-mom-go-how-ce-pe
- O-nim-go-how

== Recreation ==
=== Fishing ===
Multiple West Virginia state record fish have been caught along the Little Kanawha River.

== See also ==
- Kanawha River
- List of rivers of West Virginia
- Burnsville Bridge
- Duck Run Cable Suspension Bridge
- Glenville Truss Bridge
- Stouts Mill Bridge
