= Staats Mill Covered Bridge =

- U.S. National Register of Historic Places
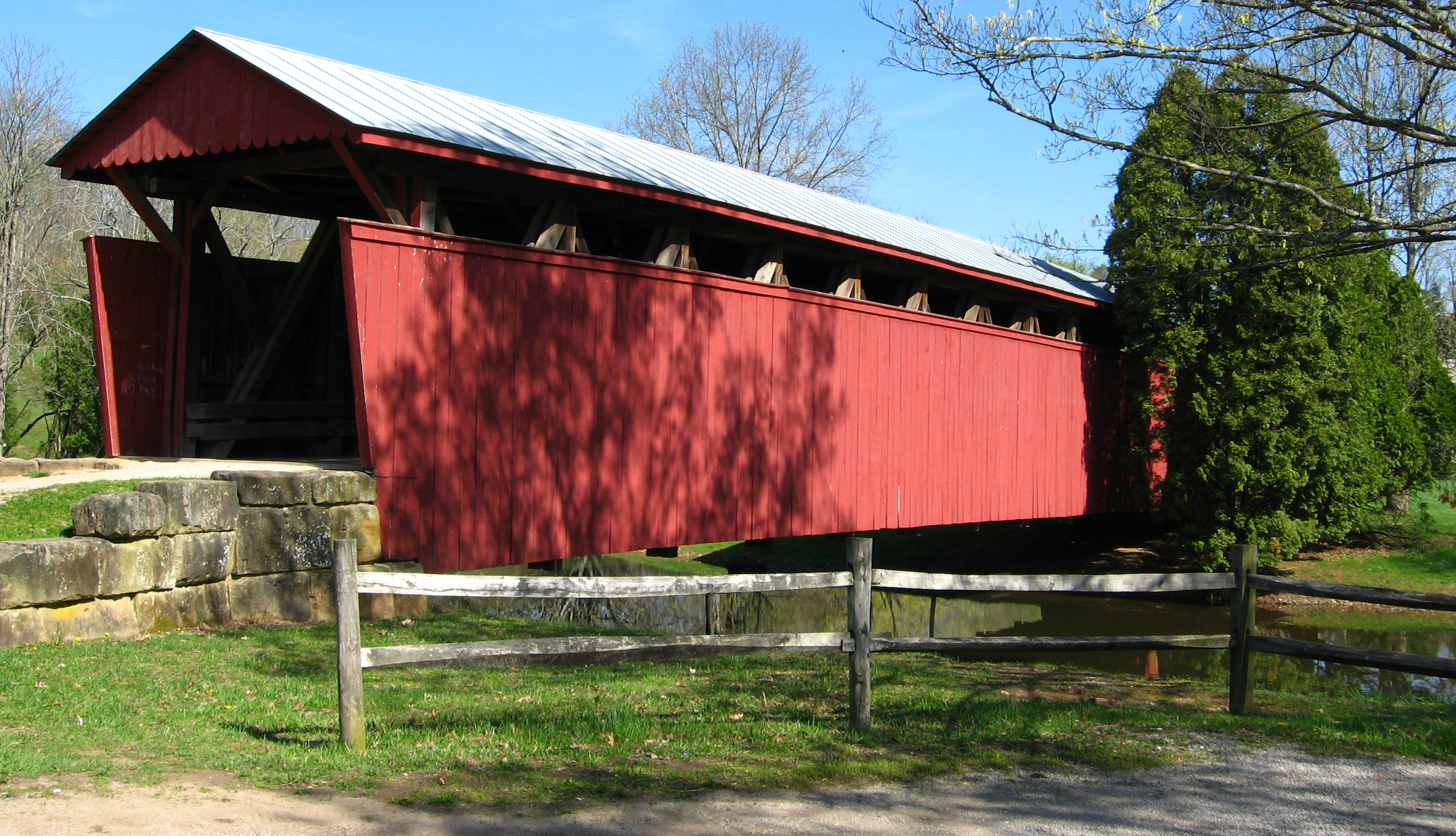
- Staats Mill Covered Bridge

- Location within West Virginia Location within the United States
- Location: Cedar Lakes, Jackson County, West Virginia
- Coordinates: 38°47′41″N 81°41′13″W
- Area: 0.3 acres (0.12 ha)
- Built: 1887
- Architect: Hartley, H. T.
- Architectural style: Long truss
- MPS: West Virginia Covered Bridges TR
- NRHP reference No.: 79002582
- Added to NRHP: 29 May 1979

Staats Mill Covered Bridge, also known as Tug Fork Covered Bridge, is a historic wooden covered bridge near Ripley in Jackson County, West Virginia, United States. Built in 1887, the Staats Mill Covered Bridge originally crossed the Tug Fork of Big Mill Creek and was named for Enoch Staats' water-powered mill.

The Staats family were early settlers to the area, arriving around 1780. The bridge was built adjacent to Enoch Staats' mill and store and played an important role in the history and development of Jackson County. Construction of the bridge was handled by the Jackson County Court, which paid a total of $1,788.35 to local craftspeople for completion of the structure.

Nearly 100 feet (30 m) long, the Staats Mill Covered Bridge was constructed using the Long system, patented by Stephen Long in 1830. The distinctive feature of Long trusses are the "X"-braced diagonals in each of the panels. This bridge has 11 such panels, each 8 feet 7 inches (2.62 m) long and 14 feet 3 inches (4.34 m) deep. The bridge is an impressive and historically significant example of a late nineteenth century timber-covered bridge building.

It was listed on the National Register of Historic Places in 1979.

In 1983, the old bridge was moved to the FFA-FHA State Camp at Cedar Lakes, 3 miles (5 km) from the original site and reconstructed across a pond at a cost of $104,000. It is in excellent condition and open to pedestrian traffic only. Central to the project, was the expertise and knowledge of Dr. Emory Kemp of West Virginia University.

== See also ==
- List of bridges documented by the Historic American Engineering Record in West Virginia
- List of West Virginia covered bridges
