= Marshville, West Virginia =

- Unincorporated community
- Location within West Virginia Location within the United States
- Coordinates: 39°19′17″N 80°27′51″W
- Country: United States
- State: West Virginia
- County: Harrison
- Elevation: 974 ft (297 m)
- Time zone: UTC-5 (Eastern (EST))
  - Summer (DST): UTC-4 (EDT)
- Area codes: 304 & 681
- GNIS feature ID: 1555056

Marshville is an unincorporated community in Harrison County, West Virginia, United States. Marshville is located along Tenmile Creek at the junction of County Routes 5 and 7/2, 7 miles (11 km) west-northwest of Clarksburg.
