= Van Metre Ford Stone Bridge =

Historic stone arch bridge located near Martinsburg, Berkeley County, West Virginia

- U.S. National Register of Historic Places
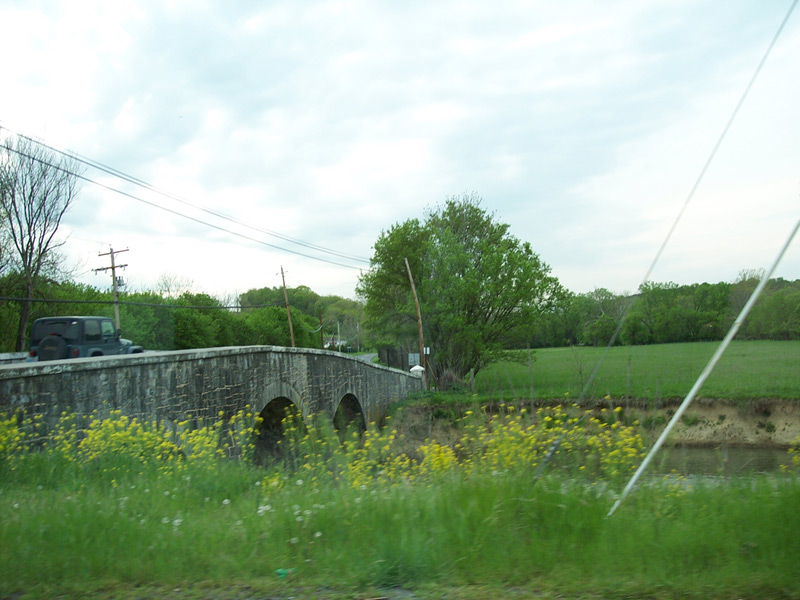
- Van Metre Ford Stone Bridge, May 2007

- Location within West Virginia Location within the United States
- Location: East of Martinsburg across Opequon Creek on Golf Course Road, Martinsburg, West Virginia
- Coordinates: 39°26′42″N 77°55′40″W
- Area: less than one acre
- Built: 1832
- Architect: Silas Harry
- Architectural style: Stone Arch
- NRHP reference No.: 77001373
- Added to NRHP: August 22, 1977

Van Metre Ford Stone Bridge is a historic stone arch bridge located near Martinsburg, Berkeley County, West Virginia. Built by Pennsylvania builder Silas Harry, it was built in 1832, and is a three span bridge crossing Opequon Creek. It is 132 feet long and constructed of ashlar limestone. The center span measures 32 feet and the two side spans are each 29.5 feet long.

It was listed on the National Register of Historic Places in 1977. A historic marker at the bridge says:

Named for the property owners this stone bridge built in 1832 across Opequon Creek was major improvement for travellers on Warm Springs Road connecting Alexandria and Bath Va., site of famous mineral waters. The Berkeley County Court established a commission to study and contract for construction of bridge. Silas Harry erected at local expense 165 foot bridge at reported cost of $3,700.

The bridge was replaced by a modern, two-lane bridge in 2016. The historic stone bridge remains as a pedestrian bridge.

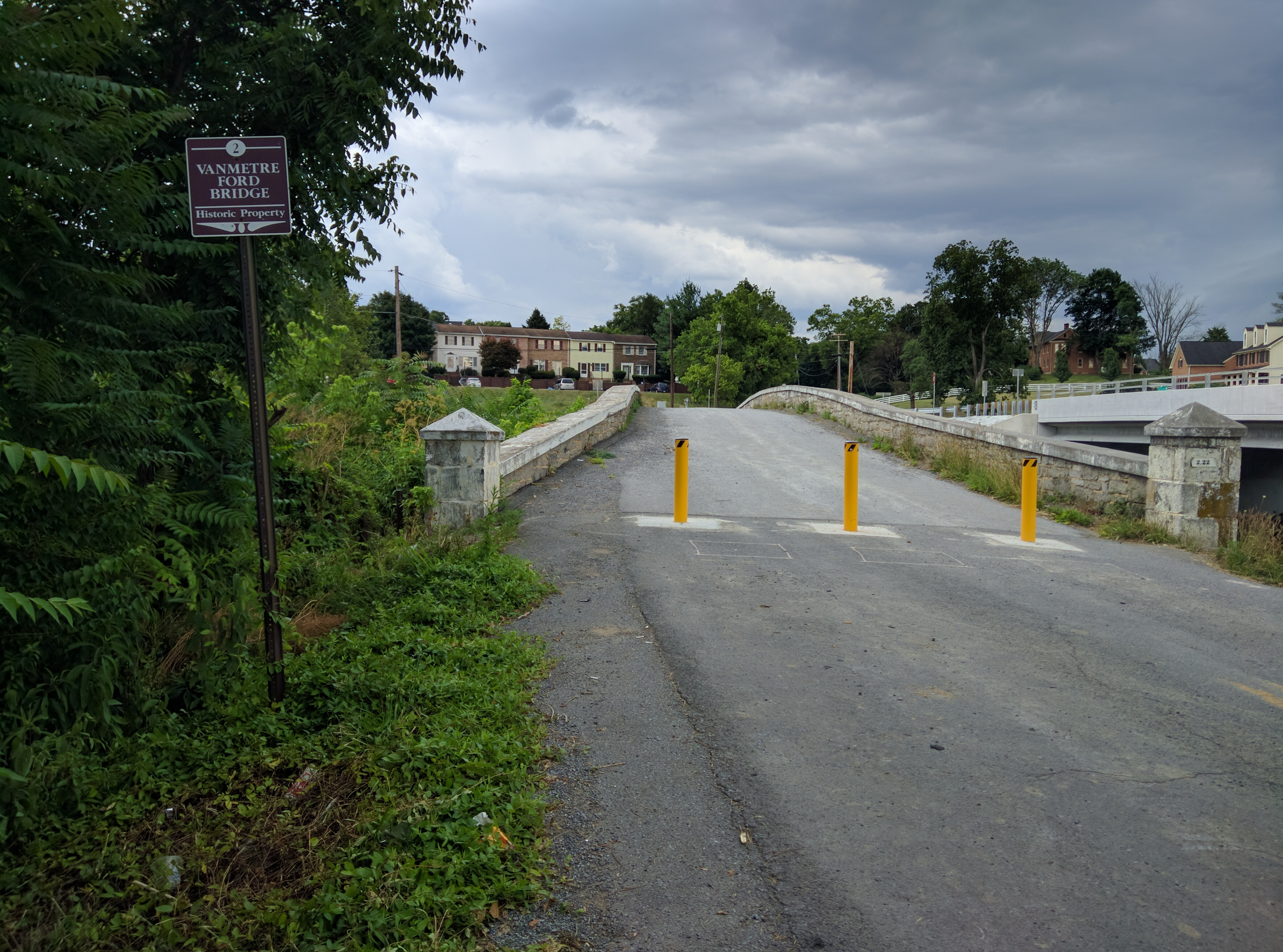
A view of Van Metre Ford Bridge from what was originally Golf Course road, but is now a defunct road that is used for parking.

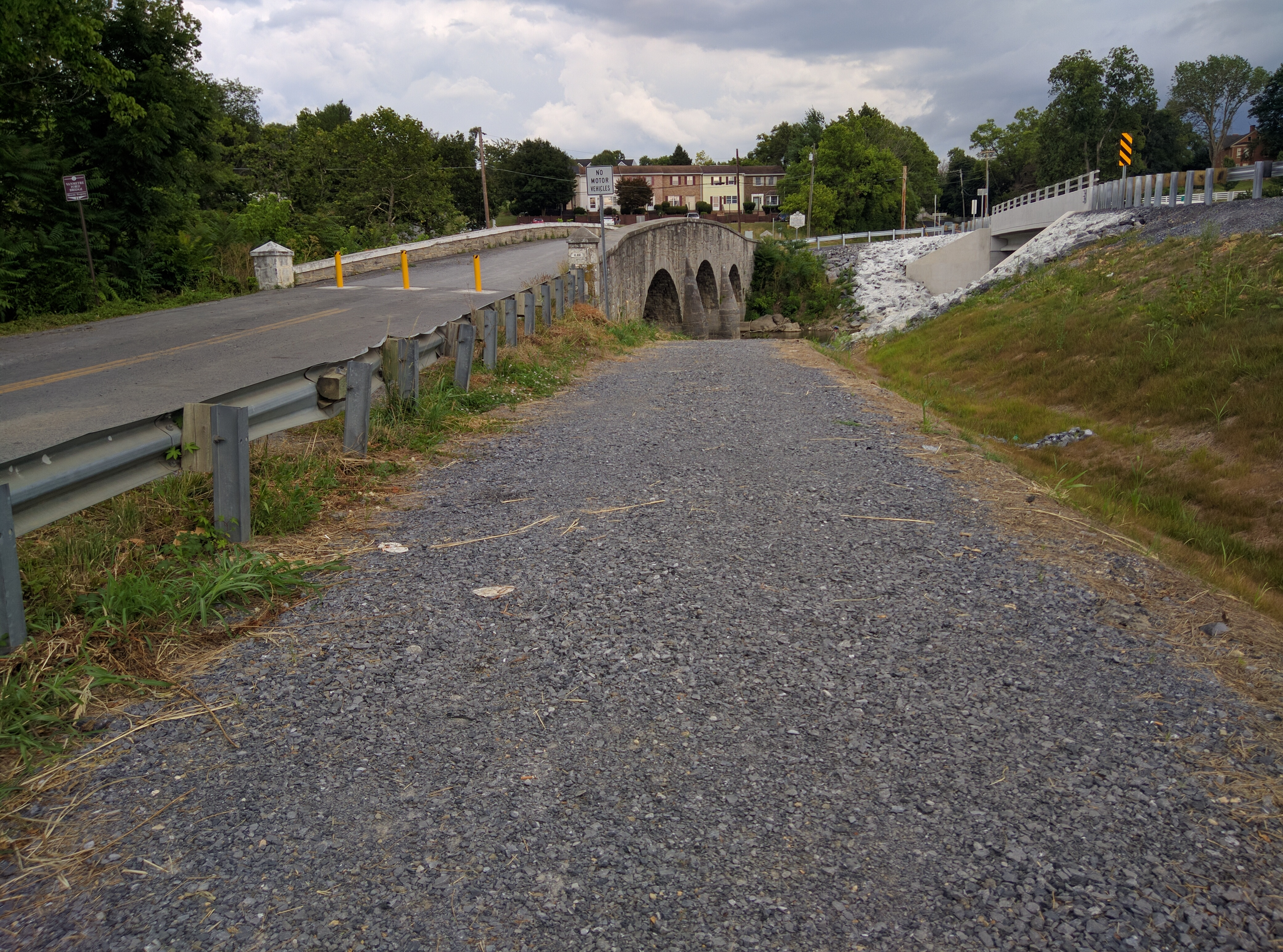
A view of Van Metre Ford Bridge from the path that leads down to Opequon Creek.

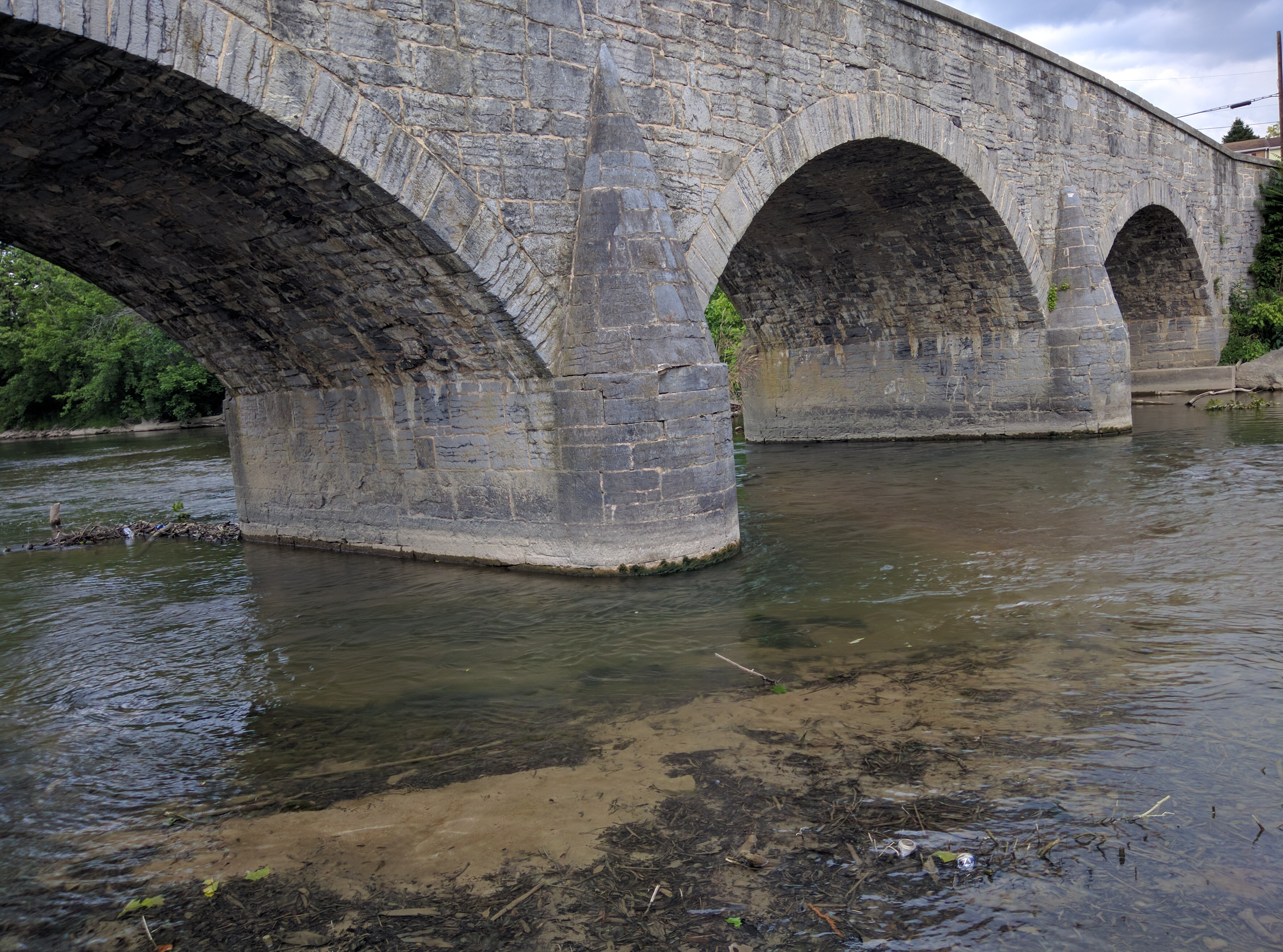
A view of Van Metre Ford Bridge from the side of Opequon Creek.

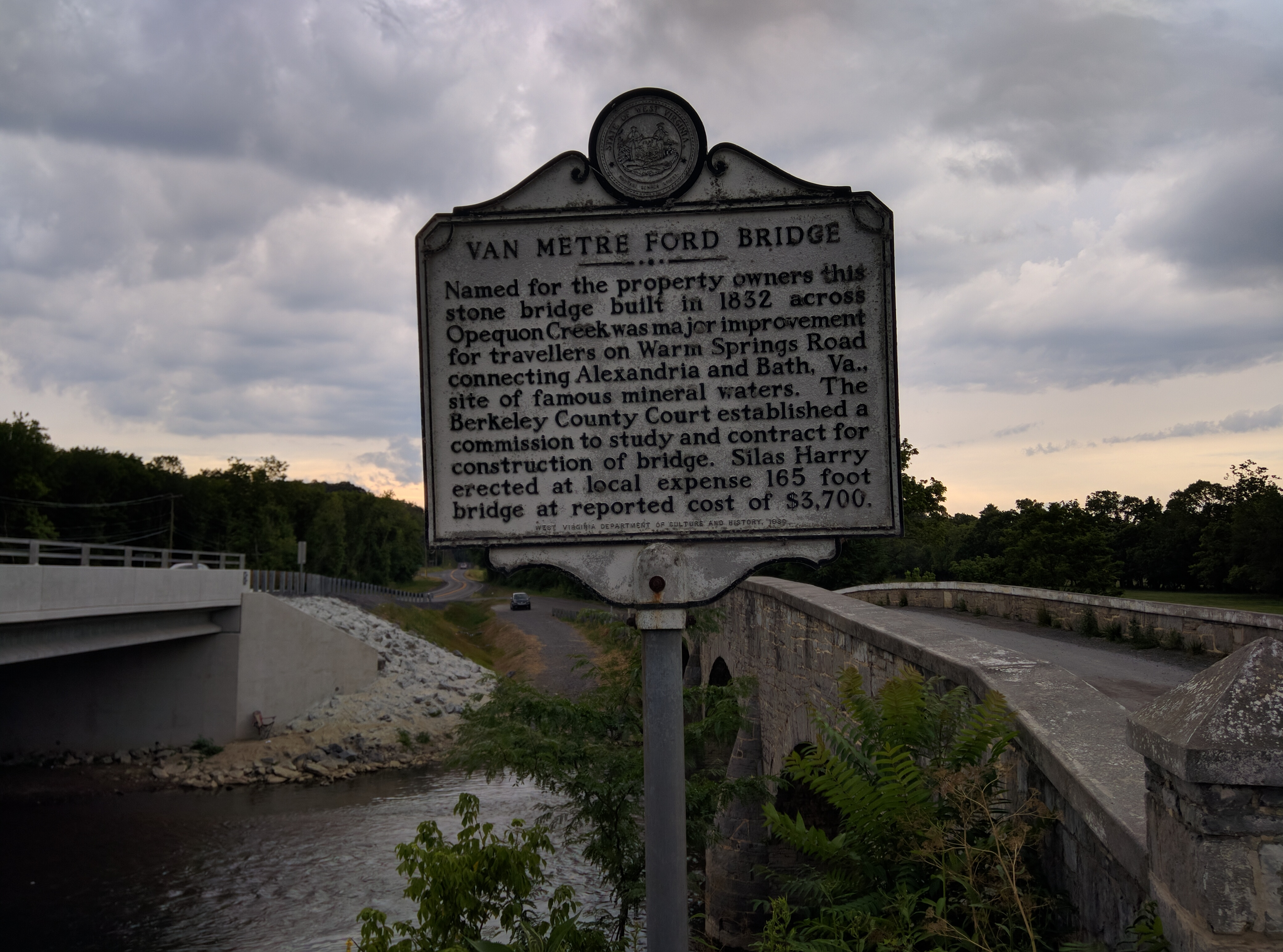
The West Virginia Department of Culture and History marker for Van Metre Ford Bridge.
