= Sand Fork (Little Kanawha River) =

- Location of the mouth of the Sand Fork in Sand Fork, West Virginia

Location
- Country: United States
- State: West Virginia
- Counties: Lewis, Gilmer

Physical characteristics
- Source
  - location: northwest of Roanoke, Lewis County
  - coordinates: 38°58′22″N 80°31′39″W
  - elevation: 1,181 ft (360 m)
- Mouth: Little Kanawha River
  - location: Sand Fork, Gilmer County
  - coordinates: 38°54′55″N 80°45′11″W
  - elevation: 732 ft (223 m)
- Length: 18.7 mi (30.1 km)
- Basin size: 80 sq mi (210 km^{2})

The Sand Fork is a tributary of the Little Kanawha River, 18.7 miles (30.1 km) long, in central West Virginia in the United States. Via the Little Kanawha and Ohio Rivers, it is part of the watershed of the Mississippi River, draining an area of 80 square miles (210 km^{2}) in a rural region on the unglaciated portion of the Allegheny Plateau.

The Sand Fork rises approximately 4 miles (6.4 km) northwest of Roanoke in Lewis County and flows west-southwestward into eastern Gilmer County, where it flows into the Little Kanawha River from the north in the town of Sand Fork.

According to the West Virginia Department of Environmental Protection, approximately 92.8% of the Sand Fork watershed is forested, mostly deciduous. Approximately 6% is used for pasture and agriculture.

The creek was named for the sand bars its contains.

== See also ==
- List of rivers of West Virginia
