= Glenville Truss Bridge =

- U.S. National Register of Historic Places
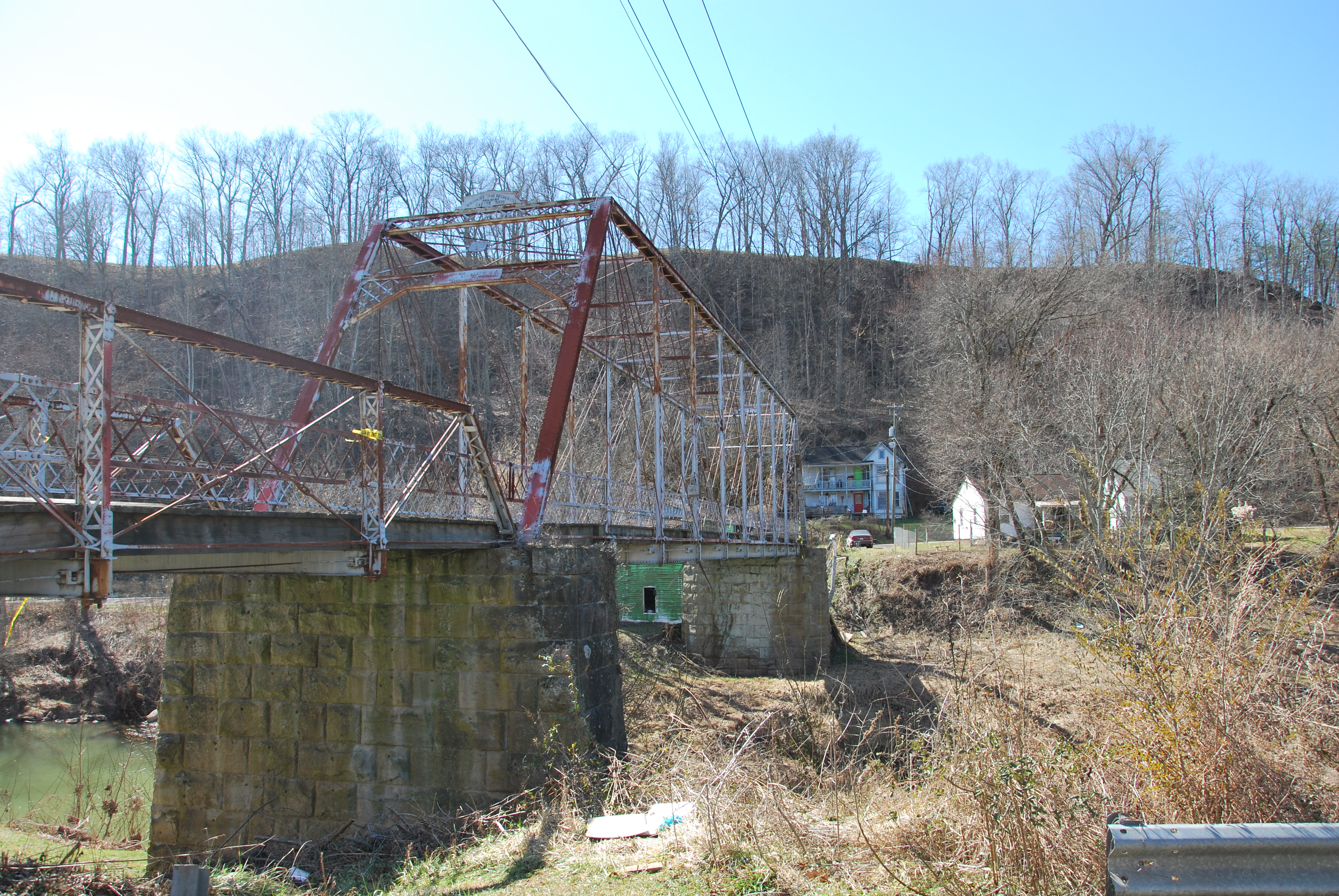
- Glenville Truss Bridge, February 2011

- Location within West Virginia Location within the United States
- Location: Conrad Court, over Little Kanawha R., Glenville, West Virginia
- Coordinates: 38°55′58″N 80°50′20″W
- Area: less than one acre
- Built: 1885
- Architect: Wrought Iron Bridge Builders; Stewart Shirreffs and Co.
- Architectural style: Pratt Through Truss
- NRHP reference No.: 98001477
- Added to NRHP: December 4, 1998

Glenville Truss Bridge is a historic Pratt Through Truss bridge that spans the Little Kanawha River at Glenville, Gilmer County, West Virginia. The bridge was built in 1885. The bridge is 240 feet, 6 inches, long and the main through truss span is 147 feet. It was designed and/or built by the Stewart, Shirreffs & Co. of Richmond, Virginia and fabricated by the Wrought Iron Bridge Builders of Canton, Ohio.

It was listed on the National Register of Historic Places in 1998.

The bridge has suffered considerable damage in recent years and is now unusable. It was barred to vehicular traffic for several decades and has now been completely blocked off since a flood washed away a part of it at the left-bank end. There is a local movement to save and restore it, and a grant has even been obtained for that purpose, but since neither the city of Glenville nor Gilmer County claims ownership (and thus responsibility), the situation is at a standstill.
