= Burnsville Bridge =

- U.S. National Register of Historic Places
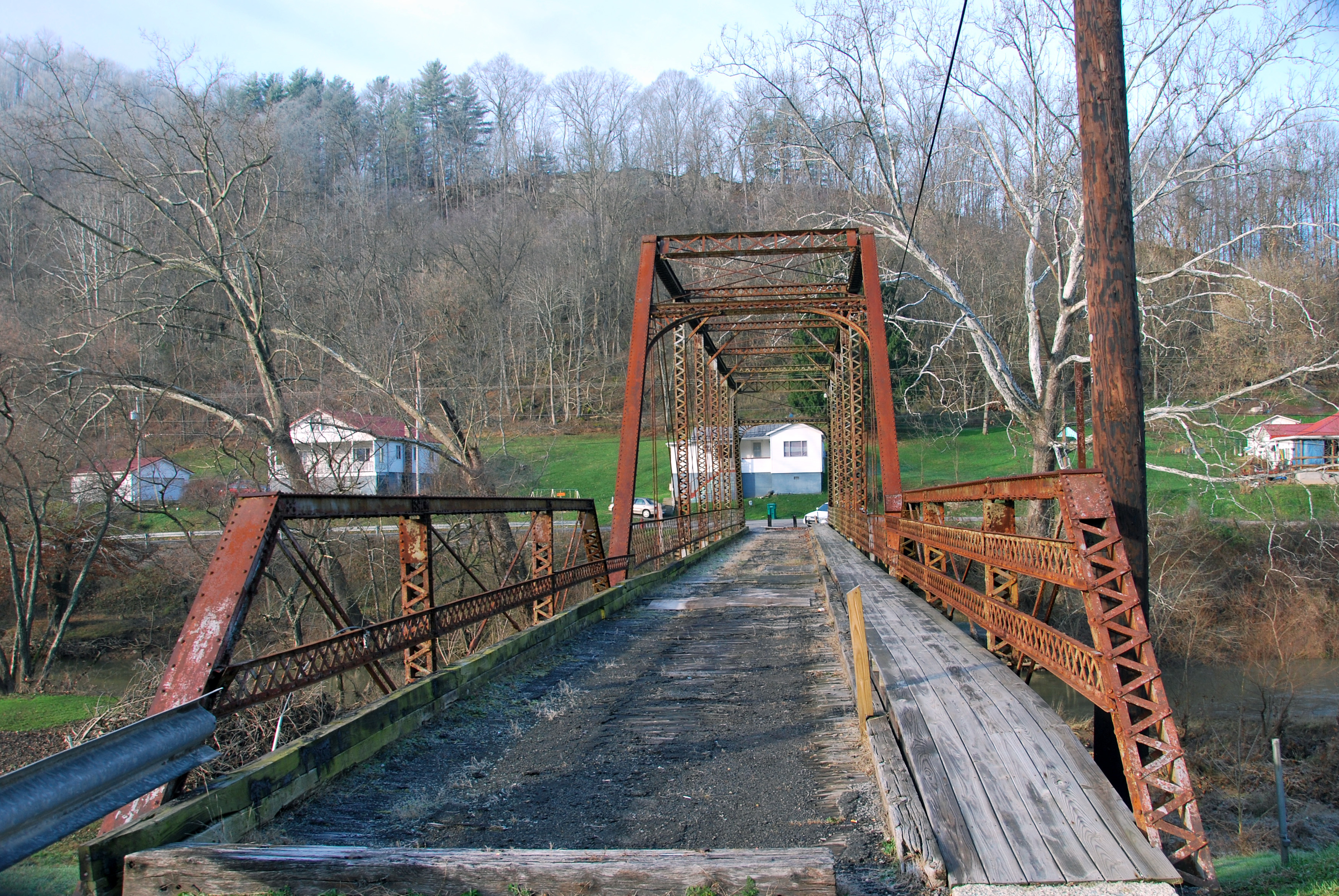
- Burnsville Bridge in December 2011

- Location within West Virginia Location within the United States
- Location: Old Bridge St. over the Little Kanawha River, Burnsville, West Virginia
- Coordinates: 38°51′19″N 80°39′25″W
- Area: less than one acre
- Built: 1893
- Architect: Variety Iron Works Company
- Architectural style: Pratt-Through Truss
- NRHP reference No.: 95000254
- Added to NRHP: March 17, 1995

Burnsville Bridge is a historic Pratt-Through Truss bridge located at Burnsville, Braxton County, West Virginia. It was built in 1893, by the Variety Iron Works Company or Cleveland, Ohio and crosses the Little Kanawha River. It consists of two Truss spans and one girder span. The three spans are 44 feet, 138 feet, 3 inches, and 23 feet, 9 inches. The structure is supported on two stone piers and a stone abutment.

It was listed on the National Register of Historic Places in 1995.
