= Fish Creek Covered Bridge =

- U.S. National Register of Historic Places
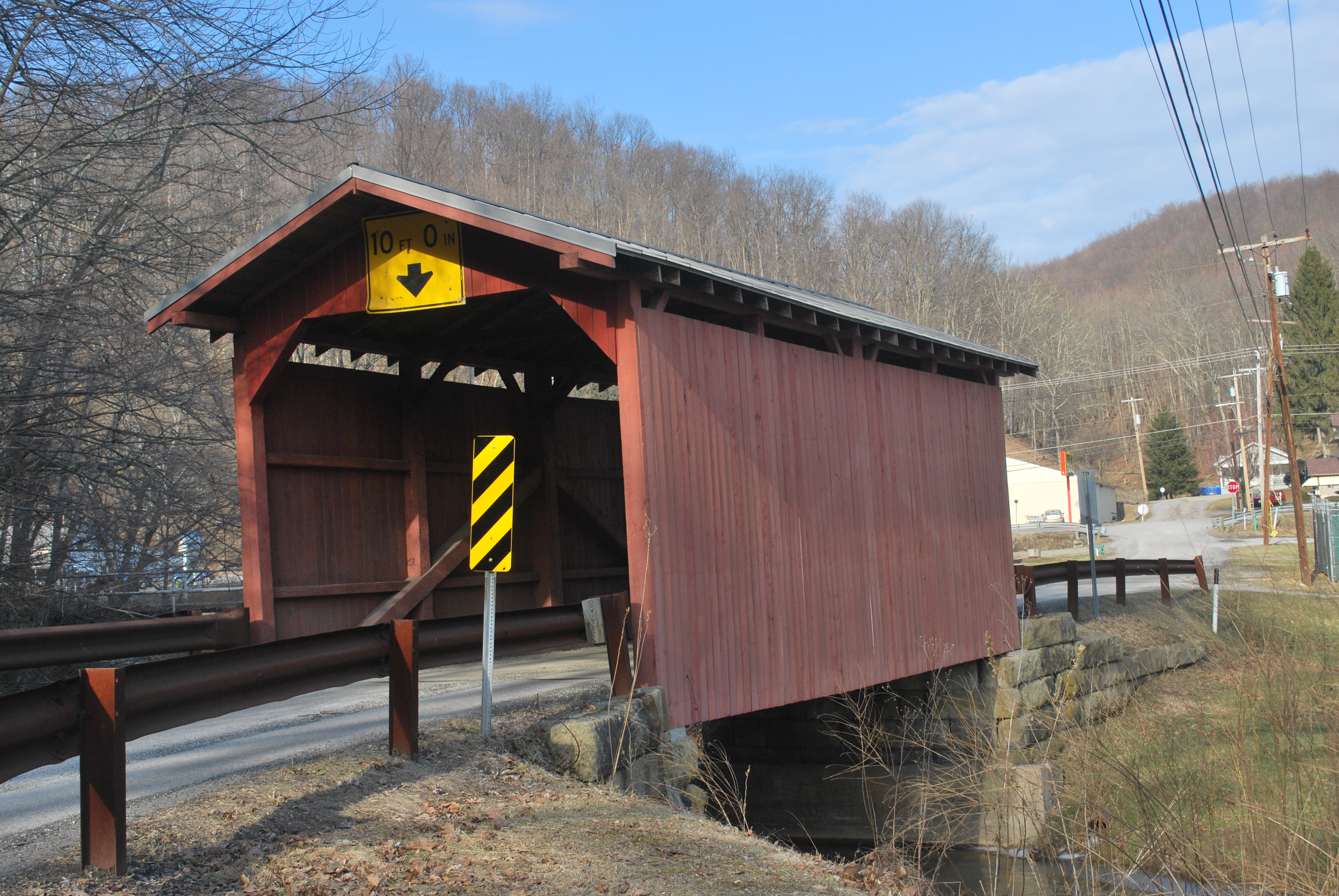

- Location within West Virginia Location within the United States
- Nearest city: Hundred, West Virginia
- Coordinates: 39°40′20″N 80°27′9″W
- Built: 1881
- Architectural style: King Post truss
- MPS: West Virginia Covered Bridges TR
- NRHP reference No.: 81000609
- Added to NRHP: June 04, 1981

The Fish Creek Covered Bridge was built circa 1881 near Hundred, West Virginia, United States. The kingpost truss bridge spans only 36 feet (11 m). It is the last remaining covered bridge in Wetzel County and one of two remaining single kingpost truss bridges in West Virginia. The bridge has been structurally reinforced with six W8x12 wide-flange steel beams replacing wood stringers. The bridge is enclosed with painted wood siding and a galvanized metal roof. It was listed on the National Register of Historic Places in 1981.

The 1881 bridge was replaced by another covered bridge in 2001.

== See also ==
- List of covered bridges in West Virginia
