= Center Point Covered Bridge =

- U.S. National Register of Historic Places
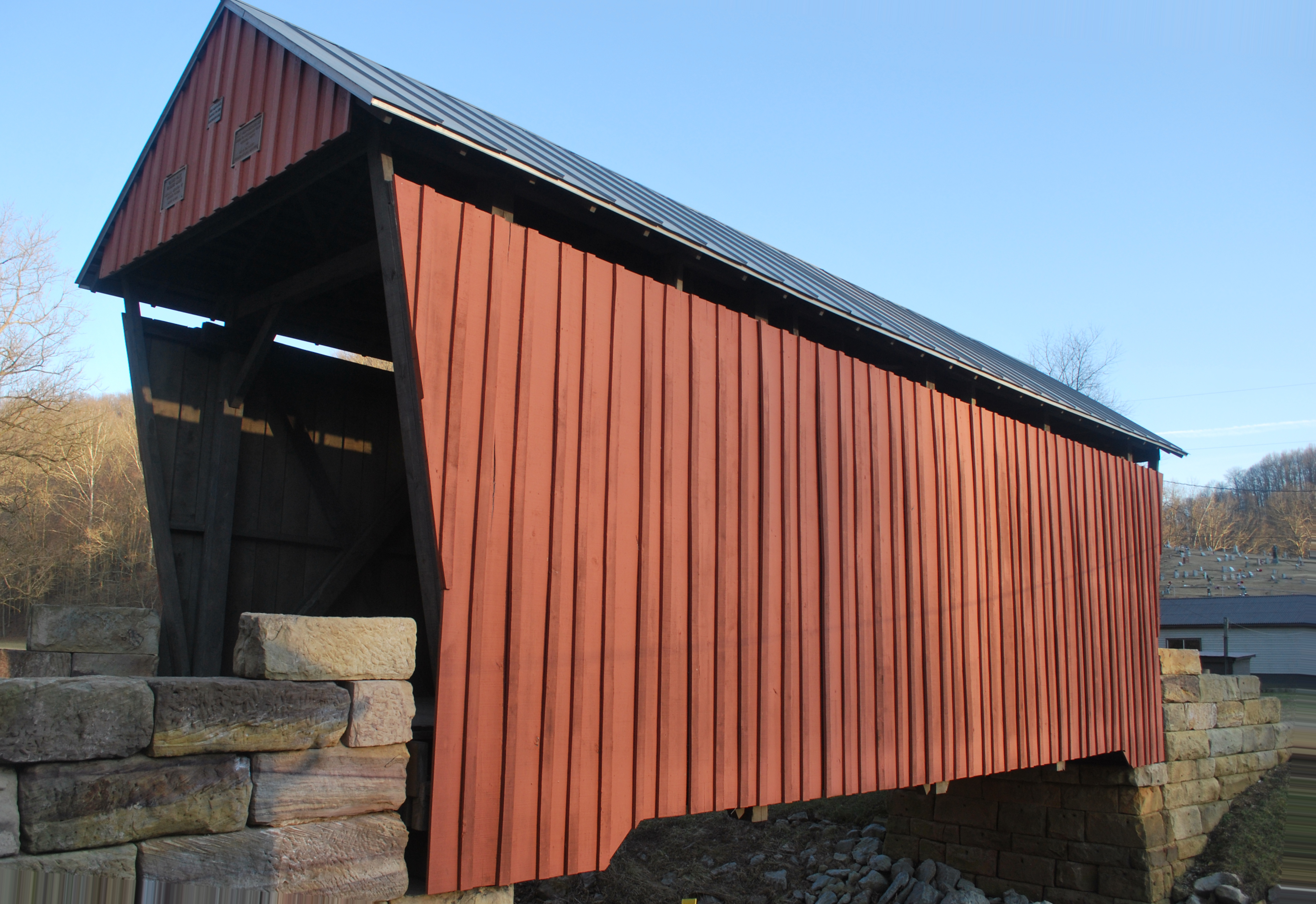
- Center Point Covered Bridge, February 2009

- Location within West Virginia Location within the United States
- Location: County Route 10 just north of WV 23, near Center Point, West Virginia
- Coordinates: 39°23′22″N 80°38′4″W
- Area: 12.5' wide X 42' long
- Architect: Based on designs of Stephen H. Long
- Architectural style: Covered bridge
- NRHP reference No.: 83003235
- Added to NRHP: August 29, 1983

The Center Point Covered Bridge is a historic covered bridge near Center Point, Doddridge County, West Virginia, United States.

It was commissioned by the County Court and was built between 1888 and 1890. It spans Pike's Fork (Middle Fork) of McElroy Creek. The masons were T.C. Ancell and E. Underwood (who charged $976.54 for all abutments). The carpenters were John Ash and S.H. Smith (who charged $230). The design utilizes the Long Truss.

As of 1983, the Center Point Covered Bridge was one of only 17 covered bridges left in West Virginia.

It was listed on the National Register of Historic Places in 1983.

== See also ==
- List of West Virginia covered bridges
