= Herns Mill Covered Bridge =

- Hern's Mill Covered Bridge
- U.S. National Register of Historic Places
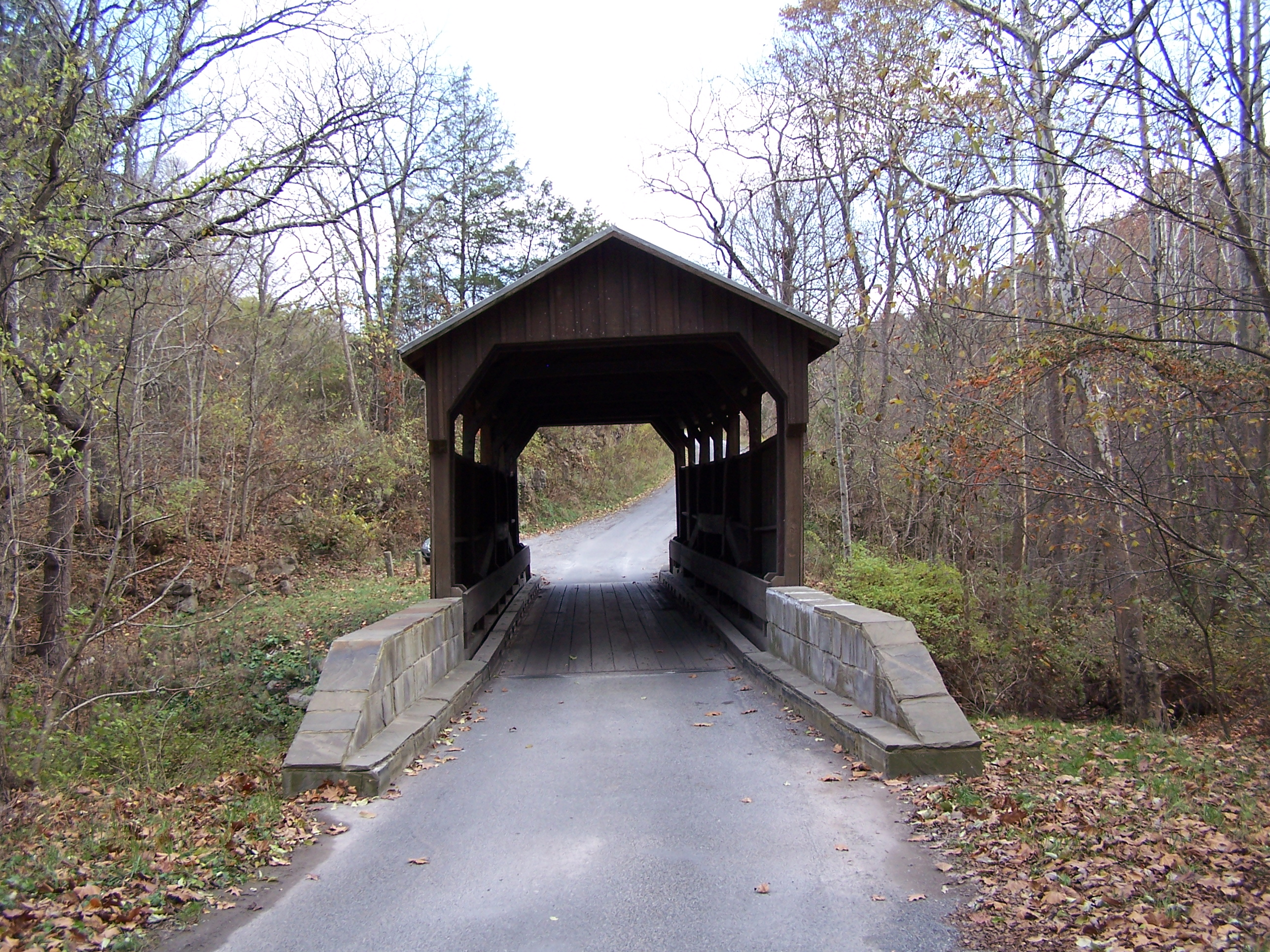
- Hern's Mill Covered Bridge, November 2007

- Location within West Virginia Location within the United States
- Location: County Route 40 near its junction with County Route 60/11, near Lewisburg, West Virginia
- Coordinates: 37°49′57″N 80°30′18″W
- Area: less than one acre
- Built: 1884
- Architectural style: Queen Post Truss
- MPS: West Virginia Covered Bridges TR
- NRHP reference No.: 81000598
- Added to NRHP: June 4, 1981

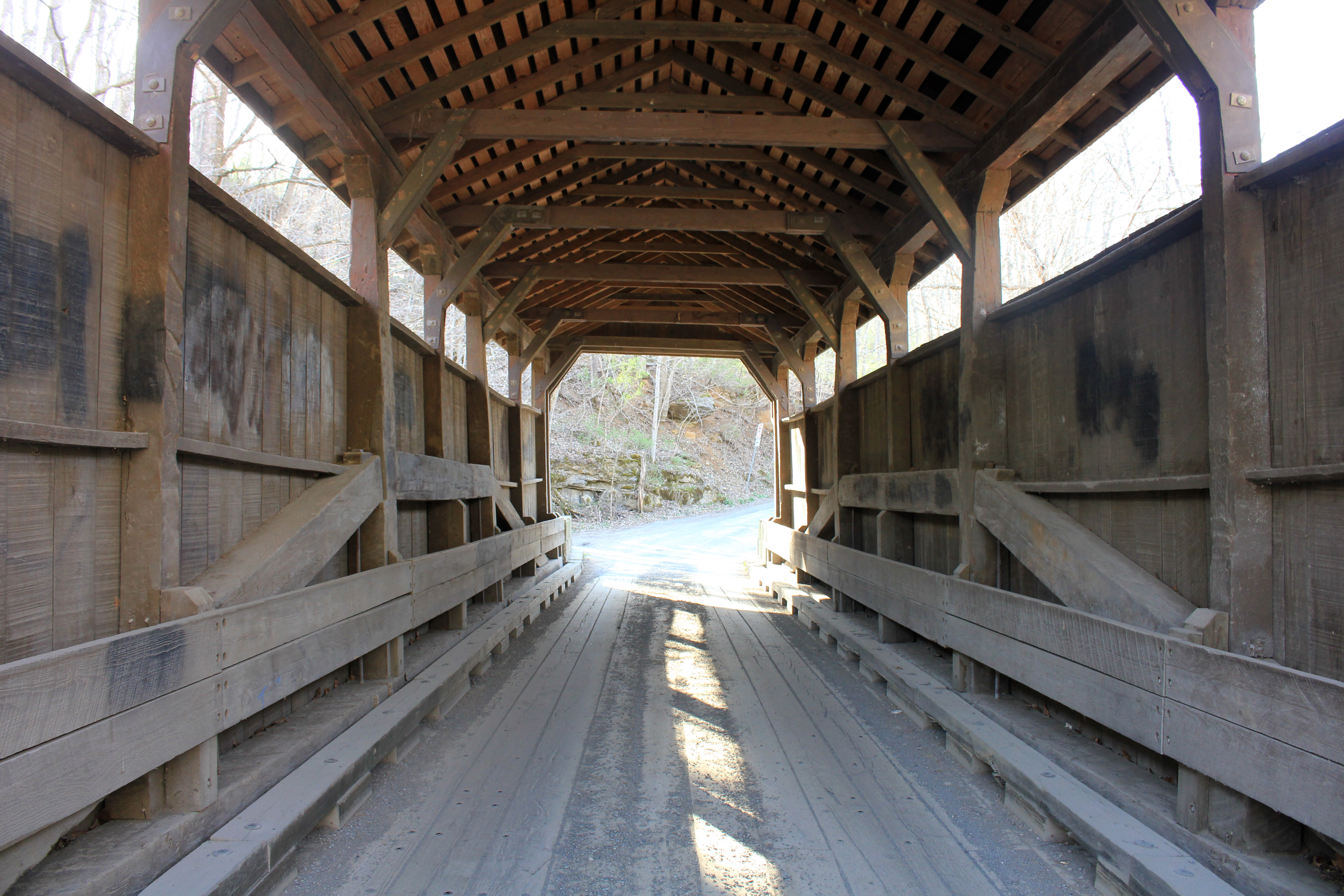
Herns Mill Covered Bridge Interior

Herns Mill Covered Bridge is a historic covered bridge near Lewisburg, Greenbrier County, West Virginia. It was built in 1884, and is a Queen post truss bridge measuring 10 feet, 6 inches wide and 53 feet, 8 inches long. It has red board-and-batten siding and a galvanized sheet metal roof. It was built to provide access to the S.S. Hern Mill, when it was in operation. It is one of two remaining covered bridges in Greenbrier County, the other being Hokes Mill Covered Bridge.

It was listed on the National Register of Historic Places in 1981.

== See also ==
- List of covered bridges in West Virginia
- List of covered bridges in the United States
