= Hokes Mill Covered Bridge =

- U.S. National Register of Historic Places
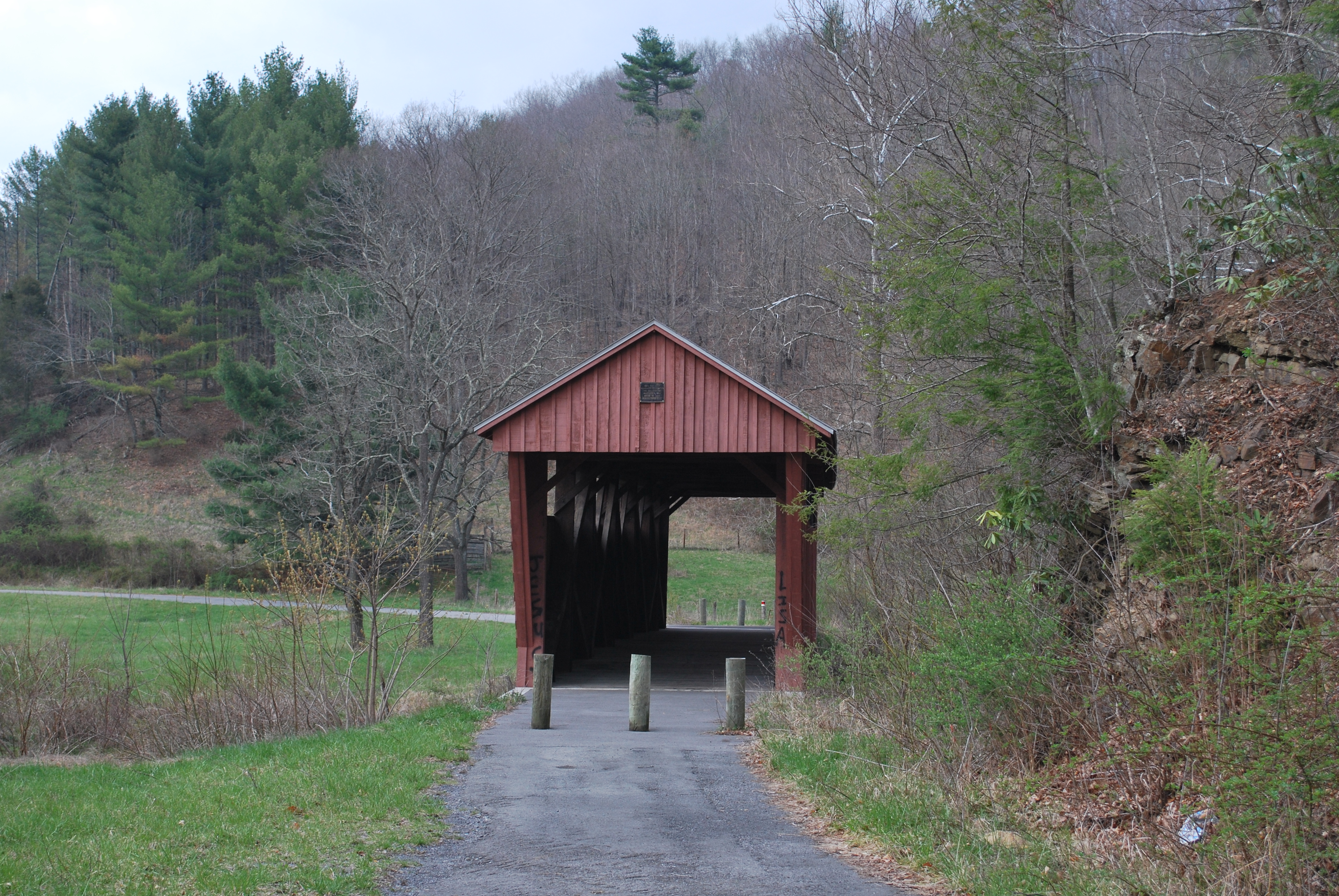
- Hokes Mill Covered Bridge, April 2009

- Location within West Virginia Location within the United States
- Location: County Route 62 at Hokes Mill crossing of Second Creek, Ronceverte, West Virginia
- Coordinates: 37°41′50″N 80°31′30″W
- Area: less than one acre
- Built: 1897–1899
- Architectural style: Long Truss
- MPS: West Virginia Covered Bridges TR
- NRHP reference No.: 81000599
- Added to NRHP: June 4, 1981

Hokes Mill Covered Bridge is a historic covered bridge at Ronceverte, Greenbrier County, West Virginia. It was built over Second Creek between 1897 and 1899, and measures 12 feet wide and 81.6 feet long. It has red board-and-batten siding and a standing seam metal roof. It is one of two remaining covered bridges in Greenbrier County, the other being Herns Mill Covered Bridge.

It was listed on the National Register of Historic Places in 1981.

== See also ==
- List of covered bridges in West Virginia
