= Simpson Creek Covered Bridge =

- U.S. National Register of Historic Places
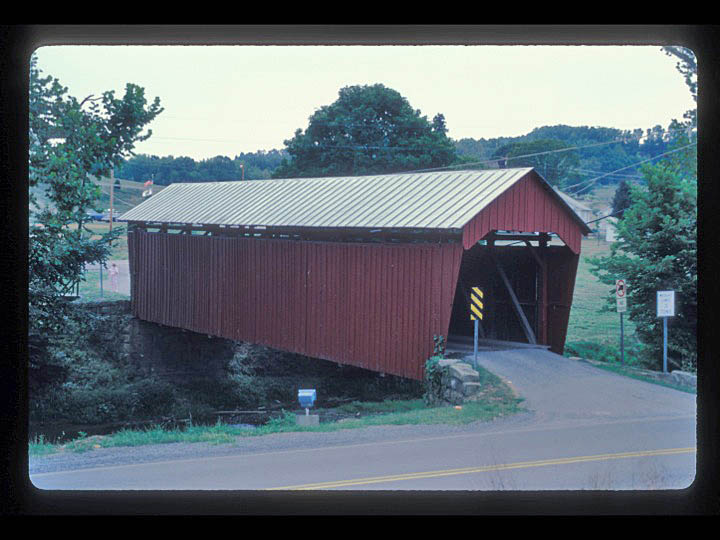
- Simpson Creek Covered Bridge

- Location within West Virginia Location within the United States
- Nearest city: Bridgeport, West Virginia
- Coordinates: 39°18′31″N 80°16′47″W
- Built: 1881
- Architect: Asa S. Hugill
- MPS: West Virginia Covered Bridges TR
- NRHP reference No.: 81000600
- Added to NRHP: June 4, 1981

Simpson Creek Covered Bridge is located in Bridgeport, West Virginia, crossing Simpson Creek off Meadowbrook Road near the entrance to the Meadowbrook Mall. The 14.25-foot-wide (4.34 m), 75-foot-long (23 m) multiple-kingpost truss bridge was built in 1881 by Asa Hugill. The current location of the bridge is not the original location. It was washed out by a flood in July 1889 and later relocated to its current location a half-mile upstream from its original spot. The Simpson Creek and Fletcher Covered Bridges, are the only two remaining covered bridges in Harrison County, are examples of this truss design.

== Upgrades ==
In fall of 2001, the West Virginia Division of Highways used nearly $400,000 to renovate the Simpson Creek Covered Bridge. The improvements include a new timber deck, wooden exterior siding and a fresh coat of paint.

== See also ==
- List of West Virginia covered bridges
