= Maken, West Virginia =

- Unincorporated community
- Location within West Virginia Location within the United States
- Coordinates: 39°17′06″N 80°29′03″W
- Country: United States
- State: West Virginia
- County: Harrison
- Elevation: 1,020 ft (310 m)
- Time zone: UTC-5 (Eastern (EST))
  - Summer (DST): UTC-4 (EDT)
- Area codes: 304 & 681
- GNIS feature ID: 1555029

Maken is an unincorporated community in Harrison County, West Virginia, United States. Maken is located at the junction of U.S. Route 50 and County Route 31, 7.5 miles (12.1 km) west of Clarksburg.
