= Truebada, West Virginia =

- Unincorporated community
- Location within West Virginia Location within the United States
- Coordinates: 38°55′48″N 80°46′39″W
- Country: United States
- State: West Virginia
- County: Gilmer
- Elevation: 728 ft (222 m)
- Time zone: UTC-5 (Eastern (EST))
  - Summer (DST): UTC-4 (EDT)
- Area codes: 304 & 681
- GNIS feature ID: 1555829

Truebada is an unincorporated community in Gilmer County, West Virginia, United States. Truebada is located on the Little Kanawha River, 3 miles (4.8 km) east of Glenville.
