= Sand Fork, West Virginia =

- Town
- Location of Sand Fork in Gilmer County, West Virginia.
- Coordinates: 38°54′49″N 80°45′00″W
- Country: United States
- State: West Virginia
- County: Gilmer

Area
  - Total: 0.35 sq mi (0.90 km^{2})
  - Land: 0.32 sq mi (0.84 km^{2})
  - Water: 0.023 sq mi (0.06 km^{2})
- Elevation: 735 ft (224 m)

Population (2020)
  - Total: 180
  - Estimate (2021): 181
  - Density: 455.7/sq mi (175.95/km^{2})
- Time zone: UTC-5 (Eastern (EST))
  - Summer (DST): UTC-4 (EDT)
- ZIP code: 26430
- Area code: 304
- FIPS code: 54-71620
- GNIS feature ID: 1546345

Sand Fork is a town in Gilmer County, West Virginia, United States. The population was 182 at the 2020 census. It is located along the Little Kanawha River, at the mouth of the Sand Fork.

Sand Fork was incorporated in 1903 as Layopolis, named for William R. Lay, an employee of the Eureka Pipe Line Company, which operated in oil fields in the area. Prior to 1983, the town was known as Layopolis, while its post office was known as Sand Fork. The town's name was changed to Sand Fork by the results of an election in 1983.

== Geography ==
Sand Fork is located at 38°54′49″N 80°45′00″W (38.913684, -80.749976).

According to the United States Census Bureau, the town has a total area of 0.35 square miles (0.91 km^{2}), of which 0.33 square miles (0.85 km^{2}) is land and 0.02 square miles (0.05 km^{2}) is water.

== Demographics ==
Historical population
Census	Pop.	Note	%±
1970	252		—
1980	280		11.1%
1990	196		−30.0%
2000	176		−10.2%
2010	159		−9.7%
2020	180		13.2%
2021 (est.)	181	▲	0.6%
U.S. Decennial Census

=== 2010 census ===
As of the census of 2010, there were 159 people, 60 households, and 45 families living in the town. The population density was 481.8 inhabitants per square mile (186.0/km^{2}). There were 68 housing units at an average density of 206.1 per square mile (79.6/km^{2}). The racial makeup of the town was 98.1% White and 1.9% from two or more races.

There were 60 households, of which 43.3% had children under the age of 18 living with them, 56.7% were married couples living together, 15.0% had a female householder with no husband present, 3.3% had a male householder with no wife present, and 25.0% were non-families. 25.0% of all households were made up of individuals, and 15% had someone living alone who was 65 years of age or older. The average household size was 2.65 and the average family size was 3.16.

The median age in the town was 35.5 years. 29.6% of residents were under the age of 18; 5.6% were between the ages of 18 and 24; 25.2% were from 25 to 44; 23.9% were from 45 to 64; and 15.7% were 65 years of age or older. The gender makeup of the town was 44.0% male and 56.0% female.

=== 2000 census ===
As of the census of 2000, there were 176 people, 68 households, and 51 families living in the town. The population density was 501.1 inhabitants per square mile (194.2/km^{2}). There were 82 housing units at an average density of 233.5 per square mile (90.5/km^{2}). The racial makeup of the town was 98.30% White, and 1.70% from two or more races.

There were 68 households, out of which 32.4% had children under the age of 18 living with them, 60.3% were married couples living together, 10.3% had a female householder with no husband present, and 25.0% were non-families. 23.5% of all households were made up of individuals, and 19.1% had someone living alone who was 65 years of age or older. The average household size was 2.59 and the average family size was 2.96.

In the town, the population was spread out, with 23.9% under the age of 18, 8.0% from 18 to 24, 25.6% from 25 to 44, 26.1% from 45 to 64, and 16.5% who were 65 years of age or older. The median age was 39 years. For every 100 females, there were 93.4 males. For every 100 females age 18 and over, there were 91.4 males.

The median income for a household in the town was $30,179, and the median income for a family was $33,750. Males had a median income of $23,750 versus $24,167 for females. The per capita income for the town was $14,223. About 17.2% of families and 21.2% of the population were below the poverty line, including 21.4% of those under the age of eighteen and 26.1% of those 65 or over.

== Points of interest ==
This small town has several interesting features. There is an early historic general store, several churches, an elementary school and a number of businesses. There is a trail head located near the town of Sandfork for an extensive set of unnamed off-road vehicle (ORV) trails. These trails are located on private land but access is unrestricted. The trail system is best suited to small vehicles but some trails are accessible by full-size ORVs.
