= Center Point, West Virginia =

Unincorporated community in West Virginia, United States

- Unincorporated community
- Location within the state of West Virginia Center; Point (the United States)
- Coordinates: 39°23′30″N 80°38′7″W
- Country: United States
- State: West Virginia
- County: Doddridge
- Time zone: UTC-5 (Eastern (EST))
  - Summer (DST): UTC-4 (EDT)
- ZIP codes: 26339

Center Point is an unincorporated community in northeastern Doddridge County, West Virginia, United States. It lies along Route 23 northeast of the town of West Union, the county seat of Doddridge County. Its elevation is 791 feet (241 m).

Historically, the community has also been known as Three Forks of McElroy (or Three Fork), Centerpoint, Centre Point, and Mount Pleasant; the Board on Geographic Names officially designated the current name and spelling in 1964. it had a post office until November 2, 2002, and still has a ZIP code 26339. It lies near the confluence of three streams that form McElroy Creek (Robinson, Pike, and Talkington Forks).

Located near Center Point is the Center Point Covered Bridge (built ca. 1888–90), listed on the National Register of Historic Places in 1983.

The first oil pool in Doddridge County was discovered ("brought in" as it was then termed) and drilled in 1892 at Center Point. The oil and gas industry transformed life in the area very quickly and permanently.
