= Locust Creek Covered Bridge (West Virginia) =

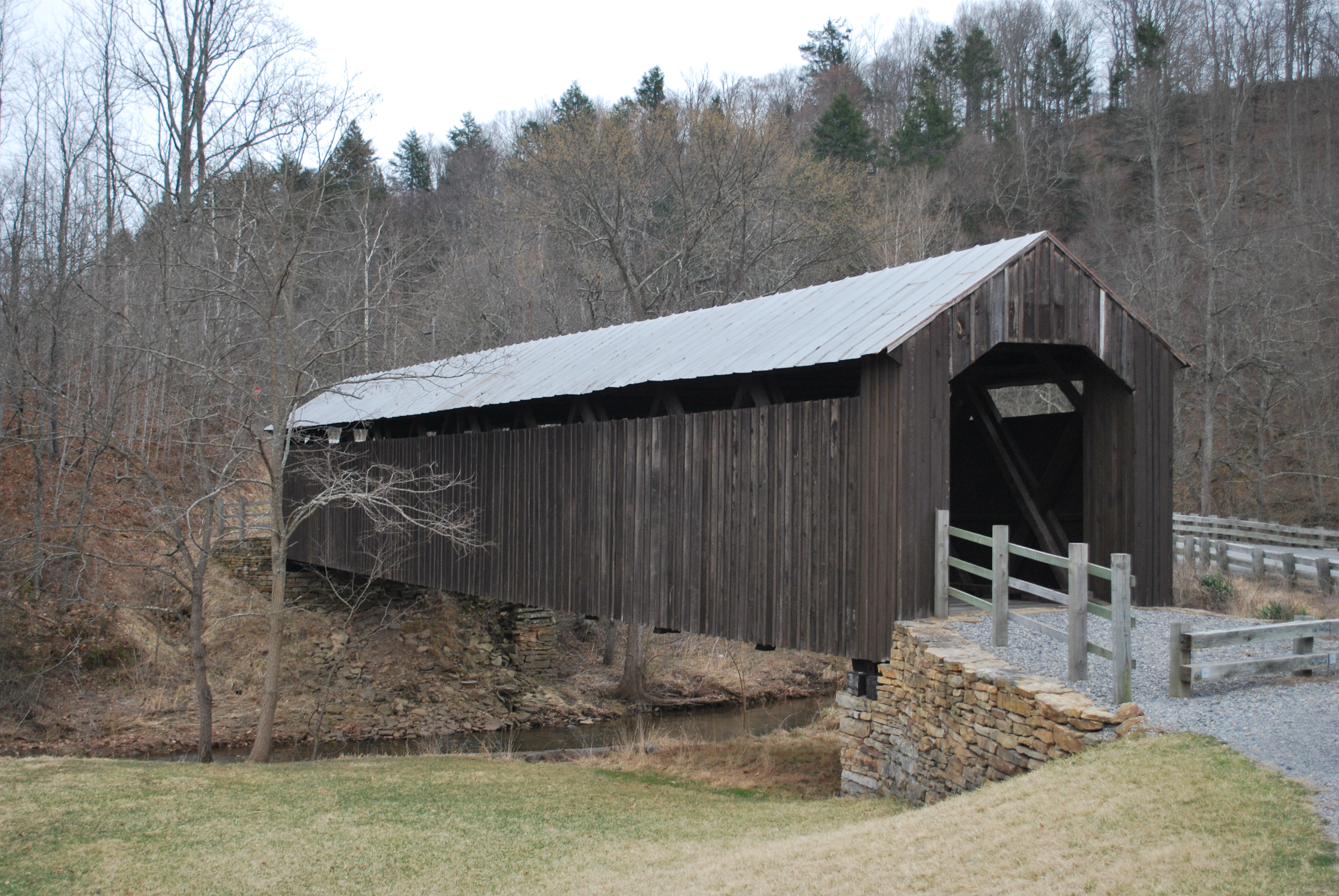
- View of the bridge's upstream side.
- Coordinates: 38°4′46″N 80°15′1″W
- Carries: pedestrians
- Crosses: Locust Creek
- Locale: near Hillsboro, West Virginia
- Maintained by: West Virginia Division of Highways

Characteristics
- Total length: 114 ft (35 m)
- Width: 13.5 ft (4.1 m)

History
- Construction start: 1870
- Construction end: 1870
- Locust Creek Covered Bridge
- U.S. National Register of Historic Places
- MPS: West Virginia Covered Bridges TR
- NRHP reference No.: 81000607
- Added to NRHP: June 4, 1981

Location
- Interactive map of Locust Creek Covered Bridge

The Locust Creek Covered Bridge is the only remaining covered bridge in Pocahontas County, West Virginia. It is located approximately 6 miles (9.7 km) outside Hillsboro. The bridge is now for pedestrian traffic only.

== History ==
R. N. Bruce was contracted in 1870 to build the wooden covered bridge for US$1,250. The Warren Double Intersection truss covered bridge was completed later that year. The span over Locust Creek was 13.5 feet (4.1 m) wide and 114 feet (35 m) long.

In 1888, the original bridge was burned and replaced. In 1904 it was rebuilt again by W. M. Irvine. Interior supports, trusses, side paneling and roof were replaced during the reconstruction. In 1968, the bridge was painted and new oak floor was installed. Temporary supports used during the floor replacement were left in place.

The bridge was added to the National Register of Historic Places in 1981

In 1990, the state of West Virginia bypassed the covered bridge with a modern concrete span.

In 2002, the covered bridge was renovated into a pedestrian crossing and the temporary supports were removed.

== See also ==
- List of West Virginia covered bridges
