= Carrollton, West Virginia =

Unincorporated community in West Virginia, United States

Carrollton
- Unincorporated community
- Location within the state of West Virginia Carrollton (the United States)
- Coordinates: 39°5′25″N 80°5′13″W
- Country: United States
- State: West Virginia
- County: Barbour
- Elevation: 1,358 ft (414 m)
- Time zone: UTC-5 (Eastern (EST))
  - Summer (DST): UTC-4 (EDT)
- GNIS feature ID: 1549621

Carrollton is an unincorporated community in Barbour County, in the U.S. state of West Virginia. Carrollton is known for its Carrollton Covered Bridge over the Buckhannon River, listed on the National Register of Historic Places.
