= Laurel Point, West Virginia =

Laurel Point
- Unincorporated community
- Location within the state of West Virginia Laurel Point (the United States)
- Coordinates: 39°37′9″N 80°0′29″W
- Country: United States
- State: West Virginia
- County: Monongalia
- Elevation: 988 ft (301 m)
- Time zone: UTC-5 (Eastern (EST))
  - Summer (DST): UTC-4 (EDT)
- GNIS ID: 1554919

Laurel Point is an unincorporated community in Monongalia County, West Virginia, United States.
