= Walkersville, West Virginia =

- Unincorporated community
- Location within West Virginia Location within the United States
- Coordinates: 38°52′10″N 80°27′24″W
- Country: United States
- State: West Virginia
- County: Lewis
- Elevation: 1,109 ft (338 m)
- Time zone: UTC-5 (Eastern (EST))
  - Summer (DST): UTC-4 (EDT)
- ZIP code: 26447
- Area codes: 304 & 681
- GNIS feature ID: 1548732

Walkersville is an unincorporated community in Lewis County, West Virginia, United States. Walkersville is 11.5 miles (18.5 km) south of Weston. Walkersville has a post office with ZIP code 26447.

There are several accounts regarding the origin of the name Walkersville.
