= Lillydale, Monroe County, West Virginia =

Lillydale, West Virginia
- Unincorporated community
- Location within West Virginia Location within the United States
- Coordinates: 37°33′24″N 80°36′37″W
- Country: United States
- State: West Virginia
- County: Monroe
- Elevation: 1,785 ft (544 m)
- Time zone: UTC-5 (Eastern (EST))
  - Summer (DST): UTC-4 (EDT)
- Area codes: 304 & 681
- GNIS feature ID: 1549785

Lillydale is an unincorporated community in Monroe County, West Virginia, United States. Lillydale is southwest of Union.
