= Sandyville, West Virginia =

- Unincorporated community
- Location within West Virginia Location within the United States
- Coordinates: 38°54′21″N 81°39′38″W
- Country: United States
- State: West Virginia
- County: Jackson
- Time zone: UTC-5 (Eastern (EST))
  - Summer (DST): UTC-4 (EDT)
- ZIP codes: 25275

Sandyville is an unincorporated community in north central Jackson County, West Virginia, United States. It lies close to the left fork of Sandy Creek, nestled in the hills between Ravenswood and Ripley. It has a population of 1,721 and an average household income of $41,122.

The community was named after nearby Sandy Creek. Sandyville is the location of former Gilmore High School. And is still the current home of Gilmore Elementary (grades K-5)

== Climate ==
The climate in this area is characterized by hot, humid summers and generally mild to cool winters. According to the Köppen Climate Classification system, Sandyville has a humid subtropical climate, abbreviated "Cfa" on climate maps.
