= National Register of Historic Places listings in Gilmer County, West Virginia =

Location of Gilmer County in West Virginia

This is a list of the National Register of Historic Places listings in Gilmer County, West Virginia.

This is intended to be a complete list of the properties and districts on the National Register of Historic Places in Gilmer County, West Virginia, United States. The locations of National Register properties and districts for which the latitude and longitude coordinates are included below, may be seen in a Google map.

There are 10 properties listed on the National Register in the county.

This National Park Service list is complete through NPS recent listings posted March 21, 2025.

Contents: Counties in West Virginia

Barbour - Berkeley - Boone - Braxton - Brooke - Cabell - Calhoun - Clay - Doddridge - Fayette - Gilmer - Grant - Greenbrier - Hampshire - Hancock - Hardy - Harrison - Jackson - Jefferson - Kanawha - Lewis - Lincoln - Logan - Marion - Marshall - Mason - McDowell - Mercer - Mineral - Mingo - Monongalia - Monroe - Morgan - Nicholas - Ohio - Pendleton - Pleasants - Pocahontas - Preston - Putnam - Raleigh - Randolph - Ritchie - Roane - Summers - Taylor - Tucker - Tyler - Upshur - Wayne - Webster - Wetzel - Wirt - Wood - Wyoming

== Current listings ==
	Name on the Register	Image	Date listed	Location	City or town	Description
1	John E. Arbuckle House	John E. Arbuckle House	November 21, 1991 (#91001729)	213 Court St. 38°56′06″N 80°50′07″W	Glenville	
2	Cedarville School	Cedarville School	March 25, 1994 (#94000210)	Junction of Smith Ave. and Edmond St. 38°50′25″N 80°49′08″W	Cedarville	
3	Duck Run Cable Suspension Bridge	Duck Run Cable Suspension Bridge	July 9, 1997 (#97000783)	Over the Little Kanawha River south of the junction of WV 5 and County Route 30; 38°55′42″N 80°47′14″W	Trubada	
4	Gilmer County Poor Farm Infirmary	Gilmer County Poor Farm Infirmary	December 4, 1998 (#98001465)	Off Sycamore Rd. on Recreation Center Rd. 38°57′08″N 80°49′46″W	Glenville vicinity	
5	Glenville Truss Bridge	Glenville Truss Bridge	December 4, 1998 (#98001477)	Conrad Court over the Little Kanawha River; 38°55′57″N 80°50′20″W	Glenville	
6	Job's Temple	Job's Temple	May 29, 1979 (#79002575)	West of Glenville on WV 5; 38°55′56″N 80°57′45″W	Glenville vicinity	
7	Little Kanawha Valley Bank	Little Kanawha Valley Bank	August 5, 1991 (#91001012)	5 Howard St. 38°56′02″N 80°50′11″W	Glenville	
8	Ruddell General Store	Ruddell General Store	December 15, 1998 (#98001469)	6 N. Court St. 38°56′02″N 80°50′13″W	Glenville	
9	Stouts Mill Bridge	Stouts Mill Bridge	December 4, 1998 (#98001476)	Duskcamp Rd., over the Little Kanawha River; 38°53′46″N 80°43′54″W	Stouts Mill	
10	Whiting House	Whiting House	December 4, 1998 (#98001480)	301 E. Main St. 38°55′57″N 80°50′10″W	Glenville	

== See also ==
- List of National Historic Landmarks in West Virginia
- National Register of Historic Places listings in West Virginia
