= National Register of Historic Places listings in Upshur County, West Virginia =

Location of Upshur County in West Virginia

This is a list of the National Register of Historic Places listings in Upshur County, West Virginia.

This is intended to be a complete list of the properties and districts on the National Register of Historic Places in Upshur County, West Virginia, United States. The locations of National Register properties and districts for which the latitude and longitude coordinates are included below, may be seen in a Google map.

There are 7 properties and districts listed on the National Register in the county.

This National Park Service list is complete through NPS recent listings posted March 21, 2025.

Contents: Counties in West Virginia

Barbour - Berkeley - Boone - Braxton - Brooke - Cabell - Calhoun - Clay - Doddridge - Fayette - Gilmer - Grant - Greenbrier - Hampshire - Hancock - Hardy - Harrison - Jackson - Jefferson - Kanawha - Lewis - Lincoln - Logan - Marion - Marshall - Mason - McDowell - Mercer - Mineral - Mingo - Monongalia - Monroe - Morgan - Nicholas - Ohio - Pendleton - Pleasants - Pocahontas - Preston - Putnam - Raleigh - Randolph - Ritchie - Roane - Summers - Taylor - Tucker - Tyler - Upshur - Wayne - Webster - Wetzel - Wirt - Wood - Wyoming

== Current listings ==
	Name on the Register	Image	Date listed	Location	City or town	Description
1	Agnes Howard Hall	Agnes Howard Hall	August 18, 1983 (#83003253)	West Virginia Wesleyan College campus 38°59′22″N 80°13′13″W	Buckhannon	
2	Buckhannon Central Residential Historical District	Buckhannon Central Residential Historical District	April 16, 2012 (#12000225)	Roughly bounded by College Ave., S. Kanawha, Madison, & E. Main Sts. 38°59′24″N 80°13′35″W	Buckhannon	
3	Downtown Buckhannon Historic District	Downtown Buckhannon Historic District	December 30, 2009 (#09001196)	Portions of E. and W. Main, N. and S. Florida, Locust, N. and S. Kanawha, and Spring Sts. 38°59′39″N 80°13′48″W	Buckhannon	
4	Fidler's Mill	Fidler's Mill	November 24, 1997 (#97001414)	Heaston Ridge Rd. 38°47′58″N 80°20′48″W	Arlington	
5	French Creek Presbyterian Church	French Creek Presbyterian Church	December 24, 1974 (#74002020)	Rte. 2; 38°53′06″N 80°18′07″W	French Creek	
6	William Post Mansion	William Post Mansion	July 13, 1993 (#93000619)	8 Island Ave. 38°59′45″N 80°13′36″W	Buckhannon	
7	Southern Methodist Church Building	Southern Methodist Church Building	July 29, 1992 (#92000898)	81 W. Main St. 38°59′36″N 80°14′01″W	Buckhannon	

== See also ==
- List of National Historic Landmarks in West Virginia
- National Register of Historic Places listings in West Virginia
