= National Register of Historic Places listings in Wetzel County, West Virginia =

Location of Wetzel County in West Virginia

This is a list of the National Register of Historic Places listings in Wetzel County, West Virginia.

This is intended to be a complete list of the properties and districts on the National Register of Historic Places in Wetzel County, West Virginia, United States. The locations of National Register properties and districts for which the latitude and longitude coordinates are included below, may be seen in a Google map.

There are 4 properties and districts listed on the National Register in the county.

This National Park Service list is complete through NPS recent listings posted March 21, 2025.

Contents: Counties in West Virginia

Barbour - Berkeley - Boone - Braxton - Brooke - Cabell - Calhoun - Clay - Doddridge - Fayette - Gilmer - Grant - Greenbrier - Hampshire - Hancock - Hardy - Harrison - Jackson - Jefferson - Kanawha - Lewis - Lincoln - Logan - Marion - Marshall - Mason - McDowell - Mercer - Mineral - Mingo - Monongalia - Monroe - Morgan - Nicholas - Ohio - Pendleton - Pleasants - Pocahontas - Preston - Putnam - Raleigh - Randolph - Ritchie - Roane - Summers - Taylor - Tucker - Tyler - Upshur - Wayne - Webster - Wetzel - Wirt - Wood - Wyoming

== Current listings ==
	Name on the Register	Image	Date listed	Location	City or town	Description
1	Fish Creek Covered Bridge	Fish Creek Covered Bridge	June 4, 1981 (#81000609)	County Route 13 just west of US 250/WV 7; 39°40′20″N 80°27′09″W	Hundred	
2	New Martinsville Downtown Historic District	New Martinsville Downtown Historic District	September 23, 1988 (#88000675)	Main and Washington Sts. and Monroe Alley; 39°38′28″N 80°51′16″W	New Martinsville	
3	North Street Historic District	North Street Historic District	June 7, 1988 (#88000677)	North St. between Florida and the railroad tracks 39°38′33″N 80°51′42″W	New Martinsville	
4	War Memorial Building	War Memorial Building	July 9, 1997 (#97000787)	501 N. Main St. 39°38′42″N 80°51′52″W	New Martinsville	

== See also ==
- List of National Historic Landmarks in West Virginia
- National Register of Historic Places listings in West Virginia
