= National Register of Historic Places listings in Jackson County, West Virginia =

Location of Jackson County in West Virginia

This is a list of the National Register of Historic Places listings in Jackson County, West Virginia.

This is intended to be a complete list of the properties and districts on the National Register of Historic Places in Jackson County, West Virginia, United States. The locations of National Register properties and districts for which the latitude and longitude coordinates are included below, may be seen in an online map.

There are 11 properties and districts listed on the National Register in the county. Another property was once listed but has been removed.

This National Park Service list is complete through NPS recent listings posted January 2, 2026.

Contents: Counties in West Virginia

Barbour - Berkeley - Boone - Braxton - Brooke - Cabell - Calhoun - Clay - Doddridge - Fayette - Gilmer - Grant - Greenbrier - Hampshire - Hancock - Hardy - Harrison - Jackson - Jefferson - Kanawha - Lewis - Lincoln - Logan - Marion - Marshall - Mason - McDowell - Mercer - Mineral - Mingo - Monongalia - Monroe - Morgan - Nicholas - Ohio - Pendleton - Pleasants - Pocahontas - Preston - Putnam - Raleigh - Randolph - Ritchie - Roane - Summers - Taylor - Tucker - Tyler - Upshur - Wayne - Webster - Wetzel - Wirt - Wood - Wyoming

== Current listings ==
	Name on the Register	Image	Date listed	Location	City or town	Description
1	Armstrong House	Armstrong House	February 12, 1980 (#80004023)	315 North St. 38°49′12″N 81°42′51″W	Ripley	
2	Clerc-Carson House	Clerc-Carson House	October 29, 1992 (#92001482)	121 North St. 38°49′10″N 81°42′31″W	Ripley	
3	Faber Double-Crib Barn	Faber Double-Crib Barn	September 7, 2005 (#05001007)	1106 County Route 21; 38°37′14″N 81°39′57″W	Kenna	
4	Hutchinson-Parsons-Fulk Mail Pouch Barn		January 8, 2026 (#100012517)	8881 Parkersburg Road; 38°55′45″N 81°38′43″W	Sandyville vicinity	
5	Lemley-Wood-Sayer House	Lemley-Wood-Sayer House	October 30, 1985 (#85003409)	301 Walnut St. 38°56′55″N 81°45′36″W	Ravenswood	
6	Otterbein Church	Otterbein Church	April 1, 1998 (#98000286)	County Route 87/11, near junction with County Route 5; 38°49′54″N 81°47′36″W	Evans	
7	Rankin Octagonal Barn	Rankin Octagonal Barn	July 9, 1985 (#85001551)	County Route 3; 38°56′45″N 81°41′44″W	Silverton	
8	Ravenswood "Old Town" Historic District	Ravenswood "Old Town" Historic District	March 23, 2007 (#07000243)	Bounded by Sandy Creek, the Ohio River, Sycamore St., and adjoining properties and the city limits to the east 38°56′53″N 81°45′39″W	Ravenswood	
9	Ripley Historic District	Ripley Historic District	August 25, 2004 (#04000919)	Portions of Charleston and Highlawn Drs., Church, Court, Main, Maple, North, 7th, and South Sts. 38°49′10″N 81°42′36″W	Ripley	
10	Sarvis Fork Covered Bridge	Sarvis Fork Covered Bridge	June 4, 1981 (#81000602)	County Route 21/15; 38°55′17″N 81°38′41″W	Sandyville	
11	Staats Mill Covered Bridge	Staats Mill Covered Bridge	May 29, 1979 (#79002582)	Off County Route 25 at Cedar Lakes; 38°47′40″N 81°41′14″W	Ripley	

== Former listing ==
	Name on the Register	Image	Date listed	Date removed	Location	City or town	Description
1	Old Ravenswood School		August 29, 1979 (#79002581)	April 16, 1984	Henry St. 38°56′54″N 81°45′24″W	Ravenswood	

== See also ==
- List of National Historic Landmarks in West Virginia
- National Register of Historic Places listings in West Virginia
