= National Register of Historic Places listings in Boone County, West Virginia =

Location of Boone County in West Virginia

This is a list of the National Register of Historic Places listings in Boone County, West Virginia.

This is intended to be a complete list of the properties and districts on the National Register of Historic Places in Boone County, West Virginia, United States. The locations of National Register properties and districts for which the latitude and longitude coordinates are included below, may be seen in a Google map.

There are 4 properties and districts listed on the National Register in the county.

This National Park Service list is complete through NPS recent listings posted March 21, 2025.

Contents: Counties in West Virginia

Barbour - Berkeley - Boone - Braxton - Brooke - Cabell - Calhoun - Clay - Doddridge - Fayette - Gilmer - Grant - Greenbrier - Hampshire - Hancock - Hardy - Harrison - Jackson - Jefferson - Kanawha - Lewis - Lincoln - Logan - Marion - Marshall - Mason - McDowell - Mercer - Mineral - Mingo - Monongalia - Monroe - Morgan - Nicholas - Ohio - Pendleton - Pleasants - Pocahontas - Preston - Putnam - Raleigh - Randolph - Ritchie - Roane - Summers - Taylor - Tucker - Tyler - Upshur - Wayne - Webster - Wetzel - Wirt - Wood - Wyoming

== Current listings ==
	Name on the Register	Image	Date listed	Location	City or town	Description
1	Boone County Courthouse	Boone County Courthouse	April 9, 1981 (#81000596)	State St. 38°03′59″N 81°49′08″W	Madison	
2	Madison National Bank	Madison National Bank	August 2, 2007 (#07000779)	375 Main St. 38°03′50″N 81°49′22″W	Madison	
3	Nellis Historic District	Nellis Historic District	March 24, 2000 (#00000292)	Off County Route 1; 38°09′03″N 81°44′30″W	Nellis	
4	Whitesville School	Whitesville School	December 18, 2013 (#13000955)	37949 Coal River Rd. 37°58′55″N 81°32′09″W	Whitesville	

== See also ==
- List of National Historic Landmarks in West Virginia
- National Register of Historic Places listings in West Virginia
