= National Register of Historic Places listings in Calhoun County, West Virginia =

Location of Calhoun County in West Virginia

This is a list of the National Register of Historic Places listings in Calhoun County, West Virginia.

This is intended to be a complete list of the properties and districts on the National Register of Historic Places in Calhoun County, West Virginia, United States. The locations of National Register properties and districts for which the latitude and longitude coordinates are included below, may be seen in an online map.

There are 2 properties listed on the National Register in the county.

This National Park Service list is complete through NPS recent listings posted March 21, 2025.

Contents: Counties in West Virginia

Barbour - Berkeley - Boone - Braxton - Brooke - Cabell - Calhoun - Clay - Doddridge - Fayette - Gilmer - Grant - Greenbrier - Hampshire - Hancock - Hardy - Harrison - Jackson - Jefferson - Kanawha - Lewis - Lincoln - Logan - Marion - Marshall - Mason - McDowell - Mercer - Mineral - Mingo - Monongalia - Monroe - Morgan - Nicholas - Ohio - Pendleton - Pleasants - Pocahontas - Preston - Putnam - Raleigh - Randolph - Ritchie - Roane - Summers - Taylor - Tucker - Tyler - Upshur - Wayne - Webster - Wetzel - Wirt - Wood - Wyoming

== Current listings ==
	Name on the Register	Image	Date listed	Location	City or town	Description
1	Alberts Chapel	Alberts Chapel	April 15, 1982 (#82004315)	U.S. Routes 33/119; 38°48′22″N 81°03′41″W	Sand Ridge	
2	Calhoun County High School		April 11, 2023 (#100008819)	101-103 School St. 38°55′12″N 81°05′36″W	Grantsville	

== See also ==
- List of National Historic Landmarks in West Virginia
- National Register of Historic Places listings in West Virginia
