= Wyco =

Wyco or WYCO may refer to:

- Wyco, West Virginia, an unincorporated community in Wyoming County
- Wyco Church, in Wyoming County, West Virginia
- Wyoming Colorado Railroad (WYCO)
- Wye College, a former medieval chantry, grammar school and university in Kent, England
- WYCO-LP, a low-power radio station (106.1 FM) licensed to serve York, Pennsylvania, United States
