= National Register of Historic Places listings in Wyoming County, West Virginia =

Location of Wyoming County in West Virginia

This is a list of the National Register of Historic Places listings in Wyoming County, West Virginia.

This is intended to be a complete list of the properties and districts on the National Register of Historic Places in Wyoming County, West Virginia, United States. The locations of National Register properties and districts for which the latitude and longitude coordinates are included below, may be seen in a Google map.

There are 4 properties and districts listed on the National Register in the county.

This National Park Service list is complete through NPS recent listings posted December 12, 2025.

Contents: Counties in West Virginia

Barbour - Berkeley - Boone - Braxton - Brooke - Cabell - Calhoun - Clay - Doddridge - Fayette - Gilmer - Grant - Greenbrier - Hampshire - Hancock - Hardy - Harrison - Jackson - Jefferson - Kanawha - Lewis - Lincoln - Logan - Marion - Marshall - Mason - McDowell - Mercer - Mineral - Mingo - Monongalia - Monroe - Morgan - Nicholas - Ohio - Pendleton - Pleasants - Pocahontas - Preston - Putnam - Raleigh - Randolph - Ritchie - Roane - Summers - Taylor - Tucker - Tyler - Upshur - Wayne - Webster - Wetzel - Wirt - Wood - Wyoming

== Current listings ==
	Name on the Register	Image	Date listed	Location	City or town	Description
1	Itmann Company Store and Office	Itmann Company Store and Office	November 28, 1990 (#90001775)	West Virginia Routes 10 and 16; 37°34′26″N 81°25′04″W	Itmann	
2	Mullens Historic District	Mullens Historic District	November 16, 1993 (#93001233)	Roughly bounded by Lusk and Highland Aves., the Norfolk Southern railroad tracks and Water St. 37°35′01″N 81°22′52″W	Mullens	
3	Wyco Church	Wyco Church	March 31, 2010 (#10000168)	County Route 12/1, approximately 1 mile north of County Route 16; 37°36′02″N 81°20′36″W	Wyco	Community church built in 1917 by coal baron W.P. Tams to serve Wyco Coal Camp C
4	Wyoming County Courthouse and Jail	Wyoming County Courthouse and Jail	November 27, 1979 (#79002607)	Main St. 37°35′01″N 81°32′16″W	Pineville	

== See also ==
- List of National Historic Landmarks in West Virginia
- National Register of Historic Places listings in West Virginia
