= Whiting House (Glenville, West Virginia) =

Historic house in West Virginia, United States

- U.S. National Register of Historic Places
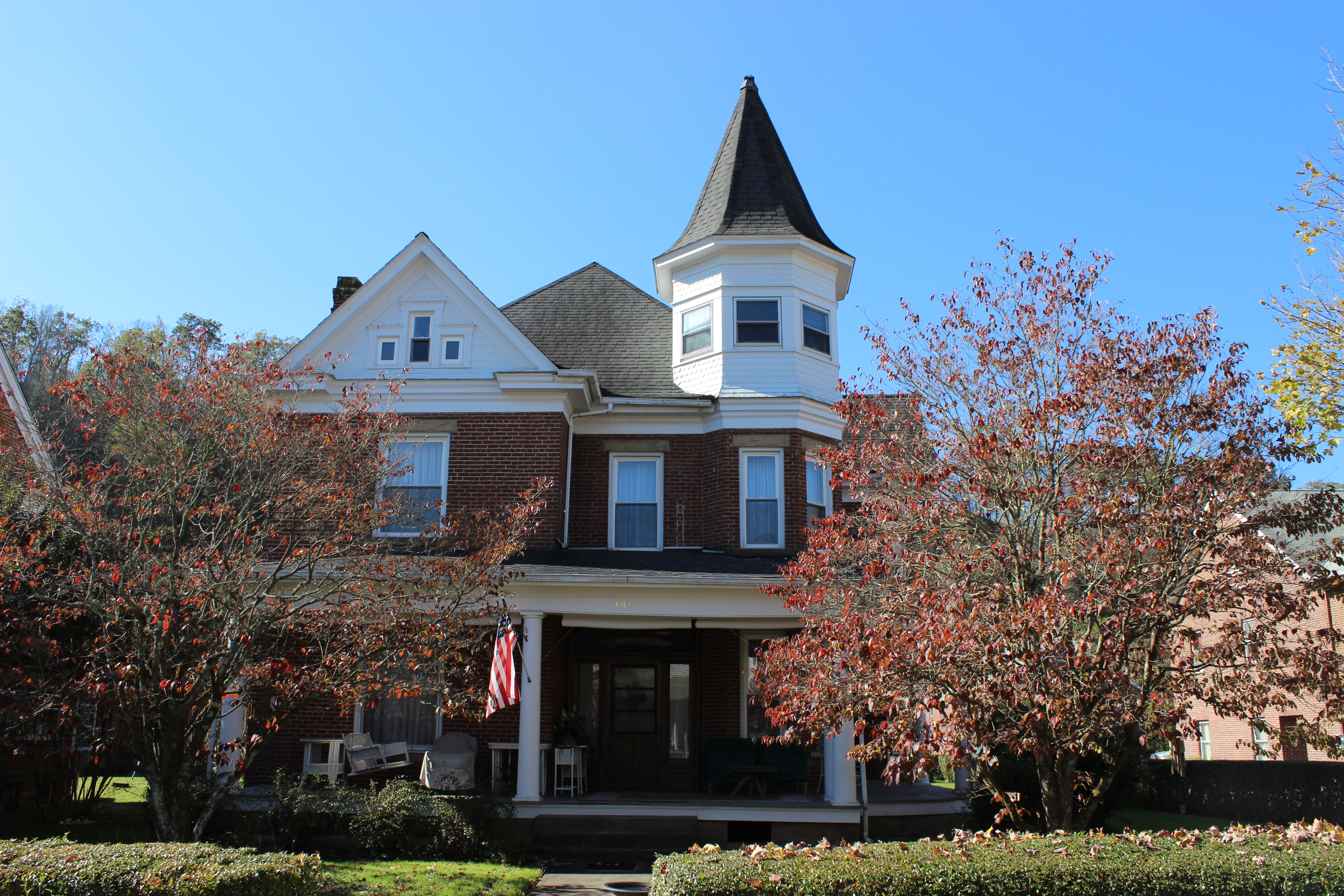

- Location within West Virginia Location within the United States
- Location: 301 E. Main St., Glenville, West Virginia
- Coordinates: 38°55′57″N 80°50′12″W
- Area: less than one acre
- Built: 1897
- Architect: Whiting, Charles Thomas
- Architectural style: Queen Anne
- NRHP reference No.: 98001480
- Added to NRHP: December 4, 1998

Whiting House is a historic home located at Glenville, Gilmer County, West Virginia, United States. It was built in 1897 and is a three-story Queen Anne-style residence. It is a brick building and sits on a raised sandstone foundation. It features a conical tower and a screened in, full-height two story porch facing the Little Kanawha River.

It was listed on the National Register of Historic Places in 1998.
