= Job's Temple =

Historic church in West Virginia, United States

- U.S. National Register of Historic Places
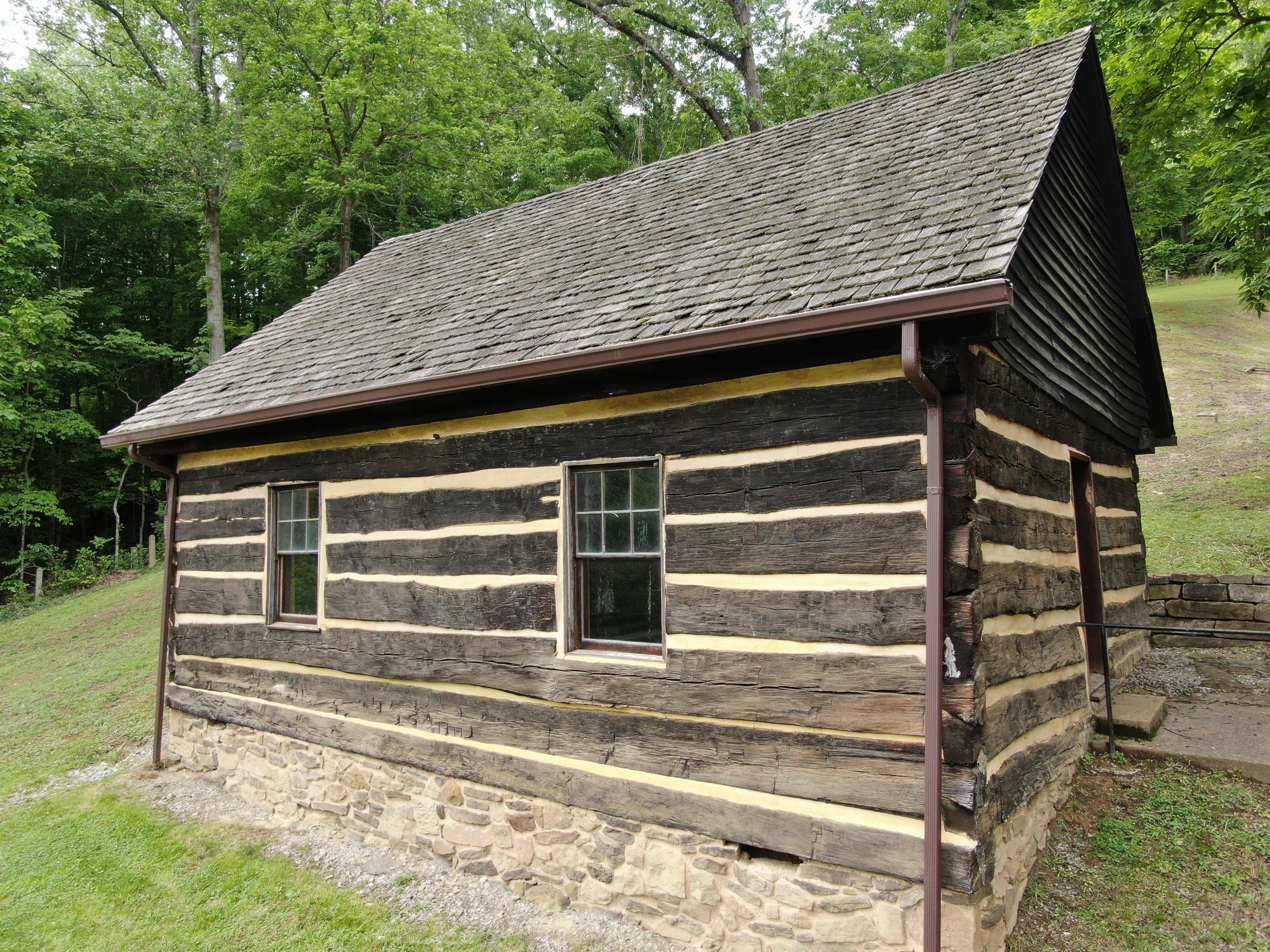

- Location within West Virginia Location within the United States
- Location: West of Glenville on WV 5, near Glenville, West Virginia
- Coordinates: 38°55′56″N 80°57′45″W
- Area: 1 acre (0.40 ha)
- Built: 1860
- NRHP reference No.: 79002575
- Added to NRHP: May 29, 1979

Job's Temple is a historic Methodist church building located near Glenville, Gilmer County, West Virginia. It was built between 1860 and 1866, and is a building constructed of poplar log, measuring 18 feet by 24 feet. The building was renovated between 1928 and 1936. Adjacent to the church is Job's Temple Cemetery, containing 122 graves.

It was listed on the National Register of Historic Places in 1979.
