= The West Virginia Hills =

Poem and Music

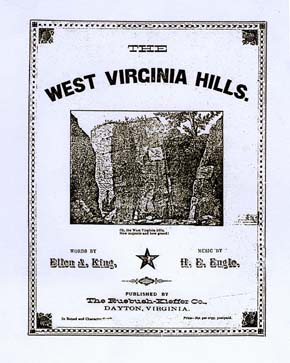
- Regional anthem of West Virginia
- Lyrics: Disputed (see "history"), 1879
- Music: Henry Everett Engle, 1885
- Published: 1885; 141 years ago
- Adopted: February 3, 1961

"The West Virginia Hills" is one of West Virginia's four state songs.

== History ==
"The West Virginia Hills" was written in 1879 as a poem inspired by the scenery surrounding the Glenville area and put to music in 1885 by Henry Everett Engle. The song was made one of West Virginia's state songs on February 3, 1961.

While the original poem is traditionally credited to Ellen Ruddell King, it is believed by some that the lyrics were in fact written by her husband, the Reverend David King.

== Lyrics ==
I.

Oh, the West Virginia hills! How majestic and how grand,
With their summits bathed in glory, Like our Prince Immanuel's Land!
Is it any wonder then, That my heart with rapture thrills,
As I stand once more with loved ones On those West Virginia hills?

Chorus

Oh, the hills, beautiful hills, How I love those West Virginia hills!
If o'er sea o'er land I roam, Still I'll think of happy home,
And my friends among the West Virginia hills!

II.

Oh, the West Virginia hills! Where my childhood hours were passed,
Where I often wandered lonely, And the future tried to cast;
Many are our visions bright, Which the future ne'er fulfills;
But how sunny were my daydreams On those West Virginia hills!

III.

Oh, the West Virginia hills! How unchang'd they seem to stand,
With their summits pointed skyward To the Great Almighty's Land!
Many changes I can see, Which my heart with sadness fills;
But no changes can be noticed In those West Virginia hills!

IV.

Oh, the West Virginia hills! I must bid you now adieu.
In my home beyond the mountains I shall ever dream of you;
In the evening time of life, If my Father only wills,
I shall still behold the vision of those West Virginia hills!
