= Nellis, West Virginia =

Nellis
- unincorporated community
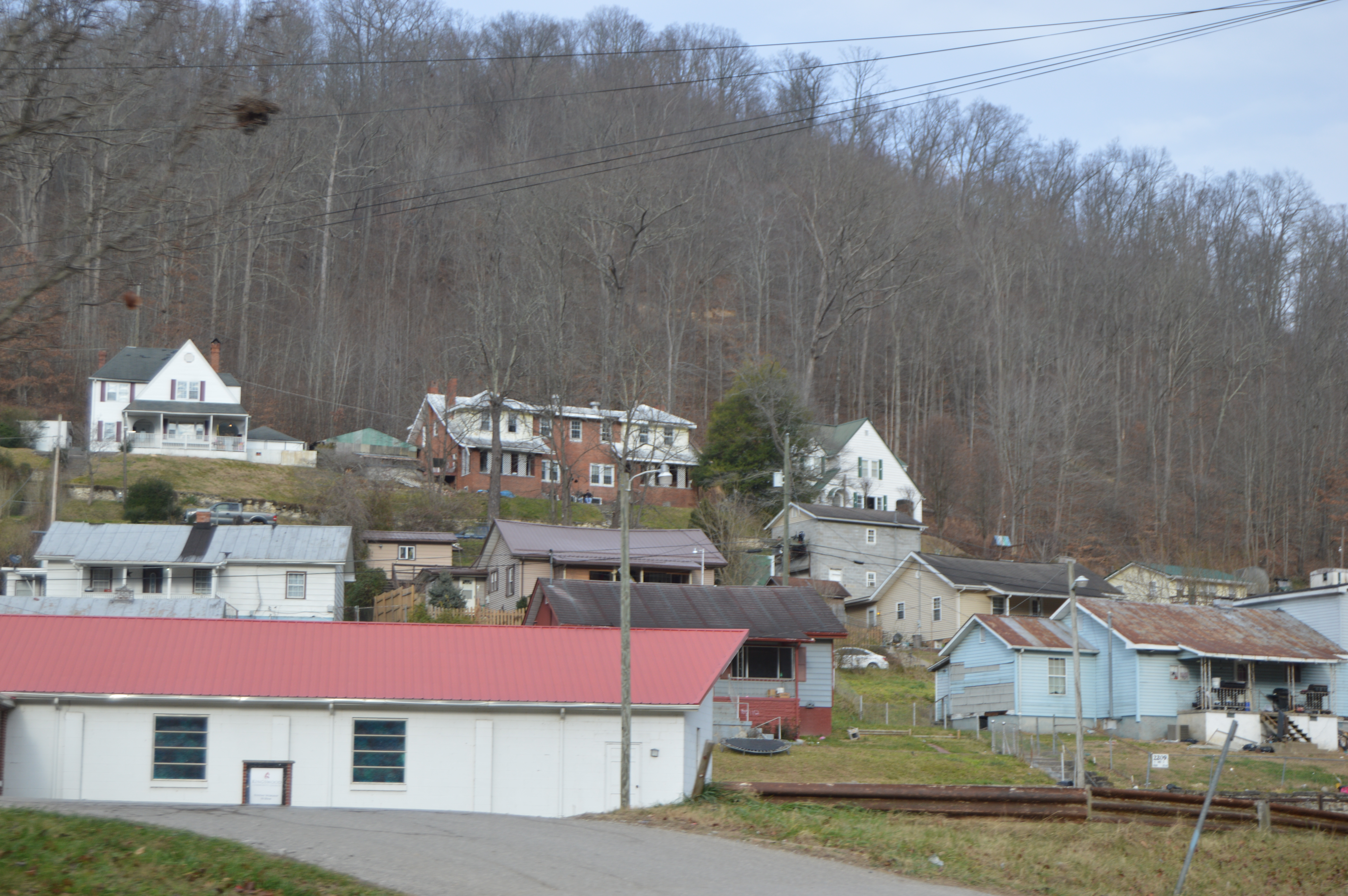
- Houses east of the store

- Location within the state of West Virginia Nellis (the United States)
- Coordinates: 38°9′3″N 81°44′33″W
- Country: United States
- State: West Virginia
- County: Boone
- Elevation: 764 ft (233 m)
- Time zone: UTC-5 (Eastern (EST))
  - Summer (DST): UTC-4 (EDT)
- ZIP code: 25142
- Area codes: 304 and 681
- GNIS feature ID: 1555196

Nellis is an unincorporated community coal town in Boone County, West Virginia, United States on Brush Creek. The Nellis Historic District was listed on the National Register of Historic Places in 2000. Nellis was named by mine owners Matthew Slush and T.E.B. Siler after Frank E. Nellis, editor of the "Mount Clemens Independent" in Michigan.
