= Old Ravenswood School =

- Formerly listed on the U.S. National Register of Historic Places
- Location within West Virginia Location within the United States
- Location: Henry St., Ravenswood, West Virginia
- Coordinates: 38°57′04″N 81°45′27″W
- Area: 0.5 acres (0.20 ha)
- Built: 1887
- Architect: O'Blennes, H.
- Architectural style: 19th Century Eclectic
- NRHP reference No.: 79002581

Significant dates
- Added to NRHP: August 29, 1979
- Removed from NRHP: April 16, 1984

Old Ravenswood School, also known as "1887 School," was a historic school building located at Ravenswood, Jackson County, West Virginia. It was built in 1887–1888, and was a two-story brick building with an irregular hipped roof with a truncated tower that, until 1971, supported a belfry. The school closed in 1968. The school has been demolished.

It was listed on the National Register of Historic Places in 1979.
