= Fidler's Mill =

- U.S. National Register of Historic Places
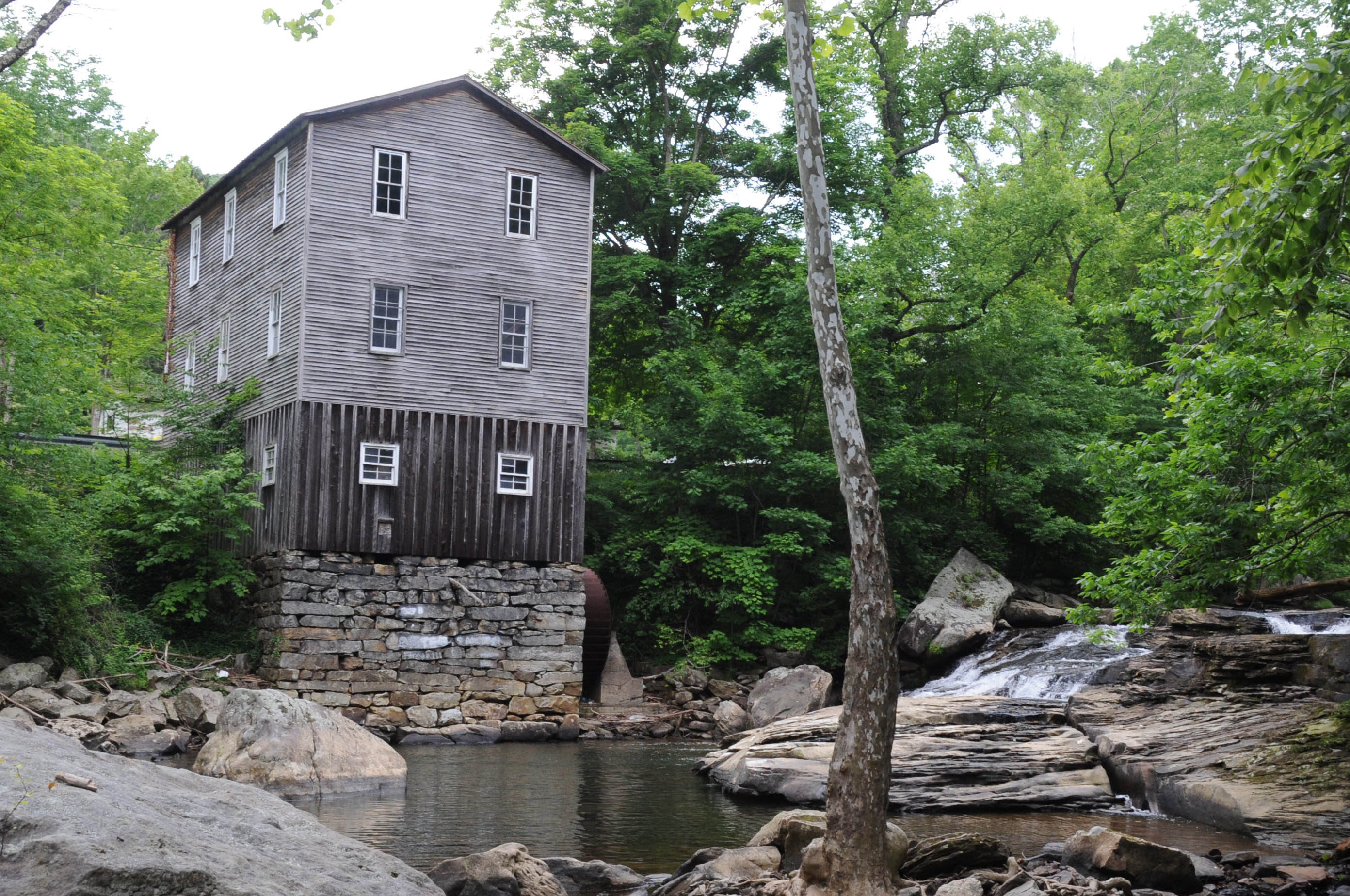

- Location within West Virginia Location within the United States
- Location: Heaston Ridge Rd., Arlington, West Virginia
- Coordinates: 38°47′58.128″N 80°20′48.516″W
- Area: 2.5 acres (1.0 ha)
- Built: 1849
- Architect: Fidler, William; Wilson, E.G.
- NRHP reference No.: 97001414
- Added to NRHP: November 24, 1997

Fidler's Mill is a historic grist mill located at Arlington, Upshur County, West Virginia. It was built in 1847-1849 and enlarged in 1916. It is a two to four story frame building built of yellow poplar on a stone foundation. The mill provided ground wheat and buckwheat for flour, and ground cornmeal, and also housed wool carding machines, which were used seasonally.

Both mill and town were named for Alfious Arlington Fidler, proprietor. It was listed on the National Register of Historic Places in 1997.
