= Alberts Chapel =

Historic church in West Virginia, United States

- U.S. National Register of Historic Places
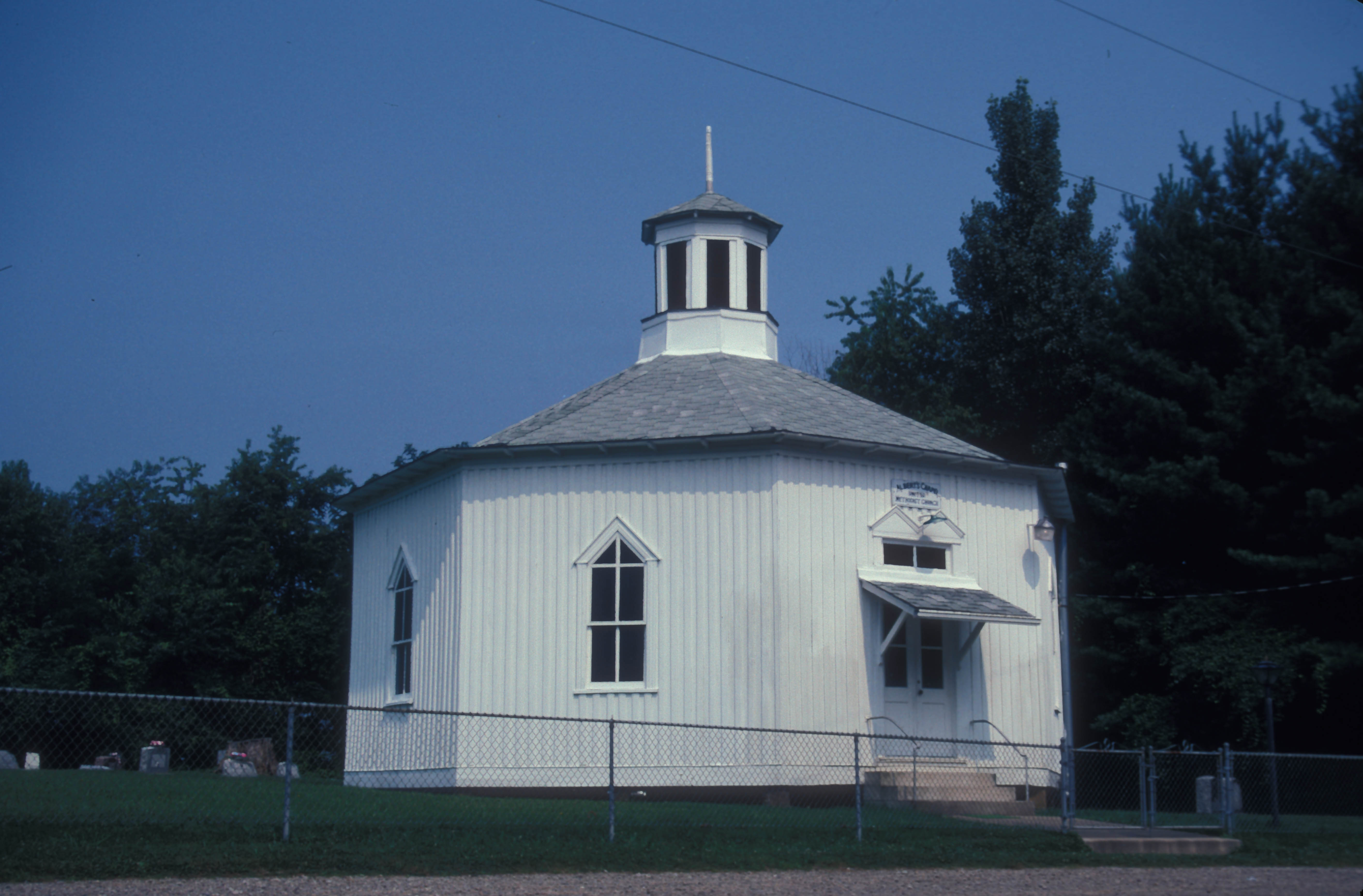

- Location within West Virginia Location within the United States
- Location: Sand Ridge, West Virginia
- Coordinates: 38°48′22″N 81°3′41″W
- Built: 1903
- Architect: Charles Poling
- Architectural style: Late Victorian
- NRHP reference No.: 82004315
- Added to NRHP: April 15, 1982

Alberts Chapel is an unusual octagonal Methodist church located near the settlement of Sand Ridge, West Virginia, United States. Built in the Carpenter Gothic-style, the simple, sparingly ornamented church rises to an octagonal cupola, with lancet windows and board-and-batten siding. The chapel was built in 1903 under the direction of Albert Poling by his uncle Charles Poling with materials provided by his brothers Asbury and Wesley. The church was named for Albert in recognition of his efforts.

The chapel seats as many as 300, a surprising number for such an apparently small building. A possibly apocryphal account of the origins of the octagonal design suggests that the form was chosen "so that the devil couldn't corner you in it." Suffering from advanced deterioration the chapel was entirely rebuilt in 2004, with little of the original fabric remaining.
