= War Memorial Building (New Martinsville, West Virginia) =

- U.S. National Register of Historic Places
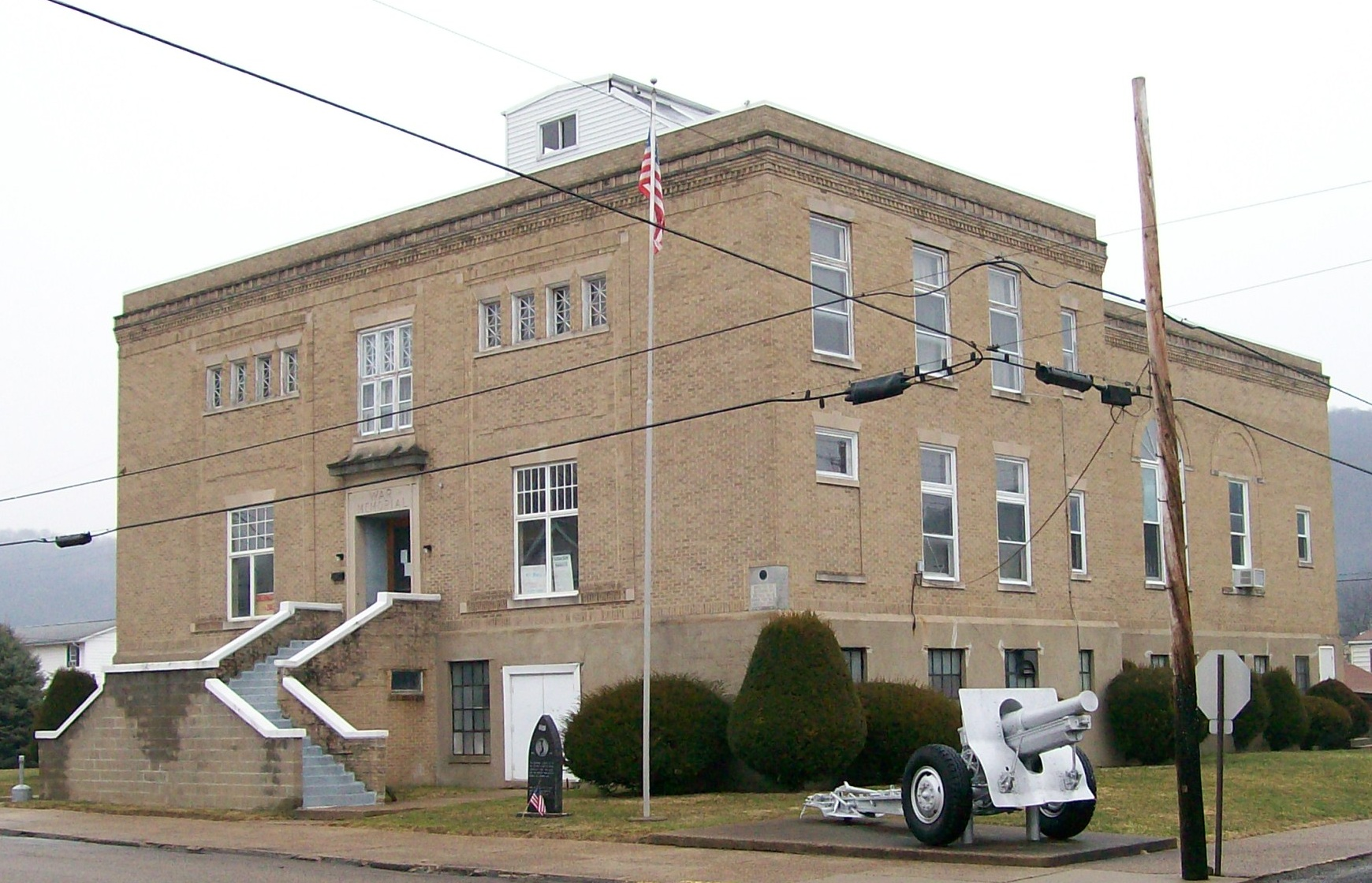
- War Memorial Building, February 2011

- Location within West Virginia Location within the United States
- Location: 501 N. Main St., New Martinsville, West Virginia
- Coordinates: 39°38′42″N 80°51′52″W
- Area: less than one acre
- Built: 1929
- Architect: Giesey, Millard F.; Dayton, J.U.
- Architectural style: Late 19th And 20th Century Revivals, Classical Revival
- NRHP reference No.: 97000787
- Added to NRHP: July 9, 1997

War Memorial Building is a historic community building located at New Martinsville, Wetzel County, West Virginia. It was built in 1929, and is a two-story, buff-colored wire brick building with Neoclassical design elements. The building was dedicated as a living memorial to the World War I veterans and is available for any group in the county to use for meetings or special events. It now serves as a memorial to Wetzel County veterans of all wars. It features a ballroom with hardwood maple floor.

It was listed on the National Register of Historic Places in 1997.
