= Whitesville School =

- U.S. National Register of Historic Places
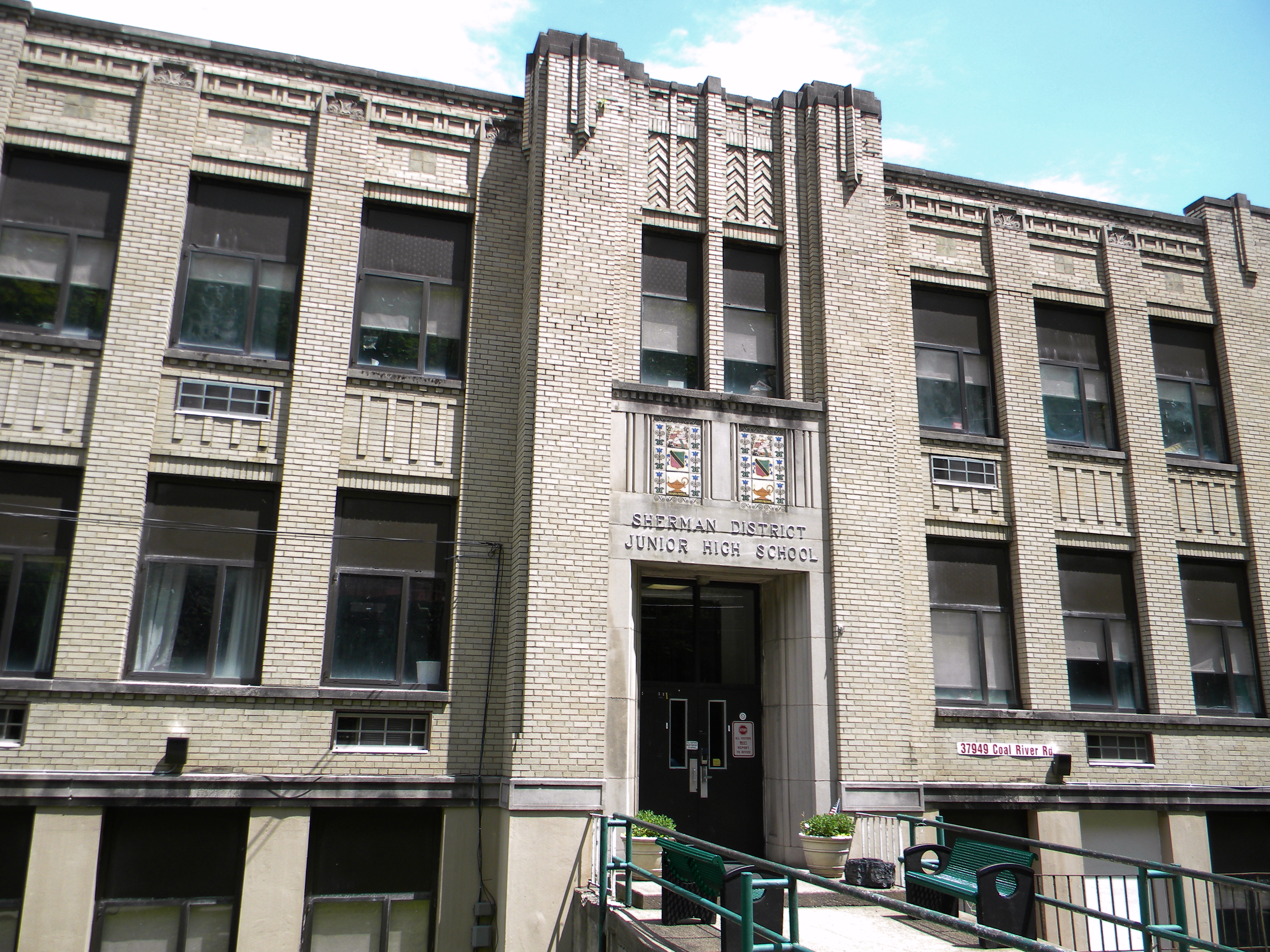
- Whitesville School

- Location within West Virginia Location within the United States
- Location: 37949 Coal River Rd., Whitesville, West Virginia
- Coordinates: 37°58′55″N 81°32′09″W
- Area: 5.94 acres (2.40 ha)
- Built: 1931
- Built by: Hill Brothers
- Architect: Wysong, Bengston & Jones
- Architectural style: Art Deco
- NRHP reference No.: 13000955
- Added to NRHP: December 18, 2013

Whitesville School, also known as Sherman District Junior High School, Whitesville Junior High School, and Whitesville Elementary School, is a historic school building located at Whitesville, Boone County, West Virginia. It was built in 1931, and is a two-story, blonde brick Art Deco style building. It sits on a raised basement and has an original two-story gymnasium/auditorium addition in the rear. It features two entrance areas that extend from the main elevation and upward through the roofline in a "tower" formation.

It was listed on the National Register of Historic Places in 2013.
