= Ravenswood "Old Town" Historic District =

Historic district in West Virginia, United States

- U.S. National Register of Historic Places
- U.S. Historic district
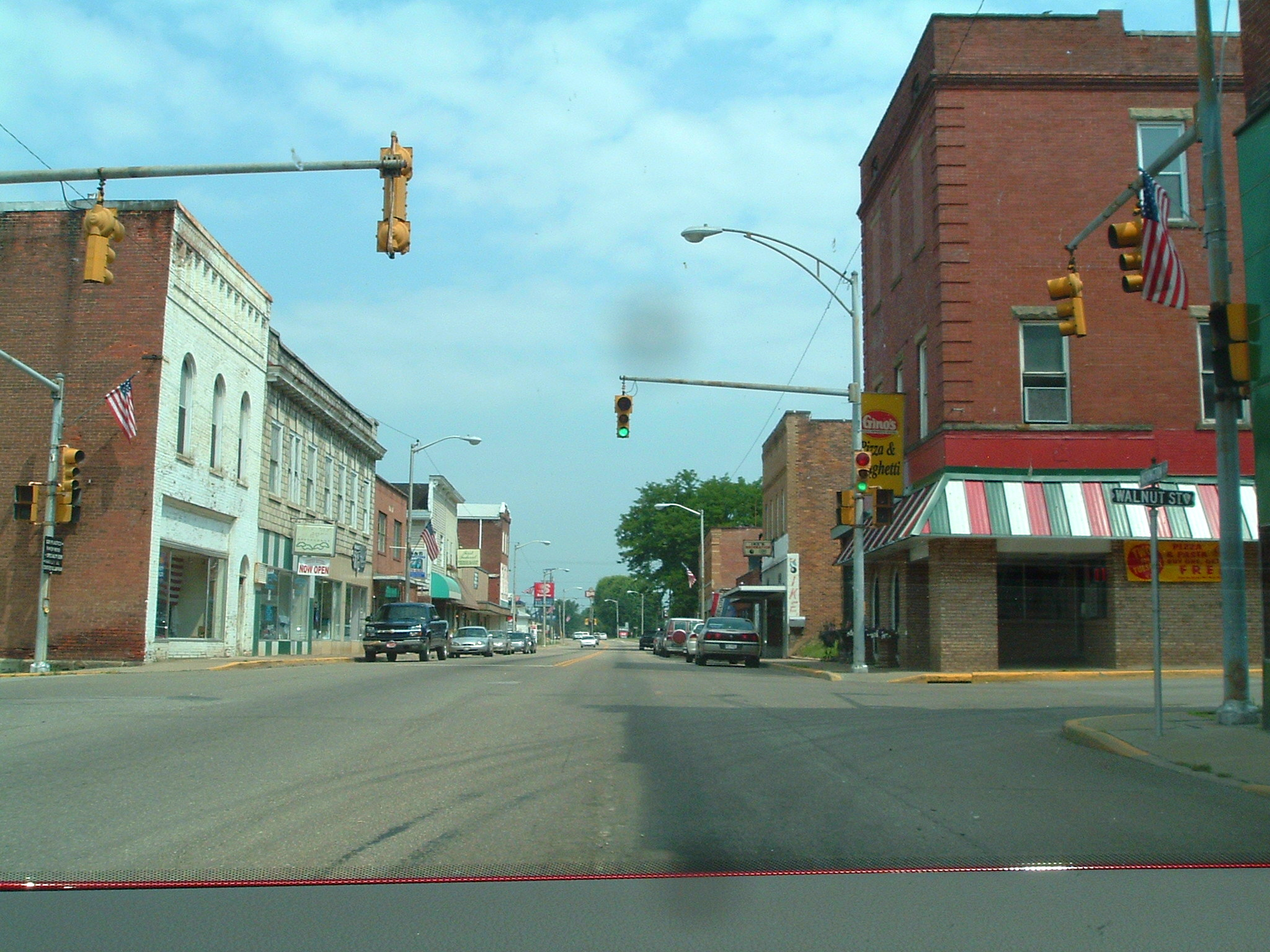
- Ravenswood, West Virginia, July 2006

- Location within West Virginia Location within the United States
- Location: Bounded by Sandy Creek, the Ohio R, Sycamore St. and adjoining properties and the city limits to the east, Ravenswood, West Virginia
- Coordinates: 38°56′53.2932″N 81°45′39.4734″W
- Area: 125 acres (51 ha)
- Architect: Brown, Tanzy; et al.
- Architectural style: Mid 19th Century Revival, Late Victorian
- NRHP reference No.: 07000243
- Added to NRHP: March 23, 2007

Ravenswood "Old Town" Historic District is a national historic district located at Ravenswood, Jackson County, West Virginia. It encompasses 313 contributing buildings and two contributing structures, the Ohio River Rail Road Steel Pratt-through truss Bridge and Concrete bridge on State Route 68 over Sandy Creek. It includes the commercial and civic core of the town, and surrounding residential buildings. It includes example of popular architectural styles of the mid- to late-19th and early-20th century, including Greek Revival, Gothic Revival, Queen Anne, Colonial Revival, Italianate, Craftsman, and Bungalow. Notable buildings include the McIntosh Building, First Baptist Church (c. 1876), Randolph Building/Caldwell Building (1907), the Grace Episcopal Church (c. 1900); Our Savior Evangelical Lutheran Church (c. 1928), Ravenswood Community Center (1938), and McIntosh House (c. 1890).

It was listed on the National Register of Historic Places in 2007.
