= Downtown Buckhannon Historic District =

Historic district in West Virginia, United States

- U.S. National Register of Historic Places
- U.S. Historic district
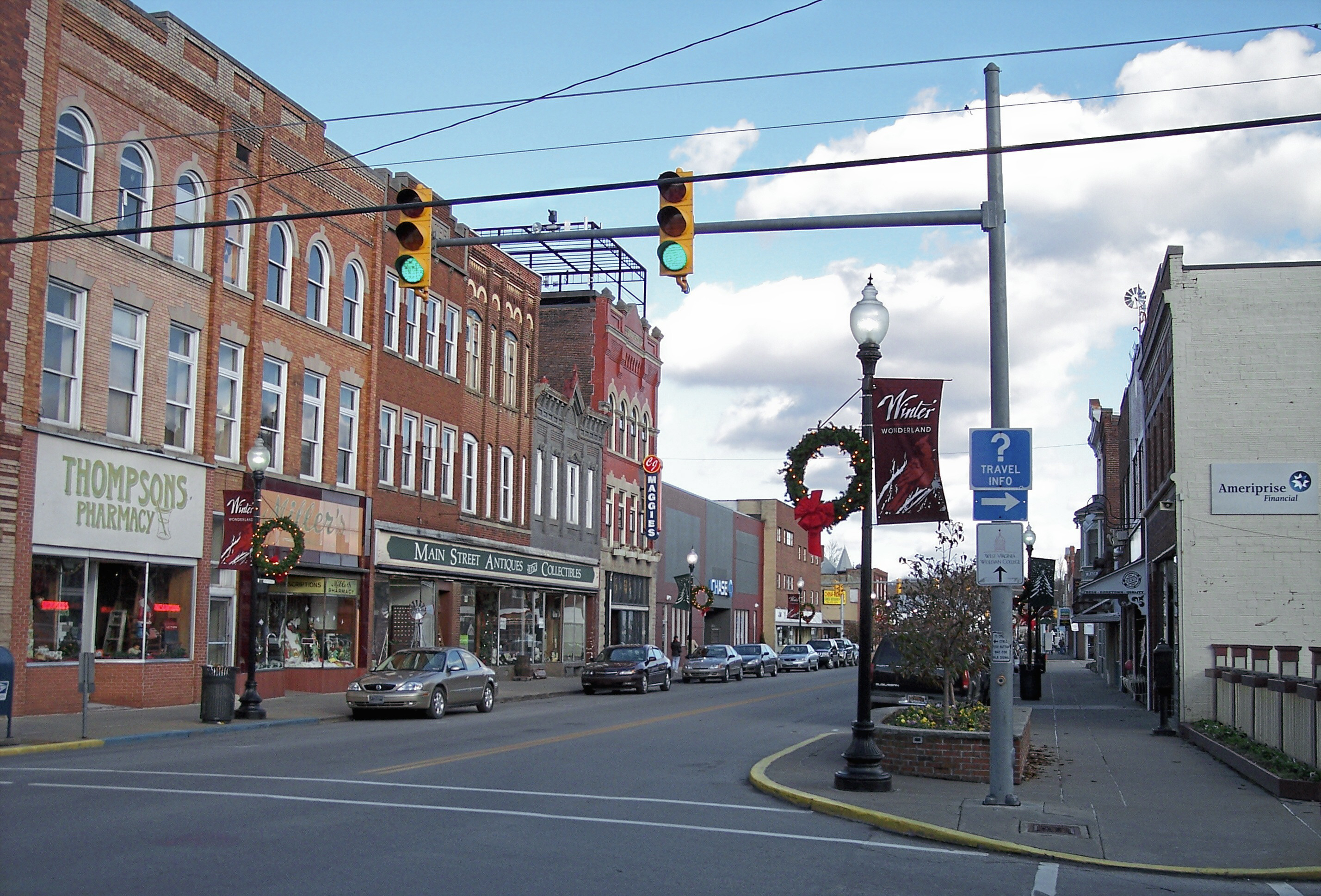
- Buckhannon, West Virginia, December 2006

- Location within West Virginia Location within the United States
- Location: Portions of E. and W. Main, N. and S. Florida, Locust, N. and S. Kanawha, and Spring Sts., Buckhannon, West Virginia
- Coordinates: 38°59′38.53″N 80°13′47.8″W
- Area: 16 acres (6.5 ha)
- Built: 1894
- Architect: Albright, Harrison; Hughes, Draper
- Architectural style: Italianate, Queen Anne, Colonial Revival, Classical Revival
- NRHP reference No.: 09001196
- Added to NRHP: December 30, 2009

Downtown Buckhannon Historic District is a national historic district located at Buckhannon, Upshur County, West Virginia. It encompasses 57 contributing buildings and one contributing structure that include the civic and commercial core of Buckhannon. Most of the buildings in the district date from the late-19th and early-20th century in popular architectural styles, such as Italianate, Queen Anne, Colonial Revival, and Classical Revival. Notable buildings include the Presbyterian Church on Locust Street (1879), T. L. Stockert Building (1908), Peoples Bank Building (1910), Upshur County Court House, and U.S. Post Office (1916).

It was listed on the National Register of Historic Places in 2009.
