= Faber Double-Crib Barn =

Historic barn in West Virginia, US

- U.S. National Register of Historic Places
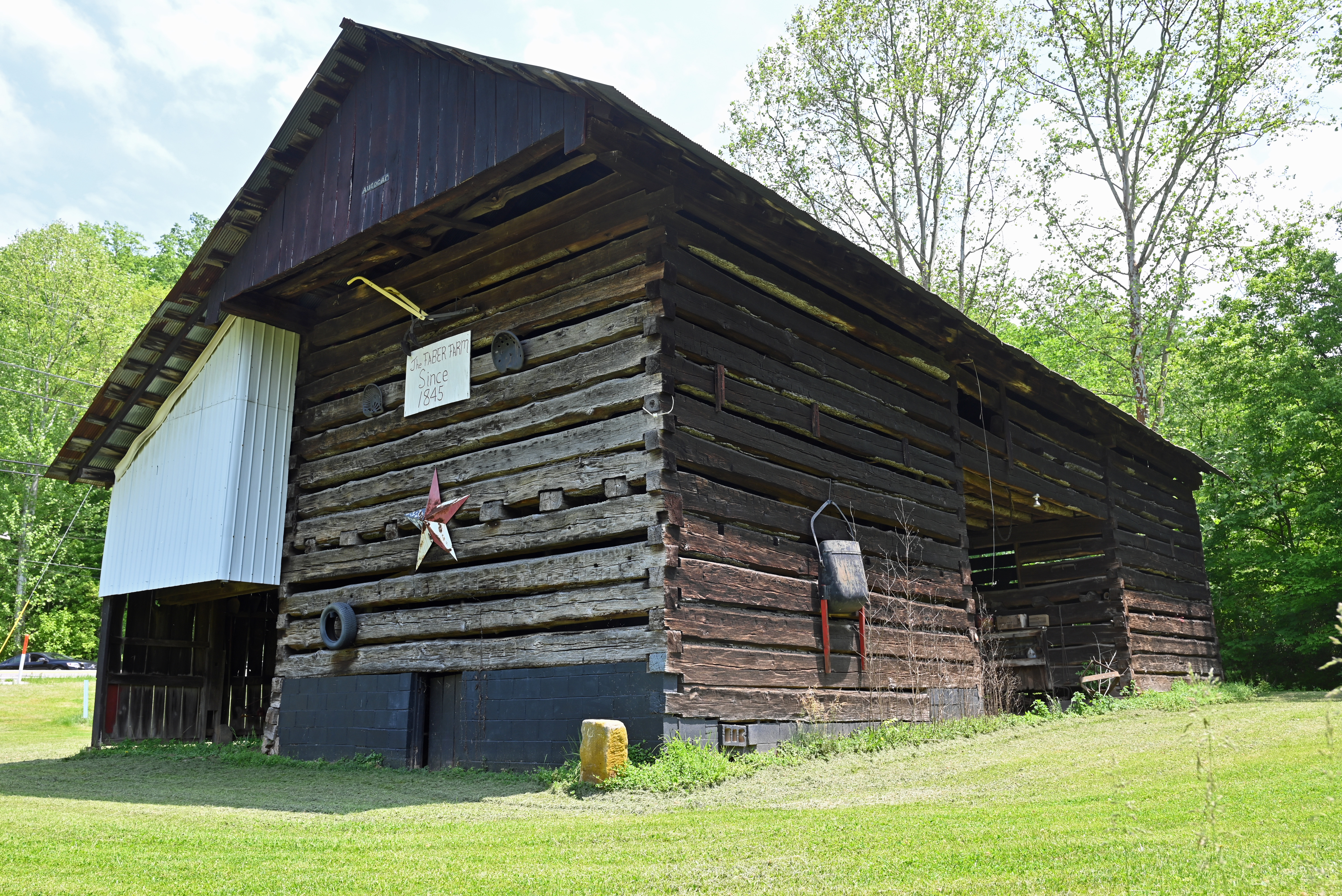

- Location within West Virginia Location within the United States
- Location: 1106 County Route 21, near Kenna, West Virginia
- Coordinates: 38°37′14″N 81°39′57″W
- Area: less than one acre
- Built: 1860
- Architect: Faber, Hiram
- Architectural style: Double-crib barn
- NRHP reference No.: 05001007
- Added to NRHP: September 7, 2005

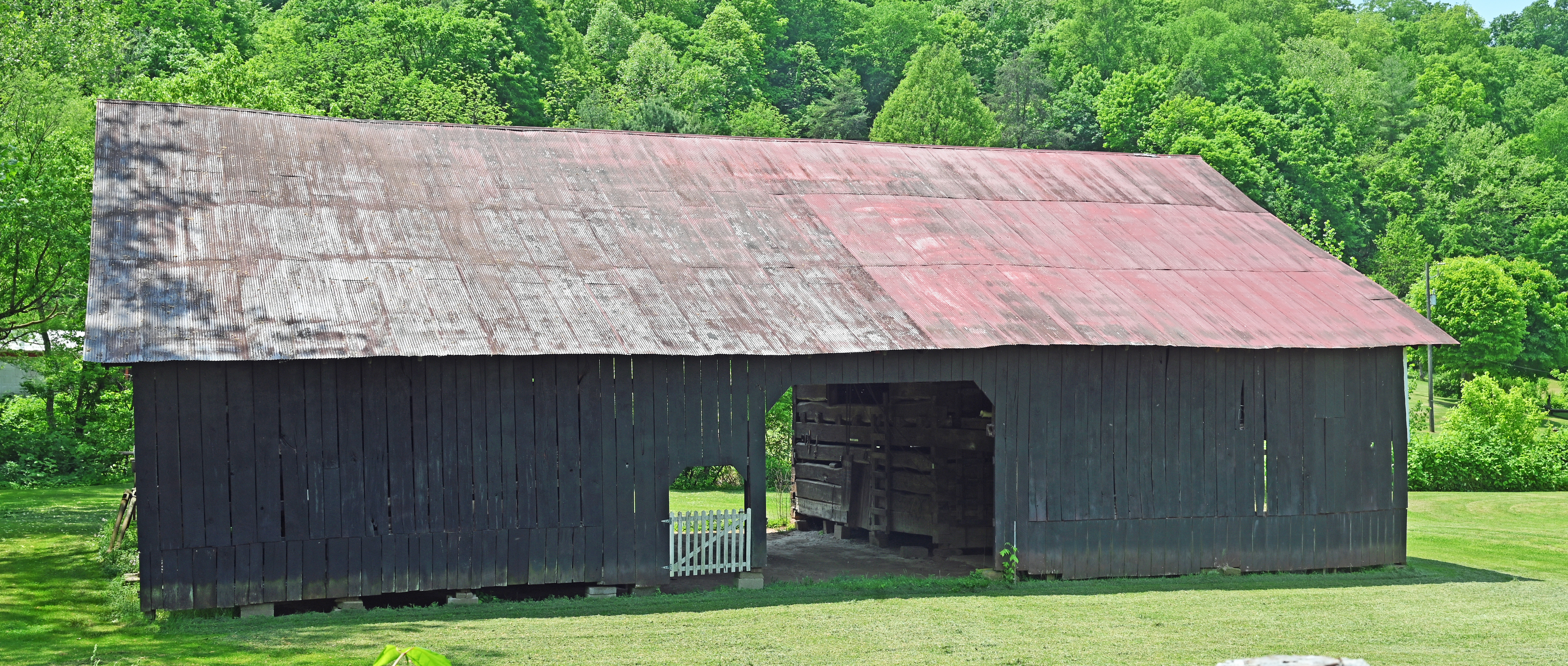
Long view

Faber Double-Crib Barn is a historic barn located near Kenna, Jackson County, West Virginia. It was built in 1859–1860, and is a double-pen style log barn, with each pen measuring 22 by 22 feet (6.7 by 6.7 m). A 22 feet wide breezeway, originally with a thrashing floor, separates the two pens.

It was listed on the National Register of Historic Places in 2005.
