= Cedarville School =

- U.S. National Register of Historic Places
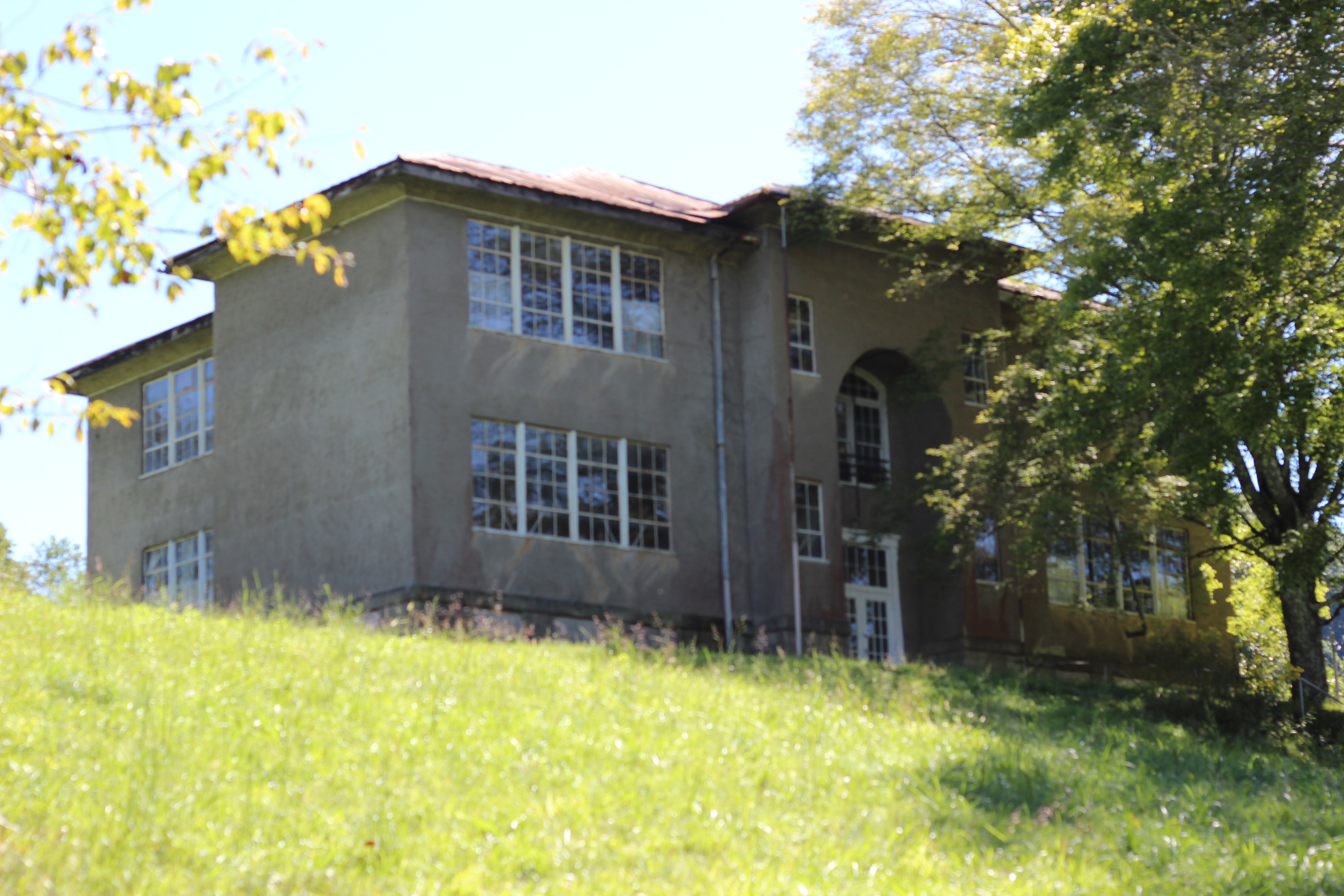
- Cedarville School in 2013

- Location within West Virginia Location within the United States
- Location: Jct. of Smith Ave. and Edmond St., Cedarville, West Virginia
- Coordinates: 38°50′25″N 80°49′8″W
- Area: 4 acres (1.6 ha)
- Built: 1923
- Architect: West, J. M., and Sons
- Architectural style: Bungalow/Craftsman, Foursquare
- NRHP reference No.: 94000210
- Added to NRHP: March 25, 1994

Cedarville School is a historic school building located at Cedarville, Gilmer County, West Virginia. Built in 1923, the structure is a two-story, T-shaped wood-frame building with a hipped roof measuring approximately 50 feet in depth and 80 feet in width. It has striated stuccoed exterior surfaces and is on a raised basement of locally quarried stone. It was used as a school until 1968, after which it was converted to apartments.

It was listed on the National Register of Historic Places in 1994.
