= Gilmer County Poor Farm Infirmary =

Historic building in West Virginia, US

- U.S. National Register of Historic Places
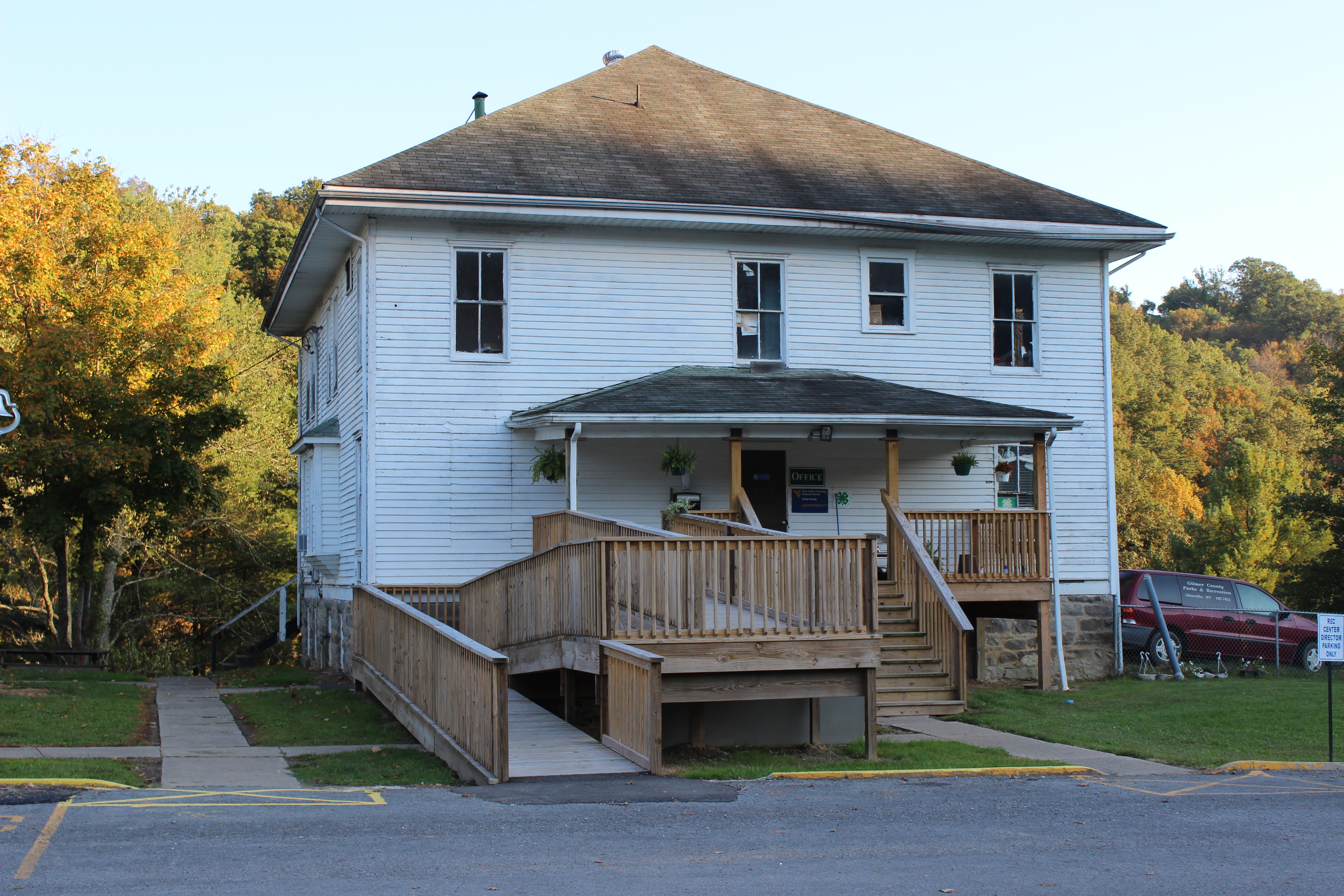
- Front

- Location within West Virginia Location within the United States
- Location: Off Sycamore Rd. on Recreation Center Rd., near Glenville, West Virginia
- Coordinates: 38°57′1.593″N 80°49′45.959″W
- Area: less than one acre
- Built: 1907
- Architect: Albert Newton West, William Dolivar Whiting
- Architectural style: Colonial Revival, four square
- NRHP reference No.: 98001465
- Added to NRHP: December 4, 1998

Gilmer County Poor Farm Infirmary is a historic poor farm infirmary building located near Glenville, Gilmer County, West Virginia. It was built in 1907 by what is now the Glenville Golf Club, and is a two-story, three-bay, center entrance frame building with a cross-hip pitched roof and Colonial Revival-style details. The infirmary was in operation until 1941, after which it was used as a day care center and as meeting space for local social and civic organizations.

It was listed on the National Register of Historic Places in 1998.
