= North Street Historic District (New Martinsville, West Virginia) =

Historic district in West Virginia, United States

- U.S. National Register of Historic Places
- U.S. Historic district
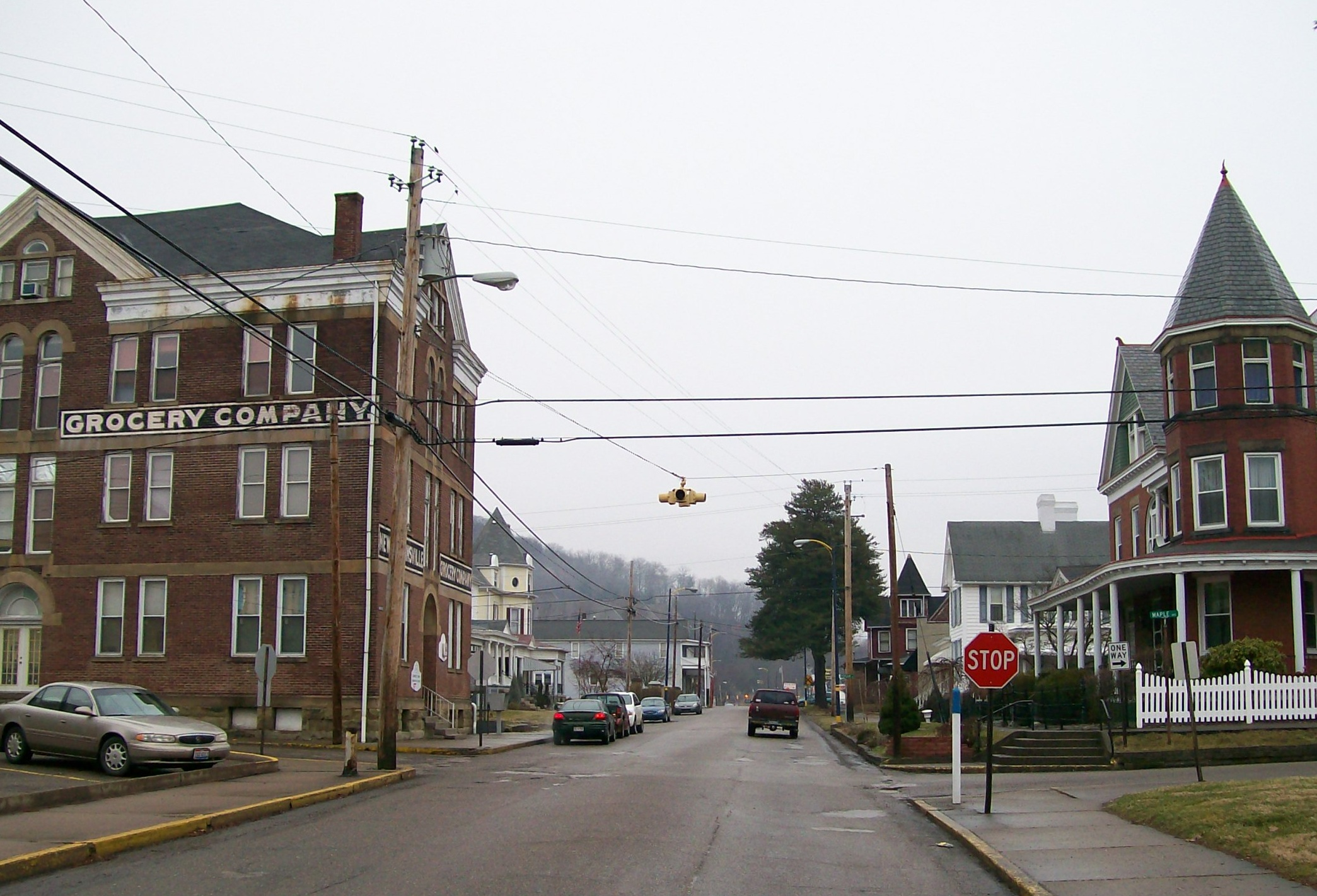
- North Street Historic District, February 2011

- Location within West Virginia Location within the United States
- Location: North St. between Florida and the railroad tracks, New Martinsville, West Virginia
- Coordinates: 39°38′33″N 80°51′42″W
- Area: 4 acres (1.6 ha)
- Built: 1884
- Architectural style: Late 19th And Early 20th Century American Movements, Late 19th And 20th Century Revivals, Late Victorian
- NRHP reference No.: 88000677
- Added to NRHP: June 7, 1988

North Street Historic District is a national historic district located at New Martinsville, Wetzel County, West Virginia. It encompasses 23 contributing buildings that include a residential and commercial area of New Martinsville. Most of the buildings in the district date to the late-19th and early-20th century in popular architectural styles, such as Stick Style, Queen Anne, and American Foursquare. Notable buildings include the Old Hospital Building (c. 1890, no longer standing), New Martinsville Grocery Company and warehouse (1895), former Cottage Hotel (1890), and the Moose Club (c. 1915).

It was listed on the National Register of Historic Places in 1988. Since then, five of its contributing structures have been demolished.
