= Little Kanawha Valley Bank =

- U.S. National Register of Historic Places
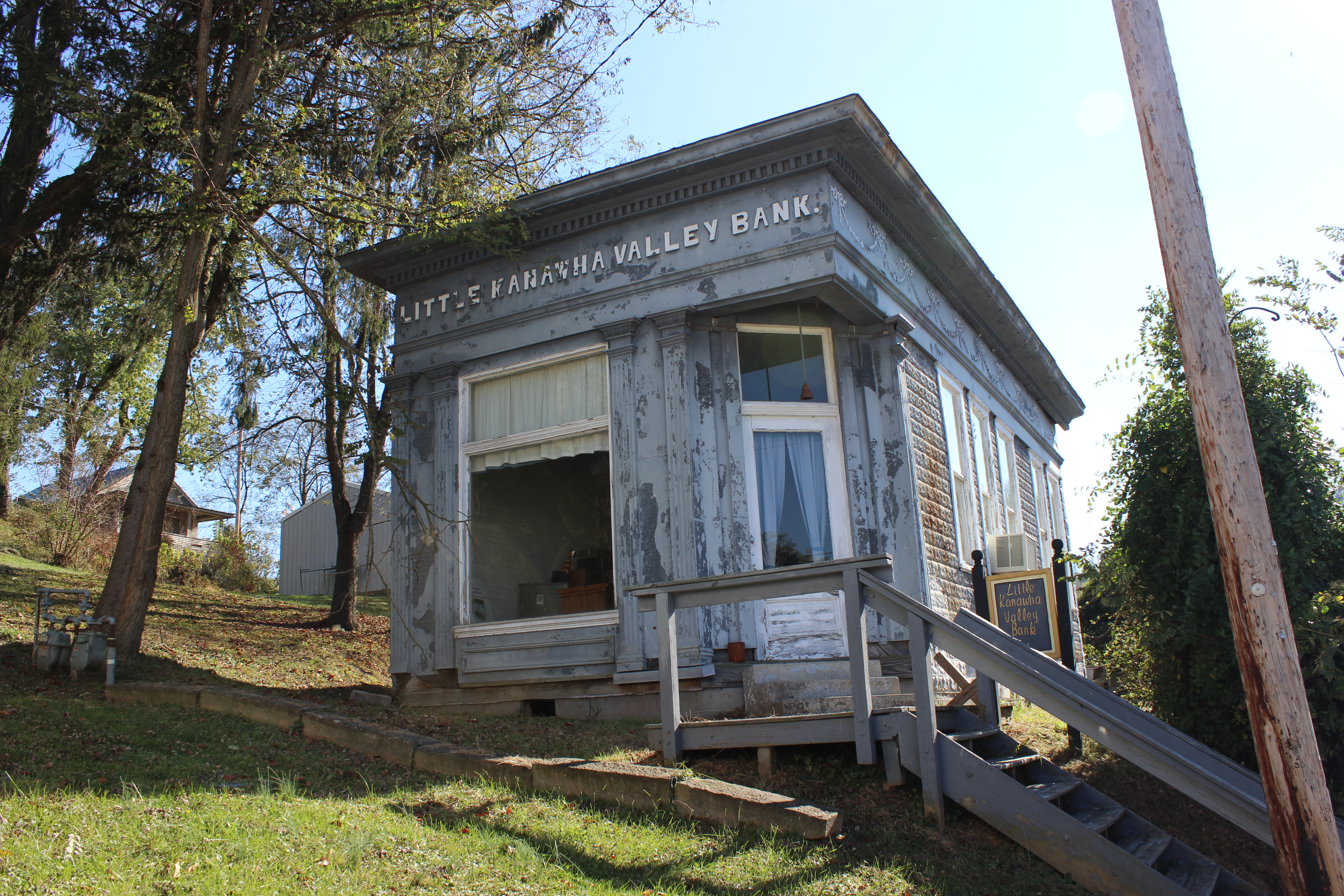
- Location: 5 Howard St., Glenville, West Virginia
- Coordinates: 38°56′1″N 80°50′10″W
- Area: less than one acre
- Architectural style: Classical Revival
- NRHP reference No.: 91001012
- Added to NRHP: August 5, 1991

Little Kanawha Valley Bank is a historic bank building located at Glenville, Gilmer County, West Virginia. It was built in 1901 and is a small one-story commercial building with Classical Revival-style details. It is a rectangular frame building covered in pressed sheet metal. It was occupied by the Little Kanawha Valley Bank until 1916 when they moved to larger quarters.

It was listed on the National Register of Historic Places in 1991.
