= New Martinsville Downtown Historic District =

Historic district in West Virginia, United States

- U.S. National Register of Historic Places
- U.S. Historic district
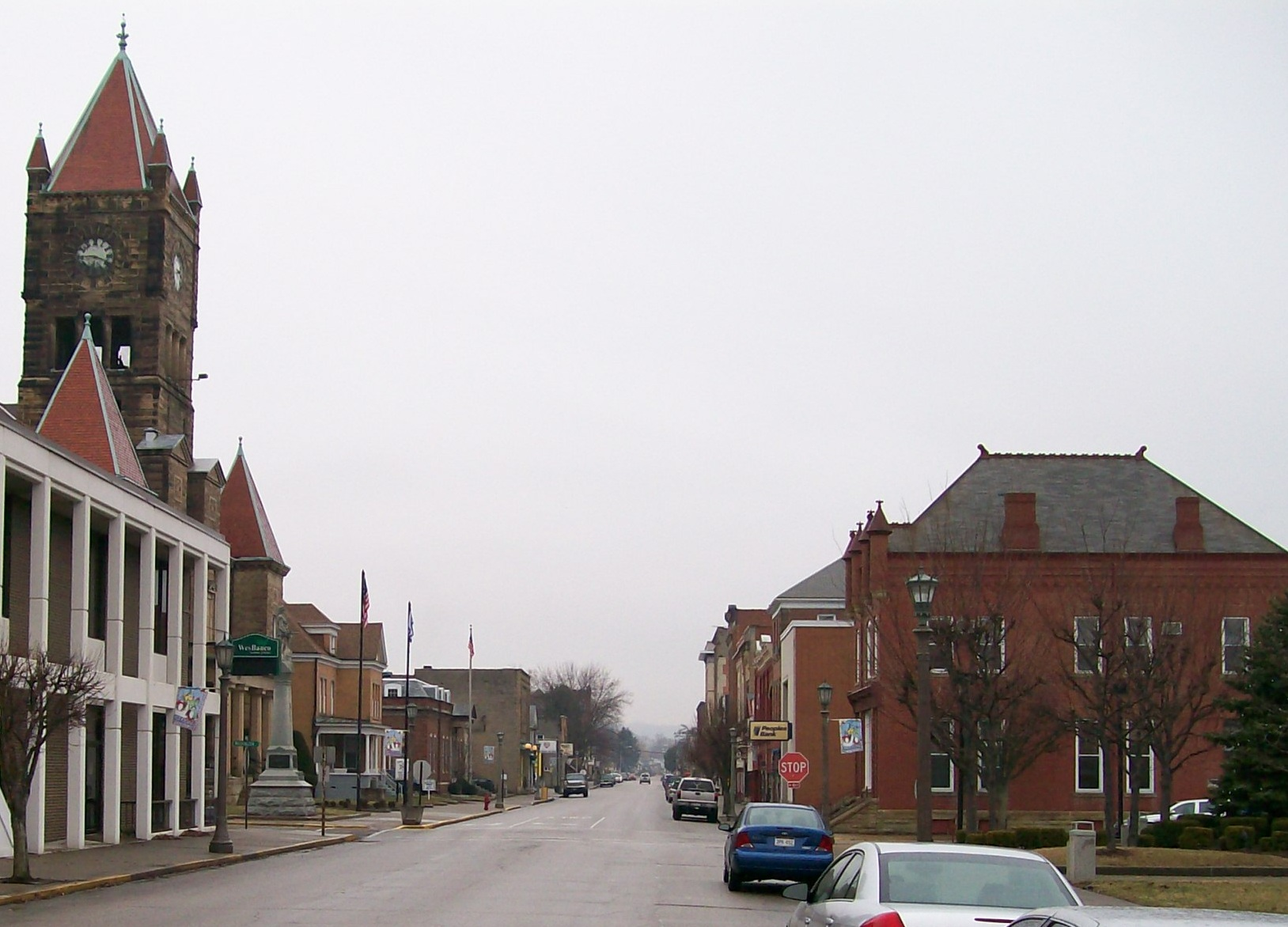
- New Martinsville Historic District, February 2011

- Location within West Virginia Location within the United States
- Location: Main, Washington Sts., and Monroe Alley, New Martinsville, West Virginia
- Coordinates: 39°38′28″N 80°51′16″W
- Area: 10.5 acres (4.2 ha)
- Architect: Multiple
- Architectural style: Late 19th And 20th Century Revivals, Greek Revival, Late Victorian
- NRHP reference No.: 88000675
- Added to NRHP: September 23, 1988

New Martinsville Downtown Historic District is a national historic district located at New Martinsville, Wetzel County, West Virginia. It encompasses 29 contributing buildings and one contributing site that include the civic and commercial core of New Martinsville. Most of the buildings in the district are two and three story masonry commercial structures dating to the late-19th and early-20th century in popular architectural styles, such as Italianate, Romanesque Revival, and Colonial Revival. Notable buildings include the New Martinsville City Building (1895), The McCaskey Building (1898), Winer's Department Store (1908), McCrory's (c. 1905), The Masonic Temple (1913), Theater/Palmer's Drug Store (1911), Lincoln Theatre (1920), United States Post Office (1931), Wetzel County Sheriff's residence (1897-1901), and Wetzel County Courthouse (1902).

It was listed on the National Register of Historic Places in 1988.
