= Buckhannon Central Residential Historical District =

Historic district in West Virginia, United States

- Buckhannon Central Residential Historic District
- U.S. National Register of Historic Places
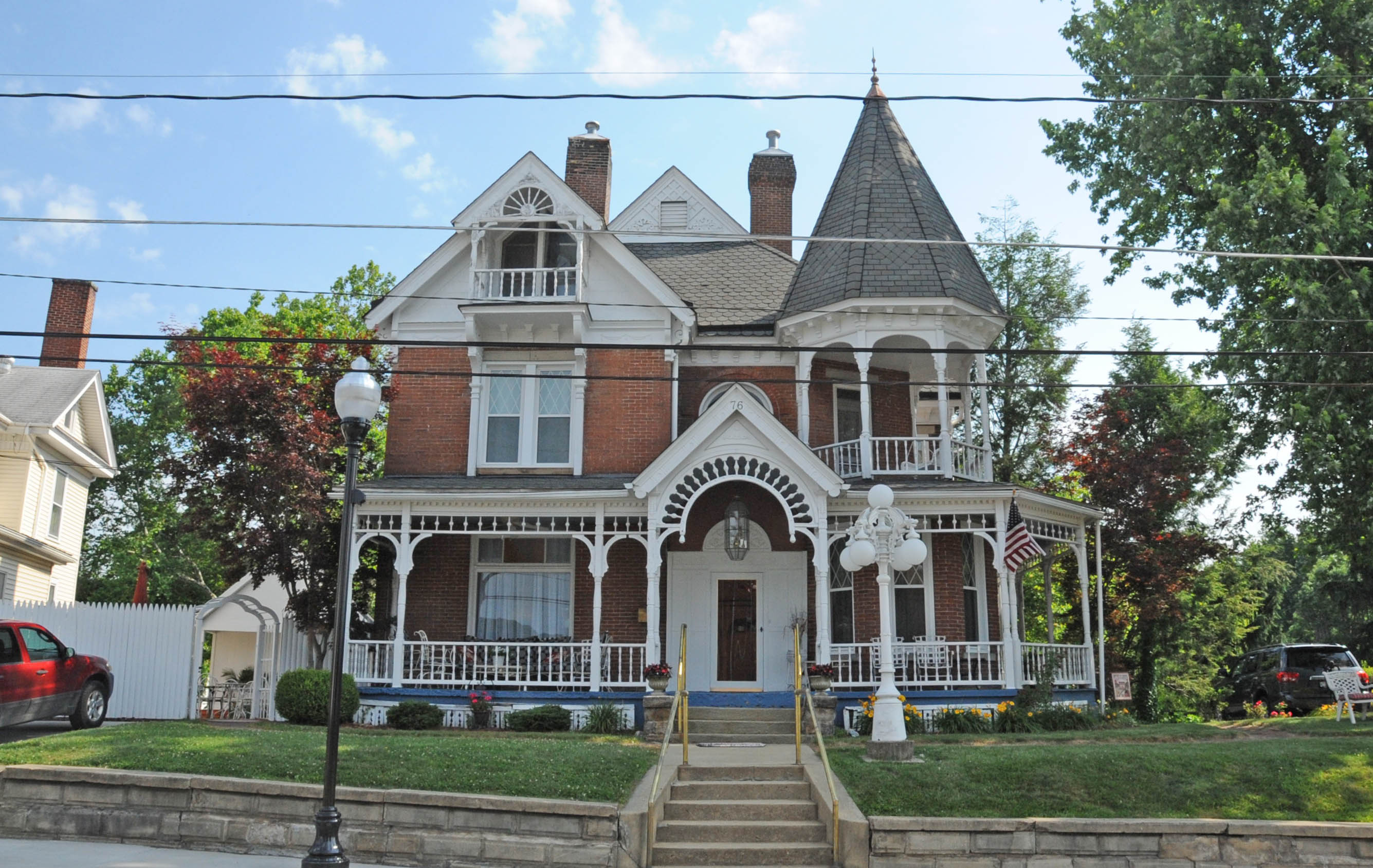

- Location within West Virginia Location within the United States
- Location: Roughly bounded by College Ave., S. Kanawha, Madison, & E. Main Sts., Buckhannon, West Virginia
- Coordinates: 38.991°N 80.225°W
- Area: 110 acres (45 ha)
- Built: c. 1866-1945
- Built by: Coyner, Bob; Post, Dr. Orne; Post, Rolandus;
- Architect: Hughes, Draper Camden
- Architectural style: Greek Revival, Gothic Revival, Late Victorian, Colonial Revival, Tudor Revival, Bungalow
- NRHP reference No.: 12000225
- Added to NRHP: April 16, 2012

Buckhannon Central Residential Historic District is a national historic district located at Buckhannon, Upshur County, West Virginia. The district encompasses 344 contributing buildings, 2 contributing sites, 11 contributing structures, and 2 contributing objects in Buckhannon. It consists of primarily single family residential homes dating from the mid-19th through mid-20th century. They are in variety of popular architectural styles including Greek Revival, Gothic Revival, Late Victorian, Colonial Revival, Tudor Revival, and Bungalow. Notable contributing resources include historic brick sidewalks, Works Progress Administration sidewalks and logos, Jawbone Park, the Charles Gibson City Library building, the Liberty in Christ Church (1873), First United Methodist Church (1910), the First Baptist Church (c. 1911), the African Methodist Episcopal (AME) Church (1919), Victoria or Central School, and 79 East Main Street (1909).

It was listed on the National Register of Historic Places in 2012.
