= Southern Methodist Church Building =

Historic church in West Virginia, United States

- U.S. National Register of Historic Places
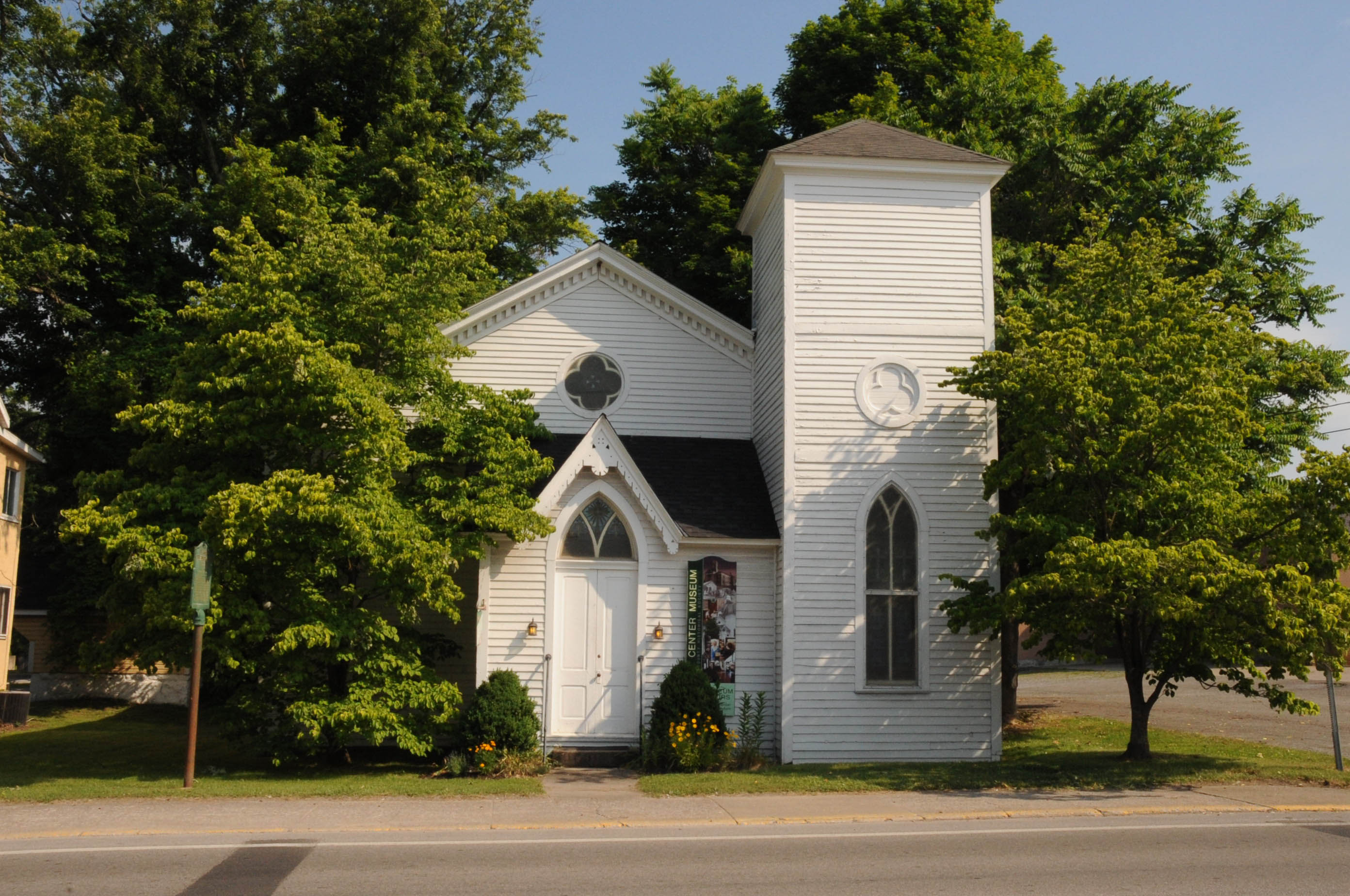

- Location within West Virginia Location within the United States
- Location: 81 W. Main St., Buckhannon, West Virginia
- Coordinates: 38°59′36″N 80°14′1″W
- Area: less than one acre
- Built: 1856
- Architectural style: Greek Revival, Gothic
- NRHP reference No.: 92000898
- Added to NRHP: July 29, 1992

The Southern Methodist Church Building, now known and used as the Upshur County Historical Society's History Center Museum, is an historic former church building located at 81 W. Main Street in Buckhannon, Upshur County, West Virginia. It was built in 1856 with final modifications in the 1890s, and is a simple rectangular frame building. The original structure measures 45 feet by 33 feet in the Greek Revival style. In 1891, a 9 feet by 14 feet vestibule was added, along with a three-story bell tower. In 1968, it was sold to the Church of Christ and then sold to the Upshur County Historical Society in 1986.

It was listed on the National Register of Historic Places in 1992.
