= Nellis Historic District =

Historic district in West Virginia, United States

- U.S. National Register of Historic Places
- U.S. Historic district
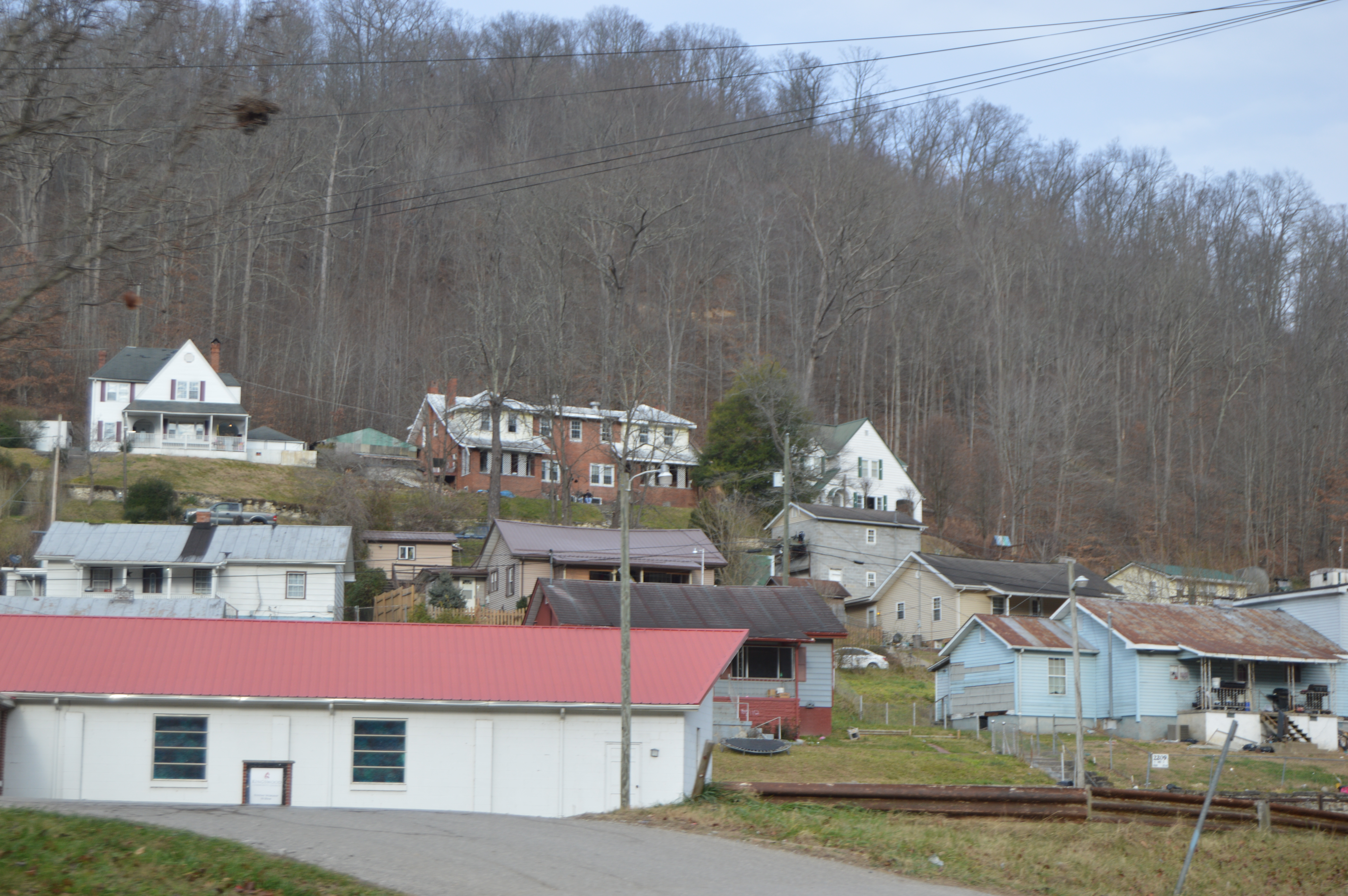
- Houses east of the company store

- Location within West Virginia Location within the United States
- Location: Off Cty Rte. 1, Nellis, West Virginia
- Coordinates: 38°9′17″N 81°44′29″W
- Area: 95 acres (38 ha)
- Built: 1920-1955
- Architect: Minter Homes Corp.
- Architectural style: Company housing
- NRHP reference No.: 00000292
- Added to NRHP: March 24, 2000

Nellis Historic District is a national historic district located at Nellis, Boone County, West Virginia. It encompasses 82 contributing buildings, three contributing structures, and one contributing object. The district includes the commercial, ecclesiastical, and residential buildings built by the Nellis Coal Company as a planned community between 1920 and 1955. The community was a model for coal communities in Boone County and the southern coal fields. Included in the district is the Nellis Church / Nellis Archives (1926), stone wall constructed by the Works Progress Administration (c. 1935), coal company storage building (c. 1945), Nellis Company Store and Offices (1922), community bulletin board (c. 1921), Superintendent's House (c. 1925), and clubhouse (c. 1925).

It was listed on the National Register of Historic Places in 2000.
