= Arlington, Upshur County, West Virginia =

Unincorporated community in West Virginia, United States

Arlington
- Unincorporated community
- Location within the state of West Virginia Arlington (the United States)
- Coordinates: 38°48′0″N 80°20′35″W
- Country: United States
- State: West Virginia
- County: Upshur
- Elevation: 1,499 ft (457 m)
- Time zone: UTC-5 (Eastern (EST))
  - Summer (DST): UTC-4 (EDT)
- GNIS feature ID: 1535006

Arlington is an unincorporated community along the Little Kanawha River in Upshur County, West Virginia, United States. Alfious Arlington Fidler, an early postmaster, gave the town his middle name. Its nineteenth century Fidler's Mill is listed on the National Register of Historic Places. Arlington is located south of Rock Cave.

Arlington's public schools are operated by Upshur County Schools.
