= Sand Ridge, West Virginia =

- Unincorporated community
- Location within the state of West Virginia Sand Ridge (the United States)
- Coordinates: 38°48′6″N 81°4′0″W
- Country: United States
- State: West Virginia
- County: Calhoun
- Time zone: UTC-5 (Eastern (EST))
  - Summer (DST): UTC-4 (EDT)

Sand Ridge (also Sandridge) is an unincorporated community in Calhoun County, West Virginia, United States. It lies along U.S. Route 33 to the south of the town of Grantsville, the county seat of Calhoun County. Its elevation is 1,168 feet (356 m).

The community was named for the sandy character of the soil in the area. It is the site of the Round Methodist Church on the National Register, built round by the Poling family "so the devil would have no place to hide." Its post office is now closed.

== See also ==
- Alberts Chapel
