= William Post Mansion =

Historic house in West Virginia, United States

- U.S. National Register of Historic Places
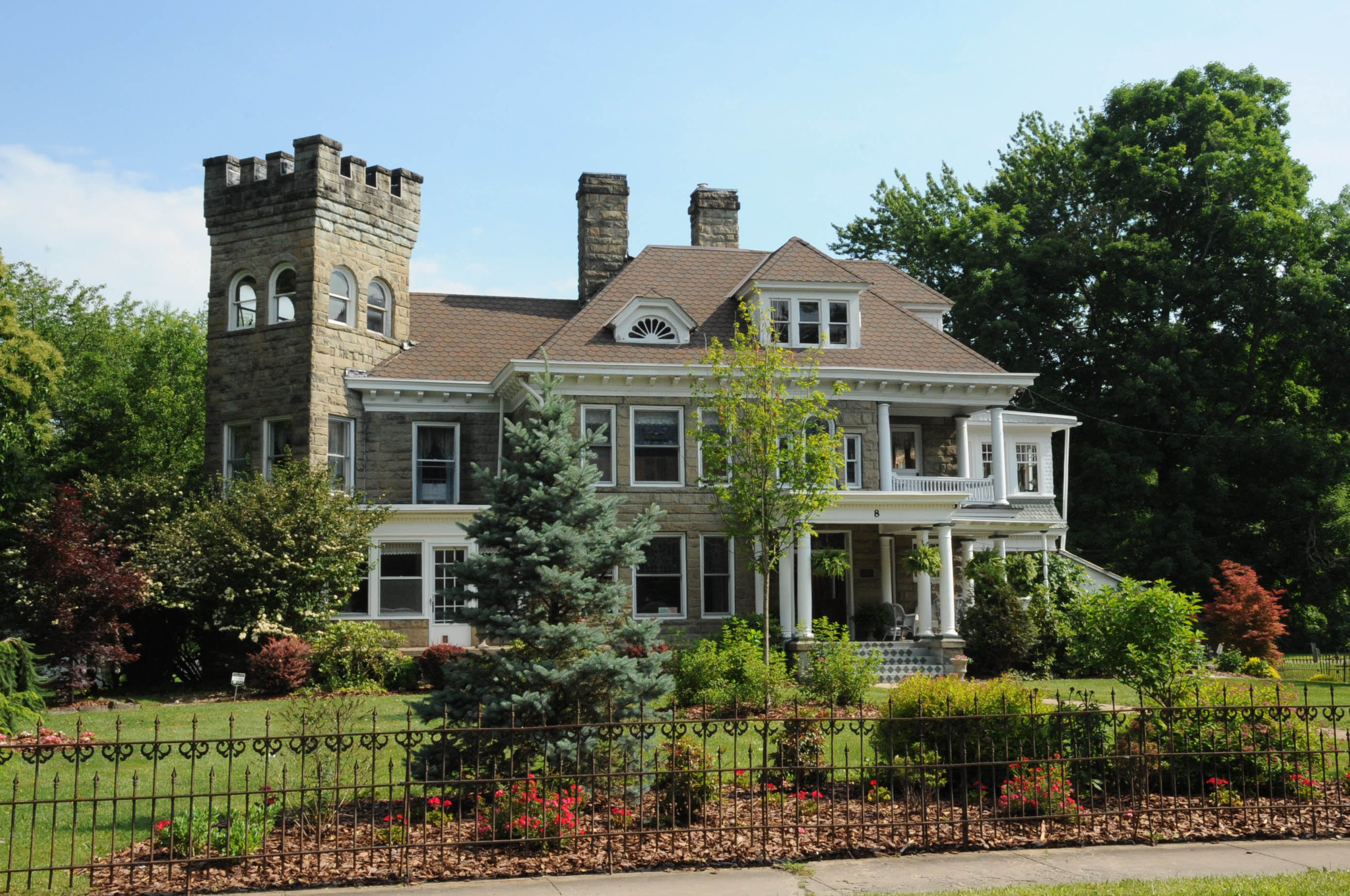

- Location within West Virginia Location within the United States
- Location: 8 Island Ave., Buckhannon, West Virginia
- Coordinates: 38°59′45″N 80°13′36″W
- Area: 5.3 acres (2.1 ha)
- Built: 1891
- Architect: Hughs, Draper
- Architectural style: Classical Revival, Gothic Revival
- NRHP reference No.: 93000619
- Added to NRHP: July 13, 1993

William Post Mansion, also known as the Post Mansion Inn, is a historic home located at Buckhannon, Upshur County, West Virginia. It was originally built in the 1860s and extensively renovated in 1891 in the Neo-Classical Revival style. It is a 2 1/2-story, brick dwelling with a three-story stone tower. The front facade features a portico with Doric order columns. A gymnasium was built over the porte cochere and a carport was added in the 1930s. Also on the property are a number of outbuildings related to a dairy, including a corn crib/granary, hay barn, one large equipment shed and two additional storage sheds The property also has a guest house and a rustic gazebo.

It was listed on the National Register of Historic Places in 1993.
