= Wyco Church =

Historic church in West Virginia, United States

- U.S. National Register of Historic Places
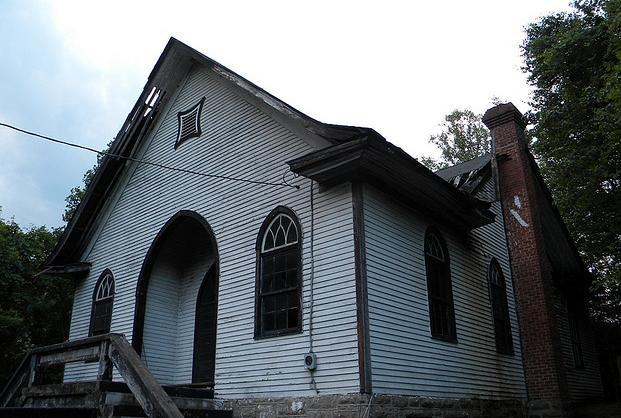
- Wyco Church, August 2008

- Location within West Virginia Location within the United States
- Location: County Route 12/1, approximately 1 mile north of County Route 16, near Mullens, West Virginia
- Coordinates: 37°35′56″N 81°20′34″W
- Area: less than one acre
- Built: 1917
- Architectural style: Late Gothic Revival
- NRHP reference No.: 10000168
- Added to NRHP: March 31, 2010

Wyco Church, also known as Wyco Community Church, Wyco Independent Church, Wyco Freewill Baptist Church, and Wyco Independent Baptist Church, is a historic Baptist church located near Mullens, Wyoming County, West Virginia. It was built in 1917, and is a rectangular frame building with a front gable-roof and set a cut sandstone foundation. It is clad in wood clapboard and features lancet windows and a prominent, recessed entrance in the Late Gothic Revival style. It was constructed by Coal Baron Major W.T. Tam's carpenters for use by coal miners and their families at the Wyco coal town .

It was listed on the National Register of Historic Places in 2010.
