= Wyco, West Virginia =

Community in West Virginia, US

Wyco
- Unincorporated community
- Location within the state of West Virginia Wyco (the United States)
- Coordinates: 37°35′53″N 81°20′30″W
- Country: United States
- State: West Virginia
- County: Wyoming
- Time zone: UTC-5 (Eastern (EST))
  - Summer (DST): UTC-4 (EDT)
- ZIP codes: 25943
- GNIS feature ID: 1556030

Wyco is an unincorporated community in Wyoming County, West Virginia, United States. Some say the community derives its name from Wyoming County, while others believe the community was named for the Wyoming Coal Company. It is located off West Virginia Route 16. The Wyco Church is also located within Wyco.

== Notable person ==
- Bernie Casey (1939-2017), actor and American football player
