= Glenville, West Virginia =

- Town
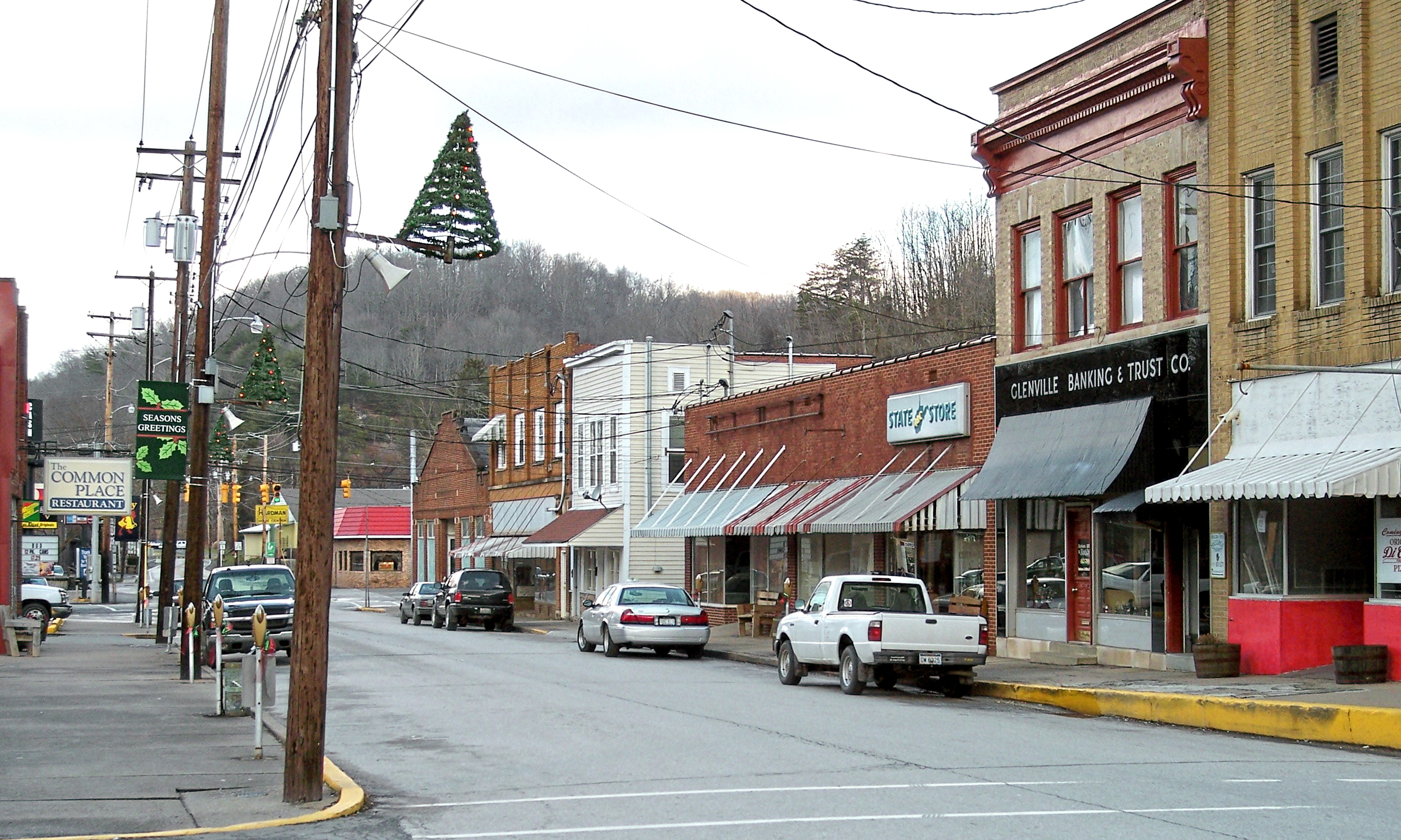
- Main Street in Glenville in 2006

- Seal
- Interactive map of Glenville, West Virginia
- Location within West Virginia Location within the United States
- Coordinates: 38°56′7″N 80°50′14″W
- Country: United States
- State: West Virginia
- County: Gilmer
- Chartered: 1856
- Incorporated: February 13, 1871

Government
  - Mayor: Matt Butcher (sworn in on 9.14.2026 to replace Mark Sarver)

Area
  - Total: 1.03 sq mi (2.68 km^{2})
  - Land: 1.00 sq mi (2.58 km^{2})
  - Water: 0.039 sq mi (0.10 km^{2})
- Elevation: 725 ft (221 m)

Population (2020)
  - Total: 1,129
  - Estimate (2021): 1,112
  - Density: 1,438.6/sq mi (555.44/km^{2})
- Time zone: UTC-5 (Eastern (EST))
  - Summer (DST): UTC-4 (EDT)
- ZIP code: 26351
- Area code: 304
- FIPS code: 54-32044
- GNIS feature ID: 1539468
- Website: glenvillewv.gov

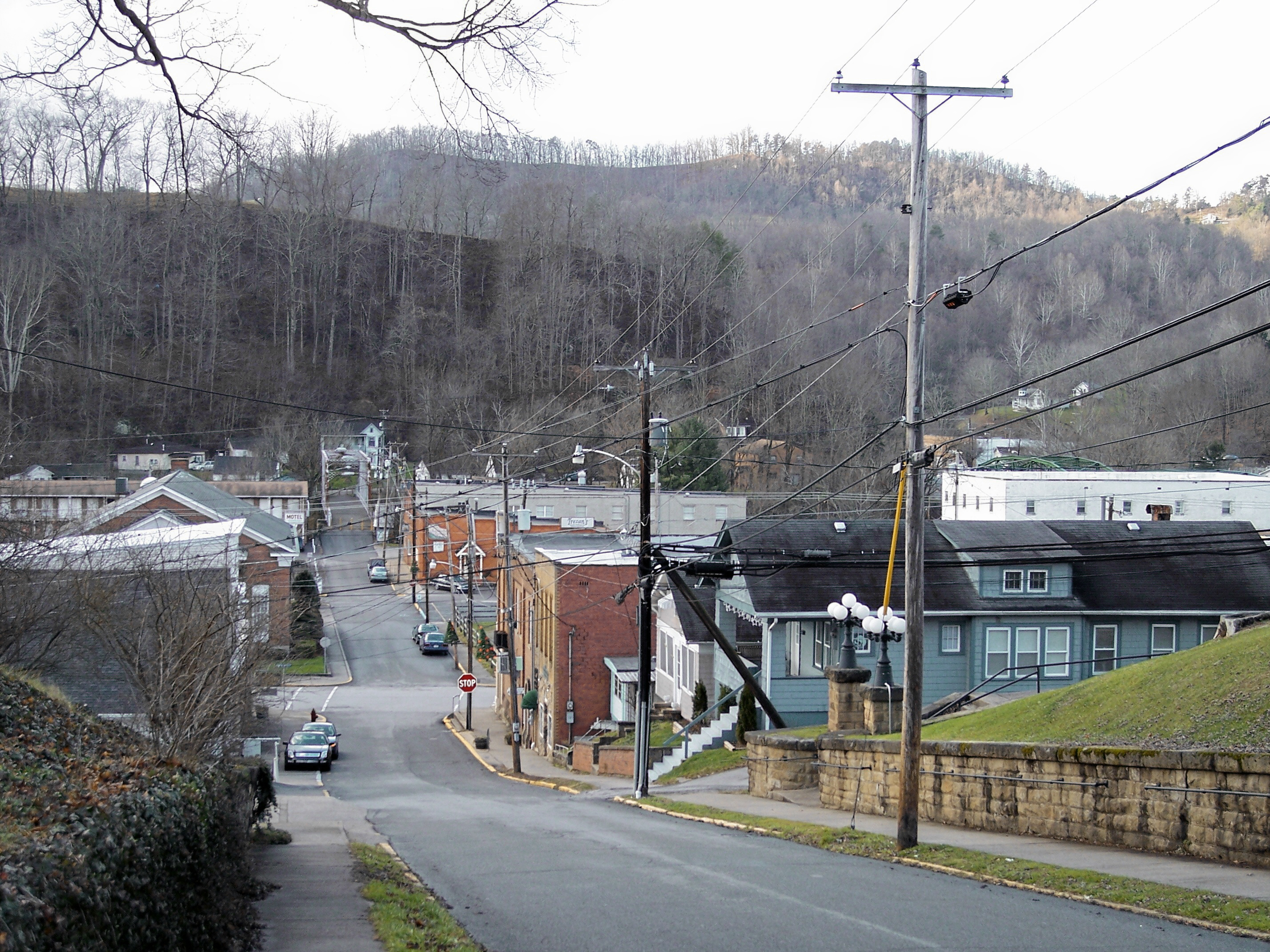
Glenville as viewed from Court Street in 2006

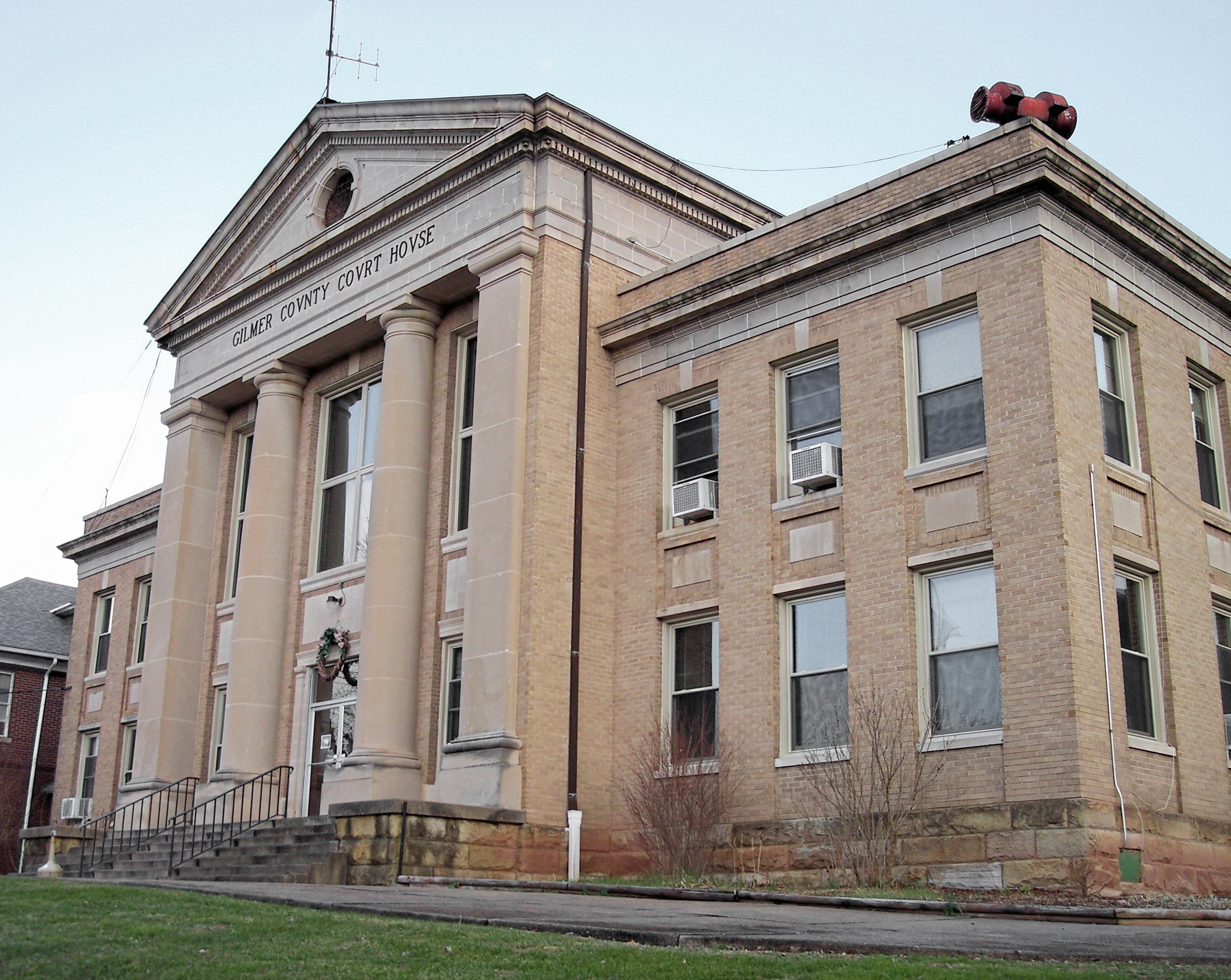
The Gilmer County Courthouse in Glenville

Glenville is a town in and the county seat of Gilmer County, West Virginia, United States, along the Little Kanawha River. The population was 1,128 at the 2020 census. It is the home of Glenville State University.

== History ==
In the late 1700s and early 1800s, pioneers began settling in the area they called ‘‘the Ford’’ because it was a place where travelers could cross the river. Later, the community was named Glenville because of its location in a glen. The first grist mill in present-day Gilmer County was constructed there in 1812. The first courthouse was completed in 1850, the second in 1872, and the current courthouse in 1923. Glenville was incorporated in 1856.

Before the 1930s, the Little Kanawha River’s commercial traffic dominated the town’s economy. Road construction contributed to the demise of riverboating by the late 1930s. The natural gas and oil industry rose to prominence after oil was struck in 1875 at nearby Letter Gap. Glenville is now the headquarters of several oil and gas firms. The 1985 flood devastated the downtown, leading many businesses to move to the higher Hays City neighborhood at the main highway intersection.

The Little Kanawha Valley Bank was incorporated in 1901. Its small frame building, covered in pressed metal, is now on the National Register of Historic Places. By 1906, the First National Bank of Glenville and the Glenville Banking and Trust Company had also been created. Glenville is now served by United Bank and a branch of Calhoun Banks of Grantsville.

Early Methodist circuit riders and Baptist missionaries brought their respective forms of worship to Glenville early in the 19th century. The Presbyterian Church was organized in 1847; the First Baptist Church, 1850; and Trinity United Methodist Church, 1896. Several other churches also serve the area today. Glenville has a golf club and recreation center, among several other facilities built at the old county poor farm.

In 1885, the Glenville Crescent first published Ellen King’s poem, ‘‘The West Virginia Hills,’’ which later became the official state song. While this newspaper didn't survive, the Glenville Pathfinder (1892) and the Glenville Democrat (1904) have.

The flood of 1985 devastated all of Glenville. A late season tropical storm named Juan moved North leaving abundant moisture over the Southeast. On Sunday, November 3, another storm formed in Southeastern Georgia. This new storm tapped into the moisture left by Juan. By November 4, a large area of rain began to form from the Western North Carolina to Southern West Virginia. The storm's center slowly moved north, over central West Virginia. Rainfall rates of 3 to 6 inches in 12 hours were observed over the headwaters of the Potomac, Greenbrier, and Little Kanawha rivers.

On Monday night, November 5, severe flooding took place and by midnight the rain became lighter, but by then flooding had begun. All of downtown Glenville was affected. Stores were closed, and buildings were flooded. Shopkeepers attempted to save their stock by piling sandbags up to stop the water, but to little avail. 47 people died to the 1985 flooding. Most of the deaths were in rural Pendleton County and Grant County, according to the National Weather Service.

On January 22–23, 2016 Glenville was impacted by the January 2016 United States blizzard. The storm dropped a total of 19 inches of snow in the area.

== Geography ==
Glenville is located at 38°56′7″N 80°50′14″W (38.935405, -80.837114).

According to the United States Census Bureau, the town has a total area of 1.04 square miles (2.69 km^{2}), of which 1.00 square mile (2.59 km^{2}) is land and 0.04 square miles (0.10 km^{2}) is water.

=== Climate ===
Climate data for Glenville, West Virginia, 1991–2020 normals, extremes 1891–present
Month	Jan	Feb	Mar	Apr	May	Jun	Jul	Aug	Sep	Oct	Nov	Dec	Year
Record high °F (°C)	80 (27)	82 (28)	91 (33)	95 (35)	99 (37)	101 (38)	107 (42)	107 (42)	104 (40)	95 (35)	86 (30)	82 (28)	107 (42)
Mean maximum °F (°C)	67.5 (19.7)	70.3 (21.3)	78.1 (25.6)	85.7 (29.8)	88.7 (31.5)	91.3 (32.9)	92.8 (33.8)	92.7 (33.7)	91.1 (32.8)	74.5 (23.6)	77.9 (25.5)	68.5 (20.3)	94.2 (34.6)
Mean daily maximum °F (°C)	42.0 (5.6)	45.8 (7.7)	54.9 (12.7)	67.3 (19.6)	75.0 (23.9)	81.9 (27.7)	85.2 (29.6)	84.6 (29.2)	79.2 (26.2)	68.5 (20.3)	56.4 (13.6)	45.9 (7.7)	65.6 (18.7)
Daily mean °F (°C)	32.2 (0.1)	35.0 (1.7)	42.6 (5.9)	53.4 (11.9)	62.4 (16.9)	70.5 (21.4)	74.3 (23.5)	73.4 (23.0)	67.0 (19.4)	55.5 (13.1)	44.2 (6.8)	36.3 (2.4)	53.9 (12.2)
Mean daily minimum °F (°C)	22.4 (−5.3)	24.2 (−4.3)	30.3 (−0.9)	39.4 (4.1)	49.7 (9.8)	59.1 (15.1)	63.4 (17.4)	62.2 (16.8)	54.7 (12.6)	42.6 (5.9)	32.0 (0.0)	26.8 (−2.9)	42.2 (5.7)
Mean minimum °F (°C)	1.2 (−17.1)	5.0 (−15.0)	13.0 (−10.6)	25.1 (−3.8)	33.4 (0.8)	46.2 (7.9)	53.6 (12.0)	52.6 (11.4)	41.9 (5.5)	28.7 (−1.8)	18.2 (−7.7)	10.8 (−11.8)	−2.3 (−19.1)
Record low °F (°C)	−25 (−32)	−29 (−34)	−12 (−24)	8 (−13)	22 (−6)	31 (−1)	38 (3)	37 (3)	29 (−2)	12 (−11)	0 (−18)	−25 (−32)	−29 (−34)
Average precipitation inches (mm)	3.50 (89)	3.28 (83)	4.34 (110)	3.87 (98)	5.01 (127)	4.67 (119)	4.93 (125)	3.95 (100)	3.64 (92)	3.11 (79)	3.14 (80)	3.67 (93)	47.11 (1,195)
Average snowfall inches (cm)	8.1 (21)	5.0 (13)	4.1 (10)	0.1 (0.25)	0.0 (0.0)	0.0 (0.0)	0.0 (0.0)	0.0 (0.0)	0.0 (0.0)	0.0 (0.0)	0.8 (2.0)	4.0 (10)	22.1 (56.25)
Average precipitation days (≥ 0.01 in)	15.3	13.6	13.7	14.0	14.0	12.8	12.6	10.6	9.4	10.4	11.5	14.4	152.3
Average snowy days (≥ 0.1 in)	6.0	3.8	2.1	0.1	0.0	0.0	0.0	0.0	0.0	0.0	0.7	3.8	16.5
Source 1: NOAA
Source 2: National Weather Service

== Demographics ==
Historical population
Census	Pop.	Note	%±
1860	398		—
1870	174		−56.3%
1880	236		35.6%
1890	329		39.4%
1900	398		21.0%
1910	336		−15.6%
1920	327		−2.7%
1930	799		144.3%
1940	588		−26.4%
1950	1,789		204.3%
1960	1,828		2.2%
1970	2,183		19.4%
1980	2,155		−1.3%
1990	1,923		−10.8%
2000	1,544		−19.7%
2010	1,537		−0.5%
2020	1,129		−26.5%
2021 (est.)	1,112	▼	−1.5%
U.S. Decennial Census

=== 2010 census ===
As of the census of 2010, there were 1,537 people, 540 households, and 250 families living in the town. The population density was 1,537.0 inhabitants per square mile (593.4/km^{2}). There were 624 housing units at an average density of 624.0 per square mile (240.9/km^{2}). The racial makeup of the town was 90.0% White, 6.3% African American, 0.3% Native American, 0.3% Asian, 0.5% Pacific Islander, 0.5% from other races, and 2.1% from two or more races. Hispanic or Latino of any race were 2.1% of the population.

There were 540 households, of which 22.2% had children under the age of 18 living with them, 29.4% were married couples living together, 12.0% had a female householder with no husband present, 4.8% had a male householder with no wife present, and 53.7% were non-families. 36.5% of all households were made up of individuals, and 8.3% had someone living alone who was 65 years of age or older. The average household size was 2.15 and the average family size was 2.91.

The median age in the town was 24 years. 14.1% of residents were under the age of 18; 38.1% were between the ages of 18 and 24; 20.5% were from 25 to 44; 15.7% were from 45 to 64; and 11.5% were 65 years of age or older. The gender makeup of the town was 53.0% male and 47.0% female.

=== 2000 census ===
As of the census of 2000, there were 1,544 people, 527 households, and 235 families living in the town. The population density was 1,428.7 inhabitants per square mile (552.0/km^{2}). There were 654 housing units at an average density of 605.2 per square mile (233.8/km^{2}). The racial makeup of the town was 92.75% White, 3.17% African American, 0.13% Native American, 2.40% Asian, 0.26% from other races, and 1.30% from two or more races. Hispanic or Latino of any race were 0.58% of the population.

There were 527 households, out of which 17.6% had children under the age of 18 living with them, 31.1% were married couples living together, 9.1% had a female householder with no husband present, and 55.4% were non-families. 36.8% of all households were made up of individuals, and 12.9% had someone living alone who was 65 years of age or older. The average household size was 2.10 and the average family size was 2.82.

In the town, the population was spread out, with 11.9% under the age of 18, 43.1% from 18 to 24, 16.1% from 25 to 44, 14.5% from 45 to 64, and 14.4% who were 65 years of age or older. The median age was 23 years. For every 100 females, there were 101.0 males. For every 100 females age 18 and over, there were 105.1 males.

The median income for a household in the town was $20,243, and the median income for a family was $33,036. Males had a median income of $24,583 versus $18,375 for females. The per capita income for the town was $10,304. About 21.5% of families and 38.5% of the population were below the poverty line, including 44.9% of those under age 18 and 13.8% of those age 65 or over.

== Education ==
As early as 1833, a high school was established in the Methodist Episcopal Church. After moving to the courthouse in 1850 and into a house in 1884, the school got its own building in 1913. Glenville High School was replaced by the consolidated Gilmer County High School in 1968. What is now Glenville State University was founded in 1872.

== Culture ==
In 1950, folklorist Patrick Gainer established the West Virginia State Folk Festival at the college. It has been held each June since then, making it one of the two oldest such events in the United States.

== Climate ==
The climate in this area is characterized by hot, humid summers and generally mild to cool winters. According to the Köppen Climate Classification system, Glenville has a humid subtropical climate, abbreviated "Cfa" on climate maps.
