= Blackwater Canyon =

Gorge in West Virginia

Coordinates: 39°05′47″N 79°32′51″W

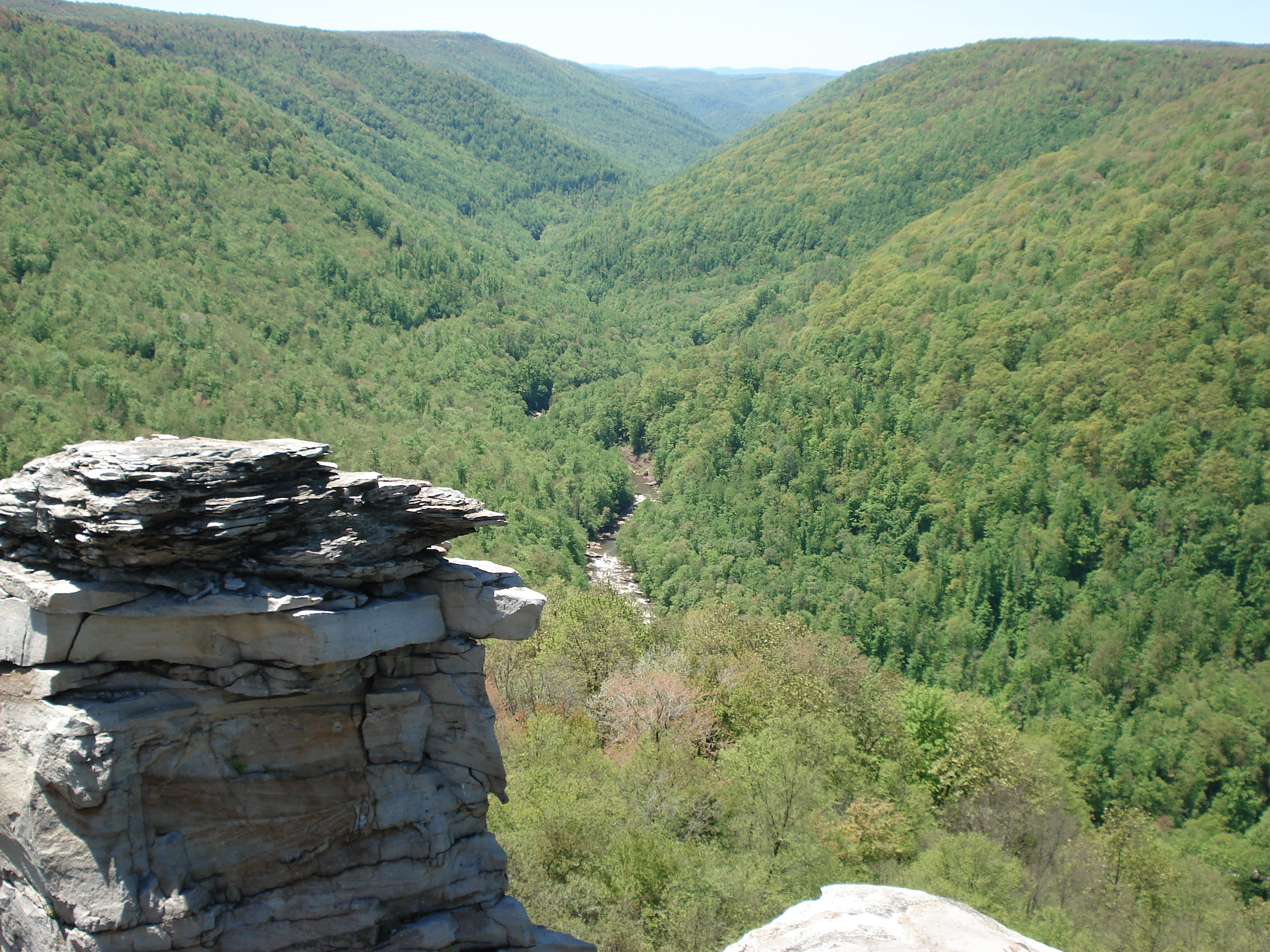
The Blackwater Canyon, West Virginia; View from Lindy Point looking southwest (downstream)

Blackwater Canyon is a rugged, heavily wooded, eight-mile (13 km) long gorge carved by the Blackwater River in the Allegheny Mountains of eastern West Virginia, USA. For many years, it has been the object of controversy as environmental activists have contended with industrial (power, timber, development) interests over its ultimate status.

== Description ==
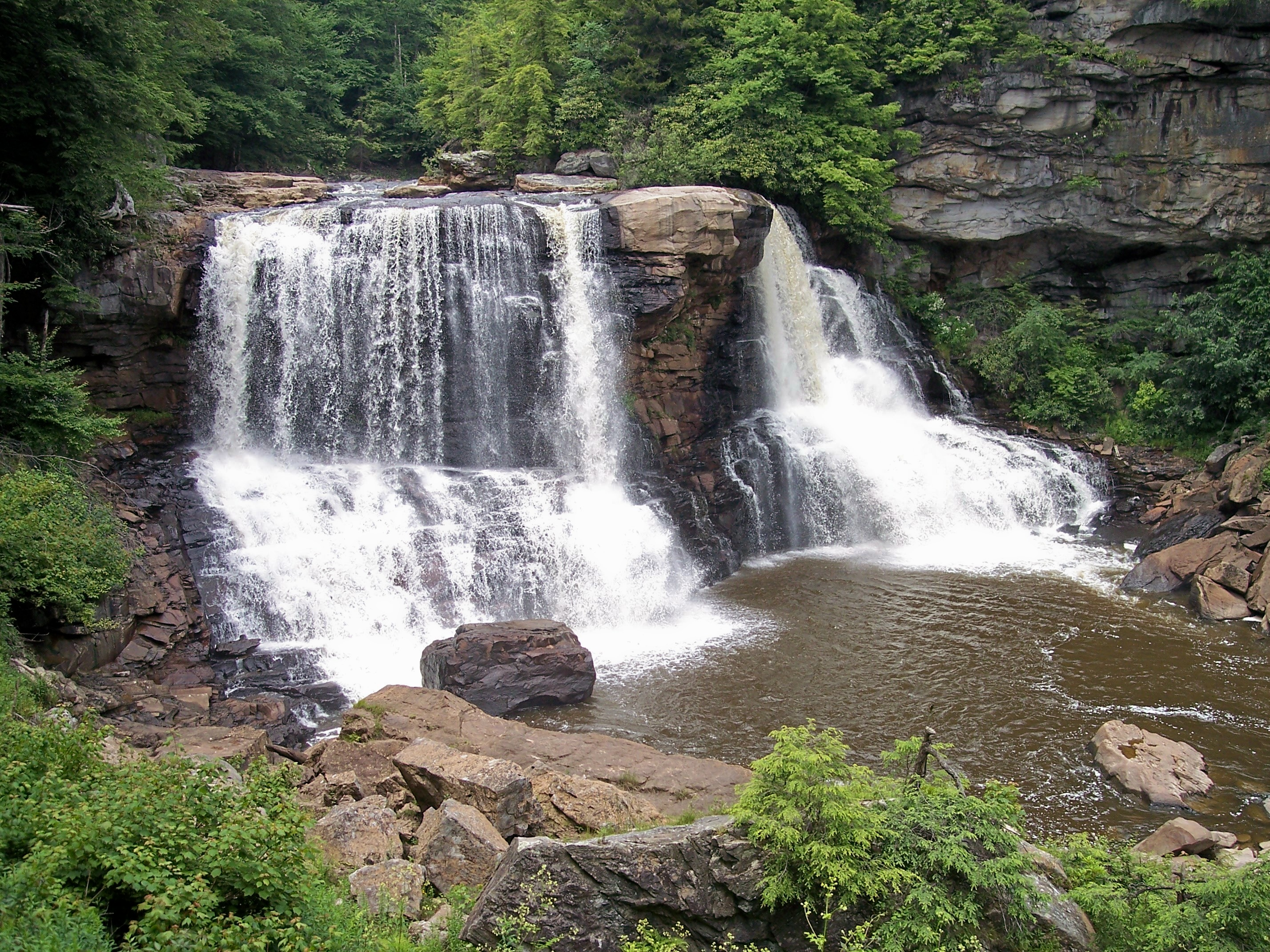
Blackwater Falls at the head of Blackwater Canyon

The canyon extends from the foot of Blackwater Falls near Davis to the confluence of the Blackwater River with Dry Fork (forming the Black Fork) near Hendricks, dropping about 1,250 feet (380 m) from 3,000 ft (910 m) to 1,750 ft (530 m). It is a 1,000-foot (300 m) deep chasm separating Backbone Mountain (to the northwest) from Canaan Mountain (to the southeast). (This affords kayakers a whitewater river with Class IV-V+ [upper Blackwater] and Class III-IV [lower Blackwater] rapids). Tributary streams – notably Pendleton Creek and Shay's Run – have formed hanging valleys high above the canyon floor.

The land embracing the canyon consists of about 6,000 acres (24 km^{2}) of spruce, hemlock and pine upland, second-growth forest. Oak, maple, yellow poplar, and rhododendron also predominate. Black bear inhabit the canyon, along with white-tail deer, squirrel, numerous bird species, and timber rattlesnake dens. Wildflowers (soapwort, jewelweed) abound.

The Western Maryland Railway's Black Fork Grade, which once ran the length of the canyon, has been converted into a hiking trail, the 12.2-mile (19.6 km) Blackwater Canyon Railroad Grade Trail (USFS Trail 115), which connects with the Allegheny Trail near its northern end. The trail crosses three major tributaries on culverts that feature views of cascades: Tub Run at about 3 miles (4.8 km), Big Run at 4 miles (6.4 km) and Flatrock Run at 5.5 miles (8.9 km).

Trails on both sides of the canyon lead down to several sections of spectacular rapids. In addition, on the northwestern canyon rim is the Canyon Rim Trail (USFS Trail 117), accessed by Canyon Rim Road, with its Big Run Overlook. Intermediate between rim and rapids is Limerock Trail (USFS Trail 142), which descends gradually into the canyon over about 4 miles (6.4 km).

== History ==
=== 19th century ===
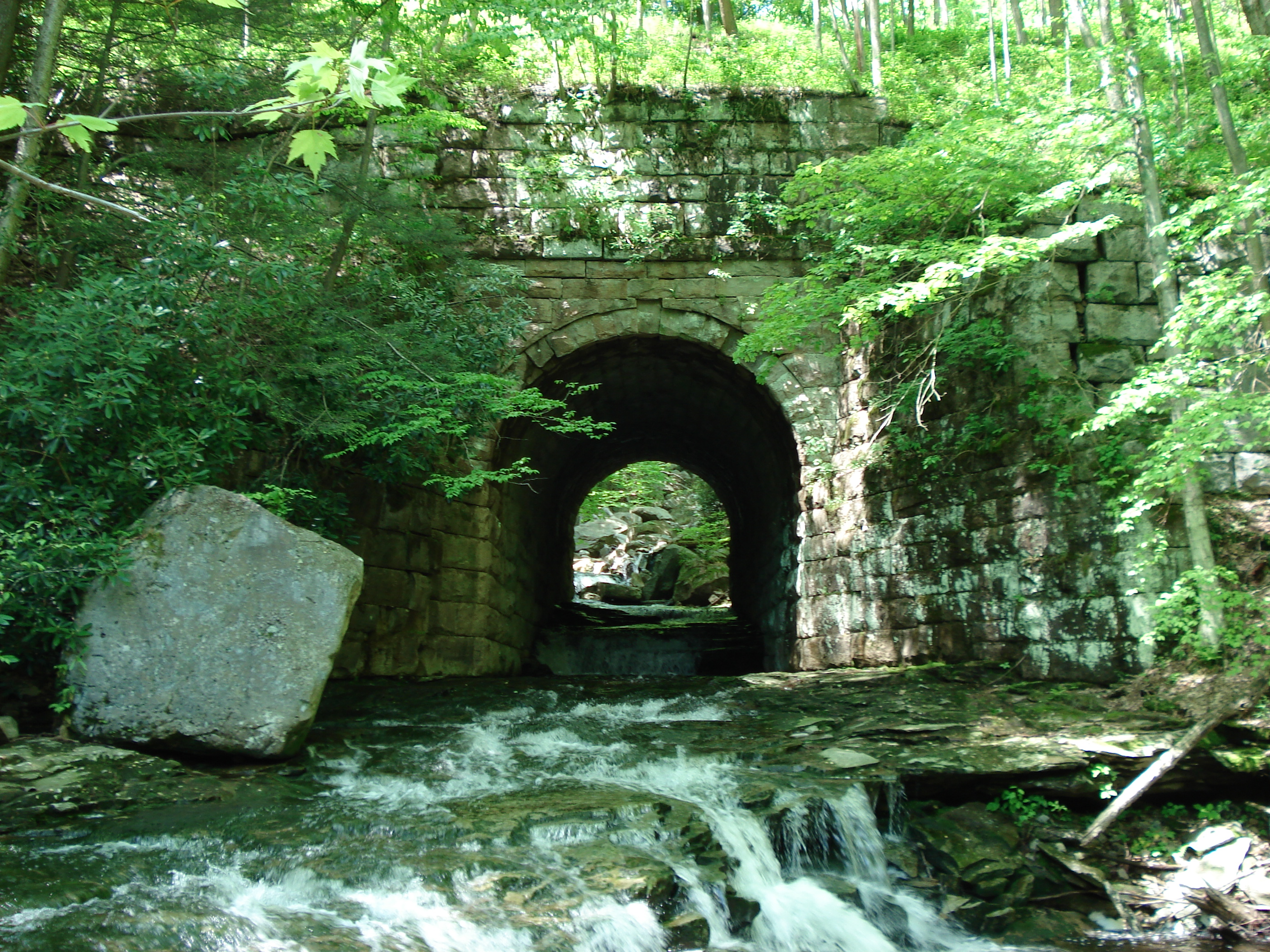
The massive stone culvert (1888–89) at Big Run in Blackwater Canyon

The "High Allegheny" region (what is now east-central West Virginia), including Blackwater Canyon, was bypassed by development for many decades as large-scale settlement occurred to its north, south and west while the region itself remained relatively wild. The Canyon first came to widespread public attention in the mid-19th century. In 1853, travel writer Philip Pendleton Kennedy reported in glowing terms on an “expedition” to the remote gorge. Two years later, illustrator David Hunter Strother (“Porte Crayon”) wrote, and Harper's Monthly published, “The Virginia Canaan” about his adventures in the Blackwater Canyon and surrounding areas. For his readers, Strother depicted mountainous vistas of immense spruce and hardwood stands, thick laurels and rhododendrons and an untamed canyon carved by a wild, raging river.

In 1881, coal and timber magnate (and former U.S. Senator) Henry Gassaway Davis and his West Virginia Central and Pittsburgh Railway Company laid first tracks in eastern West Virginia. By 1884, the railroad had extended along the North Branch of the Potomac River to the North Fork of the Blackwater River at the newly formed town of Thomas. In 1888, Davis decided to continue expanding this line southward from Thomas through the rugged Blackwater Canyon to Hendricks. This astonishing feat, accomplished over the course of a year, required excavating road cuts sometimes hundreds of feet high into Backbone Mountain. To allow the rail to traverse several deep ravines and rushing tributaries, a number of gigantic stone archways and culverts were constructed. The most impressive of these is located at Big Run. It is about 60 feet (18 m) long, 25 feet (7.6 m) wide and 30 feet (9.1 m) high. Several wrecks and derailments occurred in the vicinity of the Big Run culvert, owing to the sharpness of the curve that trains had to negotiate at this point.

=== 20th century ===
The railroad, which was taken over in 1905 by the Western Maryland Railroad, brought industry and expansion to the area. Along the line came towns, such as Douglas, Limerock and Coketon, as the coal mines, coke ovens, and timber industry brought an influx of workers.

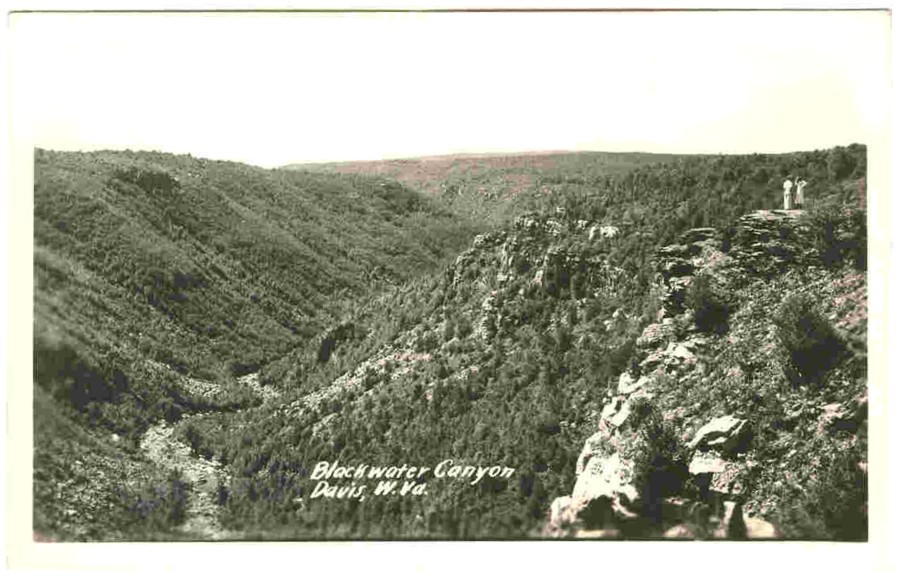
leftBlackwater Canyon (postcard of circa 1930)

Over the next two decades, Davis's interests prospered, but at the cost of devastating environmental damage. Much of Tucker County, including Canaan Valley and the Canyon, were clear-cut, and the landscape converted into a tinderbox by the residual slashings. By 1910, fires swept over the wasteland, often burning continuously from spring until the first snows. In 1914, with the Canyon virtually denuded of standing trees, the ground burned continually for 6 months. When the fires subsided, thin mineral soil and bare rock were all that remained. Uncontrollable soil erosion and flooding further degraded and depopulated the region. Large-scale clear-cut timbering in the Canyon has not occurred again since 1914.

Establishment of the Monongahela National Forest (MNF) in 1920, and its anti-erosion and forest restoration projects, brought new hope to the region. Owned at the time by West Virginia Power and Transmission Company (later called Allegheny Power Systems) and slated for an elaborate hydroelectric project, the south side of the Canyon was excluded from this large-scale preservation effort. Yet, protected by the adjacent newly established public lands, the Canyon began to recover, as healthy second growth forests regenerated.

During 1943–44, the rugged cliffs of the Canyon were utilized (as were those at nearby Seneca Rocks) by the U.S. Army for mountain climbing instruction. This school, part of the West Virginia Maneuver Area, prepared soldiers for combat in the mountainous terrain of Europe.

From the 1930s to the 1950s, various leases and donations to the state from the power company resulted in the procurement and expansion of the Blackwater Falls State Park (BFSP), which was established in 1937 as a 934 acres (3.78 km^{2}) park at the head of the Canyon, including the renowned 62-foot (19 m) falls. Plans for the damming of the Canyon and its river never materialized and recreationalists were given greater access to the entire Canyon area, but for many years the lower Canyon remained in a state of limbo, neither permanently protected nor developed and exploited by industry.

In 1970, the National Park Service recommended the Canyon for National Natural Landmark status. The railroad became inactive in 1983 and was designated a hiking trail six years later. In 1995, the U.S. Forest Service recommended the Blackwater for Wild and Scenic River status. For the next two years, The Conservation Fund negotiated aggressively with the power company for public ownership of the Canyon by the MNF. However, in 1997, Allegheny Power Systems rejected their offer (of $3.5 million) and sold its 2,750-acre (11.1 km^{2}) tract to a private developer (for $5 million). This developer subsequently resold this holding to Allegheny Wood Products (AWP), an international exporter of Appalachian hardwoods. Initially, AWP began timbering the lower reaches of the canyon and staked out several development sites. When activists expressed concern for the ecological, historical, and recreational losses to be incurred, AWP began to work with government agencies on preserving the natural integrity of the area.

In 2000, the state purchased the Lindy Point overlook as an addition to BFSP, providing public access to the most scenic overlook along the Canyon rim. AWP also granted the state right of first refusal for purchase of additional land in the Canyon, which may be acquired in the future.

=== 21st century ===
As of the early 21st century, outside of the BFSP, about half of the land embracing the Canyon is owned by AWP and about half is owned by the MNF. The AWP has proposed selective cutting on its land, but this has been impeded by environmental activists who propose a protected natural status for the entire Canyon area. In addition AWP requested that the Forest Service grant them an easement to utilize the former railroad grade as a logging haul road.

- In January 2008, then West Virginia Governor Joe Manchin proposed $5 million as the state's share for a possible purchase of Blackwater Canyon. The Manchin Administration said it wanted to protect the scenic area from development.
- On July 30, 2010 the Forest Service issued a Record of Decision (RD) with regard to AWP's request for an easement to the Blackwater Canyon Rail Trail. The RD states that AWP may have access to the trail on a temporary, as needed, basis to perform maintenance and ensure the safety of trail users and emergency vehicles. It also states that it is not to be utilized for any purposes related to logging.
