= Glady Fork =

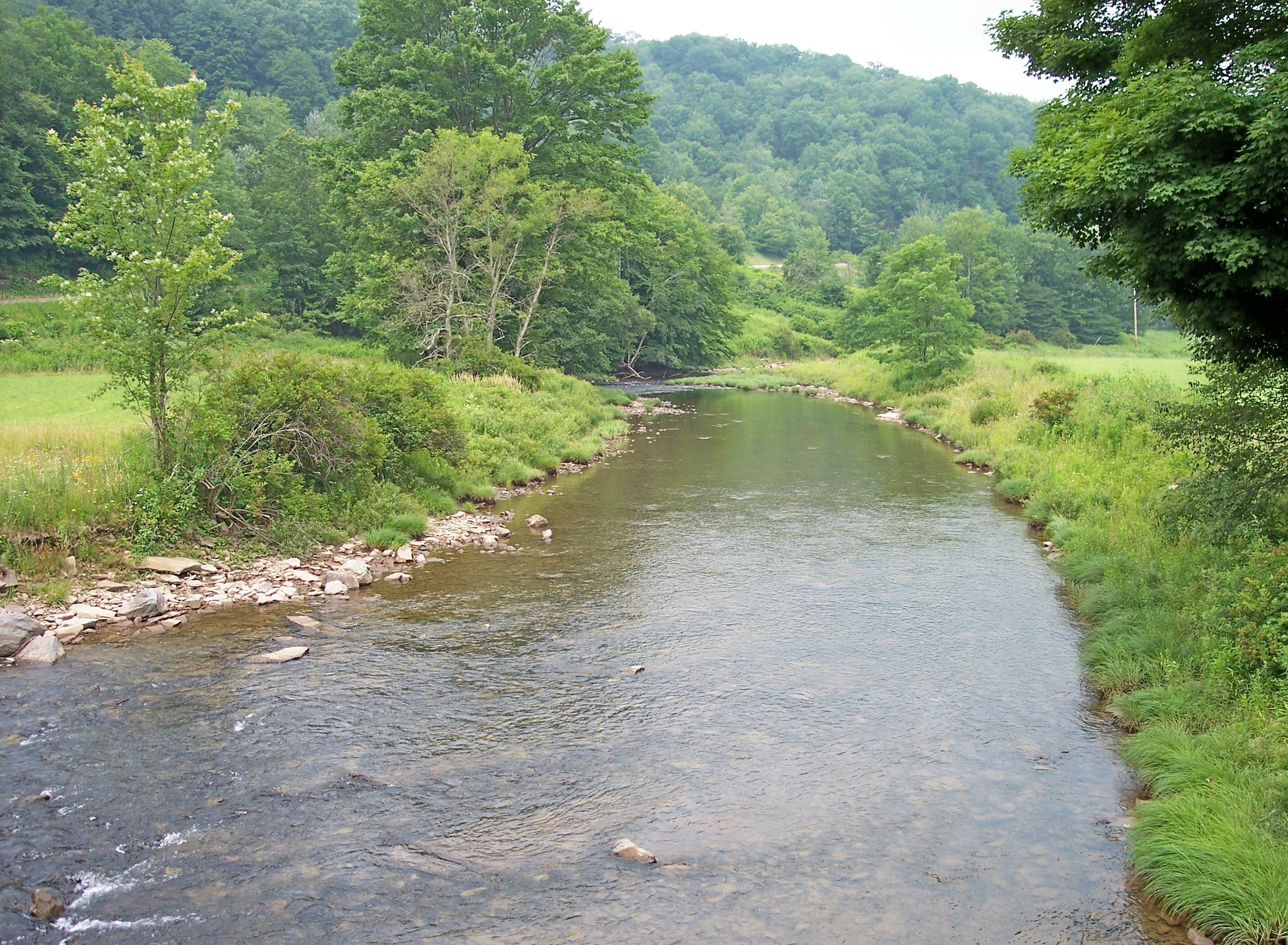
- The Glady Fork in Randolph County in 2006

Location
- Country: United States
- State: West Virginia
- Counties: Randolph, Tucker

Physical characteristics
- Source: West Fork Glady Fork
  - location: Lynn Divide, Randolph County
  - coordinates: 38°44′08″N 79°45′56″W
  - elevation: 3,154 ft (961 m)
- 2nd source: East Fork Glady Fork
  - location: Middle Mountain, Randolph County, WV
  - coordinates: 38°42′48″N 79°44′05″W
  - elevation: 3,707 ft (1,130 m)
- Source confluence
  - location: Glady, WV
  - coordinates: 38°48′03″N 79°43′07″W
  - elevation: 2,841 ft (866 m)
- Mouth: Dry Fork
  - location: Gladwin, WV
  - coordinates: 39°00′33″N 79°32′48″W
  - elevation: 1,946 ft (593 m)
- Length: 32 mi (51 km)
- Basin size: 64 mi^{2} (170 km^{2})

Glady Fork is a 31.9-mile-long (51.3 km) river in the Allegheny Mountains of eastern West Virginia, USA. It is considered one of the five principal headwaters tributaries of the Cheat River — known as the Forks of Cheat.

== Geography ==
The Glady Fork is a tributary of the Dry Fork; via the Dry Fork, the Black Fork, and the Cheat, Monongahela and Ohio rivers, it is part of the watershed of the Mississippi River, draining an area of 64 square miles (170 km^{2}) in the Allegheny Mountains. With the Dry Fork, the Laurel Fork, the Shavers Fork and the Blackwater River, it is considered one of the five principal headwaters tributaries of the Cheat. The stream was named for the presence of glades along the river.

The Glady Fork is formed at the community of Glady in Randolph County by the confluence of two short northward-flowing streams known as East Fork Glady Fork and West Fork Glady Fork; the forks flow from a ridge known as Lynn Divide which separates the Cheat River watershed in Randolph County from the Greenbrier River watershed in Pocahontas County. From the confluence the Glady Fork flows north-northeastwardly in a meandering course between Middle Mountain and Shavers Mountain in the Monongahela National Forest, through eastern Randolph County into southern Tucker County, where it joins the Dry Fork at the community of Gladwin.

According to the West Virginia Department of Environmental Protection, nearly 94% of the Glady Fork's watershed is forested, mostly deciduous. The lower half of the river's course is characterized by continuous Class 2 rapids, with Class 3 whitewater in the lowermost three-to-four miles (5–6 km).

== See also ==
- List of West Virginia rivers
