= Backbone Mountain =

Ridge of the Allegheny Mountains in the U.S.

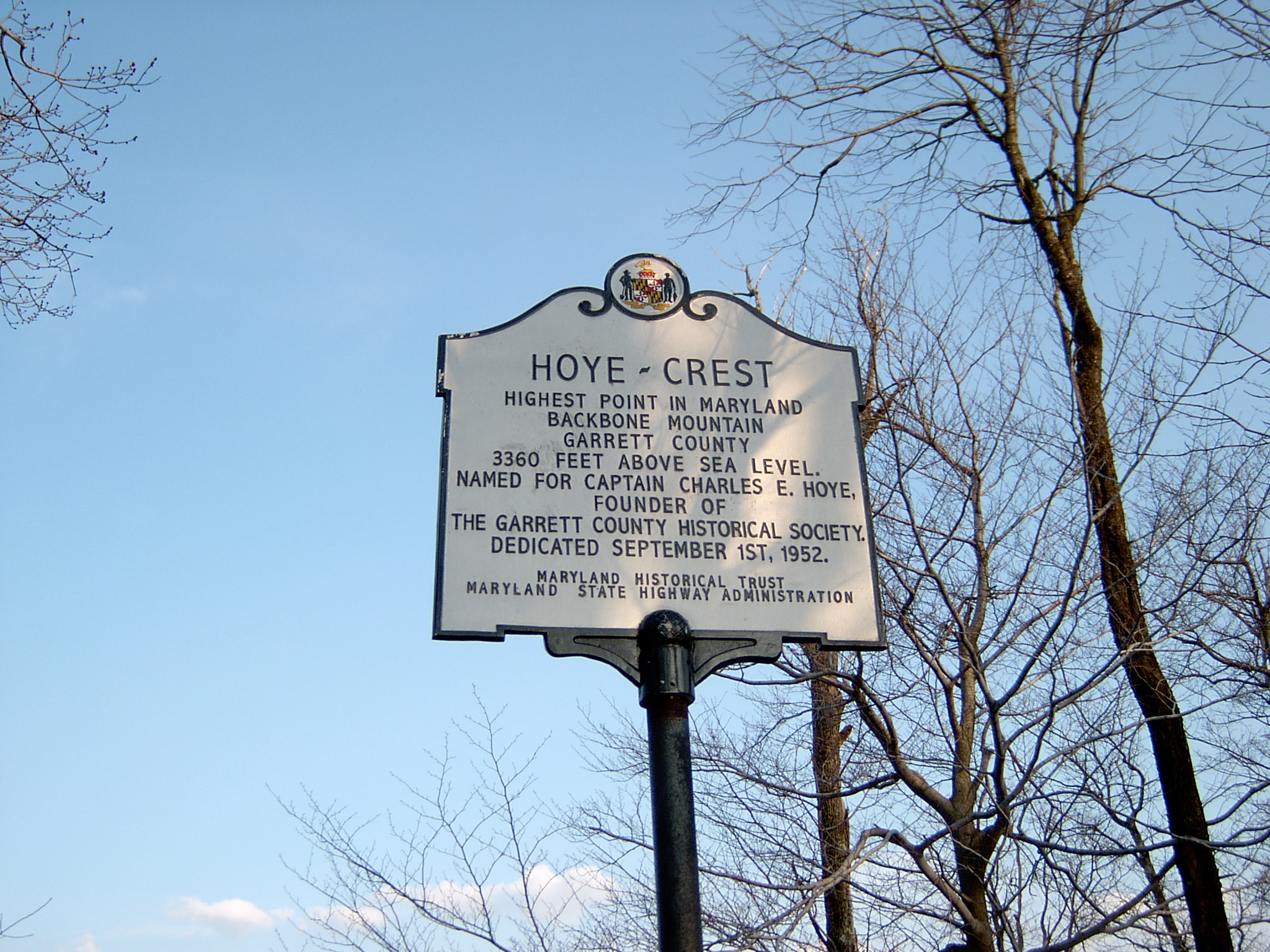
- Marker at Hoye Crest, the high point of Maryland

Highest point
- Peak: 3.92 mi (6.31 km) west of Thomas, West Virginia, Tucker County, West Virginia
- Elevation: 3,662 ft (1,116 m)
- Coordinates: 39°08′50″N 79°34′12″W

Dimensions
- Length: 39 mi (63 km)

Geography
- Location within West Virginia
- Country: United States
- States: Maryland; West Virginia
- Counties: Tucker WV; Preston WV; Garrett MD
- Parent range: Allegheny Mountains

Backbone Mountain is a ridge of the Allegheny Mountains of the central Appalachian Mountain Range. It is situated in the U.S. states of West Virginia and Maryland and forms a portion of the Eastern Continental Divide. Within the state of Maryland, Backbone Mountain reaches an elevation of 3,360 feet or 1,024 meters, making it Maryland's highest point.

== Description and geography ==
Backbone Mountain stretches approximately 39 miles (63 km) southwest to northeast, from the Black Fork near Hambleton in Tucker County, West Virginia to the Savage River Reservoir in Garrett County, Maryland.

The Eastern Continental Divide follows part of the mountain in Maryland. The headwaters of Youghiogheny River, in the watershed of the Mississippi River, lie just northwest of the mountain, whereas the headwaters of the North Branch of the Potomac River lie just south of the mountain, along the West Virginia-Maryland border. In West Virginia, the Eastern Continental Divide diverts to the east, with both sides of the mountain draining into the Black Fork.

The ridge is crossed twice by U.S. Route 219, once north of Parsons and again near Silver Lake. It is also crossed by U.S. Route 50 east of Red House, Maryland, which is marked by a Maryland State Highway Administration sign.

== Notable features ==
=== Hoye-Crest ===
Located just inside of Maryland along Backbone Mountain is Hoye-Crest. At an elevation of 3,360 feet (1,020 m), it is the highest point in the state of Maryland. The location, named for Captain Charles Hoye, founder of the Garrett County Historical Society, has a marker and offers a view of the North Branch Potomac River valley to the east. The location is accessible via a path leading from U.S. Route 219 to the west.

=== Olson Observation Tower ===
The southern end of Backbone Mountain was the location of West Virginia's first fire tower. The first tower was built in 1922 by the state and subsequently transferred to Monongahela National Forest. In 1963, the original tower was replaced with the one currently on-site and named after Ernest B. Olson in recognition of 28 years of service in MNF fire control and conservation programs.

While the cab of the tower is not open to the public, the 133 steps leading to it are. From the tower it is possible to view the surrounding area, including Cheat River watershed, Parsons, Blackwater Canyon, Canaan Mountain and the Otter Creek Wilderness.

=== Crabtree Woods ===
Crabtree Woods, on the northwest slopes of Backbone Mountain, is in the Potomac-Garrett State Forest. It constitutes Maryland's largest surviving remnant of old-growth forest: over 500 acres (2.0 km^{2}) of mixed Appalachian hardwoods (sugar maple, red oak, basswood and cucumber tree).

== See also ==
- Outline of Maryland
- Index of Maryland-related articles
- Blackwater Canyon
- List of U.S. states by elevation
- Monongahela National Forest
