= West Virginia Maneuver Area =

U.S. Army training ground in West Virginia

Coordinates: 38°55′N 79°45′W

The West Virginia Maneuver Area (WVMA) was a vast, five-county training ground in the Allegheny Mountains of eastern West Virginia used by the U.S. Army during World War II to train soldiers in low-altitude mountain operations. This area was selected due to its similarity to the mountainous terrain of Italy and other areas within the European Theater of Operations.

== History of the WVMA ==
Army maneuvers commenced within the WVMA in August 1943 under the command of the 13th Army Corps. The local command was headquartered at Elkins and included a signal battalion, quartermaster detachment, military police unit, a special services company, engineers, ordnance and other support elements.

Training activities were confined to Randolph and four adjacent counties including mostly land of the Monongahela National Forest, but also some private land. Tent cities were erected in Elkins and other local communities to house large numbers of troops; the number swelled to 16,000 by early 1944 as classes cycled though 8-week rotations.

Artillery training utilized a 60,000-acre (240 km^{2}) area in the eastern portion of the WVMA, including parts of Dolly Sods (e.g., Blackbird Knob) and Canaan Valley, for practice firing with 105 mm and 155 mm howitzers. Notices in the local newspaper warned local hunters and others to avoid this area during maneuvers. Improvised river crossings were conducted at the Blackwater and Dry Fork Rivers, among others.

Both Seneca Rocks and the Blackwater Canyon were utilized for mountain climbing instruction. In July 1943 a detachment from Camp Hale, Colorado, instituted high-angle rock and assault climbing instruction at Seneca Rocks. Approximately 180 soldiers cycled through this course every 2 weeks. Instruction ranged from simple rock scrambling to tension cable work with pitons, including rigging skills and use of assault ropes with pulleys. Each class concluded with two tactical night climbs on unfamiliar rocks.

Pack mule techniques were taught at a mule school set up near Gladwin.

Between July 1943 and July 1944 when training ended, more than 100,000 soldiers were trained in the WVMA, among them the 94th Signal Battalion which fought in the Battle of the Bulge.

== Ordnance in the WVMA today ==
For such a large operation, the maneuvers in the WVMA left relatively few permanent changes. Indeed, many of the areas, such as Dolly Sods, are now protected areas that pass as modern "wildernesses", untouched by the hand of man. Nevertheless, old ordnance (artillery and mortar shells) is still occasionally found in these areas. A WVMA project was authorized under the Defense Environmental Restoration Program (DERP) that was established by section 211 of the Superfund Amendments and Reauthorization Act of 1986 and is codified in Sections 2701-2707 of Title 10 of the United States Code. DERP addresses the removal and remedial clean-up activities at active sites under the Installation Restoration Program (IRP) and at Formerly Used Defense Sites (FUDS). In 1997, a highly trained ordnance disposal crew surveyed the trail locations and known campsites at Dolly Sods for shells. Fifteen were found, some of them still live. All were exploded on site. Many more may still exist.
