= Blackwater Falls State Park =

State park in Tucker County, West Virginia

- IUCN category III (natural monument or feature)
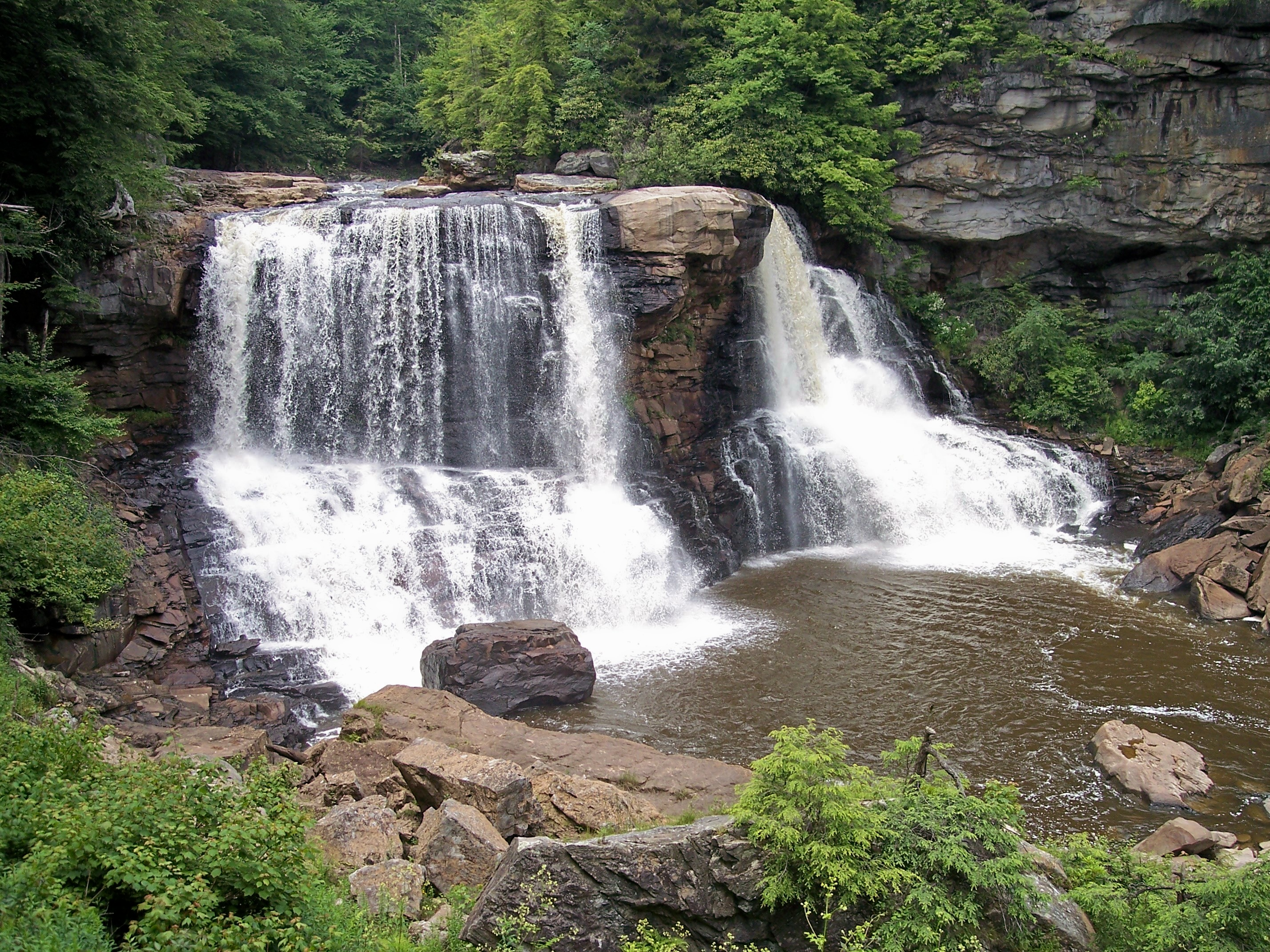
- Blackwater Falls

- Location within West Virginia
- Location: Tucker County, West Virginia, United States
- Coordinates: 39°06′32″N 79°29′46″W
- Area: 2,358 acres (9.54 km^{2})
- Elevation: 2,897 ft (883 m)
- Established: 1937
- Named for: Blackwater Falls on the Blackwater River
- Governing body: West Virginia Division of Natural Resources
- Website: wvstateparks.com/park/blackwater-falls-state-park/

Blackwater Falls State Park is located in the Allegheny Mountains of Tucker County, West Virginia, US. The centerpiece of the park is Blackwater Falls, a 62-foot (19 m) cascade where the Blackwater River leaves its leisurely course in Canaan Valley and enters rugged Blackwater Canyon. It is among the most photographed venues in the state and appears on calendars, stationery, and advertisements. The river is named for its tannin-darkened water.

== Geography ==
Blackwater Falls State Park is located about two miles (3 km) southwest of Davis. It protects 2,358 acres (954 ha) of red spruce and eastern hemlock upland forest. (Other important tree species in the park include yellow birch, American beech, red maple and black cherry.)

=== The Falls ===
The "Great Falls" of Blackwater River 39.1135°N 79.483°W drop about 62 feet (19 m) at the head of Blackwater Canyon. The major ledge is composed of Connoquenessing sandstone of the Middle Pottsville Formation. The Falls are usually cited as the highest above-ground falls (there are higher cave falls) in the state. (Note: The height of the Falls is between 57 feet (17 m) and 63 feet (19 m), depending on how it is measured.) A rocky prominence near the center of the Falls divides its waters into a distinctive formation, rendering its images instantly recognizable. In winter, the Falls often ice over completely. A broad trail descends about 320 feet (98 m) from the Falls parking lot to a wooden walkway and overlook, while a much steeper trail extends beyond the basin below the Falls. On the opposite (east) side of the river, a longer trail ("Gentle Trail") also accesses the Falls from a higher vantage point.

=== Other park trails and falls ===
A nature trail near the park lodge leads to the more distant Lindy Point overlook, affording an excellent view south into the Canyon. There are several other smaller falls within the park. These chutes, cascades, and overhanging ledges on Falls Run (multi-ledge drop, 30 feet), Shay Run (Elakala Falls; 40 feet), and Pendleton Run (Pendleton Falls; 20 feet (6.1 m) plus cascades above and below) are accessible by trail.

== History ==
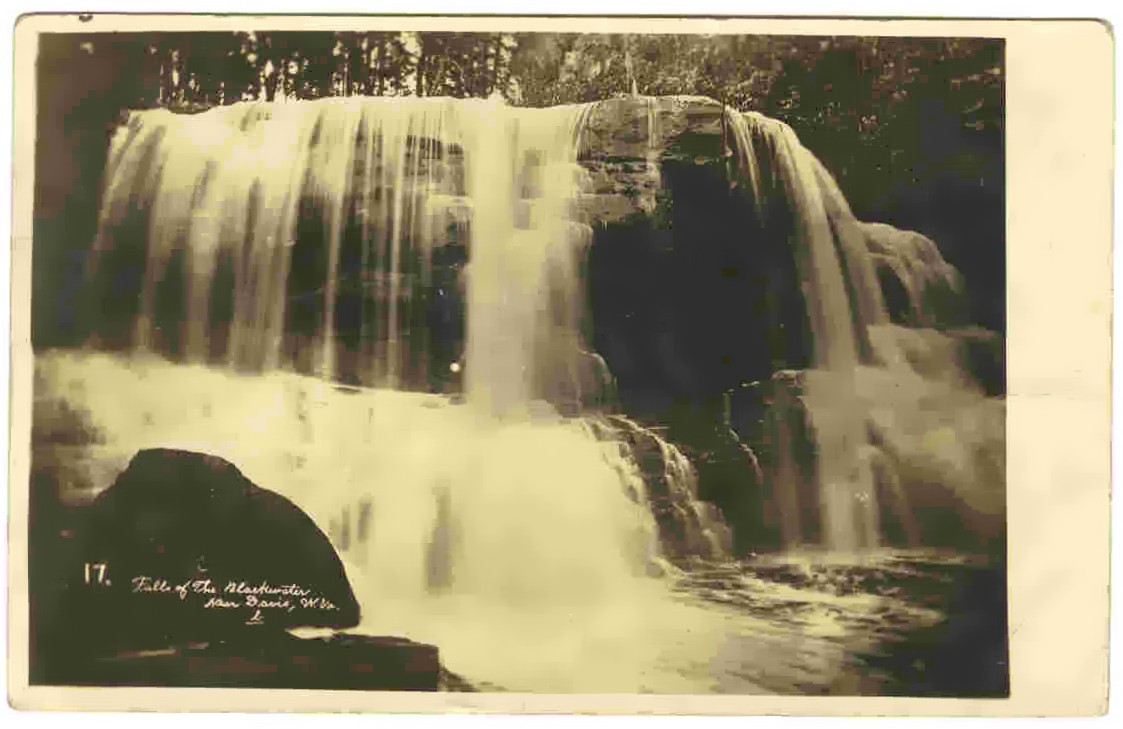
Blackwater Falls, circa 1910

Video of Blackwater Falls on a high-flow day in 2021

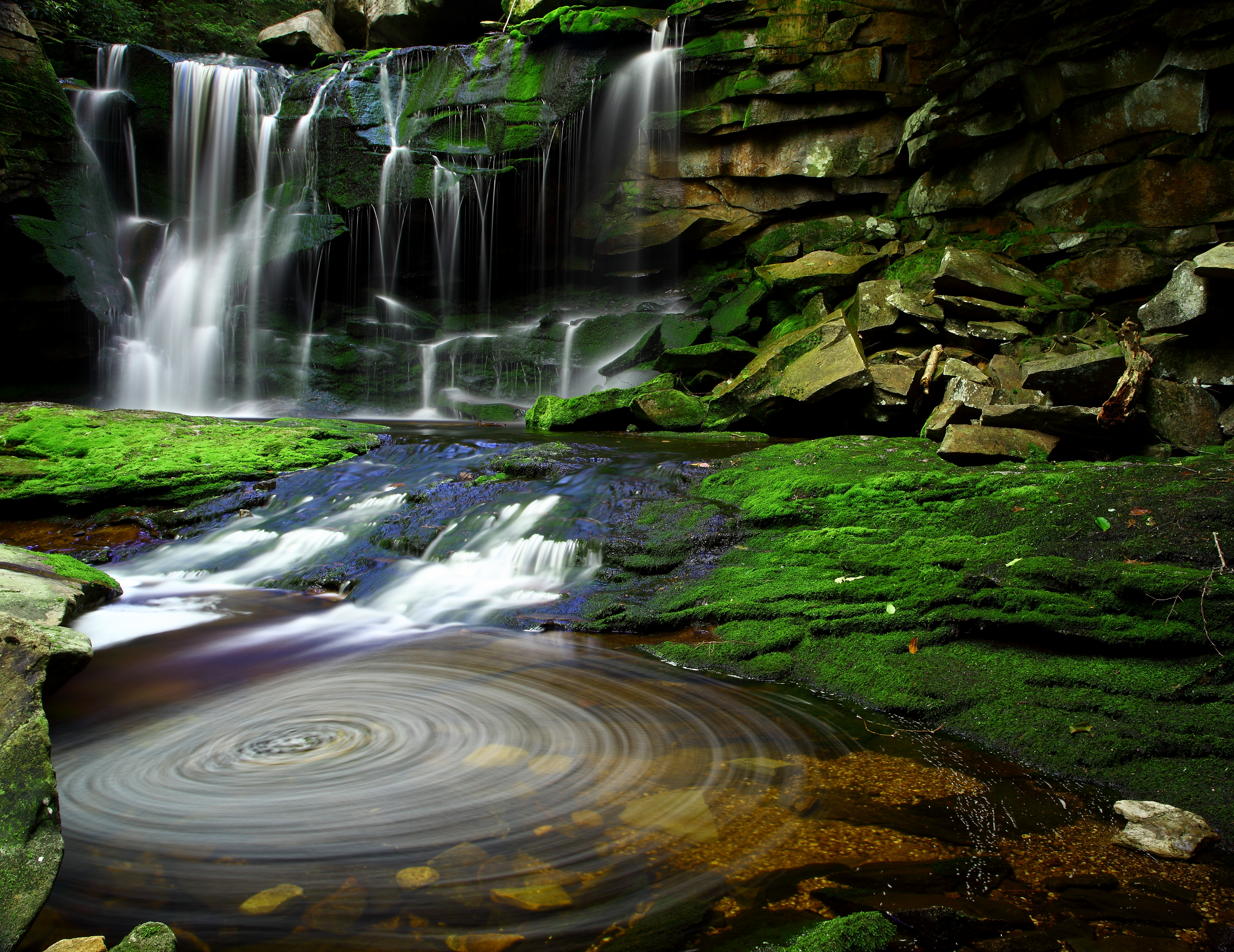
Elakala Falls at BFSP, shot using long exposure photography

The name of the first white explorer to observe Blackwater Falls is not known. There was an oral tradition that it was the early hunter/explorer of the Potomac and Youghiogheny River watersheds Meshach Browning (1781–1859), but while this is plausible there is no documentary evidence for it.

Travel writer Philip Pendleton Kennedy described the Blackwater Canyon for a popular readership in 1853 but somehow managed to miss the Falls. The same year however, his companion and cousin, the illustrator David Hunter Strother ("Porte Crayon"), published "The Virginia Canaan" about his adventures in the Blackwater Country and the Falls entered the literature for the first time. (Note: It is probable that Strother was the discoverer of nearby Douglas Falls (at the head of the side canyon containing the North Fork Blackwater River), mistaking it for a time for the "Great Falls" itself. He later realized and corrected his mistake.) Strother also published a more lengthy description of his June 1852 visit in an article called "The Mountains". The Dobbin House was built near the Falls in 1858 and provided a popular lodge for visitors to the Falls during the 1860s and '70s. A published account of a May 1879 visit to the Falls by recreationalists further popularized the site.

At least four deaths have occurred at the falls. In 1933, a local was accidentally washed over the Falls during a flood. Rudolph Kendzior of Monongah, West Virginia, died cliff diving in 1937. In 1973, a couple was swept over the falls when a woman lost her footing on a slippery rock and her husband lost his balance while trying to catch her.

Beginning in the early 1930s, various leases and donations to the state from the West Virginia Power and Transmission Company (WVPTC), later called Allegheny Power Systems, which then owned much of Blackwater Canyon, protected and facilitated tourism at the Falls. The first of these (1934) resulted in the establishment and maintenance, by the West Virginia State Forest and Park Commission, of a 446 acres (1.80 km^{2}) scenic overlook at the head of the Canyon which included the celebrated Falls itself. A state park was formally established in 1937. Additional donations of land in 1953 and 1955 by the WVPTC, 489 acres (2.0 km^{2}), and by the U.S. Forest Service, 744 acres (3.0 km^{2}), in 1957, brought the total to some 1,679 acres (6.79 km^{2}).

The Park was day-use only until the mid-1950s. The years 1955 and '56, however, saw several improvements to buildings and grounds including the construction of 25 cabins, a dammed fishing/skating lake, and a 55-room lodge dubbed "The Lodge in the Sky" (since the park is the highest in the state) which was opened and dedicated in 1957. Annual visitors numbered 240,000 (over 18,000 of them overnighters) by 1960.

In May 2000, West Virginia Governor Cecil Underwood purchased 25 acres (100,000 m^{2}) of Blackwater Canyon for $50,000 an acre and added it to Blackwater Falls State Park. Allegheny Wood Products, the timber company that owns about half of the Blackwater Canyon today, donated an additional 100 acres (0.40 km^{2}). In January 2002, Governor Bob Wise bought an additional 500 acres (2.0 km^{2}) along the river upstream of the falls from Allegheny Power and added them to the park.

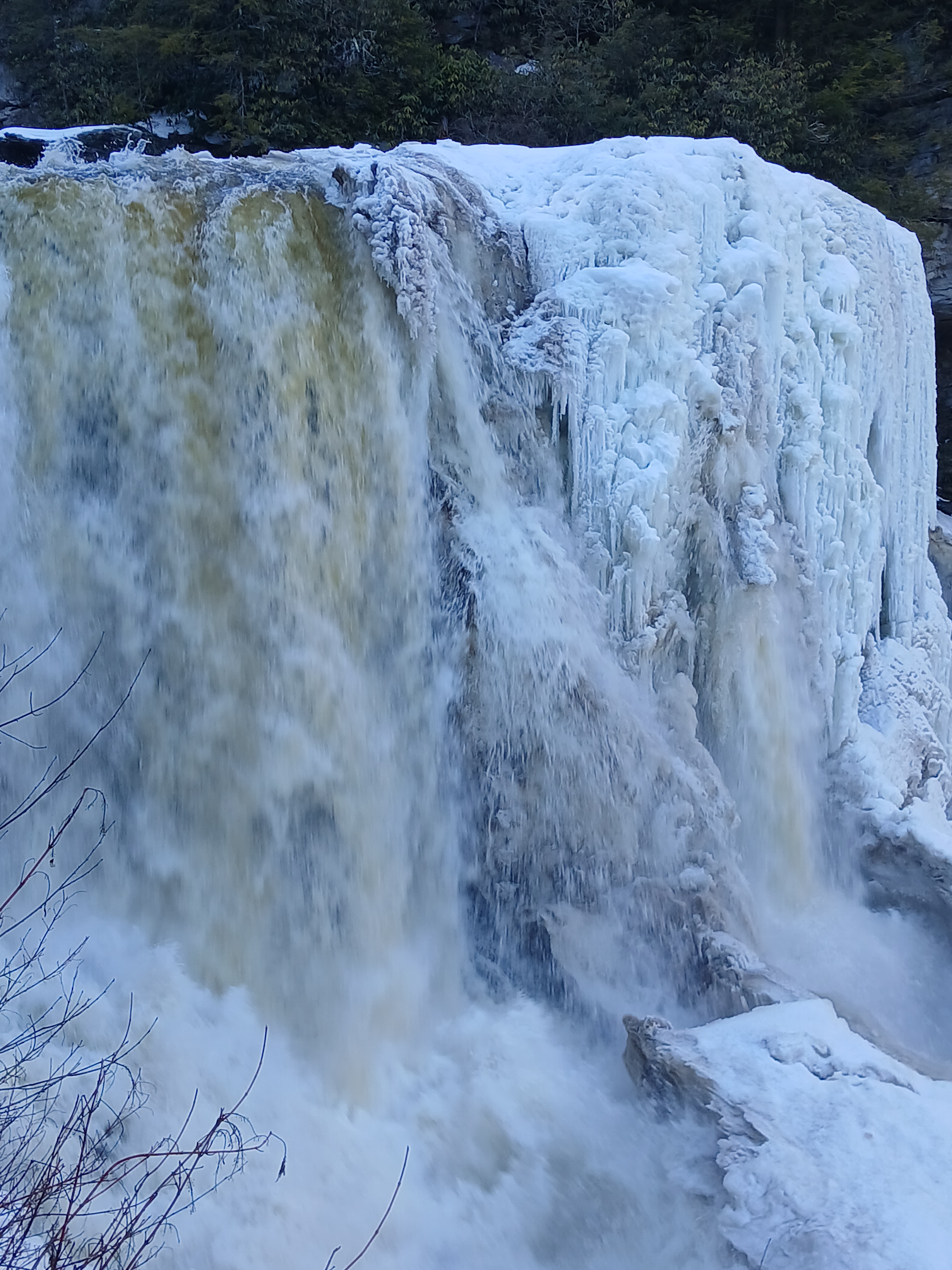
Half-frozen Blackwater Falls

== Amenities and recreation ==
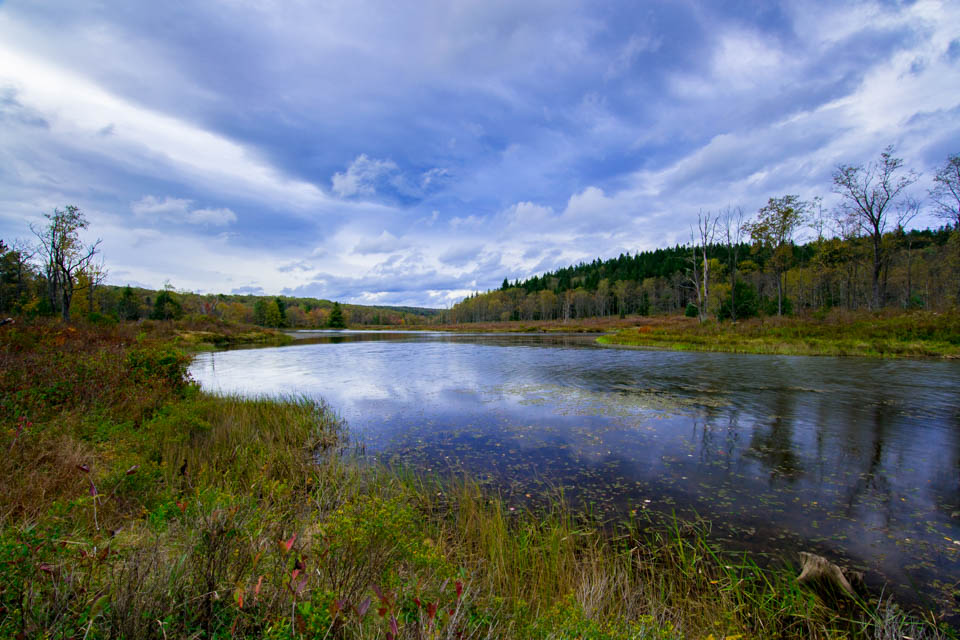
Pendleton Lake at BFSP

- Park lodge with 51 guest rooms
- 39 cabins (13 modernized)
- Campground with 65 campsites (30 have an electrical hookup)
- Restaurant
- Nature center - open from Memorial Day through Labor Day, exhibits about the park's natural history
- Mountain biking
- Cross-country skiing
- Cross-country ski rentals in the winter
- Hiking
- Fishing in Pendleton Lake and the Blackwater River

=== Accessibility ===
Accessibility for the disabled was assessed by West Virginia University. While the park lodge is generally accessible, the 2005 assessment indicated some issues with telephone volume control, the height of door knobs, and the excessive slope of certain ramps.

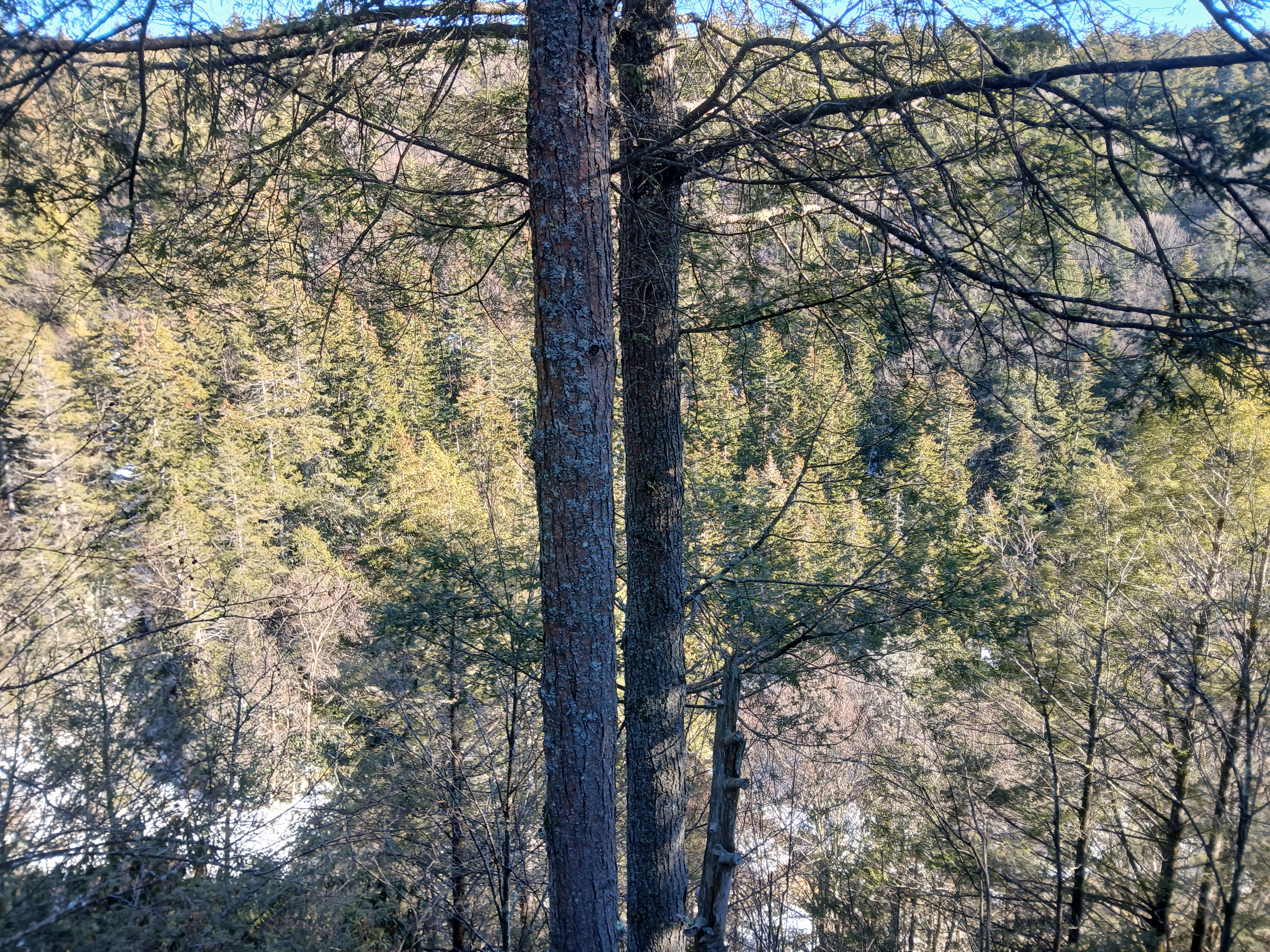
Hemlocks and Red Spruce in Blackwater Canyon

== See also ==
- List of waterfalls
- List of West Virginia state parks
- List of waterfalls in West Virginia
