= Dry Fork, West Virginia =

Unincorporated community in West Virginia, United States

- Unincorporated community
- Location within West Virginia Location within the United States
- Coordinates: 38°58′07″N 79°30′10″W
- Country: United States
- State: West Virginia
- County: Randolph and Tucker
- Elevation: 2,205 ft (672 m)

Population (2010)
  - Total: 781
  - Density: 6/sq mi (2.3/km^{2})
- Time zone: UTC-5 (Eastern (EST))
  - Summer (DST): UTC-4 (EDT)
- ZIP code: 26263
- Area codes: 304 & 681
- GNIS feature ID: 1554331

Dry Fork is an unincorporated community in Randolph and Tucker counties, West Virginia, United States. It is located along West Virginia Route 32, 3.5 miles (5.6 km) north-northeast of Harman. Dry Fork has a post office with ZIP code 26263.

The community takes its name from nearby Dry Fork Cheat River. It is near the Dolly Sods Wilderness.

== Demographics ==
=== 2010 census ===
At the 2010 census there were 781 people, 333 households, and 260 families living in the town. The population density was 6 inhabitants per square mile (2.3/km^{2}). The racial makeup of the town was 100% White.

Of the 333 households 34.8% had children under the age of 18 living with them, 65.2% were married couples living together, 6.0% had a female householder with no husband present, 0% had a male householder with no wife present, and 2.4% were non-families. 19.5% of households were one person.

16.9% of residents were under the age of 18; 4.99% were between the ages of 18 and 21; 19.5% were from 22 to 39; 33.5% were from 40 to 64; and 25.1% were 65 or older.
