= Job, West Virginia =

- Unincorporated community
- Location within West Virginia Location within the United States
- Coordinates: 38°51′51″N 79°33′25″W
- Country: United States
- State: West Virginia
- County: Randolph
- Elevation: 2,582 ft (787 m)
- Time zone: UTC-5 (Eastern (EST))
  - Summer (DST): UTC-4 (EDT)
- ZIP code: 26274
- Area codes: 304 & 681
- GNIS feature ID: 1551576

Job is an unincorporated community in Randolph County, West Virginia, United States. It is 4.5 miles (7.2 km) south-southwest of Harman and is situated where Stink Run enters the Dry Fork Cheat River. The earliest settler there was Thomas Summerfield, who came in 1784.
