= Hoye-Crest =

Summit in Maryland, United States

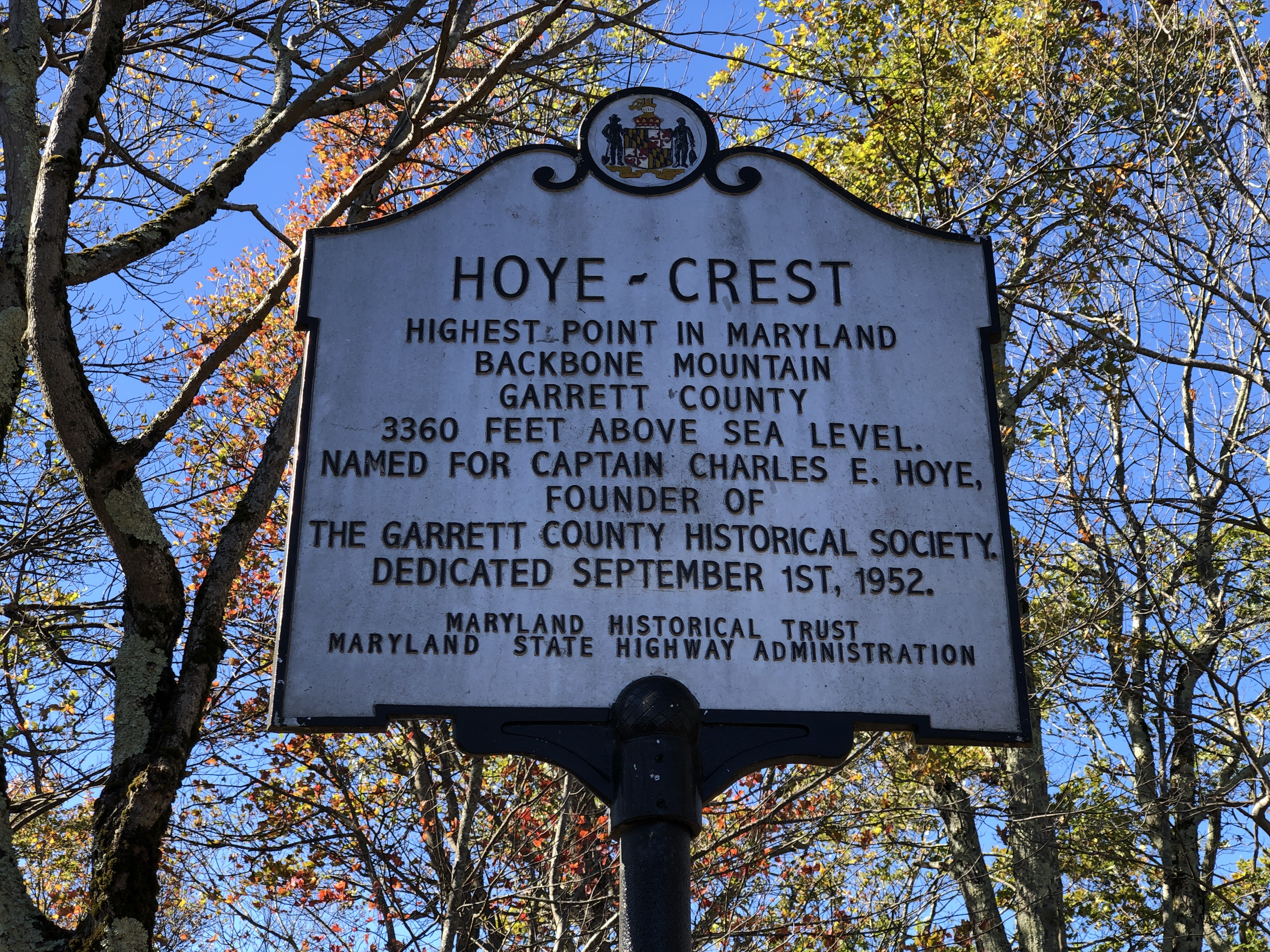
- Marker at Hoye-Crest, the high point of Maryland

Highest point
- Elevation: 3360+ ft (1024+ m) NGVD 29
- Prominence: 80 ft (24 m)
- Parent peak: Backbone Mountain
- Listing: U.S. state high point 32nd
- Coordinates: 39°14′14″N 79°29′07″W

Geography
- Location within Maryland
- Location: Garrett County, Maryland
- Parent range: Allegheny Mountains
- Topo map: USGS Davis

Hoye-Crest is a summit along Backbone Mountain just inside of Garrett County, Maryland. It is the highest natural point in Maryland at an elevation of 3,360 feet (1,020 m).

The location, named for Captain Charles E. Hoye (1876–1951), founder of the Garrett County Historical Society, offers a view of the North Branch Potomac River valley to the east. The Maryland Historical Society placed a historical marker at the summit during a dedication ceremony in September 1952.

== Accessing Hoye-Crest ==
There is no vehicular access to Hoye-Crest. The best route by foot is a hike along the Maryland High Point Trail, from a point along U.S. Route 219 just south of Silver Lake, West Virginia at 39°14′43″N 79°29′30″W. The trail ascends Backbone Mountain along an old logging road on Monongahela National Forest property to the West Virginia-Maryland state line. The distance is about one mile each way. The trail then heads north along the state line to the high point. Hoye-Crest sits on private property (Western Pocahontas Properties), though access is permitted.

== See also ==
- List of U.S. states by elevation
- Backbone Mountain
- Monongahela National Forest
- Meshach Browning
