= Douglas, West Virginia =

Unincorporated community in West Virginia, United States

- Unincorporated community
- Location within the state of West Virginia Douglas (the United States)
- Coordinates: 38°40′20″N 81°3′28″W
- Country: United States
- State: West Virginia
- County: Calhoun
- Elevation: 833 ft (254 m)
- Time zone: UTC-5 (Eastern (EST))
  - Summer (DST): UTC-4 (EDT)
- GNIS ID: 1549659

Douglas is an unincorporated community in Calhoun County, West Virginia, United States.

== See also ==
- Douglas, Tucker County, West Virginia
