= Dry Fork (Cheat River tributary) =

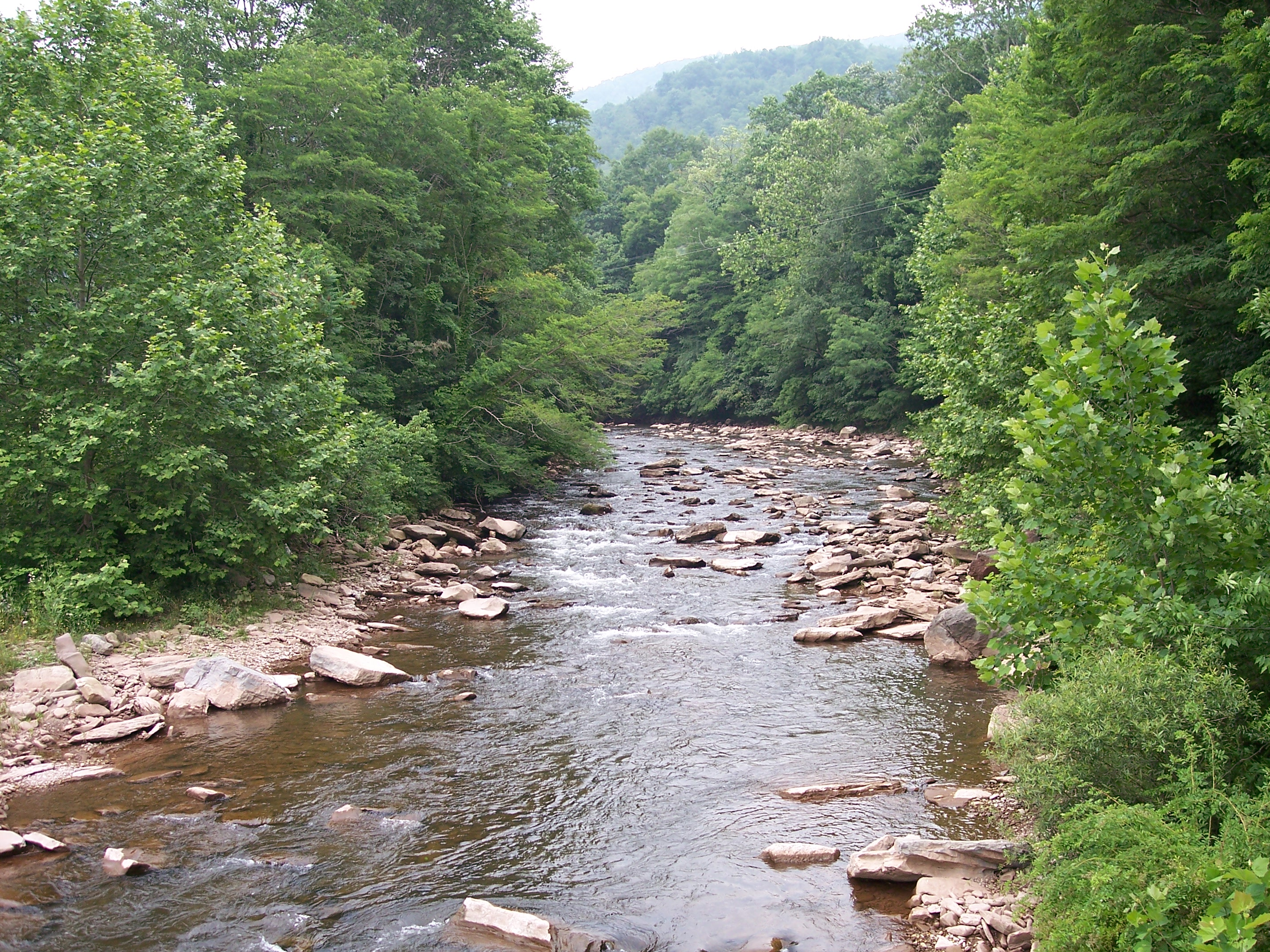
- The Dry Fork near Harman

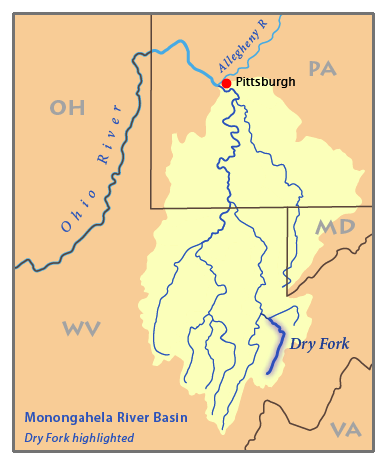
- Map of the Monongahela River basin, with Dry Fork highlighted.

Location
- Country: United States
- State: West Virginia
- Counties: Tucker, Randolph
- Cities: Hendricks, Harman

Physical characteristics
- Source
  - location: Col between Harper and Yokum knobs, Randolph County
  - coordinates: 38°44′01″N 79°38′52″W
  - elevation: 3,740 ft (1,140 m)
- Mouth: Confluence with Blackwater River
  - location: Hendricks, Tucker County
  - coordinates: 39°04′20″N 79°37′45″W
  - elevation: 1,700 ft (520 m)
- Discharge
  - location: Hendricks(2005)
  - average: 756 cu ft/s (21.4 m^{3}/s)(2005)

Basin features
- Tributaries
  - left: Glady Fork, Laurel Fork, Otter Creek
  - right: Red Creek

The Dry Fork is a 39.1-mile-long (62.9 km) tributary of the Black Fork of the Cheat River in the Allegheny Mountains of eastern West Virginia, USA. Via the Black Fork, the Cheat, and the Monongahela and Ohio rivers, it is part of the watershed of the Mississippi River. The Dry Fork flows for much of its length in the Monongahela National Forest and drains mostly rural and forested areas. It was traditionally considered one of the five Forks of Cheat.

== Name ==
According to the Geographic Names Information System, Dry Fork has also been known historically as Dry Run. The stream's name derives from the occurrence of underground passages through which portions of the stream flow, leaving a dry streambed on the surface at times during the year. (See Sinks of Gandy)

== Geography ==
=== Course ===
The Dry Fork rises between Rich Mountain and Little Middle Mountain in eastern Randolph County and initially flows north-northeastwardly, past the towns of Whitmer, Job, and Harman. After it enters Tucker County (at Dryfork) it turns to the northwest and flows to the town of Hendricks, where it meets the Blackwater River to form the Black Fork.

=== Tributaries ===
Gandy Creek — which passes through the well-known cave known as the "Sinks of Gandy" — joins Dry Fork at the town of Gandy. In the lower part of its course the Dry Fork collects the Laurel Fork, which joins it in Randolph County, and the Glady Fork, which joins it in Tucker County. Both of these are also considered principal tributaries of the Cheat River. Red Creek — which enters Dry Fork at the town of Dryfork — drains much of the Dolly Sods Wilderness area.

== See also ==
- List of West Virginia rivers
