= Douglas, Tucker County, West Virginia =

Unincorporated community in West Virginia, United States

Douglas
- Unincorporated community
- Location within the state of West Virginia Douglas (the United States)
- Coordinates: 39°7′37″N 79°31′14″W
- Country: United States
- State: West Virginia
- County: Tucker
- Time zone: UTC-5 (Eastern (EST))
  - Summer (DST): UTC-4 (EDT)
- GNIS feature ID: 1554324

Douglas is an unincorporated community and coal town on the North Fork Blackwater River in Tucker County, West Virginia, United States. Originally known as Albert, the community's name was changed to Douglas by an official Board on Geographic Names decision in 1965. Its post office, however, continued to use the name Albert.

== See also ==
- Douglas, Calhoun County, West Virginia
