= Hambleton, West Virginia =

- Town
- Location of Hambleton in Tucker County, West Virginia.
- Coordinates: 39°4′53″N 79°38′45″W
- Country: United States
- State: West Virginia
- County: Tucker
- Established: 1889
- Incorporated: 1905

Area
  - Total: 0.16 sq mi (0.42 km^{2})
  - Land: 0.14 sq mi (0.36 km^{2})
  - Water: 0.023 sq mi (0.06 km^{2})
- Elevation: 1,722 ft (525 m)

Population (2020)
  - Total: 218
  - Estimate (2021): 212
  - Density: 1,554.7/sq mi (600.28/km^{2})
- Time zone: UTC-5 (Eastern (EST))
  - Summer (DST): UTC-4 (EDT)
- ZIP code: 26269
- Area code: 304
- FIPS code: 54-34492
- GNIS feature ID: 1551333

Hambleton is a town in Tucker County, West Virginia, United States. The population was 216 at the 2020 census.

== History ==
Hambleton was established in 1889, but not incorporated until 1905. It was named by then United States Senator Stephen B. Elkins in honor of a stockholder by this name in the West Virginia Central Railroad Company. The town was previously known as Hulings.

== Geography ==
Hambleton is located at 39°4′53″N 79°38′45″W (39.081439, -79.645851), along the Black Fork River.

According to the United States Census Bureau, the town has a total area of 0.16 square miles (0.41 km^{2}), of which 0.12 square miles (0.31 km^{2}) is land and 0.04 square miles (0.10 km^{2}) is water.

=== Climate ===
The climate in this area has mild differences between highs and lows, and there is adequate rainfall year-round. According to the Köppen Climate Classification system, Hambleton has a marine west coast climate, abbreviated "Cfb" on climate maps.

== Demographics ==
Historical population
Census	Pop.	Note	%±
1910	1,300		—
1920	488		−62.5%
1930	368		−24.6%
1940	394		7.1%
1950	283		−28.2%
1960	275		−2.8%
1970	328		19.3%
1980	403		22.9%
1990	265		−34.2%
2000	246		−7.2%
2010	232		−5.7%
2020	218		−6.0%
2021 (est.)	212	▼	−2.8%
U.S. Decennial Census

=== 2010 census ===
As of the census of 2010, there were 232 people, 97 households, and 68 families living in the town. The population density was 1,933.3 inhabitants per square mile (746.5/km^{2}). There were 128 housing units at an average density of 1,066.7 per square mile (411.9/km^{2}). The racial makeup of the town was 99.1% White and 0.9% from two or more races. Hispanic or Latino of any race were 1.7% of the population.

There were 97 households, of which 29.9% had children under the age of 18 living with them, 45.4% were married couples living together, 15.5% had a female householder with no husband present, 9.3% had a male householder with no wife present, and 29.9% were non-families. 24.7% of all households were made up of individuals, and 12.4% had someone living alone who was 65 years of age or older. The average household size was 2.39 and the average family size was 2.84.

The median age in the town was 42 years. 21.1% of residents were under the age of 18; 11.7% were between the ages of 18 and 24; 21.1% were from 25 to 44; 30.2% were from 45 to 64; and 15.9% were 65 years of age or older. The gender makeup of the town was 47.0% male and 53.0% female.

=== 2000 census ===
As of the census of 2000, there were 246 people, 102 households, and 68 families living in the town. The population density was 1,858.7 inhabitants per square mile (730.6/km^{2}). There were 113 housing units at an average density of 853.8 per square mile (335.6/km^{2}). The racial makeup of the town was 99.19% White, 0.41% Asian and 0.41% Pacific Islander.

There were 102 households, out of which 30.4% had children under the age of 18 living with them, 54.9% were married couples living together, 7.8% had a female householder with no husband present, and 32.4% were non-families. 30.4% of all households were made up of individuals, and 16.7% had someone living alone who was 65 years of age or older. The average household size was 2.41 and the average family size was 2.97.

In the town, the population was spread out, with 22.8% under the age of 18, 9.3% from 18 to 24, 28.5% from 25 to 44, 22.8% from 45 to 64, and 16.7% who were 65 years of age or older. The median age was 38 years. For every 100 females, there were 87.8 males. For every 100 females age 18 and over, there were 81.0 males.

The median income for a household in the town was $23,625, and the median income for a family was $31,250. Males had a median income of $24,688 versus $14,500 for females. The per capita income for the town was $12,835. About 10.4% of families and 16.5% of the population were below the poverty line, including 10.7% of those under the age of eighteen and 12.8% of those 65 or over.
