= Meshach Browning =

American pioneer, hunter and explorer (1781-1859)

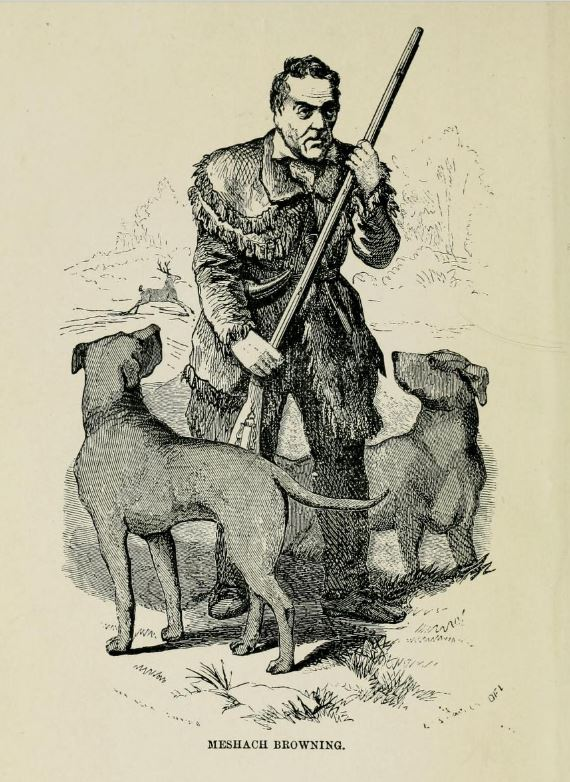
- Meshach Browning illustration from his 1859 autobiography, Forty-Four Years of the Life of a Hunter; Being Reminiscences of Meshach Browning, a Maryland Hunter; Roughly Written Down by Himself.
- Born: c. 1781; Damascus, Maryland, U.S.
- Died: November 19, 1859 (aged 77–78); Johnstown, Somerset County, Pennsylvania, Pennsylvania, U.S.
- Resting place: St. Dominic's Catholic Cemetery, Hoyes, Maryland
- Other names: Sam Mason; Mason; Samuel Meason; Meason; Captain Mason; Ensign Mason; Squire Mason; Mason of the Woods; Wilson; Bully Wilson
- Occupations: frontiersman; hunter; soldier; state militia officer; author
- Employer(s): Maryland state government, self-employed
- Spouses: Mary McMullen (m. 1799; died 1839); Mary M. Smith (m. 1841)
- Military career
- Allegiance: United States
- Branch: Maryland Militia
- Service years: 1812–1814?
- Rank: sergeant
- Unit: Allegany County Militia
- Conflicts: War of 1812

Meshach Browning (c. 1781 – 19 November 1859) was an early backwoodsman, hunter and explorer of the watersheds of the North Branch Potomac and Youghiogheny Rivers. His memoir is Forty-Four Years of the Life of a Hunter (1859). He has been celebrated as Maryland's most famous frontier hunter. Browning's memoir of his "hunting-fever" years (1795–1839) and other activities was originally penned with a turkey quill. Half backwoods history, half heroic adventure story, it recounts his hunting expeditions and life-threatening encounters while stalking game and records details of life in early frontier America, western Maryland folkways and early settlement life.

== Early life ==
Browning was born in Damascus, Montgomery County, Maryland. Browning's father was an English soldier who escaped from Braddock's massacre (1755), deserted and settled in the highlands of Western Maryland. This community was a wholly self-subsistent one in which the men wore deer skins procured by their own rifles and dressed and tailored by themselves. The women spun and wove flax and wool. The only commodities upon which they were dependent on outsiders were gunpowder and lead for shot. Browning married Mary McMullen (1781–1839) on April 13, 1799, at Blooming Rose, Maryland. After his first wife's death, he married Mary M. Smith, on 24 April 1841 in Allegany County, Maryland.

== War of 1812 military service ==
His military experience was restricted to a draft as a sergeant in a company of militia, during the War of 1812, which went into action only once, and that on the occasion of a muster when they undertook to "lick" their commander, with whom they had become disgruntled. The mutineers apparently got the worst of it.

== Hunting career ==
Browning became an expert in woodcraft and wild animal behavior and habitats. His pursuit of the abundant white-tailed deer, black bear, panthers and wolves through the "western wilderness" became legendary. This wilderness was the Allegheny Mountains, especially in Garrett County, Maryland, and the surrounding regions of what is now West Virginia. He was known as a market hunter.

== Later years ==
Browning and his son-in-law, Dominick Mattingly, were selected to collect donations to build a church at Johnstown, Pennsylvania. The result of their labors was St. James Church, dedicated in 1853 under the pastorate of Rev. William Lambert and prosperous for many years.

== Death ==
Browning died of pneumonia on November 19, 1859, in Johnstown, Pennsylvania.

== Legacy ==
In 1859, a book reviewer of Browning's newly published book noted that his family, founded in 1800, had increased “fifty years later to one hundred and twenty-two, of whom sixty-seven, as their progenitor says proudly, were 'capable of bearing arms for the defence of their country,'— though, to be sure, the Harper's Ferry affair leaves us in some doubt as to the direction in which they would bear them.” Browning's account of his fight with an unexpectedly formidable buck in the Youghiogheny River inspired Arthur Fitzwilliam Tait (1819-1905) — the great Adirondack artist and deer hunter — to paint the scene in 1861 (The Life of a Hunter: Catching a Tartar). The same year Currier and Ives published a hand-colored lithograph of Tait's black and white painting, thus immortalizing the incident.

A Maryland Historical Marker states Browning was Garrett County's most famous hunter, killing 2,000 deer and 500 bears during this 40-year period. This marker lies within eyesight of Browning's grave at St. Dominic's Catholic Cemetery in Hoye, Maryland.

In 1890, St. James Church was rebuilt under the pastorate of Rev. Romanus Mattingly. The name was changed from to St. Dominic Church (St. Dominic being the patron saint of Dominick Mattingly, who was a zealous Catholic. His wife, Ann Browning, was Meshach's daughter.) The church was located on the road opposite the Mattingly homestead in what is now Hoye, Maryland, and the cemetery adjoining contains the graves of Browning, D. J. Mattingly, and many of their descendants.

== Works ==
Forty-Four Years of the Life of a Hunter; Being Reminiscences of Meshach Browning, a Maryland Hunter; Roughly Written Down by Himself, Revised and illustrated by E. Stabler. Philadelphia: J. B. Lippincott & Co., 1859. (Many reprints include the twelve hunting scene engravings by Edward Stabler [1794–1883].)
