= Hendricks, West Virginia =

- Town
- Location of Hendricks in Tucker County, West Virginia.
- Coordinates: 39°4′30″N 79°37′53″W
- Country: United States
- State: West Virginia
- County: Tucker
- Incorporated: 1894

Area
  - Total: 0.35 sq mi (0.90 km^{2})
  - Land: 0.34 sq mi (0.89 km^{2})
  - Water: 0.0039 sq mi (0.01 km^{2})
- Elevation: 1,716 ft (523 m)

Population (2020)
  - Total: 228
  - Estimate (2021): 221
  - Density: 751.9/sq mi (290.32/km^{2})
- Time zone: UTC-5 (Eastern (EST))
  - Summer (DST): UTC-4 (EDT)
- ZIP code: 26271
- Area code: 304
- FIPS code: 54-36460
- GNIS feature ID: 1554682
- Website: https://local.wv.gov/hendricks/Pages/default.aspx

Hendricks is a town in Tucker County, West Virginia, United States. The population was 226 at the 2020 census. The Blackwater River and the Dry Fork join at Hendricks to form the Black Fork, a principal tributary of the Cheat River.

== History ==
In 1803, after three unproductive years in nearby Canaan Valley, German settler Henry Fansler (d. 1843) settled at the mouth of the Blackwater River at the present site of Hendricks. He called the settlement "Eden". Hendricks was incorporated in 1894 and was named by local coal and timber magnate Henry Gassaway Davis for Vice President Thomas A. Hendricks.

== Geography ==
Hendricks is located at 39°4′30″N 79°37′53″W (39.074883, -79.631399).

According to the United States Census Bureau, the town has a total area of 0.34 square miles (0.88 km^{2}), all land.

== Demographics ==
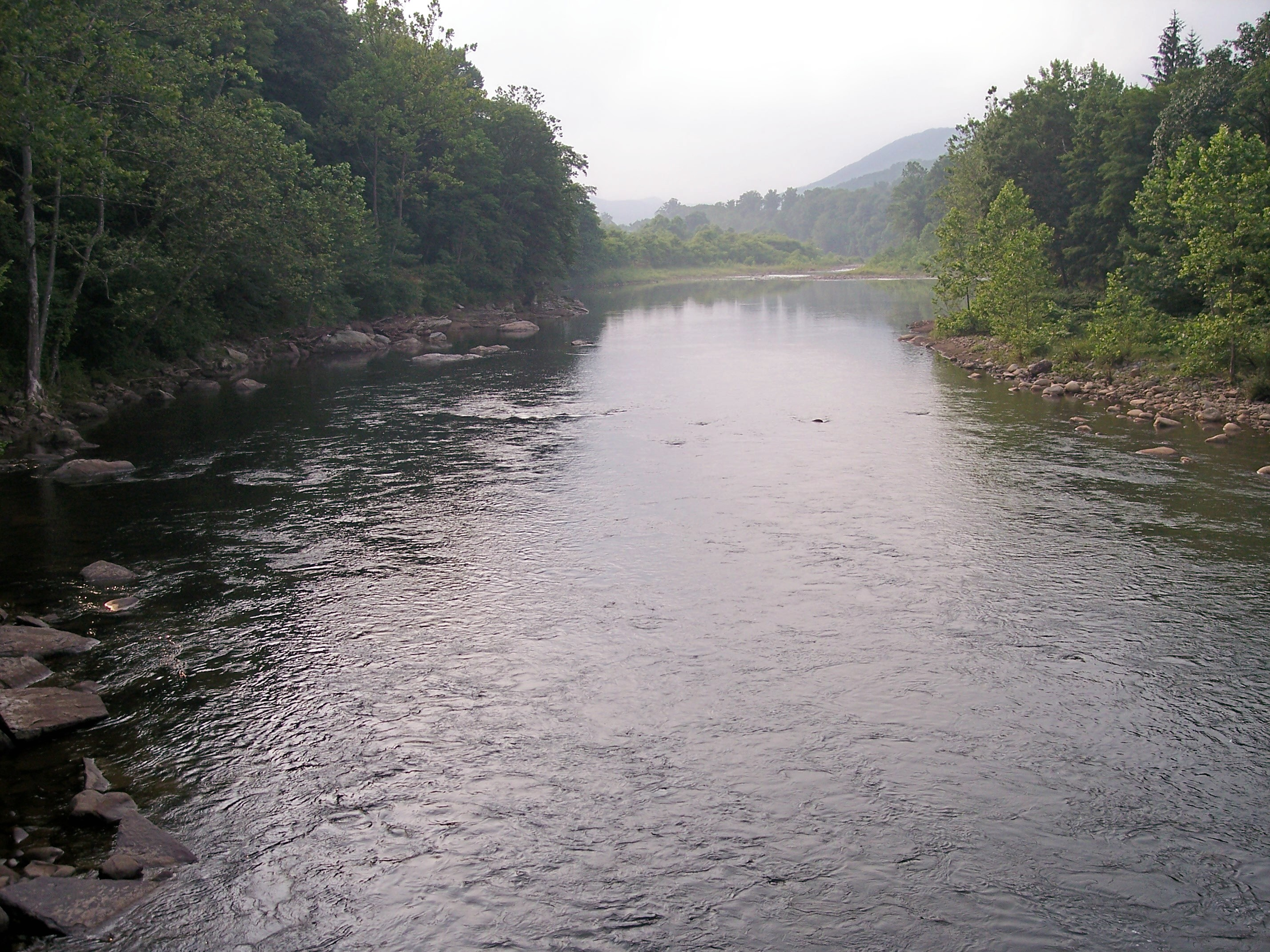
The Black Fork in Hendricks

Historical population
Census	Pop.	Note	%±
1900	317		—
1910	640		101.9%
1920	622		−2.8%
1930	484		−22.2%
1940	539		11.4%
1950	492		−8.7%
1960	407		−17.3%
1970	317		−22.1%
1980	390		23.0%
1990	303		−22.3%
2000	319		5.3%
2010	272		−14.7%
2020	228		−16.2%
2021 (est.)	221	▼	−3.1%
U.S. Decennial Census

=== 2010 census ===
At the 2010 census there were 272 people, 112 households, and 89 families living in the town. The population density was 800.0 inhabitants per square mile (308.9/km^{2}). There were 145 housing units at an average density of 426.5 per square mile (164.7/km^{2}). The racial makeup of the town was 100.0% White. Of the 112 households 29.5% had children under the age of 18 living with them, 68.8% were married couples living together, 4.5% had a female householder with no husband present, 6.3% had a male householder with no wife present, and 20.5% were non-families. 17.9% of households were one person and 11.7% were one person aged 65 or older. The average household size was 2.43 and the average family size was 2.72.

The median age in the town was 44.5 years. 18.4% of residents were under the age of 18; 7.7% were between the ages of 18 and 24; 24.6% were from 25 to 44; 30.9% were from 45 to 64; and 18.4% were 65 or older. The gender makeup of the town was 48.9% male and 51.1% female.

=== 2000 census ===
At the 2000 census there were 319 people, 123 households, and 100 families living in the town. The population density was 925.9 inhabitants per square mile (362.3/km^{2}). There were 138 housing units at an average density of 400.5 per square mile (156.7/km^{2}). The racial makeup of the town was 99.06% White, 0.31% Native American, 0.31% from other races, and 0.31% from two or more races. Hispanic or Latino of any race were 0.31%.

Of the 123 households 34.1% had children under the age of 18 living with them, 71.5% were married couples living together, 7.3% had a female householder with no husband present, and 17.9% were non-families. 17.9% of households were one person and 11.4% were one person aged 65 or older. The average household size was 2.59 and the average family size was 2.85.

The age distribution was 23.8% under the age of 18, 9.7% from 18 to 24, 20.7% from 25 to 44, 29.5% from 45 to 64, and 16.3% 65 or older. The median age was 42 years. For every 100 females, there were 100.6 males. For every 100 females age 18 and over, there were 102.5 males.

The median household income was $26,705 and the median family income was $27,500. Males had a median income of $26,042 versus $17,500 for females. The per capita income for the town was $21,315. About 25.5% of families and 23.3% of the population were below the poverty line, including 33.3% of those under age 18 and 21.3% of those age 65 or over.
