= Blackwater River (West Virginia) =

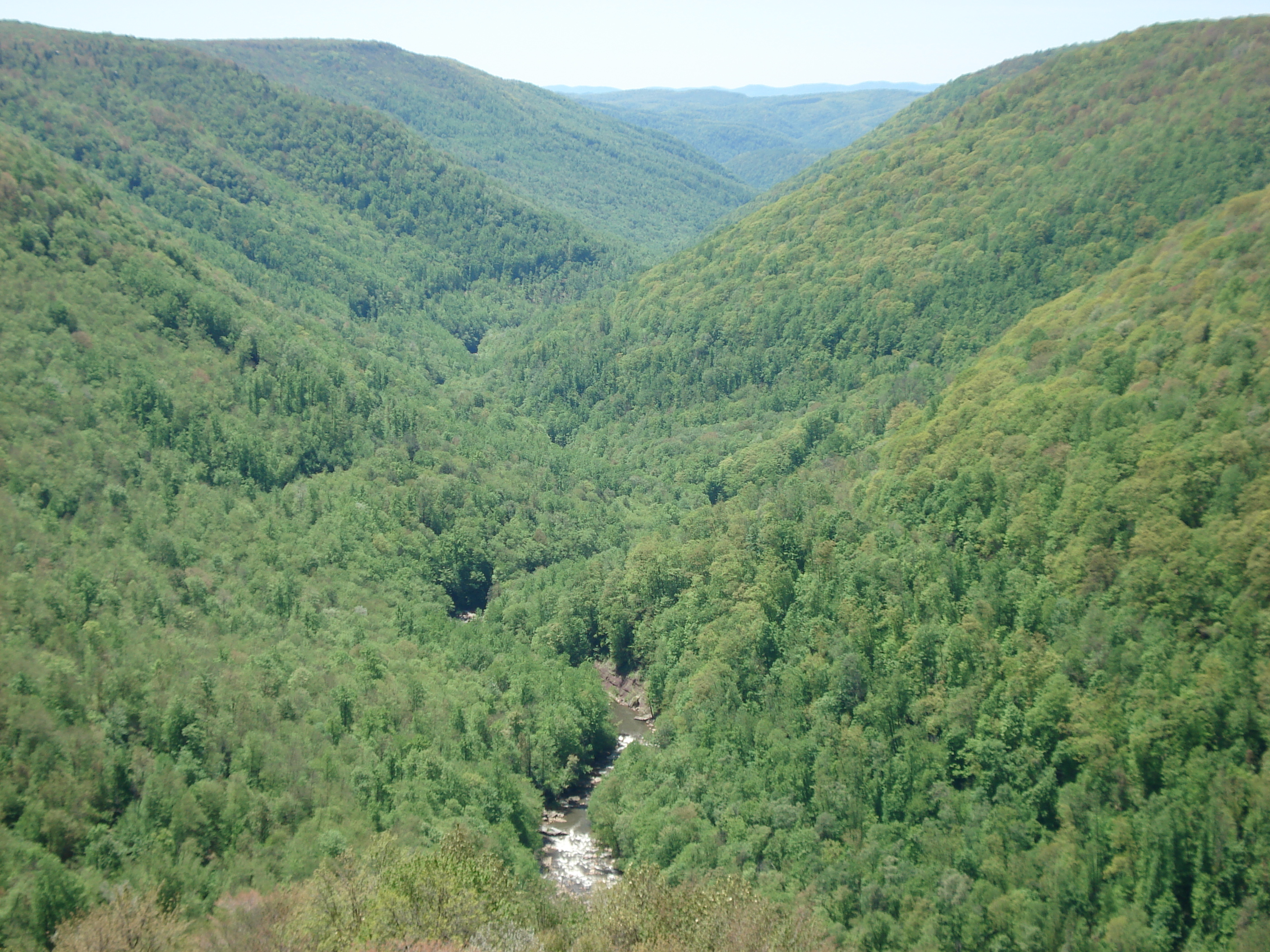
- Blackwater River in Blackwater Canyon viewed from Lindy Point in Blackwater Falls State Park

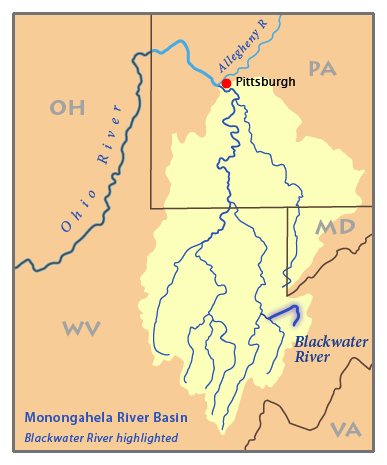
- Map of the Monongahela River basin, with the Blackwater River highlighted.

Location
- Country: United States
- State: West Virginia
- County: Tucker

Physical characteristics
- Source: Canaan Mountain
  - location: Tucker County, WV
  - coordinates: 39°03′39″N 79°29′04″W
  - elevation: 3,594 ft (1,095 m)
- Mouth: Black Fork
  - location: Hendricks, WV
  - coordinates: 39°04′20″N 79°37′45″W
  - elevation: 1,690 ft (520 m)
- Length: 34 mi (55 km)
- Basin size: 142 sq mi (370 km^{2})
- Discharge
  - location: Davis, WV
  - average: 189 cu ft/s (5.4 m^{3}/s)
  - minimum: 22 cu ft/s (0.62 m^{3}/s)(1930)
  - maximum: 12,500 cu ft/s (350 m^{3}/s)(1929)

Basin features
- Tributaries
  - right: North Branch Blackwater River, Little Blackwater River

The Blackwater River is a 34.3-mile-long (55.2 km) river in the Allegheny Mountains of eastern West Virginia, USA. Via the Black Fork, it is a principal tributary of the Cheat River. Via the Cheat, the Monongahela and the Ohio rivers, it is part of the watershed of the Mississippi River and drains an area of 142 square miles (370 km^{2}). It is a true blackwater stream, owing to spruce and hemlock trees in its watershed, the tannins of which impart a tea or amber color to its water.

== Geography ==
The entire course and drainage area of the Blackwater lie within Tucker County. It rises on Canaan Mountain at an elevation of 3,594 feet (1,095 m) and initially meanders north-northeastwardly through the wetlands of Canaan Valley, passing through the Canaan Valley Resort State Park and the Canaan Valley National Wildlife Refuge, and collecting two short tributaries known as the North Branch Blackwater River and the Little Blackwater River. Below the mouth of the latter, the Blackwater turns west-southwestwardly for the remainder of its course.

After passing the town of Davis, it falls 62 feet (19 m) over Blackwater Falls and enters the eight-mile (13 km) long Blackwater Canyon in Blackwater Falls State Park. Here it forms whitewater rapids of Class IV-V+ and collects the eight-mile (13 km) long North Fork Blackwater River, which flows past the town of Thomas.

Finally, the Blackwater joins the Dry Fork to form the Black Fork at the town of Hendricks, at an elevation of 1,690 feet (520 m).

== Water quality ==
=== Blackwater ===
As with other blackwater rivers, the color of West Virginia's Blackwater River results from the leaching of tannins from the decaying leaves of vegetation adjoining the stream in its upper reaches, which are slow moving. Fallen needles from stands of eastern hemlock and red spruce contribute primarily to this, although rhododendron, mountain laurel and the sphagnum bogs of Canaan Valley also contribute. The Blackwater is also typical in having transparent, acidic, and oligotrophic (very low nutrient) water.

=== Acid mine drainage ===
Beginning in the 1880s, the Blackwater River watershed (especially the segment of the North Fork of the Blackwater River between the towns of Thomas and Douglas) suffered extreme environmental degradation due to deep mining and coke production. This was exacerbated by the surface mining activities of the 1960s and '70s, which brought about a severe decline in water quality due to acid mine drainage (AMD).

In recent years, the limestone treatment of AMD in the Blackwater River has met with success with the effort receiving an award from the U.S. Office of Surface Mining. AMD is created when sulfite-bearing mineral strata are exposed to air and rainwater, such as when surface mining occurs. The sulfuric acid produced from the sulfite reaction can dissolve metals such as iron, aluminum, and magnesium. By 2004, the combination of acid and dissolved metals drainage had destroyed or damaged about 12,000 miles (19,000 km) of streams in Appalachia, including the Blackwater River and streams in its watershed.

Restoration of the Blackwater River watershed was a costly and complex task involving two large projects. The Douglas Highwall Abandoned Mine Land Reclamation Project installed 16,000 tons (14,400 tonnes) of limestone in a "Wetland/Anoxic Limestone Drain (WALD) system" on the North Fork Blackwater River downstream of Thomas. Although the experimental WALD system did not perform as intended, and "has not generated measurable alkalinity" it did reduce the total acid and metal load in the water discharge from the abandoned mine into the river system.

More successful was a project just upstream of Davis, on Beaver Creek, a tributary of the Blackwater. A six-drum water-powered limestone grinding station adds limestone slurry to the water flowing down Beaver Creek. A Swedish-designed limestone powder dosing system was also installed as backup to the drum system. The five miles (8.0 km) stretch of the Blackwater between the limestone station and the confluence with the North Fork has now become one of West Virginia's premiere catch and release trout streams.

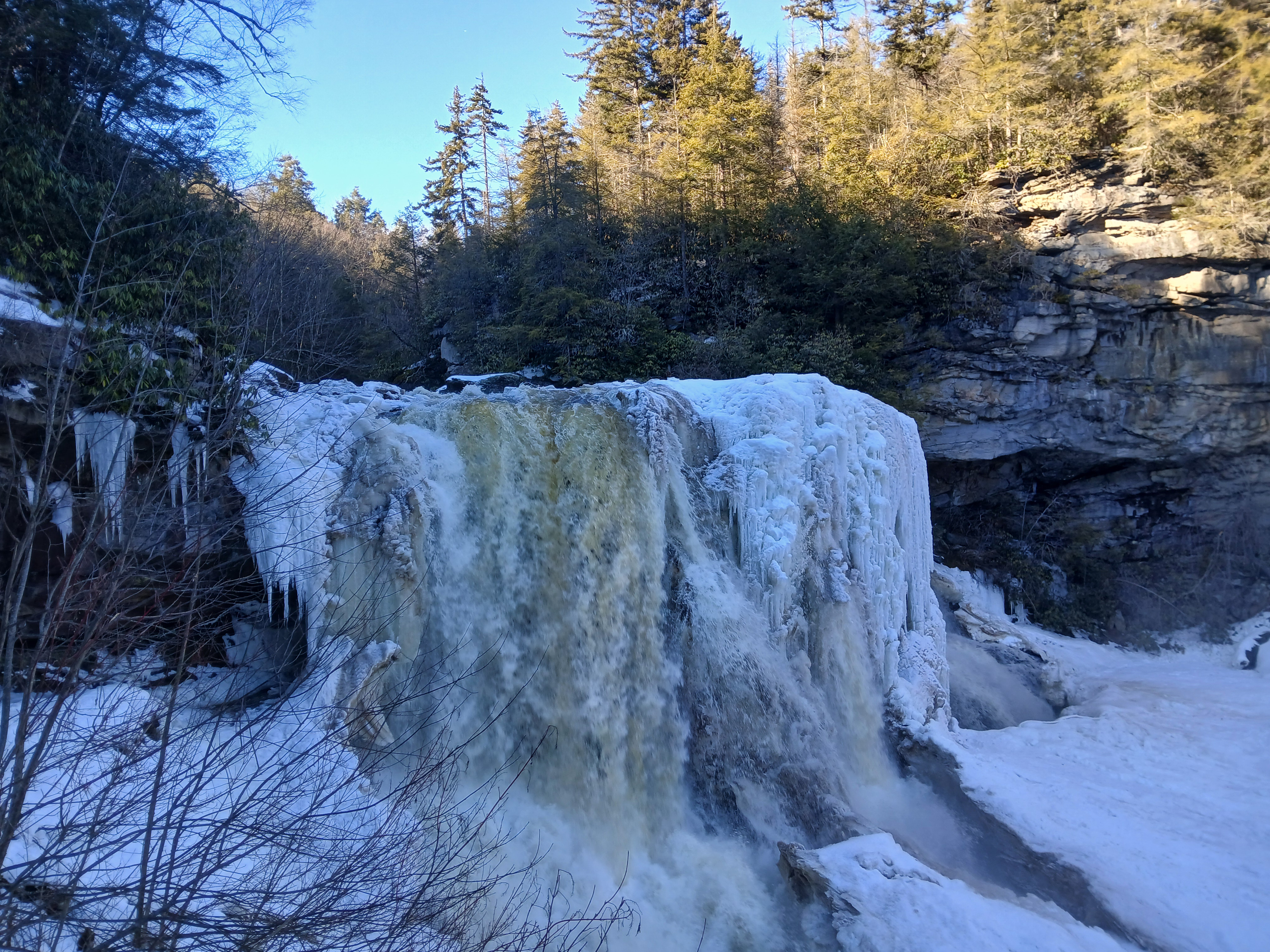
View of Blackwater Falls in February

== Gallery ==
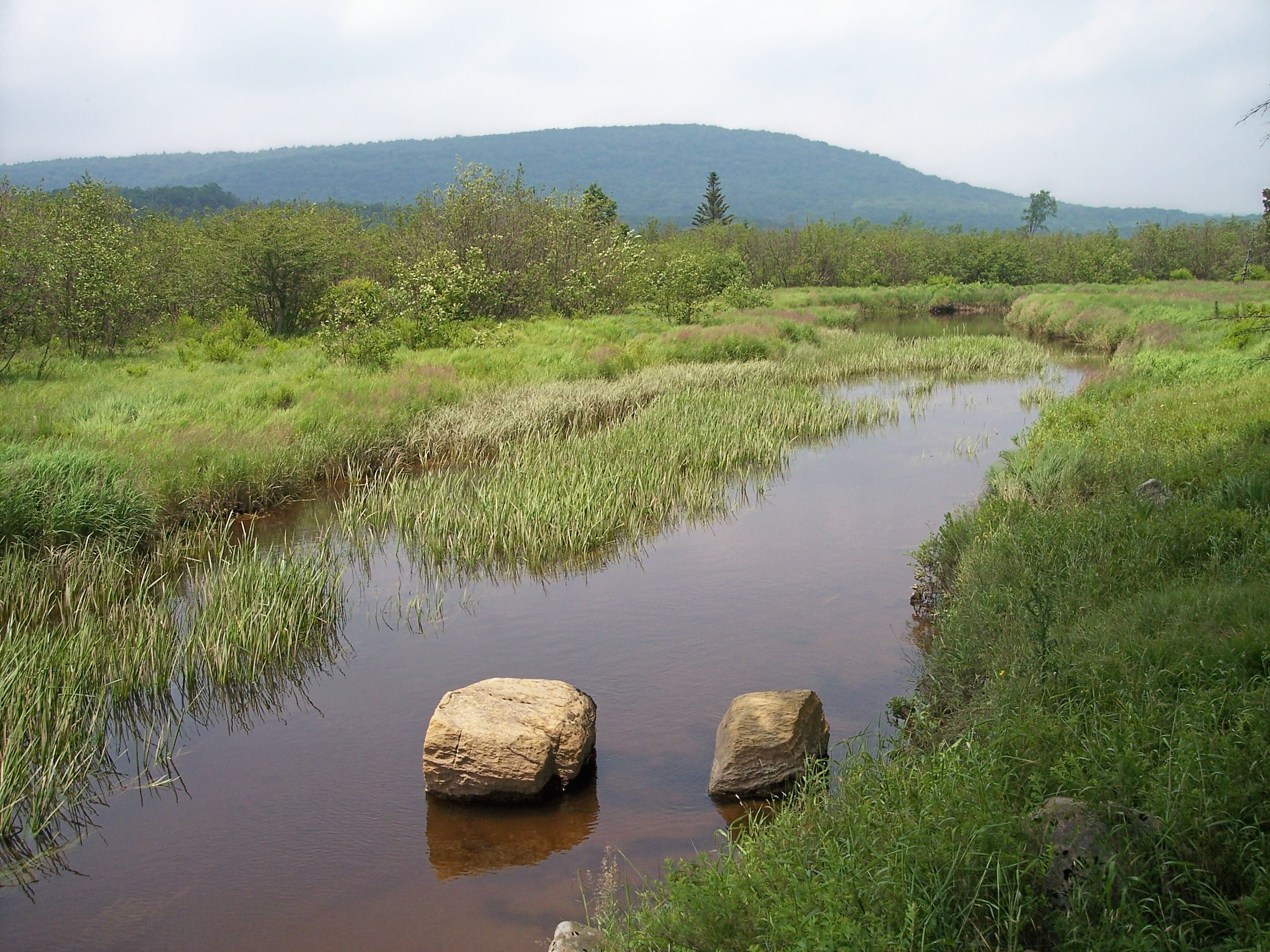
Upper reaches of the Blackwater River in the wetlands of Canaan Valley Resort State Park

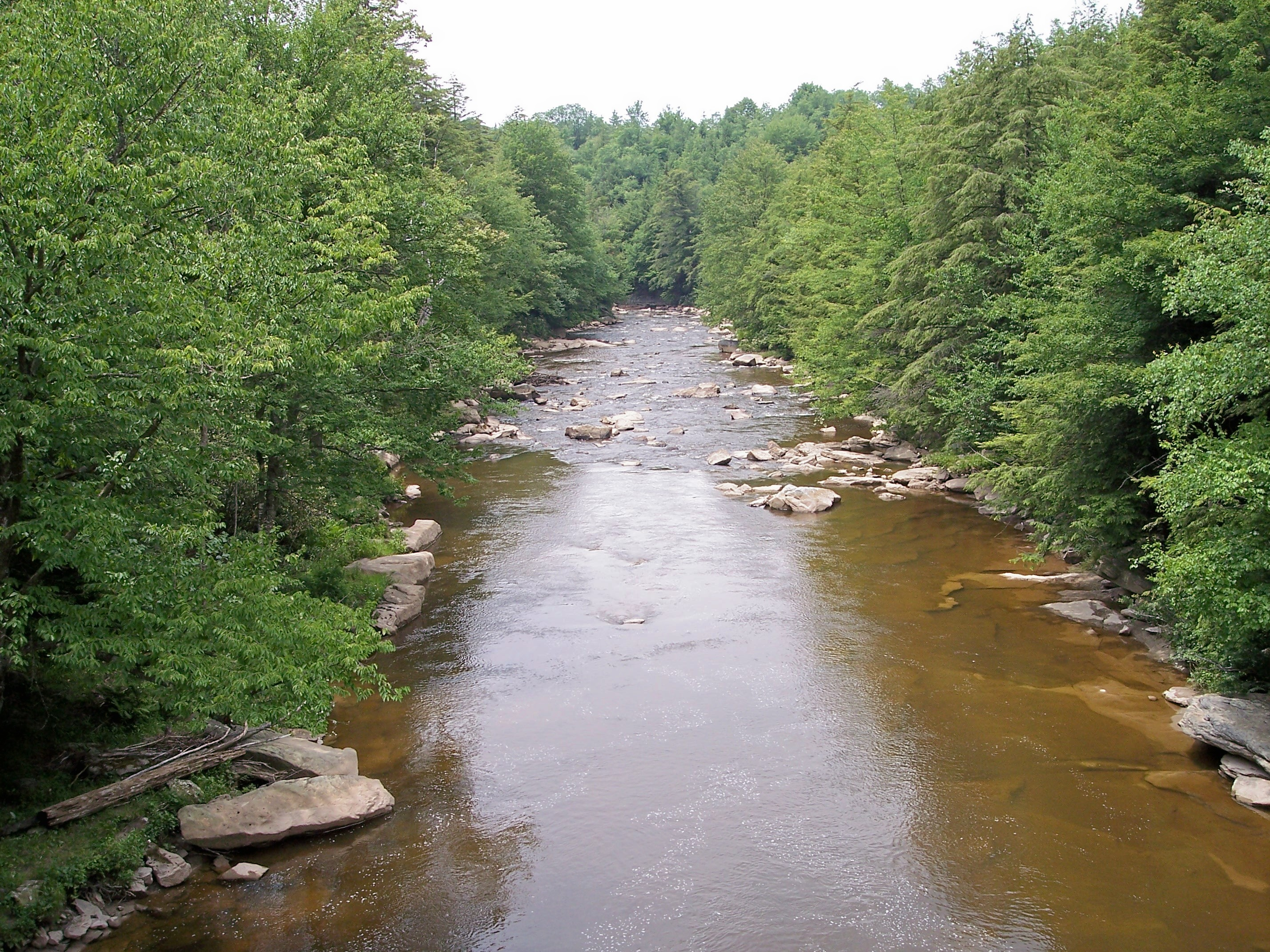
The Blackwater River near where it crosses into Blackwater Falls State Park

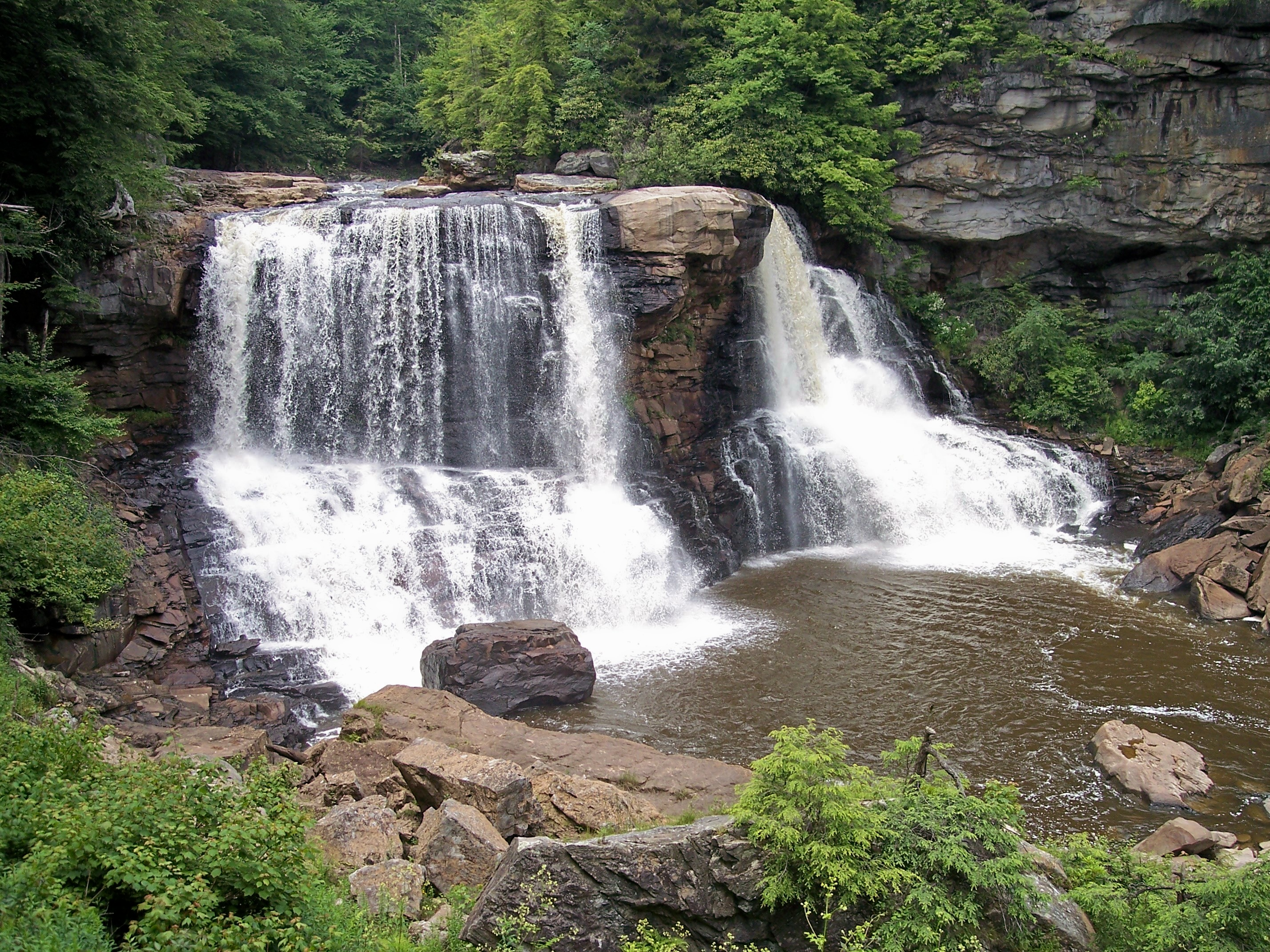
Blackwater Falls drops about 62' in Blackwater Falls State Park

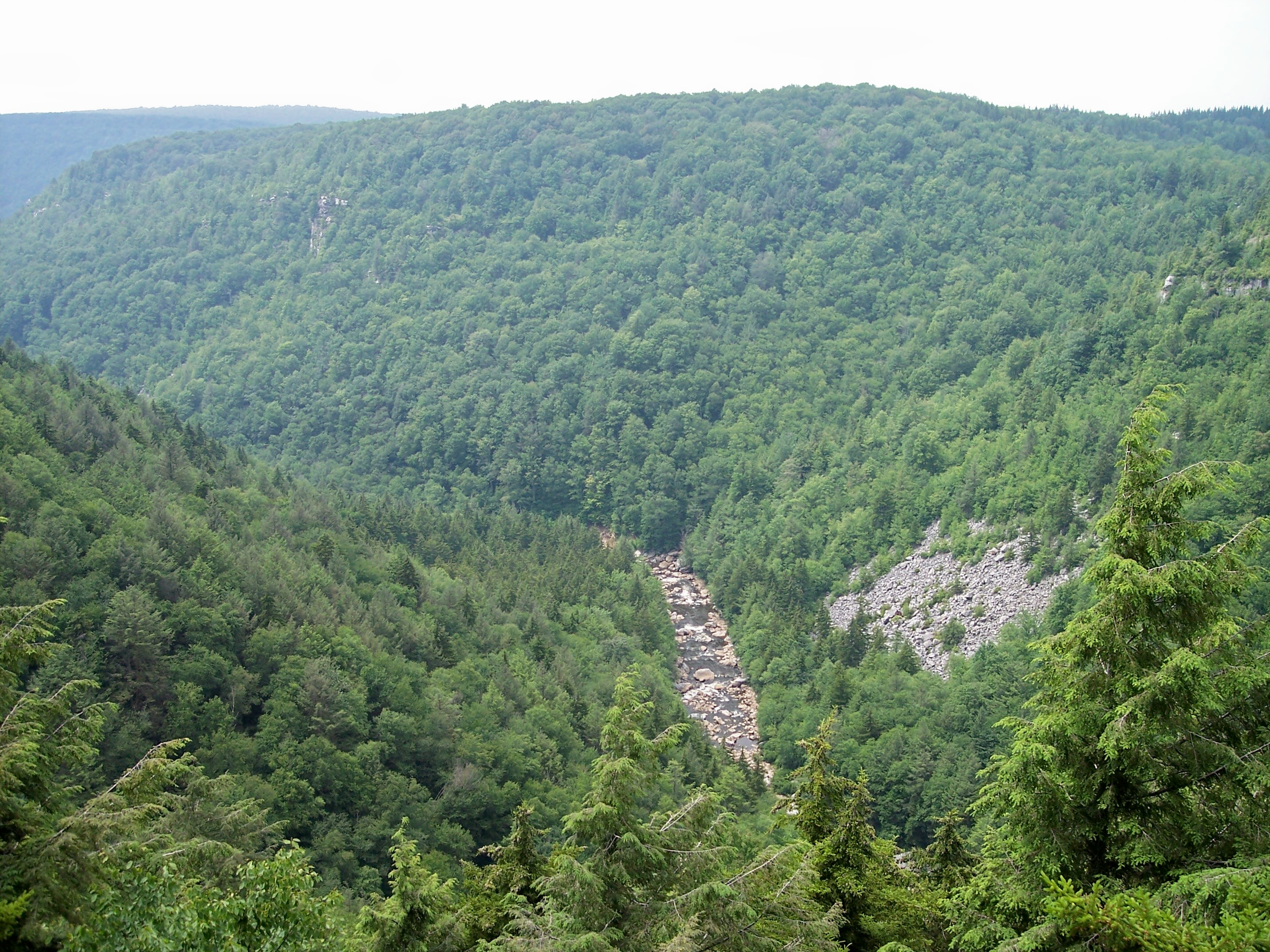
Blackwater River Gorge viewed from the lodge in Blackwater Falls State Park

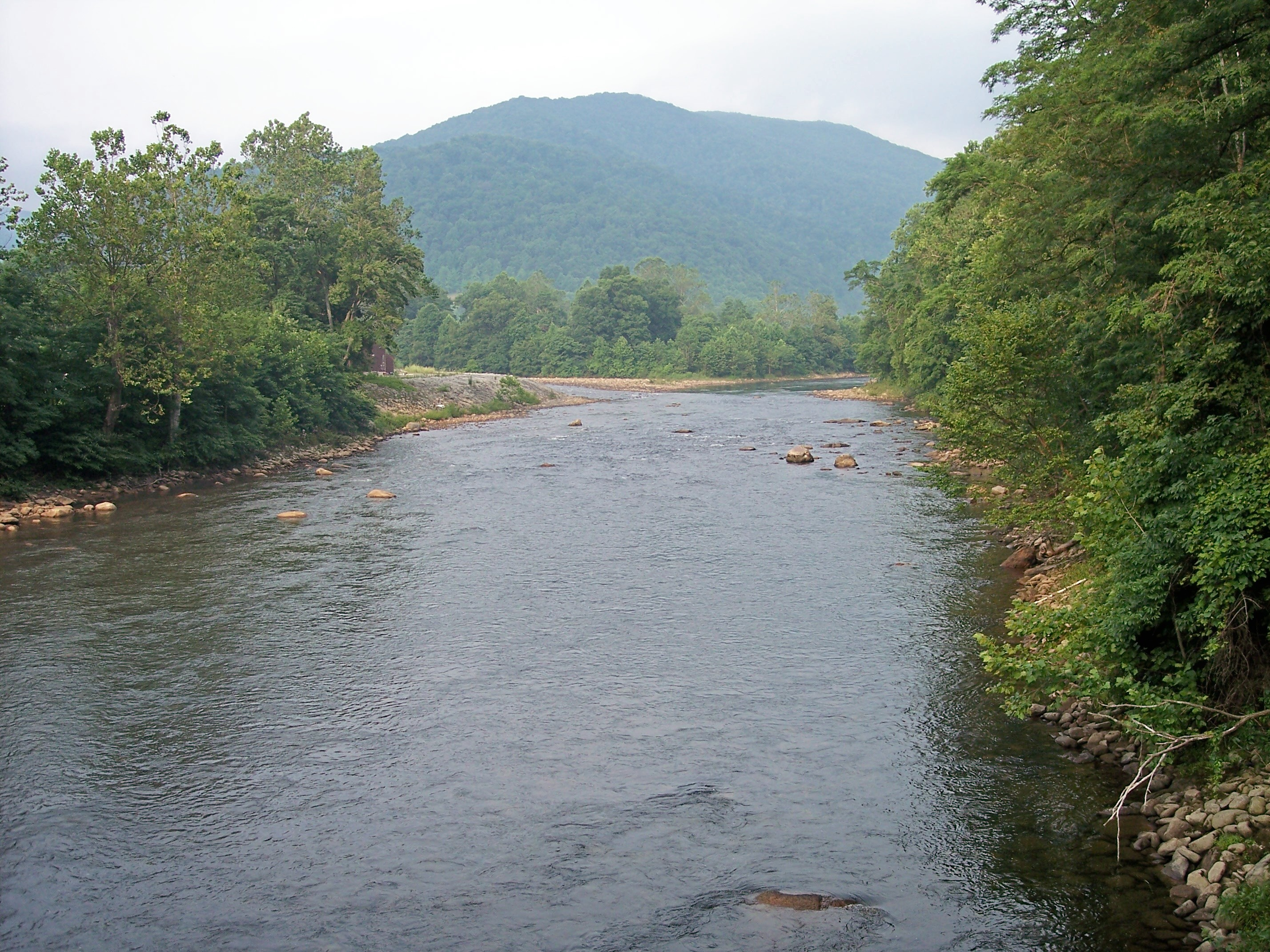
Confluence with Dry Fork to form Black Fork

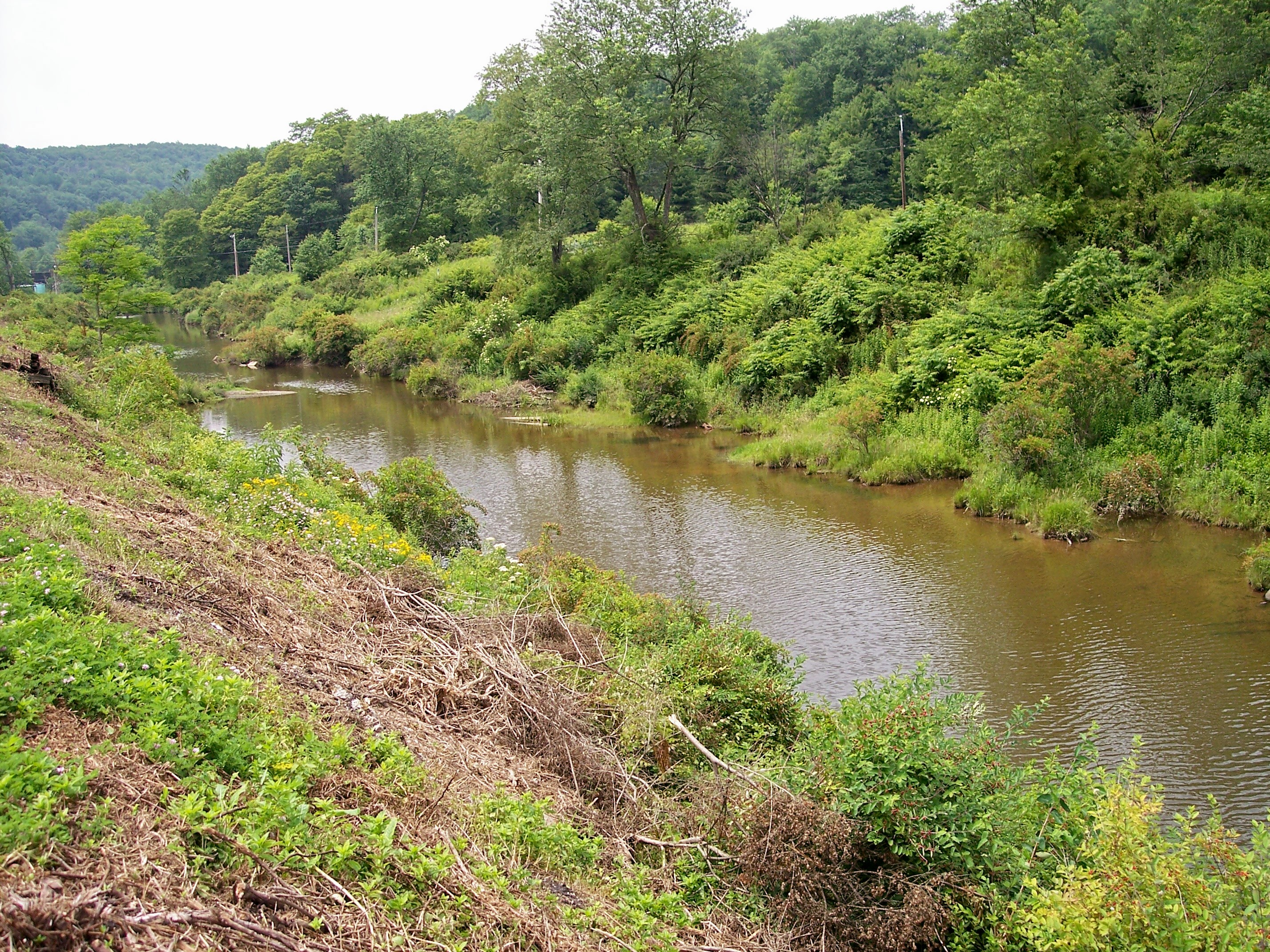
North Fork Blackwater River in Thomas

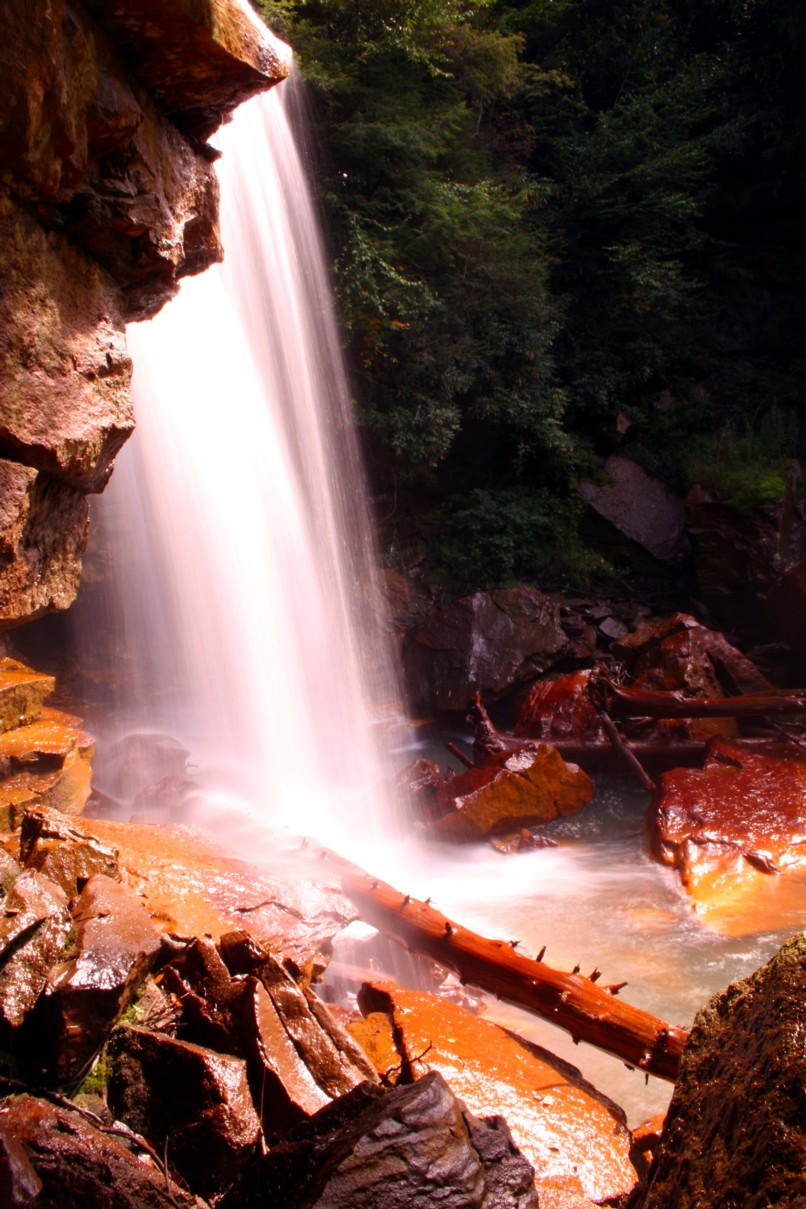
Douglas Falls (North Fork Falls), a drop of about 35' on the North Fork Blackwater River

== River water level ==
Two real time water gauges are available from the United States Geological Survey:

- Blackwater River real time water gauge, 2.8 miles northeast of Davis, West Virginia
- Blackwater River real time water gauge, 0.4 miles southwest of Davis, West Virginia

== See also ==
- List of rivers of West Virginia
