= Black Fork (Cheat River tributary) =

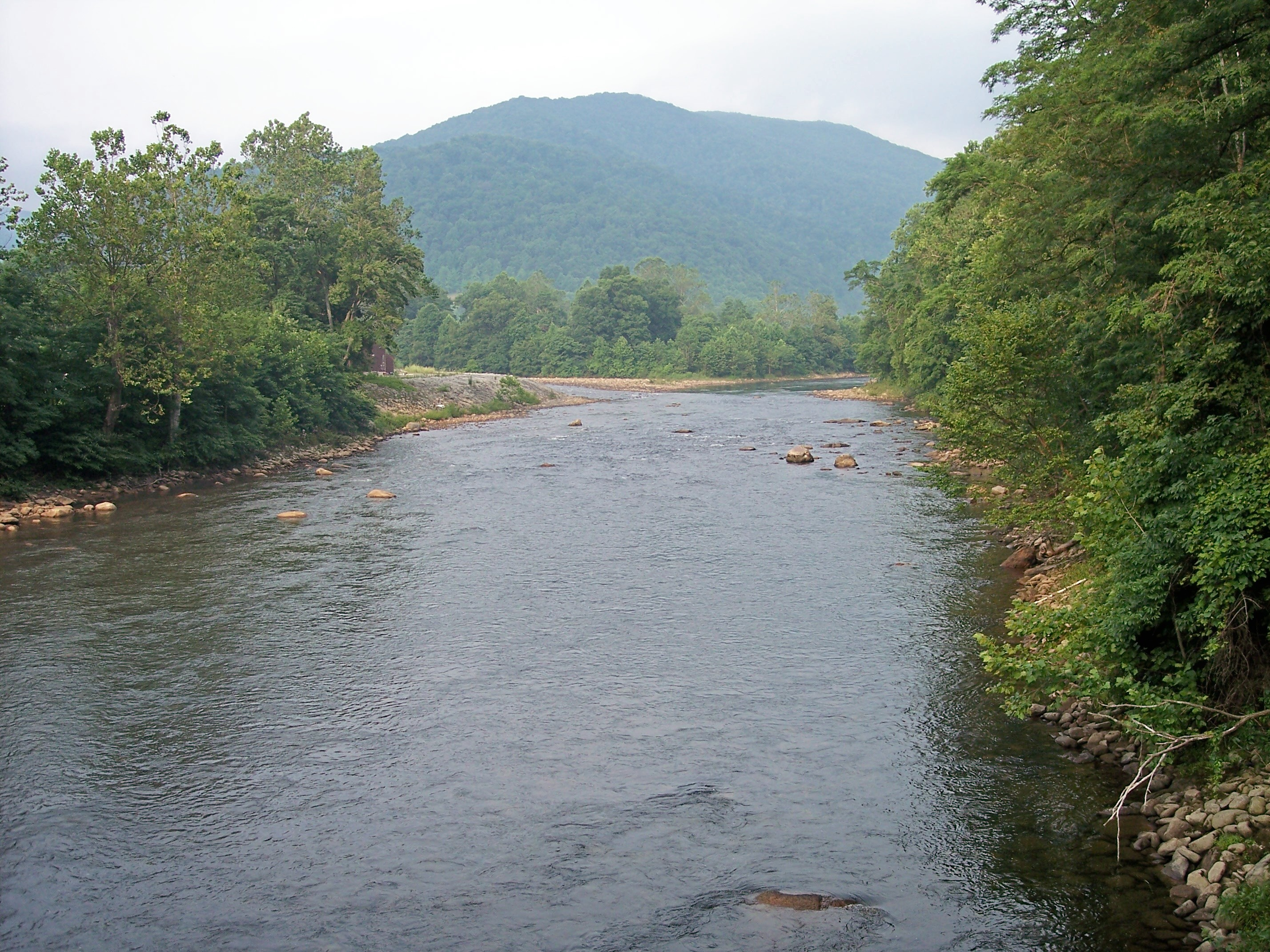
- The Black Fork at Hendricks, West Virginia looking upstream. The confluence of the Blackwater River (left) and the Dry Fork (right) is visible.

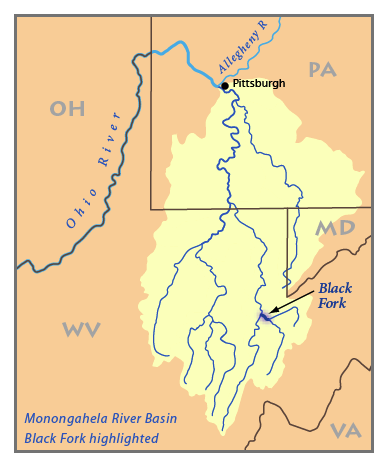
- Map of the Monongahela River basin, with Black Fork highlighted.

Location
- Country: United States
- State: West Virginia
- County: Tucker

Physical characteristics
- Source: Dry Fork
  - location: Col between Harper and Yokum knobs, Randolph County
  - coordinates: 38°44′01″N 79°38′52″W
  - elevation: 3,740 ft (1,140 m)
- 2nd source: Blackwater River
  - location: Canaan Valley, Tucker County
  - coordinates: 39°03′32″N 79°29′04″W
  - elevation: 3,540 ft (1,080 m)
- Source confluence
  - location: Hendricks
  - coordinates: 39°04′20″N 79°37′45″W
  - elevation: 1,700 ft (520 m)
- Mouth: Cheat River
  - location: Parsons
  - coordinates: 39°06′39″N 79°40′44″W
  - elevation: 1,621 ft (494 m)
- Length: 4 mi (6.4 km)
- Basin size: 500 sq mi (1,300 km^{2})

The Black Fork is a principal tributary of the Cheat River in the Allegheny Mountains of eastern West Virginia, USA. It is a short stream, about four miles (6 km) in length, formed by the confluence of two other streams not far above its mouth. It was traditionally considered one of the five Forks of Cheat.

== Geography ==
Via the Cheat, Monongahela and Ohio Rivers, it is part of the watershed of the Mississippi River, draining an area of 500 square miles (1,295 km²). The Black Fork flows for its entire length in Tucker County. It is formed at the town of Hendricks by the confluence of the Dry Fork and the Blackwater River, and flows generally northwestwardly through Hambleton to Parsons, where it joins the Shavers Fork to form the Cheat River.

== Name ==
The U.S. Board on Geographic Names settled on "Black Fork" as the stream's name in 1930. According to the Geographic Names Information System, it has also been known historically as "Blackwater Fork" and as the Blackwater River.

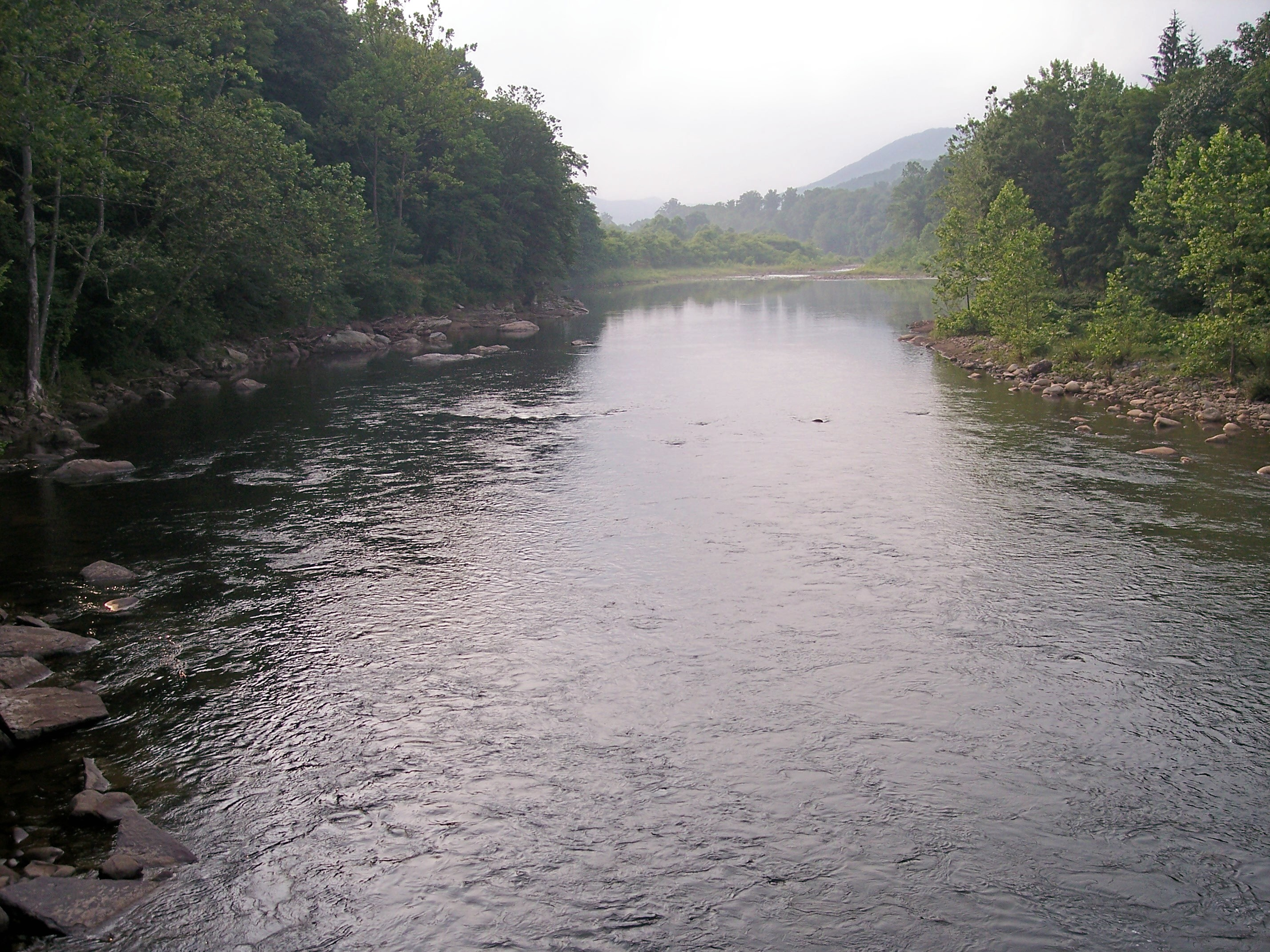
The Black Fork at Hendricks, as viewed downstream

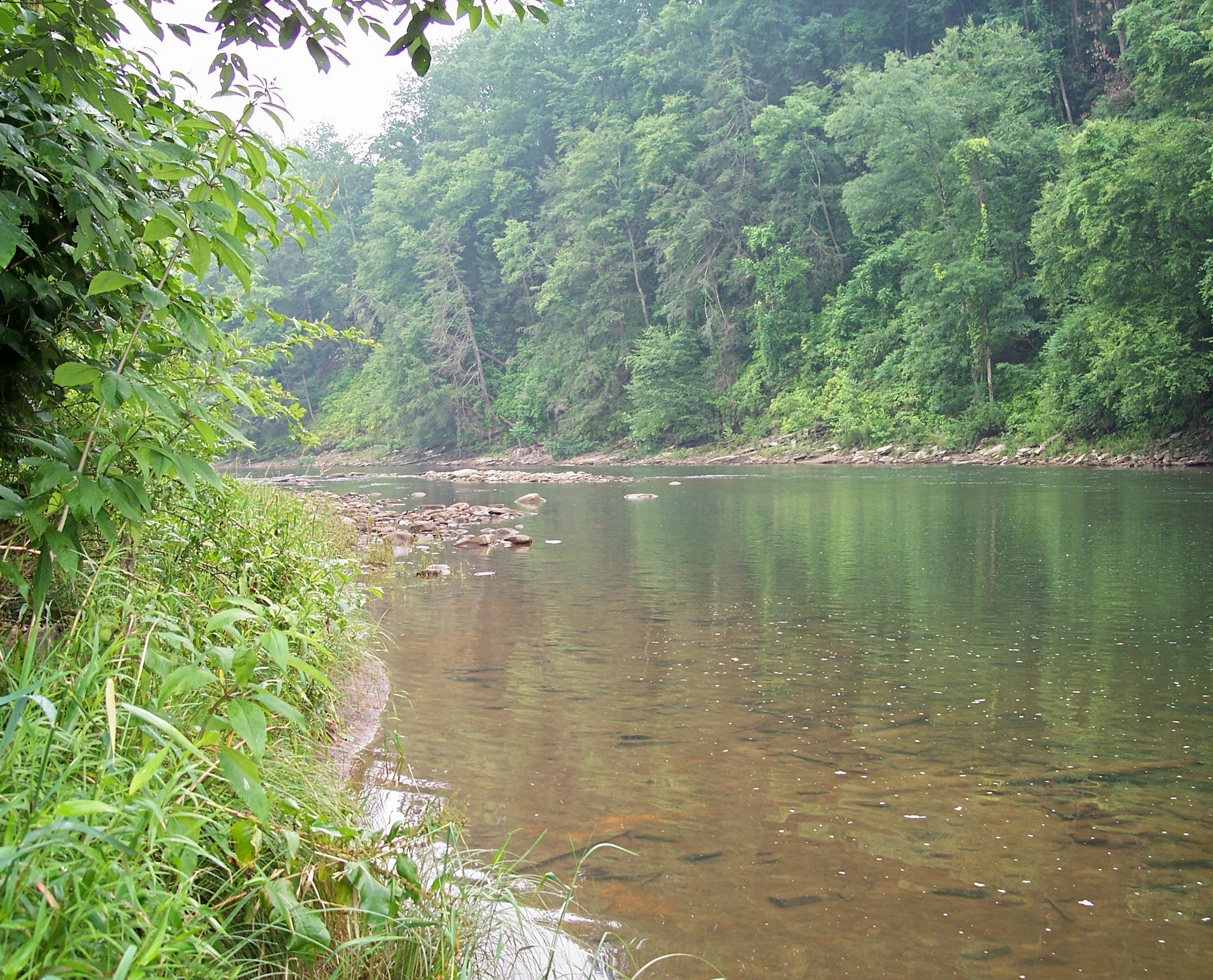
The Black Fork at Parsons

== See also ==
- List of West Virginia rivers
- Blackwater Canyon
