= Harman, West Virginia =

- Town
- Location of Harman in Randolph County, West Virginia.
- Coordinates: 38°55′16″N 79°31′31″W
- Country: United States
- State: West Virginia
- County: Randolph

Area
  - Total: 0.32 sq mi (0.84 km^{2})
  - Land: 0.32 sq mi (0.84 km^{2})
  - Water: 0 sq mi (0.00 km^{2})
- Elevation: 2,359 ft (719 m)

Population (2020)
  - Total: 95
  - Estimate (2021): 95
  - Density: 429.9/sq mi (165.99/km^{2})
- Time zone: UTC-5 (Eastern (EST))
  - Summer (DST): UTC-4 (EDT)
- ZIP code: 26270
- Area code: 304
- FIPS code: 54-35092
- GNIS feature ID: 1551361
- Website: https://local.wv.gov/harman/Pages/default.aspx

Harman is a town in Randolph County, West Virginia, United States. The population was 96 at the 2020 census.

== History ==
The community was named for Rev. Asa Harman, the original owner of the land on which the town is now located. The Day-Vandevander Mill was listed on the National Register of Historic Places in 1987.

== Geography ==
Harman is located in the Potomac Highlands at 38°55′16″N 79°31′31″W (38.921025, -79.525336). The town sits in a valley at the intersection of Route 33/55, which runs east–west, and Route 32 which starts at Harman and heads north to the Canaan Valley area.

According to the United States Census Bureau, the town has a total area of 0.32 square miles (0.83 km^{2}), all land.

== Demographics ==
Historical population
Census	Pop.	Note	%±
1910	149		—
1920	100		−32.9%
1930	114		14.0%
1940	184		61.4%
1950	146		−20.7%
1960	128		−12.3%
1970	142		10.9%
1980	181		27.5%
1990	128		−29.3%
2000	126		−1.6%
2010	143		13.5%
2020	95		−33.6%
2021 (est.)	95	Steady	0.0%
U.S. Decennial Census

=== 2010 census ===
At the 2010 census there were 143 people, 64 households, and 37 families living in the town. The population density was 446.9 inhabitants per square mile (172.5/km^{2}). There were 91 housing units at an average density of 284.4 per square mile (109.8/km^{2}). The racial makeup of the town was 100.0% White. Of the 64 households 28.1% had children under the age of 18 living with them, 40.6% were married couples living together, 12.5% had a female householder with no husband present, 4.7% had a male householder with no wife present, and 42.2% were non-families. 32.8% of households were one person and 14.1% were one person aged 65 or older. The average household size was 2.23 and the average family size was 2.86.

The median age in the town was 43.4 years. 21% of residents were under the age of 18; 7.7% were between the ages of 18 and 24; 25.2% were from 25 to 44; 32.9% were from 45 to 64; and 13.3% were 65 or older. The gender makeup of the town was 45.5% male and 54.5% female.

=== 2000 census ===
At the 2000 census there were 126 people, 54 households, and 38 families living in the town. The population density was 387.1 inhabitants per square mile (147.4/km^{2}). There were 74 housing units at an average density of 227.3 per square mile (86.6/km^{2}). The racial makeup of the town was 99.21% White, and 0.79% from two or more races. Of the 54 households 29.6% had children under the age of 18 living with them, 50.0% were married couples living together, 13.0% had a female householder with no husband present, and 29.6% were non-families. 25.9% of households were one person and 11.1% were one person aged 65 or older. The average household size was 2.33 and the average family size was 2.74.

The age distribution was 21.4% under the age of 18, 6.3% from 18 to 24, 39.7% from 25 to 44, 15.9% from 45 to 64, and 16.7% 65 or older. The median age was 38 years. For every 100 females there were 75.0 males. For every 100 females age 18 and over, there were 80.0 males.

The median household income was $21,136 and the median family income was $31,563. Males had a median income of $21,875 versus $15,714 for females. The per capita income for the town was $13,619. There were 5.4% of families and 13.3% of the population living below the poverty line, including 12.9% of under eighteens and 13.6% of those over 64.

== Notable person ==
Country musician and Grand Ole Opry member Stoney Cooper was born in Harman in 1918.
