= Auvil, West Virginia =

Unincorporated community in West Virginia, United States

Auvil
- Unincorporated community
- Location within the state of West Virginia Auvil (the United States)
- Coordinates: 39°10′40″N 79°43′25″W
- Country: United States
- State: West Virginia
- County: Tucker
- Time zone: UTC-5 (Eastern (EST))
  - Summer (DST): UTC-4 (EDT)
- GNIS feature ID: 1553766

Auvil is an unincorporated community in Tucker County, West Virginia, United States. Auvil is located northwest of St. George on the west bank of the Cheat River. Auvil lies along West Virginia Route 72. According to the Geographic Names Information System, the community has also been known as Auviltown.
