= West Virginia Route 38 =

State highway in West Virginia, United States

West Virginia Route 38

Route information
- Maintained by WVDOH
- Length: 20 mi (32 km)
- Existed: 1957–present

Major junctions
- West end: US 250 near Philippi
- WV 92 concurrent near Nestorville
- East end: WV 72 near St. George

Location
- Country: United States
- State: West Virginia
- Counties: Barbour, Tucker

Highway system
- West Virginia State Highway System; Interstate; US; State
← WV 37	→ WV 39

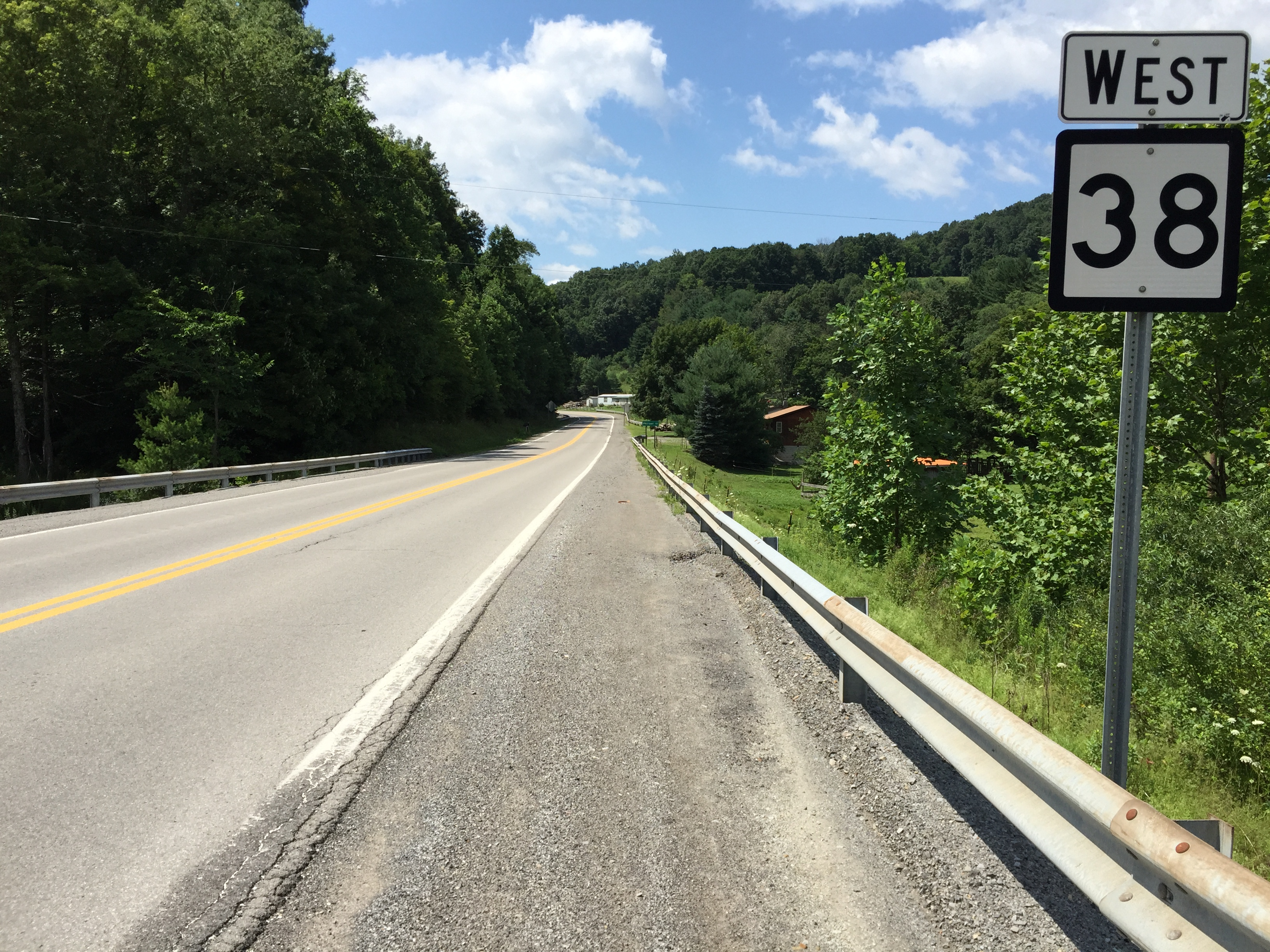
View west along WV 38 at WV 92 in Nestorville

West Virginia Route 38 is an east–west state highway in northern West Virginia. The western terminus of the route is at U.S. Route 250 three miles (5 km) southeast of Philippi. The eastern terminus is at West Virginia Route 72 across the Cheat River from St. George.

Several miles of WV 38 passes through scenic areas of the Monongahela National Forest.

== Major intersections ==
County	Location	mi	km	Destinations	Notes
Barbour	Philippi	0.0	0.0	US 250 – Elkins, Philippi	
Barbour				WV 92 south – Belington	west end of WV 92 overlap
Barbour	Nestorville			WV 92 north – Reedsville	east end of WV 92 overlap
Tucker		20	32	WV 72 – Rowlesburg, Parsons	
1.000 mi = 1.609 km; 1.000 km = 0.621 mi: Concurrency terminus
