= William, West Virginia =

William
- Unincorporated community
- Location within the state of West Virginia William (the United States)
- Coordinates: 39°10′19″N 79°29′33″W
- Country: United States
- State: West Virginia
- County: Tucker
- Time zone: UTC-5 (Eastern (EST))
  - Summer (DST): UTC-4 (EDT)

William is an unincorporated community in the Monongahela National Forest in Tucker County, West Virginia, United States. William lies south of Fairfax and the Fairfax Stone and north of Thomas. The community is at the intersection of U.S. Route 219 and West Virginia Route 90. The Board on Geographic Names officially decided upon William as the town's name in 1895, changing it from Helms.

The community most likely was named after William Davis, a pioneer settler.
