= Lead Mine =

Lead Mine or Leadmine may refer to:

- Lead mine, for the mining of lead

== Places ==
=== United States ===
- Leadmine, Missouri, an unincorporated community
- Lead Mine, West Virginia, an unincorporated community in Tucker County
- Lead Mine, Wisconsin, an unincorporated community in Lafayette County
- Leadmine Wildlife Management Area, in Holland and Sturbridge, Massachusetts

=== Elsewhere ===
- Lead Mine Pass, a mountain pass in Hong Kong
