= Mapledale, West Virginia =

- Unincorporated community
- Location within West Virginia Location within the United States
- Coordinates: 37°50′06″N 80°15′28″W
- Country: United States
- State: West Virginia
- County: Greenbrier
- Elevation: 2,021 ft (616 m)
- Time zone: UTC-5 (Eastern (EST))
  - Summer (DST): UTC-4 (EDT)
- Area codes: 304 & 681
- GNIS feature ID: 1555044

Mapledale is an unincorporated community in Greenbrier County, West Virginia, United States. Mapledale is located on West Virginia Route 92 northwest of White Sulphur Springs.
