= St. George Academy (West Virginia) =

- U.S. National Register of Historic Places
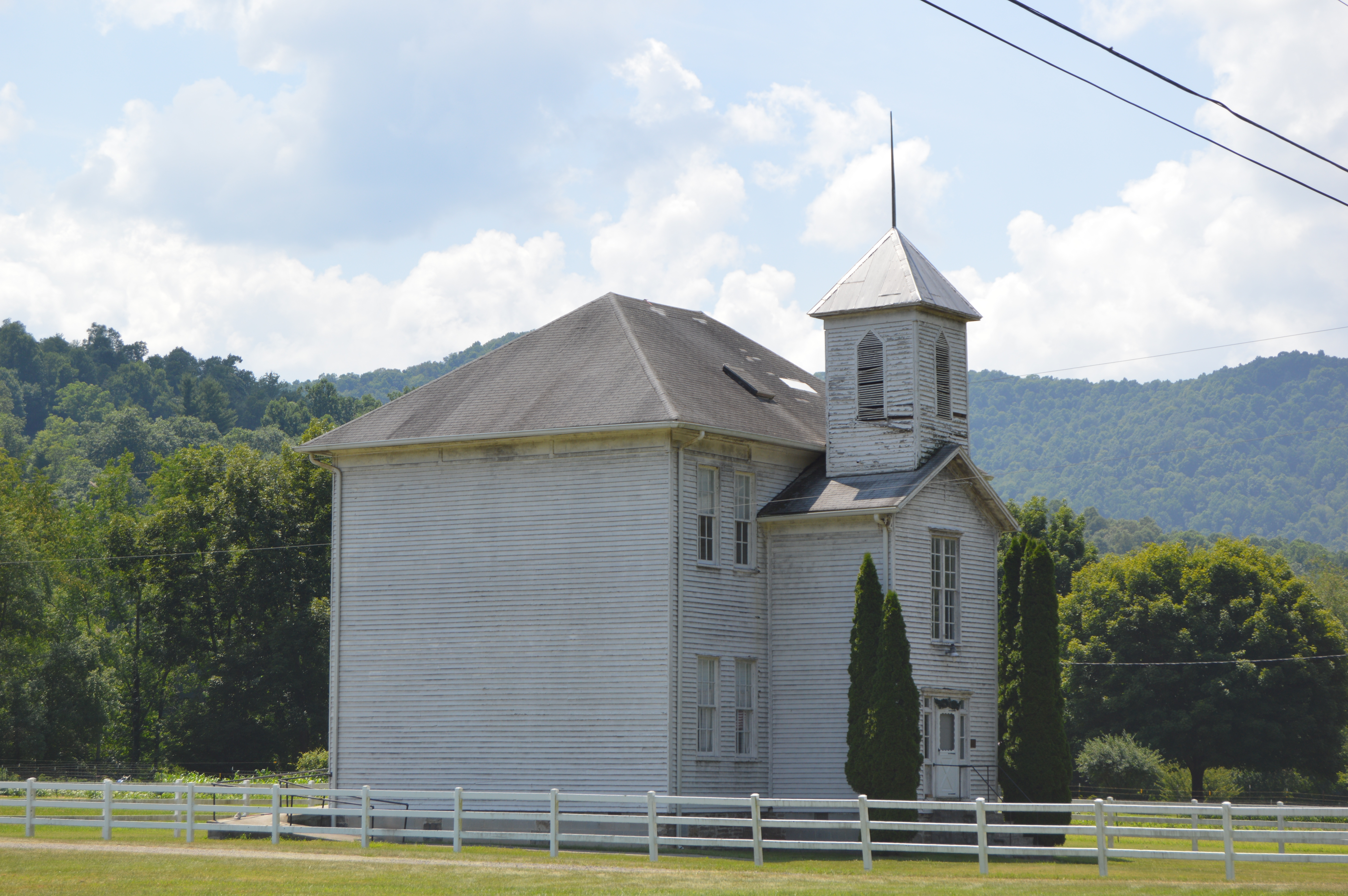
- Front and eastern side

- Location within West Virginia Location within the United States
- Location: Cty. Rd. 1, St. George, West Virginia
- Coordinates: 39°9′49″N 79°41′57″W
- Area: less than one acre
- Built: 1885
- Architect: Daniel L. Dumire
- NRHP reference No.: 01001333
- Added to NRHP: November 29, 2001

St. George Academy is a historic school building located in St. George, Tucker County, West Virginia, United States. Construction started in 1885 and finished in 1886, and is a two-story clapboard building with a projecting bay. It features a square tower with a peaked vent on each side and topped by a pyramidal roof with a spiked finial. In 1975–76, a new school was erected behind the old academy structure, and in 1982, the old school building was condemned by the state fire marshal and ordered to be razed or removed. It was moved to its present site in 1985 by the local historical society, and houses a local history museum.

It was listed on the National Register of Historic Places in 2001.
