= William Ewin =

American politician (1808–1886)

Member of the West Virginia Senate from the 9th district
- In office 1879–1882

Personal details
- Born: October 8, 1808 County Leitrim, Ireland
- Died: November 25, 1886 (aged 78) St. George, West Virginia

William Ewin (October 8, 1808 – November 25, 1886) was an American artisan, lawyer, civil servant and State Senator.

== Early life ==
Ewin was born in County Leitrim, Ireland on October 8, 1808. He then emigrated with his parents to New York City in 1822. From 1830 to 1840 he worked in Philadelphia and Baltimore as a maker of mathematical instruments.

== Tucker County ==
He married Martha Ann Dennis in 1835. In 1840 he moved to Western Ford, Randolph County, Virginia, which today is Saint George, Tucker County, West Virginia. Ewin studied law and lobbied the Virginia General Assembly for the formation of Tucker county, accomplished in 1856.

== Work ==
Ewin served as Postmaster and County Circuit Clerk until barred from public service in 1861 because he, as did other county officials, supported Virginia's secession from the United States.

Ewin used his surveying and legal skills to obtain and sell land grants of many thousand acres. After the Presidential and State amnesties of 1868 and 1871 for secessionists, he was elected Prosecuting Attorney, then to the West Virginia Senate from 1879 to 1882.

== Death and Burial ==
Ewin died November 25, 1886, and is buried in the family graveyard overlooking the Cheat River at Saint George.
