= Virginia State Route 84 =

State highway in Highland County, Virginia, US

State Route 84
- Mill Gap Road

Route information
- Maintained by VDOT
- Length: 14.94 mi (24.04 km)
- Existed: 1940–present

Major junctions
- West end: WV 84 near Mill Gap
- East end: US 220 at Vanderpool

Location
- Country: United States
- State: Virginia
- Counties: Highland

Highway system
- Virginia Routes; Interstate; US; Primary; Secondary; Byways; History; HOT lanes
← SR 83	→ I-85

State Route 84 (SR 84) is a primary state highway in the U.S. state of Virginia. Known as Mill Gap Road, the state highway runs 14.94 miles (24.04 km) from the West Virginia state line near Mill Gap, where the highway continues west as West Virginia Route 84 (WV 84), east to U.S. Route 220 (US 220) at Vanderpool.

== Route description ==
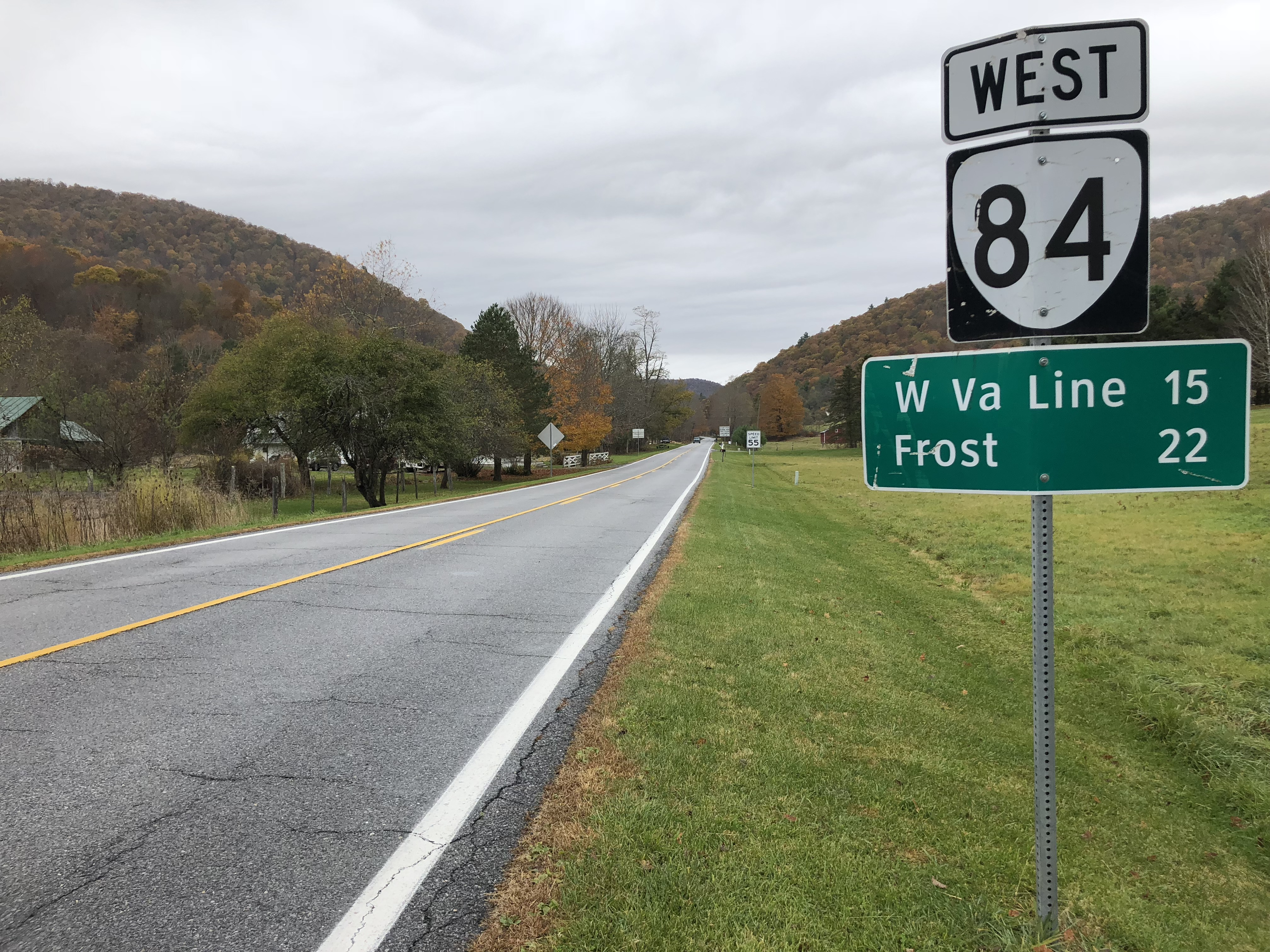
View west from the east end of SR 84 at US 220 in Vanderpool

SR 84 begins at the top of Allegheny Mountain, which coincides with the Virginia – West Virginia state line and the Eastern Continental Divide. The highway continues west as WV 84, which descends the west side of the mountain to its terminus at WV 92 in Frost. The state highway passes through a pair of hairpin turns as it descends to Townsend Draft. At the draft's mouth at Back Creek, SR 84 turns north and follows Back Creek to Mill Gap, where the highway turns east and follows East Back Creek through its water gap between Little Mountain and Lantz Mountain. The state highway turns north and follows the valley through the hamlet of Mill Gap to Meadowdale. There, SR 84 turns east and follows the Jackson River through Vanderpool Gap between Monterey Mountain and Back Creek Mountain to its eastern terminus at US 220 (Jackson River Road) in the hamlet of Vanderpool south of the Highland County seat of Monterey.

== History ==
Until 1933, SR 84 was part of State Route 39. It became State Route 271 in the 1933 renumbering, and in the 1940 renumbering it was renumbered State Route 84 to match West Virginia Route 84.

Although SR 39 was defined (as SR 9) in 1918, its location west of Monterey was not finalized to follow the present SR 84 until 1923.

== Major intersections ==
The entire route is in Highland County.

Location	mi	km	Destinations	Notes
	0.00	0.00	WV 84 west – Frost	West Virginia state line; western terminus
Vanderpool	14.94	24.04	US 220 (Jackson River Road) – Monterey, Warm Springs	Eastern terminus
1.000 mi = 1.609 km; 1.000 km = 0.621 mi
