= Hazelwood, West Virginia =

- Unincorporated community
- Location within West Virginia Location within the United States
- Coordinates: 38°51′41″N 79°51′35″W
- Country: United States
- State: West Virginia
- County: Randolph
- Elevation: 1,995 ft (608 m)
- Time zone: UTC-5 (Eastern (EST))
  - Summer (DST): UTC-4 (EDT)
- Area codes: 304 & 681
- GNIS feature ID: 1554671

Hazelwood is an unincorporated community in Randolph County, West Virginia, United States. Hazelwood is located along the Tygart Valley River on U.S. routes 219 and 250, West Virginia Route 55, and West Virginia Route 92, 4.5 miles (7.2 km) south of Elkins.
