= Davis Coal and Coke Company Administrative Building =

- U.S. National Register of Historic Places
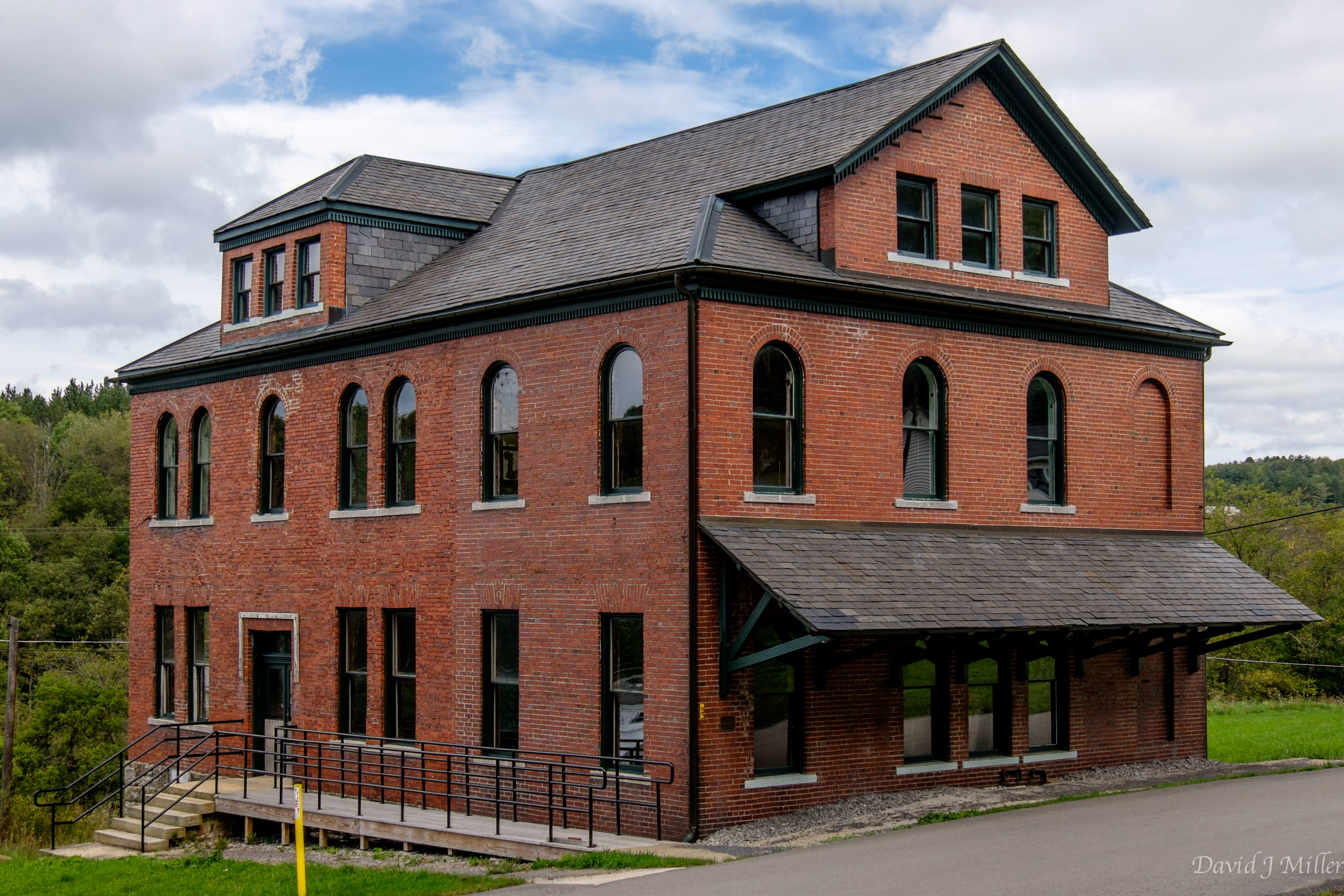

- Location within West Virginia Location within the United States
- Location: 570 Douglas Rd., Thomas, West Virginia
- Coordinates: 39°08′33″N 79°30′12″W
- Area: 0.36 acres (0.15 ha)
- Built: 1900, c. 1903
- NRHP reference No.: 11000733
- Added to NRHP: October 6, 2011

Davis Coal and Coke Company Administrative Building, also known as Western Maryland Railway Engineering Building and Old Western Maryland Railroad Office, is a historic office building located at Thomas, Tucker County, West Virginia. It was built in 1900 and expanded about in 1903, and is a two-story, red brick office building. The rectangular plan building measures approximately 40 feet by 70 feet. It has a hipped roof with secondary dormer windows. It served as the "field operating office" or "mining headquarters" for Davis Coal and Coke Company from 1900 to 1950. It was then used by Western Maryland Railway until closing in 1982.

It was listed on the National Register of Historic Places in 2011.
