= Wild Meadow, West Virginia =

- Unincorporated community
- Location within West Virginia Location within the United States
- Coordinates: 37°51′50″N 80°14′17″W
- Country: United States
- State: West Virginia
- County: Greenbrier
- Elevation: 2,165 ft (660 m)
- Time zone: UTC-5 (Eastern (EST))
  - Summer (DST): UTC-4 (EDT)
- Area codes: 304 & 681
- GNIS feature ID: 1553445

Wild Meadow is an unincorporated community in Greenbrier County, West Virginia, United States. Wild Meadow is located on West Virginia Route 92, 5.5 miles (8.9 km) northeast of White Sulphur Springs.
