= West Virginia Route 84 =

State highway in West Virginia, United States

West Virginia Route 84

Route information
- Maintained by WVDOH
- Length: 4.6 mi (7.4 km)

Major junctions
- West end: WV 92 in Frost
- East end: SR 84 near Frost

Location
- Country: United States
- State: West Virginia
- Counties: Pocahontas

Highway system
- West Virginia State Highway System; Interstate; US; State
← WV 83	→ WV 85

West Virginia Route 84 is an east–west state highway located within Pocahontas County, West Virginia. The western terminus of the route is at West Virginia Route 92 in Frost. The eastern terminus is at the Virginia state line five miles (8 km) east of Frost, where WV 84 continues east as State Route 84.

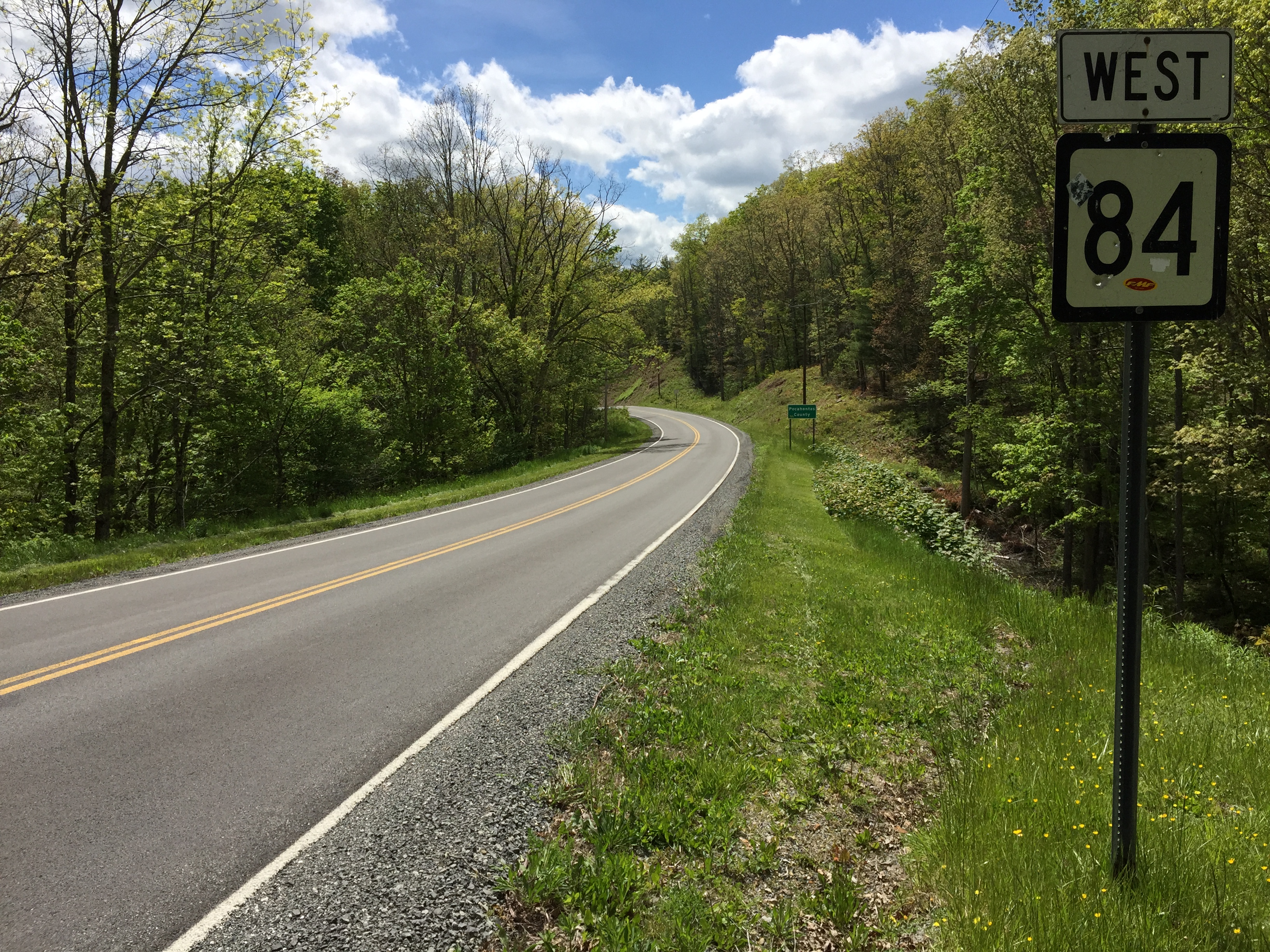
View west from the east end of WV 84 at SR 84 at the Virginia border near Frost

== Major intersections ==
The entire route is in Pocahontas County.

Location	mi	km	Destinations	Notes
Frost			WV 92 – White Sulphur Springs, Green Bank	
			SR 84 east – Vanderpool	Virginia state line
1.000 mi = 1.609 km; 1.000 km = 0.621 mi
