= Elk, Tucker County, West Virginia =

Unincorporated community in West Virginia, United States

Elk
- Unincorporated community
- Location within the state of West Virginia Elk (the United States)
- Coordinates: 39°1′18″N 79°32′16″W
- Country: United States
- State: West Virginia
- County: Tucker
- Time zone: UTC-5 (Eastern (EST))
  - Summer (DST): UTC-4 (EDT)

Elk is an unincorporated community in Tucker County in the U.S. state of West Virginia. The community's name is derived from its earlier one, Elklick. Elk is located on West Virginia Route 72.
