= Gatzmer, Tucker County, West Virginia =

Unincorporated community in West Virginia, United States

Gatzmer
- Unincorporated community
- Location within the state of West Virginia Gatzmer (the United States)
- Coordinates: 39°11′6″N 79°23′0″W
- Country: United States
- State: West Virginia
- County: Tucker
- Elevation: 3,251 ft (991 m)
- Time zone: UTC-5 (Eastern (EST))
  - Summer (DST): UTC-4 (EDT)
- GNIS ID: 1554540

Gatzmer is an unincorporated community in Tucker County, West Virginia, United States.
