= Benbush, West Virginia =

Unincorporated community in West Virginia, United States

Benbush
- Unincorporated community
- Location within the state of West Virginia Benbush (the United States)
- Coordinates: 39°9′31″N 79°31′15″W
- Country: United States
- State: West Virginia
- County: Tucker
- Time zone: UTC-5 (Eastern (EST))
  - Summer (DST): UTC-4 (EDT)
- GNIS feature ID: 1553858

Benbush is an unincorporated community and coal town in Tucker County, West Virginia, United States. Benbush is located to the northwest of Thomas along West Virginia Secondary Route 18.

The community derives its name from Benjamin Bush, a businessperson in the coal mining industry.
