= Gladwin, West Virginia =

Unincorporated community in West Virginia, United States

Gladwin
- Unincorporated community
- Location within the state of West Virginia Gladwin (the United States)
- Coordinates: 39°0′25″N 79°32′41″W
- Country: United States
- State: West Virginia
- County: Tucker
- Time zone: UTC-5 (Eastern (EST))
  - Summer (DST): UTC-4 (EDT)

Gladwin is an unincorporated community in Tucker County in the U.S. state of West Virginia. It is situated at the point where Glady Fork discharges into Dry Fork of Cheat River.

In 1943 and '44, the U.S. Army taught pack mule techniques at a mule school set up near Gladwin as part of the West Virginia Maneuver Area.
