= Hovatter, West Virginia =

Hovatter
- Unincorporated community
- Location within the state of West Virginia Hovatter (the United States)
- Coordinates: 39°14′6″N 79°45′18″W
- Country: United States
- State: West Virginia
- County: Tucker
- Elevation: 1,680 ft (510 m)
- Time zone: UTC-5 (Eastern (EST))
  - Summer (DST): UTC-4 (EDT)
- GNIS ID: 1551510

Hovatter is an unincorporated community in Tucker County, West Virginia, United States.

The community was named after Christopher Hovatter, a pioneer settler.
