= Tucker County Schools =

School district in West Virginia, United States

Tucker County Schools is the operating school district within Tucker County, West Virginia. It is governed by the Tucker County Board of Education.

County Administrative Staff

- Superintendent Alicia Lambert
- Director of Support Services Jonathan Hicks
- Director of Finance Tracy Brenneman
- Director of Technology Todd Romero

== Schools ==
=== High schools ===
- Tucker County High School

=== Elementary middle schools ===
- Davis-Thomas Elementary Middle School
- Tucker Valley Elementary Middle School

== Schools no longer in operation ==
- Davis High School
- Hamrick Elementary School
- Mountaineer High School
- Parsons Elementary Middle School
- Parsons High School
- St. George Elementary School
- Thomas High School
