= Pleasant Vale, West Virginia =

Pleasant Vale
- Unincorporated community
- Location within the state of West Virginia Pleasant Vale (the United States)
- Coordinates: 39°9′55″N 79°37′55″W
- Country: United States
- State: West Virginia
- County: Tucker
- Elevation: 1,640 ft (500 m)
- Time zone: UTC-5 (Eastern (EST))
  - Summer (DST): UTC-4 (EDT)
- GNIS ID: 1689398

Pleasant Vale is an unincorporated community in Tucker County, West Virginia, United States.
