= Shafer, West Virginia =

Shafer
- Unincorporated community
- Location within the state of West Virginia Shafer (the United States)
- Coordinates: 39°13′9″N 79°34′4″W
- Country: United States
- State: West Virginia
- County: Tucker
- Elevation: 1,867 ft (569 m)
- Time zone: UTC-5 (Eastern (EST))
  - Summer (DST): UTC-4 (EDT)
- GNIS ID: 1552839

Shafer is an unincorporated community in Tucker County, West Virginia. Its post office has ceased to exist.
