= Red Creek, West Virginia =

- Unincorporated community
- Location within West Virginia Location within the United States
- Coordinates: 39°00′03″N 79°29′50″W
- Country: United States
- State: West Virginia
- County: Tucker
- Elevation: 2,595 ft (791 m)
- Time zone: UTC-5 (Eastern (EST))
  - Summer (DST): UTC-4 (EDT)
- ZIP code: 26289
- Area codes: 304 & 681
- GNIS feature ID: 1552599

Red Creek is an unincorporated community in Tucker County, West Virginia, United States. Red Creek is located on West Virginia Route 72, 12 miles (19 km) southeast of Parsons. Red Creek has a post office with ZIP code 26289. Originally called Flanangan Hill after early settler Ebenezer Flanagan, the community was named Red Creek by the community's first postmaster William Raines. Being a Democrat, Raines refused to name the post office after the Republican Flanagan family, and thus named it for a nearby creek. The Red Creek post office was established in 1856.

== Climate ==
The climate in this area has mild differences between highs and lows, and there is adequate rainfall year-round. According to the Köppen Climate Classification system, Red Creek has a marine west coast climate, abbreviated "Cfb" on climate maps.

Elkins 21 ENE is a weather station located above Red Creek on the Canaan Valley Plateau, near the Canaan Valley Ski Resort.

Climate data for Elkins 21 ENE, West Virginia, 1991–2020 normals: 3390ft (1033m)
Month	Jan	Feb	Mar	Apr	May	Jun	Jul	Aug	Sep	Oct	Nov	Dec	Year
Record high °F (°C)	63 (17)	70 (21)	76 (24)	82 (28)	82 (28)	87 (31)	86 (30)	83 (28)	84 (29)	82 (28)	74 (23)	65 (18)	87 (31)
Mean maximum °F (°C)	56.9 (13.8)	56.8 (13.8)	67.4 (19.7)	76.1 (24.5)	78.8 (26.0)	80.2 (26.8)	81.3 (27.4)	80.4 (26.9)	79.8 (26.6)	74.9 (23.8)	67.5 (19.7)	58.7 (14.8)	81.5 (27.5)
Mean daily maximum °F (°C)	33.5 (0.8)	36.5 (2.5)	44.3 (6.8)	56.8 (13.8)	63.9 (17.7)	70.6 (21.4)	74.1 (23.4)	73.2 (22.9)	68.1 (20.1)	58.6 (14.8)	47.0 (8.3)	37.9 (3.3)	55.4 (13.0)
Daily mean °F (°C)	25.8 (−3.4)	28.2 (−2.1)	35.9 (2.2)	46.1 (7.8)	54.8 (12.7)	61.7 (16.5)	65.2 (18.4)	64.3 (17.9)	58.5 (14.7)	48.7 (9.3)	38.6 (3.7)	30.7 (−0.7)	46.5 (8.1)
Mean daily minimum °F (°C)	18.2 (−7.7)	20.0 (−6.7)	27.5 (−2.5)	35.3 (1.8)	45.7 (7.6)	52.8 (11.6)	56.3 (13.5)	55.4 (13.0)	48.9 (9.4)	38.9 (3.8)	30.2 (−1.0)	23.5 (−4.7)	37.7 (3.2)
Mean minimum °F (°C)	−3.9 (−19.9)	−1.2 (−18.4)	7.2 (−13.8)	19.6 (−6.9)	30.1 (−1.1)	39.4 (4.1)	44.9 (7.2)	44.1 (6.7)	34.4 (1.3)	24.9 (−3.9)	12.9 (−10.6)	4.4 (−15.3)	−5.9 (−21.1)
Record low °F (°C)	−16 (−27)	−13 (−25)	−7 (−22)	9 (−13)	21 (−6)	31 (−1)	38 (3)	40 (4)	29 (−2)	20 (−7)	1 (−17)	−9 (−23)	−16 (−27)
Average precipitation inches (mm)	4.75 (121)	4.42 (112)	5.27 (134)	5.12 (130)	5.77 (147)	5.30 (135)	5.72 (145)	4.18 (106)	3.97 (101)	3.70 (94)	3.76 (96)	4.75 (121)	56.71 (1,442)
Average snowfall inches (cm)	33.7 (86)	27.3 (69)	23.1 (59)	12.2 (31)	0.3 (0.76)	0.0 (0.0)	0.0 (0.0)	0.0 (0.0)	0.0 (0.0)	1.6 (4.1)	11.7 (30)	23.5 (60)	133.4 (339.86)
Source 1: NOAA(1981-2010 Canaan Valley Snowfall)
Source 2: XMACIS2 (records & monthly max/mins)
