= Mackeyville, West Virginia =

Mackeyville
- Unincorporated community
- Location within the state of West Virginia Mackeyville (the United States)
- Coordinates: 39°6′44″N 79°37′0″W
- Country: United States
- State: West Virginia
- County: Tucker

Government
- Elevation: 2,589 ft (789 m)
- Time zone: UTC-5 (Eastern (EST))
  - Summer (DST): UTC-4 (EDT)
- GNIS ID: 1689381

Mackeyville is an unincorporated community in Tucker County, West Virginia, United States.
