= Porterwood, West Virginia =

Porterwood
- Unincorporated community
- Location within the state of West Virginia Porterwood (the United States)
- Coordinates: 39°4′11″N 79°41′53″W
- Country: United States
- State: West Virginia
- County: Tucker
- Elevation: 1,690 ft (520 m)
- Time zone: UTC-5 (Eastern (EST))
  - Summer (DST): UTC-4 (EDT)
- GNIS ID: 1552542

Porterwood is an unincorporated community in Tucker County, West Virginia, United States.

The community was named after William Porter, a railroad builder.
