= Pleasant Run, West Virginia =

Pleasant Run
- Unincorporated community
- Location within the state of West Virginia Pleasant Run (the United States)
- Coordinates: 39°2′39″N 79°43′24″W
- Country: United States
- State: West Virginia
- County: Tucker
- Elevation: 1,742 ft (531 m)
- Time zone: UTC-5 (Eastern (EST))
  - Summer (DST): UTC-4 (EDT)
- GNIS ID: 1552507

Pleasant Run is an unincorporated community in Tucker County, West Virginia, United States.
