= Mill Gap, Virginia =

Unincorporated community in Virginia, United States

- Unincorporated community
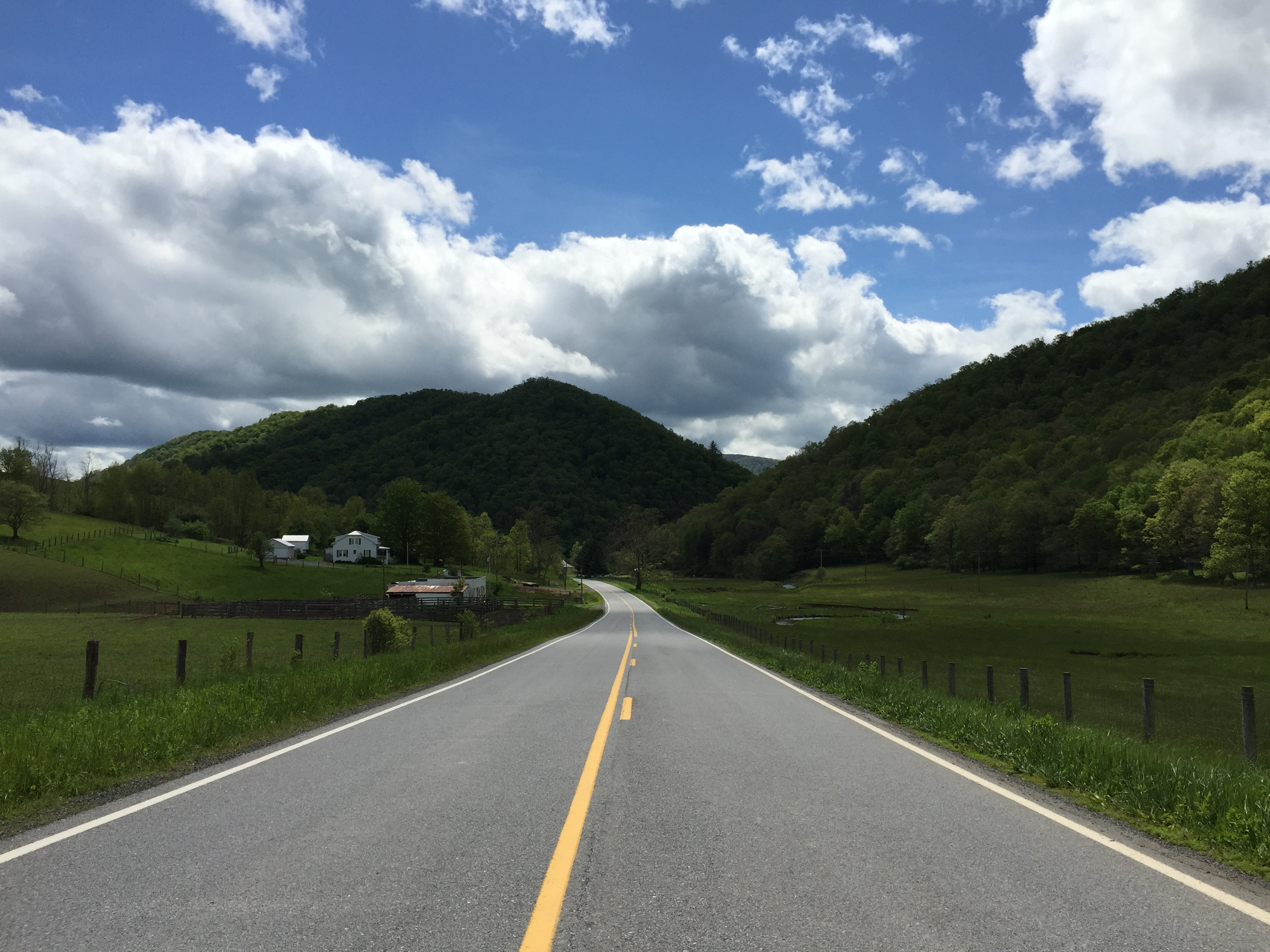

- Location within Virginia Location within the United States
- Coordinates: 38°19′18″N 79°42′14″W
- Country: United States
- State: Virginia
- County: Highland
- Elevation: 2,533 ft (772 m)
- Time zone: UTC-5 (Eastern (EST))
  - Summer (DST): UTC-4 (EDT)
- ZIP code: 24465
- Area code: 540
- GNIS feature ID: 1497017

Mill Gap (also Green Hill, Millgap, or Rucksmanville) is an unincorporated community and small rural village in Highland County, Virginia, United States. Mill Gap is located 9.1 miles (14.6 km) southwest of Monterey on Virginia State Route 84. The community is located near a water gap of the same name that separates the ridges of Lantz Mountain and Little Mountain through which the East Back Creek flows. As of 2015, the community consisted only of a general store and a church, with attached residences.
