= Canaan Heights, West Virginia =

Unincorporated community in West Virginia, United States

Canaan Heights
- Unincorporated community
- Location within the state of West Virginia Canaan Heights (the United States)
- Coordinates: 39°5′53″N 79°25′50″W
- Country: United States
- State: West Virginia
- County: Tucker
- Time zone: UTC-5 (Eastern (EST))
  - Summer (DST): UTC-4 (EDT)

Canaan Heights is an unincorporated community in Tucker County, West Virginia, United States. Canaan Heights is located on West Virginia Route 32, south of Davis.

As of 2006, it had a large, mature plantation of Norway spruce (Picea abies).

In May 2023, Canaan Heights reported 20.3 inches of snowfall, the largest May snowstorm recorded in the history of West Virginia.
