= Lead Mine, West Virginia =

Lead Mine
- Unincorporated community
- Location within the state of West Virginia Lead Mine (the United States)
- Coordinates: 39°11′40″N 79°35′5″W
- Country: United States
- State: West Virginia
- County: Tucker
- Elevation: 1,762 ft (537 m)
- Time zone: UTC-5 (Eastern (EST))
  - Summer (DST): UTC-4 (EDT)
- GNIS ID: 1557462

Lead Mine is an unincorporated community in Tucker County, West Virginia, United States.

The community was named after nearby Leadmine Run creek.
