= Tucker County Seat War =

1893 dispute in Tucker County, West Virginia

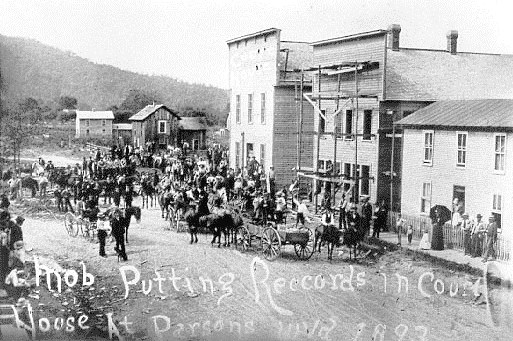
- Vigilantes putting the captured records into the courthouse in Parsons.
- Date: June 1893
- Location: Tucker County, West Virginia, United States
- Outcome: Parsons becomes the county seat of Tucker County
- Deaths: None

The Tucker County Seat War (1893) was a dispute between the towns of Parsons and St. George, in Tucker County, West Virginia, over which should be the county seat.

== History ==
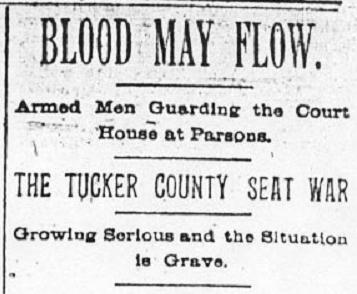
A headline from The Intelligencer warns of violence following the courthouse raid in 1893

Tucker County, Virginia (now West Virginia) was created in 1856 out of Randolph County. At that time, the enabling act also called for the county seat, where the county court would be located, to be in Westernford, originally known as "Fort Minear" and first settled in 1776. The name of the town was directed to be changed to "St. George" to complement the name of the county, which honored Henry St. George Tucker, Sr., a local judge and U.S. Congressman.

A fire destroyed most of St. George in 1888, and as a result, when the West Virginia Central and Pittsburgh Railway was laid down to Leadsville (now Elkins, West Virginia) it did not go through or near it. This brought about the rise of the new lumber town of Parsons, built on land along the rail line owned by Ward Parsons, who had a civil engineer lay out lots for the town.

In 1888 and '89, Parsons led a drive to petition the county court to hold an election to approve moving the county seat to the town of Parsons. This election took place in 1890, but the change was not approved, failing to receive the necessary 60% majority. Parsons tried again in 1892, but the results were the same. However, the next attempt, in 1893, was successful: after one election which was declared invalid on a legal technicality, a second one received the necessary margin of victory for Parsons.

Some of the leaders of St. George suspected that there were irregularities in the second election, and asked the county court to set aside the results; this request was denied. St. George appealed to the state government, asking for an injunction pending an investigation, but before that could happen, the people of Parsons - annoyed by the attempt to repeal the election results - marched to St. George on August 7, 1893, with the purpose of taking the court's records, thus moving the seat to Parsons by force. Descriptions of the size of the vigilante group vary from 200 armed men to over a thousand, 700 from Parsons and 400 from along the rail line.

A group of citizens from St. George turned out to counter the Parsons contingent, but, fearing the possibility of violence and deaths, the sheriff ordered them to disperse. By the time the group from Parsons arrived, there were few people around to stop them from breaking into the courthouse and stealing the records, as well as the bell from the building's tower. After camping overnight at a nearby farm, they returned to Parsons and established a temporary courthouse in an unopened store building on Main Street. This was used as the Tucker County Court until a new courthouse was built in 1900.

The town of St. George has never regained the prominence it lost by the removal of the county seat. It is now an unincorporated community.

== See also ==
- List of feuds in the United States
- County seat war
- Tucker County Courthouse and Jail - listed on the NRHP
