= Cortland, West Virginia =

Unincorporated community in West Virginia, United States

Cortland
- Unincorporated community
- Location within the state of West Virginia Cortland (the United States)
- Coordinates: 39°4′1″N 79°25′39″W
- Country: United States
- State: West Virginia
- County: Tucker
- Time zone: UTC-5 (Eastern (EST))
  - Summer (DST): UTC-4 (EDT)
- GNIS feature ID: 1550795

Cortland is an unincorporated community in Tucker County, West Virginia, United States. The community lies at the intersection of West Virginia Secondary Routes 35 and 35/18. Cortland was originally known as Cortlands until its post office changed its name to Cortland on March 26, 1888. Cortland once had its own school, Cortland Grade School, in operation there until it was closed in 1933.

== Climate ==
The climate in this area has mild differences between highs and lows, and there is adequate rainfall year-round. According to the Köppen Climate Classification system, Cortland has a marine west coast climate, abbreviated "Cfb" on climate maps.
