= Location, West Virginia =

Location
- Unincorporated community
- Location within the state of West Virginia Location (the United States)
- Coordinates: 39°12′50″N 79°38′13″W
- Country: United States
- State: West Virginia
- County: Tucker
- Elevation: 2,428 ft (740 m)
- Time zone: UTC-5 (Eastern (EST))
  - Summer (DST): UTC-4 (EDT)
- GNIS ID: 1689377

Location is an unincorporated community in Tucker County, West Virginia, United States.
