= Rimel, West Virginia =

- Unincorporated community
- Location within West Virginia Location within the United States
- Coordinates: 38°07′24″N 79°57′05″W
- Country: United States
- State: West Virginia
- County: Pocahontas
- Elevation: 2,454 ft (748 m)
- Time zone: UTC-5 (Eastern (EST))
  - Summer (DST): UTC-4 (EDT)
- Area codes: 304 & 681
- GNIS feature ID: 1552668

Rimel is an unincorporated community in Pocahontas County, West Virginia, United States. Rimel is located on West Virginia Route 92, 10.5 miles (16.9 km) southeast of Marlinton.

The area was originally settled by Alexander W and his wife Isabella Sharp Rider in 1833 where a deed shows Alexander and his brother purchased land in the area.

After his death in 1892 the homeplace was purchased by Mr. Ruben D Rimel who turned the old cabin into what was knowin as the Rimel Post office.

Reuben D. Rimel, an early postmaster, gave the community his name.
