= West Virginia Route 90 =

State highway in West Virginia, United States

West Virginia Route 90

Route information
- Maintained by WVDOH
- Length: 12.9 mi (20.8 km)
- Existed: 1930–present

Major junctions
- South end: US 219 near Thomas
- North end: US 50 in Gormania

Location
- Country: United States
- State: West Virginia
- Counties: Tucker, Grant

Highway system
- West Virginia State Highway System; Interstate; US; State
← WV 88	→ WV 92

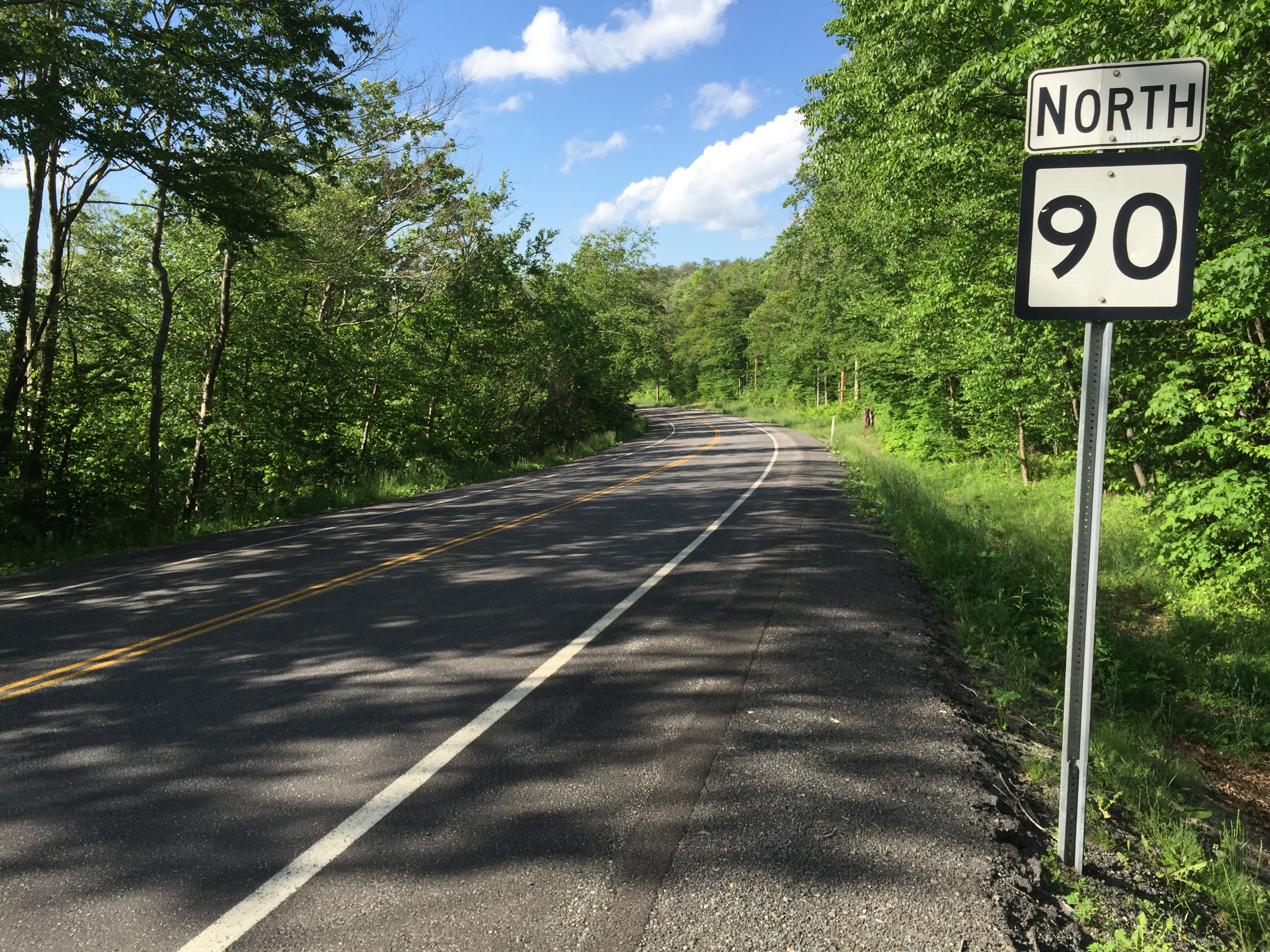
View north along WV 90 in northwestern Grant County

West Virginia Route 90 is a 13-mile (21 km) long north–south state highway in the Eastern Panhandle of West Virginia. The route, located within Tucker County and Grant County, runs parallel to the Maryland state line for most of its length. The southern terminus of the route is at U.S. Route 219 one mile (1.6 km) north of Thomas. The northern terminus is at U.S. Route 50 (the Northwestern Turnpike) in Gormania less than 200 yards (180 m) east of the North Branch Potomac River.

== Major intersections ==
County	Location	mi	km	Destinations	Notes
Tucker				US 219 – Thomas, Oakland, MD	
Grant	Gormania			US 50 – Grafton, Romney	
1.000 mi = 1.609 km; 1.000 km = 0.621 mi
