= Moore, West Virginia =

Moore
- Unincorporated community
- Location within the state of West Virginia Moore (the United States)
- Coordinates: 39°5′3″N 79°43′4″W
- Country: United States
- State: West Virginia
- County: Tucker
- Elevation: 1,811 ft (552 m)
- Time zone: UTC-5 (Eastern (EST))
  - Summer (DST): UTC-4 (EDT)
- GNIS ID: 1552176

Moore is an unincorporated community in Tucker County, West Virginia, United States.
