= Leadmine Run =

Stream in West Virginia, U.S.

Coordinates: 39°12′45″N 79°34′29″W

Leadmine Run is a stream in the U.S. state of West Virginia.

Leadmine Run was so named from an incident when an Indian discovered lead ore near the stream, according to local history.

== See also ==
- List of rivers of West Virginia
