= Tucker County Courthouse and Jail =

- U.S. National Register of Historic Places
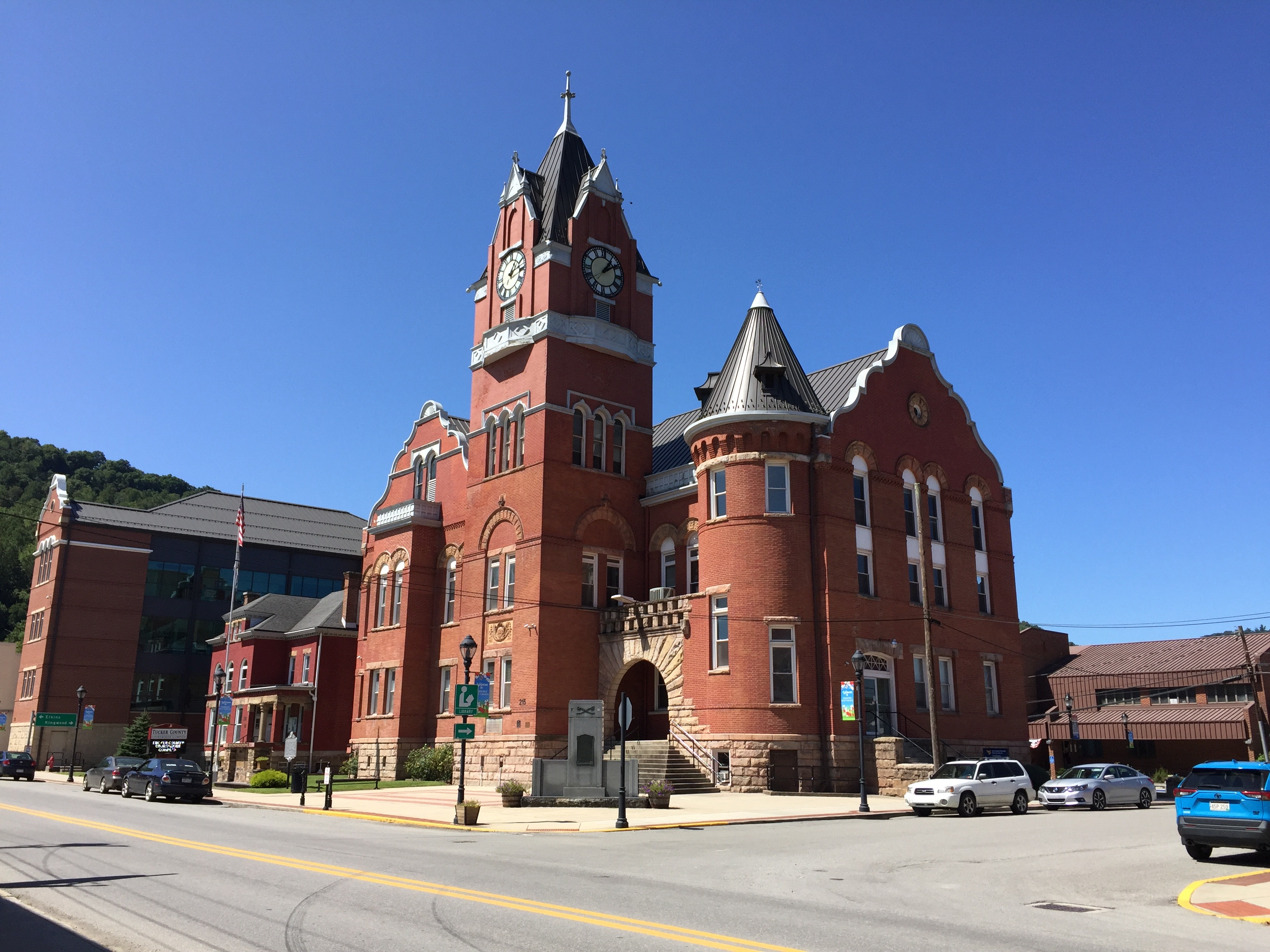
- The courthouse in 2021

- Location within West Virginia Location within the United States
- Interactive map showing the location of Tucker County Courthouse and Jail
- Location: 1st and Walnut Sts., Parsons, West Virginia
- Coordinates: 39°5′49″N 79°40′51″W
- Built: 1898–1900
- Architect: Millburn, Frank P.; Baumgarner, William D.
- Architectural style: Renaissance, Romanesque
- NRHP reference No.: 84003680
- Added to NRHP: August 23, 1984

The Tucker County Courthouse and Jail in Parsons, West Virginia was built between 1898 and 1900 in a combination of Flemish Renaissance and Romanesque Revival styles. The red pressed-brick structure is flanked by a "jail and jailer's residence" built in 1896 in a similar style.

The main courthouse was designed by architect Frank P. Milburn and built by P.O. Shrake. Milburn was a prolific designer of courthouses in West Virginia and across the southern United States. The jail was designed by Franzeim, Geisey and Faris and was built by William D. Bumgarner.

The Tucker County Courthouse was established in the wake of the Tucker County Seat War (1893). The historic jail is no longer used to confine inmates. Since 2005 the Tygart Valley Regional Jail in Randolph County has also served Tucker County.

== Gallery ==
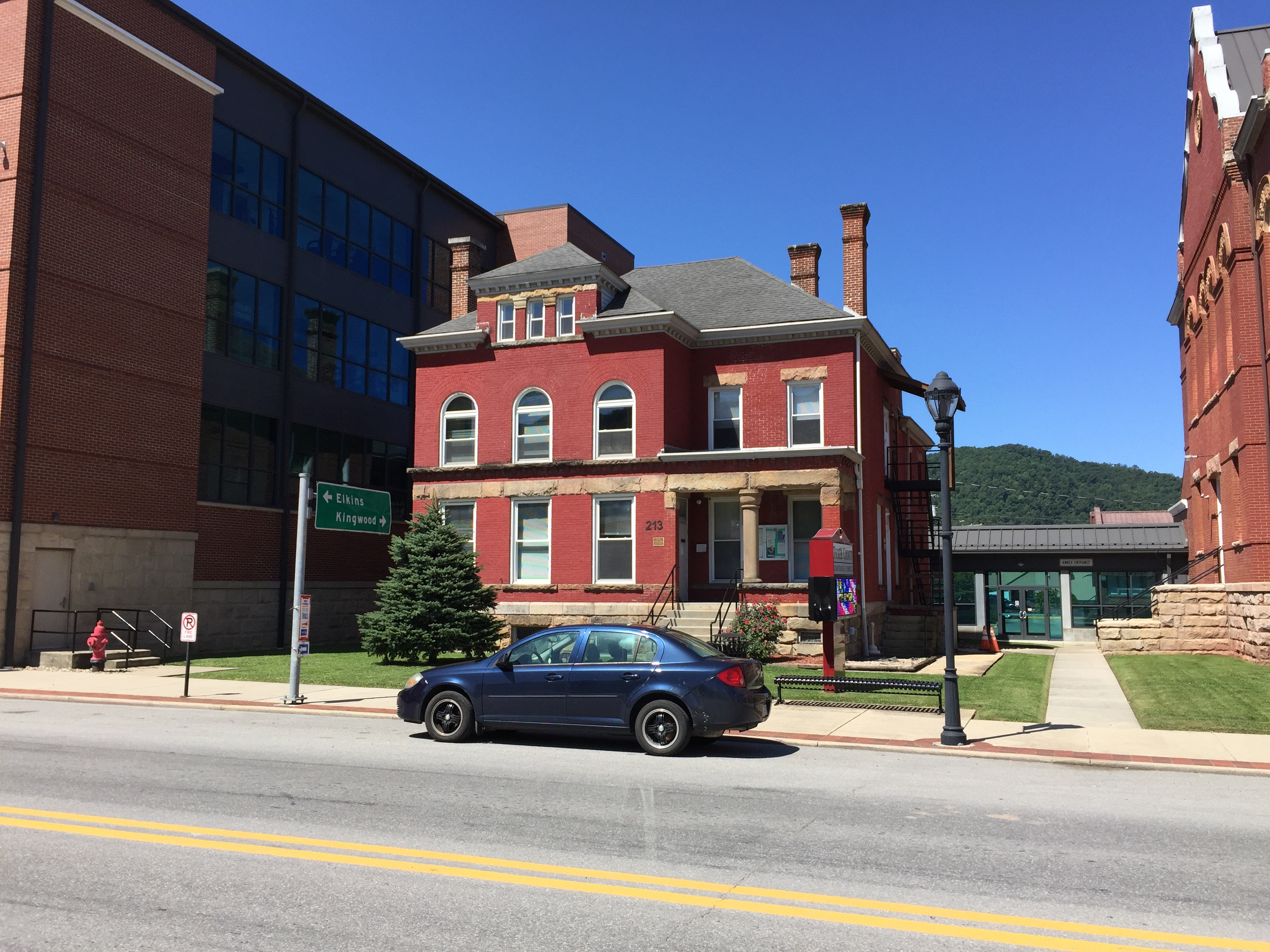
The jail and jailer's residence adjacent to the courthouse in 2021

== See also ==
- National Register of Historic Places listings in Tucker County, West Virginia
