= West Virginia Route 72 =

State highway in West Virginia, United States

West Virginia Route 72

Route information
- Maintained by WVDOH
- Length: 55.7 mi (89.6 km)
- Existed: 1923–present

Major junctions
- South end: WV 32 near Red Creek
- US 219 near Hendricks; US 48 near Parsons; US 50 near Rowlesburg
- North end: WV 7 near Kingwood

Location
- Country: United States
- State: West Virginia
- Counties: Tucker, Preston

Highway system
- West Virginia State Highway System; Interstate; US; State
← WV 71	→ WV 73

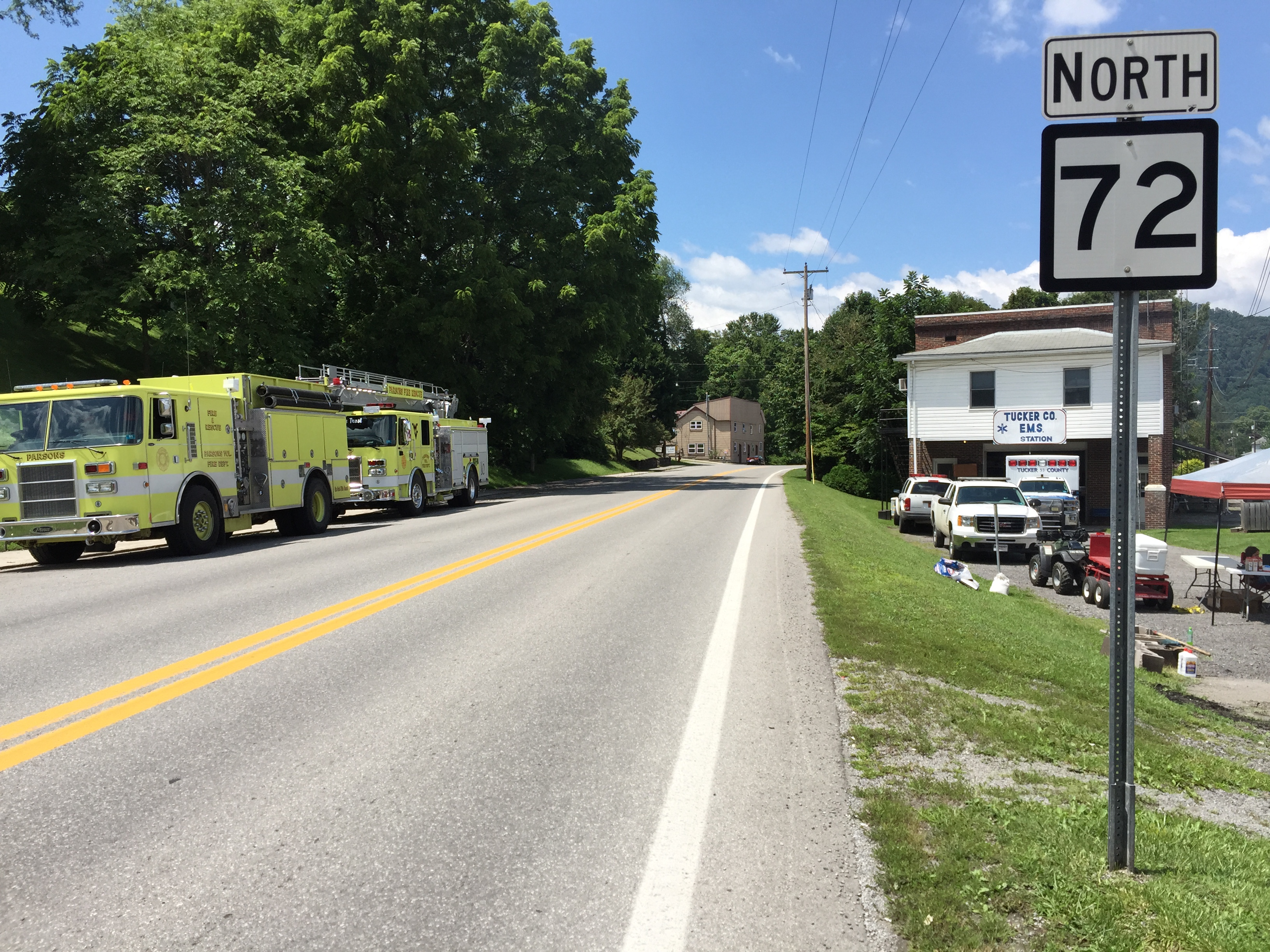
View north along WV 72 in Parsons

West Virginia Route 72 is a north–south state highway in northern West Virginia. The southern terminus of the route is at West Virginia Route 32 southeast of Red Creek. The northern terminus is at West Virginia Route 7 east of Kingwood.

For much of the section between U.S. Route 219 east of Parsons and its southern end at West Virginia Route 32, WV 72 consists of a single paved lane with narrow gravel shoulders. Trucks are prohibited on this stretch by prominently-posted signs.

== Major intersections ==
County	Location	mi	km	Destinations	Notes
Tucker		0.00	0.00	WV 32	Southern terminus
Tucker				US 219 north – Thomas	South end of US 219 overlap
Tucker	Parsons			US 219 south – Elkins	North end of US 219 overlap
Tucker				US 48 – Montrose, Thomas	Interchange
Tucker				WV 38 west – Philippi	
Preston	Macomber			US 50 west – Grafton	South end of US 50 overlap
Preston	Macomber			US 50 east – Romney	North end of US 50 overlap
Preston		55.7	89.6	WV 7 – Kingwood, Terra Alta	Northern terminus
1.000 mi = 1.609 km; 1.000 km = 0.621 mi: Concurrency terminus
