= West Virginia Route 92 =

State highway in West Virginia, United States

West Virginia Route 92

Route information
- Maintained by WVDOH
- Length: 162.3 mi (261.2 km)

Major junctions
- South end: US 60 in White Sulphur Springs
- WV 39 near Minnehaha Springs; WV 28 from Dunmore to Bartow; US 250 from Bartow to Elkins; US 219 from Huttonsville to Elkins; US 33 near Elkins; US 250 from Aggregates to Belington; US 50 near Newburg
- North end: WV 7 in Reedsville

Location
- Country: United States
- State: West Virginia
- Counties: Greenbrier, Pocahontas, Randolph, Barbour, Preston

Highway system
- West Virginia State Highway System; Interstate; US; State
← WV 90	→ WV 93

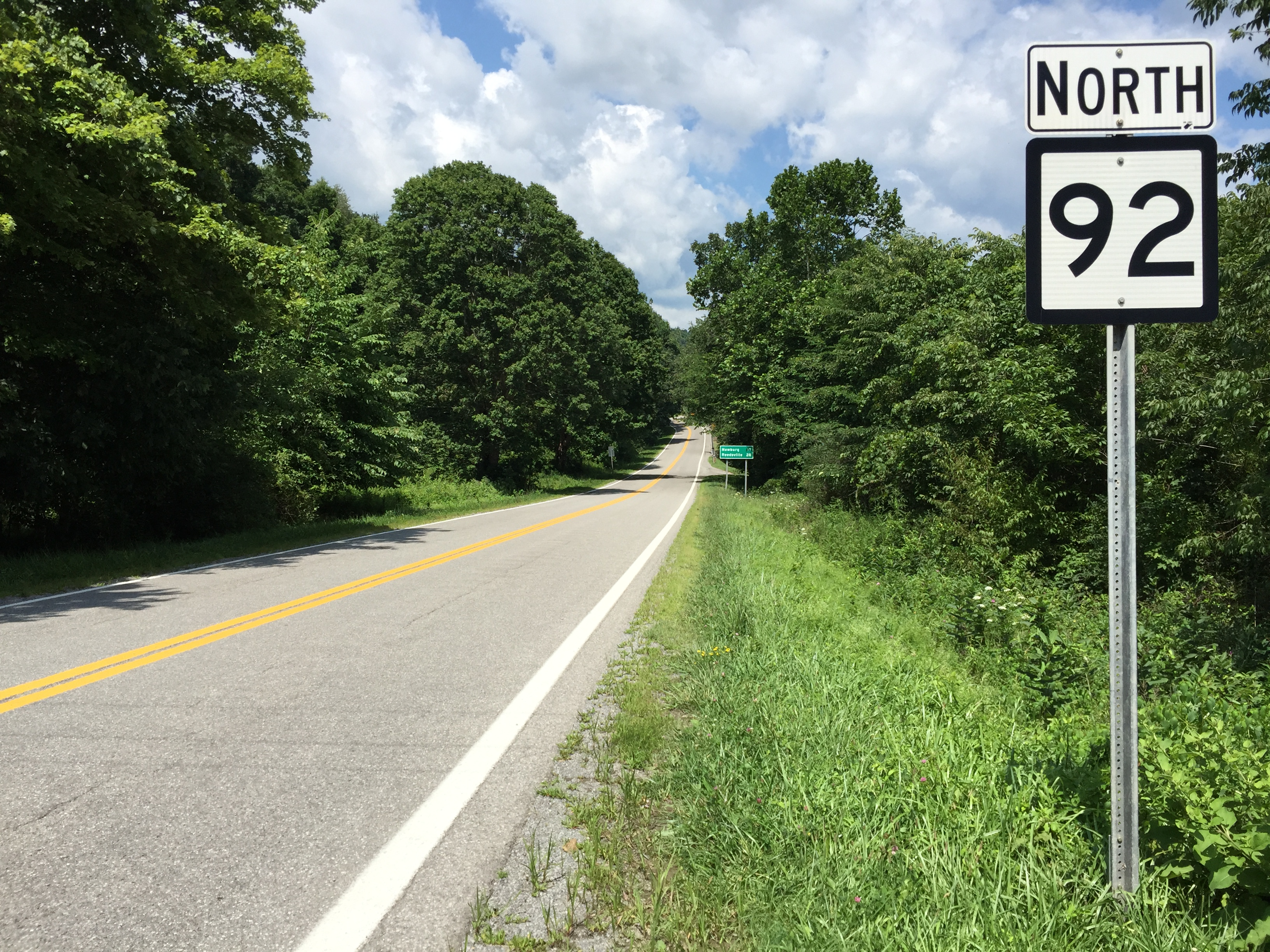
View north along WV 92 at WV 38 in Nestorville

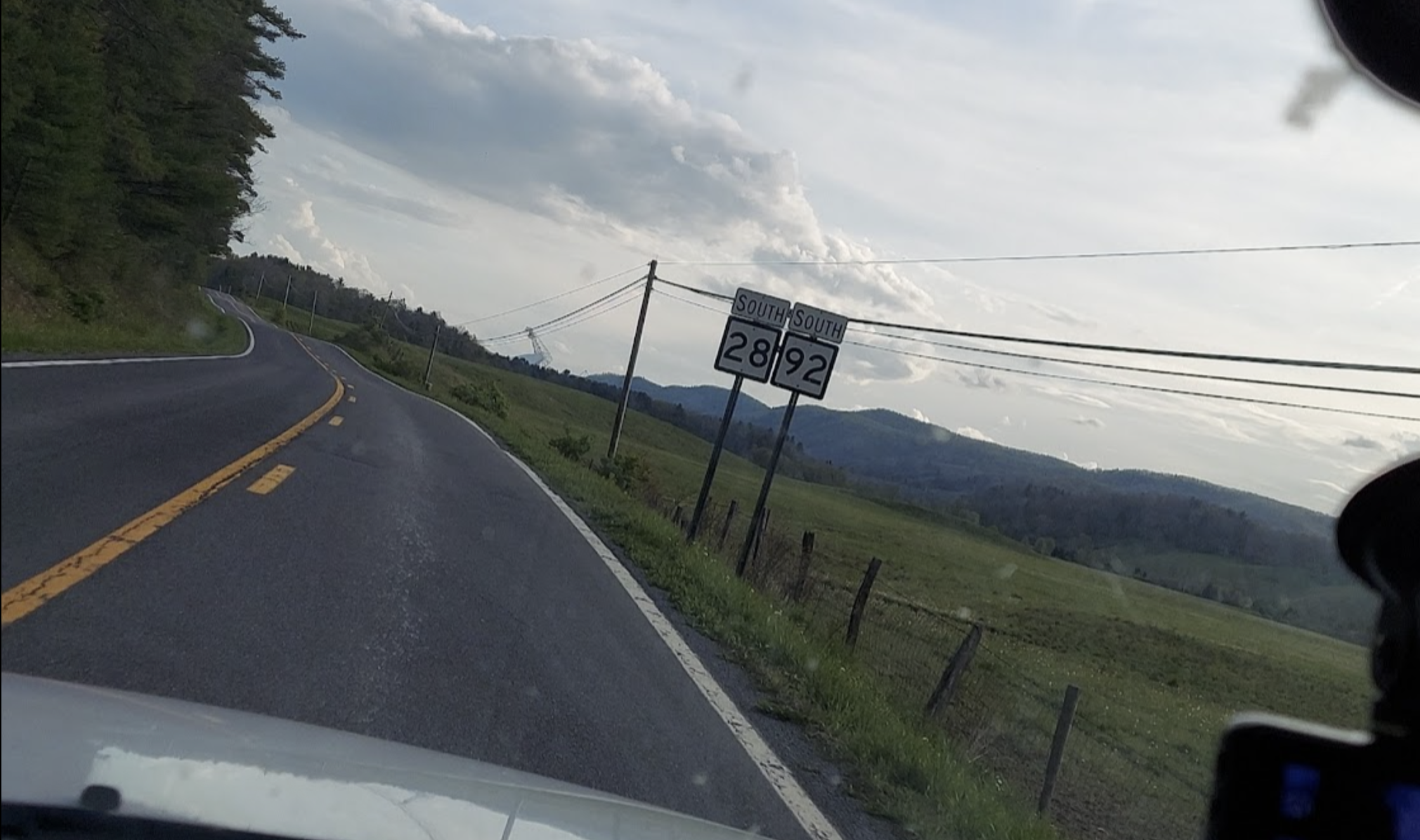
Route 92 outside of Arbovale, with the Green Bank Telescope visible

West Virginia Route 92 is a north–south state highway located in West Virginia, US. The southern terminus of the route is at U.S. Route 60 in White Sulphur Springs a half-mile northwest of Interstate 64 exit 181. The northern terminus is at West Virginia Route 7 in Reedsville.

== Major intersections ==
County	Location	mi	km	Destinations	Notes
Greenbrier	White Sulphur Springs			US 60 to I-64 – Covington, VA, Lewisburg	
Pocahontas	Rimel			WV 39 east – Warm Springs, VA	south end of WV 39 overlap
Pocahontas	Minnehaha Springs			WV 39 west – Marlinton	north end of WV 39 overlap
Pocahontas	Frost			WV 84 east – Vanderpool, VA	
Pocahontas	Dunmore			WV 28 south – Marlinton	south end of WV 28 overlap
Pocahontas				WV 66 west – Cass, Snowshoe	
Pocahontas	Bartow			US 250 north / WV 28 north – Seneca Rocks, Monterey, VA	north end of WV 28 overlap; south end of US 250 overlap
see US 250
Randolph	Elkins			US 33 west / US 219 north / US 250 north to I-79 / Railroad Avenue	north end of US 33 / US 219 / US 250 overlap
Randolph	Aggregates			US 33 east / US 250 south to US 219 – Parsons	south end of US 33 / US 250 overlap
see US 250
Barbour	Belington			US 250 north – Philippi	north end of US 250 overlap
Barbour				WV 38 west – Philippi	south end of WV 38 overlap
Barbour	Nestorville			WV 38 east – Parsons	north end of WV 38 overlap
Preston				US 50 east – Romney, Keyser	south end of US 50 overlap
Preston				US 50 west – Grafton, Tygart Lake State Park	north end of US 50 overlap
Preston	Reedsville			WV 7 – Morgantown, Kingwood	
1.000 mi = 1.609 km; 1.000 km = 0.621 mi
