= Nestorville, West Virginia =

Nestorville
- Unincorporated community
- Location within the state of West Virginia Nestorville (the United States)
- Coordinates: 39°10′47″N 79°54′33″W
- Country: United States
- State: West Virginia
- County: Barbour
- Elevation: 1,375 ft (419 m)
- Time zone: UTC-5 (Eastern (EST))
  - Summer (DST): UTC-4 (EDT)
- GNIS ID: 1555200

Nestorville is an unincorporated community in Barbour County, West Virginia, United States.
