= Vanderpool, Virginia =

Unincorporated community in Virginia, United States

- Unincorporated community
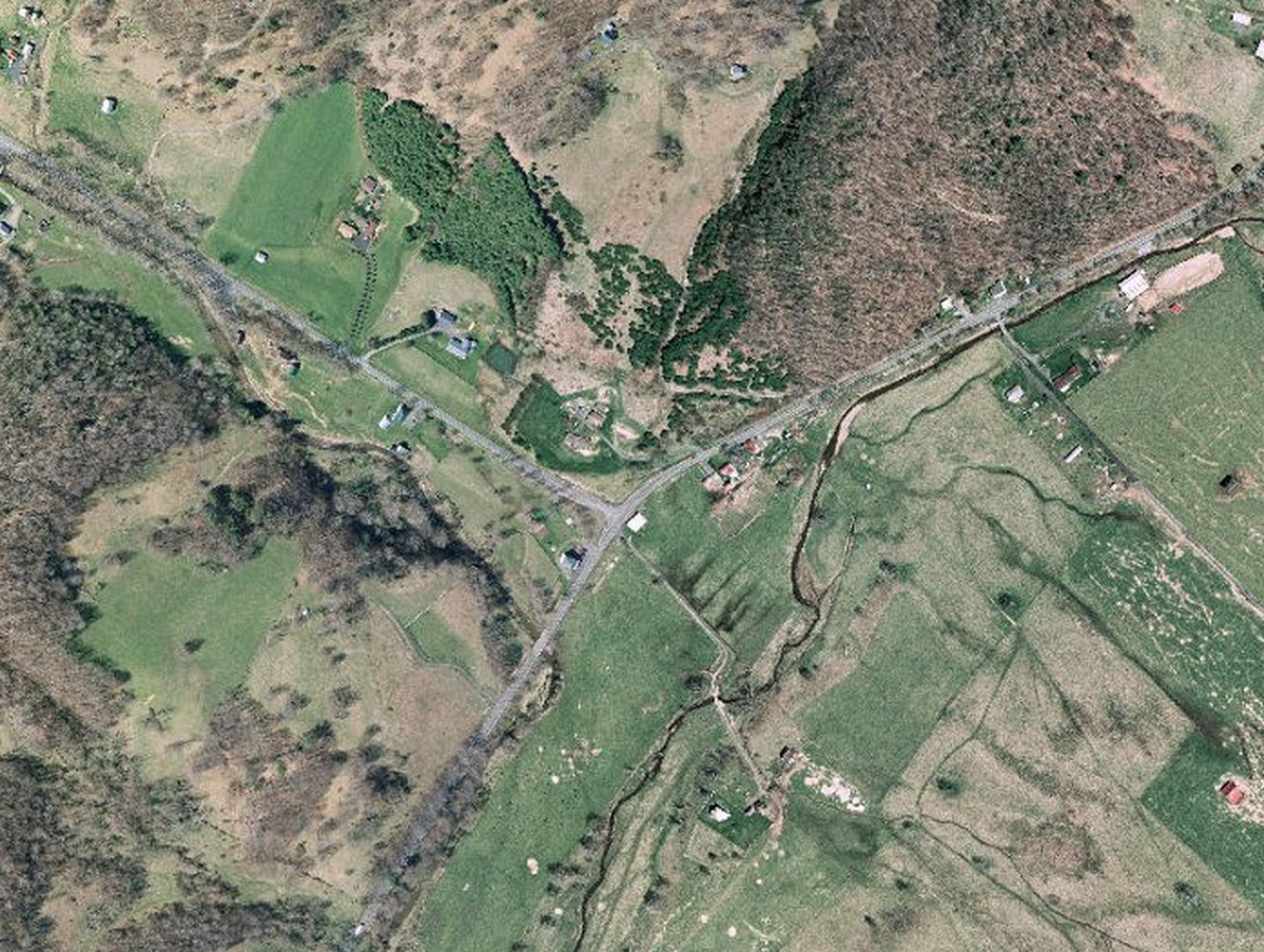
- Aerial view of Vanderpool, Virginia

- Location within Virginia Location within the United States
- Coordinates: 38°22′10″N 79°37′31″W
- Country: United States
- State: Virginia
- County: Highland
- Elevation: 2,608 ft (795 m)
- Time zone: UTC−5 (Eastern (EST))
  - Summer (DST): UTC−4 (EDT)
- ZIP code: 24465
- Area code: 540
- GNIS feature ID: 1497187

Vanderpool (also Galltown, Gaul Town, or Woodsborough) is an unincorporated community in Highland County, Virginia, United States. Vanderpool is located 3.8 miles (6.1 km) south-southwest of Monterey at the junction of Virginia State Route 84 and U.S. Route 220. The community is situated near Vanderpool Gap, through which the Jackson River flows. Before the creation of Highland County in 1847, Vanderpool was proposed to be the new county's seat, though it was defeated in favor of Monterey. Vanderpool was named after the Dutch explorer John Vanderpool, who was the first man to pass through the area on horseback and discovered the Vanderpool Gap.
