= St. George, West Virginia =

St. George
- Unincorporated community
- Location within the state of West Virginia St. George (the United States)
- Coordinates: 39°10′000″N 79°42′08″W
- Country: United States
- State: West Virginia
- County: Tucker
- Elevation: 1,562 ft (476 m)

Population (2020)
  - Total: 74
- Time zone: UTC-5 (Eastern (EST))
  - Summer (DST): UTC-4 (EDT)
- ZIP codes: 26290-Past 26287-Current
- GNIS feature ID: 1552767

St. George is an unincorporated community and former county seat of Tucker County, West Virginia, United States. As a census-designated place, the population was 74 at the 2020 census.

It is located on the Cheat River, where it is joined by Minear Run.

== History ==
Originally known as Fort Minear and then as Westernford, St. George was settled in 1774 by German immigrant John Minear and his son, Jonathan, after early scouting visits to the area.

In 1856, an act creating the county specified that Tucker's county court was to be held on the lands of Enoch Minear, descendant of Jonathan Minear. The town was then renamed Saint George in honor of Henry St. George Tucker, Jr. (1828–63), the son of the county's namesake, Henry St. George Tucker, Sr. (1780–1848).

The Skirmish at Bowman's Place occurred nearby in June 1861.

During the Tucker County Seat War, on the evening of August 1, 1893, vigilantes from Parsons seeking to move the county seat broke into the courthouse and stole the county records and the courthouse bell, moving the government of Tucker County to Parsons, where it has remained to this day.

The St. George Academy was listed on the National Register of Historic Places in 2001.

== Notable people ==
- William Ewin (1808 – 1886), lawyer and State Senator
- Hu Maxwell, local historian born in St. George
