= Tucker County, West Virginia =

County in West Virginia, United States

Tucker County
- County
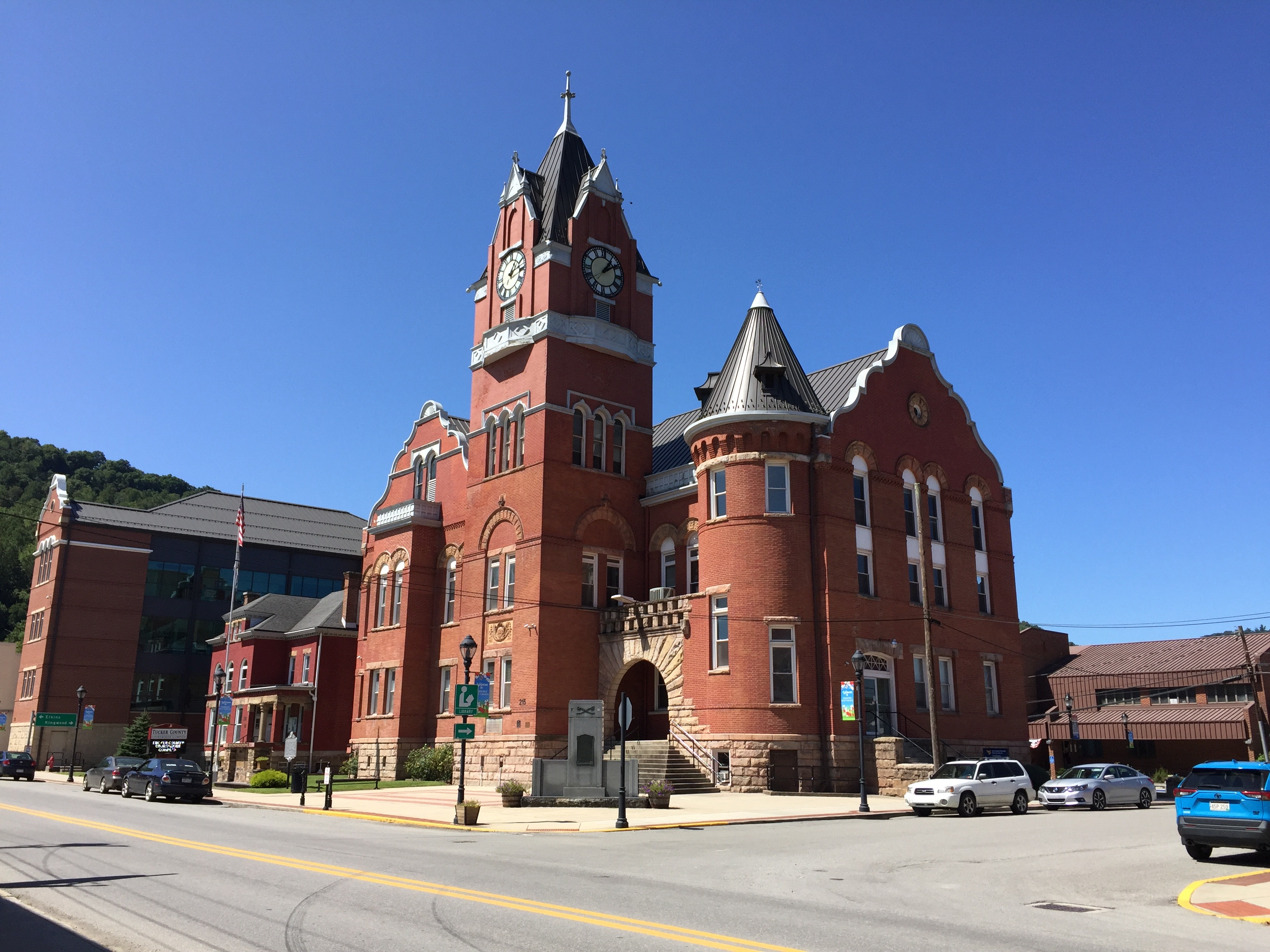
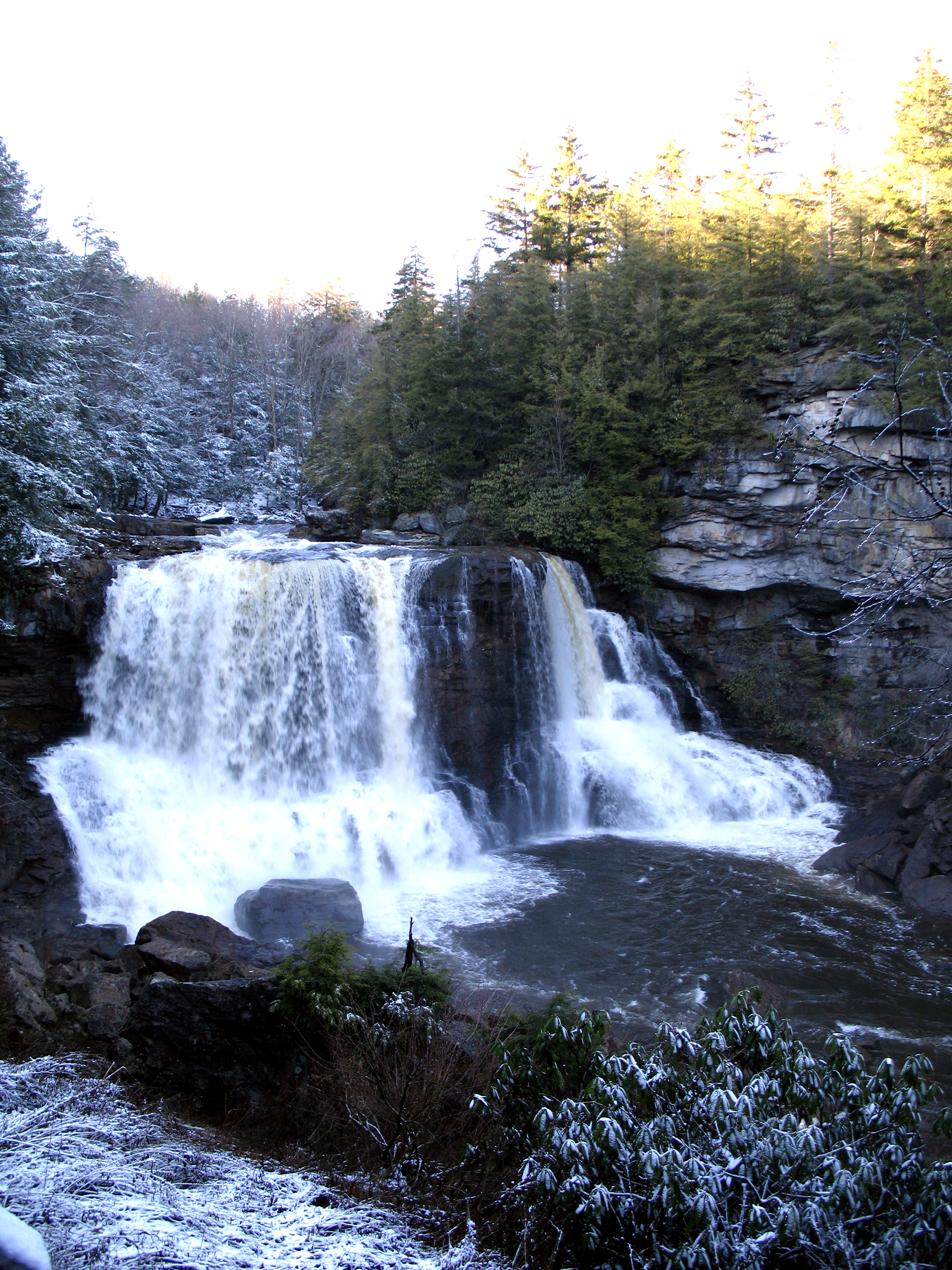
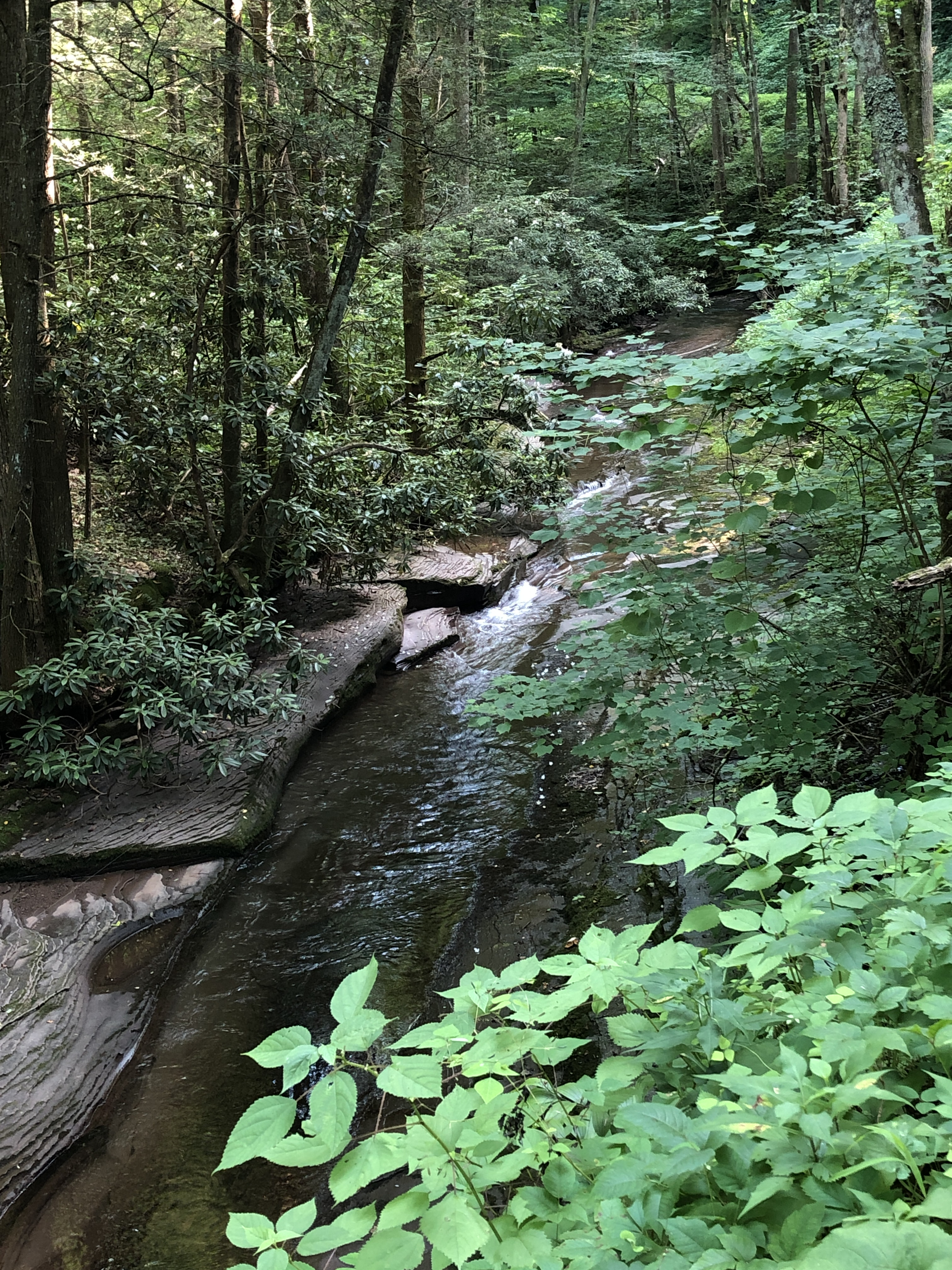
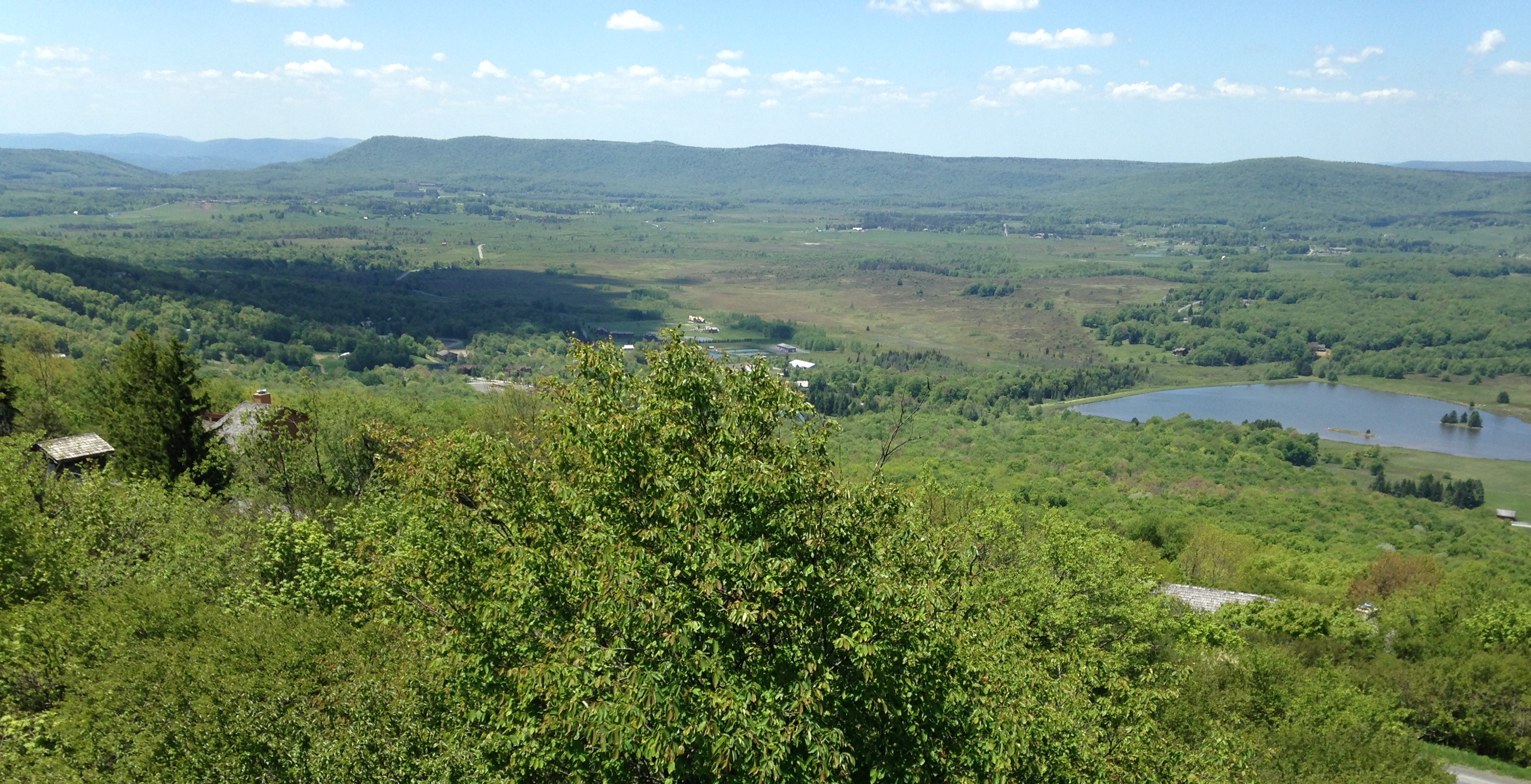
- Tucker County Courthouse in Parsons Blackwater Falls State Park Fernow Experimental Forest Canaan Valley

- Seal

- Location of Tucker County in West Virginia

- West Virginia's location within the U.S.
- Coordinates: 39.09°N 79.34°W
- Country: United States
- State: West Virginia
- Founded: March 7, 1856
- Named for: Henry St. George Tucker, Sr.
- Seat: Parsons
- and largest city

Government
  - Commission President: Michael Rosenau (D)
  - County Commission: Fred Davis; Tim Knotts (R)

Area
  - Total: 421 sq mi (1,090 km^{2})
  - Land: 419 sq mi (1,090 km^{2})
  - Water: 2.1 sq mi (5.4 km^{2}) 0.5%
  - Rank: 28th

Population (2020)
  - Total: 6,762
  - Estimate (2025): 6,540 ▼
  - Rank: 52nd
  - Density: 16.1/sq mi (6.23/km^{2})
- Time zone: UTC−5 (Eastern)
  - Summer (DST): UTC−4 (EDT)
- Area codes: 304, 681
- Congressional district: 2nd
- Senate district: 14th
- House of Delegates district: 85th
- Website: https://tuckercountycommission.com/

Tucker County is a county in the U.S. state of West Virginia. As of the 2020 census, the population was 6,762, making it West Virginia's fourth-least populous county. Its county seat is Parsons. The county was created in 1856 from a part of Randolph County, then part of Virginia. In 1871, a small part of Barbour County, was transferred to Tucker County. The county was named after Henry St. George Tucker, Sr., a judge and Congressman from Williamsburg, Virginia.

== History ==
Tucker County was created in 1856 from a part of Randolph County, then part of Virginia. In 1861, as a result of the Wheeling Convention, Tucker County joined the rest of West Virginia in breaking away from Virginia to remain a part of the Union.

In 1863, West Virginia's counties were divided into civil townships, with the intention of encouraging local government. This proved impractical in the heavily rural state, and in 1872 the townships were converted into magisterial districts. Tucker County was initially divided into three townships: Black Fork, Hannahsville, and St. George, which became magisterial districts in 1872. The following year, Hannahsville became Licking District, and in 1876, two new magisterial districts were formed: Clover from part of St. George, and Dry Fork from part of Black Fork. A sixth district, Fairfax, was organized in the 1880s, followed by a seventh, Davis, formed in the 1890s from parts of Dry Fork and Fairfax Districts.

Between 1889 and '93, a dispute known as the Tucker County Seat War took place between the people in the town of Parsons and that of St. George, over the location of the county seat. Although nobody was killed in the "war", the situation came to a climax when a mob of armed men from Parsons marched on St. George and took the county records by force.

Beginning in 1907, the Babcock Lumber Company of Pittsburgh, Pennsylvania, while operating out of Davis, West Virginia, clear cut the mountain ridges throughout Tucker Country. This clear cutting, with its residual slashings, converted the landscape into a "tinderbox". By 1910, fires burned continuously — in some areas for years on end, from spring until the first snows — leaving little other than thin mineral soil and bare rock. In 1914, with the county virtually denuded of standing trees, the ground burned continually for 6 months. As a result, top soils that once produced huge timbers on the mountainsides — including the largest tree ever harvested in West Virginia, a white oak some 13 feet in diameter just 10 feet from the ground — washed down into the narrow valleys and bottom lands, which had always been too narrow for harvesting productive crops or livestock. Uncontrollable soil erosion and flooding further degraded and depopulated the region. To this day, Tucker County and surrounding regions bear the scars of this remarkable conflagration.

== Geography ==
According to the United States Census Bureau, the county has a total area of 421 square miles (1,090 km^{2}), of which 419 square miles (1,090 km^{2}) is land and 2.1 square miles (5.4 km^{2}) (0.5%) is water.

=== Major highways ===
- U.S. Highway 219
- West Virginia Route 32
- West Virginia Route 38
- West Virginia Route 72
- West Virginia Route 90
- West Virginia Route 93

U.S. 48

=== Adjacent counties ===
- Preston County (north)
- Grant County (east)
- Randolph County (south)
- Barbour County (west)

=== State parks ===
- Blackwater Falls State Park
- Canaan Valley Resort State Park
- Fairfax Stone State Park

=== Federal lands ===
- Canaan Valley National Wildlife Refuge
- Dolly Sods Wilderness
- Fernow Experimental Forest
- Monongahela National Forest

=== National Natural Landmarks ===
- Big Run Bog
- Canaan Valley
- Fisher Spring Run Bog

== Demographics ==
Historical population
Census	Pop.	Note	%±
1860	1,428		—
1870	1,907		33.5%
1880	3,151		65.2%
1890	6,459		105.0%
1900	13,433		108.0%
1910	18,675		39.0%
1920	16,791		−10.1%
1930	13,374		−20.4%
1940	13,173		−1.5%
1950	10,600		−19.5%
1960	7,750		−26.9%
1970	7,447		−3.9%
1980	8,675		16.5%
1990	7,728		−10.9%
2000	7,231		−6.4%
2010	7,141		−1.2%
2020	6,762		−5.3%
2025 (est.)	6,540	▼	−3.3%
U.S. Decennial Census; 1790–1960 1900–1990; 1990–2000 2010–2020

=== 2020 census ===
As of the 2020 census, the county had a population of 6,762. Of the residents, 18.8% were under the age of 18 and 26.4% were 65 years of age or older; the median age was 49.7 years. For every 100 females there were 100.7 males, and for every 100 females age 18 and over there were 99.5 males.

The racial makeup of the county was 95.5% White, 0.3% Black or African American, 0.1% American Indian and Alaska Native, 0.1% Asian, 0.3% from some other race, and 3.7% from two or more races. Hispanic or Latino residents of any race comprised 0.8% of the population.

There were 2,993 households in the county, of which 24.8% had children under the age of 18 living with them and 23.3% had a female householder with no spouse or partner present. About 31.7% of all households were made up of individuals and 16.7% had someone living alone who was 65 years of age or older.

There were 4,650 housing units, of which 35.6% were vacant. Among occupied housing units, 79.1% were owner-occupied and 20.9% were renter-occupied. The homeowner vacancy rate was 1.4% and the rental vacancy rate was 12.0%.

Tucker County, West Virginia – Racial and ethnic composition Note: the US Census treats Hispanic/Latino as an ethnic category. This table excludes Latinos from the racial categories and assigns them to a separate category. Hispanics/Latinos may be of any race.
Race / Ethnicity (NH = Non-Hispanic)	Pop 2000	Pop 2010	Pop 2020	% 2000	% 2010	% 2020
White alone (NH)	7,224	7,024	6,432	98.68%	98.36%	95.12%
Black or African American alone (NH)	4	11	20	0.05%	0.15%	0.30%
Native American or Alaska Native alone (NH)	14	11	4	0.19%	0.15%	0.06%
Asian alone (NH)	1	8	6	0.01%	0.11%	0.09%
Pacific Islander alone (NH)	9	1	1	0.12%	0.01%	0.01%
Other race alone (NH)	3	3	10	0.04%	0.04%	0.15%
Mixed race or Multiracial (NH)	48	42	233	0.66%	0.59%	3.45%
Hispanic or Latino (any race)	18	41	56	0.25%	0.57%	0.83%
Total	7,321	7,141	6,762	100.00%	100.00%	100.00%

=== 2010 census ===
As of the 2010 United States census, there were 7,141 people, 3,057 households, and 2,052 families living in the county. The population density was 17.0 inhabitants per square mile (6.6/km^{2}). There were 5,346 housing units at an average density of 12.8 units per square mile (4.9 units/km^{2}). The racial makeup of the county was 98.7% white, 0.2% American Indian, 0.2% black or African American, 0.1% Asian, 0.1% from other races, and 0.6% from two or more races. Those of Hispanic or Latino origin made up 0.6% of the population. In terms of ancestry, 30.3% were German, 15.7% were Irish, 8.1% were American, 7.9% were English, and 5.8% were Dutch.

Of the 3,057 households, 25.3% had children under the age of 18 living with them, 55.1% were married couples living together, 7.5% had a female householder with no husband present, 32.9% were non-families, and 28.3% of all households were made up of individuals. The average household size was 2.29 and the average family size was 2.77. The median age was 46.3 years.

The median income for a household in the county was $32,712 and the median income for a family was $43,307. Males had a median income of $34,321 versus $22,938 for females. The per capita income for the county was $20,020. About 12.9% of families and 17.7% of the population were below the poverty line, including 20.3% of those under age 18 and 20.7% of those age 65 or over.

=== 2000 census ===
As of the census of 2000, there were 7,321 people, 3,052 households, and 2,121 families living in the county. The population density was 18 people per square mile (6.9 people/km^{2}). There were 4,634 housing units at an average density of 11 units per square mile (4.2 units/km^{2}). The racial makeup of the county was 98.85% White, 0.07% Black or African American, 0.19% Native American, 0.01% Asian, 0.12% Pacific Islander, 0.10% from other races, and 0.66% from two or more races. 0.25% of the population were Hispanic or Latino of any race.

There were 3,052 households, out of which 27.00% had children under the age of 18 living with them, 58.00% were married couples living together, 7.80% had a female householder with no husband present, and 30.50% were non-families. 27.20% of all households were made up of individuals, and 13.60% had someone living alone who was 65 years of age or older. The average household size was 2.35 and the average family size was 2.84.

In the county, the population was spread out, with 21.30% under the age of 18, 6.70% from 18 to 24, 26.40% from 25 to 44, 27.70% from 45 to 64, and 17.90% who were 65 years of age or older. The median age was 42 years. For every 100 females there were 95.20 males. For every 100 females age 18 and over, there were 94.10 males.

The median income for a household in the county was $26,250, and the median income for a family was $32,574. Males had a median income of $24,149 versus $17,642 for females. The per capita income for the county was $16,349. About 14.90% of families and 18.10% of the population were below the poverty line, including 24.30% of those under age 18 and 15.50% of those age 65 or over.

== Politics and government ==
=== Federal Politics ===
Tucker County lies within West Virginia's 2nd congressional district. The current representative of the district is Riley Moore (R).

Tucker County was divided at the time of the Virginia Secession Convention, and has been a consistent statewide bellwether, voting for the winner of West Virginia's electoral votes in every presidential election since the state's formation, except that of 1912, when it voted for Theodore Roosevelt.

Voter Registration and Party Enrollment of Tucker County
Party	Total	Percentage
Democratic	1,578	31.22%
Republican	1,777	35.15%
Independents, unaffiliated, and other	1,700	33.15%
Total	5,055	100.00%

United States presidential election results for Tucker County, West Virginia
Year	Republican		Democratic		Third party(ies)	
Year	No.	%	No.	%	No.	%
1912	548	16.67%	1,221	37.15%	1,518	46.18%
1916	1,531	49.76%	1,388	45.11%	158	5.13%
1920	2,498	53.34%	1,961	41.87%	224	4.78%
1924	2,277	45.61%	2,127	42.61%	588	11.78%
1928	2,525	51.83%	2,263	46.45%	84	1.72%
1932	2,204	39.71%	3,244	58.45%	102	1.84%
1936	2,335	37.85%	3,801	61.61%	33	0.53%
1940	2,654	44.34%	3,332	55.66%	0	0.00%
1944	2,220	45.37%	2,673	54.63%	0	0.00%
1948	2,102	44.79%	2,557	54.49%	34	0.72%
1952	2,235	46.45%	2,577	53.55%	0	0.00%
1956	2,326	52.21%	2,129	47.79%	0	0.00%
1960	1,887	47.45%	2,090	52.55%	0	0.00%
1964	1,314	33.03%	2,664	66.97%	0	0.00%
1968	1,511	41.96%	1,758	48.82%	332	9.22%
1972	2,163	59.75%	1,457	40.25%	0	0.00%
1976	1,396	37.54%	2,323	62.46%	0	0.00%
1980	1,798	46.64%	1,862	48.30%	195	5.06%
1984	2,240	55.80%	1,766	44.00%	8	0.20%
1988	1,699	47.50%	1,869	52.25%	9	0.25%
1992	1,261	34.79%	1,805	49.79%	559	15.42%
1996	1,217	36.75%	1,649	49.79%	446	13.47%
2000	1,935	57.83%	1,319	39.42%	92	2.75%
2004	2,179	60.53%	1,400	38.89%	21	0.58%
2008	2,123	60.54%	1,288	36.73%	96	2.74%
2012	2,176	69.34%	880	28.04%	82	2.61%
2016	2,565	73.26%	751	21.45%	185	5.28%
2020	2,841	73.89%	938	24.40%	66	1.72%
2024	2,669	73.40%	890	24.48%	77	2.12%

=== State Politics ===
Tucker County is represented by two Senators in the West Virginia Senate. Senate members Jay Taylor (R), and Randy Smith (R) both serve in West Virginia's 14th Senate district. The county is represented in the West Virginia House of Delegates by one Delegate. The Delegate for Tucker County is John Paul Hott (R) for district 85

=== County government ===
Tucker County is governed by a County Commission. The commission is made up of the Commission President and Commissioners whom wield administrative powers of the county's government. Michael Rosenau (D) is the current President of the County Commission.

The Tucker County Commission consists of two members. The current members of the County Commission are Fred Davis and Tim Knotts (R).

== Communities ==
=== Cities ===
- Parsons (county seat)
- Thomas

=== Towns ===
- Davis
- Hambleton
- Hendricks

=== Magisterial districts ===
- Black Fork
- Clover
- Davis
- Dry Fork
- Fairfax
- Licking
- St. George

=== Census-designated place ===
- St. George

=== Unincorporated communities ===
- Auvil
- Benbush
- Bretz
- Canaan Heights
- Coketon
- Cortland
- Douglas
- Dryfork
- Elk
- Gladwin
- Hannahsville
- Hovatter
- Jenningston
- Laneville
- Lead Mine
- Location
- Mackeyville
- Moore
- Pierce
- Pleasant Run
- Pleasant Vale
- Porterwood
- Red Creek
- Shafer
- William

== Notable residents ==
- Tony Tonelli, football player. Shunned by the West Virginia University football program because of his Italian heritage, Tonelli was a star lineman (two-way guard, earning three letters) for the USC Trojans, one of the top programs in the country. In his final season Tonelli blocked a punt deep in Duke territory that led to the winning touchdown in the 1939 Rose Bowl. Drafted into the NfL by Detroit in 1939, Tonelli completed one season for the Lions. He earned his nickname, "Two Ton" Tonelli, while growing up in Thomas, West Virginia.

== Education ==
The school district is Tucker County Schools.

== See also ==
- National Register of Historic Places listings in Tucker County, West Virginia
- Tucker County Seat War
