= Thomas, West Virginia =

City in West Virginia, US

- City
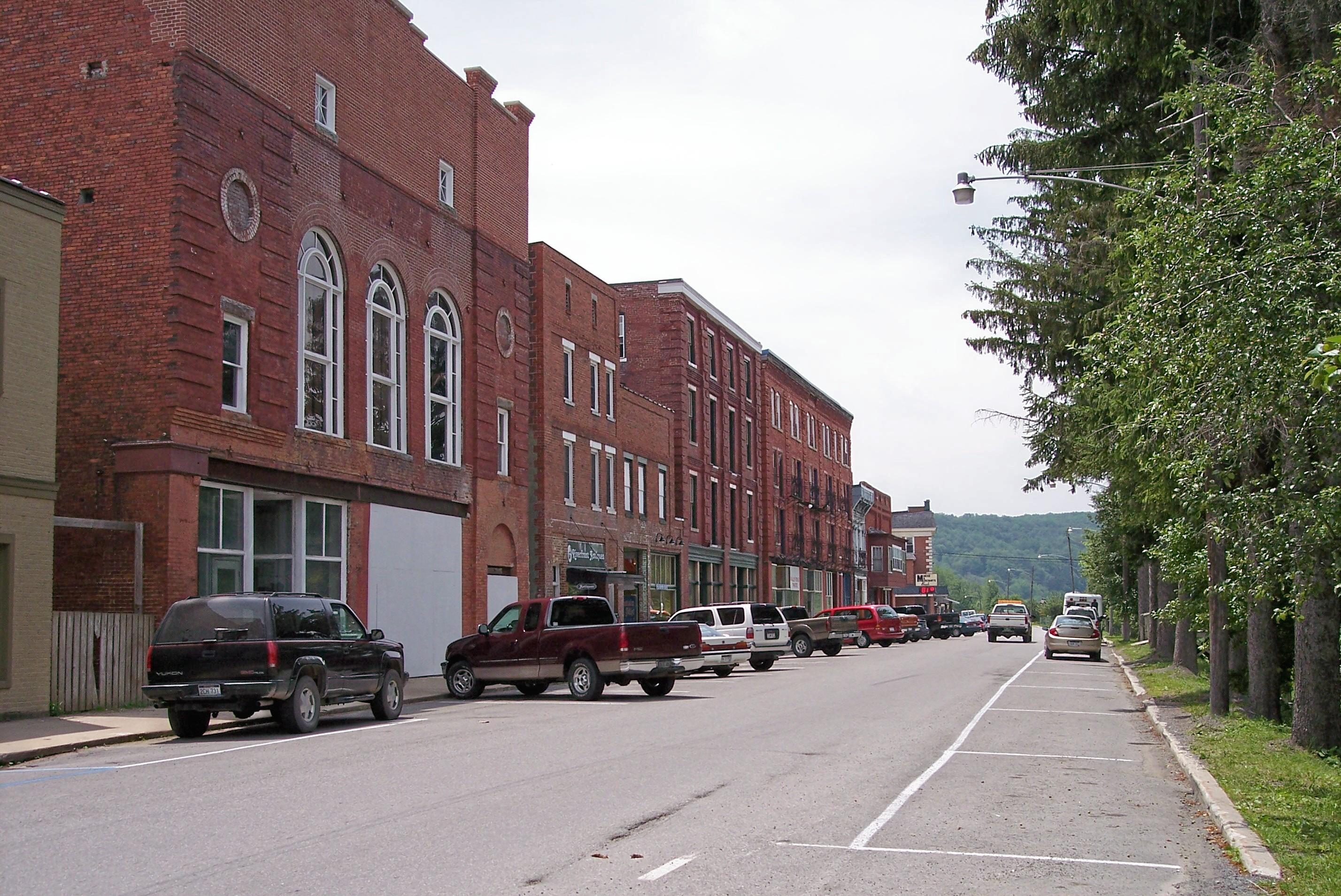
- East Avenue in Thomas in 2006

- Location of Thomas in Tucker County, West Virginia.
- Coordinates: 39°8′53″N 79°29′50″W
- Country: United States
- State: West Virginia
- County: Tucker
- Platted: 1884
- Chartered: 1892
- Incorporated: April 17, 1925

Area
  - Total: 4.51 sq mi (11.67 km^{2})
  - Land: 4.46 sq mi (11.55 km^{2})
  - Water: 0.046 sq mi (0.12 km^{2})
- Elevation: 3,035 ft (925 m)

Population (2020)
  - Total: 611
  - Estimate (2021): 614
  - Density: 123.3/sq mi (47.61/km^{2})
- Time zone: UTC-5 (Eastern (EST))
  - Summer (DST): UTC-4 (EDT)
- ZIP code: 26292
- Area code: 304
- FIPS code: 54-80020
- GNIS feature ID: 1555802
- Website: local.wv.gov/thomas/Pages/default.aspx

Thomas is a city and former coal town in Tucker County, West Virginia, United States. The population was 623 at the 2020 census.

== History ==
Thomas was platted in 1884. Thomas was named for Thomas Beall Davis (1828-1911), brother of Senator Henry Gassaway Davis. The Davis brothers, in 1883, opened a mine near Thomas and had coal ready to ship when their railway arrived a year later. By 1892, Davis Coal and Coke was among the largest and best known coal companies in the world and employed 1,600 people. At the peak of its operations in 1915, there were nine producing mines within a mile of the company's office in Thomas.

Immigrants flocked to the area as miners, railroad laborers, or merchants. The company employed a man named Wladyslaw Dackiewicz as an interpreter. He could speak, read, and write eight languages and his services were much in demand with the influx of immigrants.

In 1901, in less than two hours, nearly half of Thomas (83 buildings) was destroyed by a fire. The city was quickly rebuilt with fine hotels and a new opera house. The Cottrill Opera House had a saloon on the first floor which was by far the most elegant of the eight bars located on Front Street. In 1909, Front Street (also known as First Street, Main Street, and East Avenue) was laid with brick to become the first paved street in the county.

Thomas claimed to have the grandest railway station between Cumberland, Maryland, and Elkins, West Virginia. Built of brick in 1901, it was destroyed by a tornado in 1944.

In 1921, coke production ceased and mining operations slowed.

The Potomac Valley Transit Authority started operations to Thomas effective January 29, 2026.

The Cottrill Opera House, Davis Coal and Coke Company Administrative Building, Fairfax Stone, and Thomas Commercial Historic District are listed on the National Register of Historic Places.

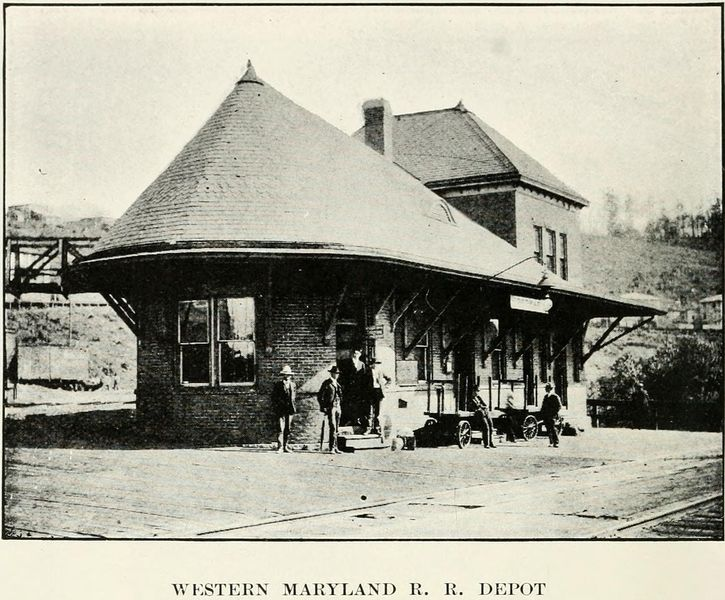
Western Maryland Railroad Depot

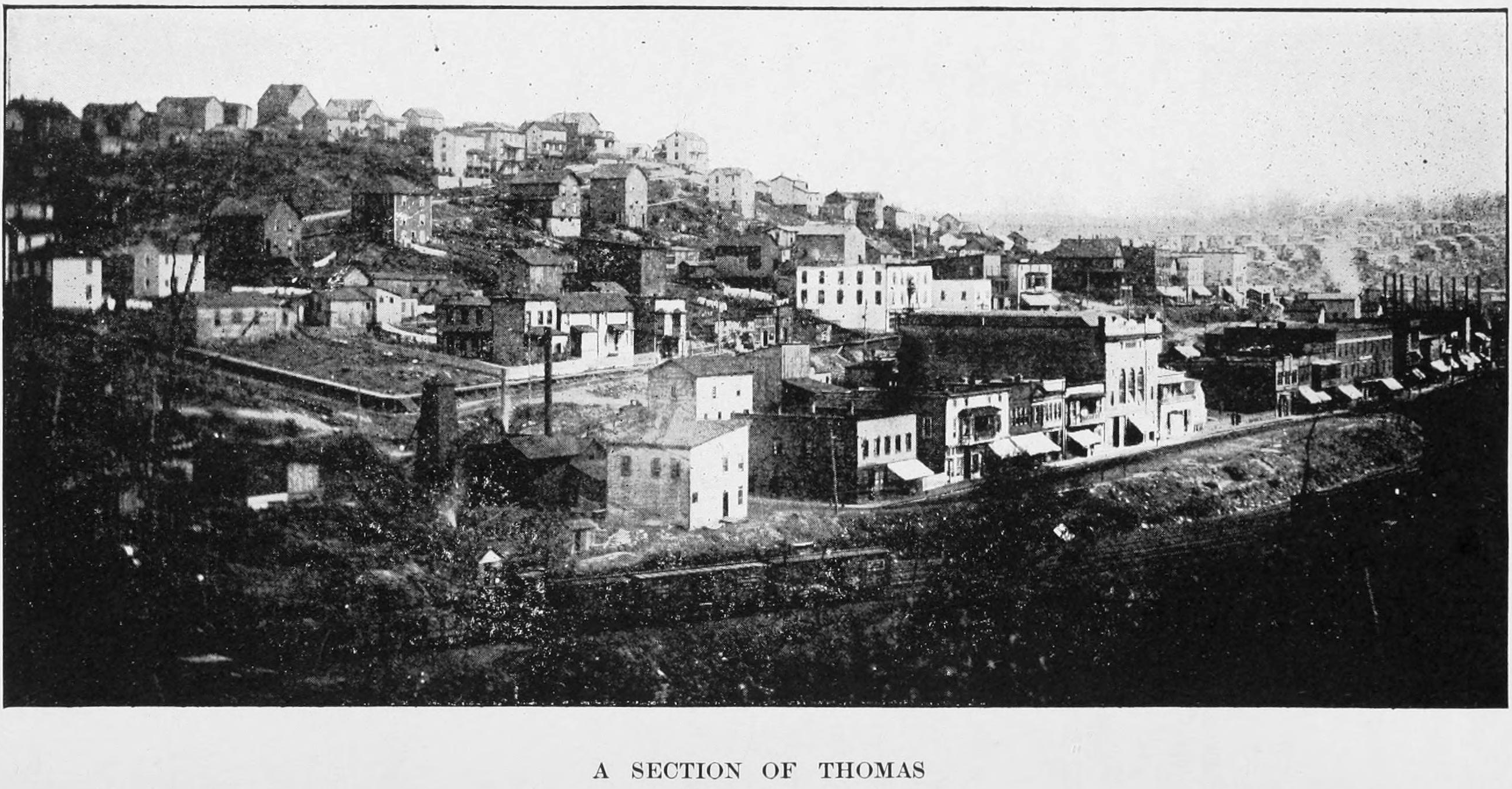
Thomas in 1906

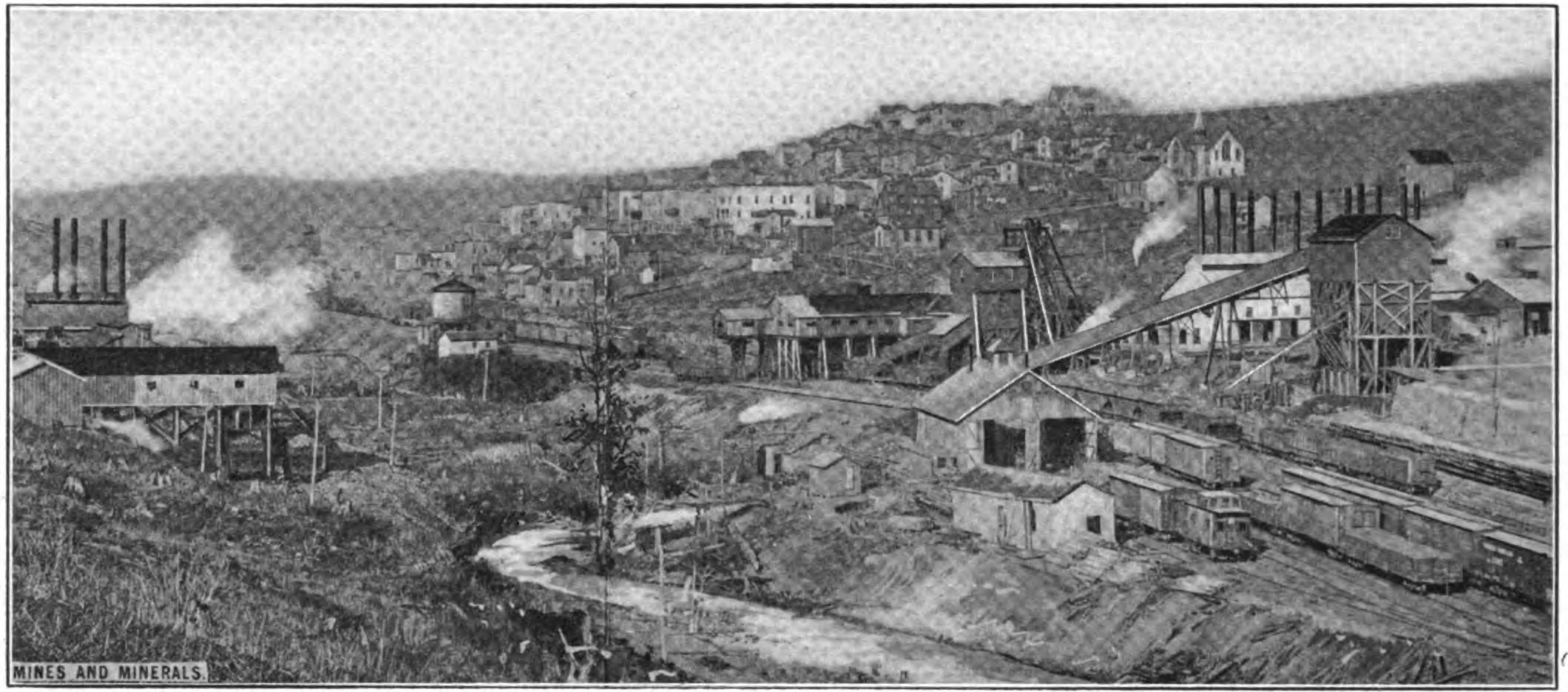
Davis Coal and Coke Co Mining Operation

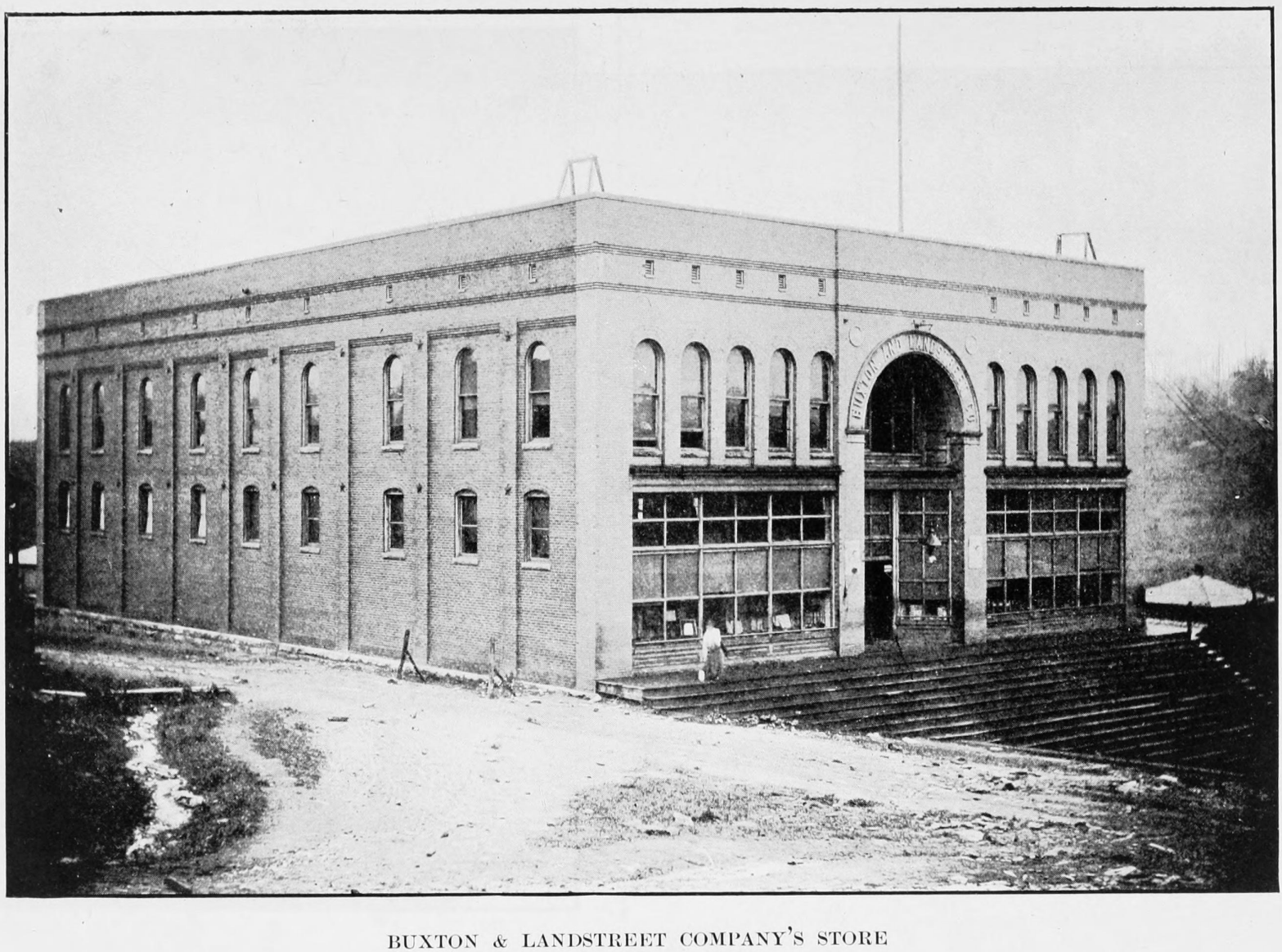
Buxton and Landstreet Company Store

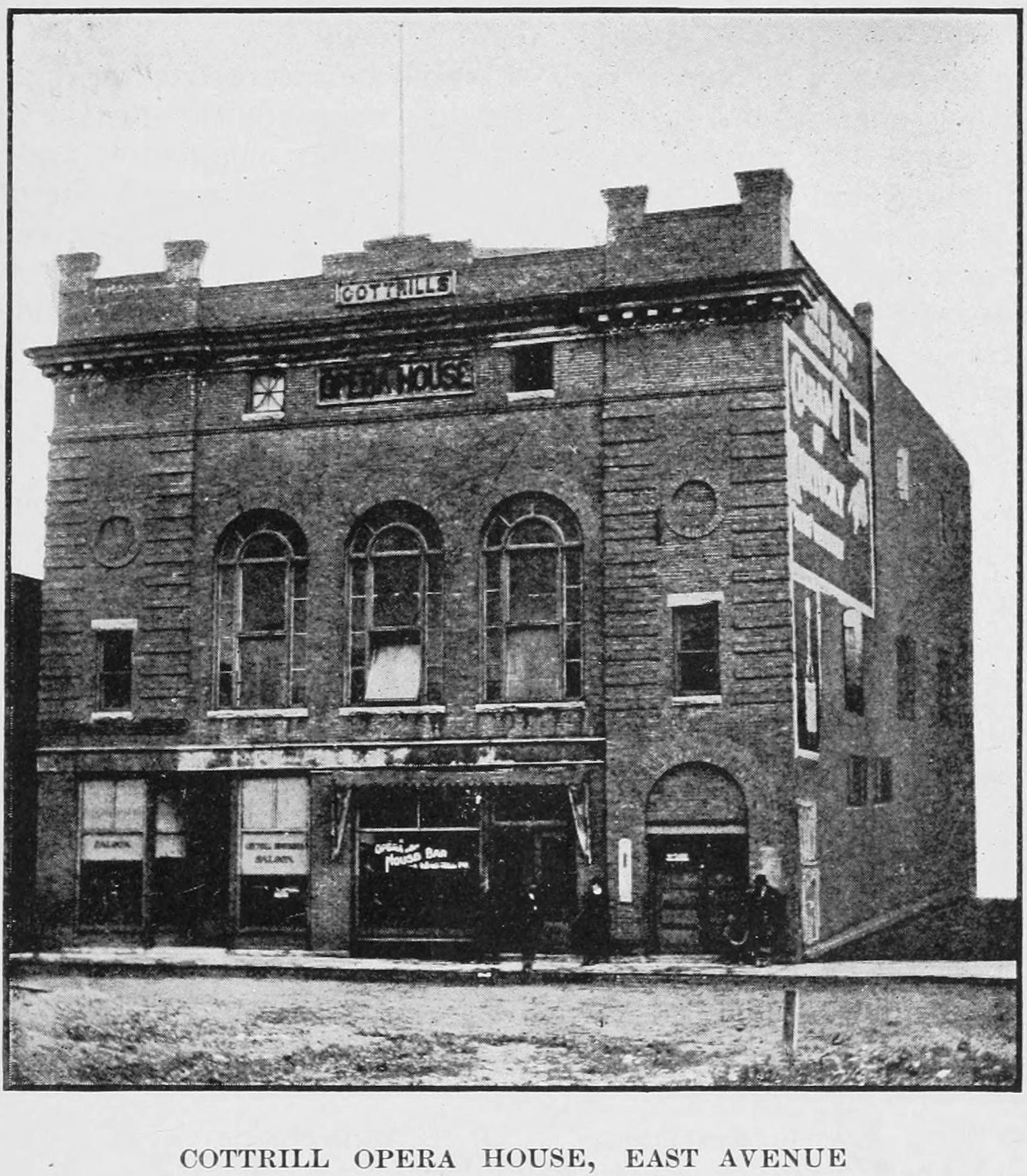
Cottrill Opera House

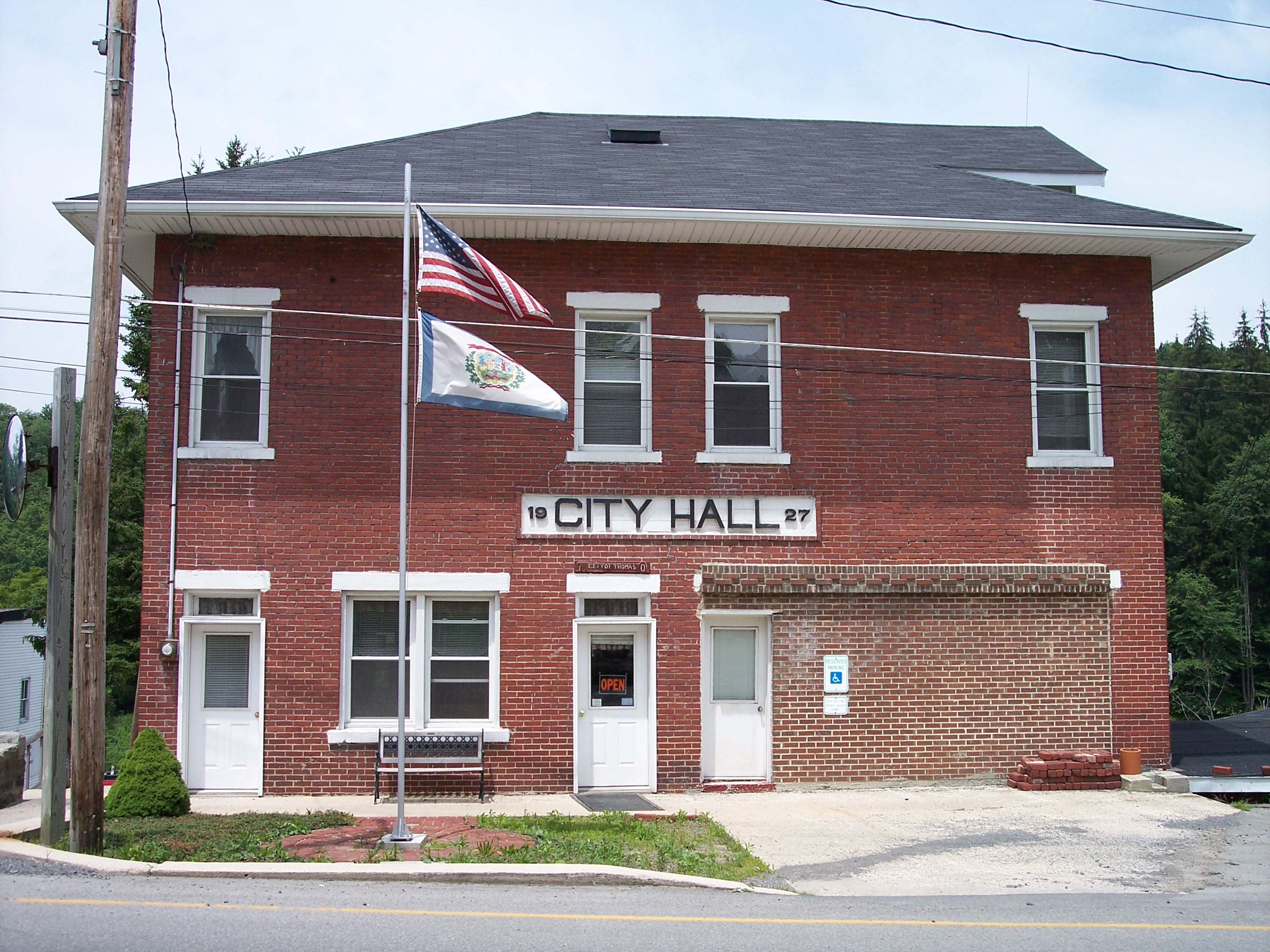
Thomas City Hall in 2006

== Geography ==
Thomas is located along the North Fork of the Blackwater River.

According to the United States Census Bureau, the city has a total area of 4.51 square miles (11.68 km^{2}), of which 4.46 square miles (11.55 km^{2}) is land and 0.05 square miles (0.13 km^{2}) is water.

=== Climate ===
The climate in this area has mild differences between highs and lows, and there is adequate rainfall year-round. Thomas has a humid continental climate (Koppen: Dfb).

== Demographics ==
Historical population
Census	Pop.	Note	%±
1890	269		—
1900	2,126		690.3%
1910	2,354		10.7%
1920	2,099		−10.8%
1930	1,660		−20.9%
1940	1,449		−12.7%
1950	1,146		−20.9%
1960	830		−27.6%
1970	713		−14.1%
1980	747		4.8%
1990	573		−23.3%
2000	452		−21.1%
2010	586		29.6%
2020	611		4.3%
2021 (est.)	614		0.5%
U.S. Decennial Census

=== 2020 census ===
As of the 2020 census, Thomas had a population of 611. The median age was 55.5 years. 16.0% of residents were under the age of 18 and 39.8% of residents were 65 years of age or older. For every 100 females there were 88.6 males, and for every 100 females age 18 and over there were 84.5 males age 18 and over.

0.0% of residents lived in urban areas, while 100.0% lived in rural areas.

There were 264 households in Thomas, of which 26.1% had children under the age of 18 living in them. Of all households, 33.7% were married-couple households, 23.1% were households with a male householder and no spouse or partner present, and 37.1% were households with a female householder and no spouse or partner present. About 45.8% of all households were made up of individuals and 25.8% had someone living alone who was 65 years of age or older.

There were 351 housing units, of which 24.8% were vacant. The homeowner vacancy rate was 1.1% and the rental vacancy rate was 10.4%.

Racial composition as of the 2020 census
Race	Number	Percent
White	589	96.4%
Black or African American	0	0.0%
American Indian and Alaska Native	0	0.0%
Asian	0	0.0%
Native Hawaiian and Other Pacific Islander	0	0.0%
Some other race	1	0.2%
Two or more races	21	3.4%
Hispanic or Latino (of any race)	5	0.8%

=== 2010 census ===
As of the census of 2010, there were 586 people, 253 households, and 130 families living in the city. The population density was 131.4 inhabitants per square mile (50.7/km^{2}). There were 345 housing units at an average density of 77.4 per square mile (29.9/km^{2}). The racial makeup of the city was 99.5% White, 0.2% Native American, and 0.3% from two or more races. Hispanic or Latino of any race were 0.3% of the population.

There were 253 households, of which 17.4% had children under the age of 18 living with them, 37.2% were married couples living together, 7.9% had a female householder with no husband present, 6.3% had a male householder with no wife present, and 48.6% were non-families. 42.3% of all households were made up of individuals, and 22.1% had someone living alone who was 65 years of age or older. The average household size was 1.95 and the average family size was 2.62.

The median age in the city was 56.6 years. 11.3% of residents were under the age of 18; 5.4% were between the ages of 18 and 24; 19.2% were from 25 to 44; 28.8% were from 45 to 64; and 35.2% were 65 years of age or older. The gender makeup of the city was 46.8% male and 53.2% female.

=== 2000 census ===
As of the census of 2000, there were 452 people, 224 households, and 127 families living in the city. The population density was 753.6 people per square mile (290.9/km^{2}). There were 280 housing units at an average density of 466.8 per square mile (180.2/km^{2}). The racial makeup of the city was 98.67% White, and 1.33% from two or more races.

There were 224 households, out of which 16.5% had children under the age of 18 living with them, 46.0% were married couples living together, 7.6% had a female householder with no husband present, and 42.9% were non-families. 39.7% of all households were made up of individuals, and 23.7% had someone living alone who was 65 years of age or older. The average household size was 2.02 and the average family size was 2.69.

In the city, the population was spread out, with 15.0% under the age of 18, 5.5% from 18 to 24, 24.1% from 25 to 44, 33.8% from 45 to 64, and 21.5% who were 65 years of age or older. The median age was 48 years. For every 100 females, there were 85.2 males. For every 100 females age 18 and over, there were 87.3 males.

The median income for a household in the city was $22,443, and the median income for a family was $25,417. Males had a median income of $27,188 versus $14,886 for females. The per capita income for the city was $14,918. About 13.8% of families and 13.7% of the population were below the poverty line, including 19.1% of those under age 18 and 11.5% of those age 65 or over.
