= Mill Run =

Mill Run may refer to a geographic feature in the United States:

== Streams ==
- Mill Run (Neshannock Creek tributary), a stream in Mercer County, Pennsylvania
- Mill Run (South Branch Potomac River tributary), a stream in Hampshire County, West Virginia
- Mill Run (Susquehanna River tributary), a stream in Wyoming County, Pennsylvania
- Mill Run (Trent River tributary), a stream in Jones County, North Carolina

== Communities ==
- Mill Run, Blair County, Pennsylvania, a census-designated place
- Mill Run, Fayette County, Pennsylvania, an unincorporated community near the Frank Lloyd Wright "Fallingwater"
- Mill Run, Pocahontas County, West Virginia, a ghost town in Pocahontas County, West Virginia
- Mill Run, Tucker County, West Virginia, a ghost town in Tucker County, West Virginia

== See also ==
- Mill Run Playhouse (aka Mill Run Theatre), a theater in the round in Niles, Illinois
- Mill Run Wind Energy Center, a wind farm in Fayette County, Pennsylvania
- Run of the Mill, a song by George Harrison
