= Mill Run, West Virginia =

Mill Run, West Virginia may refer to:

- Mill Run, Pocahontas County, West Virginia, a ghost town in Pocahontas County
- Mill Run, Tucker County, West Virginia, a ghost town in Tucker County
