= Broad Mountain Wind Energy Center =

Wind farm in Pennsylvania

Coordinates: 40°52′09″N 76°05′56″W

The Broad Mountain Wind Energy Center was a proposed wind farm planned for construction on the slopes of Broad Mountain in West Mahanoy and Butler townships in Schuylkill County, Pennsylvania. The first phase of the project was blocked by legal action in the Courts of the Commonwealth of Pennsylvania, though initial funding was allocated, and would have included 8 Gamesa 2MW Wind Turbines that were planned to have been operational in late 2011. Phase two of the project will include 27 additional 2MW wind turbines.

If released by the courts, the new 8 turbine wind farm will have a combined total theoretical peak capacity of 70 MW and produce enough electricity annually to power about 21,000 homes.

Along with wind turbines from nearby Locust Ridge Wind Farm, nearly all of the large wind turbines of Broad Mountain will be visible from Interstate 81 near Frackville, Pennsylvania.

== Funding ==
$5 million was provided through the American Recovery and Reinvestment Act to fund construction of Phase I of the Broad Mountain project.

== Cancellation ==
A group of citizens opposed the construction of the Broad Mountain Wind Energy Center. They challenged the validity of the permit for the wind farm on the grounds that their lives would be adversely affected. The county judge ruled that the developer did not have a vested right to the permit and it was revoked. This was upheld by the appeals court effectively ending construction of the wind farm.

== See also ==
- Wind power in Pennsylvania
