= Climate change in Pennsylvania =

Climate change in the US state of Pennsylvania

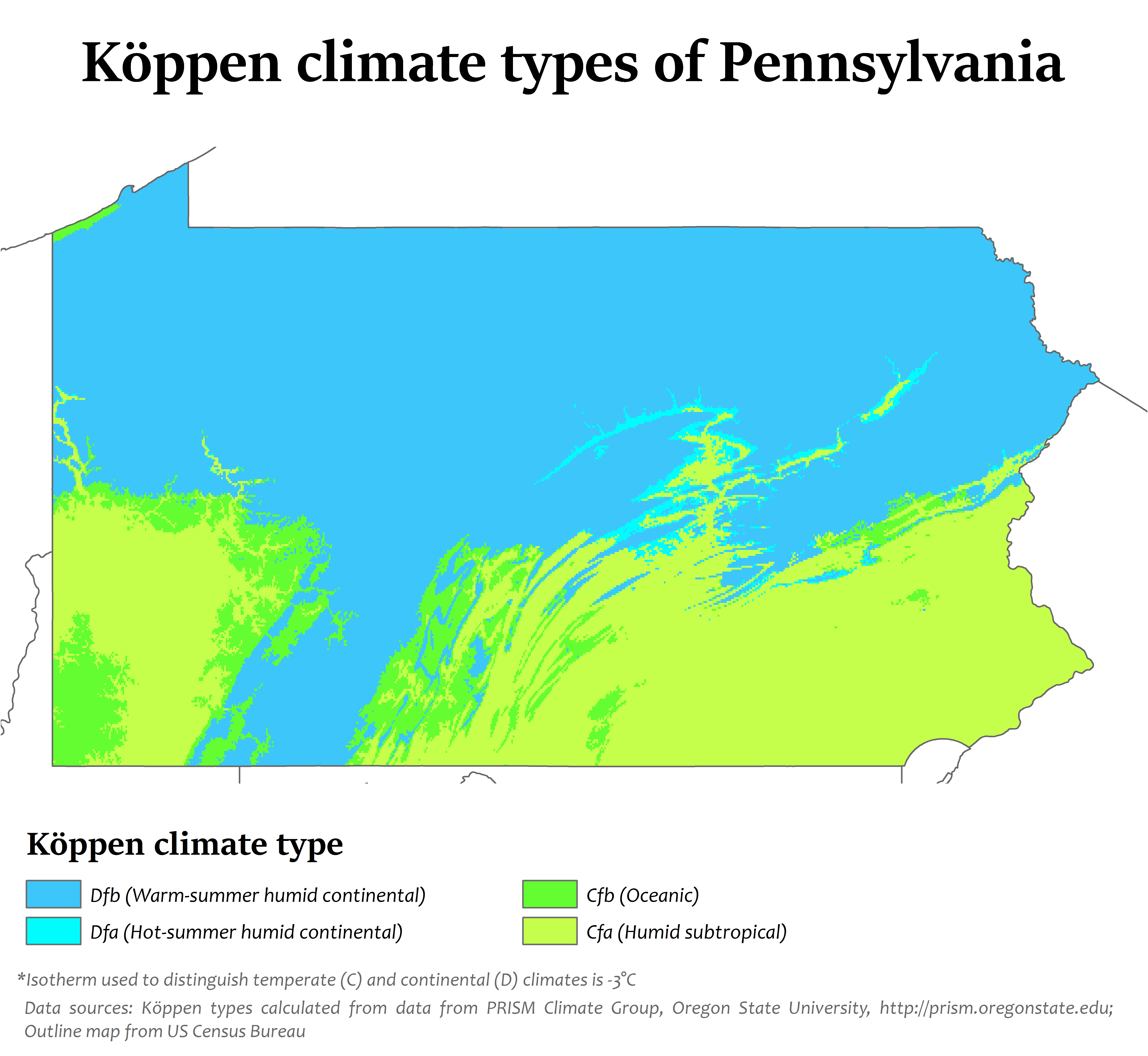
Köppen climate types in Pennsylvania, showing that the climate of the state is a primarily warm summer humid-continental in the north and primarily humid subtropical with patches of oceanic in the south.

Climate change in Pennsylvania encompasses the effects of climate change, attributed to man-made increases in atmospheric carbon dioxide, in the U.S. state of Pennsylvania.

In 2021, Pennsylvania experienced areas of extreme flooding due to Hurricane Ida, which was noted as having characteristics that are probably more common in a warmer climate: the intensity, the rapid intensification, and the amount of rainfall over land.

The United States Environmental Protection Agency (EPA) reports that Pennsylvania has warmed more than half a degree (F) in the last century, heavy rainstorms are more frequent, and the tidal portion of the Delaware River is rising about one inch every eight years. In the coming decades, changing the climate is likely to increase flooding, harm ecosystems, disrupt farming, and increase some risks to human health.

== Increasing temperature and changing precipitation ==
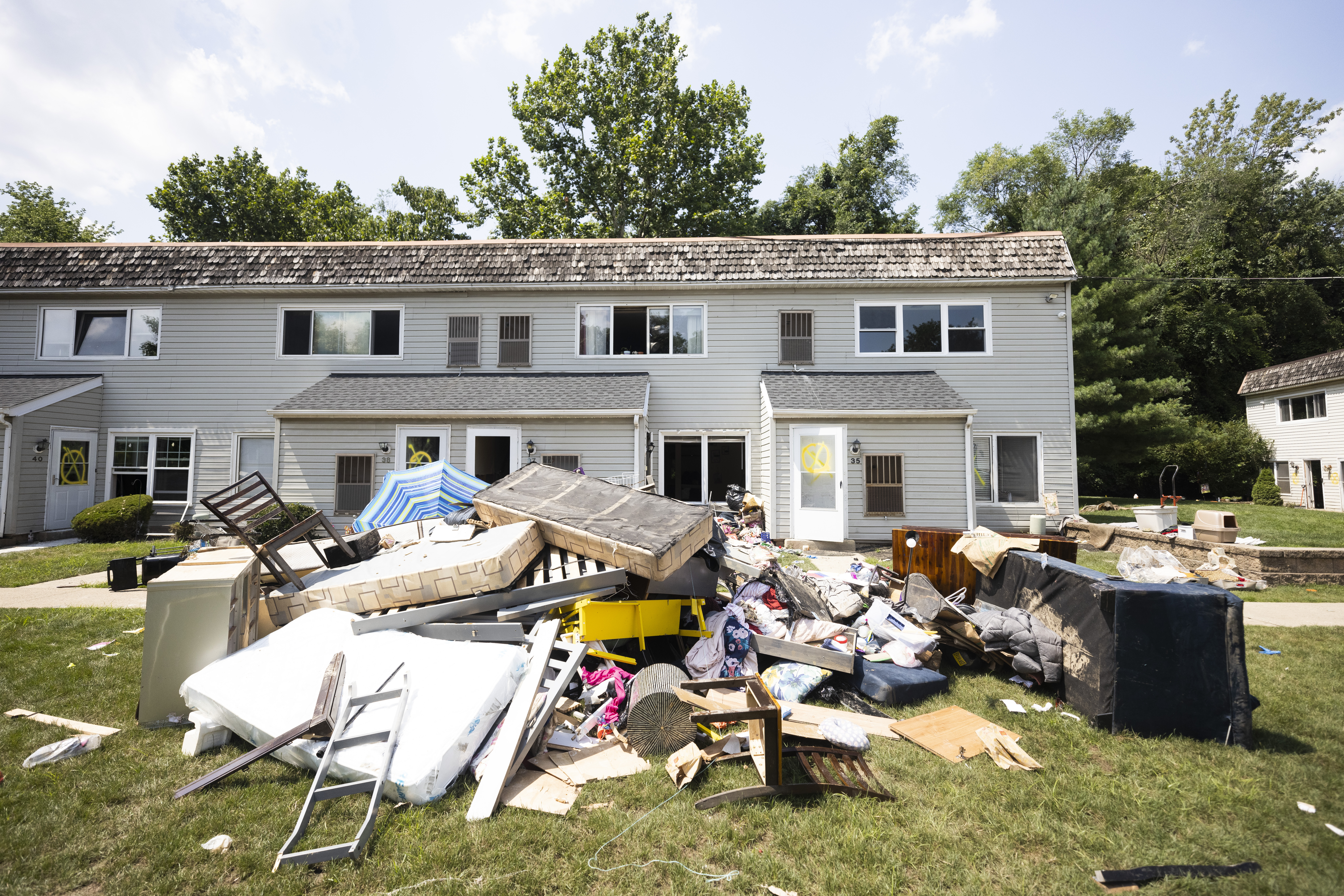
Belongings dry out after a flood, Andalusia, 2021

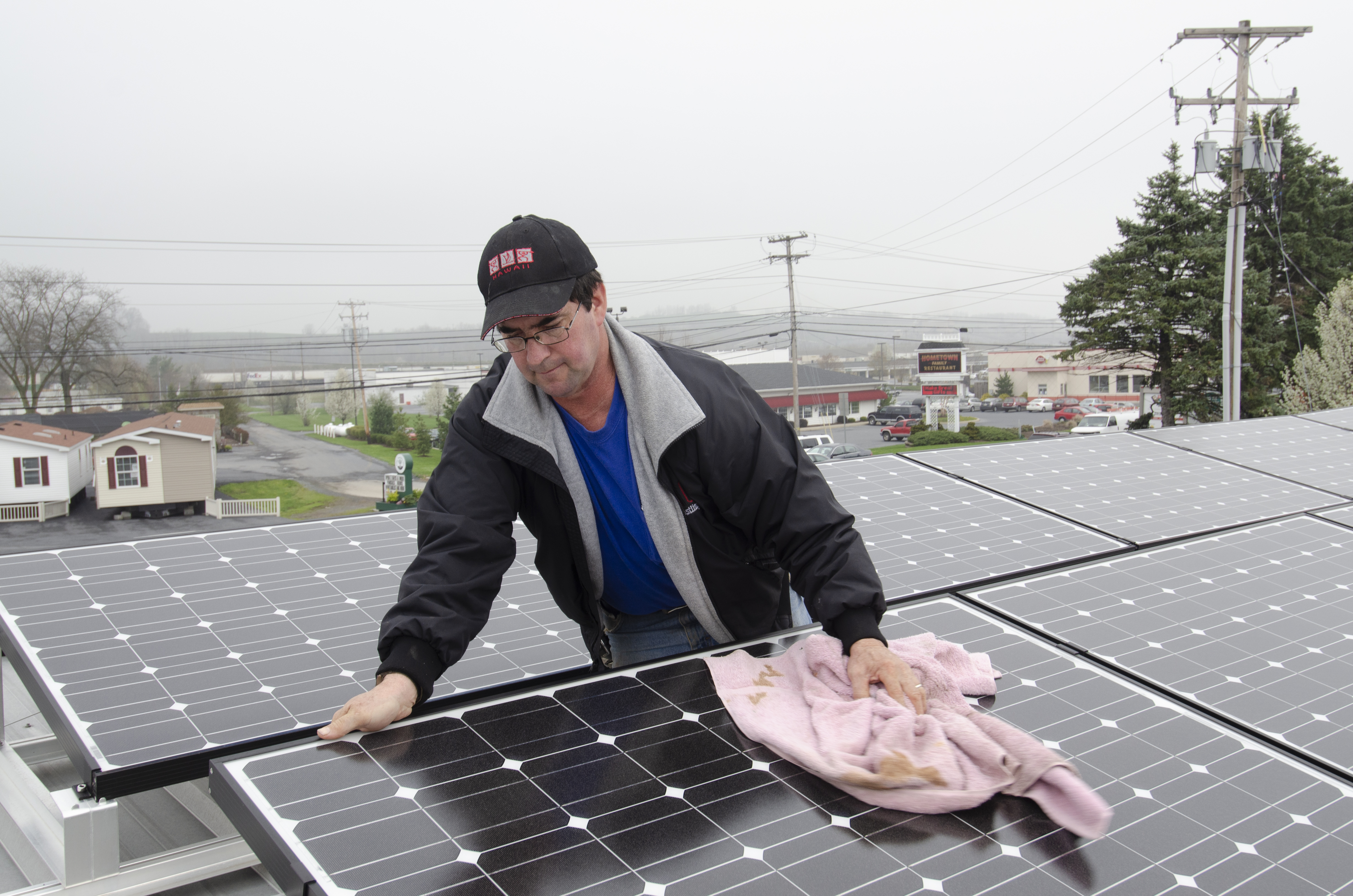
Cleaning solar panels, Palmyra

The EPA reports that rising temperatures and shifting rainfall patterns are likely to increase the intensity of both floods and droughts. Average annual precipitation in Pennsylvania has increased 5 to 10 percent in the last century, and precipitation from extremely heavy storms has increased 70 percent in the Northeast since 1958.

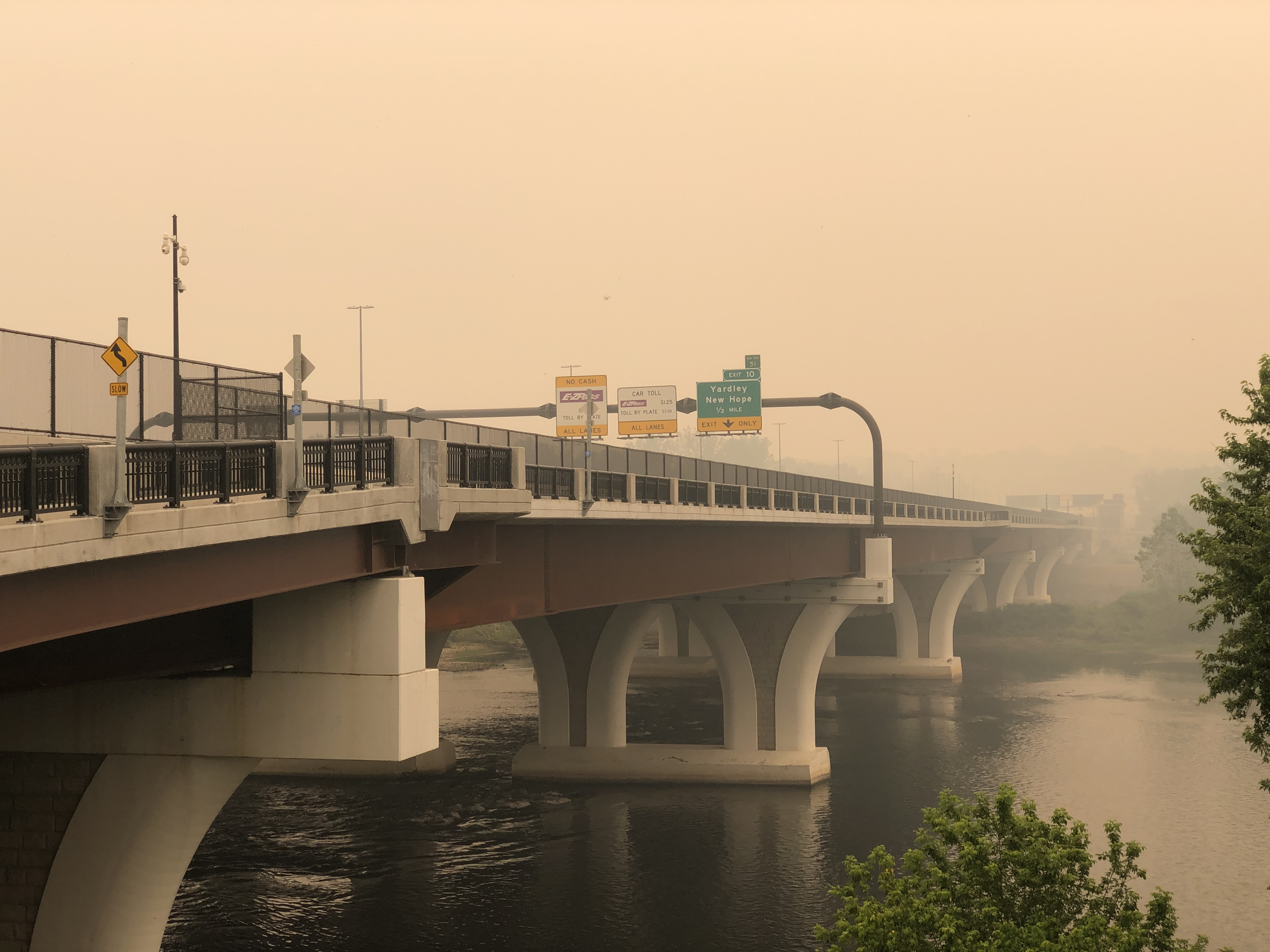
Wildfire smoke pollution, Delaware River, 2023

During the next century, annual precipitation and the frequency of heavy downpours are likely to keep rising. Precipitation is likely to increase during winter and spring, but not change significantly during summer and fall. Rising temperatures will melt snow earlier in spring and increase evaporation, and thereby dry the soil during summer and fall. As a result, changing the climate is likely to intensify flooding during winter and spring, and drought during summer and fall. In 2011, Hurricane Irene caused the Schuylkill River to overflow its banks, flooding a rail line, bike path, and other infrastructure in Philadelphia.

== Higher tides along the Delaware River ==
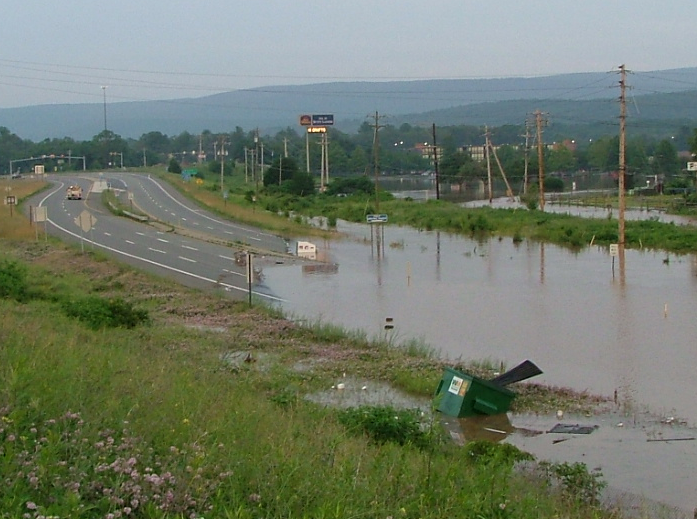
Delaware River flood blocking Route 6

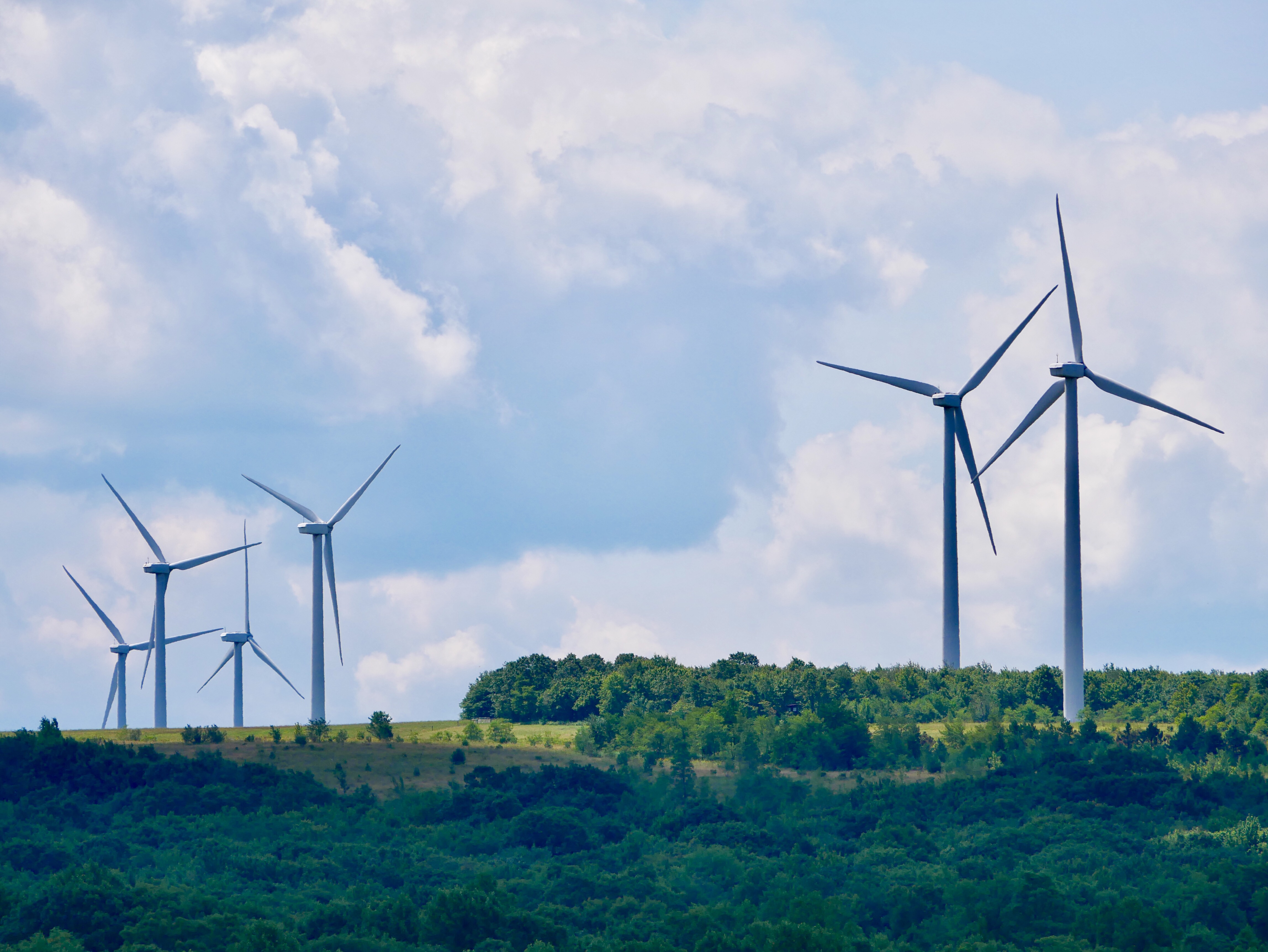
Casselman wind farm

The EPA reports that sea level is rising more rapidly along Pennsylvania's eastern shoreline than in most coastal areas because the Delaware Valley is sinking. If the oceans and atmosphere continue to warm, the tidal portion of the Delaware River is likely to rise one to four feet in the next century. Parts of Philadelphia International Airport and neighborhoods to the north are within two or three feet above the average high tide on the Delaware River. In downtown Philadelphia, Penn's Landing and the Northeast Corridor railroad tracks at 30th Street Station are currently in the 100-year floodplain. Along the Delaware and Schuylkill rivers, a higher sea level could increase the extent of flooding caused by either coastal storms or severe rainstorms, unless communities take measures to hold back the rising rivers.

The tidal freshwater wetlands along the Delaware River are likely to capture enough sediment for their land surfaces to keep pace with rising sea level. But both rising sea level and increasing drought enable salt water to mix farther up the Delaware River, which could kill wetland plants. In places where that occurs, wetlands might be replaced by either salt-tolerant wetland plants or shallow waters. Higher salinity could also create problems for Philadelphia's water supply during droughts, if salty water moves upstream to the city's drinking water intake at Torresdale.

== Inland waters ==
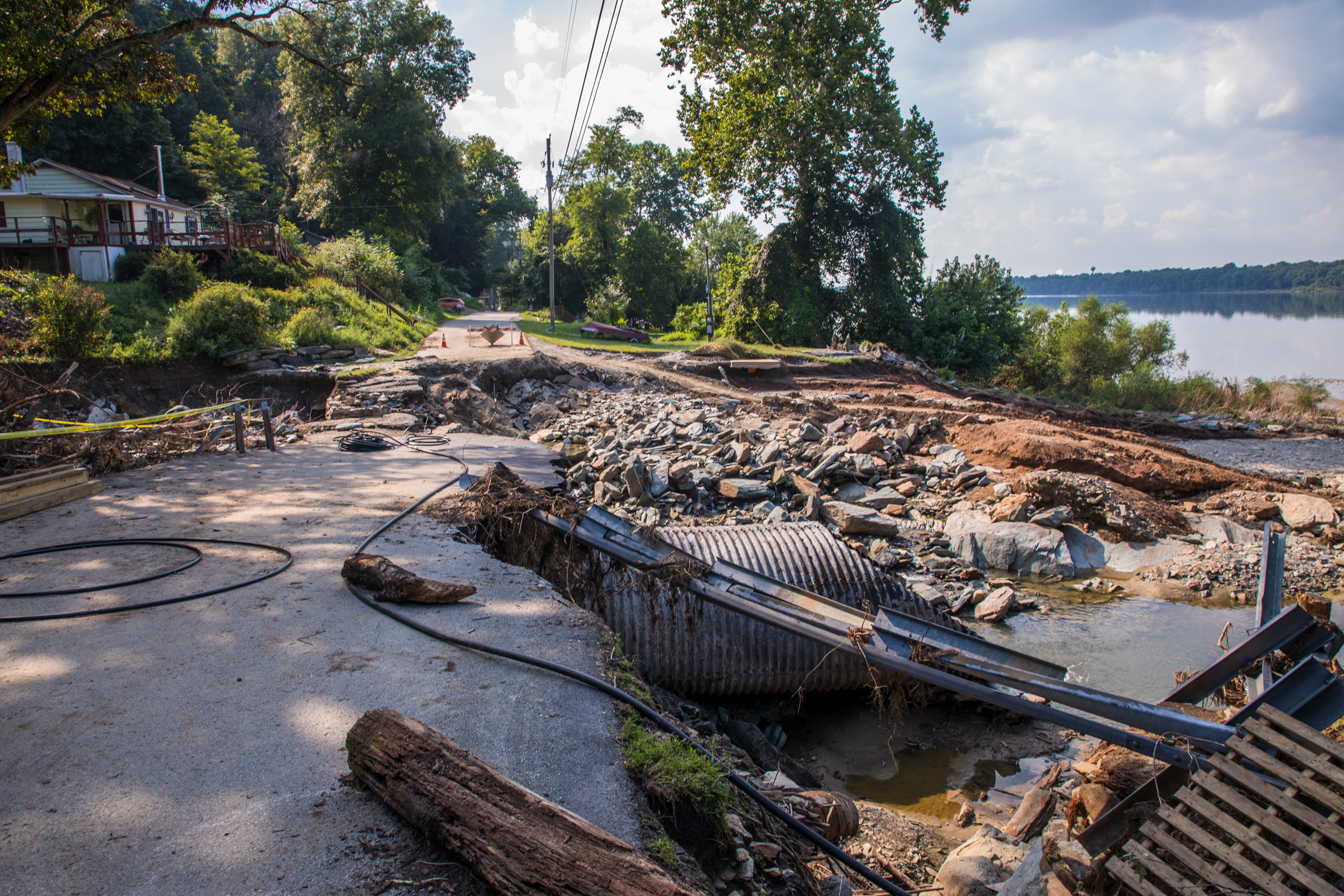
Flood damage, York, 2018

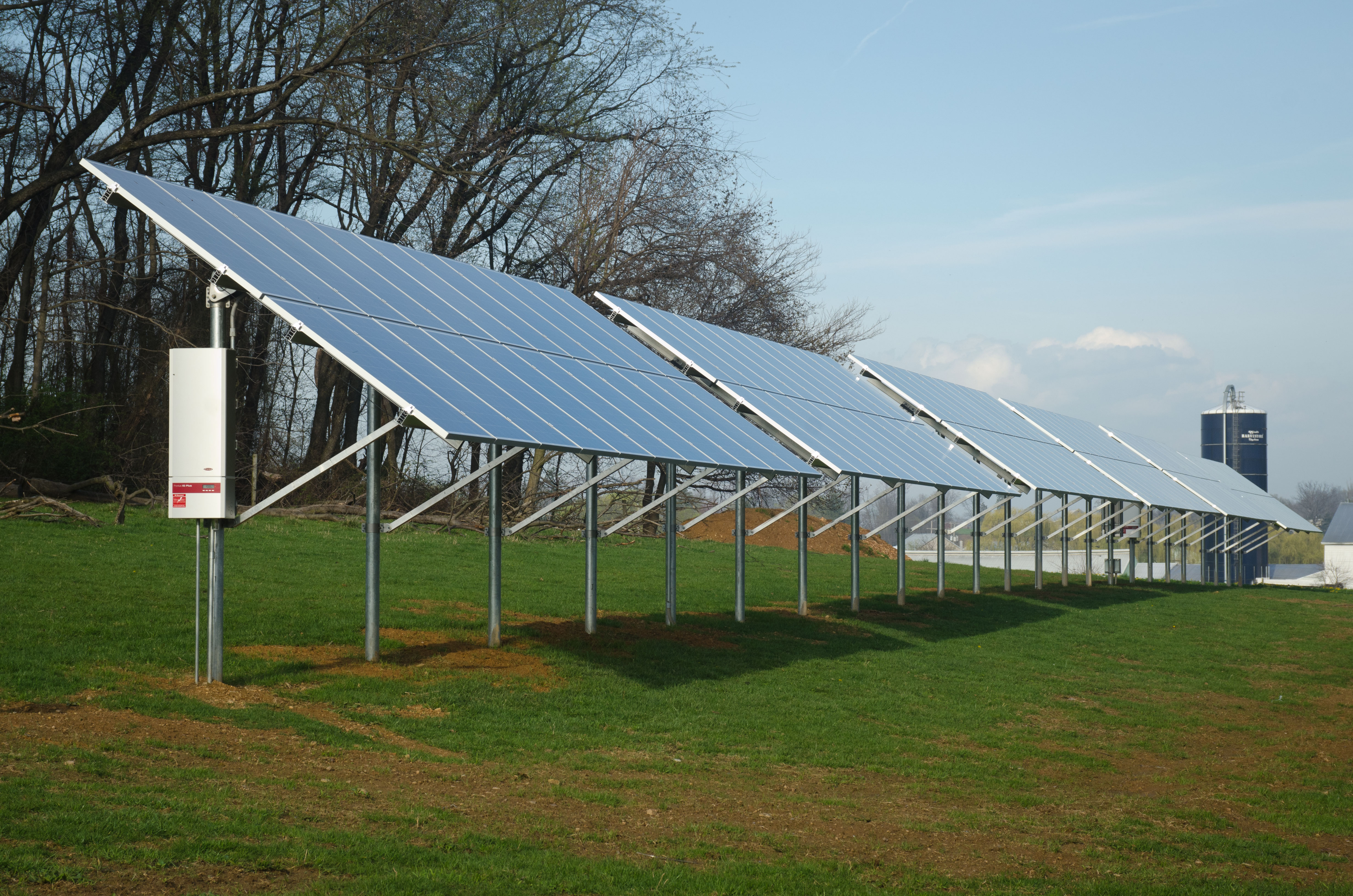
Solar installation, Myerstown

The EPA notes that extraordinarily high river flows occasionally cause problems for commercial navigation along the Ohio and Allegheny rivers, and riverfront communities along the Susquehanna River and smaller tributaries occasionally flood. Heavier storms and greater river flows could make these problems worse. In 2011, heavy rainfall caused record flooding on the Susquehanna and the evacuations of Wilkes-Barre. Conversely, lower summer rainfall and higher evaporation could leave some rivers too shallow for navigation during droughts.

Warmer winters reduce the number of days that ice prevents navigation on rivers and in the Great Lakes. Between 1994 and 2011, reduced ice cover lengthened the shipping season on the Great Lakes by eight additional days. The Great Lakes are likely to warm another 3° to 7°F in the next 70 years, which will further extend the shipping season. The impact of climate change on water quality is less likely to be beneficial. Warmer temperatures tend to cause more algal blooms, which can be unsightly, harm fish, and degrade water quality. Severe storms also increase the amount of pollutants that run off from the land into the water, further increasing the risk of algal blooms.

== Ecosystems ==
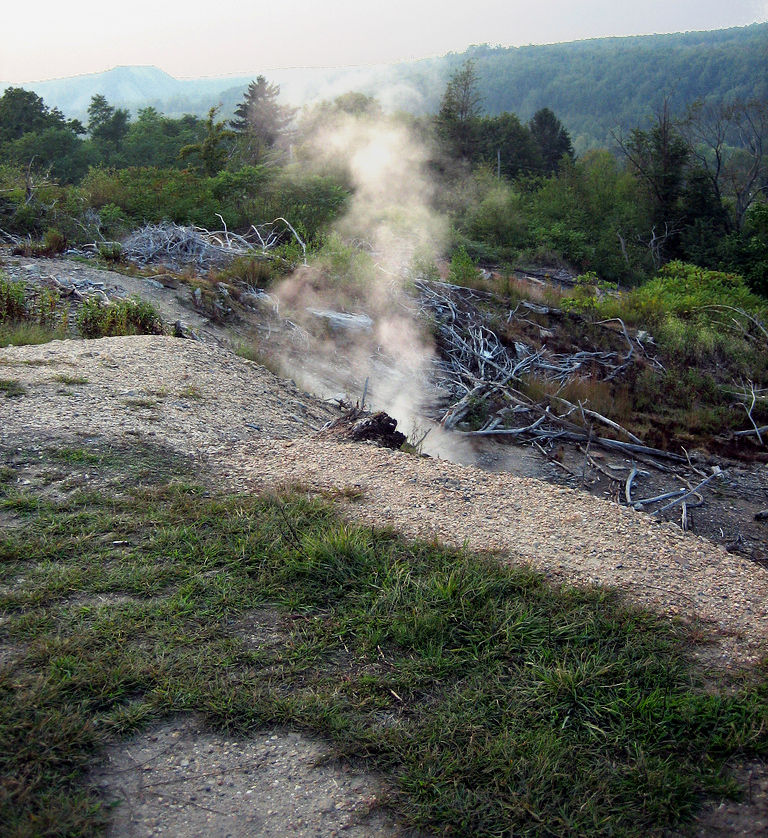
Centralia fire

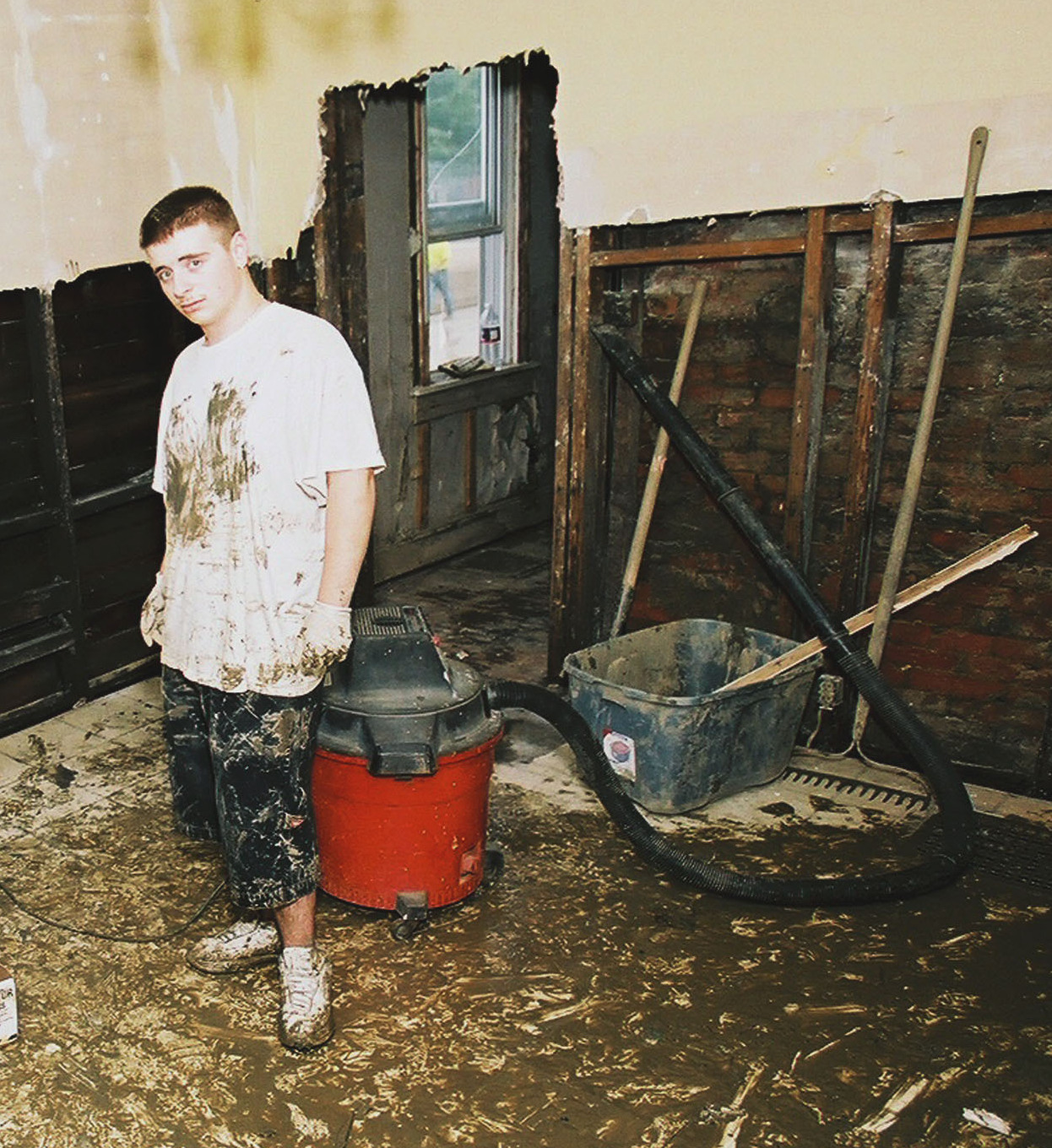
Flood cleanup, Bridgeville

The EPA reports that a changing climate threatens ecosystems by disrupting the existing relationships between species. Wildflowers and woody perennials are blooming—and migratory birds are arriving—sooner in spring. Not all species adjust in the same way, however, so the food that one species needs may no longer be available when that species arrives on its migration. As a result, for example birds in western Pennsylvania have had lower body weights during warm years. Warmer temperatures allow deer populations to increase, leading to a loss of forest underbrush, which, in turn, makes some animals more vulnerable to predators. Rising temperatures also enable invasive species to move into areas that were previously too cold.

== Agriculture ==
Changing climate will have both beneficial and harmful effects on farming, but the net effect is unknown. Longer frost-free growing seasons and higher concentrations of atmospheric carbon dioxide would increase yields for many crops during an average year, notably soybeans. But increasingly hot summers are likely to reduce yields of corn, Pennsylvania's most important crop. The earlier arrival of spring may increase populations of major crop pests, such as the corn earworm and aggressive weeds. Higher temperatures cause cows to eat less and produce less milk, so a warming climate could reduce the output of milk and beef, which together account for more than one-third of the commonwealth's farm revenues.

== See also ==
- Plug-in electric vehicles in Pennsylvania
