= AEPS =

AEPS may refer to:

- Arctic Environmental Protection Strategy
- Advanced Electric Propulsion System, Hall Effect thruster by Aerojet Rocketdyne for NASA
- Aadhaar Enabled Payment System, used in India
- Alternative Energy Portfolio Standards Act of 2004, US
