= Armenia Mountain Wind Farm =

Wind farm in Pennsylvania, United States

Coordinates: 41.766667°N 76.866389°W

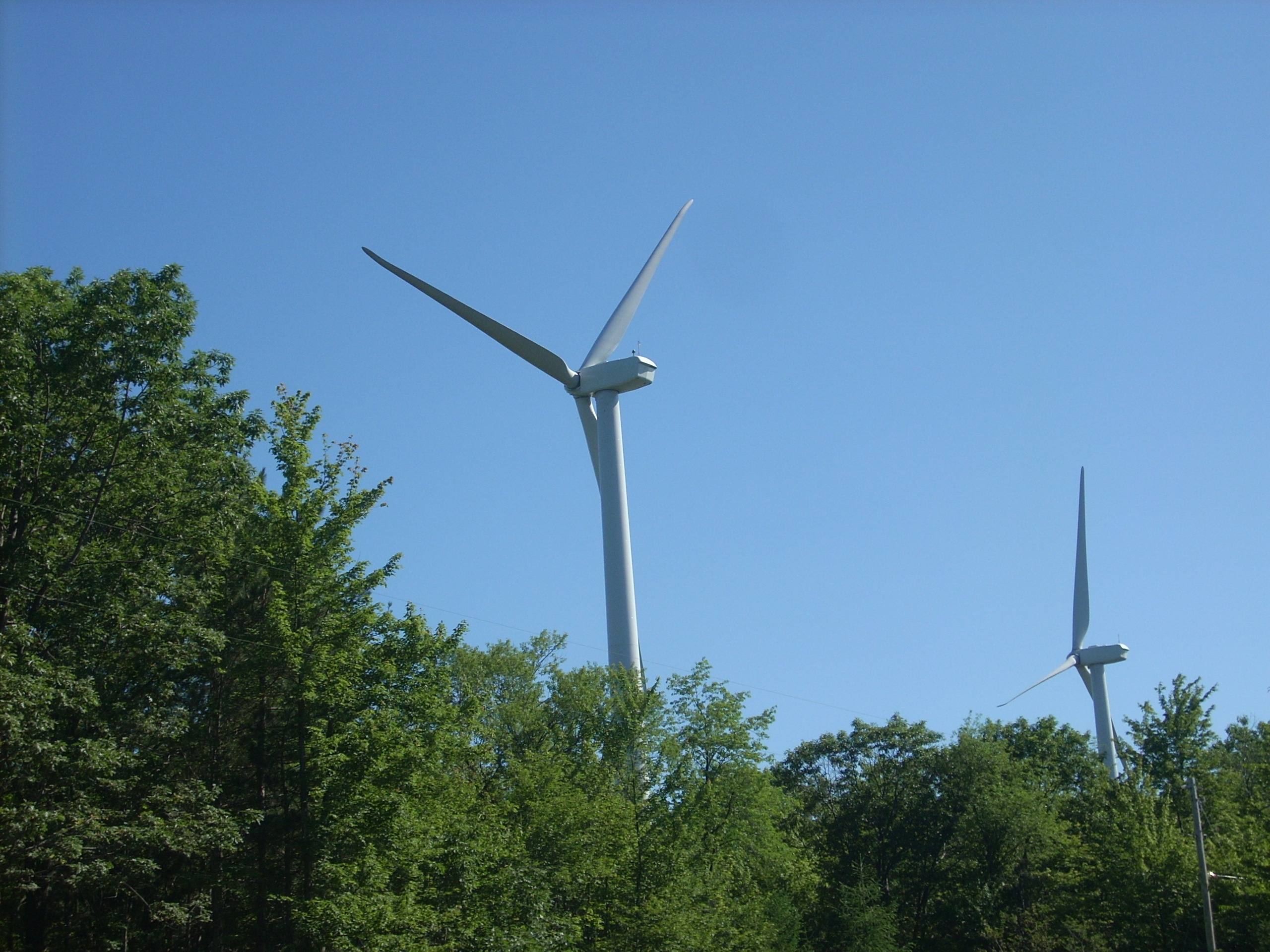
A view of the Armenia Mountain Wind Farm in 2011.

Armenia Mountain Wind Farm is a wind farm in Tioga County and Armenia Township in Bradford County in the Northern Tier region of Pennsylvania. The wind farm has 67 GE 1.5 MW Wind Turbines that began commercial operation in January 2010. Armenia Mountain has a combined total nameplate capacity of 101 megawatts and produces enough electricity to power over 40,000 homes. Power produced by the wind farm is sold to Old Dominion Electric Cooperative and to Delmarva Power & Light Company.

== See also ==
- Wind power in Pennsylvania
