= Somerset Wind Farm =

Renewable energy generator in Pennsylvania, United States

Coordinates: 39°58′59.97″N 79°0′34.14″W

The Somerset Wind Farm is a wind farm in Somerset County, Pennsylvania with six GE 1.5 MW Wind Turbines that began commercial operation in October 2001. The wind farm has a combined total nameplate capacity of 9 MW, and produces about 25,000 megawatt-hours of electricity annually, which is roughly a 30% capacity factor. The wind farm was constructed by NextEra Energy Resources, based in Florida.

The wind farm is just one-half mile (0.80 km) south of the Pennsylvania Turnpike, which makes its 215-foot-tall (66 m) towers easily visible to turnpike travelers.

== Gallery ==
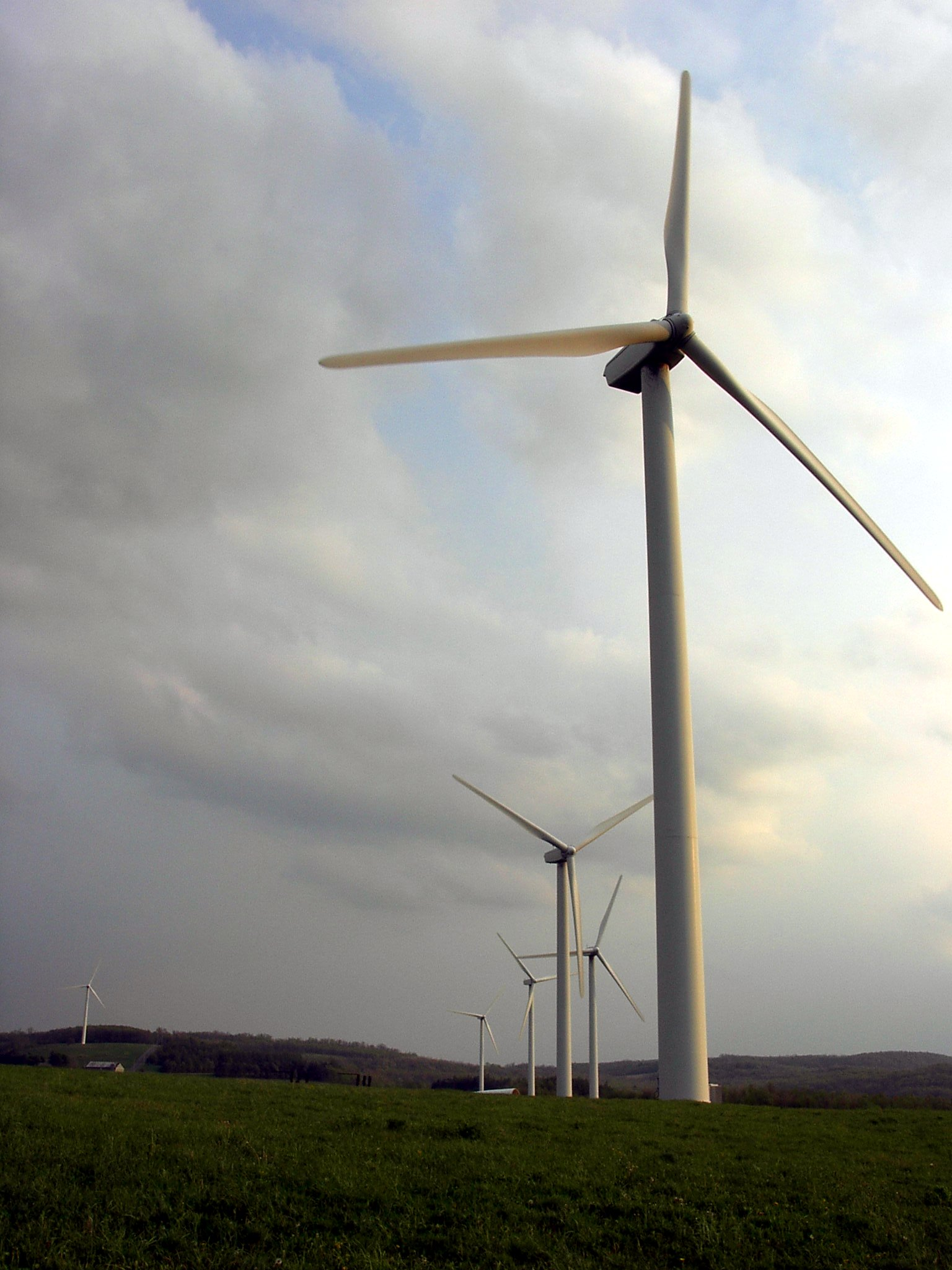
Somerset Wind Farm

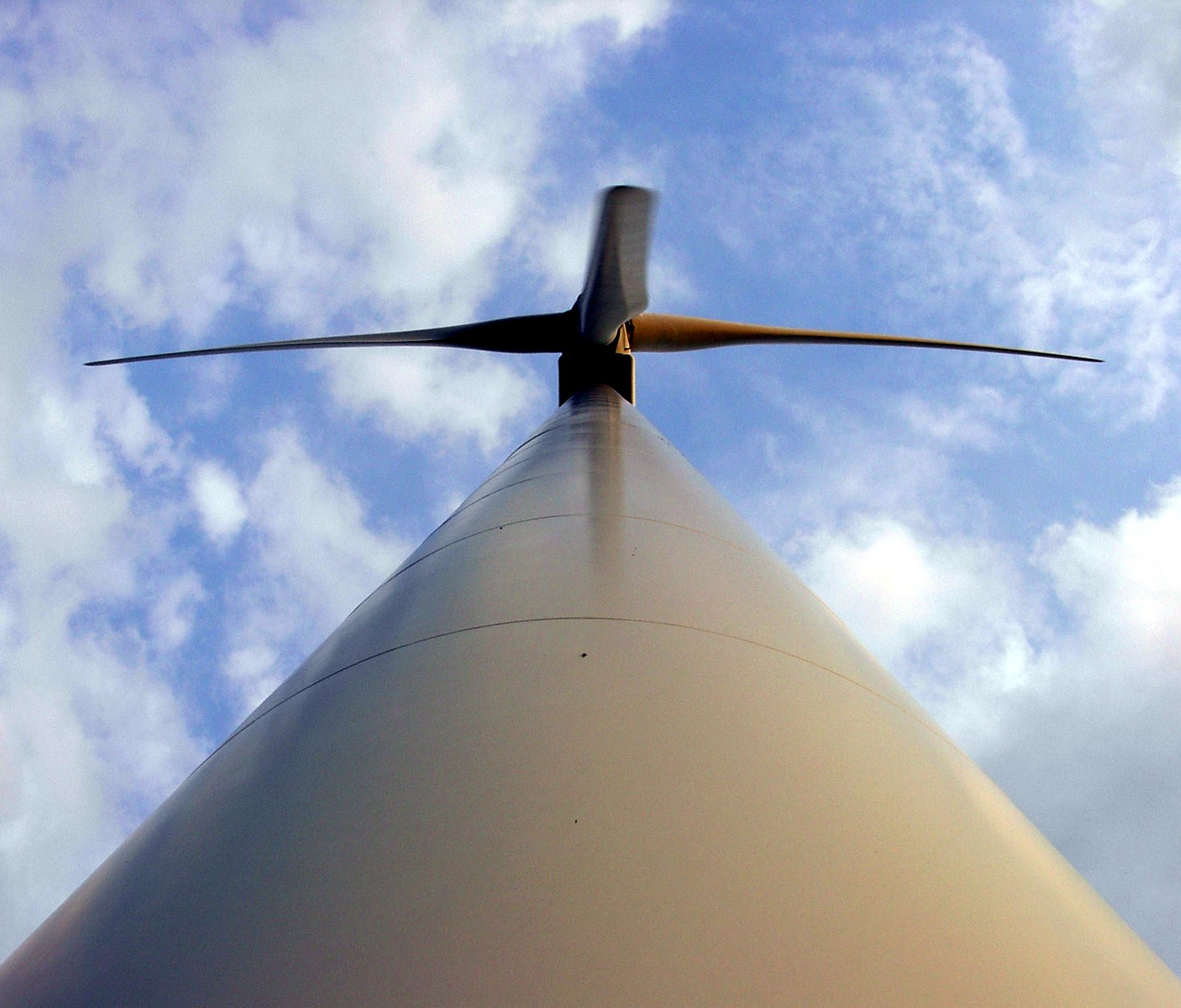
Northernmost wind turbine

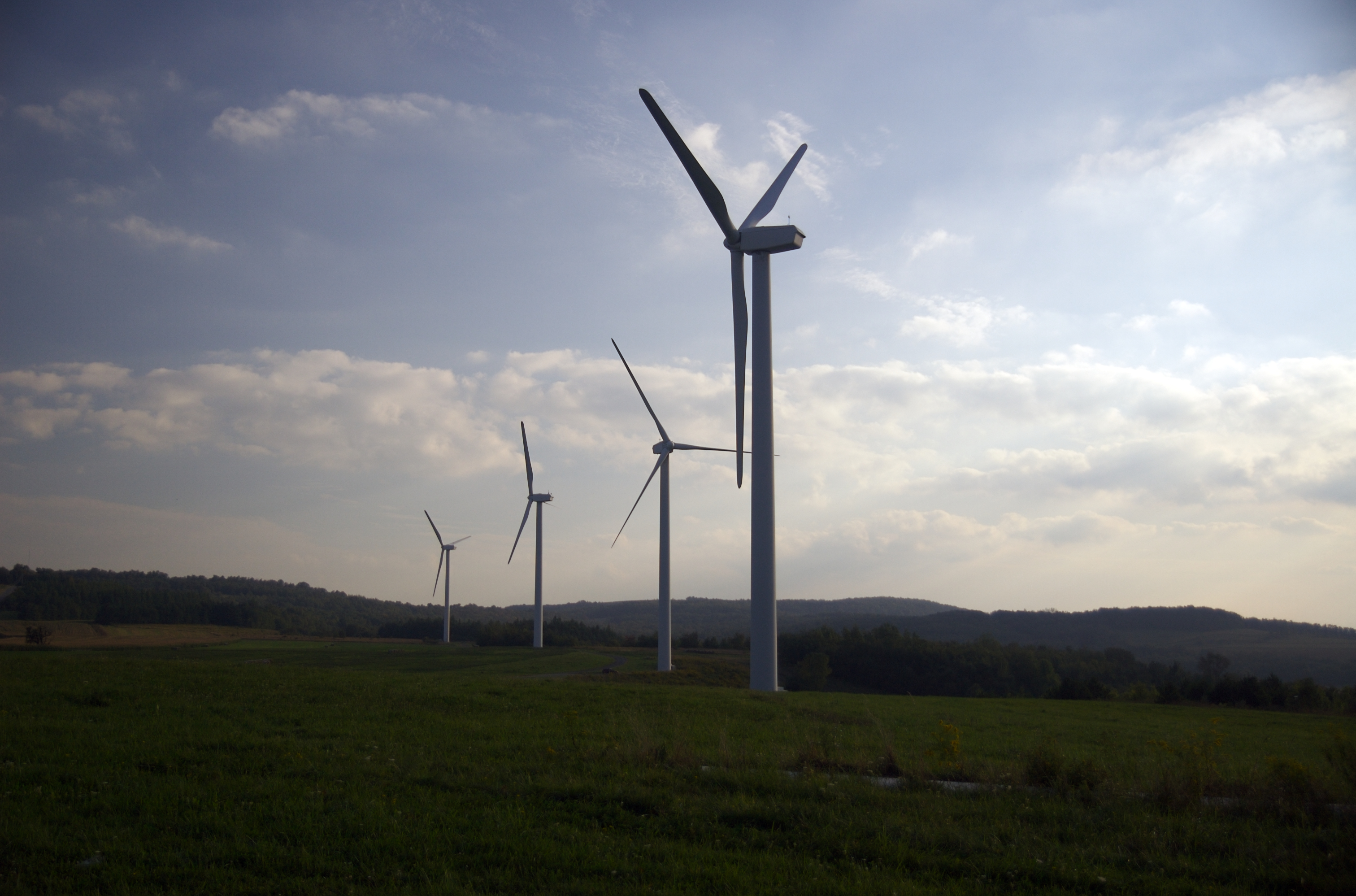
Another view

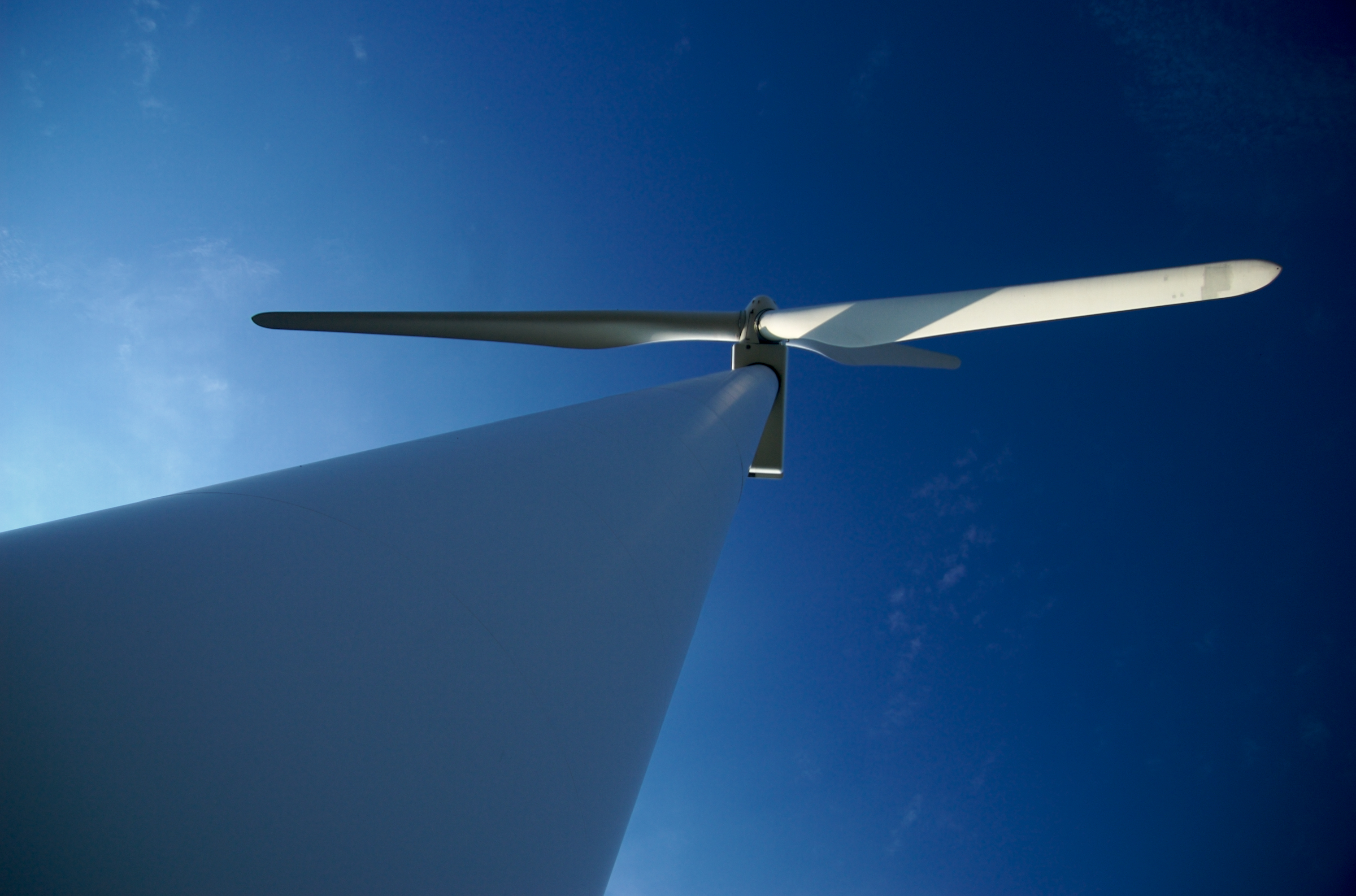

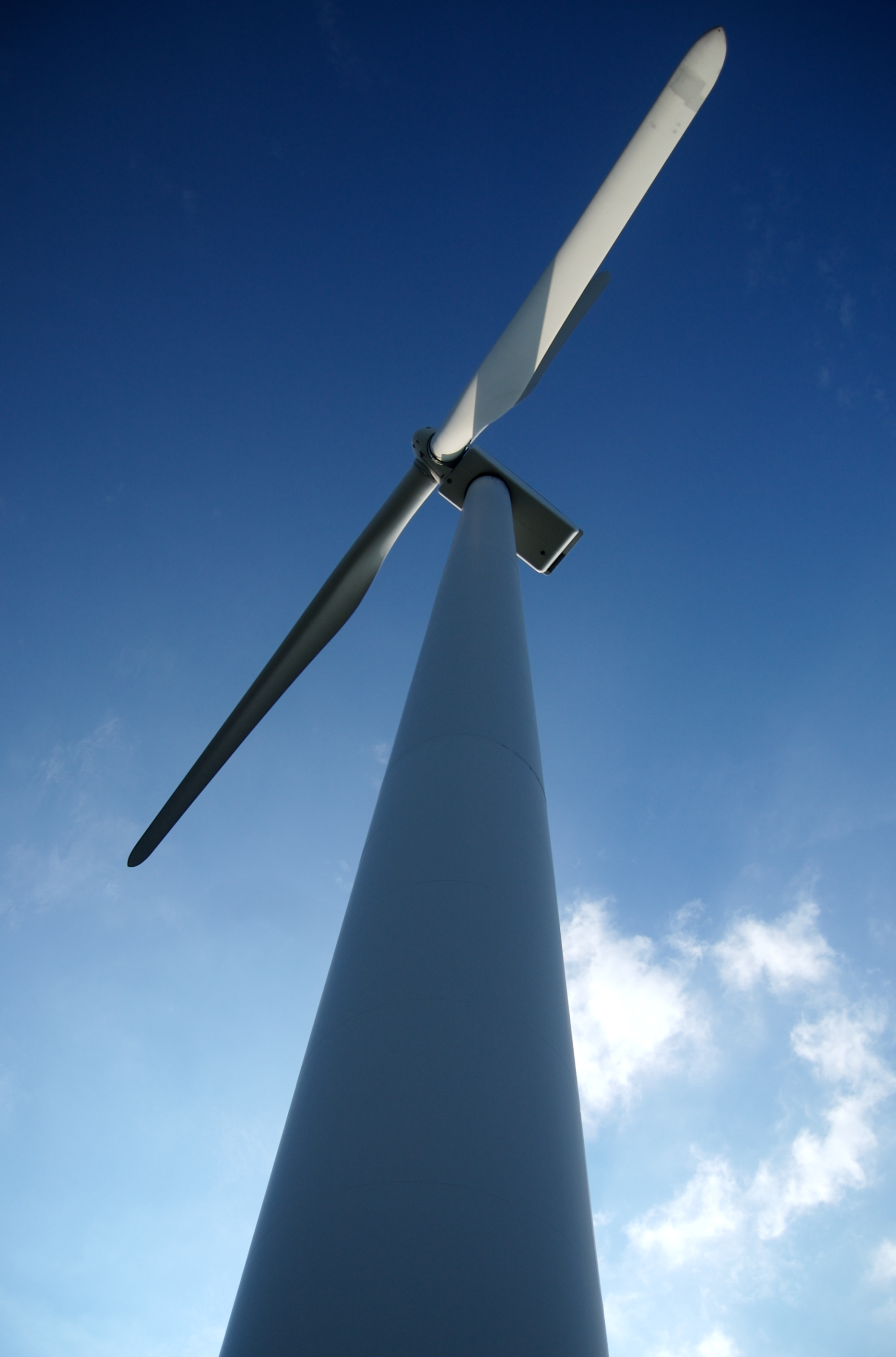

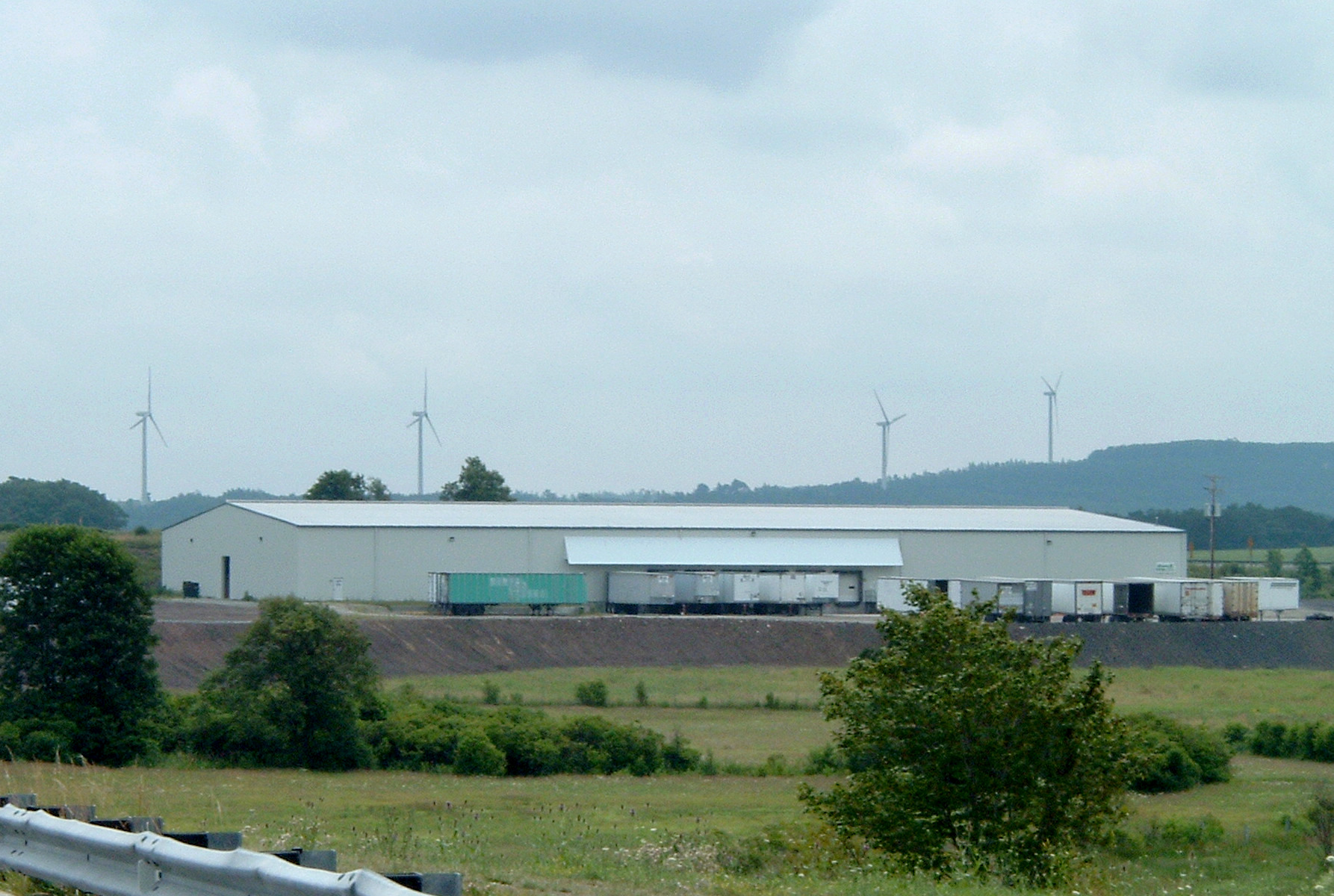

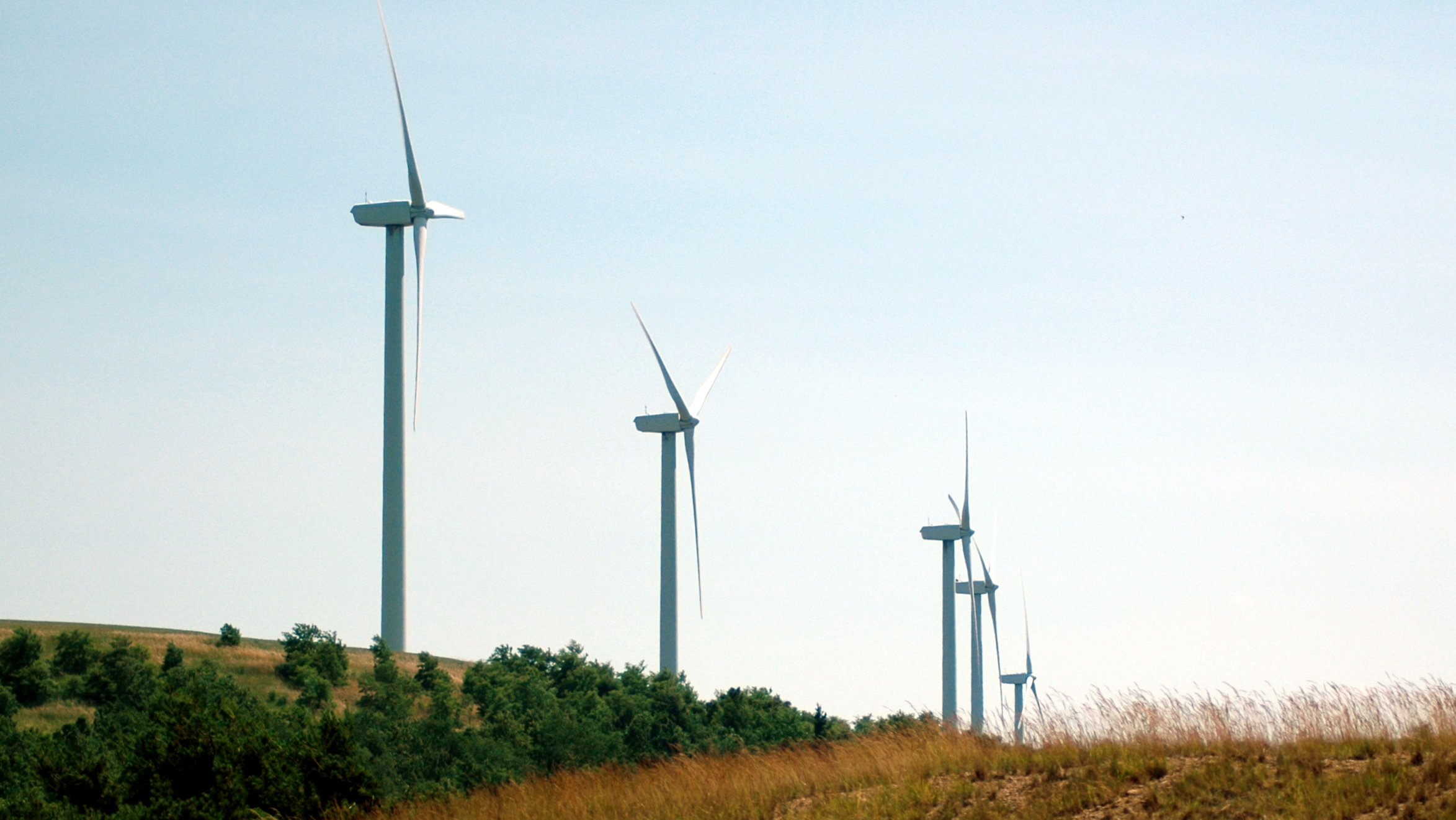

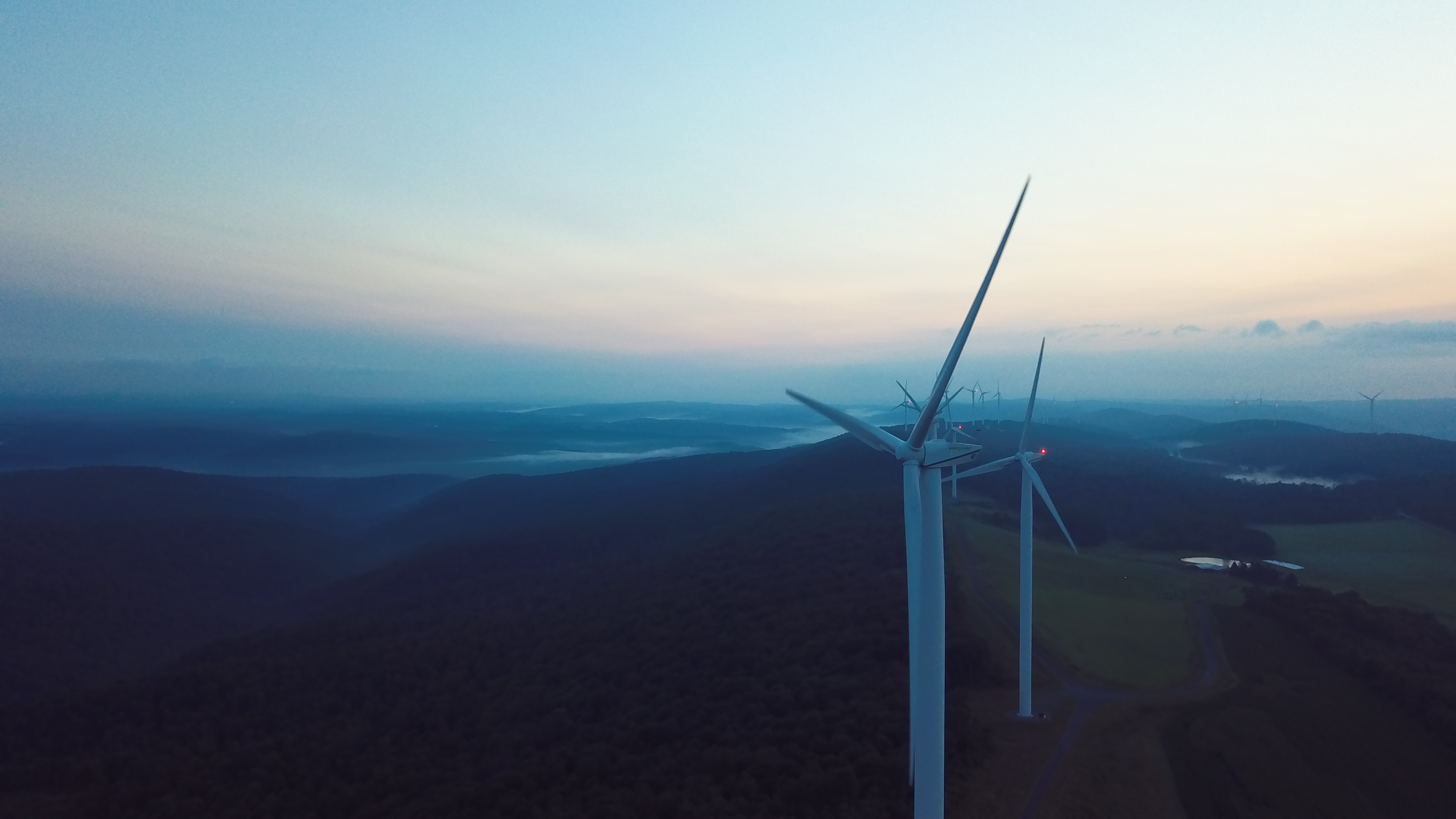
Wind Turbines Somerset 1

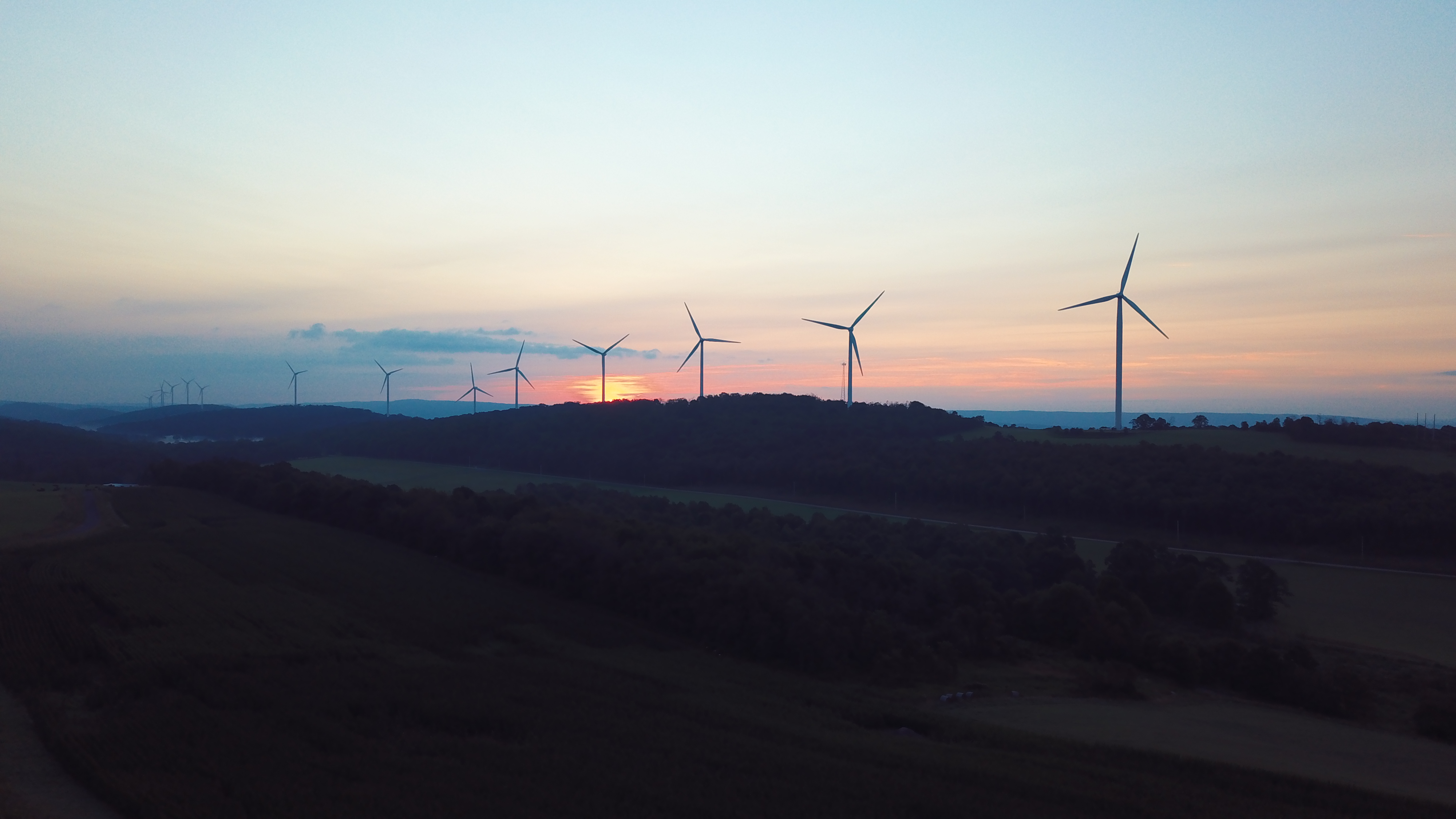

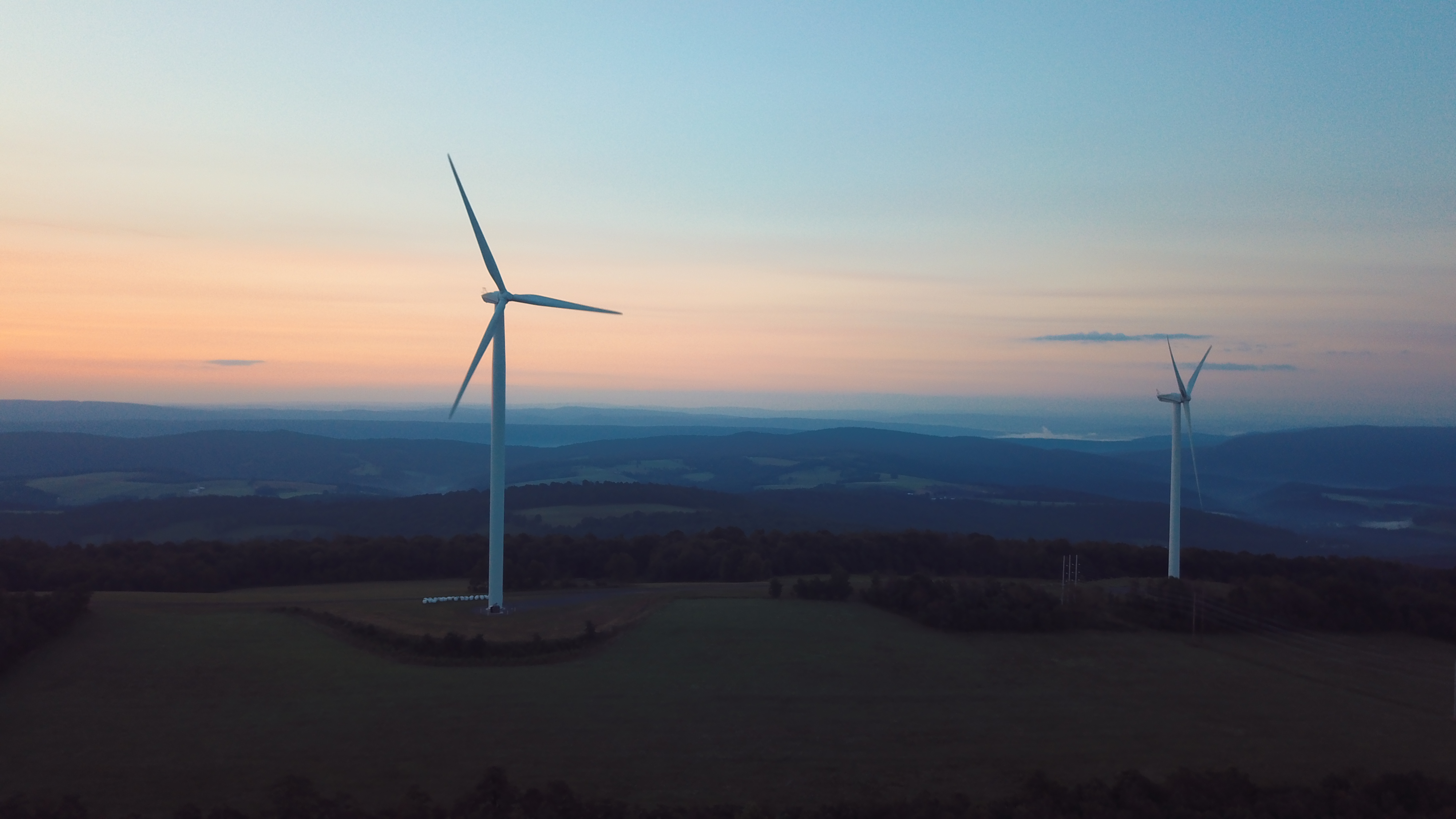
Somerset Wind Farm

== See also ==
- Wind power in Pennsylvania
