= Green Mountain Wind Energy Center =

Wind farm in Pennsylvania, United States

Coordinates: 39°50′58.13″N 79°04′06.11″W

The Green Mountain Wind Energy Center was a wind power plant near Garrett, Somerset County, Pennsylvania with eight Nordex 1.3 MW turbines that began commercial operation in May 2000. This was the first commercial wind farm constructed in Pennsylvania. The wind farm had a combined total nameplate capacity of 10.4 MW and the potential to produce about 27,000 megawatt-hours of electricity annually, enough to power 3,300 homes, assuming a 30% capacity factor. The wind farm was developed by National Wind Power of the UK, now part of NPower Renewables, operated by NextEra Energy Resources, based in Florida. Energy from the wind farm was purchased and sold by Green Mountain Energy based in Texas, and was the first commercial wind farm for Green Mountain Energy. In 2016 the wind farm was dismantled and replaced with new battery technology.

== See also ==
- Wind power in Pennsylvania
