= Green Mountain Energy =

American energy company

- Type: Subsidiary
- Industry: Renewable energy
- Founded: 1997; 29 years ago
- Headquarters: Austin, Texas, US
- Products: Retail and commercial electricity and renewable energy credits
- Parent: NRG Energy
- Website: greenmountainenergy.com

Green Mountain Energy is a United States company that sells green electricity products via renewable energy credits.

== History ==
Green Mountain Energy was founded in Vermont in 1997 by Sam Wyly as an offshoot of Green Mountain Power to take advantage of the deregulation of the Texas electricity market. In September 2000, the company moved its headquarters to Austin, Texas. In January 2002, Green Mountain began serving the Texas market and was the first to offer alternative energy in the state. In August 2009 Green Mountain Energy expanded to New York City, serving those in the Con Edison service territory.

In November 2010 Green Mountain Energy was acquired by NRG Energy for $350 million. At that time Green Mountain Energy operated as a standalone subsidiary of NRG, but now operates as one of NRG's brands.

In May 2009 the company launched a "Renewable Rewards" Buy-Back program, which credits customers with renewable generation facilities in their homes for excess energy their facility sends back to the electric grid.

In April 2011 the company launched a solar leasing program for residential solar panels, and announced "Pollution Free EV", a wind electricity product for electric vehicle owners.

In January 2011 Green Mountain Energy signed a two-year agreement to provide 100% renewable energy to the Empire State Building, the largest commercial green power purchase in New York City at that time. In February 2012, the company partnered with the National Football League (NFL) to power Super Bowl XLVI with 15 million kWh of renewable energy. In June 2012, Green Mountain Energy expanded to Pennsylvania, serving those in the PECO and PPL service territories.

== Residential services ==
Green Mountain Energy serves electricity to residential customers who live in the United States with unregulated electricity markets, such as Maryland, Illinois, Massachusetts, New Jersey, New York, Pennsylvania, and Texas. Green Mountain Energy also partners with utilities in regulated markets in the U.S., such as Portland General Electric (PGE) in Oregon, to offer their products.

== Commercial services ==
Green Mountain's commercial and industrial division offers products to customers in Texas, New York, and Pennsylvania. The commercial division began in 2004. In 2011, a new division, Green Mountain Energy Solutions, was launched. The company also has a "Sun Club" where they donate solar and renewable energies to nonprofit organizations.

== See also ==
- Electric Reliability Council of Texas
- Brazos Wind Farm
- Green Mountain Wind Energy Center
