= Allegheny Ridge Wind Farm =

Wind farm in Pennsylvania, United States

Coordinates: 40.391404°N 78.540916°W

The Allegheny Ridge Wind Farm is Pennsylvania's largest operational wind farm. The wind farm was built by Gamesa and encompasses parts of Cambria and Blair counties north of Blue Knob Mountain near Altoona. It officially became operational in June 2007 and has 40 wind turbines, each of a 2 MW nameplate capacity, for a total maximum production of 80 megawatts of electricity. The wind farm is owned and operated by Infigen Energy and its electricity is sold to FirstEnergy.

== History ==
Mar 2006 - FirstEnergy Corp signs agreement to purchase power produced at the site.

Mar 2007 - An apparent defect in an adhesive applicator caused 13 wind turbine blades at the site to be damaged, with large pieces breaking off two blades. The investigation delayed the planned March-April startup of the wind turbines.

== See also ==
- Wind power in Pennsylvania
- Wind power in the United States
