= Locust Ridge Wind Farm =

Wind farm in Pennsylvania, United States

Coordinates: 40°42′36″N 76°13′11.9″W

The Locust Ridge Wind Farm is a large wind farm located near Mahanoy City in Schuylkill County, Pennsylvania, United States. The first phase, Locust Ridge I, has 13 Gamesa 2MW Wind Turbines that began commercial operation in 2006. The wind farm has a combined total nameplate capacity of 26 MW, producing about 68,328 megawatt-hours of electricity annually, which is enough to power 24,000 homes.

Construction of Locust Ridge II began in 2008 with the installation of 51 additional Gamesa 2MW wind turbines that are projected to produce 102 MW of electricity. The calculated yearly production of the wind farm is estimated to produce 372,300 megawatt-hours of electricity, enough to power 40,000 additional homes in Northeastern Pennsylvania. Seven of the 51 wind turbines are located in Conyngham Township, Columbia County and the remaining turbines are located in Schuylkill County. Locust Ridge II became operational in late 2008.

Nearly all of the large wind turbines from Locust Ridge I and II can be seen from Interstate 81 near Frackville, Pennsylvania.

== Funding ==
$295 Million in funding was given to Iberdrola in the first round of federal stimulus grants for renewable energy projects in September, 2009.

== See also ==
- Wind power in Pennsylvania
- Renewable energy in Schuylkill County
