= Plug-in electric vehicles in Pennsylvania =

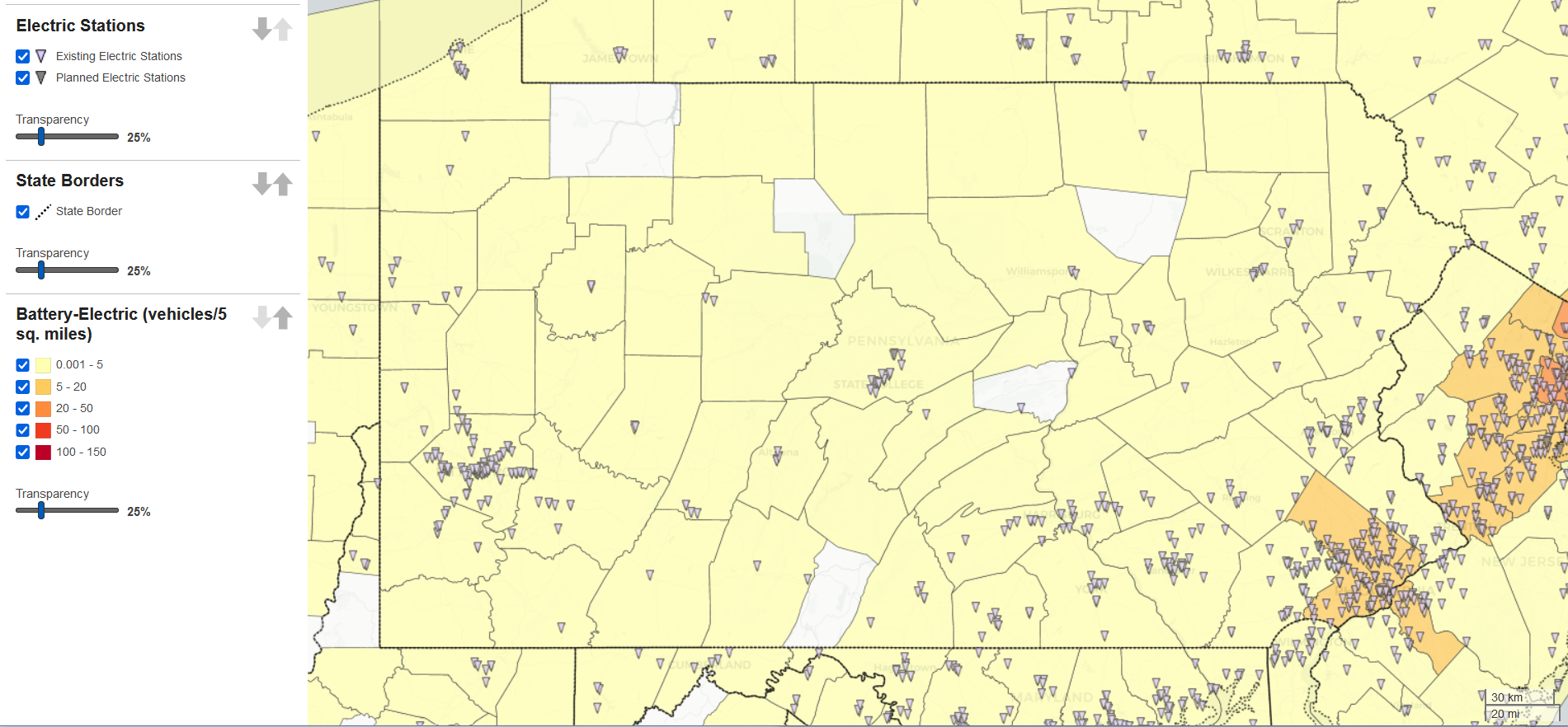
Map of charging stations and electric vehicle density in Pennsylvania

As of April 2022, there were about 23,000 electric vehicles registered in Pennsylvania.

== Government policy ==
As of 2021, the state government's official policy goal is to have 100% of all new vehicle sales be electric by 2035.

As of May 2022, Pennsylvania offers tax rebates of up to $1,000 for electric vehicle purchases.

As of 2021, electric vehicles are subject to a tax of $0.0172 per kilowatt-hour of electricity of used.

As of 2021, there were 64 electric vehicles in the state fleet.

== Charging stations ==
As of October 2022, there were 1,203 public charging stations in Pennsylvania.

The Infrastructure Investment and Jobs Act, signed into law in November 2021, allocates US$171.5 million to electric vehicle charging stations in Pennsylvania.

== Public opinion ==
A 2022 poll conducted by Centrist Democrats of America of Pennsylvania voters showed that 6% of respondents were "very likely" to purchase an electric vehicle in the next two to three years.

== By region ==
=== Erie ===
As of November 2020, there were 210 electric vehicles registered in Erie County.

=== Philadelphia ===
As of April 2022, there were 108 public charging stations in Philadelphia.

In 2022, EVgo announced a partnership with the city to support electrification of its entire municipal fleet.

=== Pittsburgh ===
In November 2021, the Allegheny County Police Department introduced an electric vehicle, becoming the first police department in Pennsylvania to do so.
