= Casselman Wind Power Project =

Wind farm in Pennsylvania, US

Coordinates: 39.884°N 79.153°W

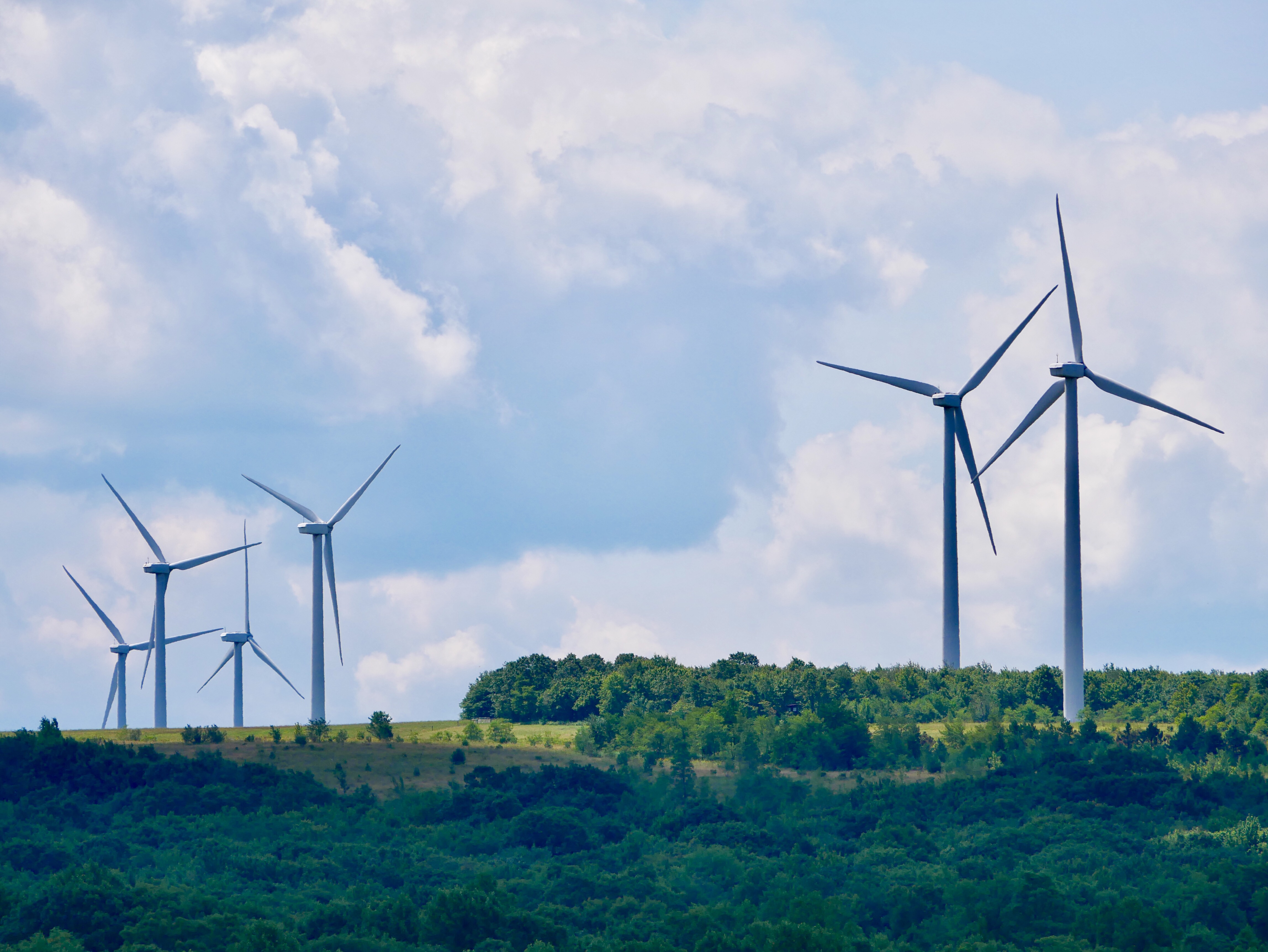
Turbines at the Casselman Wind Farm in Somerset County, Pennsylvania

The Casselman Wind Power Project is a wind farm in Somerset County, Pennsylvania, with 23 GE 1.5 MW Wind Turbines that began commercial operation in 2007. The wind farm has a combined total nameplate capacity of 34.5 megawatts, but actually produces about 90,666 megawatt-hours of electricity annually. The wind farm was developed by PPM Energy and constructed by Iberdrola, based in Spain. Power produced at the wind farm is distributed by First Energy.

Eight of the project's 23 wind turbines sit atop a rehabilitated surface mine. In addition, the former mining site also hosts the wind farm's operation center, collector transformer and interconnection facility.

== See also ==
- Wind power in Pennsylvania
