= Mill Run Wind Energy Center =

Wind farm in Fayette County, Pennsylvania

Coordinates: 39°56′58.05″N 79°26′34.61″W

The Mill Run Wind Energy Center is a wind farm located in Fayette County, Pennsylvania with ten 1.5 MW Enron Wind TZs that began commercial operation in November 2001. The wind farm has a combined total nameplate capacity of 15 MW, but actually produces about 39,420 megawatt-hours of electricity annually. The wind farm was developed by Atlantic Renewable Energy and Horizon Wind Energy, and constructed and operated by NextEra Energy Resources, based in Florida.

== See also ==
- Wind power in Pennsylvania
