= Solar power in Pennsylvania =

Overview of solar power in the U.S. state of Pennsylvania

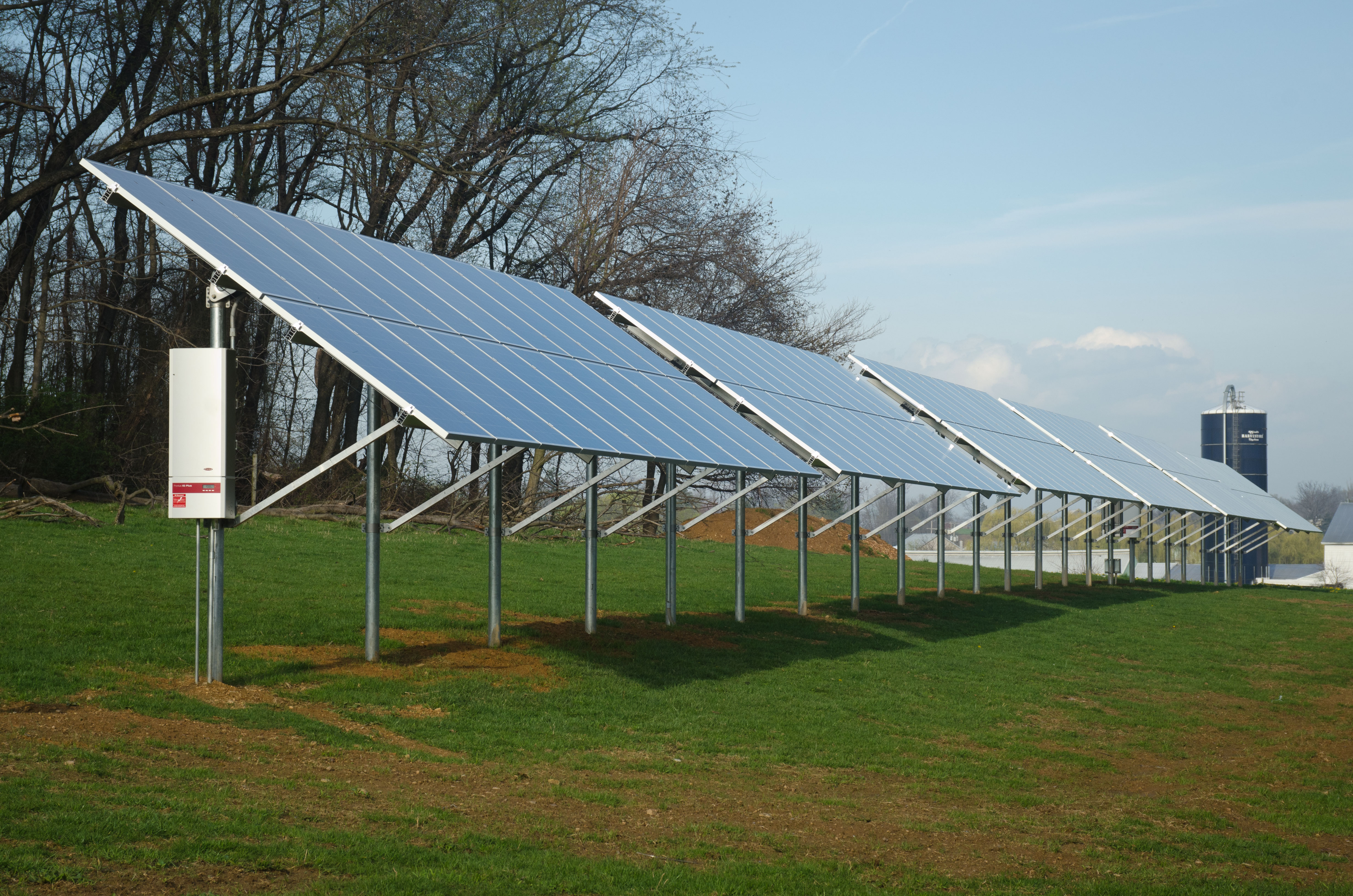
Solar panels in Myerstown

Solar power in Pennsylvania currently provides less than 1% of the state's electricity, but there are many policies in place to regulate and incentivize its use. Pennsylvania mandates the use of solar through a renewable portfolio standard, which requires a percentage of electricity from each providers to come from solar, and net metering, which compensates small-scale solar generation through net metering. By 2021, Pennsylvania was required to have 0.5% of its electricity from solar. The next goal is 10% by 2030. Solar power could theoretically provide over 30% of the state's electricity, but growth in solar generation has slowed due to a reduction in solar grants and the low price of solar energy credits. Efforts have also seen blowback from citizens, most notably from Mount Joy Township. Pennsylvania has ruled solar as a legal use, meaning local governments can only restrict size and placement, but cannot disband the projects.

== Solar power policies ==
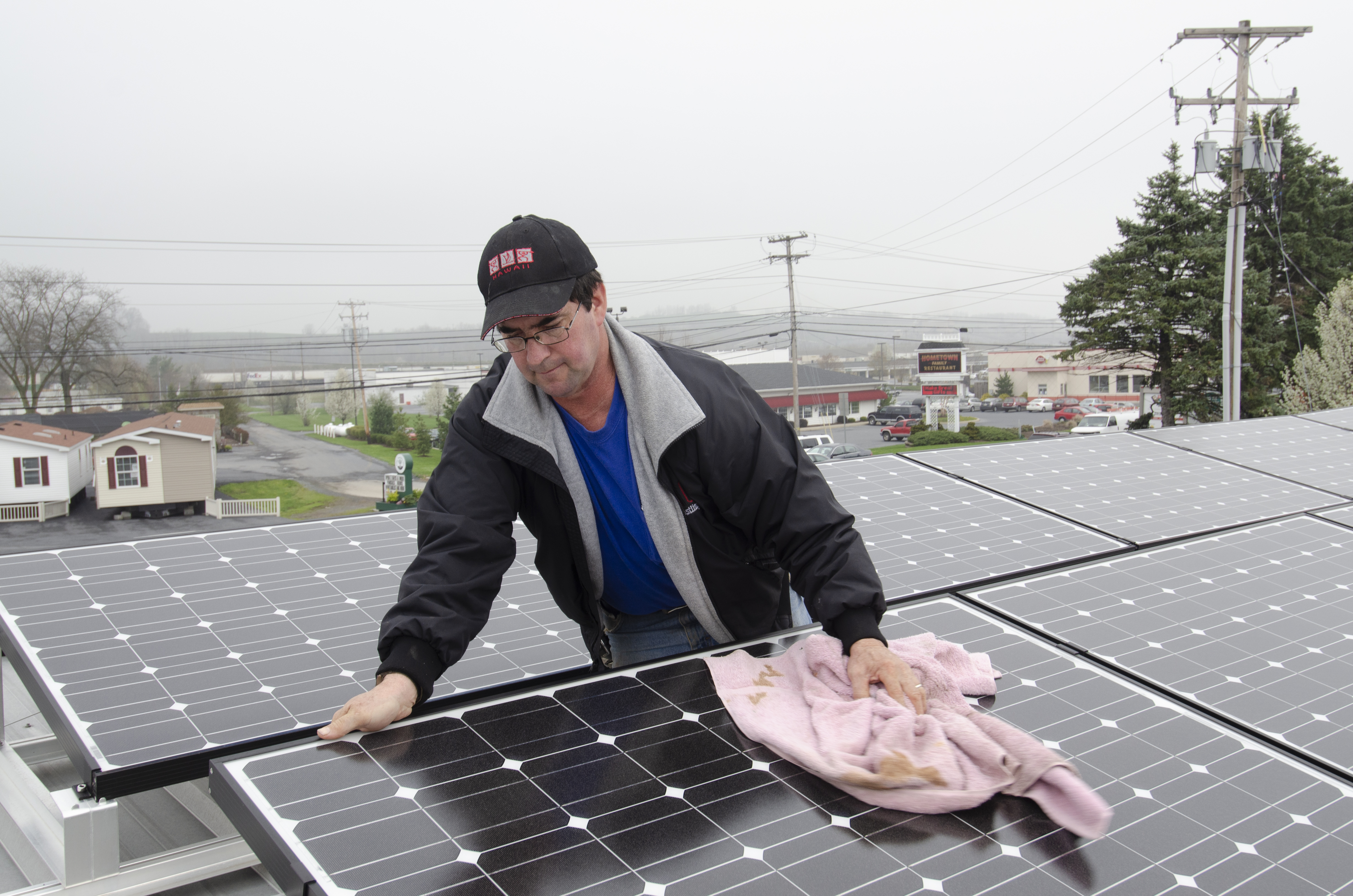
Cleaning solar panels, Palmyra

=== Net metering ===
Net metering is available to all residential customers up to 50 kW, and others up to at least 3 MW. Excess generation is credited at retail rate to customer's next bill, and paid annually at "price-to-compare" (normally referred to as "avoided cost"). Best practices call for no limits (other than to customer's service entrance rating), and perpetual rollover of kilowatt credits, instead of converting to a monetary credit. Annual reconciliation can create problems as annual generation for wind and solar inherently varies from year to year, and during the year large credit surpluses can accrue that would be later consumed, which is why perpetual rollover of kilowatt credits is recommended. Converting to a monetary credit is not recommended because electric rates change over time. In the event that the generation installed is larger than needed to meet local demand, an optional compensation is more practical than a mandatory method, even if the compensation is at retail.

=== Alternative Energy Portfolio Standard ===
Pennsylvania has a renewable portfolio standard titled Alternative Energy Portfolio Standard (AEPS), which mandates use of solar photovoltaics (PV) for electricity. All electrical utilities in Pennsylvania must supply a percentage of their electricity from alternative sources, which fall into two tiers: Tier I, which includes biomass, wind, and geothermal; and Tier II, which includes waste coal, gasification (syngas), and utility-scale hydropower. Each tier has a separate standard; by 2021, 8% of generation must come from Tier I, and 10% must come from Tier II. Solar PV and solar thermal fall under Tier I, but the AEPS also contains a requirement that a percentage of Tier I electricity be generated specifically from solar PV – 0.5% by 2021.

To comply with the standard, Pennsylvania utilities must obtain Alternative Energy Credits (AECs), which are equal to one megawatt-hour (MWh) of energy generated from Tier I or Tier II sources. Surplus AECs can be bought and sold between utilities or stored for a maximum of two years before being used. Utilities that do not comply must pay an alternative compliance payment (ACP), which goes to the state's Sustainable Energy Funds. The ACP for solar PV is dependent on the cost of solar PV electricity (in 2016 it was $124.14), while for all other sources the ACP is set at $45.

== Pennsylvania solar energy market ==
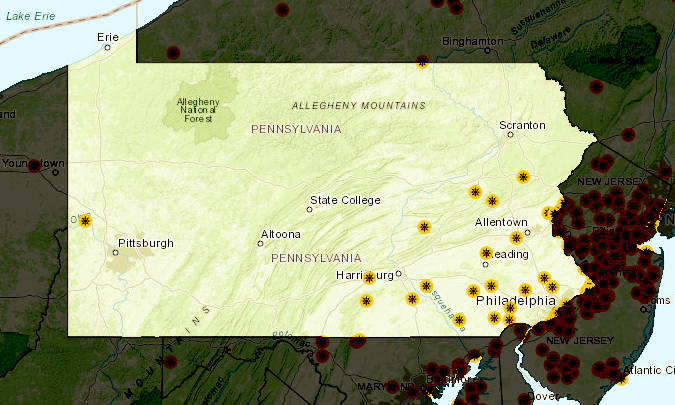
Map of Pennsylvania commercial solar power plants

Solar energy has failed to penetrate the Pennsylvania energy market to the extent that it has in other states due to in part to inconsistent financial incentives. In 2009, Pennsylvania created the PA Sunshine Rebate program, which allocated $100 million in state funds to offer rebates for small-scale solar installations. This program led to a short-term increase in the rate solar installations. Since then, the program has run out of funding and is no longer offering rebates, causing the number of new installations to drop. It has been replaced by the Solar Loan Program, which provides loans for building components for solar plants and for installing new solar generation. In addition, several Pennsylvania utilities offer grant, rebate, and loan programs for solar applications.

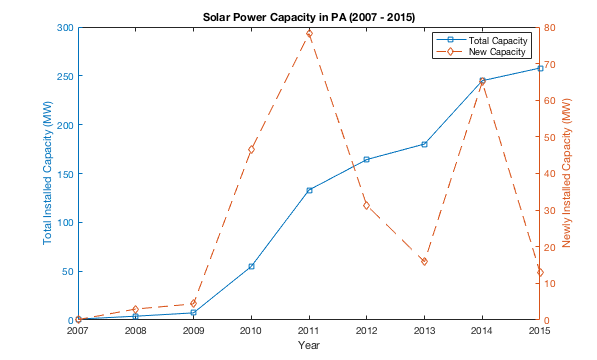
Total and newly installed solar capacity in Pennsylvania by year

Solar generation in Pennsylvania has also been made less financially attractive by low prices for solar alternative energy credits (SAECs). This is due to an oversupply of SAECs compared to what is required under the AEPS. Pennsylvania accepts SAECs from out-of-state solar generation within the PJM Interconnection, regardless of whether the state has a renewable portfolio standard. This allows Pennsylvania-based electrical providers to buy out-of-state SAECs cheaply rather than build new solar generation within the state. The influx of out-of-state credits causes the supply of SAECs to exceed the total number required for compliance, resulting in low prices for credits and a reduced incentive to construct solar power facilities in Pennsylvania.

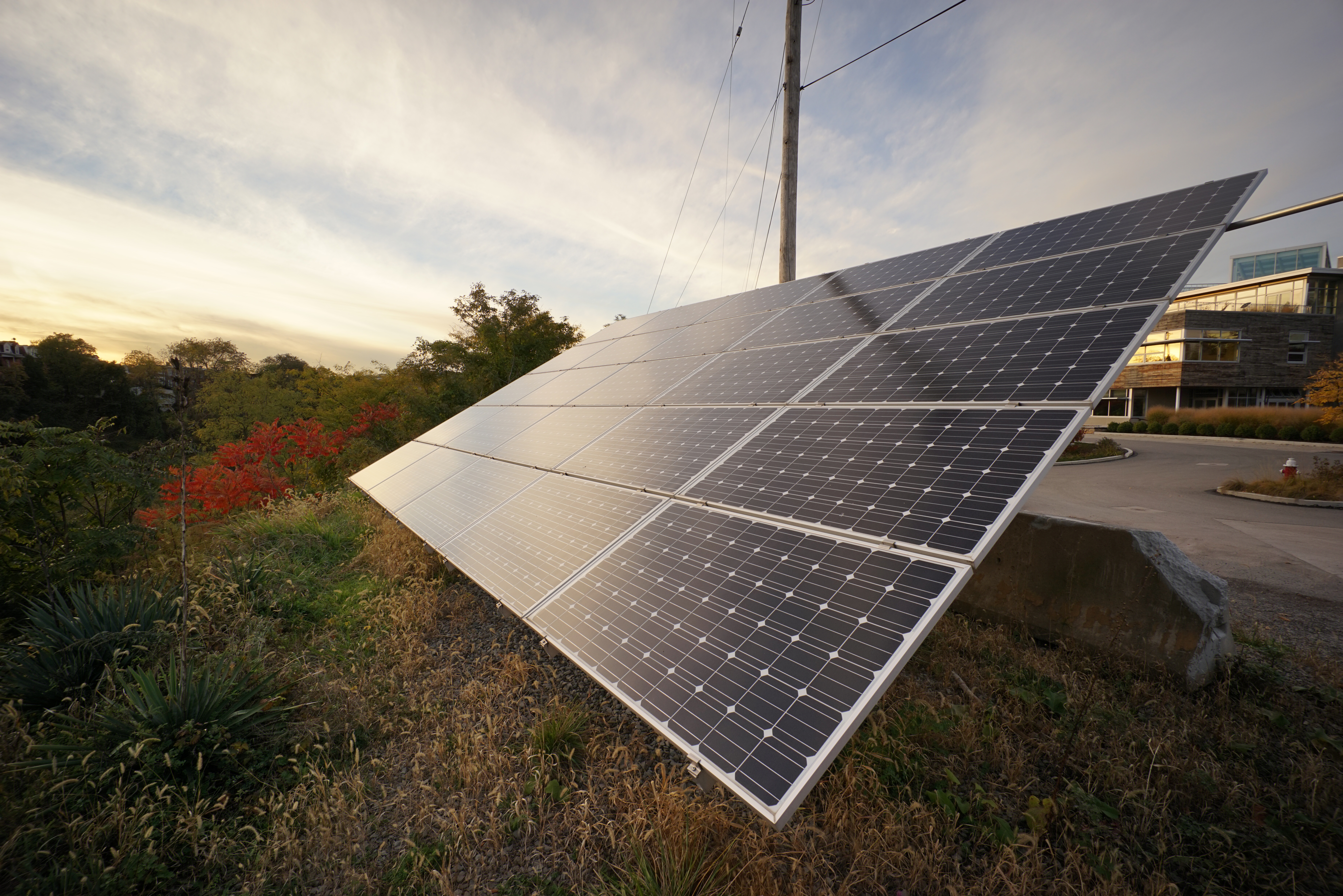
Solar panels at Phipps Conservatory

The average price of Pennsylvania SAECs peaked in 2010 at $310. Since the beginning of 2013, prices have fluctuated between $12 and $60. As of October 2017, the price has fallen to $3.50.

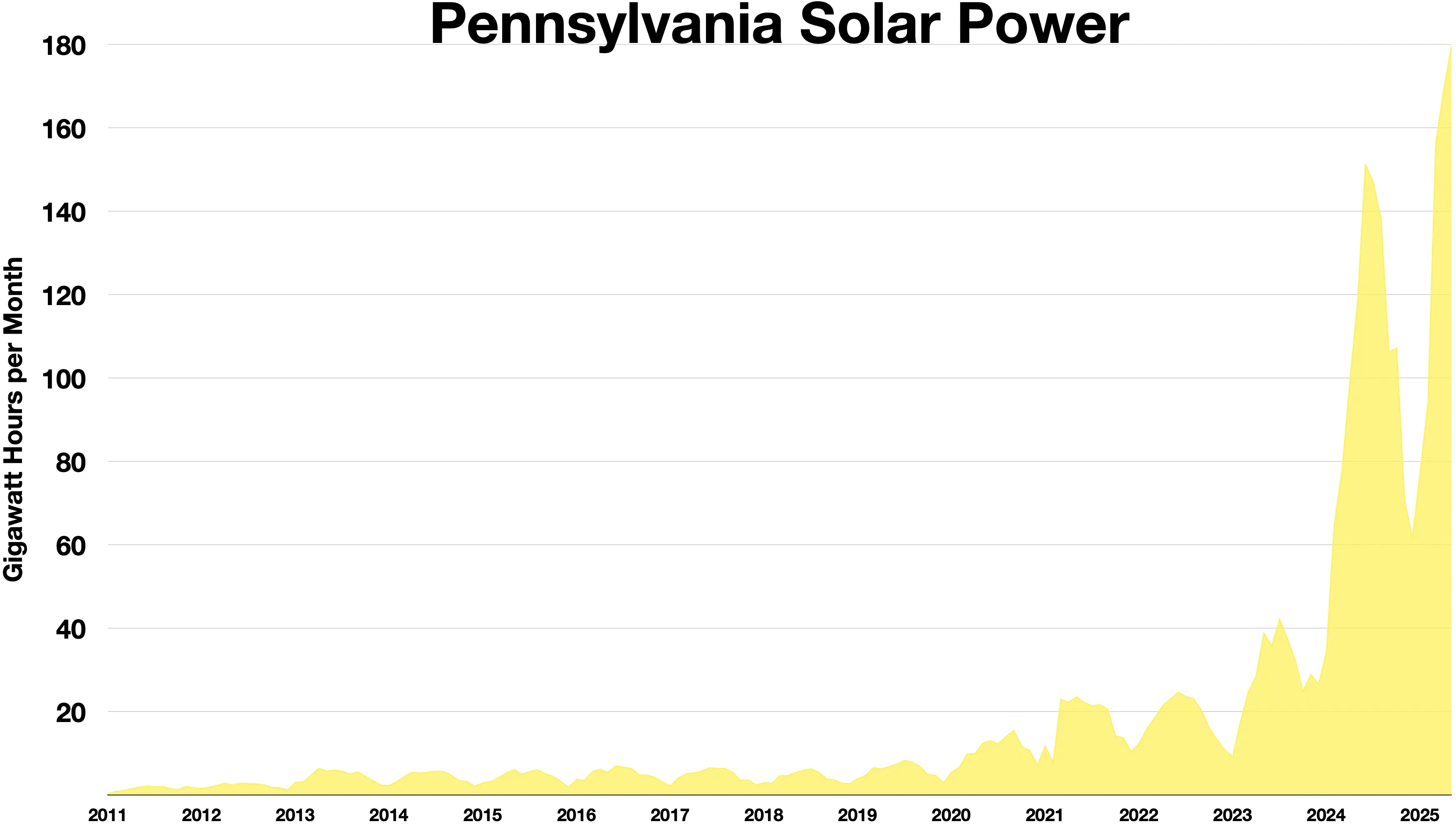
Pennsylvania solar power

The following table summarizes the growth of solar power capacity and generation in Pennsylvania.

Solar capacity and generation in Pennsylvania
Year	Total solar capacity (MW)	Newly installed capacity (MW)	Total electricity from solar (thousand MWh)	Percentage of electricity from solar	Percent solar in AEPS
2007	0.9	0.1	0	0.0126%	0.0013%
2008	3.9	3.0	0	0.0152%	0.0030%
2009	7.3	4.4	4	0.0193%	0.0063%
2010	54.8	46.5	8	0.0373%	0.0120%
2011	133.1	78.2	23	0.0671%	0.0203%
2012	164.3	31.3	32	0.0828%	0.0325%
2013	180.2	15.9	63	0.0915%	0.0510%
2014	245	65	62	0.142%	0.0840%
2015	258	13	64	0.151%	0.1440%
2016	300	42	75	0.168%	
2017	361	61	70	0.200%	
2018	420	59	62	0.22%	
2019	495	75	83	0.25%	
2020	761.6	266.6	186	0.31%	
2021	873.9	112.3		0.41%	
2022	1,036	162.1		0.43%	

Table key:

Total solar capacity: The U.S. Energy Information Administration (EIA) describes total solar capacity as the maximum output of electricity that a generator can produce under perfect conditions.

Newly installed capacity: Also referred to as the ICAP, this refers to the maximum capacity that the system is expected to run at. It is also referred to as "peak installed capacity".

The 2020 generation percentage number is up to the third quarter of 2020, and does not comprise the entire year.

== Outlook ==
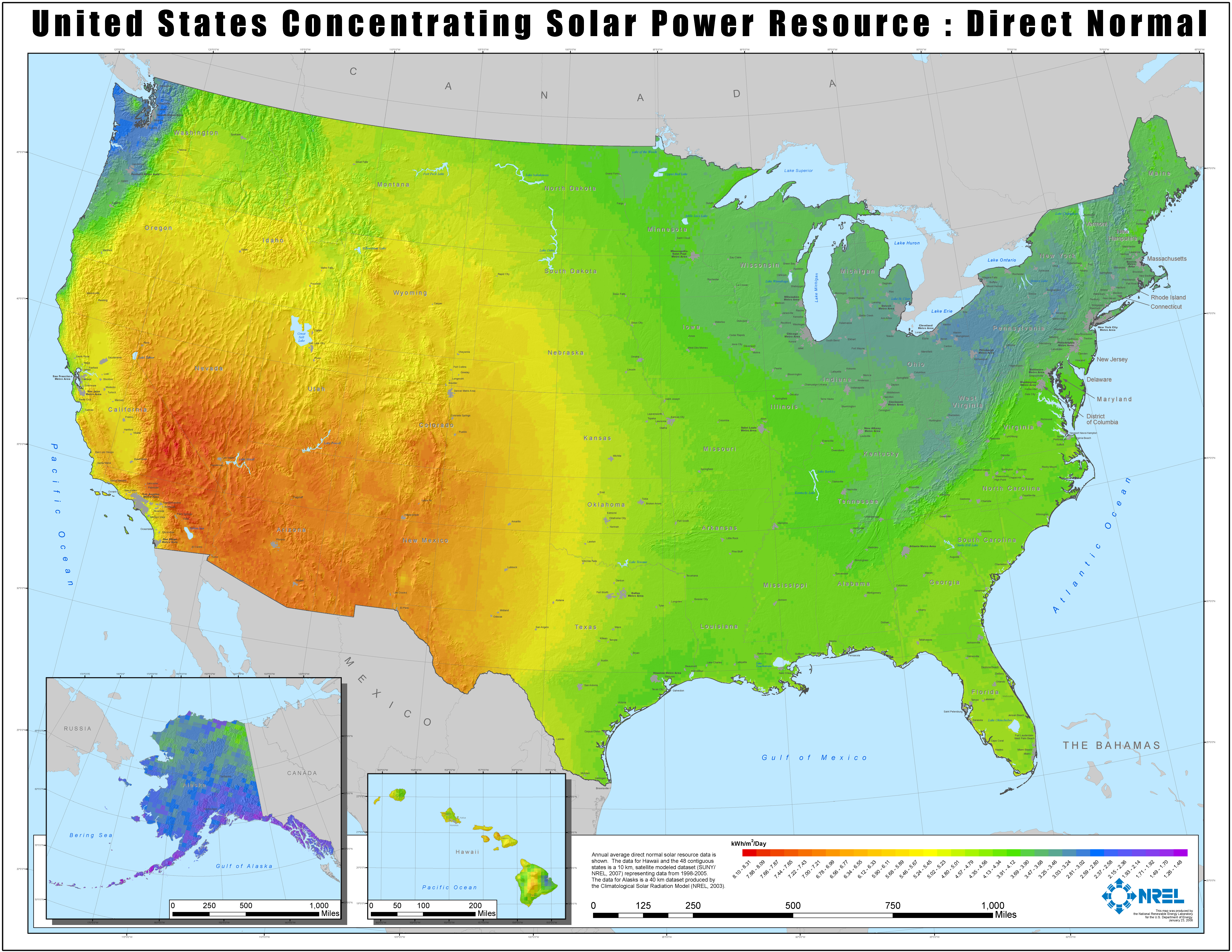
Average incoming solar radiation for the United States. Pennsylvania receives less than much of the country.

Solar power in Pennsylvania has potential for expansion, and could both reduce greenhouse gas emissions and improve public health, but growth is limited by the state's low sun exposure. If all usable rooftop space in Pennsylvania had photovoltaic panels installed, those panels would be capable of providing 34.5% of the state's electricity. Each kilowatt of installed solar capacity has a societal benefit of over $100 in parts of western and southeastern Pennsylvania, when combining environmental and public health benefits from emissions reductions. However, solar plants in Pennsylvania frequently have low capacity factors (ratio of power produced to maximum possible power), in large part due to low levels of incoming solar radiation. The state on average receives approximately 60% - 65% as much radiation as the southwest United States.

The requirements for solar generation stop increasing under the Pennsylvania AEPS in 2021, when it will remain at 0.5% going forward. Using funding from the U.S. Department of Energy, the state began a new program in 2017, Finding Pennsylvania's Solar Future, that aims to take input from stakeholders and produce new policy recommendations regarding solar power in the state. A preliminary goal is to increase the percentage of electricity sales coming from in-state solar to 10%, with a final goal and timeline for implementation to be determined.

In February 2022, Sheetz announced a long-term renewable supply agreement that would provide solar power for about 70% of its Pennsylvania facilities by 2024.

== See also ==
- List of power stations in Pennsylvania
- Wind power in Pennsylvania
- Solar power in the United States
- Renewable energy in the United States
