= Wind power in Pennsylvania =

Electricity from wind in one U.S. state

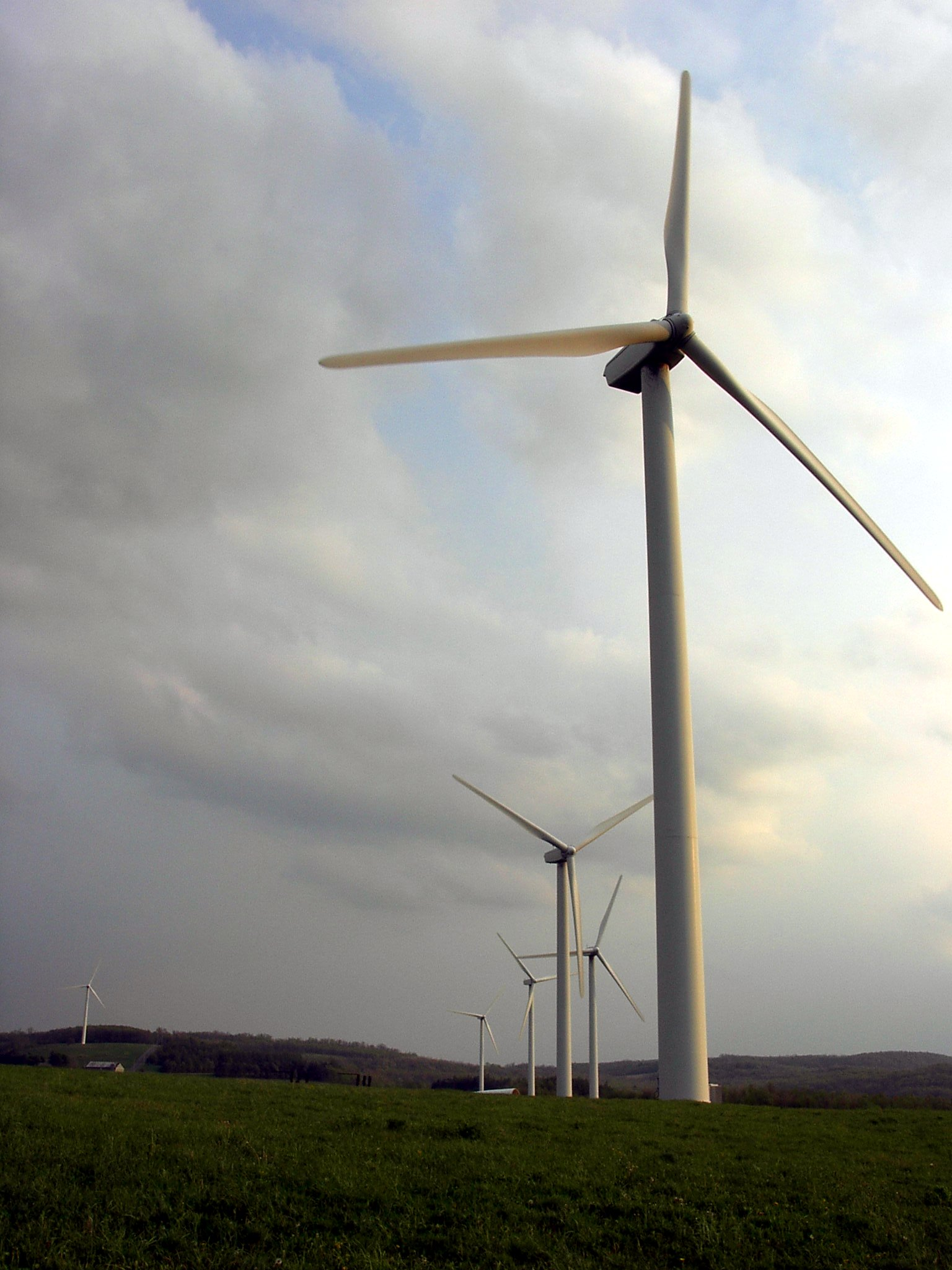
Turbines at the Somerset Wind Farm in Somerset County, Pennsylvania

In the U.S. state of Pennsylvania, wind power is one of the primary sources of renewable energy, and accounts for over one third of the state's renewable energy production. There are more than 27 wind farms currently operating in the Commonwealth of Pennsylvania. Theoretically, the energetic development of these wind farms could provide power for nearly 350,000 homes, or 1,300 megawatts. A majority of the farms are located in the southwest-central and northeastern regions of the state. Pennsylvania is an East Coast leader in wind energy due to its natural wind resources and governmental incentives brought on by the state. There is a lot of potential for growth within the wind power industry in Pennsylvania and the Northeast. Despite being one of the few landlocked states in the Mid-Atlantic region, Pennsylvania is close to several offshore sites along the coast of the Atlantic Ocean.

Wind power is environmentally friendly. It is efficient to create and sustain because it creates 31 times more energy than it requires during the manufacturing process and over its 20-year lifetime.

If all wind energy potential in Pennsylvania were developed with utility-scale wind turbines, the power produced each year would be enough to supply 6.4% of the state's current electricity consumption. In 2016, the state had 1369 megawatts (MW) of wind powered electricity generating capacity, responsible for 1.6% of in-state electricity production. This increased to 1459 MW in 2020.

== History ==
Several Southwestern Pennsylvania wind farms: Casselman (foreground), Meyersdale (near background), Twin Ridges (far background), and Lookout (near background towards end of video)

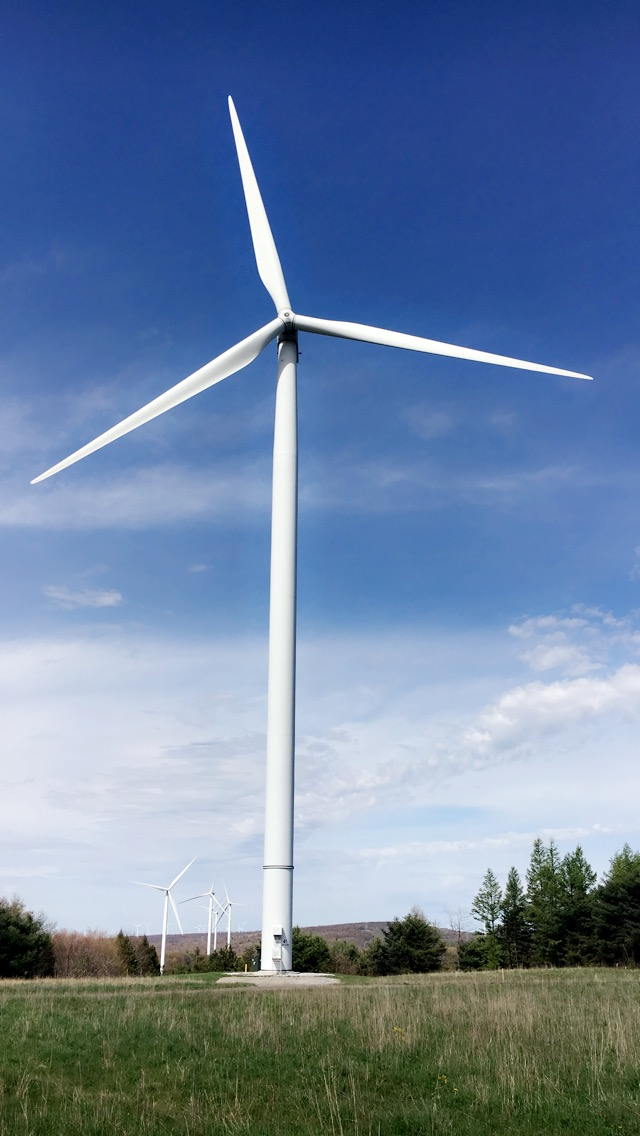
Turbines at the Highland North Wind Farm in Cambria County

In 2000, Pennsylvania's first commercial wind farm, the Green Mountain Wind Energy Center, was completed in Somerset County, but deactivated in 2015.

In 2006, the state legislature ruled that wind turbines and related equipment may not be included in property-tax assessments. Instead, the sites of wind facilities are assessed for their income-capitalization value.

In 2007, Montgomery County became the first wind-powered county in the nation, with a two-year commitment to buy 100 percent of its electricity from a combination of wind energy and renewable energy credits derived from wind energy.

Voluntary agreements with wind energy companies in Pennsylvania have been signed by The Pennsylvania Game Commission to avoid, minimize, and potentially mitigate any adverse impacts the development and production of wind energy may have on the state's wildlife resources.

Many smaller wind farms in Pennsylvania are operated by NextEra Energy Resources, based in Florida.

== Wind farms ==
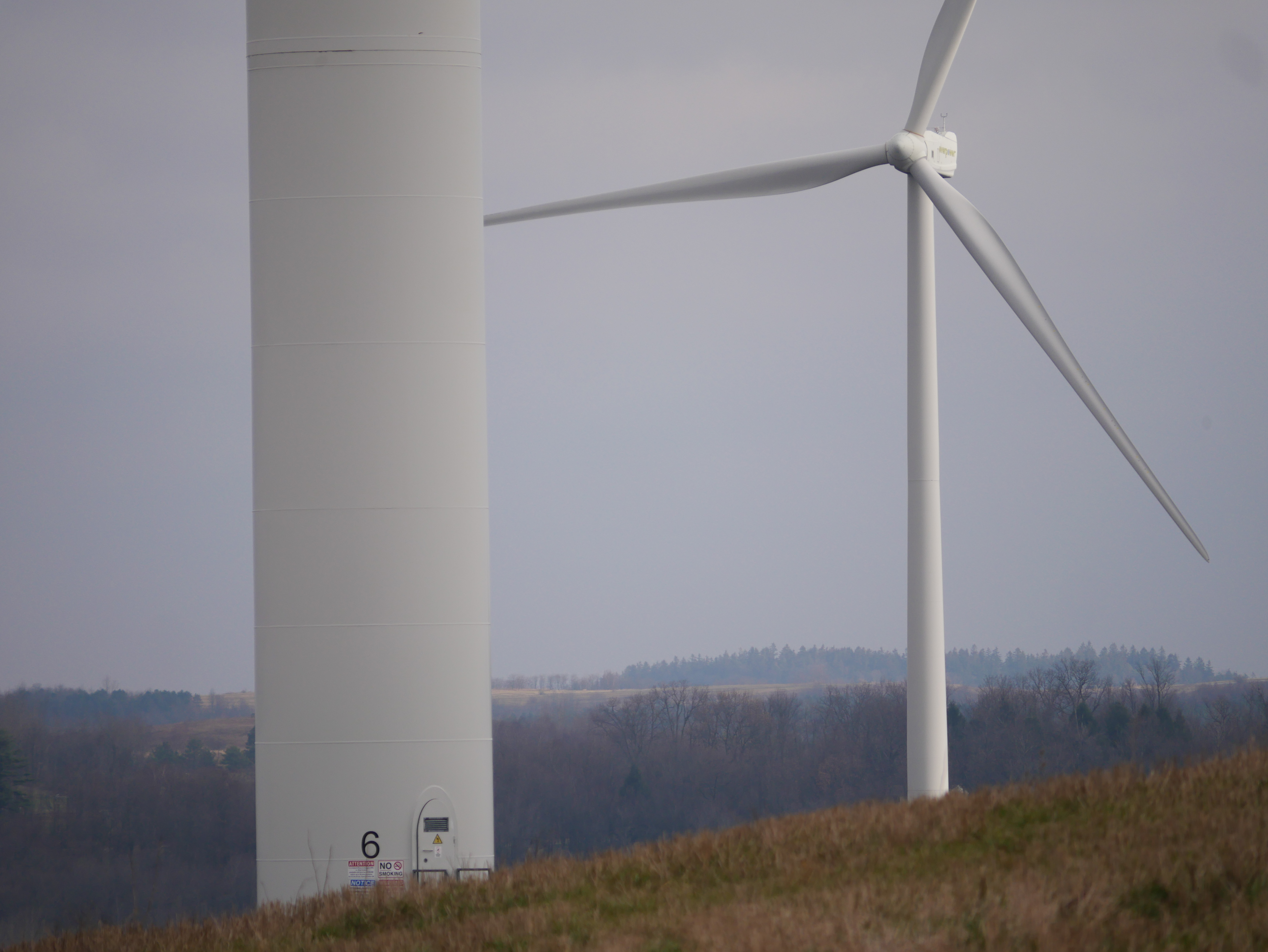
Patton Wind Farm

Wind farm	County	Number of turbines	Turbine capacity (MW)	Farm capacity (MW)
Somerset	Somerset	6	1.5	9.0
Mill Run	Fayette	10	1.5	15.0
Waymart	Wayne	43	1.5	64.5
Meyersdale	Somerset	20	1.5	30.0
Bear Creek	Luzerne	12	2.0	24.0
Locust Ridge I	Schuylkill	13	2.0	26.0
Allegheny Ridge	Cambria, Blair	40	2.0	80.0
Casselman	Somerset	23	1.5	34.5
Forward	Somerset	14	2.1	29.4
Lookout	Somerset	18	2.1	37.8
Locust Ridge II	Columbia, Schuylkill	51	2.0	102.0
Highland	Cambria	25	2.5	62.5
North Allegheny	Cambria, Blair	35	2.0	70
Armenia Mountain	Tioga, Bradford	67	1.5	100.5
Stony Creek	Somerset	35	1.5	52.5
Chestnut Flats	Blair	19	2.0	38
South Chestnut	Fayette	23	2.0	46
Turkey Point Wind Project (Frey Farm Wind)	Lancaster	2	1.6	3.2
Highland North	Cambria	30	2.5	75
Sandy Ridge	Blair, Centre	25	2.0	50
Twin Ridges	Somerset	68	2.05	139.4
Laurel Hill	Lycoming	30	2.3	69.0
Patton	Cambria	15	2.0	30
Mehoopany	Wyoming	88	1.6	140.8
Ringer Hill	Somerset	14	2.85	39.9
Big Level	Potter	25	3.6	90
Total		751		1459

== Location map ==
Wind power projects in Pennsylvania
Operating
Under construction

== Installed capacity and wind resources ==
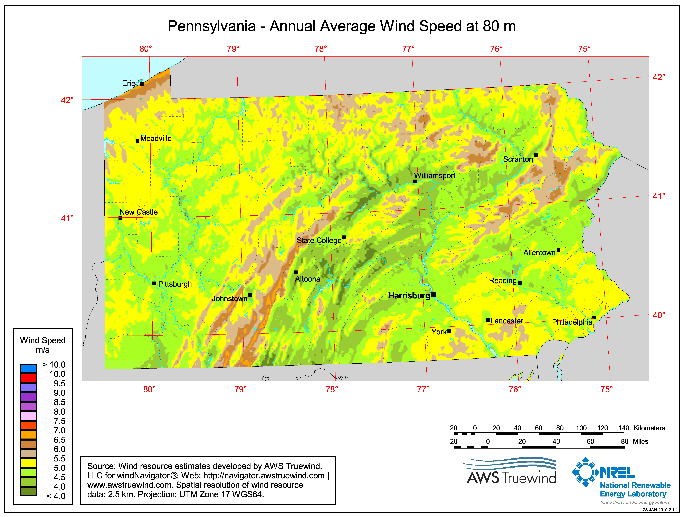
Pennsylvania 80-meter wind map

There have been advancements in both on and offshore wind power in Pennsylvania. At least 1300 MW of wind power is installed at the 27 wind farms in the state. According to the U.S. energy information administration, 1 MW of wind power can power about 650 average American homes.

Offshore wind power has been proposed on the state's limited shoreline on Lake Erie.

== Wind generation ==
Pennsylvania wind generation (GWh, million kWh)
Year	Total	Jan	Feb	Mar	Apr	May	Jun	Jul	Aug	Sep	Oct	Nov	Dec
2001	12	1	1	1	1	1	1	1	1	1	1	1	1
2002	59	9	5	7	6	5	3	3	2	3	4	7	5
2003	112	7	7	6	7	6	3	4	2	4	8	18	40
2004	307	41	29	31	32	21	16	14	12	17	24	30	40
2005	283	26	27	33	26	19	15	12	11	15	26	37	36
2006	360	37	38	39	31	27	19	19	18	22	37	27	46
2007	470	49	45	51	45	26	30	23	22	26	46	46	61
2008	727	77	60	69	59	65	40	27	30	35	69	87	109
2009	1,076	57	69	53	60	74	43	46	43	92	127	178	234
2010	1,966	224	190	176	151	128	116	77	73	132	186	179	222
2011	1,796	174	212	215	217	114	92	69	90	87	144	195	187
2012	2,129	252	194	207	209	107	150	106	76	120	206	207	294
2013	3,352	356	336	396	363	294	202	121	128	158	240	405	353
2014	3,536	403	332	402	398	227	158	175	161	178	354	397	351
2015	3,353	391	314	416	348	206	230	132	118	156	317	363	361
2016	3,476	412	387	355	274	184	215	155	149	179	338	370	458
2017	3,590	307	327	377	361	322	274	223	183	249	341	317	309
2018	3,566	412	386	292	334	288	219	206	200	221	330	341	337
2019	3,252	346	297	339	329	230	243	169	176	193	287	278	365
2020	3,748	387	331	381	374	341	203	151	180	213	306	437	444
2021	3,536	319	319	403	340	272	227	184	184	265	287	341	395
2022	3,767	363	373	400	369	310	247	209	182	235	315	400	364
2023	1,111	328	394	389									

Teal background indicates the largest wind generation month for the year.

Green background indicates the largest wind generation month to date.

== See also ==
- Solar power in Pennsylvania
- Wind power in the United States
- Renewable energy in the United States
