= Mill Run, Pocahontas County, West Virginia =

Mill Run, West Virginia
- Ghost town
- Location within West Virginia
- Coordinates: 38°06′19″N 80°13′18″W
- Country: United States
- State: West Virginia
- County: Pocahontas
- Elevation: 2,018 ft (615 m)
- GNIS feature ID: 1728114

Mill Run is a ghost town in Pocahontas County, West Virginia, United States. Mill Run was located on the Greenbrier River 2 miles (3.2 km) south-southwest of Hillsboro. Mill Run appeared on USGS maps as late as 1923.
