= Mill Run, Tucker County, West Virginia =

Mill Run, West Virginia
- Ghost town
- Location within West Virginia
- Coordinates: 39°00′53″N 79°32′48″W
- Country: United States
- State: West Virginia
- County: Tucker
- Elevation: 1,906 ft (581 m)
- GNIS feature ID: 1689383

Mill Run is a ghost town in Tucker County, West Virginia, United States. Mill Run was located on the Dry Fork 3 miles (4.8 km) northwest of Red Creek. Mill Run appeared on Soil Conservation Service maps as late as 1921.
