= National Register of Historic Places listings in Tucker County, West Virginia =

Location of Tucker County in West Virginia

This is a list of the National Register of Historic Places listings in Tucker County, West Virginia.

This is intended to be a complete list of the properties and districts on the National Register of Historic Places in Tucker County, West Virginia, United States. The locations of National Register properties and districts for which the latitude and longitude coordinates are included below, may be seen in an online map.

There are 11 properties and districts listed on the National Register in the county.

This National Park Service list is complete through NPS recent listings posted May 1, 2026.

Contents: Counties in West Virginia

Barbour - Berkeley - Boone - Braxton - Brooke - Cabell - Calhoun - Clay - Doddridge - Fayette - Gilmer - Grant - Greenbrier - Hampshire - Hancock - Hardy - Harrison - Jackson - Jefferson - Kanawha - Lewis - Lincoln - Logan - Marion - Marshall - Mason - McDowell - Mercer - Mineral - Mingo - Monongalia - Monroe - Morgan - Nicholas - Ohio - Pendleton - Pleasants - Pocahontas - Preston - Putnam - Raleigh - Randolph - Ritchie - Roane - Summers - Taylor - Tucker - Tyler - Upshur - Wayne - Webster - Wetzel - Wirt - Wood - Wyoming

== Current listings ==
	Name on the Register	Image	Date listed	Location	City or town	Description
1	Buxton and Landstreet Company Store		April 15, 2022 (#100007612)	571 Douglas Rd. 39°08′33″N 79°30′25″W	Thomas	
2	Cottrill Opera House	Cottrill Opera House	August 29, 1979 (#79002602)	East Ave. 39°09′01″N 79°29′53″W	Thomas	
3	Davis Coal and Coke Company Administrative Building	Davis Coal and Coke Company Administrative Building	October 6, 2011 (#11000733)	570 Douglas Rd. 39°08′33″N 79°30′12″W	Thomas	
4	Fairfax Stone Site	Fairfax Stone Site	January 26, 1970 (#70000653)	North of William at corner of Grant, Preston, and Tucker counties 39°11′42″N 79°29′16″W	Thomas	
5	Herman August Meyer House	Herman August Meyer House	July 15, 2010 (#09001195)	287 Thomas Ave. 39°07′49″N 79°27′48″W	Davis	
6	National Bank of Davis	National Bank of Davis	July 6, 2020 (#100005315)	417 William Ave. 39°07′44″N 79°27′54″W	Davis	
7	St. George Academy	St. George Academy	November 29, 2001 (#01001333)	County Road 1; 39°09′49″N 79°41′57″W	St. George	
8	Thomas Commercial Historic District	Thomas Commercial Historic District	August 14, 1998 (#98001072)	Roughly Spruce St. and East Ave. between First St. and Third St.; East Ave. west to the North Fork of the Blackwater River; 39°09′46″N 79°29′34″W	Thomas	
9	Tucker County Bank Building	Tucker County Bank Building	August 26, 2010 (#10000579)	1000 Walnut St. 39°05′49″N 79°40′47″W	Parsons	
10	Tucker County Courthouse and Jail	Tucker County Courthouse and Jail	August 23, 1984 (#84003680)	1st and Walnut Sts. 39°05′49″N 79°40′51″W	Parsons	
11	Western Maryland Depot	Western Maryland Depot	May 2, 1996 (#96000444)	166½ Main St. 39°05′44″N 79°40′50″W	Parsons	

== See also ==
- List of National Historic Landmarks in West Virginia
- National Register of Historic Places listings in West Virginia
