= White Grass Ski Touring Center =

Coordinates: 39°01′08″N 79°25′16″W

White Grass Ski Touring Center is a cross-country skiing facility located in Canaan Valley in Tucker County, West Virginia. It originally opened in 1979 on White Grass Knob near Harrisonburg, Virginia. Two years later, the operation was moved to the site of the second Weiss Knob Ski Area. The resort uses Weiss Knob's former lodge as its day lodge; it is one of the oldest dedicated cross country ski areas in the United States. Because of its status as a former downhill slope, White Grass is an unusually steep cross country area, with nearly 1,200 feet (370 m) of vertical rise—more than at neighboring downhill slope Canaan Valley Resort State Park. Its 45 trails are rated approximately 30% easy, 55% intermediate, 15% most difficult; climbs are available to the summit of 4,436-foot (1,352 m) Weiss Knob by intermediate skiing, and to 4,308-foot (1,313 m) Bald Knob via easier or intermediate trails. White Grass staff also conduct free natural history snowshoe tours each Sunday into the Canaan Valley Fish and Wildlife Refuge.

The resort's trails stretch along the northern slope of Cabin Mountain from Canaan Valley Resort northeast to Timberline Four Seasons Resort. It also provides access to Dolly Sods wilderness area on the east, and to trails in Canaan Valley National Wildlife Refuge on the west. There are more than 50 kilometres (31 mi) of cross-country trails on White Grass property, and more than 100 kilometres (62 mi) of trails are locally accessible. Half of the established trails at White Grass are machine groomed. The resort harvests its 150 inches (3.8 m) of natural snowfall with 5 kilometres (3.1 mi) of snow fences. The resort supports snowshoeing and telemark skiing as well as moonlight tours once a month.

White Grass has been described as catering to a "fleece-and-flannel scene". During the summer, it is the site of a 500-acre (2.0 km^{2}) cattle farm. The resort's natural foods cafe has become a popular attraction, publishing two novelty cookbooks. White Grass was voted the most popular ski center in North America winter of 2017 by a USA Today survey. As of 2004 the resort lodge consumed less than $2 worth of electricity per day, and was heated by a wood-burning stove. In 2003 the resort was recognized by the West Virginia Environmental Council for the environmental sustainability of its operations, such as its snow farming. In 1994 The Washington Post cited White Grass Touring Center as one of the ten best Nordic ski areas in the nation.

== See also ==
- Canaan Valley
- Canaan Valley Resort State Park
