= Western Maryland Railway Station =

Western Maryland Railway Station, or W. M. Depot or W. M. Railroad Right-of-Way, may refer to:

- Western Maryland Railway Station (Cumberland, Maryland), listed on the NRHP in Maryland
- Western Maryland Railway Station (Hagerstown, Maryland), listed on the NRHP in Maryland
- Western Maryland Depot (Parsons, West Virginia), listed on the NRHP in West Virginia
- Western Maryland Railroad Right-of-Way, Milepost 126 to Milepost 160, North Branch, MD, Woodmont, MD, and Jerome, WV, listed on the NRHP in Maryland and West Virginia

== See also ==
- Western Maryland Railway Steam Locomotive No. 202, Hagerstown, MD, listed on the NRHP in Maryland
