= Davis, West Virginia =

- Town
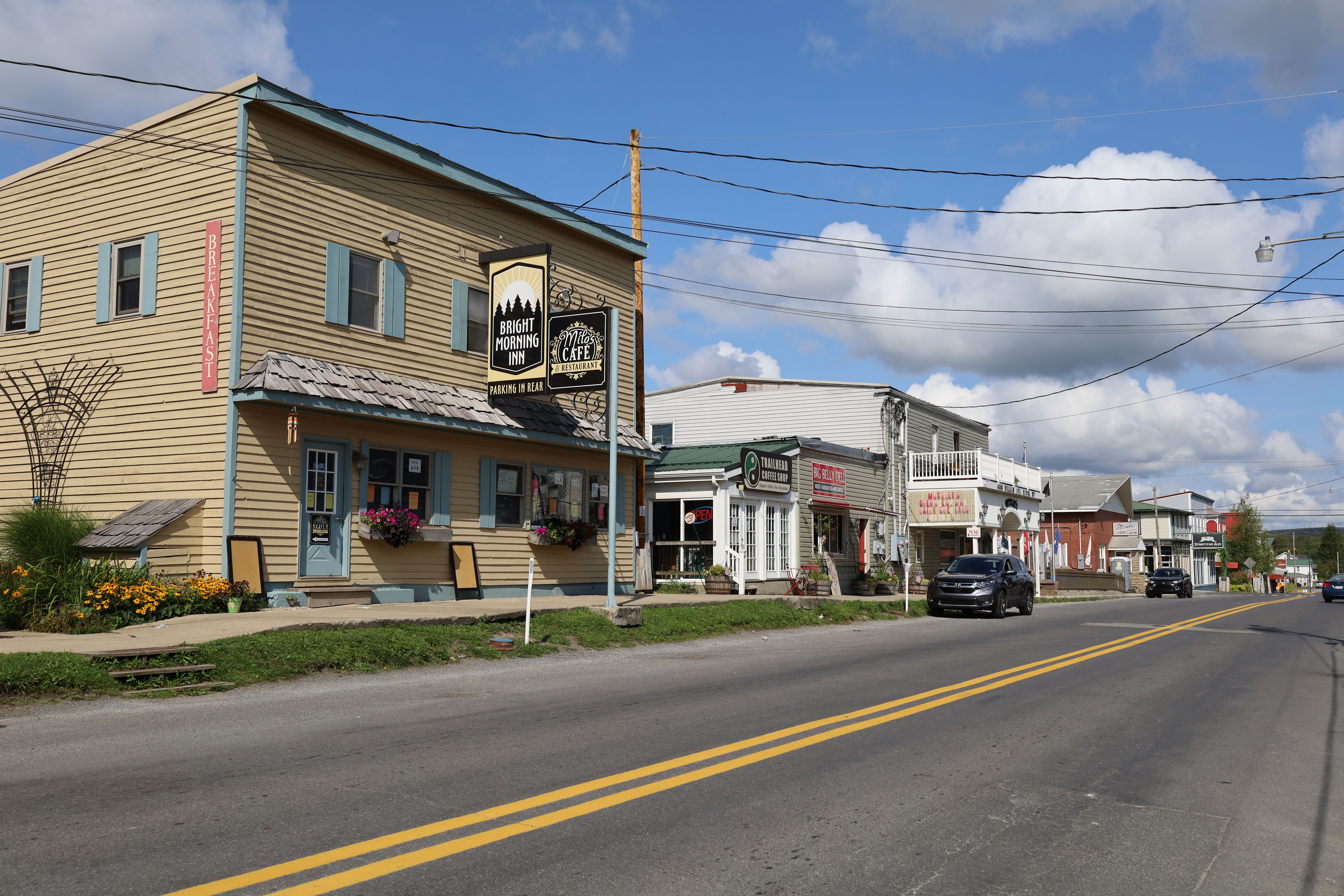
- William Avenue (Route 32) in Davis in 2020

- Seal Wordmark

- Location of Davis in Tucker County, West Virginia
- Coordinates: 39°7′52″N 79°27′59″W
- Country: United States
- State: West Virginia
- County: Tucker
- Incorporated: 1889

Area
  - Total: 1.83 sq mi (4.74 km^{2})
  - Land: 1.83 sq mi (4.74 km^{2})
  - Water: 0 sq mi (0.00 km^{2})
- Elevation: 3,100 ft (945 m)

Population (2020)
  - Total: 600
  - Estimate (2021): 588
  - Density: 344.6/sq mi (133.06/km^{2})
- Time zone: UTC-5 (Eastern (EST))
  - Summer (DST): UTC-4 (EDT)
- ZIP code: 26260
- Area code: 304
- FIPS code: 54-20428
- GNIS feature ID: 1550876
- Website: https://daviswv.us/

Davis is a town in Tucker County, West Virginia, United States, situated along the Blackwater River. The population was 595 at the 2020 census.

== History ==
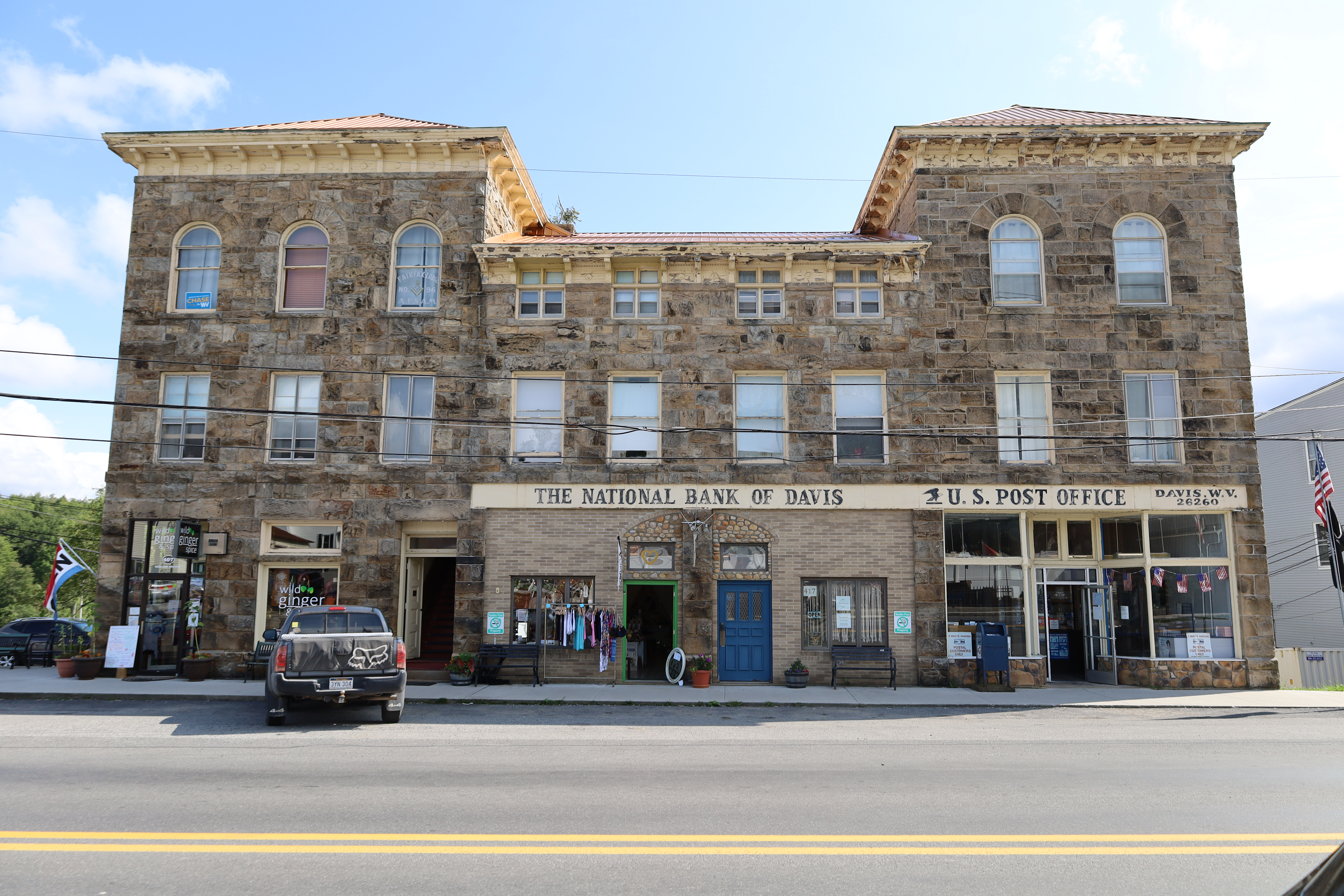
NRHP-listed National Bank of Davis in 2020

Davis was named either for Senator Henry Gassaway Davis, or for his family generally.

The Herman August Meyer House was listed on the National Register of Historic Places in 2010.

The Potomac Valley Transit Authority has served Davis since January 29, 2026. An 785-megawatt 291-acre (1,180,000 m^{2}) AI data center is planned to be developed in Davis and in nearby Thomas with plans to expand 10,000 acres (40,000,000 m^{2}). The data center was criticized for its light, water, and air pollution.

== Geography ==
Davis is located at 39°07′52″N 79°27′59″W (39.131110, -79.466318). It is located in the northern portion of Canaan Valley, West Virginia near the Canaan Valley State Resort Park, and is partially surrounded by the Monongahela National Forest, including scenic Blackwater Falls.

At an elevation of 3,520 feet, Davis has the highest elevation of any West Virginia town. According to the United States Census Bureau, the town has a total area of 1.83 square miles (4.74 km^{2}), all land.

== Outdoor Activities ==
=== Mountain Biking ===
The area surrounding Davis is renowned for its mountain biking trails and bike culture. The most notable trails include the Plantation Trail, Hoo Doo Hustle and Moon Rocks. Many more miles of trails are also easily accessible at nearby Blackwater Falls State Park. The area also hosts several mountain bike races each year. One of these races, the Revenge of the Rattlesnake, is considered one of the toughest bike races in the country.

=== Nordic Skiing ===
Davis is also home to the White Grass Ski Touring Center. Originally opened in 1959 as the Weiss Knob Ski Area, a downhill ski resort, the site was reopened in 1979 as White Grass, with a focus on cross-country skiing. Today, White Grass maintains over 50 kilometers of groomed trails each winter.

== Demographics ==
Historical population
Census	Pop.	Note	%±
1890	918		—
1900	2,391		160.5%
1910	2,615		9.4%
1920	2,491		−4.7%
1930	1,656		−33.5%
1940	1,454		−12.2%
1950	1,271		−12.6%
1960	898		−29.3%
1970	868		−3.3%
1980	979		12.8%
1990	799		−18.4%
2000	624		−21.9%
2010	660		5.8%
2020	600		−9.1%
2021 (est.)	588	▼	−2.0%
U.S. Decennial Census

=== 2010 census ===
At the 2010 census there were 660 people, 305 households, and 173 families living in the town. The population density was 360.7 inhabitants per square mile (139.3/km^{2}). There were 425 housing units at an average density of 232.2 units per square mile (89.7 units/km^{2}). The racial makeup of the town was 98.0% White, 0.5% Native American, 0.5% from other races, and 1.1% from two or more races. Hispanic or Latino people of any race were 0.9%.

Of the 305 households 20.0% had children under the age of 18 living with them, 43.6% were married couples living together, 9.2% had a female householder with no husband present, 3.9% had a male householder with no wife present, and 43.3% were non-families. 37.4% of households were one person and 15.4% were one person aged 65 or older. The average household size was 2.16 and the average family size was 2.82.

The median age in the town was 46.1 years. 17.7% of residents were under the age of 18; 6.8% were between the ages of 18 and 24; 24.1% were from 25 to 44; 34.9% were from 45 to 64; and 16.5% were 65 or older. The gender makeup of the town was 47.0% male and 53.0% female.

=== 2000 census ===
At the 2000 census there were 624 people, 290 households, and 176 families living in the town. The population density was 546.0 inhabitants per square mile (210.8 inhabitants/km^{2}). There were 380 housing units at an average density of 332.5 units per square mile (128.4 units/km^{2}). The racial makeup of the town was 97.92% White, 0.16% Native American, and 1.92% from two or more races. Hispanic or Latino people of any race were 0.32%.

Of the 290 households 26.2% had children under the age of 18 living with them, 44.5% were married couples living together, 11.7% had a female householder with no husband present, and 39.3% were non-families. 36.9% of households were one person and 20.0% were one person aged 65 or older. The average household size was 2.15 and the average family size was 2.76.

The age distribution was 22.0% under the age of 18, 6.1% from 18 to 24, 26.6% from 25 to 44, 23.4% from 45 to 64, and 22.0% 65 or older. The median age was 42 years. For every 100 females, there were 84.6 males. For every 100 females age 18 and over, there were 88.0 males.

The median household income was $25,221 and the median family income was $31,333. Males had a median income of $21,607 versus $17,250 for females. The per capita income for the town was $22,399. About 14.6% of families and 14.6% of the population were below the poverty line, including 19.4% of those under age 18 and 10.9% of those age 65 or over.

== Climate ==
According to the Köppen Climate Classification system, Davis has a warm-summer humid continental climate, abbreviated "Dfb" on climate maps. The climate is very snowy due to the high elevation and rugged terrain.

Climate data for Davis, West Virginia, 1991–2020 normals, extremes 2002–present
Month	Jan	Feb	Mar	Apr	May	Jun	Jul	Aug	Sep	Oct	Nov	Dec	Year
Record high °F (°C)	62 (17)	71 (22)	74 (23)	84 (29)	83 (28)	89 (32)	89 (32)	84 (29)	84 (29)	80 (27)	72 (22)	64 (18)	89 (32)
Mean maximum °F (°C)	55.5 (13.1)	56.1 (13.4)	66.4 (19.1)	76.7 (24.8)	79.9 (26.6)	81.9 (27.7)	83.3 (28.5)	81.1 (27.3)	80.5 (26.9)	74.7 (23.7)	67.3 (19.6)	58.1 (14.5)	84.3 (29.1)
Mean daily maximum °F (°C)	31.9 (−0.1)	34.9 (1.6)	42.9 (6.1)	55.8 (13.2)	64.4 (18.0)	71.5 (21.9)	75.3 (24.1)	73.6 (23.1)	68.1 (20.1)	57.3 (14.1)	45.7 (7.6)	36.4 (2.4)	54.8 (12.7)
Daily mean °F (°C)	23.9 (−4.5)	26.2 (−3.2)	33.5 (0.8)	45.0 (7.2)	54.6 (12.6)	62.2 (16.8)	66.0 (18.9)	64.4 (18.0)	58.8 (14.9)	47.8 (8.8)	37.2 (2.9)	28.8 (−1.8)	45.7 (7.6)
Mean daily minimum °F (°C)	15.9 (−8.9)	17.5 (−8.1)	24.0 (−4.4)	34.3 (1.3)	44.9 (7.2)	52.8 (11.6)	56.6 (13.7)	55.2 (12.9)	49.5 (9.7)	38.4 (3.6)	28.7 (−1.8)	21.2 (−6.0)	36.6 (2.6)
Mean minimum °F (°C)	−5.6 (−20.9)	−4.8 (−20.4)	4.4 (−15.3)	18.3 (−7.6)	28.9 (−1.7)	39.8 (4.3)	46.1 (7.8)	45.7 (7.6)	37.9 (3.3)	24.3 (−4.3)	12.1 (−11.1)	3.8 (−15.7)	−8.6 (−22.6)
Record low °F (°C)	−18 (−28)	−15 (−26)	−9 (−23)	5 (−15)	19 (−7)	32 (0)	40 (4)	41 (5)	32 (0)	20 (−7)	0 (−18)	−15 (−26)	−18 (−28)
Average precipitation inches (mm)	6.20 (157)	5.28 (134)	5.90 (150)	5.31 (135)	5.70 (145)	6.21 (158)	6.27 (159)	4.49 (114)	4.07 (103)	4.09 (104)	4.12 (105)	5.52 (140)	63.16 (1,604)
Average snowfall inches (cm)	45.0 (114)	43.1 (109)	26.0 (66)	10.6 (27)	0.5 (1.3)	0.0 (0.0)	0.0 (0.0)	0.0 (0.0)	0.0 (0.0)	5.5 (14)	11.2 (28)	28.3 (72)	170.2 (431.3)
Average extreme snow depth inches (cm)	15.7 (40)	17.9 (45)	13.9 (35)	5.7 (14)	0.3 (0.76)	0.0 (0.0)	0.0 (0.0)	0.0 (0.0)	0.0 (0.0)	4.7 (12)	7.0 (18)	9.9 (25)	20.6 (52)
Average precipitation days (≥ 0.01 in)	22.6	19.8	18.2	16.3	17.4	15.3	15.2	13.9	10.9	14.2	14.3	19.5	197.6
Average snowy days (≥ 0.1 in)	16.4	14.8	9.7	3.7	0.6	0.0	0.0	0.0	0.0	1.6	5.8	12.1	64.7
Source 1: NOAA
Source 2: National Weather Service (mean maxima/minima, snow depth 2006–2020)

== Notable people ==
- Eddie Baker, film actor
- Karl Lashley, psychologist
- Frankie Yankovic, known as "America's Polka King"
