= National Bank of Davis =

- U.S. National Register of Historic Places
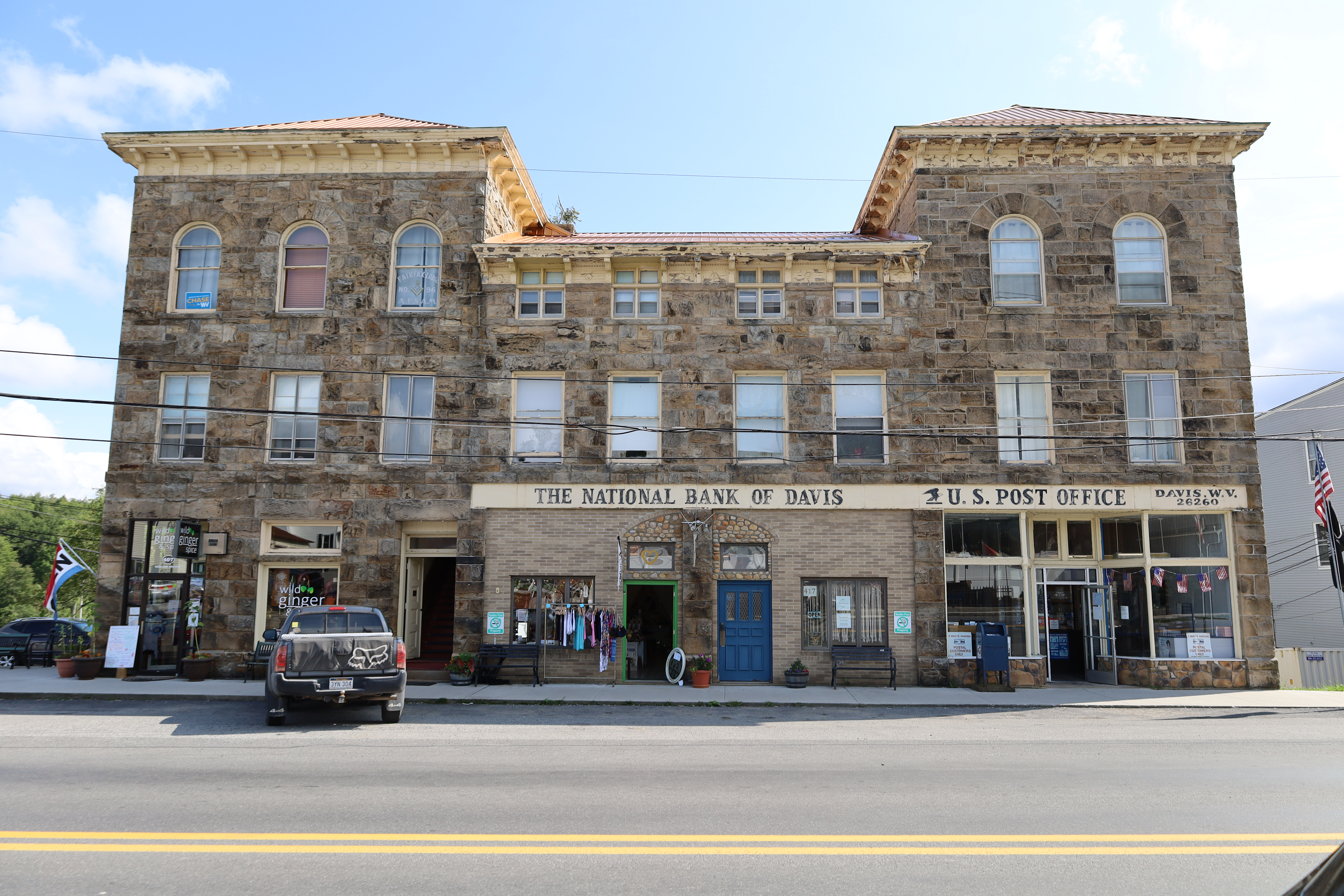
- The National Bank of Davis in 2020

- Location within West Virginia Location within the United States
- Location: 417 William Ave, Davis, West Virginia 26260
- Coordinates: 39°07′44″N 79°27′54″W
- Built: 1892
- Architectural style: Romanesque Architecture
- NRHP reference No.: 100005315
- Added to NRHP: July 6, 2020

The National Bank of Davis is a historic bank located in Davis in Tucker County, West Virginia. The bank was listed on the National Register of Historic Places in 2020.

== History ==
Constructed in two stages in 1892 and 1915, the National Bank of Davis is a nine-bay Richardsonian Romanesque commercial building characterized by its random ashlar sandstone exterior and bracketed eaves with a decorative frieze beneath a hipped roof. Although built over two decades, the structure maintains a cohesive exterior appearance, with construction differences most evident in the interior and rear elevations.

Architectural features typical of the style include double-hung wood windows set within half-round arches on the first and third stories, stone sills and headers, and a combination roof form consisting of hipped sections connected by a side-gabled hyphen. The roof, now clad in copper-painted standing seam metal, rests on prominent wooden brackets. The primary storefront along William Avenue retains much of its historic fabric despite later alterations, including a continuous metal sign panel identifying the building as “The National Bank of Davis” and “U.S. Post Office, Davis, W.V. 26256.” The interior preserves significant original materials such as pressed tin ceilings, casework, millwork, and a historic bank vault, reflecting the building's longstanding role in the commercial and civic life of the community.

== See also ==
- National Register of Historic Places listings in Tucker County, West Virginia
