= Canaan Valley Resort State Park =

State park in West Virginia, United States

- IUCN category III (natural monument or feature)
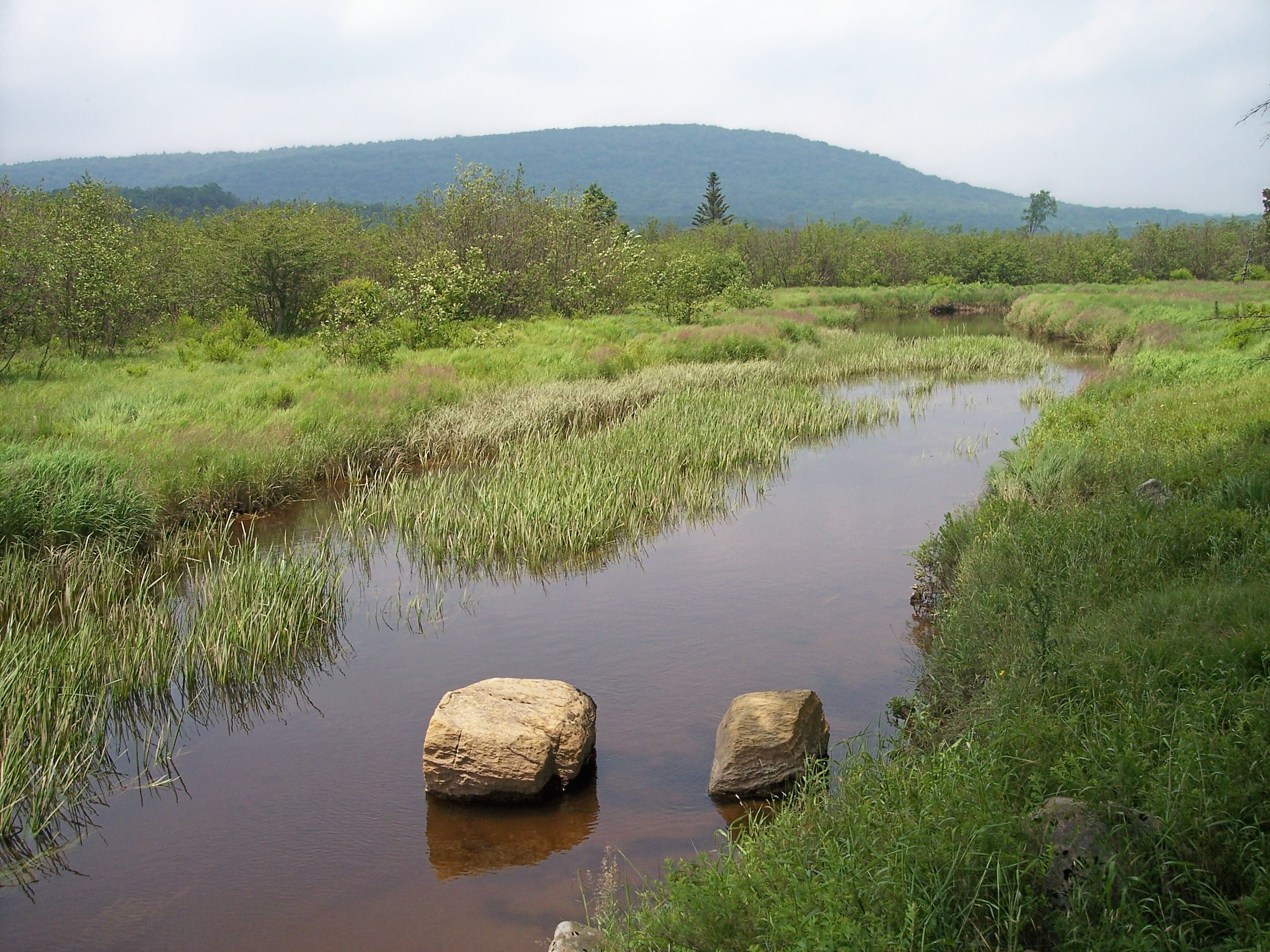
- Blackwater River in the park.

- Location within West Virginia Location within the United States
- Location: Tucker, West Virginia, United States
- Coordinates: 39°01′25″N 79°27′57″W
- Area: 6,015 acres (24.34 km^{2})
- Established: 1971
- Operator: Regency Hotel Management Company
- Website: wvstateparks.com/park/canaan-valley-resort-state-park/

Canaan Valley Resort State Park is a state park in the eastern United States, within Canaan Valley in Tucker County, West Virginia. Located in the highest valley east of the Mississippi River, the park contains the second-largest inland wetland area in the United States. The valley featured the first commercial ski development in West Virginia.

== History ==
In 1950 and 1951, members of the Washington Ski Club identified the Canaan Valley side of Cabin Mountain as an opportune place for ski development, based on pilots' reports. Because of its protection from the sun, snow on that side of the mountain often remains until April or later.

The club began slope development in the early 1950s, signing a ten year operational lease with local landowners in 1954. Their slope, named Cabin Mountain Ski Area, featured two rope tows on 40 acres (0.16 km^{2}) of terrain stretching from route 32 to a height of 3,600 feet (1,100 m). Runs extended .25 miles (400 m) down a slope with a vertical drop of 300 feet (91 m). It was the first commercial ski establishment south of the Mason–Dixon line. The ski area closed in 1962.

In 1955, University of Virginia School of Law student Robert Barton established Weiss Knob Ski Area, climbing the slope of Weiss Knob above the Cabin Mountain site to a height of 3,900 feet (1,200 m). It featured 60 acres (0.24 km^{2}) of terrain serviced by a T-bar as well as three rope tows. This site was acquired by the state of West Virginia in 1959, so Barton reopened "Weiss Knob Ski Area" at a new site on Cabin Mountain's Bald Knob. Opening in fall 1959, the new site featured four rope tows and the first snowmaking equipment in West Virginia; in its first season, 412 inches (1,050 cm) of snow fell, burying the equipment and closing the facility for the year. The resort remained open until 1970, when the impending opening of Canaan Valley Resort prompted Barton to go out of business. This new ski area was actually a redevelopment of the original Weiss Knob site; the second Weiss Knob site would be re-opened as the second home of White Grass Ski Touring Center in 1981.

In 1957, the state of West Virginia made its first land acquisition with an eye toward further developing a ski industry in West Virginia. Sarah Maude Thompson Kaemmerling granted 3,149 acres (12.74 km^{2}) to the state in the 1950s for the formation of a state park with the stipulation that the state make a matching 3,000-acre (12 km^{2}) acquisition. The state would go on to forcefully claim more than 30 properties between 1964 and 1970. It was not until 1971, however, that the Canaan Valley Resort State Park was established centering on the ski slopes at the southern end of the Valley. In 1972, an 18-hole golf course was also constructed there. The lodge at Canaan Valley Resort State Park Lodge opened in 1977.

The park has been very successful and several private ski operations have opened nearby and in other parts of the state as well.

== Canaan Valley Resort ==
Canaan Valley
- Interactive map of Canaan Valley
- Location: Canaan Valley; Tucker County; West Virginia, U.S.
- Nearest city: Davis
- Coordinates: 39°01′25″N 79°27′57″W
- Vertical: 850 ft (259 m)
- Top elevation: 4,280 ft (1,305 m)
- Base elevation: 3,430 ft (1,050 m)
- Skiable area: 91 acres (0.37 km^{2})
- Trails: 49
- Longest run: 1.1 miles (1.8 km)
- Lift system: 3 chairlifts
- Lift capacity: 6,000 per hour
- Terrain parks: 1
- Snowfall: More than 117 inches (300 cm)
- Snowmaking: 75% of trails
- Night skiing: Fri-Sat to 8 pm 50% of trails
- Website: www.canaanresort.com

Canaan Valley Resort opened for skiing in 1971, on the original site of Weiss Knob Ski Area. It offers 47 ski trails, one terrain park, and a snow tubing area. A chairlift and magic carpet give access to the resort's beginner skiing area, located on the right of the mountain (facing up the slope). Other than this terrain and a green trail running from the summit to the resort base, all the mountain terrain is marked more difficult (blue) or most difficult (black). These blue and black slopes generally descend the mountain at the same pitch, regardless of their difficulty marking. A triple chair and quad chair give access to the resort summit; the latter also has a mid-mountain station, which is the point beginners are encouraged to offload as the upper part of the mountain is steeper.

=== Amenities and recreation ===
Canaan Valley Resort State Park features a 160 room lodge, plus 23 cabins & cottages, and 34 campsites. The park also provides hiking trails, bike trails, ski area, and an 18 hole championship-level golf course designed by Geoffrey Cornish. In 2016, a paragliding launch site was opened on Cabin Mountain, and is accessible from the ski lift.

=== Explosion ===
On Sunday, February 14, 1988, a mid-day explosion and fire in a maintenance building killed three men who were attending an air compressor for the snowmaking system. The building also contained several drums of chemicals.

== See also ==
- Alpine skiing
- List of West Virginia state parks
- Canaan Valley National Wildlife Refuge
- White Grass Ski Touring Center
