= Shrub swamp =

Type of wetland ecosystem

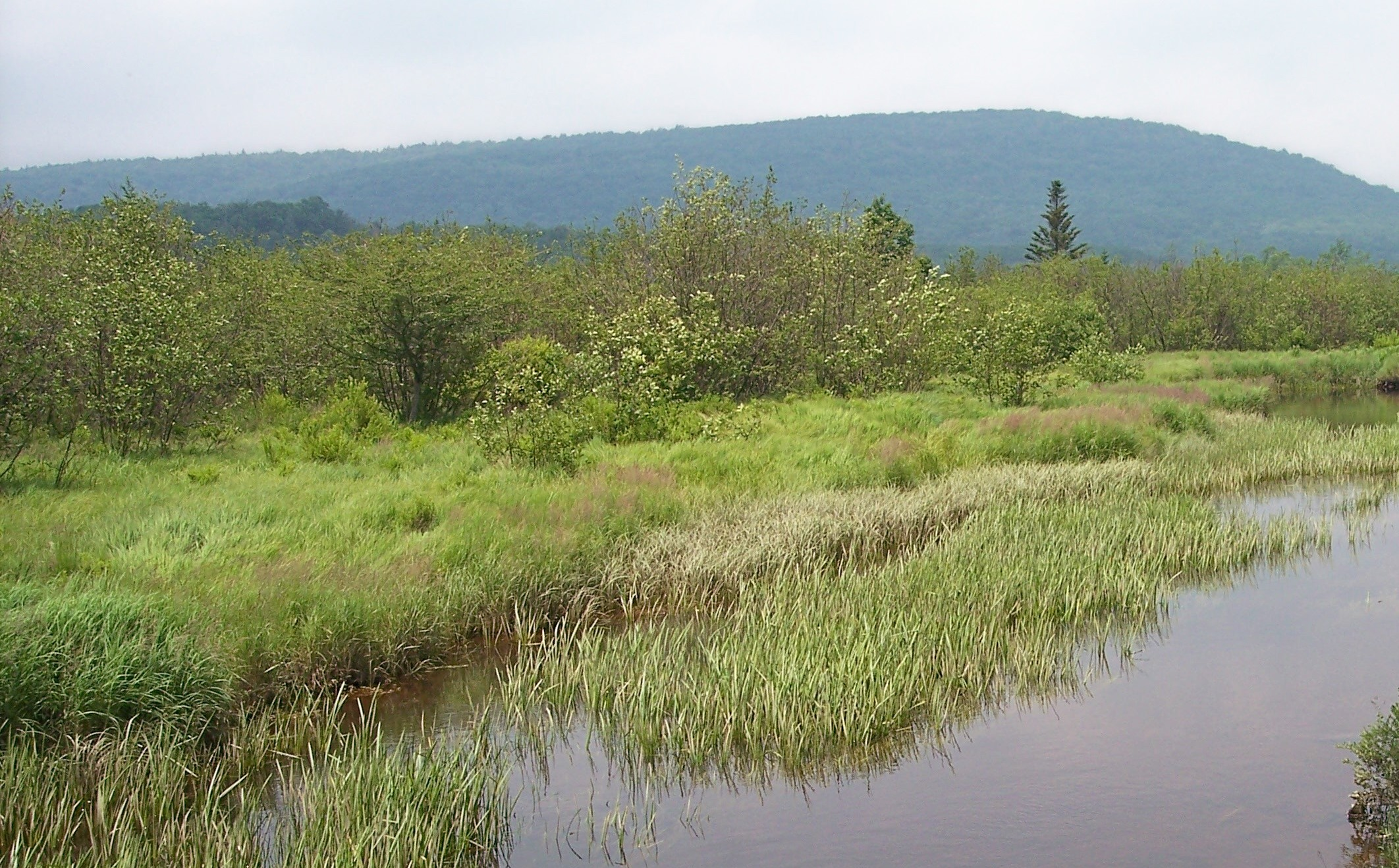
The Blackwater River passes through a shrub swamp in Canaan Valley, West Virginia, US.

Shrub swamps — also called scrub swamps or buttonbush swamps — are a type of freshwater wetland ecosystem occurring in areas too wet to become swamps ("true" or freshwater swamp forest), but too dry or too shallow to become marshes. They are often considered transitional ("mid-successional") between wet meadows or fens and conifer or hardwood swamps.

By some classifications, shrub swamps must have at least 50% shrub cover and less than 20% tree cover. Other definitions specify large shrubs with small trees less than 35 feet (11 m) in height. Creation of shrub swamps often follows a catastrophic event in a forested swamp (flood, cutting, fire, or windstorm). Another route of development is via drained meadows and fens which progress to shrub swamps as a transitional state to forested swamps.

== Development ==
As a wet meadow matures it begins to fill in with vegetation and as this decomposes the soil thickens creating high spots (hummocks) above the water. Shrubs and small trees begin to grow on these. Shrub swamp water comes from run-off, streams and rivers and the water moves in and out of the swamp throughout the year. Consequently, they tend to be drier than wet meadows or forested swamps and permit water intolerant plant species to grow on the hummocks. Shrub swamps typically occur on organic soils, such as muck and shallow peat soils. Common plants found in the shrub swamps of North America include alders, willows, elderberry and highbush blueberry.

== Types ==
- Palustrine shrub swamp
- Circumneutral shrub swamp

== Notable shrub swamps ==
- Canaan Valley, West Virginia
- Cranberry Glades, West Virginia
