= Timberline Mountain =

Ski resort in West Virginia

- Interactive map of Timberline Mountain
- Location: Canaan Valley, Tucker County, West Virginia
- Nearest city: Davis, West Virginia
- Coordinates: 39.0425°N 79.3990°W
- Status: Operating
- Vertical: 1,000 ft (300 m)
- Top elevation: 4,268 ft (1,301 m)
- Skiable area: 100 acres (40 ha)
- Trails: 23 total 9 Easier; 6 More Difficult; 4 Most Difficult; 2 Expert Only; 2 terrain parks
- Longest run: "Salamander" 2 mi (3.2 km)
- Lift system: 2 carpets, two chairs
- Terrain parks: 2
- Snowfall: 200 in (510 cm)
- Snowmaking: Yes
- Night skiing: Held on select nights on 8 trails
- Website: https://timberlinemountain.com/

Timberline Mountain, also known as Timberline Four Seasons Resort or Timberline WV, is an alpine skiing resort in Canaan Valley, West Virginia. It has two surface lifts, one quad chairlift, and one six-pack chairlift. The resort has two terrain parks, a hotel, night skiing held only on select nights, and two glade trails. Its longest slope, Salamander, stretches for two miles and is the longest in the Mid-Atlantic region.

== Trail list ==
Easier

- First Flurries Beginner Area
- Winterset
- Whiteout
- Easy Does It
- Mid-Mountain Crossroad
- Salamander
- Ceiling
- Bear Stroll
- Flag Spruce

More difficult

- Lower Thunder Struck
- Lower Almost Heaven
- Lower Dew Drop
- Almost Heaven
- Upper Dew Drop
- Twister

Most difficult

- Pearly Glades
- Glade Runner
- White Lightning
- Thunder Struck

Experts only

- Off The Wall
- The Drop

Terrain parks

- Snow Squall
- Thunder Snow

== Resort history ==
First called Timberline Four Seasons Resort, it was opened in January 1987 after a real estate developer named David Downs started making ski runs, calling the area Mt. Timberline. Wanting to develop a large ski resort, Dr. Frederick Reichle and family bought a large amount of land on Cabin Mountain, creating Timberline Four Seasons Resort. Into the 2000s, the resort was successful. However, the old infrastructure started breaking down, including issues with lifts and snowmaking equipment. One such incident occurred in February 2016 where a chairlift malfunction injured multiple skiers (though there were no fatalities). The incident was caused by a cross arm disconnecting from a lift tower and falling to the ground. The incident caused customers to be drawn away from the resort. Thus, the resort faced challenges, including financial and legal troubles, which led to its closure and bankruptcy in February of 2019. In November 2019, it was bought by Perfect North Slopes, an alpine skiing resort in Indiana, who invested 10 million USD in renovations, including new lifts, lodge remodeling, and snowmaking upgrades. Then, it re-opened as Timberline Mountain and it continues to operate as a popular place for Appalachian skiing.
