= Parsons, West Virginia =

City in West Virginia, US

- City
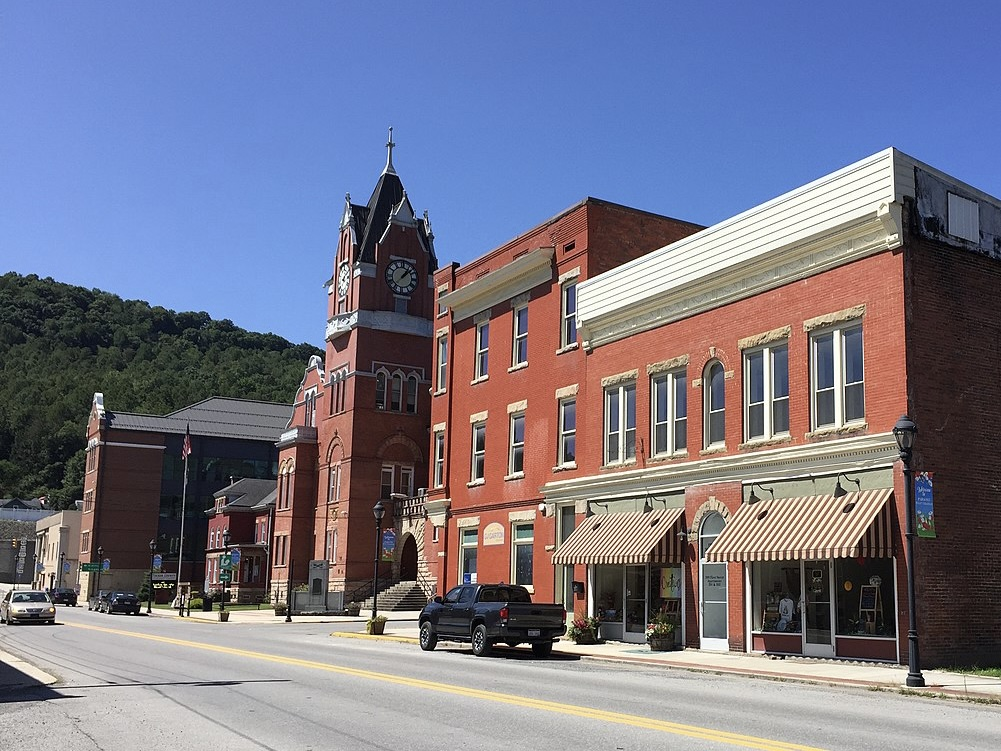
- First Street in Parsons

- Seal
- Interactive map of Parsons, West Virginia
- Location within West Virginia Location within the United States
- Coordinates: 39°5′45″N 79°40′46″W
- Country: United States
- State: West Virginia
- County: Tucker
- Incorporated (town): June 16, 1893
- Incorporated (city): February 18, 1907
- Named for: Ward Parsons

Government
  - Mayor: Bruce Kolsun

Area
  - Total: 1.20 sq mi (3.11 km^{2})
  - Land: 1.12 sq mi (2.91 km^{2})
  - Water: 0.077 sq mi (0.20 km^{2})
- Elevation: 1,647 ft (502 m)

Population (2020)
  - Total: 1,327
  - Estimate (2021): 1,307
  - Density: 1,239.3/sq mi (478.49/km^{2})
- Time zone: UTC-5 (Eastern (EST))
  - Summer (DST): UTC-4 (EDT)
- ZIP code: 26287
- Area code: 304
- FIPS code: 54-62284
- GNIS feature ID: 1555312
- Website: cityofparsonswv.com

Parsons is a city in Tucker County, West Virginia, United States, and its county seat. The population was 1,322 at the 2020 census. Parsons is located at the confluence of the Shavers Fork and the Black Fork, forming the head of the Cheat River.

== History ==
Parsons was named for Ward Parsons, described by one source as having once owned the land on which the town was built, and by another as having been an aged wilderness pioneer in the area. The West Virginia Central and Pittsburg Railway was built into Parsons in 1888, which caused the town to boom by the 1890s. The railway was later merged into the Western Maryland Railway and provided passenger train service until the 1950s.

In the early 1890s, a dispute known as the Tucker County Seat War took place between the people in the town of Parsons and that of St. George over the location of the county seat. Although nobody was killed in the "war," the situation came to a climax when a mob of armed men from Parsons marched on St. George and took the county records by force.

The 1985 Cheat River flood caused extensive damage in Parsons. Over 90 percent of the businesses and hundreds of homes were damaged or destroyed. Twenty-five years later, in 2010, several empty storefronts lined the street up to the courthouse. Bars, restaurants, clothing stores and other businesses never returned to Parsons. The floods caused an estimated $570 million in damage. More than 3,500 homes and 180 businesses were destroyed. The BF Long & Co general store had a "high water mark" more than 7'6" from the floorboards. The flood stage in the shallow riverbed was only 7 feet.

Located at Parsons and listed on the National Register of Historic Places are the Tucker County Bank Building, Tucker County Courthouse and Jail, and Western Maryland Depot.

== Geography ==
The Cheat River is formed at Parsons by the confluence of the Shavers Fork and the Black Fork.

The city has a total area of 1.20 square miles (3.11 km^{2}), of which 1.11 square miles (2.87 km^{2}) is land and 0.09 square miles (0.23 km^{2}) is water.

=== Climate ===
According to the Köppen climate classification system, Parsons has a humid subtropical climate, abbreviated Cfa on climate maps, although it closely borders on and resembles a humid continental climate (Dfa) especially in its snowfall total of 55.3 inches or 1.4 metres. The climate is characterised by very warm and humid summers, chilly to freezing winters, and heavy precipitation year-round.

Parsons had 96.99 inches or 2,463.5 millimetres of precipitation in 2018, a state record.

Climate data for Parsons, West Virginia (1991–2020 normals, extremes 1899–present)
Month	Jan	Feb	Mar	Apr	May	Jun	Jul	Aug	Sep	Oct	Nov	Dec	Year
Record high °F (°C)	80 (27)	82 (28)	88 (31)	98 (37)	95 (35)	102 (39)	102 (39)	102 (39)	100 (38)	90 (32)	82 (28)	77 (25)	102 (39)
Mean daily maximum °F (°C)	39.4 (4.1)	43.0 (6.1)	51.7 (10.9)	64.3 (17.9)	72.8 (22.7)	79.5 (26.4)	83.0 (28.3)	81.9 (27.7)	76.1 (24.5)	65.2 (18.4)	53.3 (11.8)	43.3 (6.3)	62.8 (17.1)
Daily mean °F (°C)	30.7 (−0.7)	33.5 (0.8)	41.2 (5.1)	51.9 (11.1)	61.4 (16.3)	68.9 (20.5)	72.9 (22.7)	71.9 (22.2)	65.5 (18.6)	54.1 (12.3)	43.0 (6.1)	35.0 (1.7)	52.5 (11.4)
Mean daily minimum °F (°C)	22.1 (−5.5)	23.9 (−4.5)	30.6 (−0.8)	39.5 (4.2)	50.0 (10.0)	58.3 (14.6)	62.8 (17.1)	61.9 (16.6)	54.9 (12.7)	42.9 (6.1)	32.7 (0.4)	26.8 (−2.9)	42.2 (5.7)
Record low °F (°C)	−28 (−33)	−18 (−28)	−8 (−22)	0 (−18)	21 (−6)	30 (−1)	36 (2)	36 (2)	28 (−2)	12 (−11)	−7 (−22)	−26 (−32)	−28 (−33)
Average precipitation inches (mm)	3.81 (97)	3.88 (99)	4.45 (113)	4.64 (118)	5.79 (147)	5.95 (151)	5.79 (147)	4.75 (121)	4.04 (103)	3.94 (100)	3.60 (91)	4.37 (111)	55.01 (1,397)
Average snowfall inches (cm)	16.8 (43)	15.0 (38)	9.2 (23)	1.6 (4.1)	0.0 (0.0)	0.0 (0.0)	0.0 (0.0)	0.0 (0.0)	0.0 (0.0)	0.1 (0.25)	3.3 (8.4)	9.3 (24)	55.3 (140)
Average precipitation days (≥ 0.01 in)	19.1	16.0	16.3	14.9	15.9	14.1	14.8	13.0	11.1	11.4	12.1	17.3	176.0
Average snowy days (≥ 0.1 in)	8.6	6.6	3.8	1.1	0.0	0.0	0.0	0.0	0.0	0.2	1.8	6.2	28.3
Source: NOAA

== Demographics ==
Historical population
Census	Pop.	Note	%±
1900	618		—
1910	1,780		188.0%
1920	2,001		12.4%
1930	2,012		0.5%
1940	2,077		3.2%
1950	2,009		−3.3%
1960	1,798		−10.5%
1970	1,784		−0.8%
1980	1,937		8.6%
1990	1,453		−25.0%
2000	1,463		0.7%
2010	1,485		1.5%
2020	1,327		−10.6%
2021 (est.)	1,307		−1.5%
U.S. Decennial Census

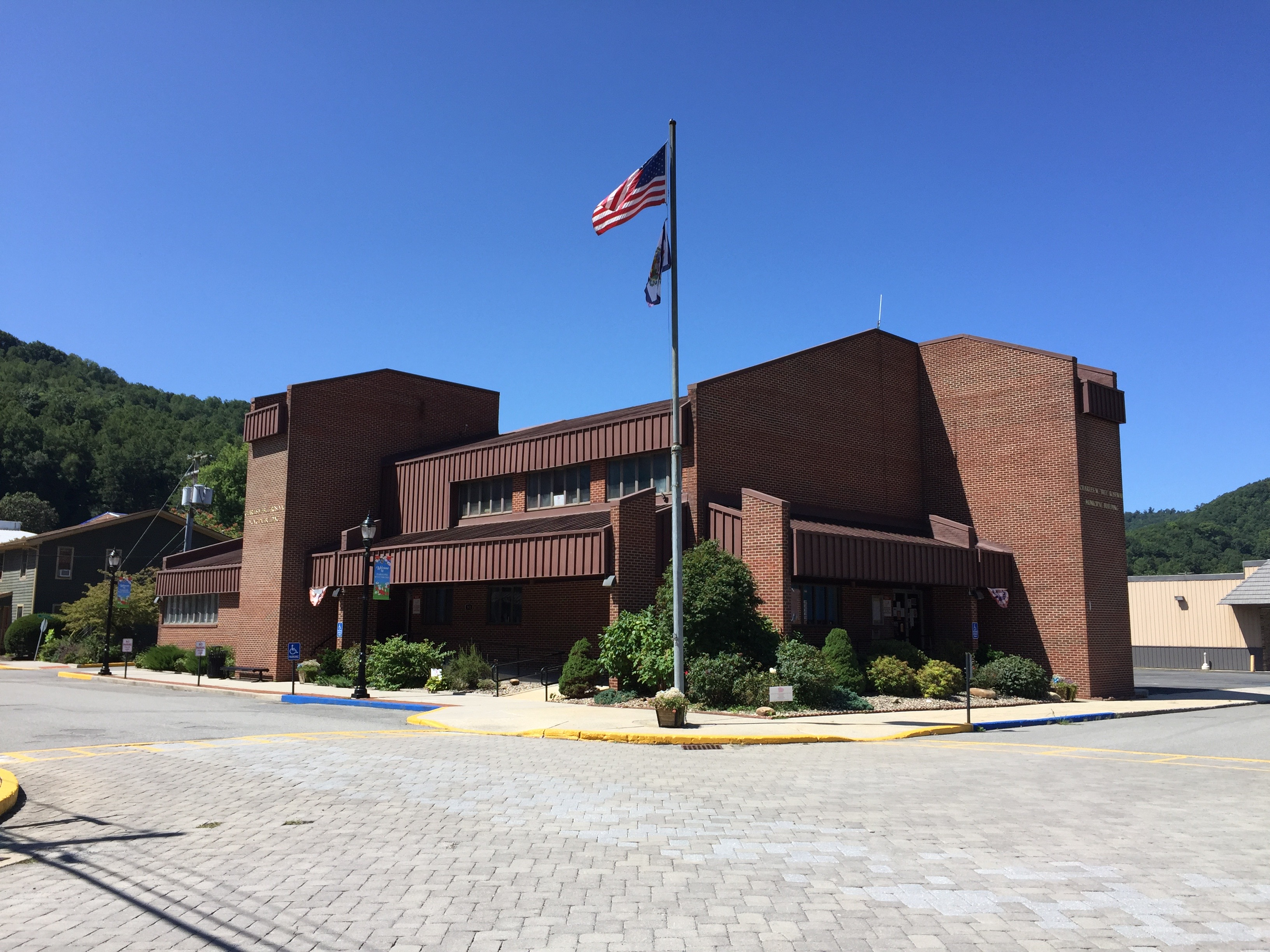
Charles W. "Bill" Rosenau Municipal Building in 2021

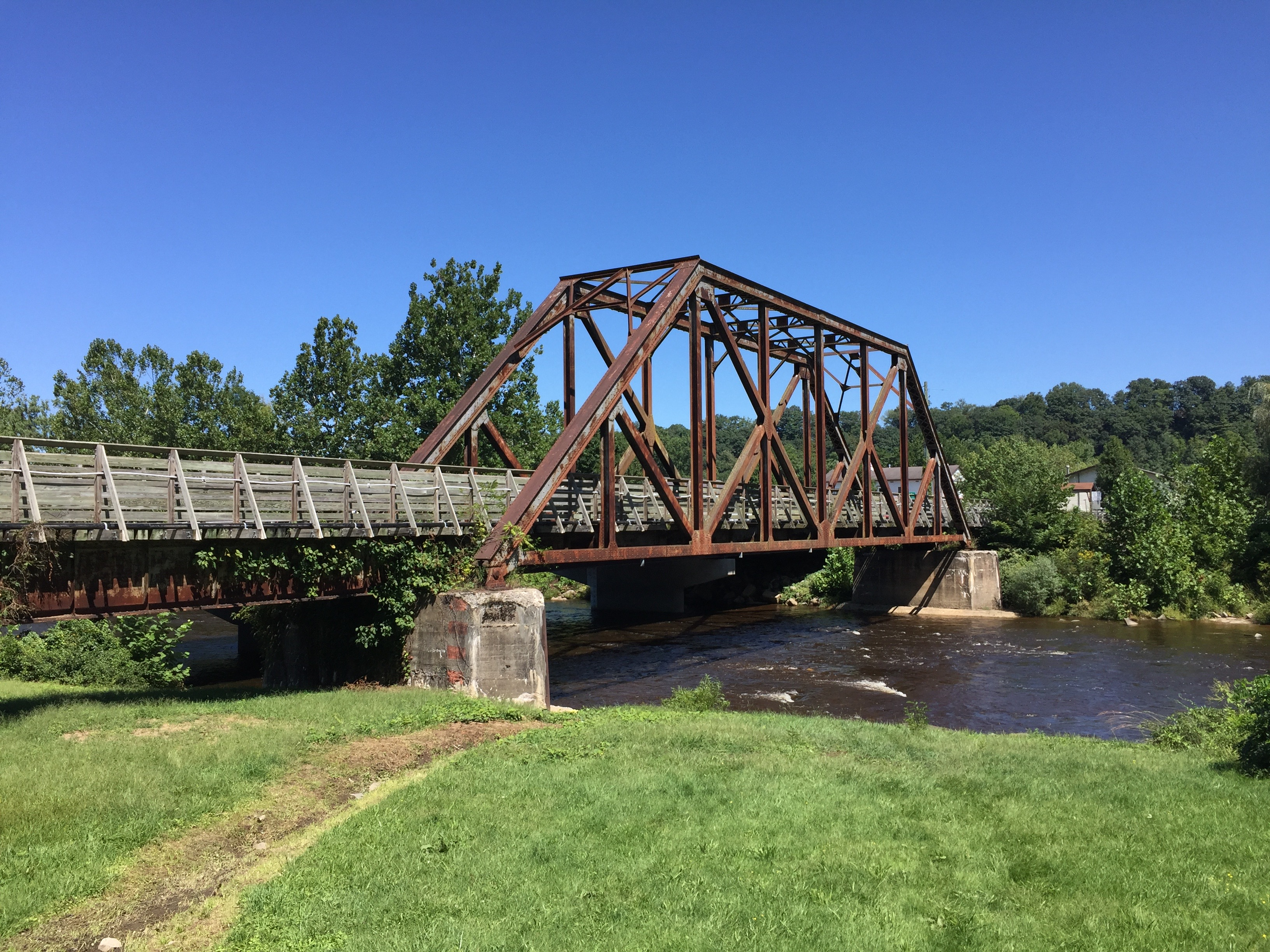
Former rail bridge over Shavers Fork in 2021, now used by the West Virginia Allegheny Trail

=== 2020 census ===
As of the 2020 census, Parsons had a population of 1,327. The median age was 43.7 years. 21.6% of residents were under the age of 18 and 21.3% of residents were 65 years of age or older. For every 100 females there were 101.1 males, and for every 100 females age 18 and over there were 104.1 males age 18 and over.

0.0% of residents lived in urban areas, while 100.0% lived in rural areas.

There were 584 households in Parsons, of which 27.7% had children under the age of 18 living in them. Of all households, 43.5% were married-couple households, 22.9% were households with a male householder and no spouse or partner present, and 26.0% were households with a female householder and no spouse or partner present. About 33.5% of all households were made up of individuals and 15.4% had someone living alone who was 65 years of age or older.

There were 681 housing units, of which 14.2% were vacant. The homeowner vacancy rate was 0.9% and the rental vacancy rate was 8.1%.

Racial composition as of the 2020 census
Race	Number	Percent
White	1,253	94.4%
Black or African American	5	0.4%
American Indian and Alaska Native	0	0.0%
Asian	1	0.1%
Native Hawaiian and Other Pacific Islander	0	0.0%
Some other race	9	0.7%
Two or more races	59	4.4%
Hispanic or Latino (of any race)	18	1.4%

=== 2010 census ===
As of the census of 2010, there were 1,485 people, 628 households, and 419 families living in the city. The population density was 1,337.8 inhabitants per square mile (516.5/km^{2}). There were 730 housing units at an average density of 657.7 per square mile (253.9/km^{2}). The racial makeup of the city was 98.8% White, 0.1% African American, 0.1% Native American, and 1.1% from two or more races. Hispanic or Latino of any race were 0.8% of the population.

There were 628 households, of which 29.8% had children under the age of 18 living with them, 50.3% were married couples living together, 10.8% had a female householder with no husband present, 5.6% had a male householder with no wife present, and 33.3% were non-families. 29.3% of all households were made up of individuals, and 15.4% had someone living alone who was 65 years of age or older. The average household size was 2.36 and the average family size was 2.87.

The median age in the city was 42.7 years. 22.7% of residents were under the age of 18; 6.7% were between the ages of 18 and 24; 24.4% were from 25 to 44; 26.4% were from 45 to 64; and 19.9% were 65 years of age or older. The gender makeup of the city was 48.7% male and 51.3% female.

=== 2000 census ===
As of the census of 2000, there were 1,463 people, 642 households, and 426 families living in the city. The population density was 1,332.5 people per square mile (2.566/km^{2}. There were 731 housing units at an average density of 665.8 per square mile (2.566/km^{2}). The racial makeup of the city was 98.97% White, 0.21% Native American, 0.07% from other races, and 0.75% from two or more races. Hispanic or Latino of any race were 0.34% of the population.

There were 642 households, out of which 27.4% had children under the age of 18 living with them, 52.5% were married couples living together, 10.3% had a female householder with no husband present, and 33.5% were non-families. 29.9% of all households were made up of individuals, and 14.5% had someone living alone who was 65 years of age or older. The average household size was 2.28 and the average family size was 2.82.

In the city, the population was spread out, with 22.4% under the age of 18, 6.7% from 18 to 24, 27.8% from 25 to 44, 25.2% from 45 to 64, and 18.0% who were 65 years of age or older. The median age was 40 years. For every 100 females, there were 89.5 males. For every 100 females age 18 and over, there were 86.8 males.

The median income for a household in the city was $26,424, and the median income for a family was $31,645. Males had a median income of $22,331 versus $20,069 for females. The per capita income for the city was $16,565. About 16.1% of families and 18.7% of the population were below the poverty line, including 22.7% of those under age 18 and 13.0% of those age 65 or over.
