= Tucker County Bank Building =

- U.S. National Register of Historic Places
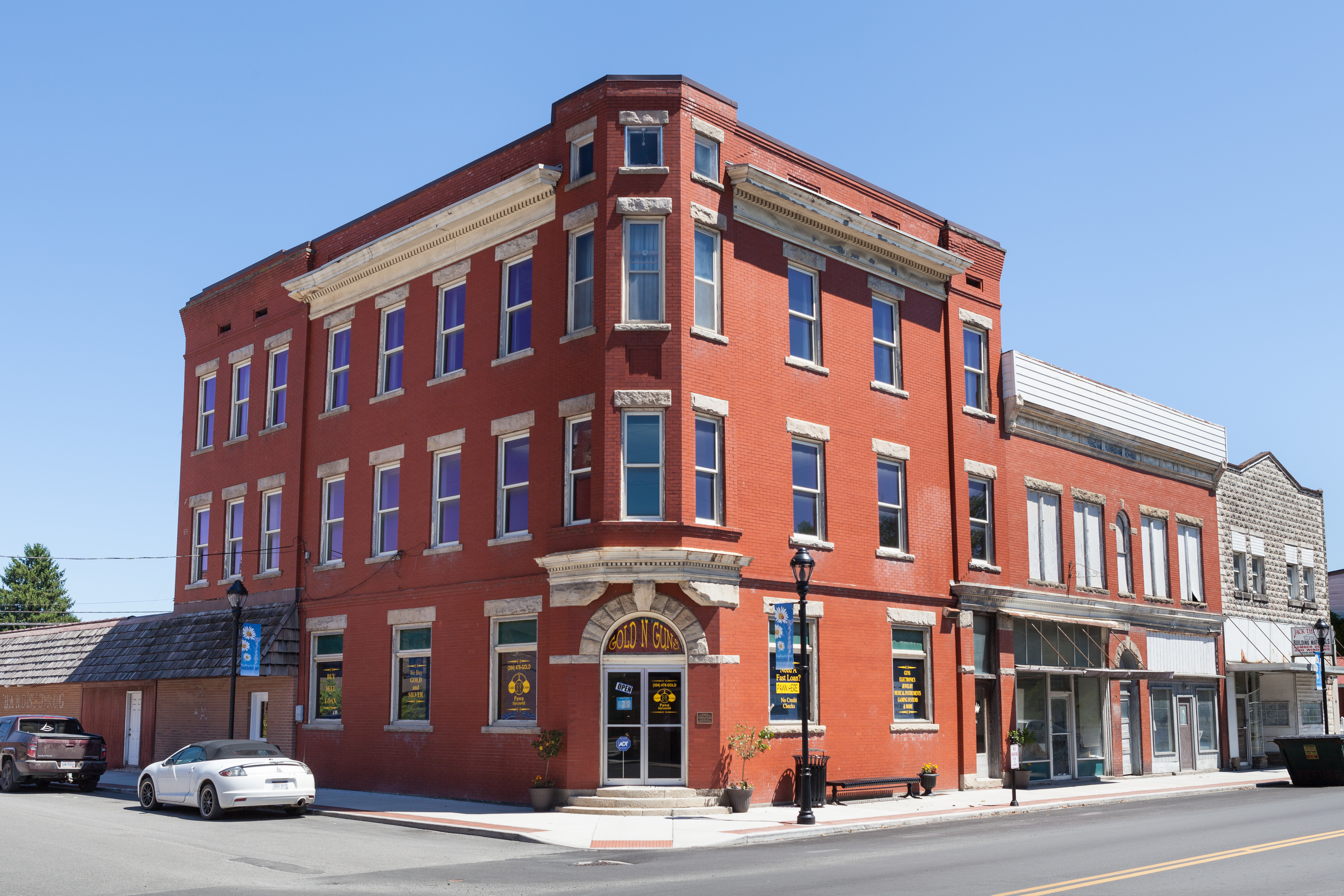
- From 1st Street, looking North

- Location within West Virginia Location within the United States
- Location: 1000 Walnut St., Parsons, West Virginia
- Coordinates: 39°05′49.1″N 79°40′47.2″W
- Area: less than one acre
- Built: 1901
- Architectural style: Romanesque Revival
- NRHP reference No.: 10000579
- Added to NRHP: August 26, 2010

Tucker County Bank Building is a historic bank building located at Parsons, Tucker County, West Virginia. It was built in 1901, and is a three-story brick commercial building with a rusticated ashlar base and accents in the Romanesque Revival style. It features a corner turret with angled entrance. The building housed the Tucker County Bank until 1969. Over time, it also housed a Masonic Lodge, the Board of Education, a telephone company, doctor's offices, law firms, insurance agencies, a bus depot, a soda fountain and a drug store.

It was listed on the National Register of Historic Places in 2010.
