= Canaan Valley National Wildlife Refuge =

National Wildlife Refuge

- IUCN category IV (habitat/species management area)
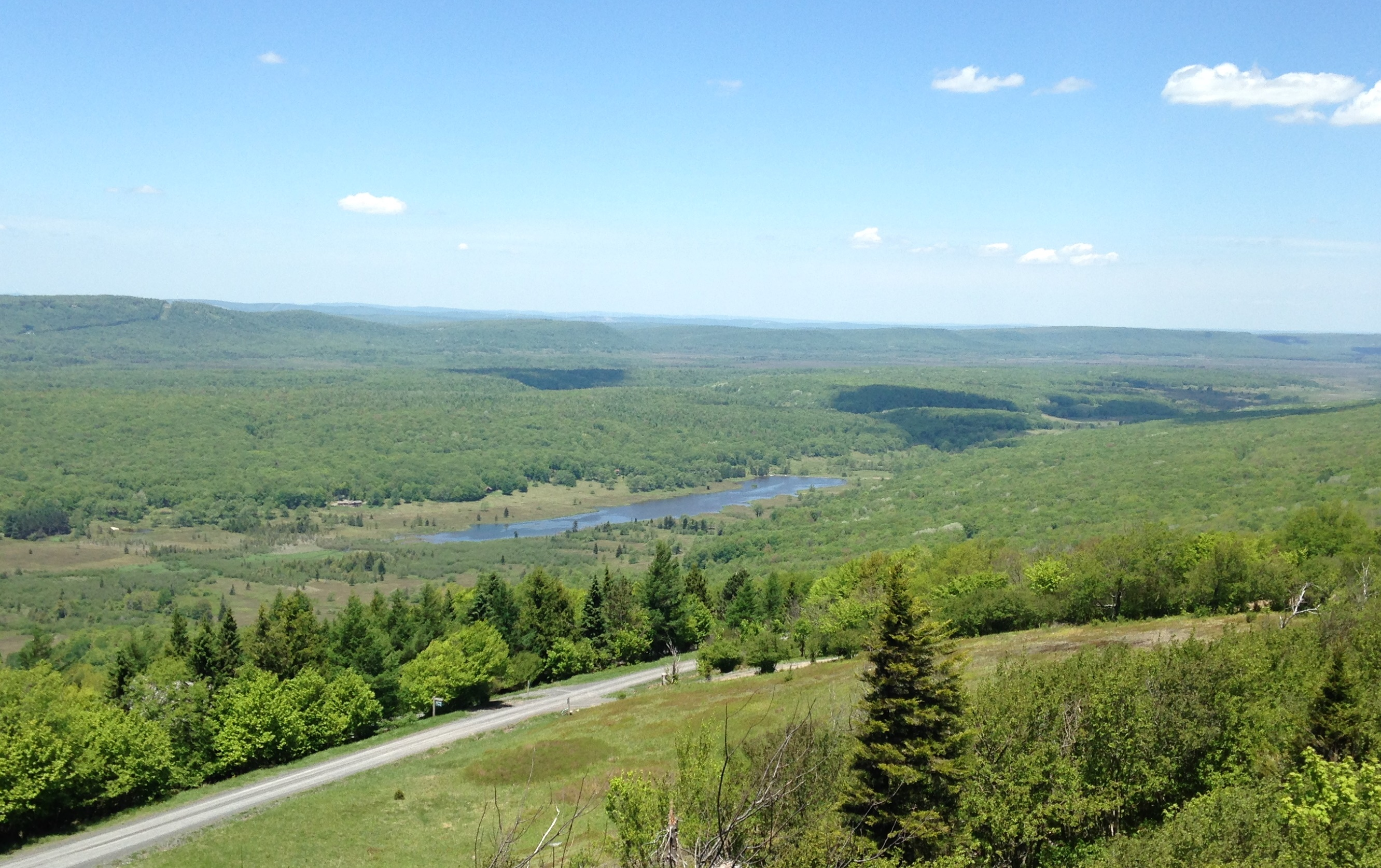
- View of the northern half of Canaan Valley from atop Harmon Knob in 2015

- Location within West Virginia
- Location: Tucker, West Virginia, United States
- Coordinates: 39°06′05″N 79°23′20″W
- Area: 16,613.44 acres (67.2322 km^{2})
- Elevation: 3,284 ft (1,001 m)
- Established: July 11, 1994
- Website: Canaan Valley National Wildlife Refuge

The Canaan Valley National Wildlife Refuge (CVNWR) in Tucker County, West Virginia, was the 500th National Wildlife Refuge (NWR) to be established in the United States. The refuge preserves a moist valley with unique wetlands and uplands at a relatively high elevation in the Allegheny Mountains. It is administered by the U.S. Fish and Wildlife Service (USFWS).

== History ==
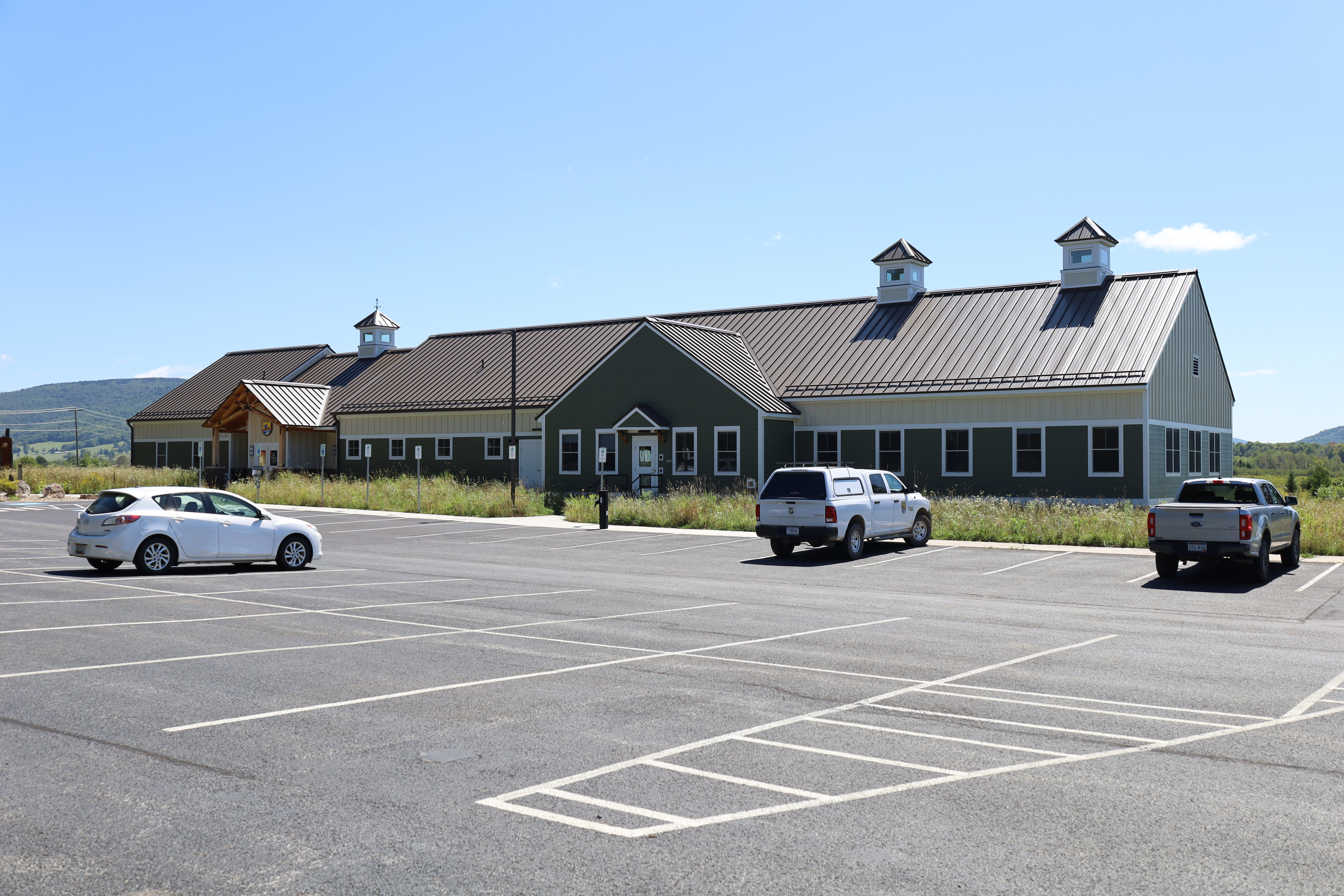
The refuge visitor center in 2021

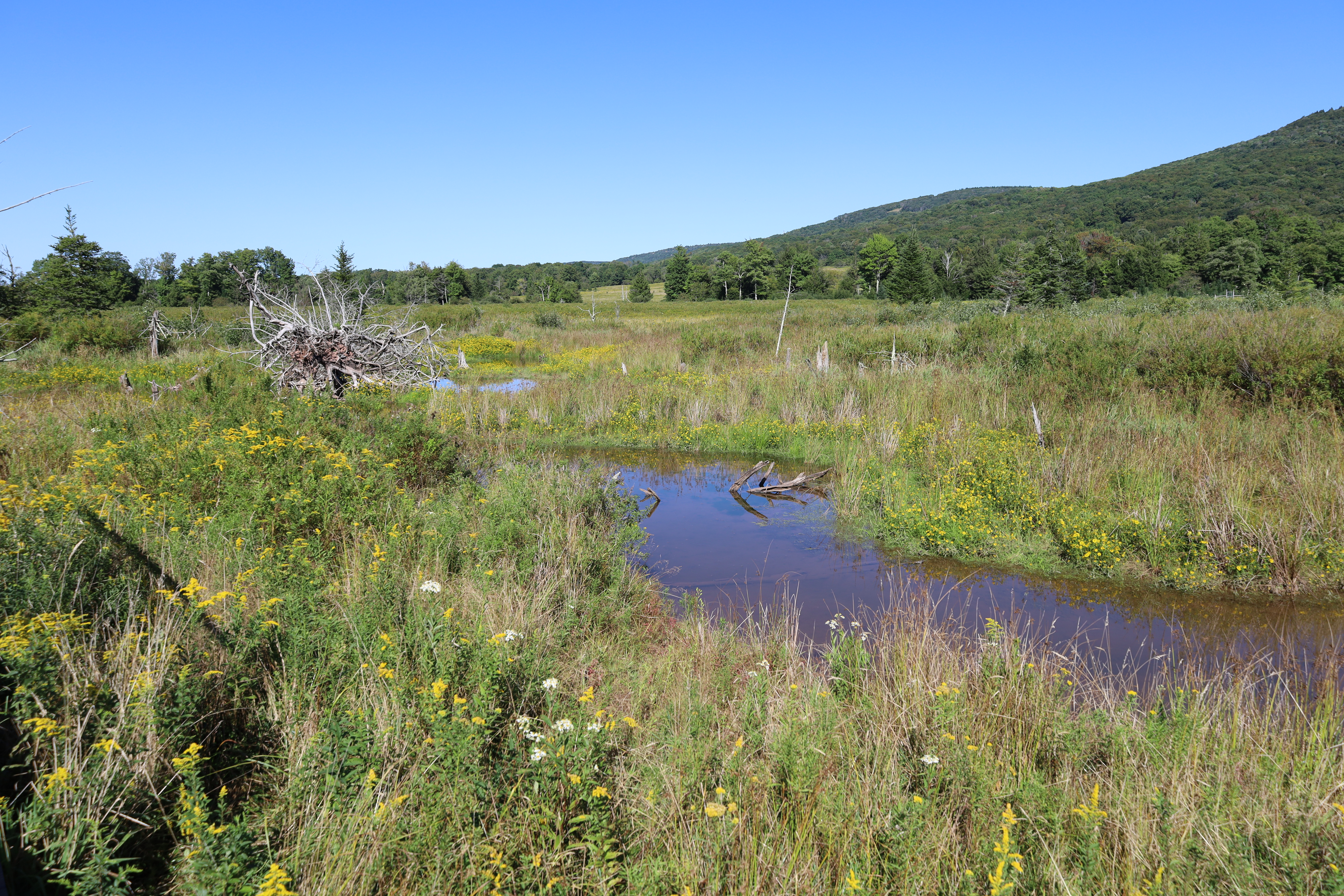
View from the Freeland Boardwalk Trail in the southern part of the refuge in 2021

Advocacy for the establishment of a wildlife refuge in Canaan Valley began as early as 1961. In the 1970s, environmental and citizens' groups battled with Allegheny Power Systems (APS), which had owned more than 13,000 acres (53 km^{2}) of Canaan Valley since 1923, over construction of a long-anticipated hydroelectric facility that would have flooded about a quarter of the valley. In 1977, the Federal Power Commission issued a license to APS for construction of a pumped storage hydroelectric project, formally known as the Davis Power Project. However, the following year the Project was denied a Clean Water Act permit by the U.S. Army Corps of Engineers. The Corps' decision cited adverse impacts upon the Valley's wetlands, a relatively new concept at the time.

Canaan Valley NWR was initially approved following an Environmental Impact Statement on May 30, 1979. APS appealed the Corps' decision all the way to the Supreme Court, which in 1988 declined to hear the case, thus clearing the way for creation of the refuge. About 86 acres (350,000 m^{2}) were purchased in the valley to establish the refuge on July 11, 1994. Another 12,000 acres (48 km^{2}) were purchased from APS in 2002. With other additions, 120 acres in 2008 and 325 acres (1 km^{2}) in 2011. Most recently there was a 1971 acre expansion made in January 2024, the refuge now encompasses some 16,628 acres (67 km^{2}) of a total authorized size of 25,459 acres (103 km^{2}). This represents almost 70% of the valley's 25,000 acres (100 km^{2}).

== Wildlife ==
Several habitat types can be found in the wet soils of the forests, shrublands and open spaces in the refuge. White-tailed deer, raccoons, geese, and squirrels are common, and minks, bobcats, black bears, and barred owls can be seen. Beaver dams affect local water levels. Gamebird species include wild turkeys, ruffed grouse, and woodcocks. The area is also an important habitat for many declining North American bird species, including the bobolink, clay-colored sparrow, Henslow's sparrow, northern saw-whet owl, and cerulean warbler. The fish fauna includes native brook trout and introduced species of trout and bass.

== Recreation and access ==
Facilitated refuge activities include wildlife observation and photography, hunting, fishing, hiking, environmental education, and nature programs.

The refuge maintains 31 miles (50 km) of designated trails, including:

- 31 miles (50 km) for pedestrian use
- 23 miles (37 km) for bicycle use
- 22 miles (35 km) for horseback use

The refuge also maintains 7 miles (11 km) of roads for licensed vehicles to provide public access.

== See also ==
- Canaan Valley Resort State Park
