= Canaan Valley =

Upland valley in northeastern Tucker County, West Virginia

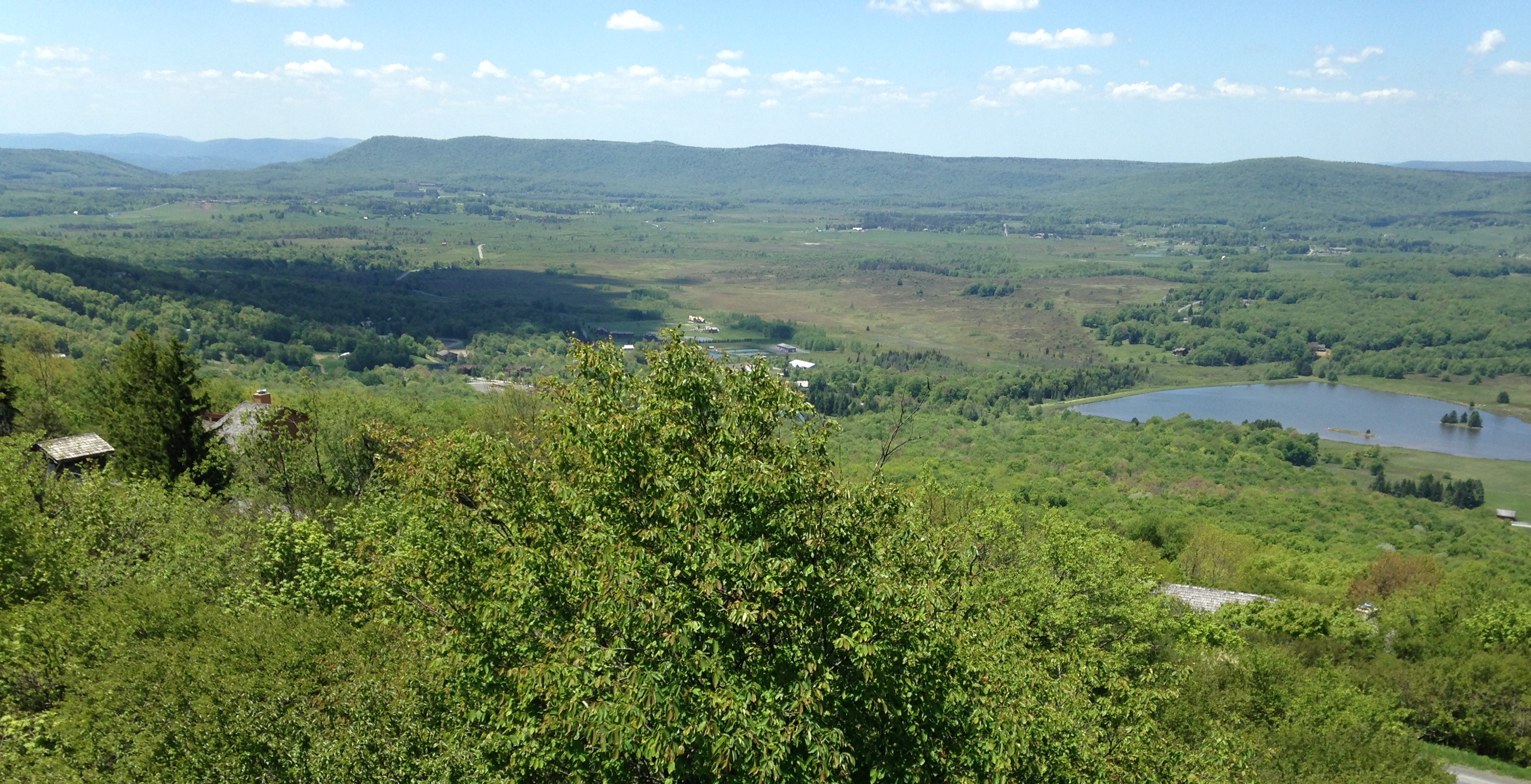
- View of the southern end of Canaan Valley from atop Harman Knob.

- Location within West Virginia
- Floor elevation: 3,200 ft (980 m)
- Area: 39 mi^{2} (100 km^{2})

Geography
- Country: United States
- State: West Virginia
- County: Tucker
- Coordinates: 39°07′36″N 79°22′41″W
- Interactive map of Canaan Valley

Canaan Valley (locally /kəˈneɪn/) is a large bathtub-shaped upland valley in northeastern Tucker County, West Virginia, USA. Within it are extensive wetlands and the headwaters of the Blackwater River which spills out of the valley at Blackwater Falls. It is a well-known and partially undeveloped scenic attraction and tourist draw. Since 1994, almost 70% of the Valley has become the Canaan Valley National Wildlife Refuge, the nation's 500th National Wildlife Refuge, with Canaan Valley Resort State Park and Blackwater Falls State Park nearby.

Canaan Valley was designated a National Natural Landmark in 1974. The National Park Service citation indicates that the Valley is "a splendid 'museum' of Pleistocene habitats ... contain[ing] ... an aggregation of these habitats seldom found in the eastern United States. It is unique as a northern boreal relict community at this latitude by virtue of its size, elevation and diversity."

The local pronunciation of "Canaan" is /kəˈneɪn/, rather than the conventional /ˈkeɪnən/ for the Biblical region from which the area questionably takes its name. According to legend, this is the result of improper pronunciation by the German settler who named the valley.

As the legend goes, he described the valley as being as gorgeous as the Canaan described in the Bible. His mispronunciation of the word stuck.

However, it has also been speculated for decades now that Canaan Valley early on was called the "Canadian Valley", little resembling the biblical Canaan's land of "milk and honey". That speculation is based on arguments that the valley looks very similar to Canada and was first described by early expeditions into its wild, nearly impenetrable wilderness as a place suffix to strike terror into the hearts of men, not being fit for man or beast, and as harboring the dark River of Styx (River of the Dead), now called less frighteningly, the Blackwater River. Furthermore, the name "Canaan" is strikingly similar to "Canadian", with Canaan only missing only two letters (d & i) to spell "Canadian".

== Geography ==
The Valley, nestled among the higher backbone ranges of the Allegheny Mountains, is about 13 miles (21 km) long and 3 to 5 miles (4.8 to 8.0 km) wide. It is defined by Canaan Mountain to the west and Cabin Mountain to the east. The northern half of Cabin Mountain is part of the Eastern Continental Divide.

The Valley floor is very flat, encompasses approximately 25,000 acres (although the greater Valley ecosystem is sometimes considered to consist of about 36,000 acres). The average valley floor elevation is 3,200 feet (980 m) above sea level, making it the highest sizable valley east of the Mississippi River. The surrounding mountains extend upward an additional 1,250 ft (380 m) to Weiss Knob (4,450 ft (1,360 m)) on the southeastern rim of the valley.

The Blackwater River originates in the southern end of the Valley among numerous bogs and beaver ponds. The Falls of the Blackwater represent part of a water gap through which the river exits the Valley between Brown and Canaan Mountains before cascading through Blackwater Canyon.

== Geology ==
Canaan Valley — like the very similar Burke's Garden in Virginia — is a southern "muskeg" occupying an anticline valley. The Valley itself is carved into the low dome of sedimentary rock known as the Blackwater Anticline, exposing the soft shales of the Mauch Chunk Formation. In the Canaan Valley region, the Blackwater River began carving into the underlying sedimentary rock layers of Mississippian and Pennsylvanian age (345–270 million years ago) about one million years ago. The hard, erosion-resistant Pottsville Formation of sandstones is the higher layer supporting the mountains surrounding Canaan Valley and also constitutes the sharp rim of the nearby Blackwater Gorge. Tombstone-like outcroppings of Greenbrier Limestone are also exposed at places along the Valley floor. A relatively high area within the Valley – the Central Pocono Ridge – is composed of the erosion-resistant Pocono Group sandstone.

== Climate ==
Because of its relatively high elevation of 3,200 feet, Canaan Valley has a cooler, moister climate than surrounding areas at lower altitudes.

Summers are cool and humid with afternoon maximum temperatures averaging in the mid 70s °F. Summer morning minimum temperatures average in the low to mid 50s °F. The average growing season of about 95 days is shorter than in Fairbanks in interior central Alaska. Sub-freezing temperatures in the 20's F (-3 C or lower) have been recorded in all three summer months (Jun, Jul, Aug.).

Winters are typically cold and snowy with an average winter producing 170.2 inches (432 cm) of snowfall. The largest snowfall of 257 inches (650 cm) was recorded in the 1995–96 winter. Even in the mildest of winters, over 5 feet (150 cm) of snow falls. Snow pack usually reaches a maximum depth of about 2 feet (0.61 m) or more in late February. In exceptionally cold snowy winters, packs can exceed 4 feet (1.2 m) in depth in the woods.

Also, because of its topographic shape, almost enclosed basin, and high elevation with surrounding ridges, the valley is prone to some of the most frequent and intense temperature inversions in eastern North America. Fifty F differences have been recorded between the summit rim and the valley floor in only 1,000 feet difference by the relatively new Virginia Tech Canaan Valley mesonet. [ref] Email communications from climate researchers R. Leffler & Professor David Carroll (Virginia Tech). Such extreme temperature inversions can very effectively trap atmospheric pollutants, but luckily no major human sources exist currently in the area.

Due to its proximity to both the warm Gulf of Mexico and frigid interior northern Canada, periods of warm above freezing conditions alternate with frigid temperatures. This results in periods of rain and snow even during the coldest months. This characteristic of the climate normally results in snow depth being lower than it would be without such alternation.

Canaan Valley's elevation and geographic location allow it to receive significant upslope snow (Orographic lift) regularly during the winter, particularly during prolonged periods of northwesterly winds coming off of the Great Lakes. Such synoptic situations can generate prolonged blizzard conditions. Located along the spine of the Central Appalachian Mountains, the Valley is often near the western edge of Nor'easters, occasionally getting blizzards from strong, Atlantic moisture-laden, easterly winds.

Climate data for Canaan Valley #2, West Virginia, 1991–2020 normals, extremes 1944–present: 3254ft (992m)
Month	Jan	Feb	Mar	Apr	May	Jun	Jul	Aug	Sep	Oct	Nov	Dec	Year
Record high °F (°C)	70 (21)	72 (22)	80 (27)	85 (29)	87 (31)	95 (35)	98 (37)	97 (36)	95 (35)	83 (28)	76 (24)	76 (24)	98 (37)
Mean maximum °F (°C)	57.0 (13.9)	58.7 (14.8)	67.9 (19.9)	77.7 (25.4)	80.3 (26.8)	82.6 (28.1)	84.3 (29.1)	83.2 (28.4)	81.2 (27.3)	74.5 (23.6)	68.2 (20.1)	58.3 (14.6)	85.1 (29.5)
Mean daily maximum °F (°C)	33.6 (0.9)	37.1 (2.8)	45.2 (7.3)	58.5 (14.7)	66.7 (19.3)	73.9 (23.3)	76.8 (24.9)	75.8 (24.3)	70.3 (21.3)	60.0 (15.6)	47.5 (8.6)	37.9 (3.3)	56.9 (13.9)
Daily mean °F (°C)	25.4 (−3.7)	28.0 (−2.2)	35.2 (1.8)	46.8 (8.2)	55.7 (13.2)	63.0 (17.2)	66.4 (19.1)	64.9 (18.3)	58.9 (14.9)	48.6 (9.2)	37.9 (3.3)	29.8 (−1.2)	46.7 (8.2)
Mean daily minimum °F (°C)	17.3 (−8.2)	18.8 (−7.3)	25.1 (−3.8)	35.2 (1.8)	44.8 (7.1)	52.1 (11.2)	56.0 (13.3)	54.0 (12.2)	47.4 (8.6)	37.2 (2.9)	28.4 (−2.0)	21.7 (−5.7)	36.5 (2.5)
Mean minimum °F (°C)	−8.8 (−22.7)	−4.5 (−20.3)	2.5 (−16.4)	16.9 (−8.4)	27.6 (−2.4)	35.3 (1.8)	40.8 (4.9)	40.2 (4.6)	31.4 (−0.3)	21.1 (−6.1)	9.8 (−12.3)	0.2 (−17.7)	−11.8 (−24.3)
Record low °F (°C)	−27 (−33)	−26 (−32)	−19 (−28)	−2 (−19)	14 (−10)	24 (−4)	27 (−3)	25 (−4)	18 (−8)	5 (−15)	−14 (−26)	−21 (−29)	−27 (−33)
Average precipitation inches (mm)	4.83 (123)	4.49 (114)	4.85 (123)	4.88 (124)	5.43 (138)	5.36 (136)	5.81 (148)	4.39 (112)	3.91 (99)	3.67 (93)	3.72 (94)	4.86 (123)	56.2 (1,427)
Average snowfall inches (cm)	38.6 (98)	34.7 (88)	26.8 (68)	8.0 (20)	0.2 (0.51)	0.0 (0.0)	0.0 (0.0)	0.0 (0.0)	0.0 (0.0)	1.4 (3.6)	9.2 (23)	28.7 (73)	147.6 (374.11)
Average extreme snow depth inches (cm)	15.0 (38)	15.5 (39)	15.5 (39)	4.0 (10)	0.0 (0.0)	0.0 (0.0)	0.0 (0.0)	0.0 (0.0)	0.0 (0.0)	0.9 (2.3)	5.0 (13)	11.4 (29)	23.4 (59)
Average precipitation days (≥ 0.01 in)	20.7	16.9	17.7	15.6	16.9	14.7	15.6	14.7	12.3	11.6	12.9	19.0	188.6
Average snowy days (≥ 0.1 in)	13.4	11.0	8.7	3.0	0.3	0.0	0.0	0.0	0.0	0.5	3.8	10.2	50.9
Source 1: NOAA
Source 2: XMACIS (snowfall, temp records & monthly max/mins)

Climate data for Canaan Mountain, West Virginia (Davis 3SE), 2002–2020 normals, extremes 2002–present
Month	Jan	Feb	Mar	Apr	May	Jun	Jul	Aug	Sep	Oct	Nov	Dec	Year
Record high °F (°C)	62 (17)	71 (22)	74 (23)	84 (29)	83 (28)	89 (32)	89 (32)	84 (29)	84 (29)	80 (27)	72 (22)	64 (18)	89 (32)
Mean maximum °F (°C)	55.5 (13.1)	56.1 (13.4)	66.4 (19.1)	76.7 (24.8)	79.9 (26.6)	81.9 (27.7)	83.3 (28.5)	81.1 (27.3)	80.5 (26.9)	74.7 (23.7)	67.3 (19.6)	58.1 (14.5)	84.3 (29.1)
Mean daily maximum °F (°C)	31.9 (−0.1)	34.9 (1.6)	42.9 (6.1)	55.8 (13.2)	64.4 (18.0)	71.5 (21.9)	75.3 (24.1)	73.6 (23.1)	68.1 (20.1)	57.3 (14.1)	45.7 (7.6)	36.4 (2.4)	54.8 (12.7)
Daily mean °F (°C)	23.9 (−4.5)	26.2 (−3.2)	33.5 (0.8)	45.0 (7.2)	54.6 (12.6)	62.2 (16.8)	66.0 (18.9)	64.4 (18.0)	58.8 (14.9)	47.8 (8.8)	37.2 (2.9)	28.8 (−1.8)	45.7 (7.6)
Mean daily minimum °F (°C)	15.9 (−8.9)	17.5 (−8.1)	24.0 (−4.4)	34.3 (1.3)	44.9 (7.2)	52.8 (11.6)	56.6 (13.7)	55.2 (12.9)	49.5 (9.7)	38.4 (3.6)	28.7 (−1.8)	21.2 (−6.0)	36.6 (2.6)
Mean minimum °F (°C)	−5.6 (−20.9)	−4.8 (−20.4)	4.4 (−15.3)	18.3 (−7.6)	28.9 (−1.7)	39.8 (4.3)	46.1 (7.8)	45.7 (7.6)	37.9 (3.3)	24.3 (−4.3)	12.1 (−11.1)	3.8 (−15.7)	−8.6 (−22.6)
Record low °F (°C)	−18 (−28)	−15 (−26)	−9 (−23)	5 (−15)	19 (−7)	32 (0)	40 (4)	41 (5)	32 (0)	20 (−7)	0 (−18)	−10 (−23)	−18 (−28)
Average precipitation inches (mm)	6.20 (157)	5.28 (134)	5.90 (150)	5.31 (135)	5.70 (145)	6.21 (158)	6.27 (159)	4.49 (114)	4.07 (103)	4.09 (104)	4.12 (105)	5.52 (140)	63.16 (1,604)
Average snowfall inches (cm)	45.0 (114)	43.1 (109)	26.0 (66)	10.6 (27)	0.5 (1.3)	0.0 (0.0)	0.0 (0.0)	0.0 (0.0)	0.0 (0.0)	5.5 (14)	11.2 (28)	28.3 (72)	170.2 (431.3)
Average precipitation days (≥ 0.01 in)	22.6	19.8	18.2	16.3	17.4	15.3	15.2	13.9	10.9	14.2	14.3	19.5	197.6
Average snowy days (≥ 0.1 in)	16.4	14.8	9.7	3.7	0.6	0.0	0.0	0.0	0.0	1.6	5.8	12.1	64.7
Source: NOAA

== History ==
=== Prehistory and settlement ===
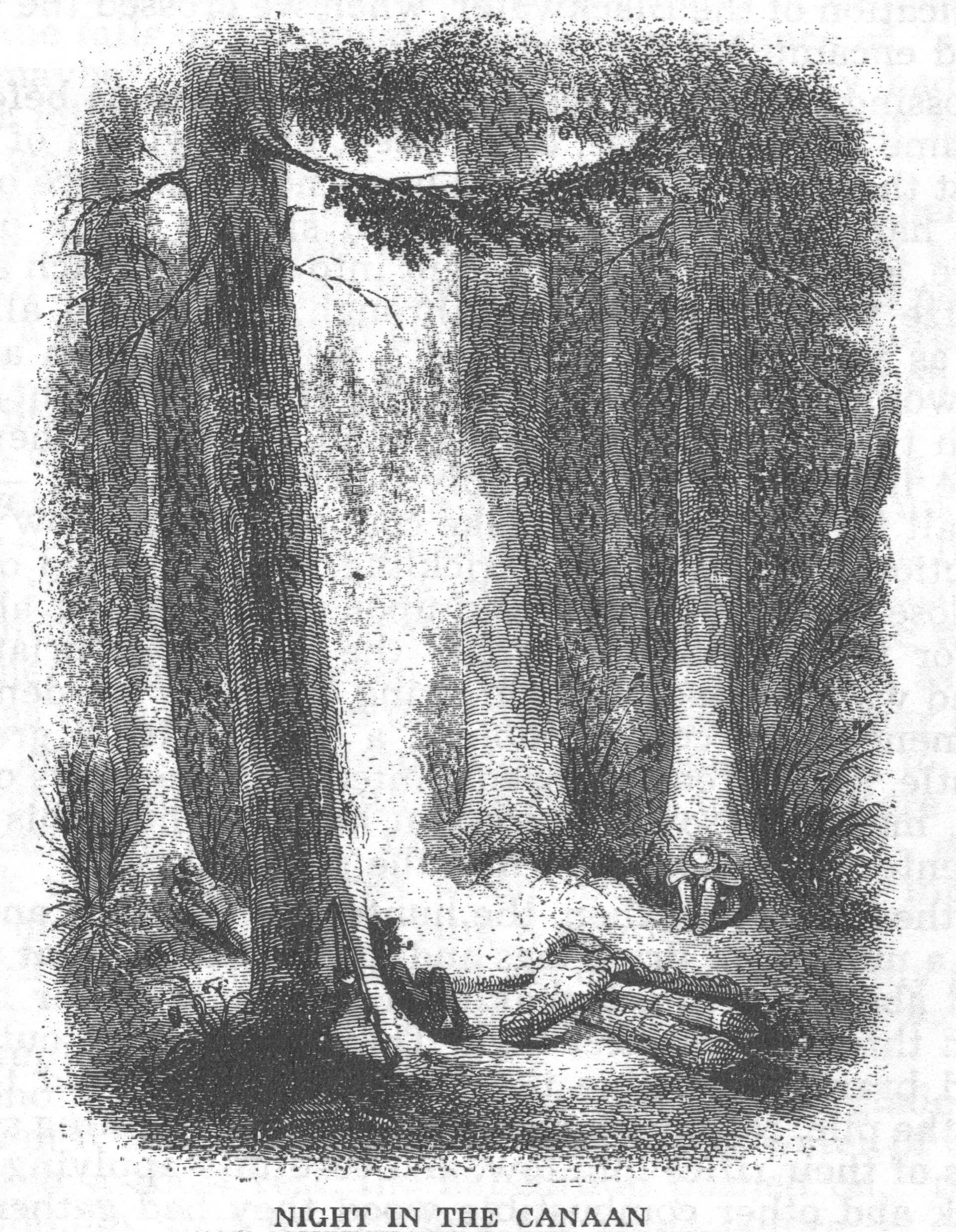
David Hunter Strother's 1853 engraving "Night in the Canaan". No trace of the great primeval red spruce forest remains today.

Canaan Valley and surrounding areas were strongly impacted by the southward advance of glaciers some 15,000 years ago. Although the glaciers themselves did not extend this far south into the area, this climatic change resulted in a very cool, moist environment that was forest-unfriendly. Later, as the ice receded, many cold-adapted plant species remained behind and survived due to the high elevation. Soon, however, this tundra-like vegetation was largely crowded out by the growth of an extraordinarily dense climax red spruce forest, intermixed with balsam fir and hardwoods.

The first Europeans to see Canaan Valley were likely the surveyors of the famous Fairfax Line who crossed Canaan Mountain in 1746 under conditions of extreme difficulty.

The origins of Canaan Valley's name are controversial. According to local legend, a German settler named Henry Fansler, who was migrating from the Shenandoah Valley, viewed the valley from Cabin Mountain in April, 1748 and exclaimed "Besiehe das Land Canaan" ["Behold the Land of Canaan"] ^{:593} However, numerous early documented accounts of the Valley (as discussed in the previous paragraph above) describe it as being just the opposite, a nightmarish landscape..."gloomy, foreboding", with extremely difficult access in the 1700s. In fact, the first documented description of the Valley only 2 years prior to Harness's supposed 1748 proclamation stated that it was so wild and forbidding that it was "sufficient to strike terror into any human or creature". Furthermore, the river emptying the Valley (now called the Blackwater) was called the River of Styx, meaning River of the Dead. This dark history, along with the Valley's cold, snowy climate and eastern Canadian-like forest and landscapes, have led some to theorize that the original name was actually "the Canadian Valley".

Fansler and his family hacked out a living on Freeman Creek in the Valley for three years before the harsh winters and poor farming potential forced them to move to the mouth of the Blackwater a few miles away. Fansler was the first Canaan settler whose name is known, although there is known to have been an earlier abortive homesteader in the 1770s or '80s who left descendants elsewhere in the county.^{:378}

The rugged and remote "High Allegheny" region (what is now east-central West Virginia), including the Valley, was bypassed by development for many decades. As large-scale settlement occurred to its north, south and west the region remained relatively wild. In the 19th Century, the Valley was a last refuge for many of the large mammal species that were being exterminated from the eastern United States. In about 1843, for example, three elk were killed in Canaan Valley by members of the Flanagan and Carr families, local settlers who habitually hunted there. These were likely the last elk found wild in the region that later became West Virginia.

The earliest settler to make a successful and permanent livelihood in the Valley came more than 60 years after Fansler when Solomon W. Cosner began living at Fansler's old homestead in 1864.^{:378-379} The country was described at that time as one of "... original forests [which ...] is swampy, but, as soon as the timber is removed, the water dries up ... Water stands in horse tracks in the woods." Cosner, a Civil War veteran known as the "Pioneer of Canaan", was a noted bear hunter. He and his sons were said to have killed more than 500 bears in Canaan Valley (as well as countless deer, two panthers and a wolf). Other families arrived to settle in the Valley in the 1870s.

In 1883, a Virginia adventurer, former Texas cowboy and land speculator named Charles R. Ruffin bought 5,000 acres (20 km^{2}) of the Valley and organized the "Canaan Valley Blue Grass & Improvement Company", but his scheme to create a vast and profitable cattle ranch came to nothing.^{:488-489,}^{:595}

=== Logging and wildfires ===
Logging of the surrounding mountains was extensive in the 1880s and '90s, but impenetrable understories of rhododendron made passage through the Valley floor almost impossible until the advent of a logging railroad in 1915. The productivity of the timber stands extracted from the Valley floor between 1888 and 1922 (when the last virgin timber was removed) was twice that of similar stands within the state. Maurice Brooks described the ensuing environmental damage in his classic book on Appalachian natural history:

Canaan Valley had a tragic history, and its comeback has been a slow one. A hundred years ago valley and surrounding ridges were covered by red spruce forest of a density that is hard to imagine today. Under such a forest the sun never reached to ground level, humus accumulated through the ages, and fire was not a threat. The lumbermen came, ultimately, and if total and permanent destruction of the entire area had been an aim it could scarcely have been more fully realized. An official of the company boasted that in 100,000 acres (400 km^{2}) they had not left one stick of timber that would make a two-by-four. Log yields were fantastic; some land on the valley floor scaled 80,000 board feet (200 m^{3}) to 100,000 board feet (200 m^{3}) of lumber ... With all cover removed, organic material at ground level began to dry out; soon it was high-grade fuel, and the inevitable fires got started. There followed such a ground fire as this state has never seen before or since. For months this humus layer smoldered, and neither rains nor snows could stop the fire's slow advance. The village of Davis was saved by a series of deep trenches around it, these kept filled with water carried from the Blackwater River. When the destruction was complete, all vegetable matter that wasn't soaked had burned ... Bare rocks remained, and thin mineral soil, this often several feet lower than ground level in the original forest. Canaan and environs had become a desert. I have often wondered if the Pittsburgh company responsible for this has been proud of its job, and if it has enjoyed the resultant wealth.

By the 1920s, the Babcock Lumber and Boom Company had virtually exhausted its commercial prospects in the Valley. In 1923, the West Virginia Power and Transmission Company (WVPTC, later called Allegheny Power Systems), bought 13,230 acres (53.5 km^{2}) in the northern half of the Valley from Babcock with a long-range plan to construct a hydroelectric power plant that would flood much of the Valley^{:212} The WVPTC was not, of course, motivated by any preservationist or environmentalist impulses, but this land purchase was decisive for the fate of the Valley and the power company proved an unwitting guardian of the natural wetlands from development. According to Michael—a wildlife biologist with 30 years experience in the Valley—had this purchase not occurred by a public utility at a time when the scientific and environmental value of wetland was not yet recognized, the northern Valley would undoubtedly have been drained and developed by commercial and private interests in the 1950s and '60s, as happened in the southern Valley.

Serious accidents, even fatal ones, were not uncommon in the logging industry in West Virginia in its heyday. A particularly noteworthy one occurred on 5 February 1924 in Canaan Valley when Babcock's Engine #4 wrecked and killed superintendent Fred V. Viering.

=== Recovery and development ===
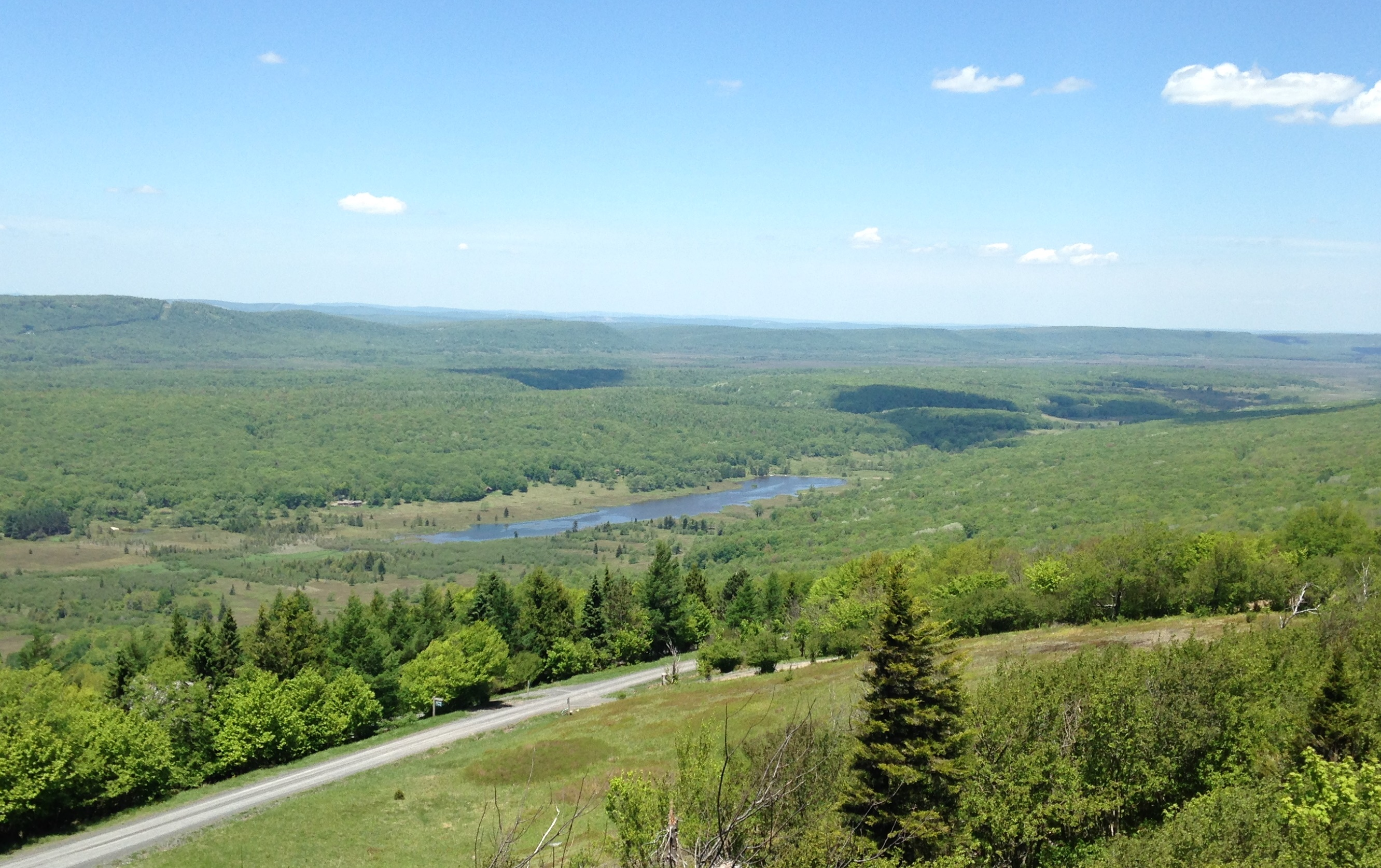
View of the northern half of Canaan Valley from atop Harman Knob.

In 1920, the southern third of the Valley was included in the newly established Monongahela National Forest, the first attempt to restore the forests that the previous generation had cut down. The logging railroads in the Valley were abandoned, then the rails were pulled up in 1925. The outside world intruded again in 1932, however, in the form of West Virginia Route 32 which bisects the southern end of the Valley, connecting Davis to Harman. This is the only north–south highway in the Valley and it was along this route that the later development of the 20th century occurred. Electrification came to this part of the Valley in 1938.^{:221}

In the late 1930s, the Civilian Conservation Corps undertook as one of its projects the reforestation of Canaan Mountain. In areas where there was no soil at all to work with, trucks were run from the Valley continuously bringing dark muck soil to the mountaintop. Spruce seedlings were packed in, each requiring a bushel or two of soil, and by the 1940s a new spruce forest had been established on the slopes overlooking the Valley. In 1943–44, as part of the West Virginia Maneuver Area, the U.S. Army used the Canaan Valley area as a practice artillery and mortar range and maneuver area before troops were sent to European Theater of Operations to fight in World War II.

Beginning in 1950, the Ski Club of Washington, DC was developing ski slopes on the Valley side of Bald Knob of Cabin Mountain^{:595-596} Within the decade, a 3,600-foot (1,100 m) slope on Cabin Mountain and a 3,900 feet (1,200 m) slope on Weiss Knob had been developed. Because of its protection from the sun, snow on that side of the mountain often remains until April or later.

In the early 1970s, Canaan Valley Resort State Park was created at the southern end of the Valley in an attempt to further develop a ski industry in the state. An 18-hole golf course was also constructed there at this time.

=== Controversy and preservation ===
In 1970, Allegheny Power requested permits for the long-anticipated hydroelectric facility in the Valley. This power plant would have supplied electricity to major metropolitan areas of the northeastern United States. The proposal involved damming the Blackwater River with consequent flooding of about 8,000 acres (32 km^{2}), including all of the wetland — roughly 25% of the Valley floor. Public objections were raised and, in the midst of the furor, the Valley was designated a National Natural Landmark by the U.S. Department of the Interior in December 1974. In 1977, the Federal Power Commission issued a license to Allegheny for construction of a pumped storage hydroelectric project, formally known as the Davis Power Project. Contentious public hearings ensued and the following year the project was denied a Clean Water Act permit by the U.S. Army Corps of Engineers. The Corps' decision cited adverse impacts upon the Valley's wetlands, a relatively new concept at the time. Allegheny appealed the Corps' decision to the U.S. Court of Appeals which ruled that a Clean Water Act permit was in fact required for work to commence. The adverse ruling by the appeals court was itself appealed to the U.S. Supreme Court which in 1988 declined to hear the case. This represented the final nail in the coffin of the Davis Power Project.^{:221-222}

In 1994, about 86 acres (350,000 m^{2}) of the Valley were purchased by the U.S. Fish and Wildlife Service to establish a National Wildlife Refuge, the nation's 500th. In 2002, Allegheny – having kept development of most of the Valley at bay since its 1923 land purchase – finally sold its 12,000 acres (49 km^{2}) to the government to be added to the Refuge. With additional acquisitions, the present Canaan Valley National Wildlife Refuge is almost 17,000 acres (69 km^{2}) in extent.

== Ecology ==
=== Wetlands and boreal plants ===
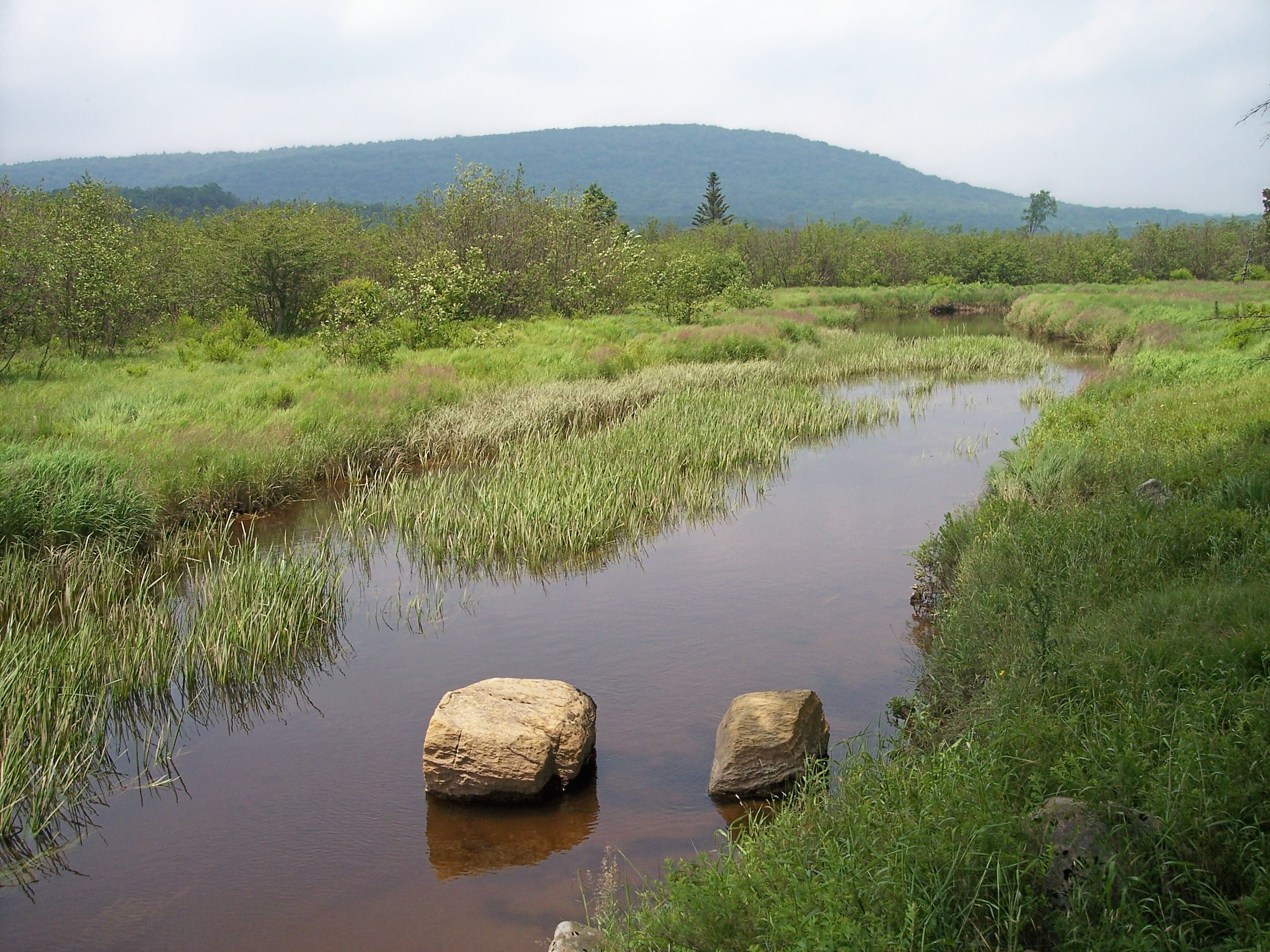
The Blackwater River in Canaan Valley Resort State Park

Canaan Valley shares much of the plant and animal life characteristic of the rest of the state, but its 40 botanical communities also include species otherwise found only in sub-arctic bogs and conifer forests much further north. It has been described by ecologists and conservationists as "a bit of Canada gone astray". The Valley includes several habitat types, but particularly noteworthy are its extensive wetlands, which are the largest in the entire central and southern Appalachian region; they form the second largest inland wetland area in the United States. These 8,400 or so acres of shrub swamp and bog represent approximately 40% of the wetland found in the state of West Virginia.

=== Flora ===
Over 580 plant species have been documented in the Valley, notably various mosses, sedges and heathers, the large cranberry and the Canadian blueberry. Also present are the sundew, marsh marigold, jack-in-the-pulpit, starflower and Canadian lily-of-the-valley. Late August experiences impressive blooms of cotton grass, a sedge otherwise found mostly in Alaska and Canada.

=== Fauna ===
More than 280 animal species have been recorded in the Valley.

Mammals
The valley and surrounding highlands provide some of the most southern pockets of snowshoe hare habitat. Other local mammals include beavers, muskrats, raccoons, opossums, and grey and red squirrels. Seen far less frequently are black bears, bobcats, coyotes, and red foxes. Of special note are large groups of white-tailed deer which can often be seen from the main roads. The deer have become so conditioned to human presence that they are no longer frightened; feeding and interacting with the deer is strongly discouraged.

Birds
Birdlife is prolific, especially those species attracted by the valley's wetlands. These include ducks (wood ducks, mallards, black ducks), Canada geese and the great blue heron. These wetlands are the southernmost nesting site for the American bittern. Notable migratory songbirds finding seasonal homes in the valley include the golden-winged warbler, scarlet tanager, indigo bunting, and Canada warbler. Raptors include red-tailed hawks, goshawks and the occasional peregrine falcon and bald eagle.

Fish
Smallmouth bass and various other sunfish are found in the upper Blackwater River. Native brook trout and introduced rainbow trout are also found in some of the cold, clean streams of the area.

== Tourism and recreation ==
The Valley's unique climatic and natural features attract a steady flow of outdoor recreationalists. Camping, hiking, fishing (trout, bass), cross-country and downhill skiing, leaf-peeping, and wildlife viewing are popular outdoor activities. Upland game bird hunting (woodcock, ruffed grouse, common snipe, wild turkey) has long been popular in the Valley and is still permitted, even in the NWR, within season.

In addition to the two state parks and one wildlife refuge, the valley is home to two Alpine ski resorts (Canaan Valley Ski Resort and Timberline Mountain) and one Nordic ski area (White Grass Ski Touring Center).

== See also ==
- List of National Natural Landmarks
- List of National Natural Landmarks in West Virginia
