= Herman August Meyer House =

Historic house in West Virginia, United States

- U.S. National Register of Historic Places
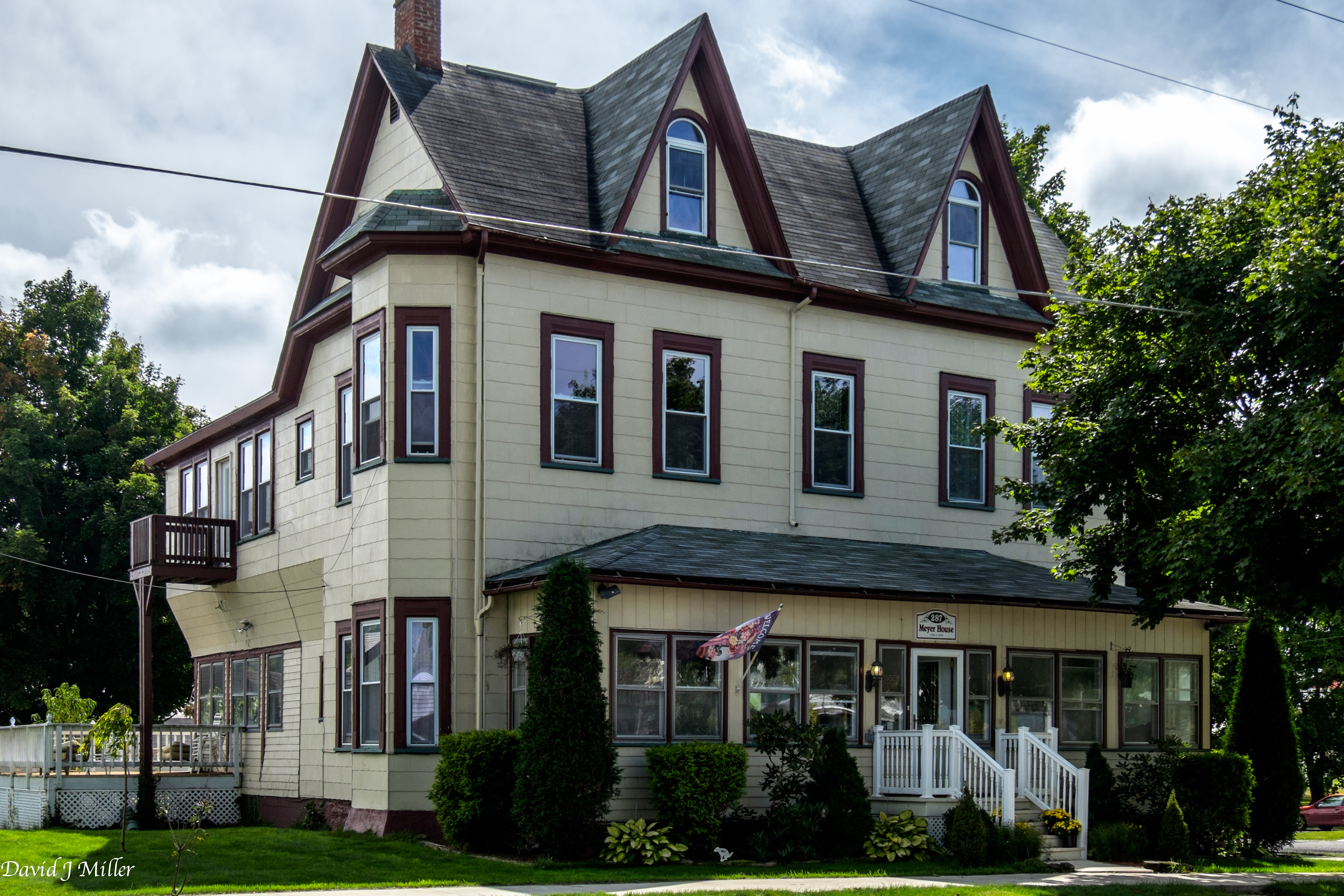
- M

- Location within West Virginia Location within the United States
- Location: 287 Thomas Ave., Davis, West Virginia
- Coordinates: 39°7′49″N 79°27′48″W
- Area: less than one acre
- Built: 1891
- Architectural style: I-house
- NRHP reference No.: 09001195
- Added to NRHP: July 15, 2010

Herman August Meyer House is a historic home located at Davis, Tucker County, West Virginia. It was built about 1891, and is a 2 1/2-story, T-shaped, 5-bay central-passage I house of wood construction. It was built as a single-family residence, and converted for use as a bed and breakfast inn. Also on the property is a domestic dependency, built about 1891.

It was listed on the National Register of Historic Places in 2010.
