= Parsons station =

- Western Maryland Depot
- U.S. National Register of Historic Places
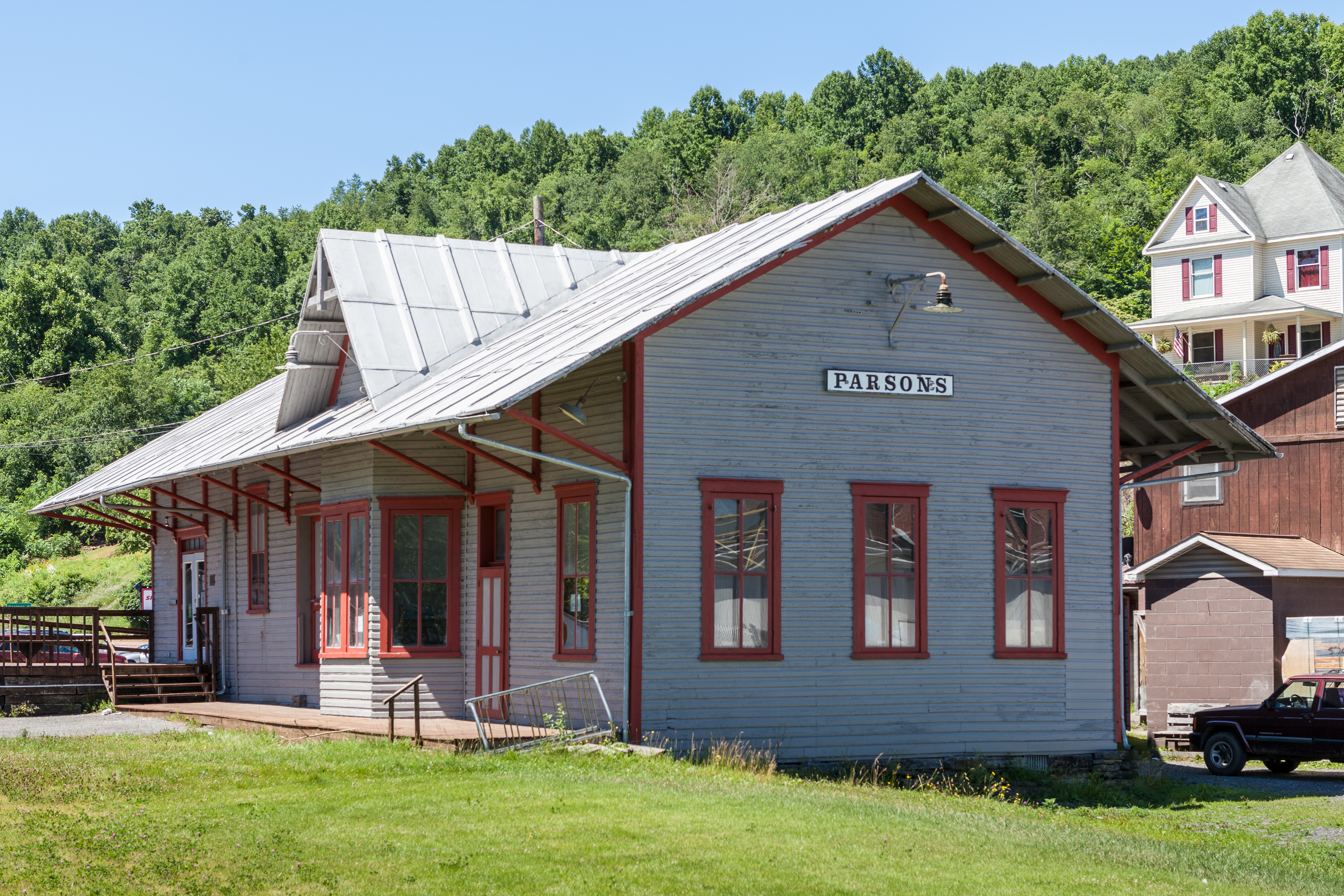
- North and east sides, July 2014

- Location within West Virginia Location within the United States
- Location: 166 1/2 Main St., Parsons, West Virginia
- Coordinates: 39°5′44″N 79°40′50″W
- Area: 0.3 acres (0.12 ha)
- Built: 1888
- Architectural style: Stick/Eastlake
- NRHP reference No.: 96000444
- Added to NRHP: May 2, 1996

Parsons station is a historic railroad depot located at Parsons, West Virginia. It was built by the Western Maryland Railroad in 1888, and is a one-story frame building in the Eastlake movement / Stick Style. It is a simple rectangle measuring 70 feet long and 24 feet wide, with a 12 foot wide, three-sided bay. It features German siding and a batten seam gable roof.

It was listed on the National Register of Historic Places in 1996 as the Western Maryland Depot.

Preceding station	Western Maryland Railway	Following station
Porterwood toward Elkins	Cumberland – Elkins	Hambleton toward Cumberland
