= Tornado outbreak and derecho of June 21–22, 2026 =

Severe weather event in the United States

- Clockwise from top: Map of confirmed tornadoes, severe thunderstorm warnings, and tornado warnings during the event; A mobile home that was completely destroyed by an EF2 tornado east of Sedgwick, Kansas, where one person was killed; Radar imagery of a deadly EF3 tornado near Dix, Illinois; Significant damage to a home in rural Campbell County, Wyoming, following an EF2 tornado; An EF1 tornado near Louisville, Illinois

Meteorological history
- Duration: June 21–22, 2026

Tornado outbreak
- Tornadoes: 66 confirmed
- Max. rating: EF3 tornado
- Duration: 1 day, 17 hours, and 38 minutes
- Highest winds: Tornadic – 140 mph (230 km/h) (Dix, Illinois EF3 on June 21)
- Highest gusts: Non-tornadic – 102 mph (164 km/h) in Hinton, Oklahoma on June 22

Overall effects
- Fatalities: 3
- Injuries: 8
- Damage: >$10 million (2026 USD) (Note: Some tornadoes, such as the EF3 tornado near Dix, Illinois, are not included in this estimate.)
- Part of the Tornadoes of 2026

From June 21–22, 2026, a significant and fatal tornado outbreak, accompanied by a derecho, occurred across the United States, with the majority of activity concentrated in Illinois and Indiana. This outbreak was the third major outbreak to impact Illinois and Indiana in June 2026, succeeding a major outbreak on June 11 and another outbreak on June 17.

In the early morning on June 21, a very short-lived but strong high-end EF2 tornado completely destroyed a double-wide mobile home north of Wichita, Kansas, killing one person and injuring another. In the afternoon and evening hours, numerous tornadoes took place across southeastern Illinois and southwestern Indiana, with a pair of EF2 tornadoes inflicting significant damage to trees and outbuildings near Newton, Illinois. A low-end EF3 tornado tracked around 15 miles in areas just north of Mount Vernon, Illinois. This tornado destroyed several mobile homes, killing two people and injuring five others. An EF2 tornado occurred near Fort Branch, Indiana, tearing the roof off a home and destroying a church. Tornadic activity continued into the overnight hours, with an EF1 tornado causing an entrapment at a retirement community and injuring two people after tracking through areas east of Evansville and north of Newburgh, Indiana.

On June 22, various tornadoes touched down, including a morning EF2 tornado spawned by a damaging derecho that struck northwestern portions of El Reno, Oklahoma, damaging several homes. In the afternoon, another EF2 tornado tracked near Savageton, Wyoming, snapping over a dozen power poles and severely damaging a residence. During the two days, a total of 66 tornadoes touched down across 13 states, killing three people and injuring seven others.

Alongside the tornadoes and derecho, widespread flooding was reported, with some areas having numerous roads and the first floor of residences flooded. Damaging thunderstorm winds inflicted millions of USD in damages, with tens of thousands of power outages and widespread damage being reported across the country.

== Meteorological synopsis ==
=== June 21 ===
==== Forecasting ====
June 20, 2026 Day 2 06:00 UTC Categorical Outlook

June 20, 2026 Day 2 06:00 UTC Probabilistic Tornado Outlook

On June 20, 2026, the Storm Prediction Center outlined a Day 2 slight risk for a large portion of the central United States, stretching from western Indiana and western Kentucky to northeastern Colorado and southwestern Nebraska. A 5% CIG1 probability for tornadoes within 25 miles (40 km) of a point was outlined for portions of central-eastern Missouri and southern Illinois, as a large MCS was forecasted to form over eastern Kansas and Missouri, before tracking eastward throughout the day and reaching the Ohio Valley by the afternoon hours. An outflow boundary was likely to be left behind by the MCS, stretching across central-eastern Missouri and southern Illinois, and along with potential atmospheric destabilization recovery, supported a tornado threat in Missouri, Illinois, and possibly southwestern Indiana. On June 21, 2026, at 1:00 a.m. CDT (06:00 UTC), the 5% CIG1 probability for tornadoes within 25 miles (40 km) of a point was expanded to include portions of southwestern Indiana and a small part of southeastern Kansas, as an MCV over Kansas was expected to track through central and northern Missouri into the Midwest and Ohio Valley by the evening.

Alongside the MCV, a surface low was expected to move across parts of central Missouri and Illinois while deepening along a front, and with high atmospheric moisture and sufficient low-level wind shear, supported the development of a storm cluster with embedded supercells and mesovortices. A strong tornado threat was possible if any supercells sustained themselves for a long enough duration. Additionally, strong heating and sufficient deep-layer shear supported a threat for all severe hazards from south-central Missouri into the lower Ohio Valley. At 8:00 a.m. CDT (13:00 UTC), the Storm Prediction Center maintained a 5% CIG1 probability for tornadoes within 25 miles (40 km) of a point in the newly released outlook, after initially considering an upgrade within a small corridor across Missouri, Illinois, and Indiana. However, much uncertainty remained with how much atmospheric instability would take place in the afternoon following a series of morning storms. Throughout the morning, an MCS with a parent MCV extended across portions of central Missouri into northern Oklahoma and southeastern Kansas. An outflow boundary emitting from this system was likely to have storms form along it throughout the afternoon, and, despite the uncertainty with instability, it was likely that at least moderate instability would be available in a region with 30–40 knots (56–74 km/h) of deep-layer shear, allowing for supercellular development. An eastward low-level jet was expected to strengthen the low-level shear, creating a greater risk for tornadoes, with the possibility of a strong tornado occurring. Additionally, it was likely that the storms would form into multiple clusters in the lower Ohio Valley throughout the evening and early morning hours, increasing the risk for damaging winds.

June 21, 2026 Day 1 20:00 UTC Categorical Outlook

June 21, 2026 Day 1 20:00 UTC Probabilistic Tornado Outlook

At 11:30 p.m. CDT (16:30 UTC), the Storm Prediction Center reduced the size of the 5% CIG1 probability area in southeastern Missouri, being adjusted to include only portions of south-central to southwest Missouri. However, a 2% CIG1 probability for tornadoes within 25 miles (40 km) of a point remained for the region. A long-lived line of thunderstorms was ongoing within the Midwest, extending from east-central Missouri to southwestern Missouri and northeastern Oklahoma. The line of thunderstorms was tracking into a region where the temperature and moisture of the air was increasing, with dew points around 70 °F (21 °C) and gaps in cloud cover both contributing to considerable CAPE values. Strong low-level shear was present, but the veered nature of the wind increased uncertainty over whether storms developed into supercells or a squall line. At 3:00 p.m. CDT (20:00 UTC), the section of the 5% CIG1 tornado probability area located in Missouri was further reduced to the east, and several strong clusters of thunderstorms formed ahead of the MCS across the Mississippi Valley. The Storm Prediction Center also outlined two areas with a 15% CIG1 probability of damaging winds were outlined, with one being for southeastern Illinois, southern Indiana, and northwestern Kentucky. The second area stretched from eastern Colorado and northwestern Kansas to central-southeastern Oklahoma. Additionally, 15% CIG1 probability for large hail was outlined for southwestern Nebraska, eastern Colorado, western Kansas, and northwestern Oklahoma. Messy convection was expected to continue ahead of the MCV and along a warm front that stretched from eastern Illinois into Indiana, with a mixture of bowing structures and short-lived supercells. Additional storm formation was possible along an outflow boundary in Missouri and eastern Kansas, where conditions supported the possible development of tornadoes. It was likely that all convection would grow upscale into one or more bowing clusters as they tracked across the Ohio Valley during the overnight hours.

==== Event ====
Confirmed tornadoes by Enhanced Fujita rating
EFU	EF0	EF1	EF2	EF3	EF4	EF5	Total
6	17	18	4	1	0	0	46

A map of all warnings issued in Illinois and Indiana on June 21

During the afternoon of June 21, various supercells formed along the boundary over Illinois and Indiana, producing numerous tornadoes, some of them being strong (EF2+). At around 5:00 p.m. (22:00 UTC), a low-pressure area was near St. Louis, Missouri, with a warm front stretching eastward across Illinois and Indiana and a cold front extending to the southwest across Missouri. Moderate levels of instability were available in the area, with MLCAPE values around 2000 J/kg. Additionally, the deep-layer shear was unusually strong for the time of year, at 40–45 knots (74–83 km/h). SRH was at 200–300 m2/s2, and wind shear at 1 km (0.62 mi) above ground level was approximately 25 knots (46 km/h), creating an environment primed for tornado development. Tornadic activity continued throughout the evening as the boundary slowly sank southward, as the environment remained mostly the same, with instability still being relatively high at 10:00 p.m. (03:00 UTC), with MLCAPE values being around 1500 J/kg. This environment alongside assistance from the afternoon MCS boundary led to the development of training supercells that slowly tracked southward throughout the afternoon and evening.

Ring doorbell video of an EF1 tornado in Newburgh, Indiana

During the morning storms on June 21, a very short-lived tornado touched down near Sedgwick, Kansas, obliterating a mobile home at high-end EF2 strength, killing one person and injuring another. Debris were scattered six miles to the northeast, but no other structures were found to be damaged. In the afternoon, an EF2 tornado touched down near Newton, Illinois, completely destroying one outbuilding and inflicting significant damage to trees. Right after the first EF2 tornado lifted, a second one touched down, destroying another outbuilding, flattening crops, and snapping numerous trees before dissipating. An EF3 tornado touched down near Dix, Illinois, tracking eastward and downing a cell tower before completely destroying three homes, leading to the deaths of two people. Along the track, numerous trees were snapped or uprooted. An EF2 tornado near Fort Branch, Indiana, tracked over 11 miles (18 km), snapping power lines and trees before removing the roof from a residence and destroying a church. During the nighttime hours, an EF1 tornado tracked near Newburgh, Indiana, causing damage to several apartments at a retirement community. The tornado injured two people, with one having to go to the hospital after flying debris caused the front wall of an apartment unit to partially collapse inward. In another complex, nearly every building sustained damage, and around 90 people had to be evacuated.

=== June 22 ===
==== Forecasting ====
June 22, 2026 Day 1 01:00 UTC Categorical Outlook

June 22, 2026 Day 1 01:00 UTC Probabilistic Wind Outlook

On June 21 at 8:00 p.m. CDT (01:00 UTC), the Storm Prediction Center outlined an enhanced risk for a narrow area stretching from southwestern Kansas to central Oklahoma, driven by a 30% CIG1 probability of damaging winds. Additionally, a 2% probability of tornadoes within 25 miles (40 km) of a point were outlined for the same areas. Sporadic storm development was ongoing along a boundary extending from northwestern Oklahoma to southeastern Kansas and southwestern Missouri, and despite modest conditions for storms to develop, MLCAPE values of 2500–4000 J/kg and 40 knots (74 km/h) of wind shear allowed for conditional organized storm development. A supercell cluster was tracking through western portions of Kansas, and was expected to grow upscale into a MCS as it moved across southwestern Kansas and northwestern and central Oklahoma during the late evening hours of June 21 and early morning hours of June 22, creating a severe wind threat. This MCS was forecasted to be in a primed environment, with favorable lapse rates, high amounts of atmospheric moisture, sufficient instability, and strong wind shear. At 1:00 a.m. CDT (06:00 UTC) on June 22, three slight risks areas were outlined, along with three areas that had a 2% probability of a tornado within 25 miles (40 km) of a point. The first of these areas stretched from northeastern Wyoming into western Nebraska and northeastern Colorado. Sporadic storm development was expected in this area, as the environment was sufficiently moist and unstable, and along with favorable lapse rates and ample deep-layer wind shear, supported the formation of supercells capable of producing very large hail and a couple tornadoes. The second 2% tornado probability area contained portions of northern Mississippi, northern Alabama, northwestern Georgia, and southern Tennessee, as a morning MCV was forecasted to develop from a MCS over the southern plains and move eastward into a warm environment with sufficient atmospheric moisture and instability, potentially creating a tornado threat with any storms that formed. The third and final area was in the northeastern United States, including portions of New York, Pennsylvania, West Virginia, Maryland, and northern Virginia, along with the entirety of New Jersey and Delaware, as a mid-level shortwave trough was expected to move into the northeastern United States. Although it was indicated that the trough was going to weaken, strong mid-level winds were expected 2.8–3.5 miles (4.5–5.6 km) up in the atmosphere, and along with moderate atmospheric instability and potentially enhanced wind shear, supported the formation of supercells, with some possibly being tornadic.

June 22, 2026 Day 1 16:30 UTC Categorical Outlook

June 22, 2026 Day 1 16:30 UTC Probabilistic Tornado Outlook

At 8:00 a.m. CDT, a 5% probability of tornadoes within 25 miles of a point was introduced to the Day 1 outlook, encompassing small portions of southwestern Nebraska and northeastern Colorado. It was forecasted that moderate levels of atmospheric instability along with 40–50 knots (74–93 km/h) of wind shear and favorable lapse rates created an environment conducive of large hail and a couple of tornadoes, especially in northeastern Colorado, with scattered storms expected to form throughout the area. In the Mid-South and Southeast, the 2% tornado probability was maintained, as a MCS approached throughout the morning, with tornadoes being possible in the afternoon with storms close to the MCV's path in the area with sufficient wind shear and atmospheric instability. Despite persistent cloud cover throughout the day, destabilization of the atmosphere and rising dew points was expected to occur. In the northeast, the 2% tornado probability was also maintained. The shortwave trough, which included the remnant of a potent MCV, remained expected to move into the region from the east. Poor lapse rates were present, which was likely to hinder any destabilization. However, westerly mid-level winds were forecasted to be strong, and along with a large area of rising air in front of the shortwave trough, was expected to form scattered to various thunderstorms. While the main threat was damaging winds, it was possible that a couple tornadoes could form along a warm front in northern New Jersey and across southern Long Island, where wind shear closer to the ground was expected to be the strongest. At 12:30 p.m. CDT, a 5% probability of tornadoes within 25 miles of a point was added to the Southeast, containing a large portion of northern Alabama and a small sliver of southern Tennessee. The remains of an overnight MCS moved into the region, with high atmospheric moisture and instability in the region ahead of the system. A low-level jet associated with the MCV made it possible for storms to produce a tornado or two. In the northeast, large amounts of cloud cover were present, limiting atmospheric destabilization and reducing confidence in where storms would form in the afternoon hours, with the 2% tornado probability being maintained. In southwestern Nebraska and northeastern Colorado, the 5% tornado probability was sustained, as the amount of cloud cover was starting to reduce and sufficient CAPE values and deep-layer shear being expected, promoting the formation of a couple tornadoes and large hail. The strongest wind shear was observed near the Cheyenne Ridge, with this area likely harboring the highest risk for tornadoes.

==== Event ====
Confirmed tornadoes by Enhanced Fujita rating
EFU	EF0	EF1	EF2	EF3	EF4	EF5	Total
5	5	8	2	0	0	0	20

Significant damage to a home in El Reno, Oklahoma

In the pre-dawn hours of June 22, a derecho moved primarily through Oklahoma, with a mesonet site in Hinton measuring a wind gust of 102 mph (164 km/h). Significant damage was reported in the city of Tuttle, with the roof of an apartment building being torn away. In the town of Dibble, a church sustained significant damage to its roof. At least four QLCS tornadoes were produced by this derecho, including three EF1 tornadoes and a mid-range EF2 tornado that damaged several homes in El Reno, including one that had its entire roof torn away. An EF1 tornado tracked over 4 miles (6.4 km) in southeastern portions of the Oklahoma City metro. A second EF1 tornado struck the city of Harrah, inflicting damage to trees and power lines. The third and final EF1 tornado tracked just south of Wetumka. In the afternoon hours, an EF2 tornado tracked over 12 miles (19 km) in Campbell County, Wyoming, snapping power poles and severely damaging a residence. It was the first EF2 tornado to occur in Wyoming since June 23, 2023. Several weak tornadoes also occurred in northern Alabama and southern Tennessee, and a total of four tornadoes touched down in the states of West Virginia, Maryland, and Pennsylvania.

== Confirmed tornadoes ==
Confirmed tornadoes by Enhanced Fujita rating
EFU	EF0	EF1	EF2	EF3	EF4	EF5	Total
11	22	26	6	1	0	0	66

=== June 21 event ===
List of confirmed tornadoes – Sunday, June 21, 2026 (Note: All dates are based on the local time zone where the tornado touched down; however, all times are in Coordinated Universal Time for consistency.)
EF#	Location	County / Parish	State	Start Coord.	Time (UTC)	Path length	Max width
EF2	E of Sedgwick	Sedgwick, Harvey	KS	37.911°N 97.3209°W	06:14–06:16	0.11 mi (0.18 km)	50 yd (46 m)
EF2	1 death — This narrow, brief, but strong high-end EF2 tornado blew away a double-wide manufactured home that was bolted to a poured basement foundation, where one person was killed. Nearby, metal roofing was peeled from an outbuilding that also had part of its gutter ripped off and sustained damage to its rafters, and an unanchored outbuilding sandwiched between two cars was obliterated, with the cars suffering minor damage from flying debris. Additonally, another person was injured. Debris from the home and the two outbuildings was found blown to the northeast up to 6 mi (9.7 km) away.						
EF0	Warson Woods	St. Louis	MO	38.6°N 90.39°W	19:21–19:22	0.88 mi (1.42 km)	10 yd (9.1 m)
EF0	The tornado inflicted minor tree damage.						
EF0	SSW of Stewardson	Shelby	IL	39.2169°N 88.6541°W	20:22–20:24	1.29 mi (2.08 km)	150 yd (140 m)
EF0	Trees and a farm outbuilding were damaged.						
EF1	Louisville	Clay	IL	38.7442°N 88.5178°W	20:30–20:39	4.27 mi (6.87 km)	200 yd (180 m)
EF1	This tornado began south of Louisville and moved northward into the south side of town, removing a large portion of the roof of a business storage building and an attached residence. The tornado weakened slightly as it moved through the town before exiting and re-intensifying northeast of it, where it snapped off power poles and large trees. It then damaged a few more trees before dissipating.						
EFU	W of South Pekin	Tazewell	IL	40.4889°N 89.711°W	20:35–20:36	0.19 mi (0.31 km)	20 yd (18 m)
EFU	A landspout was recorded. No damage occurred.						
EF1	ESE of Neoga	Cumberland	IL	39.3055°N 88.4332°W	20:43–20:44	0.85 mi (1.37 km)	75 yd (69 m)
EF1	A few farm outbuildings and trees were damaged.						
EF0	N of Vernon	Fayette, Marion	IL	38.8257°N 89.0947°W	20:49–20:52	1.2 mi (1.9 km)	10 yd (9.1 m)
EF0	A storm chaser photographed this tornado as it moved southeastward across US 51 in front of a tree line, where minor tree damage was noted.						
EF0	SE of Bradbury to W of Diona	Cumberland, Coles	IL	39.3098°N 88.2259°W	21:06–21:17	5.89 mi (9.48 km)	150 yd (140 m)
EF0	This tornado tracked northeast, damaging a few farm outbuildings and trees. It then turned east-northeastward and caused more tree damage before lifting.						
EF2	S of Newton	Jasper	IL	38.941°N 88.1743°W	21:07–21:14	3.61 mi (5.81 km)	250 yd (230 m)
EF2	This tornado touched down, quickly intensifying as an outbuilding was destroyed. Afterwards, the tornado weakened, snapping and delimbing trees. The tornado crossed IL 130, snapping numerous trees along the highway. The tornado reached its peak intensity shortly thereafter, debarking softwood trees, destroying a block outbuilding, snapping and delimbing multiple other trees, and leaving power poles leaning.						
EF2	E of Newton to W of Willow Hill	Jasper	IL	38.9717°N 88.1161°W	21:15–21:18	2.6 mi (4.2 km)	300 yd (270 m)
EF2	Immediately after the dissipation of the first tornado, the parent supercell quickly produced another significant tornado east of Newton. The tornado snapped and uprooted numerous trees, along with snapping power poles and damaging or destroying a couple of outbuildings. The tornado intensified to low-end EF2 intensity, snapping numerous trees in forests south of the Embarras River. The tornado primarily caused moderate tree damage before dissipating.						
EFU	S of Kinmundy	Marion	IL	38.74°N 88.86°W	21:22–21:25	1.32 mi (2.12 km)	
EFU	This tornado had no recorded damage.						
EF1	SE of Farina	Marion	IL	38.7891°N 88.7516°W	21:31–21:36	2.13 mi (3.43 km)	190 yd (170 m)
EF1	This high-end EF1 tornado snapped multiple trees and unroofed an outbuilding.						
EF1	S of Annapolis	Crawford	IL	39.1085°N 87.8583°W	21:36–21:49	6.62 mi (10.65 km)	600 yd (550 m)
EF1	Trees and electrical transmission lines were damaged.						
EF1	SSE of Annapolis	Crawford	IL	39.0974°N 87.8018°W	21:41–21:44	2 mi (3.2 km)	600 yd (550 m)
EF1	This tornado snapped or uprooted multiple trees.						
EF3	SSE of Dix to NNW of Keenes	Jefferson, Wayne	IL	38.404°N 88.9287°W	22:02–22:30	15.26 mi (24.56 km)	400 yd (370 m)
EF3	2 deaths – See section on this tornado – Five people were injured.						
EFU	N of Brewster	Thomas	KS	39.5662°N 101.3599°W	22:12–22:14	0.87 mi (1.40 km)	50 yd (46 m)
EFU	A TDS was noted on radar but not damaged was found.						
EF1	N of Wilfred to Western Hymera	Sullivan	IN	39.1956°N 87.3544°W	22:22–22:27	2.74 mi (4.41 km)	425 yd (389 m)
EF1	The tornado ripped off part of the roof of a barn before causing extensive damage to a grove of trees and three additional structures.						
EF1	W of Birds to SSE of Flat Rock	Lawrence, Crawford	IL	38.8405°N 87.725°W	22:25–22:35	4.25 mi (6.84 km)	300 yd (270 m)
EF1	This tornado snapped or uprooted numerous trees.						
EF0	S of Shobonier	Fayette	IL	38.8382°N 89.1186°W	22:27–22:31	3.41 mi (5.49 km)	25 yd (23 m)
EF0	A tornado was recorded by local broadcast media. A few tree branches were downed.						
EF1	NNE of Sims to WSW of Jeffersonville	Wayne	IL	38.4128°N 88.4953°W	22:47–22:51	1.53 mi (2.46 km)	75 yd (69 m)
EF1	This tornado touched down and damaged a shipping container, a shed, and a barn, as well as uprooting numerous trees along its path. The tornado then lifted moments later.						
EF1	SE of Claremont to SW of Sumner	Richland, Lawrence	IL	38.6871°N 87.948°W	22:53–23:01	3.19 mi (5.13 km)	300 yd (270 m)
EF1	Numerous trees had their branches broken or were snapped or uprooted.						
EF0	S of Patricksburg	Owen	IN	39.297°N 86.9637°W	22:56–22:59	0.92 mi (1.48 km)	25 yd (23 m)
EF0	This brief tornado caused sporadic tree damage, mostly to large tree limbs and small tree trunks.						
EF0	W of Bicknell	Knox	IN	38.7852°N 87.3644°W	23:00–23:02	0.3 mi (0.48 km)	80 yd (73 m)
EF0	Drone footage shows some large tree limbs knocked down and metal roof panels of an outbuilding missing or pulled up. The most serious damage was observed closer to a main road, where tree limbs of several hardwood trees were destroyed, and the roof of an outbuilding was removed.						
EF0	NNE of Golden Gate	Wayne	IL	38.4368°N 88.1751°W	23:37-23:38	0.52 mi (0.84 km)	75 yd (69 m)
EF0	This tornado broke off branches from trees and flattened some corn.						
EF0	WSW of Dover Hill to N of Shoals	Martin	IN	38.7214°N 86.8113°W	23:58–00:04	2.02 mi (3.25 km)	50 yd (46 m)
EF0	A weak tornado developed southwest of Dover Hill before moving southeastward, where a metal barn roof was torn off, and convergence was noted in nearby snapped tree damage.						
EF2	N of Cynthiana to WSW of Francisco	Gibson	IN	38.2231°N 87.7003°W	00:02–00:25	11.52 mi (18.54 km)	300 yd (270 m)
EF2	An EF2 tornado was confirmed by NWS Paducah. Preliminary information.						
EF1	E of Jeffersonville	Wayne	IL	38.4441°N 88.3635°W	00:11–00:21	3.78 mi (6.08 km)	50 yd (46 m)
EF1	A carport was lofted over a barn at one residence and another residence sustained damage from a tree falling on it. Corn was also flattened.						
EF0	SSE of Taylorsville	Bartholomew	IN	39.2686°N 85.9332°W	00:12–00:17	0.49 mi (0.79 km)	85 yd (78 m)
EF0	The tornado touched down east of US 31 and moved northeast through a tree line and corn field. A convergent wind pattern was noted within the cornfield. Large trees were also uprooted or snapped before the tornado lifted.						
EFU	WSW of Edinburg	Christian	IL	39.65°N 89.4305°W	00:27–00:28	0.05 mi (0.080 km)	20 yd (18 m)
EFU	This very brief tornado caused no damage.						
EF1	E of Mackey	Gibson	IN	38.2523°N 87.3834°W	00:38–00:41	1.25 mi (2.01 km)	25 yd (23 m)
EF1	The tornado touched down east of Mackey, snapping and delimbing trees and partially damaging the roof of a mobile home.						
EF1	NE of Lynnville (1st tornado)	Warrick	IN	38.2251°N 87.2866°W	00:47–00:50	0.96 mi (1.54 km)	
EF1	This tornado removed branches from trees and caused power poles to lean.						
EF0	NE of Lynnville (2nd tornado)	Warrick	IN	38.2196°N 87.2525°W	00:52–00:53	0.35 mi (0.56 km)	
EF0	This tornado uprooted or removed limbs from trees.						
EF0	W of Selvin	Warrick	IN	38.21°N 87.18°W	00:57–00:59	0.98 mi (1.58 km)	25 yd (23 m)
EF0	This tornado uprooted several trees.						
EF0	ESE of Eminence to NE of Winona	Shannon	MO	37.1025°N 91.2573°W	01:00–01:03	2.7 mi (4.3 km)	200 yd (180 m)
EF0	This tornado snapped or toppled several trees and blew down doors to an outbuilding.						
EFU	SW of Tower Hill	Shelby	IL	39.3599°N 88.991°W	01:07–01:08	0.11 mi (0.18 km)	20 yd (18 m)
EFU	A trained spotter reported a brief tornado that caused no damage.						
EF1	NW of Dale	Spencer	IN	38.1819°N 87.0069°W	01:15–01:16	0.29 mi (0.47 km)	125 yd (114 m)
EF1	This very brief tornado damaged several turkey barns, caused shingle damage to a home, and uprooted several trees.						
EF1	N of Charlestown	Clark	IN	38.5023°N 85.7199°W	01:50–01:58	3.05 mi (4.91 km)	150 yd (140 m)
EF1	A tornado initially damaged trees and a home before strengthening, uprooting roughly 10 trees within a small area. It then quickly weakened and dissipated just east of SR 3.						
EFU	NE of Enfield	White	IL	38.1464°N 88.2869°W	01:53–01:54	0.21 mi (0.34 km)	25 yd (23 m)
EFU	This very brief tornado caused no damage.						
EF1	NNW of Newburgh	Warrick	IN	37.9792°N 87.4461°W	02:15–02:20	2.95 mi (4.75 km)	75 yd (69 m)
EF1	This tornado touched down north of the Deaconess Gateway Hospital, snapping trees at mid-range EF1 intensity. The tornado then impacted several apartment buildings, causing minimal siding damage. A couple more apartment buildings were impacted afterwards, causing minimal damage. Portions of roofing and HVAC units from a Ruler Foods building were ripped away, and a flagpole was bent. The tornado dissipated shortly afterwards. Two injuries were recorded.						
EF0	N of Brandenburg	Harrison	IN	38.0973°N 86.1953°W	02:53–02:54	0.85 mi (1.37 km)	100 yd (91 m)
EF0	This tornado ripped off the doors to an outbuilding and damaged another one nearby. Multiple trees were also debranched or uprooted.						
EF0	Grandview	Spencer	IN	37.9382°N 87.001°W	03:03–03:04	1.03 mi (1.66 km)	25 yd (23 m)
EF0	This brief tornado inflicted light shingle damage to the home and debranched or uprooted a few trees.						
EF1	NW of Chandler	Warrick	IN	38.057°N 87.3954°W	03:37–03:38	0.51 mi (0.82 km)	50 yd (46 m)
EF1	This short-lived tornado snapped and uprooted several trees and partially removed the roof of an outbuilding.						
EF1	N of Chandler	Warrick	IN	38.050°N 87.390°W	03:39–03:46	2.46 mi (3.96 km)	150 yd (140 m)
EF1	Another tornado touched down in the Chandler area, snapping power poles and dozens of trees at high-end EF1 intensity. Minor roof damage to a home was also noted.						
EF0	Mystic	Breckinridge	KY	37.8992°N 86.4517°W	04:07–04:10	0.92 mi (1.48 km)	50 yd (46 m)
EF0	The brief, likely intermittent tornado directly struck an unoccupied mobile home, flipping it over and damaging its roof. It then moved down a bluff, causing minor tree damage before strengthening slightly and snapping a tree onto a home. The tornado quickly dissipated shortly afterward.						
EF1	W of Webster	Breckinridge	KY	37.8848°N 86.3822°W	04:14–04:17	1.15 mi (1.85 km)	70 yd (64 m)
EF1	A brief tornado quickly intensified as it moved east, destroying a shed by completely removing its roof and most of its walls. Several nearby trees were also snapped at their bases before the tornado quickly dissipated.						
EF0	Hawesville to SE of Cannelton, IN	Hancock	KY	37.895°N 86.7494°W	04:44–04:54	3.49 mi (5.62 km)	100 yd (91 m)
EF0	This tornado began in eastern Hawesville near US 60 and tracked east, closely following the Ohio River and possibly moving briefly over the water before returning to shore. Damage along the path consisted primarily of downed and damaged trees.						

=== June 22 event ===
List of confirmed tornadoes – Monday, June 22, 2026
EF#	Location	County / Parish	State	Start Coord.	Time (UTC)	Path length	Max width
EF2	Western El Reno	Canadian	OK	35.563°N 98.004°W	06:30–06:34	2 mi (3.2 km)	180 yd (160 m)
EF2	This strong tornado initially developed northwest of El Reno and moved southeast, breaking a utility pole before entering a neighborhood. At least two homes lost most of their roofs and sustained partial garage collapses, while numerous other homes suffered varying degrees of roof damage. Trees and fences were also damaged throughout the neighborhood before the tornado dissipated prior to reaching I-40 Bus.						
EF1	Valley Brook	Oklahoma	OK	35.433°N 97.512°W	06:59–07:04	4.6 mi (7.4 km)	100 yd (91 m)
EF1	A QLCS tornado touched down in southeast Oklahoma City and tracked southeast, crossing I-35/US 62/US 77 and moving through Valley Brook, causing roof damage to a number of homes and businesses along its path. Damage was concentrated in several areas before the tornado dissipated after crossing I-240/SH-3.						
EF1	Harrah	Oklahoma, Lincoln	OK	35.502°N 97.194°W	07:12–07:15	3.4 mi (5.5 km)	75 yd (69 m)
EF1	This tornado developed near the North Canadian River and moved southeast through Harrah, damaging trees, power lines, and power poles. It then turned east to east-northeast out of town before crossing into Lincoln County just north of US 62 and dissipating shortly afterward.						
EF1	Wetumka	Hughes	OK	35.229°N 96.301°W	08:10–08:16	5.3 mi (8.5 km)	100 yd (91 m)
EF1	This tornado began just south of SH-9 west of Wetumka and moved east, damaging trees and power lines near the intersection of SH-9 and SH-27. The tornado reached peak intensity southeast of Wetumka, where additional trees and power poles were damaged and several trees were uprooted before the tornado dissipated.						
EF1	Ozark	Franklin	AR	35.495°N 93.878°W	11:16–11:24	3.3 mi (5.3 km)	400 yd (370 m)
EF1	This early morning hours tornado touched down west of the city of Ozark, initially traveling east-northeast. Numerous trees were snapped or uprooted, with some landing onto homes, and an outbuilding was destroyed east of US 64. Then the tornado went through two neighborhoods, snapping and uprooting trees, with homes damaged by tree limbs falling on them. The tornado turned southeast and crossed US 64, snapping more trees and damaging signs. The tornado dissipated shortly after crossing the Arkansas River.						
EF0	N of Larkin	Jackson	AL	34.9265°N 86.2247°W	18:33–18:34	0.54 mi (0.87 km)	100 yd (91 m)
EF0	This tornado touched down north of Larkin, initially inflicting moderate tree damage. It then destroyed a chicken coop and a barn building and uprooted a tree. The tornado continued debranching trees before quickly dissipating.						
EFU	SE of Fort Stockton	Pecos	TX	30.6302°N 102.5802°W	20:05–20:15	2.17 mi (3.49 km)	30 yd (27 m)
EFU	This tornado remained in rural areas. No damage was found.						
EF2	SW of Savageton	Campbell	WY	43.9056°N 105.9689°W	20:31–21:05	12.7 mi (20.4 km)	600 yd (550 m)
EF2	This strong tornado snapped 13 power poles at their bases, and inflicted significant structural damage to at least one home.						
EF1	SE of New Market (1st tornado)	Madison	AL	34.8935°N 86.4468°W	20:58–21:04	5.51 mi (8.87 km)	60 yd (55 m)
EF1	Trees were snapped and softwood trees were debranched.						
EFU	S of Kimball (1st tornado)	Kimball	NE	41.1019°N 103.6786°W	21:01–21:11	0.87 mi (1.40 km)	15 yd (14 m)
EFU	A landspout was observed by storm chasers in an open field. No damage was reported.						
EF0	SE of New Market (2nd tornado)	Madison	AL	34.8924°N 86.3864°W	21:03–21:04	2.75 mi (4.43 km)	30 yd (27 m)
EF0	This satellite tornado to the New Market EF1 tornado snapped power poles and snapped or uprooted trees.						
EFU	S of Kimball (2nd tornado)	Kimball	NE	41.0956°N 103.6778°W	21:05–21:12	0.61 mi (0.98 km)	10 yd (9.1 m)
EFU	Another weak landspout was documented occurring alongside the first landspout. No damage was reported.						
EF1	S of Vanderbilt	Fayette	PA	40.0072°N 79.6794°W	21:14–21:16	1.12 mi (1.80 km)	140 yd (130 m)
EF1	This brief tornado caused mainly tree damage and minor structural damage before lifting.						
EF1	NW of Francisco (1st tornado)	Franklin	TN	34.996°N 86.2596°W	21:18–21:19	0.72 mi (1.16 km)	160 yd (150 m)
EF1	This high-end EF1 tornado snapped and uprooted numerous trees.						
EF0	NW of Francisco (2nd tornado)	Jackson	AL	34.9888°N 86.2502°W	21:18–21:19	0.16 mi (0.26 km)	60 yd (55 m)
EF0	A twin tornado to the first Francisco tornado snapped or uprooted and debranched trees.						
EF0	E of Fairmont	Marion	WV	39.4799°N 80.0648°W	22:11–22:12	0.22 mi (0.35 km)	25 yd (23 m)
EF0	A narrow swath of trees was downed, one falling on a car.						
EF0	W of Mutual	Calvert	MD	38.471°N 76.598°W	23:02–23:04	1.3 mi (2.1 km)	75 yd (69 m)
EF0	Large tree limbs were snapped, including one that fell on a dock.						
EFU	WSW of Fowler	Pueblo, Otero	CO	38.12°N 104.09°W	23:16–23:25	2.40 mi (3.86 km)	
EFU	This landspout tornado remained in open fields.						
EFU	SW of Fowler	Pueblo	CO	38.06°N 104.09°W	23:42–23:47	1.64 mi (2.64 km)	
EFU	This hybrid tornado remained in open fields southwest of the Fowler Airport.						
EF1	NE of Moatsville to W of Kasson	Barbour	WV	39.2219°N 79.9207°W	23:50–23:52	1.13 mi (1.82 km)	275 yd (251 m)
EF1	A barn was destroyed with debris scattered from northwest to southeast of the original structure. A double-wide also sustained siding and window damage. Further along the path, several healthy and mature locust trees were snapped or uprooted.						

=== Dix–Keenesville, Illinois ===
Dix–Keenesville, Illinois
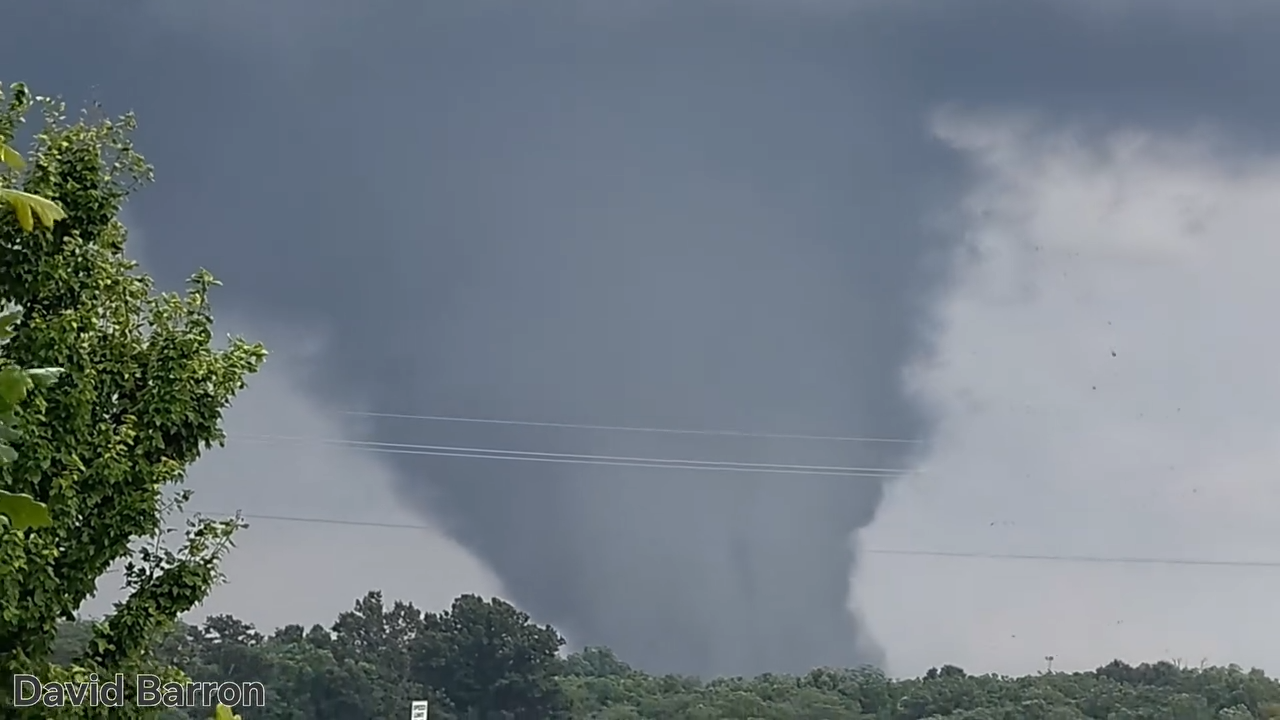
- The tornado as seen near Dix, Illinois

Meteorological history
- Formed: June 21, 2026, 5:02 p.m. CDT (UTC–05:00)
- Dissipated: June 21, 2026, 5:30 p.m. CDT (UTC–05:00)
- Duration: 28 minutes

EF3 tornado
- on the Enhanced Fujita scale
- Highest winds: 140 mph (230 km/h)

Overall effects
- Fatalities: 2
- Injuries: 5
- Damage: Unknown

This deadly and intense tornado first touched down at 5:02 p.m. CDT in Jefferson County along IL 37 and around 2.5 miles (4.0 km) south of Dix, snapping branches off trees at EF0 intensity. The tornado tracked eastward, uprooting a tree along East Violet Road at EF1 intensity before weakening back to EF0 strength. The tornado paralleled East Violet Road to the north, damaging more trees before crossing North Iris Lane, where an outbuilding on the eastern side of the road sustained EF0 damage. The tornado turned slightly northward as it tracked to the north of County Road 1900, crossing 1300 East Road as it inflicted more damage to trees. The tornado then reintensified to EF1 strength as it continued through wooded areas, uprooting and snapping numerous hardwood trees, with many having branches broken off as well. The tornado then reached EF2 intensity as it crossed North Miller Lake Lane south of East Green Acres Road, downing an internet tower towards the north-northwest and snapping more hardwood trees. The tornado then struck an outbuilding on the eastern side of the road at EF1 strength, tearing away portions of the roof.

The tornado crossed Miller Lake, with trees being uprooted along the eastern shoreline. The tornado tracked through more trees, snapping many at the trunk, with others being uprooted and having large branches broken away. The tornado then intensified to high-end EF2 intensity as it tracked just north of East July Road, completely destroying a single-wide mobile home and blowing the debris away, killing a woman. Nearby, numerous pines, hardwoods, and other types of trees were uprooted, snapped, and had branches broken off by the tornado. The tornado tracked across North Hails Lane, uprooting and snapping more hardwood trees at EF1 intensity. The tornado continued through rural areas as it tracked north of East Windsong Road before impacting a residence along the western side of North Tolle Lane, inflicting EF1 damage. The tornado then crossed North Tolle Lane, snapping hardwood trees before crossing North Village Lane, where trees were uprooted and an outbuilding was destroyed at EF1 intensity. The tornado then rapidly intensified to low-end EF3 strength as it approached North Stratford Lane, destroying a single-family home along the western side of the road. In this house, a woman, her daughter, and their three dogs survived. Nearby, numerous trees were snapped or uprooted, and an outbuilding to the south had roof panels torn away.

EF3 damage to a double-wide mobile home, with the frame wrapped around a tree; a woman was killed at this location

The tornado maintained EF3 strength as it struck a double-wide mobile home along the western side of North Ranch Lane, completely destroying it and sweeping the debris away, with nearby trees being snapped at the trunk. An 82-year-old woman was killed at this residence. The tornado began to weaken as it turned more to the southeast, crossing North Moonbeam Lane just south of the North Moonbeam Lane/East Silence Road intersection, snapping and uprooting trees at EF1 intensity. The tornado then approached and struck a property on the western side of North Clear Lane, with the owners seeing the tornado from across a field and managing to drive south before it struck. A mobile home was shifted 8 feet (2.4 m) off its cinderblock foundation, and a camper was tipped over and left uninhabitable. The tornado crossed North Clear Lane, snapping hardwood trees before tracking over North Harmony Lane and downing power poles at EF2 strength, with nearby trees having branches broken off. The tornado passed south of Harmony, tracking just north of East Pinecone Road before snapping and uprooting more trees as it tracked over North Oklahoma Lane. The tornado continued to the southeast, inflicting EF1 damage to more trees as it crossed East Needle Road before weakening to EF0 strength as it tracked over County Road 2400, where trees had large branches snapped off. The tornado crossed County Road 125 East, County Road 200 East, and County Road 900 North before turning more to the east, damaging trees and collapsing the walls of an outbuilding at EF1 strength before dissipating at 5:30 p.m. CDT.

The tornado tracked for 15.26 miles (24.56 km), was on the ground for 28 minutes, and reached a maximum width of 400 yards (0.23 mi; 370 m; 0.37 km). The tornado killed two people along its track, with five others sustaining non-life-threatening injuries and being transported to nearby hospitals. A total of three homes were completely destroyed, with several others sustaining damage.

== Non-tornadic impacts ==
=== Derecho ===
An intense derecho began in eastern Colorado and western Kansas before tracking across Oklahoma and into central Arkansas during the early morning hours of June 22. Stretching over 700 miles (1,100 km), around 83,021 customers were left without power due to the storm, with the majority being in Oklahoma County. A maximum wind gust of 102 mph (164 km/h) was recorded near Hinton, Oklahoma at 1:15 a.m. CST. At least four tornadoes were associated with the derecho in Oklahoma, including an EF2 tornado near El Reno.

The mayor of El Reno declared an emergency disaster proclamation for the city, as around 8–10 homes were damaged by the severe weather, with trees and power lines also being destroyed. In Edmond, Oklahoma, power outages were reported, along with three structures being caught on fire due to lightning strikes and the Oklahoma Christian Academy suffering roof damage. Power lines were downed and a home and a couple of businesses sustained damage in Fairview, Oklahoma, and several barns and carports were demolished near Wetumka, Oklahoma. In Tuttle, Oklahoma, an apartment building had its roof town away by damaging winds, leading to the displacement of multiple families and flooding and water damage throughout the structure. Across central portions of Oklahoma, nearly 100 power poles were downed and 28 transformers were damaged, with some of the worst-affected areas being The Village, Nichols Hills, Del City, and Midwest City.

The Kickapoo Tribe of Oklahoma Emergency Management reported damage to power poles and transformers at one of their administration buildings, along with moderate roof damage at their mental health building located in McLoud, Oklahoma. At Lake Eufaula, Oklahoma, damage was reported to the Eufaula Cove Marina and Jellystone Park, with houses, docks, and swimming pools sustaining damage. Additionally, trees and fences throughout the parks were knocked down, and the tin roofing on buildings was torn away. In Pontotoc County, Oklahoma, several power pole-related incidents were reported, including one power pole that started a fire in Byng after being downed by the severe weather. In between Woodward and Mooreland, Oklahoma, a BNSF train was derailed by the derecho, with around 16,000 feet (3.0 mi; 4.9 km; 4,900 m) of cargo, consisting of 160 shipping containers, being blown off the tracks. The majority of the containers were empty, despite some being labeled as containing hazardous chemicals. Multiple cranes and crews, including hazmat teams, were sent out to clean up the scene.

In Union City, Oklahoma, the Union City Post Office was temporarily closed after sustaining roof damage inflicted by the derecho, and the Word of Life Church in Dibble, Oklahoma, also had its roof damaged. Lawton High School in Lawton, Oklahoma, suffered damage to portions of its roof, along with water damage inside the building.

Following the derecho, Oklahoma Governor Kevin Stitt amended an emergency declaration, adding the counties of Beaver, Canadian, Grady, Hughes, McIntosh, and Oklahoma to the state of emergency in order to make resources available to those affected by the severe weather, along with assisting in repairing damages.

=== Flash flooding ===
Flash flooding affected large portions of the country in relation to the tornado outbreak and derecho. The Jasper County, Illinois fair was delayed after the fairgrounds experienced significant flooding on June 21, with a horse and cattle barn being flooded. In Beckley, West Virginia, a daily record of 2.68 in (68 mm) of rain was recorded on June 22, contributing to a wetter then average month and drought relief. In Delaware County, Pennsylvania, many roadways were flooded, including Route 291 which was blocked off due to flooding, downed tree limbs, and at least one live wire. Across southern portions of the county, rainfall amounts of 2–3 inches (51–76 mm) were reported, helping to alleviate a drought. Additionally, there was a weather delay for the France-Iraq World Cup game, the first weather delay in World Cup history, which lasted over two hours due to thunderstorms in Philadelphia. Portions of northeastern Arkansas and the Memphis metropolitan area saw significant flooding impacts, with Poinsett County, Arkansas, seeing 5–8 inches (130–200 mm) of rainfall within a few hours. Across the Memphis metropolitan area, widespread rainfall of 3–5 inches (76–127 mm) was reported. Several major roadways were flooded, including the southbound I-240 underpass, the eastbound I-40 ramp, areas along AR 1, and the AR 69/AR 163 intersection. Many neighborhood roads in northeastern Arkansas were flooded as well. The first floor of several apartments were flooded in Lexington, Kentucky, with five people being rescued. Additionally, multiple roads in the city were flooded and several areas at University of Kentucky were left underwater. Near Blackwell, Oklahoma, multiple roads were closed due to flooding from the Chikaskia River. A driver drove around one of the barricades, leading to a water rescue.

=== Other impacts ===
On June 22, a hailstorm passed through Fountain, Colorado, damaging numerous vehicles and tearing up gardens throughout several neighborhoods. The same day, two rounds of thunderstorms passed through southeastern Tennessee, with the first round being storms that produced only isolated wind damage, and the second round being a strong bowing cluster of storms that caused widespread and severe wind damage, mostly in Hamilton County near and in Chattanooga. Around 260 power poles, wires, and other electricity-related infrastructure were reported to be damaged, and around 4,500 customers lost electricity. Several roads were closed due to downed trees and power lines, with some large trees falling onto homes, causing structural damage and displacing families. Instances of fires and flooding were also reported, and the storms inflicted around $2.4 million (2026 USD) in damage.

In northern Alabama, over 7,000 people lost power after strong storms traversed the area. In Madison County, damage to trees and power lines was reported, with thousands of customers losing power. Sparse power outages were reported in Limestone County, and several hundred customers lost electricity in Jackson County, with multiple trees being downed across the Stevenson, Hollywood, and Douglas areas. Severe storms also tracked across Virginia, causing 47,733 Dominion Energy customers across the state to lose power, with 7,893 of those being in the city of Alexandria. That night, more storms tracked across central Alabama, with three main roads being blocked by downed power lines and other debris near Montgomery. In Delaware and Maryland, hundreds of customers lost electricity, with 682 being near Federalsburg, Maryland and 254 being near Laurel, Maryland.

In Delaware County, Pennsylvania, storms on June 22 inflicted widespread damage, with tree limbs being snapped off and falling onto homes and roads and around 1,000 customers losing electricity. Damaging storms also tracked through Philadelphia that night, uprooting trees and damaging several homes, including two rowhomes in West Oak Lane that were partially collapsed. The Red Cross assisted 13 people who were affected by the storms.

A strong microburst on June 22 tracked through Burke, Virginia, inflicting significant damage across a path that was 1 mile (1.6 km) long and 500 yards (460 m) wide. Numerous trees were snapped, uprooted, or had large branches broken off, with cars being crushed by the trees and power lines being downed. Within the path, multiple roads were blocked by the fallen trees, a business had its roof temporarily lifted into the air, several townhomes had their roofs partially torn away, and fencing was flattened. World Central Kitchen stated that it planned to send volunteers to Burke to provide affected individuals with meals.

== Aftermath ==
State	Deaths	Injuries
Kansas	1	1
Illinois	2	5
Indiana	0	2
Total	3	8

As a result of the outbreak, three people were killed, with one fatality occurring in Kansas and two others occurring in Illinois. An additional eight people were injured, including five in Illinois, two in Indiana, and one in Kansas.

Following the EF3 tornado in Jefferson County, Illinois, many volunteers, relief organizations, and members of the community assisted with the cleanup of destroyed homes, and aided in finding lost belongings. A total of three homes were completely destroyed, with several others being damaged. At least three roads were closed due to downed trees, and various power lines were also knocked down. The Kinmundy-Alma Fire Department was ordered to assist in cleaning up affected areas, and the region experienced large amounts of traffic due to the amount of people assisting, leading to officers asking anyone who's not contributing to recovery efforts to leave the area. A local business, Winsupply, began accepting donations such as blankets, water bottles, and other necessities, with the items being distributed to storm victims at Zion United Methodist Church. Illinois Baptist Disaster Relief deployed around 20 volunteers to assist, and Rocco's Pizza donated pizza to those affected. Additionally, deputies were ordered to patrol the impaced properties to prevent looting. Illinois Governor JB Pritzker issued a state disaster proclamation for 11 Illinois counties and toured the tornado damage in Jefferson County, pledging state support towards recovery.

On August 4, the Small Business Administration (SBA) approved a disaster declaration for Jefferson County, allowing people affected by the severe weather to apply for low-interest disaster loans to assist with recovery. Affected homeowners were allowed to apply for up to $500,000 in a low-interest disaster loan to repair or replace their residence, and could also apply for up to $100,000 to repair or replace personal property. Businesses and non-profit organizations were allowed to borrow up to $2 million to repair physical damages. Additionally, some individuals may have been eligible for a loan increase of 20% in order to make risk-reducing improvements, including strengthening structures and installing a storm shelter.

In Gibson County, Indiana, approximately 30 homes sustained damage, and the 90-year-old Blythe Chapel in Owensville, Indiana was destroyed. Multiple sirens near Owensville and Princeton in Gibson County did not operate when activated and are planned to be replaced. An EF1 tornado and associated severe weather between Shelburn and Hymera in Sullivan County, Indiana, downed numerous trees and damaged multiple trailers, with community members quickly starting cleanup efforts.

Various residences and businesses along State Road 66 sustained damage in Newburgh, Indiana, following an EF1 tornado. The Apple Center strip mall sustained severe damage, with portions of the roof being torn off, debris being scattered within the stores, and air conditioner units and furniture being displaced and blown away. Around 13 traffic signals had to be replaced, and at a retirement community, the front wall of a unit partially collapsed inward after being struck by flying debris, injuring one person. In another apartment complex, nearly every building sustained damage. Some roofs were ripped away, the windshields of vehicles were damaged, and sheet metal was scattered across the complex. Approximately 90 residents were evacuated, and shelter was set up at the Phoenix Event Center for displaced individuals. The Red Cross arrived to further assist people with finding shelter, and handed out cleaning supplies, such as rakes, gloves, and trash bags, to those affected by the severe weather. On August 20, individuals in Warrick County, Indiana, who were affected by the severe weather became allowed to apply for state disaster aid.

After the derecho on June 22, approximately 83,021 customers in Oklahoma were left without electricity, with around 10,000 of those being in Oklahoma County alone. The following day, Oklahoma Gas & Electric crews began to restore power and assess the damage, with around 1,400 employees, including 500 power line workers, vegetation removal crews, and damage assessors, being deployed across the state. By June 23, an estimated 76% of the affected customers had electricity restored. The Red Cross assisted individuals displaced by the severe weather, including multiple families in Tuttle.

== See also ==
- Weather of 2026
- List of derecho events
- List of F3, EF3, and IF3 tornadoes (2020–present)
- List of North American tornadoes and tornado outbreaks
- List of United States tornadoes from May to June 2026
- Tornado outbreak and derecho of June 9–11, 2026 – A tornado outbreak that occurred less than 2 weeks prior in similar areas
