= Kalamazoo (disambiguation) =

Kalamazoo is a city in Michigan, United States.

Kalamazoo may also refer to:

== Other places ==
- Kalamazoo, Florida, U.S.
- Kalamazoo, Nebraska, U.S.
- Kalamazoo, West Virginia, U.S.
- Kalamazoo County, Michigan, U.S.
- Kalamazoo–Portage metropolitan area, Michigan, U.S.
- Kalamazoo River, in Michigan, U.S.

== Arts and entertainment ==
=== Film ===
- Kalamazoo (film), a 1988 Canadian fantasy drama film
- Kalamazoo?, a 2006 American comedy film

=== Music ===
- "(I've Got a Gal In) Kalamazoo", a 1942 song by Glenn Miller and His Orchestra
- "Kalamazoo", the 13th song from Primus' 1997 Brown Album
- "Kalamazoo", a song by Ben Folds from the 2004 EP Super D
- "Kalamazoo" by Luna from the 1995 album Penthouse

== Businesses and brands ==
- Gibson Kalamazoo, two different lines of instruments produced by Gibson
- Kalamazoo Manufacturing Company, manufacturer of railroad equipment from 1883 to the 1990s
  - Kalamazoo, a railroad handcar powered by its passengers
- Kalamazoo Loose Leaf Binder Company, taken over by Remington Rand in 1927
- Kalamazoo, supplier of business stationery 1913–1980s, and later Kalamazoo IT, in Northfield, Birmingham, England

== Other uses ==
- Kalamazoo College, in Kalamazoo, Michigan, U.S.
- USS Kalamazoo, the name of several ships

== See also ==
- Etymology of Kalamazoo
- Kazoo, a simple musical instrument
