= Kirt =

Kirt or KIRT may refer to:

- K’irt’ or Kard, town in Armenia
- Kirt, West Virginia, United States
- KIRT, an American radio station

== People with the name ==
- Kirt Manwaring (born 1965), American baseball player
- Kirt Niedrigh, comic book character
- Kirt Ojala (born 1968), American baseball player
- Kirt Thompson (born 1967), Trinidad and Tobago javelin thrower
- Magnus Kirt (born 1990), Estonian athlete

== See also ==
- Kurt (disambiguation)
