= Adma =

Adma and ADMA may refer to:

== Places ==
=== Lebanon ===
- Adma wa Dafneh, a town on Mount Lebanon

=== United States ===
- Adma, West Virginia, an unincorporated community in Barbour County

== Other uses ==
- Adma (motorcycle)
- Asymmetric dimethylarginine (ADMA)
- Association for Data-driven Marketing and Advertising (ADMA), which absorbed Australian Interactive Media Industry Association (AIMIA)
