= Meadowville =

Meadowville may refer to:

- Meadowville, Nova Scotia, a community in Pictou County
- Meadowville, West Virginia, an unincorporated community in Barbour County
