= Meriden =

Meriden may refer to:

== Places ==
=== United Kingdom ===
- Meriden, Hertfordshire, England, a suburb of Watford; see List of United Kingdom locations
- Meriden, West Midlands, England
- Meriden (UK Parliament constituency), in the West Midlands

=== United States ===
- Meriden, Connecticut
  - Meriden station, railway facility
  - Meriden Markham Municipal Airport
- Meriden, Illinois
- Meriden, Iowa
- Meriden, Kansas
- Meriden, New Hampshire
- Meriden, West Virginia
- Meriden, Wyoming
- Meriden Township, Steele County, Minnesota

== Other ==
- Meriden (tribe), a subgroup of the Quinnipiac
- Meriden School, an Anglican school for girls in Strathfield, New South Wales, Australia

== See also ==
- Meriden Gap, in the West Midlands of England
