= Independence, West Virginia =

Independence is the name of several unincorporated communities in the U.S. state of West Virginia.

- Independence, Barbour County, West Virginia
- Independence, Clay County, West Virginia
- Independence, Jackson County, West Virginia
- Independence, Preston County, West Virginia
