= Dartmoor (disambiguation) =

Dartmoor may refer to:

== Places ==
- Dartmoor, Victoria, a rural township in southern Australia
- Dartmoor, an area of moorland in England
- Dartmoor (HM Prison), a men's prison in England
- Dartmoor, New Zealand, a rural locality in New Zealand
- Dartmoor, West Virginia, an unincorporated community in the United States

== Other ==
- "Dartmoor" (Walking Britain's Lost Railways), a TV documentary episode
- Dartmoor Pony, a horse breed
