= Dantown, West Virginia =

Unincorporated community in West Virginia, United States

Dantown
- Unincorporated community
- Location within the state of West Virginia Dantown (the United States)
- Coordinates: 39°9′21″N 79°58′0″W
- Country: United States
- State: West Virginia
- County: Barbour
- Elevation: 1,588 ft (484 m)
- Time zone: UTC-5 (Eastern (EST))
  - Summer (DST): UTC-4 (EDT)
- GNIS ID: 1697045

Dantown was an unincorporated community in Barbour County, West Virginia, United States.
