= Tacy =

Tacy may refer to:

- Tacy, West Virginia, an unincorporated community in Barbour County
- Carl Tacy (1932–2020), American college basketball coach
- Tacy Atkinson (1870–1937), American Christian missionary
- Tacy Macalos (born 1965), Filipino boxer
- Tacy Kelly, a fictional character in the Betsy-Tacy novels by Maud Hart Lovelace
