= Galloway, West Virginia =

Galloway
- Census-designated place (CDP)
- Location within the state of West Virginia
- Coordinates: 39°13′54″N 80°7′45″W
- Country: United States
- State: West Virginia
- County: Barbour

Area
  - Total: 0.627 sq mi (1.62 km^{2})
  - Land: 0.627 sq mi (1.62 km^{2})
  - Water: 0 sq mi (0 km^{2})
- Elevation: 1,234 ft (376 m)

Population (2020)
  - Total: 127
  - Density: 203/sq mi (78.2/km^{2})
- Time zone: UTC-5 (Eastern (EST))
  - Summer (DST): UTC-4 (EDT)
- ZIP codes: 26349
- GNIS feature ID: 2586808

Galloway is a census-designated place (CDP) and coal town in northwestern Barbour County, West Virginia, United States. It lies along West Virginia Route 76 northwest of the city of Philippi, the county seat of Barbour County. Its elevation is 1,073 feet (327 m). It has a post office with the ZIP code 26349. As of the 2020 census, Galloway had a population of 127.

The community was named after W. T. Galloway, a railroad official.
