= Overfield =

Overfield may refer to:

- Overfield Township, Pennsylvania
- Overfield, West Virginia

== People with the name Overfield ==
- Al Overfield
- Jackie Overfield
- Pete Overfield

== See also ==
- Field extension
