= Needmore, West Virginia (disambiguation) =

Needmore is the name of several places in the U.S. state of West Virginia.

- Needmore, a community in Hardy County
- Adaland, a community formerly known as Needmore, in Barbour County
