= Corley, West Virginia =

Corley may refer to the following communities in West Virginia:

- Corley, Barbour County, West Virginia
- Corley, Braxton County, West Virginia
