= Berryburg, West Virginia =

Unincorporated community in West Virginia, United States

Berryburg
- Unincorporated community
- Location within the state of West Virginia Berryburg (the United States)
- Coordinates: 39°12′0″N 80°5′4″W
- Country: United States
- State: West Virginia
- County: Barbour
- Elevation: 1,352 ft (412 m)
- Time zone: UTC-5 (Eastern (EST))
  - Summer (DST): UTC-4 (EDT)
- GNIS feature ID: 1535672

Berryburg is an unincorporated community in Barbour County in the U.S. state of West Virginia. Berryburg lies to the northwest of Philippi on West Virginia Route 76.

The Adaland in Berryburg is a historic house museum listed on the National Register of Historic Places.

It is the birthplace of James H. McGee, the first black mayor of Dayton, Ohio.
