= Wilmoth, West Virginia =

Wilmoth
- Unincorporated community
- Location within the state of West Virginia Wilmoth (the United States)
- Coordinates: 39°2′7″N 79°58′59″W
- Country: United States
- State: West Virginia
- County: Barbour
- Elevation: 1,670 ft (510 m)
- Time zone: UTC-5 (Eastern (EST))
  - Summer (DST): UTC-4 (EDT)
- GNIS ID: 1697206

Wilmoth was an unincorporated community in Barbour County, West Virginia, United States.

The community most likely was named after the local Wilmoth family.
