= Valley Bend, West Virginia =

Valley Bend, West Virginia may refer to:

- Valley Bend, Barbour County, West Virginia, an unincorporated community in Barbour County
- Valley Bend, Randolph County, West Virginia, a census-designated place in Randolph County
