= Stringtown, Barbour County, West Virginia =

Stringtown
- Unincorporated community
- Location within the state of West Virginia Stringtown (the United States)
- Coordinates: 39°1′43″N 79°54′31″W
- Country: United States
- State: West Virginia
- County: Barbour
- Elevation: 1,732 ft (528 m)
- Time zone: UTC-5 (Eastern (EST))
  - Summer (DST): UTC-4 (EDT)
- GNIS feature ID: 1547588

Stringtown is a small, unincorporated community located along the Stringtown Road near Belington in Barbour County, West Virginia, United States. It traces its route from east to west beginning on West Virginia Route 92, until it intersects with Cross Road, which exits back onto WV 92, then turns south until it intersects with Laurel Mountain Road. On the way, it also intersects with Hunters Fork Road, which travels north and also empties back onto WV 92.
