= Peeltree, West Virginia =

Peeltree
- Unincorporated community
- Location within the state of West Virginia Peeltree (the United States)
- Coordinates: 39°7′46″N 80°12′38″W
- Country: United States
- State: West Virginia
- County: Barbour
- Elevation: 1,079 ft (329 m)
- Time zone: UTC-5 (Eastern (EST))
  - Summer (DST): UTC-4 (EDT)
- GNIS ID: 1544690

Peeltree — formerly Scoop Town, then Peel Tree — is an unincorporated community in Barbour County, West Virginia, United States.

The community takes its name from the nearby Peeltree Run.
