= Junior, West Virginia =

- Town
- Location of Junior in Barbour County, West Virginia.

- Location within the state of West Virginia
- Coordinates: 38°58′39″N 79°57′1″W
- Country: United States
- State: West Virginia
- County: Barbour

Area
  - Total: 0.34 sq mi (0.88 km^{2})
  - Land: 0.31 sq mi (0.81 km^{2})
  - Water: 0.023 sq mi (0.06 km^{2})
- Elevation: 1,745 ft (532 m)

Population (2020)
  - Total: 384
  - Estimate (2021): 384
  - Density: 1,549.2/sq mi (598.16/km^{2})
- Time zone: UTC-5 (Eastern (EST))
  - Summer (DST): UTC-4 (EDT)
- ZIP code: 26275
- Area code: 304 681
- FIPS code: 54-42244
- GNIS feature ID: 1554837
- Website: https://www.townofjunior.com/

Junior is a town in Barbour County, West Virginia, United States, situated along the Tygart Valley River. The population was 384 at the 2020 census.

== Geography ==
Junior is located at 38°58′39″N 79°57′1″W (38.977379, -79.950300).

According to the United States Census Bureau, the town has a total area of 0.33 square miles (0.85 km^{2}), of which 0.31 square miles (0.80 km^{2}) is land and 0.02 square miles (0.05 km^{2}) is water.

== Demographics ==
Historical population
Census	Pop.	Note	%±
1900	335		—
1910	435		29.9%
1920	593		36.3%
1930	560		−5.6%
1940	533		−4.8%
1950	729		36.8%
1960	552		−24.3%
1970	513		−7.1%
1980	591		15.2%
1990	542		−8.3%
2000	450		−17.0%
2010	520		15.6%
2020	384		−26.2%
2021 (est.)	384	Steady	0.0%
U.S. Decennial Census

=== 2010 census ===
At the 2010 census there were 520 people, 197 households, and 147 families living in the town. The population density was 1,677.4 inhabitants per square mile (647.6/km^{2}). There were 233 housing units at an average density of 751.6 per square mile (290.2/km^{2}). The racial makeup of the town was 99.2% White, 0.4% African American, 0.2% from other races, and 0.2% from two or more races. Hispanic or Latino of any race were 0.6%.

Of the 197 households 44.7% had children under the age of 18 living with them, 50.8% were married couples living together, 14.7% had a female householder with no husband present, 9.1% had a male householder with no wife present, and 25.4% were non-families. 21.3% of households were one person and 11.6% were one person aged 65 or older. The average household size was 2.64 and the average family size was 3.03.

The median age in the town was 34.8 years. 27.9% of residents were under the age of 18; 8.5% were between the ages of 18 and 24; 26.5% were from 25 to 44; 24.5% were from 45 to 64; and 12.5% were 65 or older. The gender makeup of the town was 49.6% male and 50.4% female.

=== 2000 census ===
At the 2000 census there were 450 people, 178 households, and 134 families living in the town. The population density was 1,510.8 inhabitants per square mile (579.2/km^{2}). There were 202 housing units at an average density of 678.2 per square mile (260.0/km^{2}). The racial makeup of the town was 98.89% White, and 1.11% from two or more races. Hispanic or Latino of any race were 0.44%.

Of the 178 households 35.4% had children under the age of 18 living with them, 55.1% were married couples living together, 15.2% had a female householder with no husband present, and 24.7% were non-families. 22.5% of households were one person and 10.7% were one person aged 65 or older. The average household size was 2.53 and the average family size was 2.96.

The age distribution was 26.0% under the age of 18, 8.2% from 18 to 24, 27.1% from 25 to 44, 25.1% from 45 to 64, and 13.6% 65 or older. The median age was 36 years. For every 100 females, there were 99.1 males. For every 100 females age 18 and over, there were 97.0 males.

The median household income was $20,536 and the median family income was $26,250. Males had a median income of $21,875 versus $15,875 for females. The per capita income for the town was $10,279. About 20.3% of families and 24.5% of the population were below the poverty line, including 39.8% of those under age 18 and 20.0% of those age 65 or over.

== History ==
The community of Junior was established on November 13, 1897. It was named after the son of Henry Gassaway Davis, Sr, (1823–1916) a U.S. Senator and coal magnate. Henry ("Harry") Gassaway Davis Jr (1871–1896) had been drowned at sea off the Atlantic Coast of South Africa while returning home on the steamship Munkesenton.
