= Union, Barbour County, West Virginia =

Union
- Unincorporated community
- Location within the state of West Virginia Union (the United States)
- Coordinates: 39°6′0″N 80°2′17″W
- Country: United States
- State: West Virginia
- County: Barbour
- Elevation: 1,854 ft (565 m)
- Time zone: UTC-5 (Eastern (EST))
  - Summer (DST): UTC-4 (EDT)
- GNIS ID: 1697193

Union is an unincorporated community in Barbour County, West Virginia, United States.
