= Talbott, West Virginia =

Talbott
- Unincorporated community
- Location within the state of West Virginia Talbott (the United States)
- Coordinates: 38°58.465′N 80°0.913′W
- Country: United States
- State: West Virginia
- County: Barbour
- Elevation: 2,264 ft (690 m)
- Time zone: UTC-5 (Eastern (EST))
  - Summer (DST): UTC-4 (EDT)
- GNIS feature ID: 1549951

Talbott is an unincorporated community in Barbour County, West Virginia, United States.

Talbott was settled in 1844.
