= Longview, West Virginia =

Longview
- Unincorporated community
- Location within the state of West Virginia Longview (the United States)
- Coordinates: 39°5′2″N 80°8′20″W
- Country: United States
- State: West Virginia
- County: Barbour
- Elevation: 1,417 ft (432 m)
- Time zone: UTC-5 (Eastern (EST))
  - Summer (DST): UTC-4 (EDT)
- GNIS ID: 1554993

Longview is an unincorporated community in Barbour County, West Virginia, United States.
