= Bear Mountain, West Virginia =

Unincorporated community in West Virginia, United States

- Unincorporated community
- Location within West Virginia Location within the United States
- Coordinates: 39°13′02″N 80°10′00″W
- Country: United States
- State: West Virginia
- County: Barbour
- Elevation: 1,181 ft (360 m)
- Time zone: UTC-5 (Eastern (EST))
  - Summer (DST): UTC-4 (EDT)
- Area codes: 304 & 681
- GNIS feature ID: 1535379

Bear Mountain is an unincorporated community in Barbour County, West Virginia, United States. Bear Mountain is located along County Route 16, 3.9 miles (6.3 km) south-southwest of Flemington.
