= Jones, West Virginia =

Jones
- Unincorporated community
- Location within the state of West Virginia Jones (the United States)
- Coordinates: 39°3′30″N 79°59′27″W
- Country: United States
- State: West Virginia
- County: Barbour
- Elevation: 2,083 ft (635 m)
- Time zone: UTC-5 (Eastern (EST))
  - Summer (DST): UTC-4 (EDT)
- GNIS ID: 1554828

Jones is an unincorporated community in Barbour County, West Virginia, United States.
