= Corley, Barbour County, West Virginia =

Unincorporated community in West Virginia, United States

Corley, West Virginia
- Unincorporated community
- Location within West Virginia Location within the United States
- Coordinates: 39°04′51″N 79°59′13″W
- Country: United States
- State: West Virginia
- County: Barbour
- Elevation: 1,814 ft (553 m)
- Time zone: UTC-5 (Eastern (EST))
  - Summer (DST): UTC-4 (EDT)
- Area codes: 304 & 681
- GNIS feature ID: 1554192

Corley is an unincorporated community in Barbour County, West Virginia, United States. Corley is located on U.S. Route 250, 4.7 miles (7.6 km) northwest of Belington.
