= Mount Liberty, West Virginia =

Mount Liberty
- Unincorporated community
- Location within the state of West Virginia Mount Liberty (the United States)
- Coordinates: 39°4′45″N 80°1′18″W
- Country: United States
- State: West Virginia
- County: Barbour
- Elevation: 2,005 ft (611 m)
- Time zone: UTC-5 (Eastern (EST))
  - Summer (DST): UTC-4 (EDT)
- GNIS ID: 1555170

Mount Liberty is an unincorporated community in Barbour County, West Virginia, United States.
