= Volga, West Virginia =

- Unincorporated community
- Location within West Virginia Location within the United States
- Coordinates: 39°04′42″N 80°08′07″W
- Country: United States
- State: West Virginia
- County: Barbour
- Elevation: 1,431 ft (436 m)
- Time zone: UTC-5 (Eastern (EST))
  - Summer (DST): UTC-4 (EDT)
- ZIP code: 26238
- Area codes: 304 & 681
- GNIS feature ID: 1548688

Volga is an unincorporated community in Barbour County, West Virginia, United States. Volga is 7.5 miles (12.1 km) southwest of Philippi. Volga has a post office with ZIP code 26238.

An early variant name was Burnersville; the name Volga is a transfer from the Volga River in Europe.
