= Century Junction, West Virginia =

Unincorporated community in West Virginia, United States

Century Junction
- Unincorporated community
- Location within the state of West Virginia Century Junction (the United States)
- Coordinates: 39°4′27″N 80°7′1″W
- Country: United States
- State: West Virginia
- County: Barbour
- Elevation: 1,388 ft (423 m)
- Time zone: UTC-5 (Eastern (EST))
  - Summer (DST): UTC-4 (EDT)
- GNIS ID: 1554103

Century Junction is an unincorporated community in Barbour County, West Virginia, United States.
