= Lantz, West Virginia =

Lantz
- Unincorporated community
- Location within the state of West Virginia Lantz (the United States)
- Coordinates: 38°56′58″N 80°4′54″W
- Country: United States
- State: West Virginia
- County: Barbour
- Elevation: 1,890 ft (580 m)
- Time zone: UTC-5 (Eastern (EST))
  - Summer (DST): UTC-4 (EDT)
- GNIS ID: 1697095

Lantz is an unincorporated community in Barbour County, West Virginia, United States.

The community was named after George W. Lantz, who was instrumental in securing a post office for the town.
