= Bernard E. Wilmoth House =

Historic house in West Virginia, United States

- U.S. National Register of Historic Places
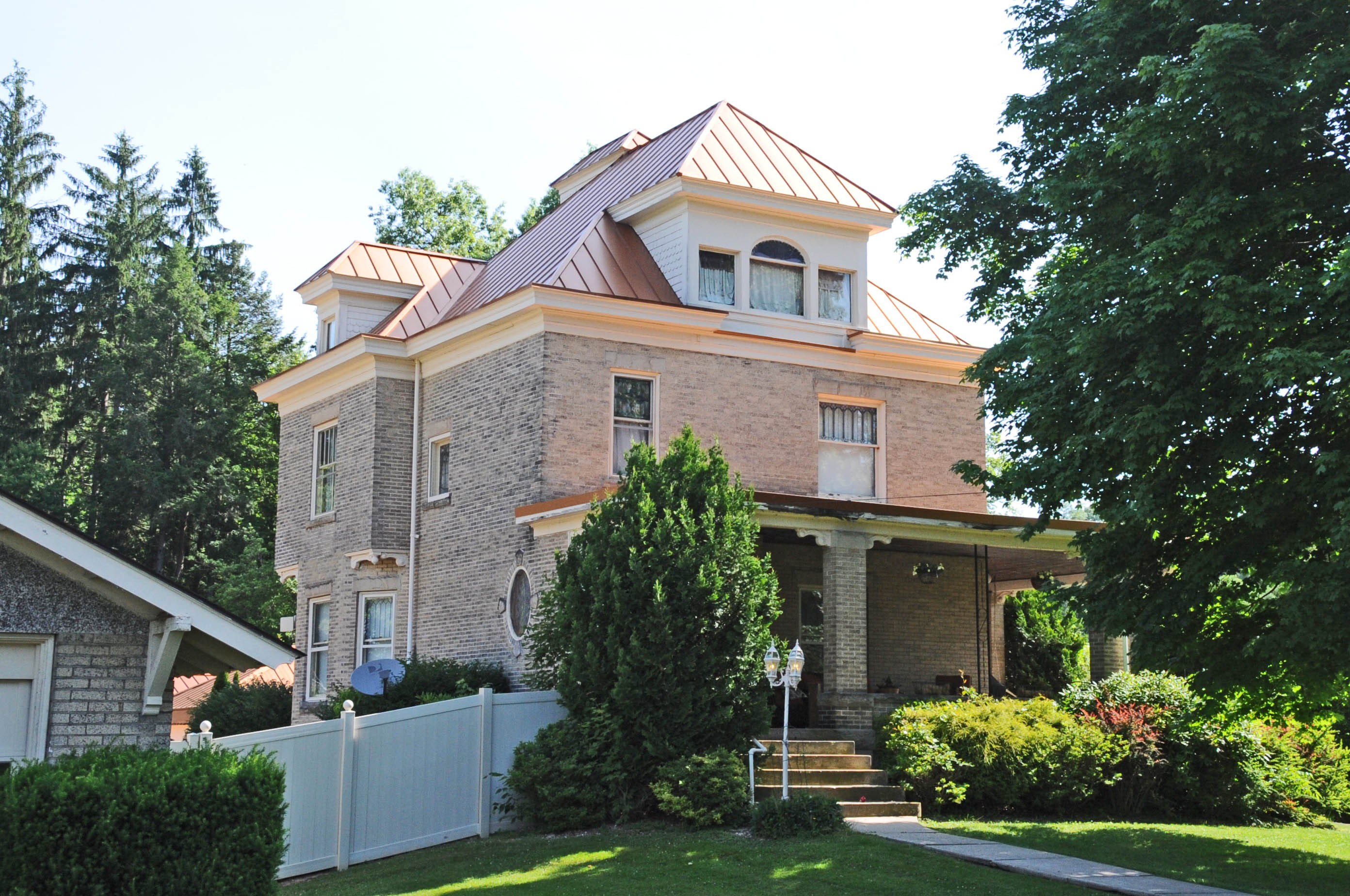

- Location within West Virginia Location within the United States
- Location: 303 Dayton Blvd., Belington, West Virginia
- Coordinates: 39°1′45″N 79°56′19″W
- Area: less than one acre
- Built: 1913
- Architectural style: Queen Anne
- NRHP reference No.: 05001348
- Added to NRHP: November 30, 2005

Bernard E. Wilmoth House is a historic home in Belington, Barbour County, West Virginia, United States. It was built in 1911–13, and is a 2 1/2-story Queen Anne-style house. It is built of speckled tan-colored bricks. It features a variety of window styles and a large verandah on one and one half sides of the house.

It was listed on the National Register of Historic Places in 1984.
