= Cove Run, West Virginia =

Unincorporated community in West Virginia, United States

Cove Run
- Unincorporated community
- Location within the state of West Virginia Cove Run (the United States)
- Coordinates: 39°14′43″N 79°55′59″W
- Country: United States
- State: West Virginia
- County: Barbour
- Elevation: 1,257 ft (383 m)
- Time zone: UTC-5 (Eastern (EST))
  - Summer (DST): UTC-4 (EDT)
- GNIS ID: 1697039

Cove Run is an unincorporated community in Barbour County, West Virginia, United States.
