= Pepper, West Virginia =

- Unincorporated community
- Location within West Virginia Location within the United States
- Coordinates: 39°11′19″N 80°09′23″W
- Country: United States
- State: West Virginia
- County: Barbour
- Elevation: 1,145 ft (349 m)
- Time zone: UTC-5 (Eastern (EST))
  - Summer (DST): UTC-4 (EDT)
- Area codes: 304 & 681
- GNIS feature ID: 1555326

Pepper is an unincorporated community in Barbour County, West Virginia, United States. Pepper is 6.5 miles (10.5 km) west-northwest of Philippi.
