= Clemtown, West Virginia =

Unincorporated community in West Virginia, United States

Clemtown
- Unincorporated community
- Location within the state of West Virginia Clemtown (the United States)
- Coordinates: 39°13′57″N 79°58′38″W
- Country: United States
- State: West Virginia
- County: Barbour
- Elevation: 1,814 ft (553 m)
- Time zone: UTC-5 (Eastern (EST))
  - Summer (DST): UTC-4 (EDT)
- GNIS ID: 1554146

Clemtown is an unincorporated community in Barbour County, West Virginia, United States.
