= West Junior, West Virginia =

West Junior
- Unincorporated community
- Location within the state of West Virginia West Junior (the United States)
- Coordinates: 38°58′48″N 79°57′5″W
- Country: United States
- State: West Virginia
- County: Barbour
- Elevation: 1,745 ft (532 m)
- Time zone: UTC-5 (Eastern (EST))
  - Summer (DST): UTC-4 (EDT)
- GNIS ID: 1697204

West Junior is an unincorporated community in Barbour County, West Virginia, United States.
