= Middle Fork, West Virginia =

Middle Fork
- Unincorporated community
- Location within the state of West Virginia Middle Fork (the United States)
- Coordinates: 39°3′43″N 80°2′48″W
- Country: United States
- State: West Virginia
- County: Barbour
- Elevation: 1,519 ft (463 m)
- Time zone: UTC-5 (Eastern (EST))
  - Summer (DST): UTC-4 (EDT)
- GNIS ID: 1555111

Middle Fork is an unincorporated community in Barbour County, West Virginia, United States.
