= Century, West Virginia =

Century
- Census-designated place
- Location within West Virginia
- Coordinates: 39°05′59″N 80°11′19″W
- Country: United States
- State: West Virginia
- County: Barbour

Area
  - Total: 0.131 sq mi (0.34 km^{2})
  - Land: 0.131 sq mi (0.34 km^{2})
  - Water: 0 sq mi (0 km^{2})
- Elevation: 1,532 ft (467 m)

Population (2020)
  - Total: 111
  - Density: 847/sq mi (327/km^{2})
- Time zone: UTC-5 (Eastern (EST))
  - Summer (DST): UTC-4 (EDT)
- Area codes: 304 & 681
- GNIS feature ID: 1554102

Century is a census-designated place and coal town in Barbour County, West Virginia, United States. As of the 2020 census, Century had a population of 111.

The community's coal deposits were believed to be abundant enough to last a century, hence the name.
