= Claude, West Virginia =

Unincorporated community in West Virginia, United States

Claude
- Unincorporated community
- Location within the state of West Virginia Claude (the United States)
- Coordinates: 39°17′23″N 79°54′34″W
- Country: United States
- State: West Virginia
- County: Barbour
- Elevation: 1,306 ft (398 m)
- Time zone: UTC-5 (Eastern (EST))
  - Summer (DST): UTC-4 (EDT)
- GNIS ID: 1549629

Claude is an unincorporated community in Barbour County, West Virginia, United States.
