= Calhoun, West Virginia =

Unincorporated community in West Virginia, United States

Calhoun
- Unincorporated community
- Location within the state of West Virginia Calhoun (the United States)
- Coordinates: 39°5′28″N 79°59′8″W
- Country: United States
- State: West Virginia
- County: Barbour
- Elevation: 1,919 ft (585 m)
- Time zone: UTC-5 (Eastern (EST))
  - Summer (DST): UTC-4 (EDT)
- GNIS feature ID: 1536863

Calhoun is an unincorporated community in Barbour County in the U.S. state of West Virginia.
