= Werner, West Virginia =

Werner
- Unincorporated community
- Location within the state of West Virginia Werner (the United States)
- Coordinates: 39°1′4″N 80°0′37″W
- Country: United States
- State: West Virginia
- County: Barbour
- Elevation: 2,231 ft (680 m)
- Time zone: UTC-5 (Eastern (EST))
  - Summer (DST): UTC-4 (EDT)
- GNIS ID: 1549983

Werner is an unincorporated community in Barbour County, West Virginia, United States.
