= Gage, West Virginia =

Unincorporated community in West Virginia, United States

Gage
- Unincorporated community
- Location within the state of West Virginia Gage (the United States)
- Coordinates: 38°58′13″N 79°57′38″W
- Country: United States
- State: West Virginia
- County: Barbour
- Elevation: 1,742 ft (531 m)
- Time zone: UTC-5 (Eastern (EST))
  - Summer (DST): UTC-4 (EDT)
- GNIS ID: 1554521

Gage is an unincorporated community in Barbour County, West Virginia, United States.
