= Adaland =

Historic house in West Virginia, United States

- U.S. National Register of Historic Places
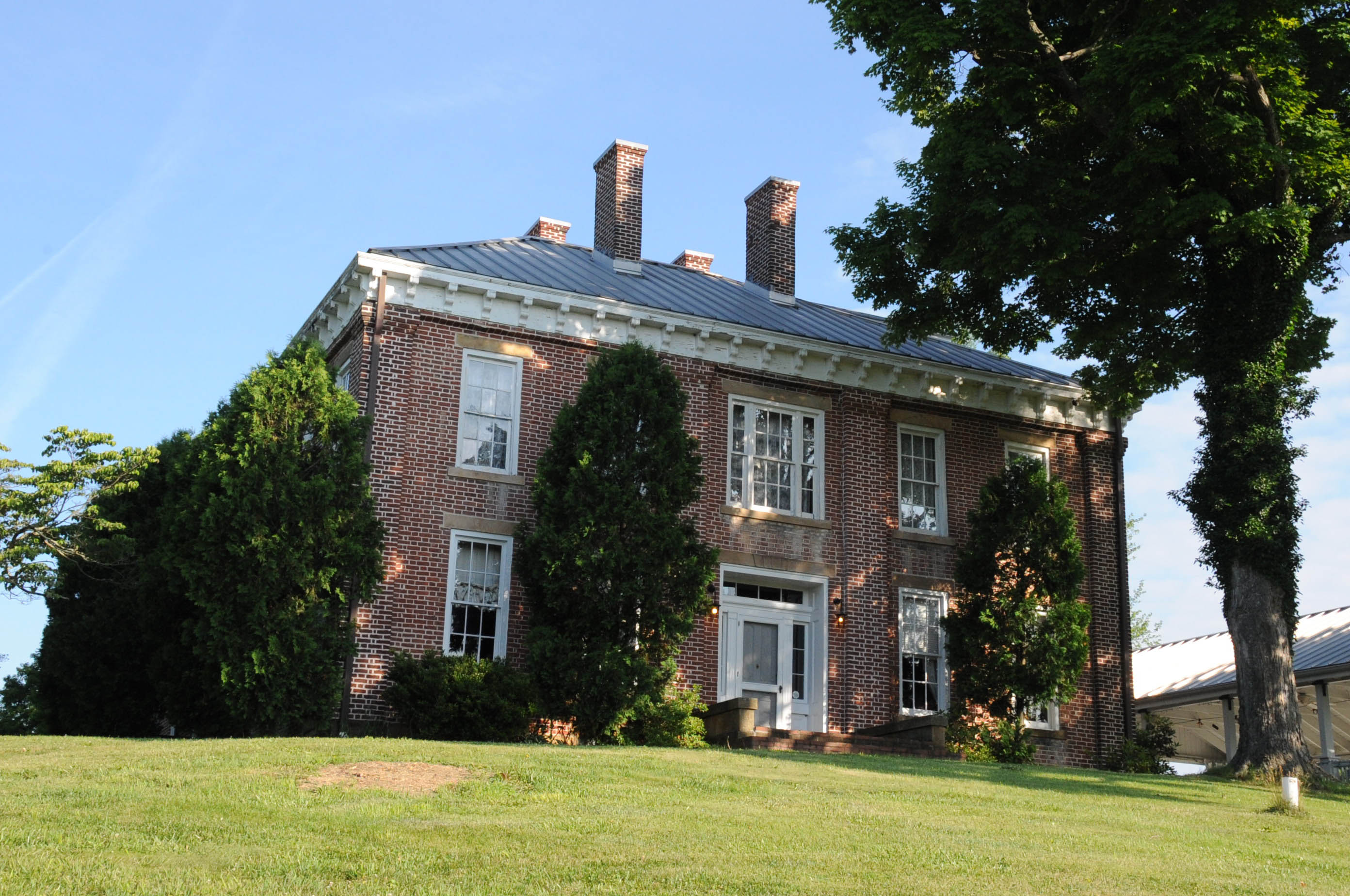

- Location within West Virginia Location within the United States
- Location: County Route 77/5 off WV 76 at Fox Grape Run, Berryburg, West Virginia
- Coordinates: 39°12′4″N 80°4′13″W
- Area: 17 acres (6.9 ha)
- Built: 1868; 158 years ago (house); 1850; 176 years ago (barn )
- Architect: James David Corder
- Architectural style: Greek Revival
- NRHP reference No.: 95000419
- Added to NRHP: April 14, 1995

Adaland (also known as the Modisett Mansion) is a historic house located at Berryburg, Barbour County, West Virginia.

== Description and history ==
It was built in 1868 and is a two-story, L-shaped, Greek Revival style brick house. It sits on a cut fieldstone foundation on top of a hill with an excellent view of the surrounding hills, farms, mines, and gardens. Also on the property are a contributing carriage house (1872) and 19th century barn. The property was purchased by West Virginia Supreme Court of Appeals Justice Ira E. Robinson in 1920. It is open as a historic house museum.

It was listed on the National Register of Historic Places in 1995. In 1996, the house and surrounding properties were donated to the City of Philippi, West Virginia by a nearby coal company. The house is now maintained by a private non-profit organization and is open for various types of tours, teas, weddings, luncheons, dinner theaters, and other occasions.
