= Brownton, West Virginia =

Unincorporated community in West Virginia, United States

- Unincorporated community
- Location within West Virginia Location within the United States
- Coordinates: 39°13′12″N 80°09′00″W
- Country: United States
- State: West Virginia
- County: Barbour
- Elevation: 1,109 ft (338 m)
- Time zone: UTC-5 (Eastern (EST))
  - Summer (DST): UTC-4 (EDT)
- Area codes: 304 & 681
- GNIS feature ID: 1553996

Brownton is an unincorporated community and coal town in Barbour County, West Virginia, United States. Brownton is located along County Route 16, 3.35 miles (5.39 km) south-southwest of Flemington. Brownton had a post office, which closed on January 24, 2004.
