= Wellington Heights, West Virginia =

Wellington Heights
- Unincorporated community
- Location within the state of West Virginia Wellington Heights (the United States)
- Coordinates: 39°8′30″N 80°4′1″W
- Country: United States
- State: West Virginia
- County: Barbour
- Elevation: 1,483 ft (452 m)
- Time zone: UTC-5 (Eastern (EST))
  - Summer (DST): UTC-4 (EDT)
- GNIS ID: 1555937

Wellington Heights is an unincorporated community in Barbour County, West Virginia, United States.
