= Valley Bend, Barbour County, West Virginia =

Valley Bend, West Virginia
- Unincorporated community
- Location within West Virginia Location within the United States
- Coordinates: 39°03′42″N 79°58′17″W
- Country: United States
- State: West Virginia
- County: Barbour
- Elevation: 1,965 ft (599 m)
- Time zone: UTC-5 (Eastern (EST))
  - Summer (DST): UTC-4 (EDT)
- Area codes: 304 & 681
- GNIS feature ID: 1548584

Valley Bend is an unincorporated community in Barbour County, West Virginia, United States. Valley Bend is located on U.S. Route 250, 3 miles (4.8 km) northwest of Belington.
