= Mansfield, West Virginia =

Mansfield
- Unincorporated community
- Location within the state of West Virginia Mansfield (the United States)
- Coordinates: 39°9′0″N 80°3′13″W
- Country: United States
- State: West Virginia
- County: Barbour
- Elevation: 1,414 ft (431 m)
- Time zone: UTC-5 (Eastern (EST))
  - Summer (DST): UTC-4 (EDT)
- GNIS ID: 1555039

Mansfield is an unincorporated community in Barbour County, West Virginia, United States.
