= Meadowville, West Virginia =

Meadowville
- Unincorporated community
- Location within the state of West Virginia Meadowville (the United States)
- Coordinates: 39°7′5″N 79°54′34″W
- Country: United States
- State: West Virginia
- County: Barbour
- Elevation: 1,572 ft (479 m)
- Time zone: UTC-5 (Eastern (EST))
  - Summer (DST): UTC-4 (EDT)
- GNIS ID: 1543096

Meadowville is an unincorporated community in Barbour County, West Virginia, United States.

== History ==
The first church in present-day Barbour County — indeed, in all of what was then Randolph County — was Bethel Chapel (a generation later identifying as a Primitive Baptist church) just west of Meadowville. It was established in 1795 by Elders Phineas Wells and Simeon Harris.
