= Overfield, West Virginia =

Overfield
- Unincorporated community
- Location within the state of West Virginia Overfield (the United States)
- Coordinates: 39°10′9″N 80°12′15″W
- Country: United States
- State: West Virginia
- County: Barbour
- Elevation: 1,060 ft (320 m)
- Time zone: UTC-5 (Eastern (EST))
  - Summer (DST): UTC-4 (EDT)
- GNIS ID: 1544481

Overfield is an unincorporated community in Barbour County, West Virginia, United States. There is a nearby church named Overfield Community Church.
