= USS Kalamazoo =

USS Kalamazoo may refer to the following ships of the United States Navy:

- USS Kalamazoo (1863), was a monitor laid down in 1863 and never completed. She was renamed Colossus on 15 June 1869 and broken up for scrap in 1884
- USS Kalamazoo (AOG-30), was a Mettawee-class gasoline tanker laid down 7 July 1944 and transferred to Colombia 26 November 1947
- USS Kalamazoo (AOR-6) was an oiler laid down in 1970 and decommissioned in 1996
