= Kirt, West Virginia =

Kirt
- Unincorporated community
- Location within the state of West Virginia Kirt (the United States)
- Coordinates: 39°6′58″N 79°52′27″W
- Country: United States
- State: West Virginia
- County: Barbour
- Elevation: 1,808 ft (551 m)
- Time zone: UTC-5 (Eastern (EST))
  - Summer (DST): UTC-4 (EDT)
- GNIS ID: 1551655

Kirt is an unincorporated community in Barbour County, West Virginia, United States.
