= Moatsville, West Virginia =

- Unincorporated community
- Location within West Virginia Location within the United States
- Coordinates: 39°12′37″N 79°55′59″W
- Country: United States
- State: West Virginia
- County: Barbour
- Elevation: 1,234 ft (376 m)
- Time zone: UTC-5 (Eastern (EST))
  - Summer (DST): UTC-4 (EDT)
- ZIP code: 26405
- Area codes: 304 & 681
- GNIS feature ID: 1543473

Moatsville is an unincorporated community in Barbour County, West Virginia, United States. Moatsville is 7 miles (11 km) northeast of Philippi. Moatsville has a post office with ZIP code 26405.

The community most likely was named after the local Moats family.

Moatsville runs along the Tygart River.
