= Kurt (disambiguation) =

Kurt is a German-language masculine given name.

Kurt may also refer to:

- Kurt (food), a Central Asian food
- Yujiulü Mugulü, former of the Rouran Khaganate, also known as Kurt.
- KURT, a radio station (93.7 FM) licensed to serve Prineville, Oregon, United States
- Kurt (surname), a Turkish (Kurt) or Hungarian (Kürt) surname
- KutMasta Kurt, American hip-hop producer
- Weather Station Kurt, Nazi WWII weather station in northern Labrador, Canada
- Moshulu, four-masted steel barque formerly named Kurt, docked in Penn's Landing, Philadelphia

== See also ==
- Curt
- Kurd (disambiguation)
