= Meriden, West Virginia =

Meriden
- Unincorporated community
- Location within the state of West Virginia Meriden (the United States)
- Coordinates: 39°9′51″N 80°1′25″W
- Country: United States
- State: West Virginia
- County: Barbour
- Elevation: 1,306 ft (398 m)
- Time zone: UTC-5 (Eastern (EST))
  - Summer (DST): UTC-4 (EDT)
- GNIS ID: 1549818

Meriden is an unincorporated community and coal town in Barbour County, West Virginia, United States.
