= Adma, West Virginia =

Unincorporated community in West Virginia, United States

Adma
- Unincorporated community
- Location within the state of West Virginia Adma (the United States)
- Coordinates: 39°4′33″N 80°2′16″W
- Country: United States
- State: West Virginia
- County: Barbour
- Elevation: 1,444 ft (440 m)
- Time zone: UTC-5 (Eastern (EST))
  - Summer (DST): UTC-4 (EDT)
- GNIS ID: 1696988

Adma was an unincorporated community in Barbour County, West Virginia, United States. Adma is located along the former Baltimore and Ohio Railroad and the Tygart Valley River.
