= Adma (motorcycle) =

German motorcycle manufactured 1924–1926

The Adma was a motorcycle manufactured in Germany between 1924 and 1926. The bikes were powered by 169cc two-stroke engine with an internal flywheel.

== Overview ==
Adma began its production at a time when hundreds of small factories in Germany began making motorcycles. This was their response to the need for light, inexpensive transportation that had arisen after World War I. Because of the large number of brands, they were forced to find customers in their own region, because a large dealer network could not be built up. Many of these brands purchased built-in engines from other brands, but Adma chose the much more expensive option of developing its own engine block. Like most of these small manufacturers, they had to cease production very soon.
