= Adaland, West Virginia =

Unincorporated community in West Virginia, United States

Adaland
- Unincorporated community
- Location within the state of West Virginia Adaland (the United States)
- Coordinates: 39°12′31″N 80°4′36″W
- Country: United States
- State: West Virginia
- County: Barbour
- Elevation: 1,398 ft (426 m)
- Time zone: UTC-5 (Eastern (EST))
  - Summer (DST): UTC-4 (EDT)
- GNIS ID: 1553692

Adaland is an unincorporated community in Barbour County, West Virginia, United States. Adaland is located along Adaland Road (West Virginia Secondary Route 77/6), and was formerly served by a spur of the Baltimore and Ohio Railroad. The community's post office was also known as Needmore.
