= Kalamazoo, West Virginia =

Kalamazoo
- Unincorporated community
- Location within the state of West Virginia Kalamazoo (the United States)
- Coordinates: 39°8′29″N 79°54′57″W
- Country: United States
- State: West Virginia
- County: Barbour
- Elevation: 1,618 ft (493 m)
- Time zone: UTC-5 (Eastern (EST))
  - Summer (DST): UTC-4 (EDT)
- GNIS feature ID: 1549767

Kalamazoo is an unincorporated community in Barbour County, West Virginia, United States. Its post office has been closed since 1897.
