= Kasson, West Virginia =

- Unincorporated community
- Location within West Virginia Location within the United States
- Coordinates: 39°13′29″N 79°52′31″W
- Country: United States
- State: West Virginia
- County: Barbour
- Elevation: 1,476 ft (450 m)
- Time zone: UTC-5 (Eastern (EST))
  - Summer (DST): UTC-4 (EDT)
- ZIP codes: 26380, 26405
- Area codes: 304 & 681
- GNIS feature ID: 1554845

Kasson is an unincorporated community in Barbour County, West Virginia, United States. It is 10 miles (16 km) northeast of Philippi.

The community derives its name from one Mr. Cassen, an early postmaster.
