= Tacy, West Virginia =

Tacy
- Unincorporated community
- Location within the state of West Virginia Tacy (the United States)
- Coordinates: 39°9′43″N 79°56′31″W
- Country: United States
- State: West Virginia
- County: Barbour
- Elevation: 1,696 ft (517 m)
- Time zone: UTC-5 (Eastern (EST))
  - Summer (DST): UTC-4 (EDT)
- GNIS ID: 1547869

Tacy is an unincorporated community in Barbour County, West Virginia, United States.
