= Independence, Barbour County, West Virginia =

Independence
- Unincorporated community
- Location within the state of West Virginia Independence (the United States)
- Coordinates: 39°7′25″N 80°2′29″W
- Country: United States
- State: West Virginia
- County: Barbour
- Elevation: 1,618 ft (493 m)
- Time zone: UTC-5 (Eastern (EST))
  - Summer (DST): UTC-4 (EDT)
- GNIS feature ID: 1697083

Independence is an unincorporated community in Barbour County, West Virginia, United States. Independence is located south of Philippi on County Route 30 near the Tygart Valley River. The community is centered on and named for the Independence School there.
