= West Virginia Route 76 =

State highway in West Virginia, United States

West Virginia Route 76

Route information
- Maintained by WVDOH
- Length: 16.0 mi (25.7 km)

Major junctions
- West end: US 50 in Bridgeport
- East end: US 119 / US 250 near Philippi

Location
- Country: United States
- State: West Virginia
- Counties: Harrison, Taylor, Barbour

Highway system
- West Virginia State Highway System; Interstate; US; State
← WV 75	→ I-77

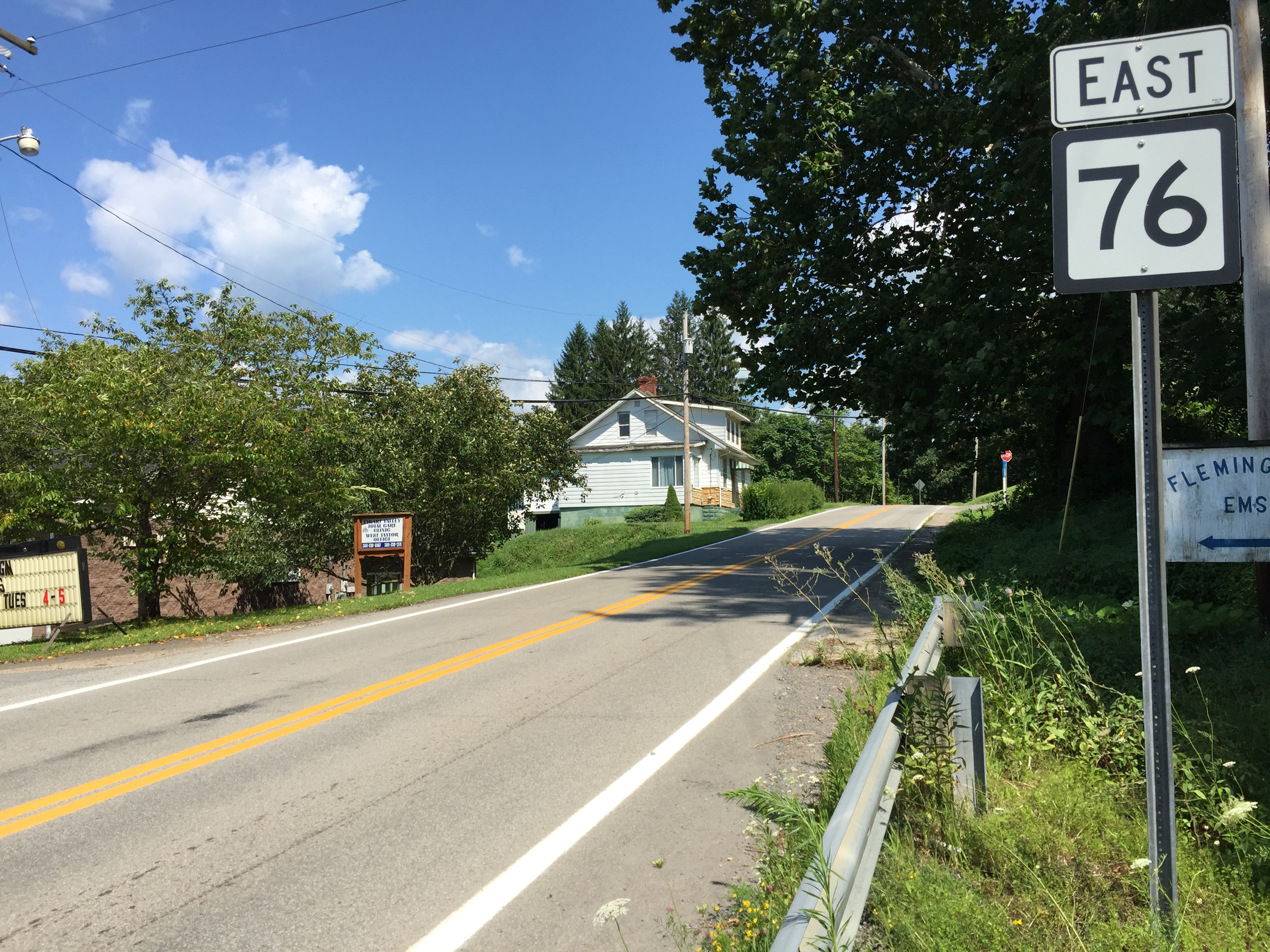
View east along WV 76 in Flemington

West Virginia Route 76 is an east–west state highway in northern West Virginia. The western terminus of the route is at U.S. Route 50 in the shadow of Bridgeport's Benedum Airport. The eastern terminus is at U.S. Route 119 and U.S. Route 250 three miles (5 km) north of Philippi.

== Major intersections ==
County	Location	mi	km	Destinations	Notes
Harrison	Bridgeport			US 50 – Clarksburg, Grafton	
Barbour	Corder Crossing			US 119 / US 250	
1.000 mi = 1.609 km; 1.000 km = 0.621 mi
