= Belington, West Virginia =

- City
- Logo

- Location of Belington in Barbour County, West Virginia.
- Coordinates: 39°1′33″N 79°56′17″W
- Country: United States
- State: West Virginia
- County: Barbour
- Districts: Barker (Wards 1, 2); Valley (Wards 3, 4)
- Settled: 1766-70
- Incorporated: 1894-08-22
- Named for: John Bealin

Government
  - Type: Mayor & City Council
  - Mayor: Cherri Sturm

Area
  - Total: 2.13 sq mi (5.52 km^{2})
  - Land: 2.06 sq mi (5.34 km^{2})
  - Water: 0.069 sq mi (0.18 km^{2})
- Elevation: 1,703 ft (519 m)

Population (2020)
  - Total: 1,805
  - Estimate (2021): 1,803
  - Density: 922.7/sq mi (356.24/km^{2})
- Time zone: UTC-5 (Eastern (EST))
  - Summer (DST): UTC-4 (EDT)
- ZIP code: 26250
- Area code: 304
- FIPS code: 54-05788
- GNIS feature ID: 1535594
- Website: cityofbelington.com

Belington is a town in Barbour County, West Virginia, United States, situated along the Tygart Valley River. The population was 1,804 as of the 2020 census.

== History ==
Belington was founded in 1766–70. Originally it was known as the Barker Settlement, after Elias Barker, who had settled there with his brother William Barker. About 1785, it was called Yeagers, taking its name from a settler, George Yeager, and his sons. In 1855, it took its current name, Belington, from John Bealin, who had opened up a store there, and who would later move to Kansas.

After the June 3, 1861 Battle of Philippi, the Confederate forces, having been routed by the Union Army in Philippi, retreated south. The Confederates made camp near the Laurel Mountain Road, today, a winding single lane dirt road that crosses the mountain and connects Belington with Elkins. This camp was the site of the Battle of Laurel Hill July 7-11, 1861.

A bridge spanning the Tygart Valley River at Belington was built in 1886.

In 1891, the West Virginia Central and Pittsburg Railway (later the Western Maryland Railway) was built into Belington. In 1894 the land on the east side of the river was incorporated as Belington, while the west side was incorporated as Alston in 1897. The two towns merged in 1906 to form the present Belington.

The Bernard E. Wilmoth House in Belington is a historic house listed on the National Register of Historic Places.

== Geography ==
Belington is located at 39°1′33″N 79°56′17″W (39.025706, -79.938166).

The town has a total area of 2.13 square miles (5.52 km^{2}), of which 2.06 square miles (5.34 km^{2}) is land and 0.07 square miles (0.18 km^{2}) is water.

== Demographics ==
Historical population
Census	Pop.	Note	%±
1900	430		—
1910	1,481		244.4%
1920	1,766		19.2%
1930	1,571		−11.0%
1940	1,517		−3.4%
1950	1,699		12.0%
1960	1,528		−10.1%
1970	1,567		2.6%
1980	2,038		30.1%
1990	1,850		−9.2%
2000	1,788		−3.4%
2010	1,921		7.4%
2020	1,805		−6.0%
2021 (est.)	1,803	▼	−0.1%
U.S. Decennial Census

=== 2010 census ===
As of the census of 2010, there were 1,921 people, 776 households, and 548 families living in the town. The population density was 932.5 inhabitants per square mile (360.0/km^{2}). There were 878 housing units at an average density of 426.2 units per square mile (164.6 units/km^{2}). The racial makeup of the town was 98.3% White, 0.3% African American, 0.1% Asian, 0.1% Pacific Islander, 0.5% from other races, and 0.8% from two or more races. Hispanic or Latino of any race were 1.0% of the population.

There were 776 households, of which 33.4% had children under the age of 18 living with them, 49.2% were married couples living together, 15.7% had a female householder with no husband present, 5.7% had a male householder with no wife present, and 29.4% were non-families. 23.6% of all households were made up of individuals, and 13.8% had someone living alone who was 65 years of age or older. The average household size was 2.48 and the average family size was 2.88.

The median age in the town was 40.9 years. 23.8% of residents were under the age of 18; 6.5% were between the ages of 18 and 24; 24.5% were from 25 to 44; 27% were from 45 to 64; and 18% were 65 years of age or older. The gender makeup of the town was 47.6% male and 52.4% female.

=== 2000 census ===
As of the census of 2000, there were 1,788 people, 713 households, and 518 families living in the town. The population density was 870.2 inhabitants per square mile (336.0 inhabitants/km^{2}). There were 790 housing units at an average density of 384.5 units per square mile (148.5 units/km^{2}). The racial makeup of the town was 98.66% White, 0.06% African American, 0.17% Native American, 0.06% Asian, 0.06% Pacific Islander, and 1.01% from two or more races. Hispanic or Latino of any race were 0.67% of the population.

There were 713 households, out of which 33.7% had children under the age of 18 living with them, 54.1% were married couples living together, 14.7% had a female householder with no husband present, and 27.3% were non-families. 23.8% of all households were made up of individuals, and 11.5% had someone living alone who was 65 years of age or older. The average household size was 2.51 and the average family size was 2.95.

In the town, the population was spread out, with 26.3% under the age of 18, 7.7% from 18 to 24, 26.2% from 25 to 44, 24.0% from 45 to 64, and 15.8% who were 65 years of age or older. The median age was 38 years. For every 100 females, there were 97.4 males. For every 100 females age 18 and over, there were 89.2 males.

The median income for a household in the town was $22,154, and the median income for a family was $28,500. Males had a median income of $25,809 versus $15,050 for females. The per capita income for the town was $12,905. About 18.3% of families and 20.9% of the population were below the poverty line, including 29.9% of those under age 18 and 7.7% of those age 65 or over.

== Climate ==
The climate in this area has mild differences between highs and lows, and there is adequate rainfall year-round. According to the Köppen Climate Classification system, Belington has a marine west coast climate, abbreviated "Cfb" on climate maps.

Climate data for Belington, West Virginia(1981-2010)
Month	Jan	Feb	Mar	Apr	May	Jun	Jul	Aug	Sep	Oct	Nov	Dec	Year
Mean maximum °F (°C)	63 (17)	66 (19)	74 (23)	82 (28)	85 (29)	88 (31)	89 (32)	89 (32)	86 (30)	79 (26)	74 (23)	64 (18)	89 (32)
Mean daily maximum °F (°C)	39.0 (3.9)	42.7 (5.9)	51.5 (10.8)	62.9 (17.2)	71.1 (21.7)	78.7 (25.9)	81.8 (27.7)	80.7 (27.1)	74.7 (23.7)	64.3 (17.9)	54.2 (12.3)	42.7 (5.9)	62.0 (16.7)
Daily mean °F (°C)	29.0 (−1.7)	31.3 (−0.4)	39.1 (3.9)	49.4 (9.7)	57.7 (14.3)	66.8 (19.3)	70.2 (21.2)	69.3 (20.7)	62.3 (16.8)	50.5 (10.3)	42.3 (5.7)	32.6 (0.3)	50.0 (10.0)
Mean daily minimum °F (°C)	18.9 (−7.3)	19.9 (−6.7)	26.9 (−2.8)	35.4 (1.9)	44.5 (6.9)	54.7 (12.6)	58.5 (14.7)	57.5 (14.2)	49.9 (9.9)	37.2 (2.9)	30.1 (−1.1)	22.5 (−5.3)	38.0 (3.3)
Mean minimum °F (°C)	−4 (−20)	−1 (−18)	10 (−12)	20 (−7)	30 (−1)	41 (5)	46 (8)	47 (8)	37 (3)	24 (−4)	15 (−9)	3 (−16)	−4 (−20)
Average precipitation inches (mm)	3.27 (83)	3.44 (87)	4.47 (114)	4.27 (108)	5.32 (135)	4.94 (125)	5.12 (130)	3.67 (93)	3.98 (101)	3.06 (78)	3.58 (91)	3.87 (98)	48.99 (1,243)
Average snowfall inches (cm)	16.4 (42)	13.0 (33)	5.6 (14)	1.1 (2.8)	0.0 (0.0)	0.0 (0.0)	0.0 (0.0)	0.0 (0.0)	0.0 (0.0)	0.2 (0.51)	1.9 (4.8)	8.6 (22)	46.8 (119.11)
Average extreme snow depth inches (cm)	8 (20)	6 (15)	4 (10)	1 (2.5)	0 (0)	0 (0)	0 (0)	0 (0)	0 (0)	0 (0)	1 (2.5)	5 (13)	8 (20)
Average precipitation days (≥ 0.01 inches)	15	14	14	14	13	12	11	10	10	9	11	17	150
Average snowy days (≥ 0.01 inches)	8	6	3	1	0	0	0	0	0	0	1	5	24
Average relative humidity (%)	84	84	81	79	79	78	78	78	79	80	78	83	80
Mean monthly sunshine hours	105.4	115.8	176.7	234	269.7	288	297.6	297	255	170.5	153	124	2,486.7
Mean daily sunshine hours	3.4	4.1	5.7	7.8	8.7	9.6	9.6	9.9	8.5	5.5	5.1	4	6.8
Mean daily daylight hours	9.8	10.8	12	13.3	14.3	14.9	14.6	13.6	12.4	11.2	10	9.5	12.2
Average ultraviolet index	2	2	2	4	5	5	5	5	4	3	2	2	3
Source 1: National Weather service
Source 2: Weather atlas(Humidity - Sunshine - UV)

== Notable people ==
- Mary McClung, professor of theatrical costume design and puppetry at West Virginia University

== See also ==
- The Golden Rule (Belington, West Virginia)
