= Barbour County, West Virginia =

County in West Virginia, United States

Barbour County
- County
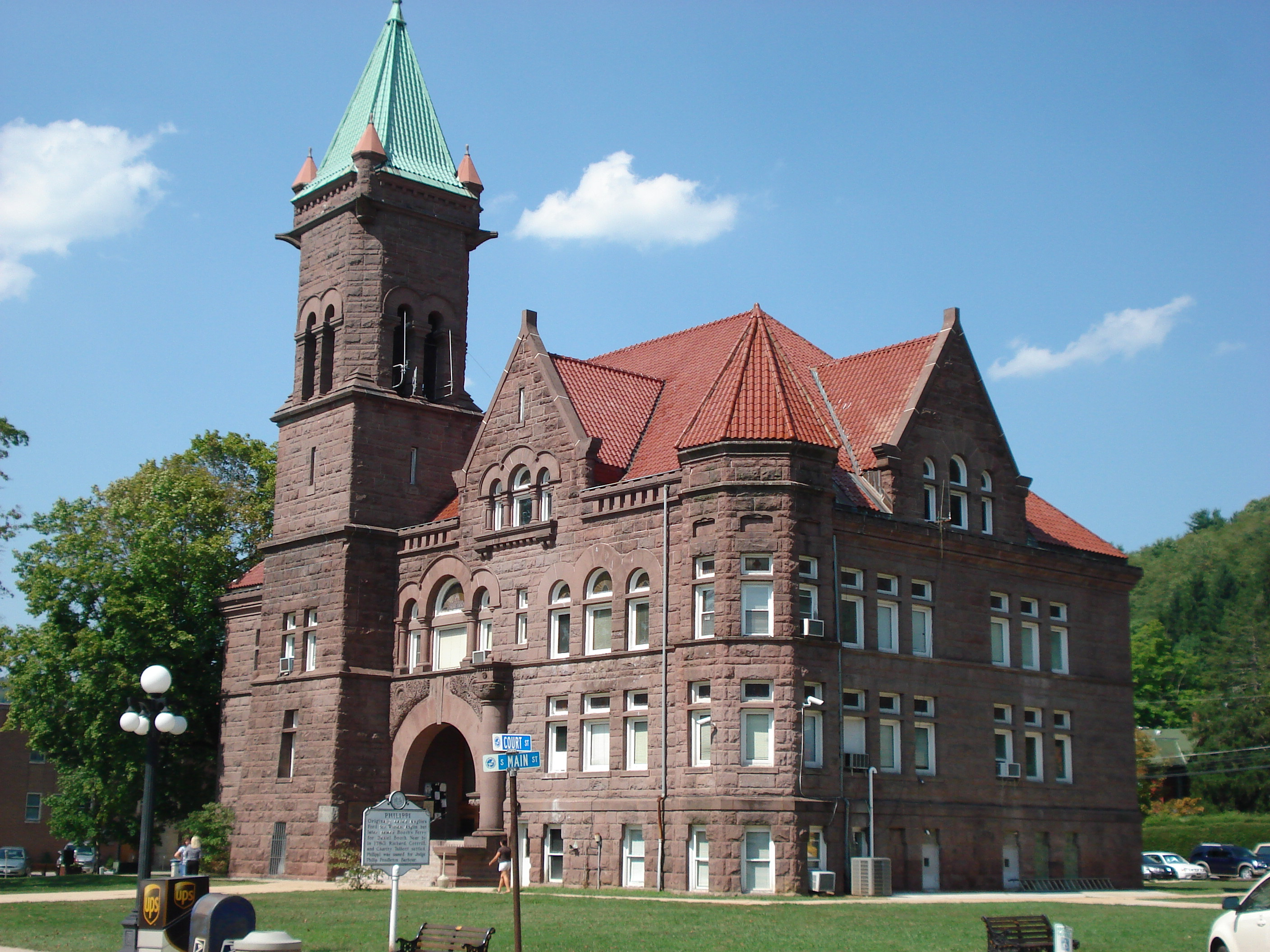
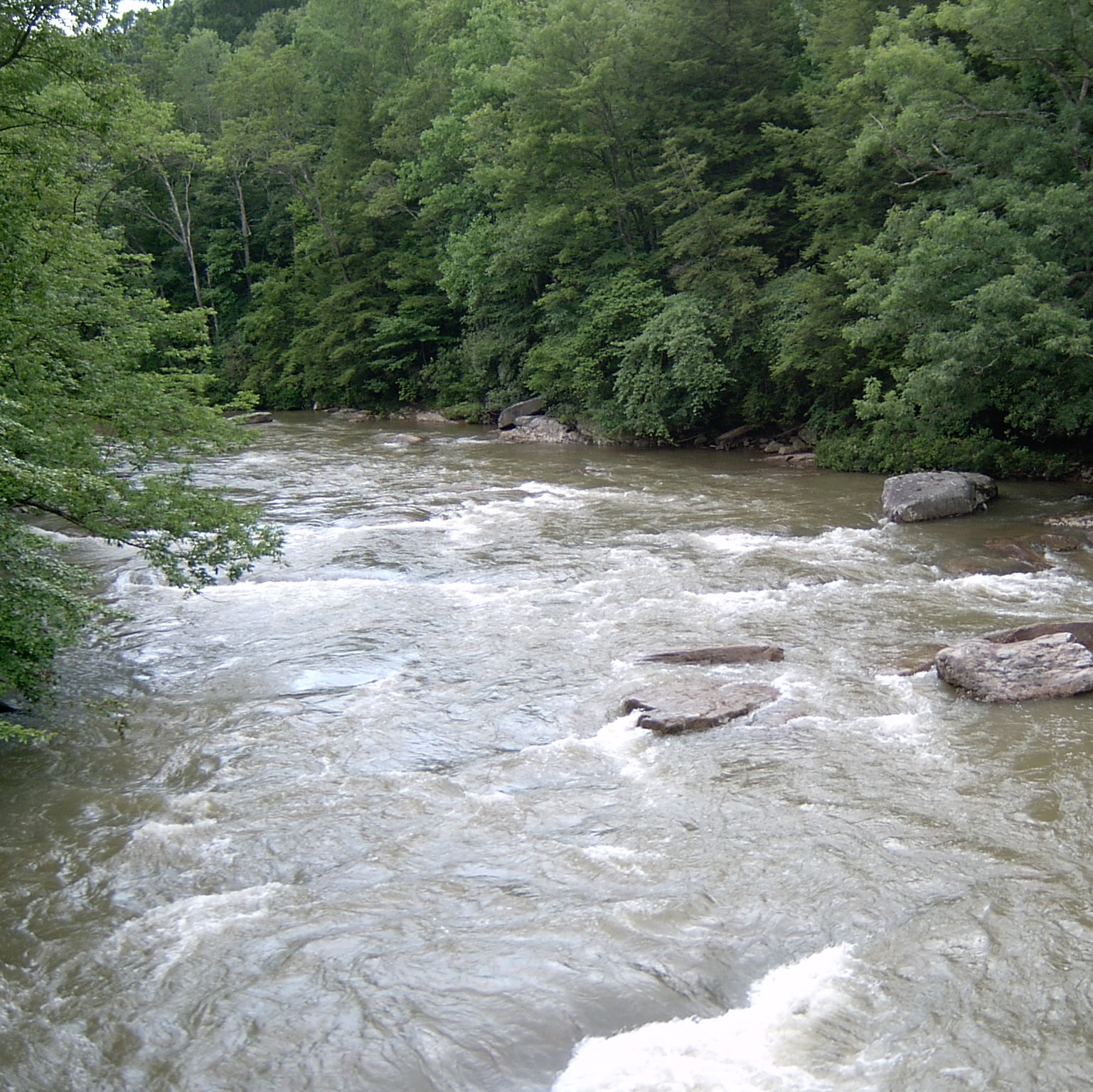
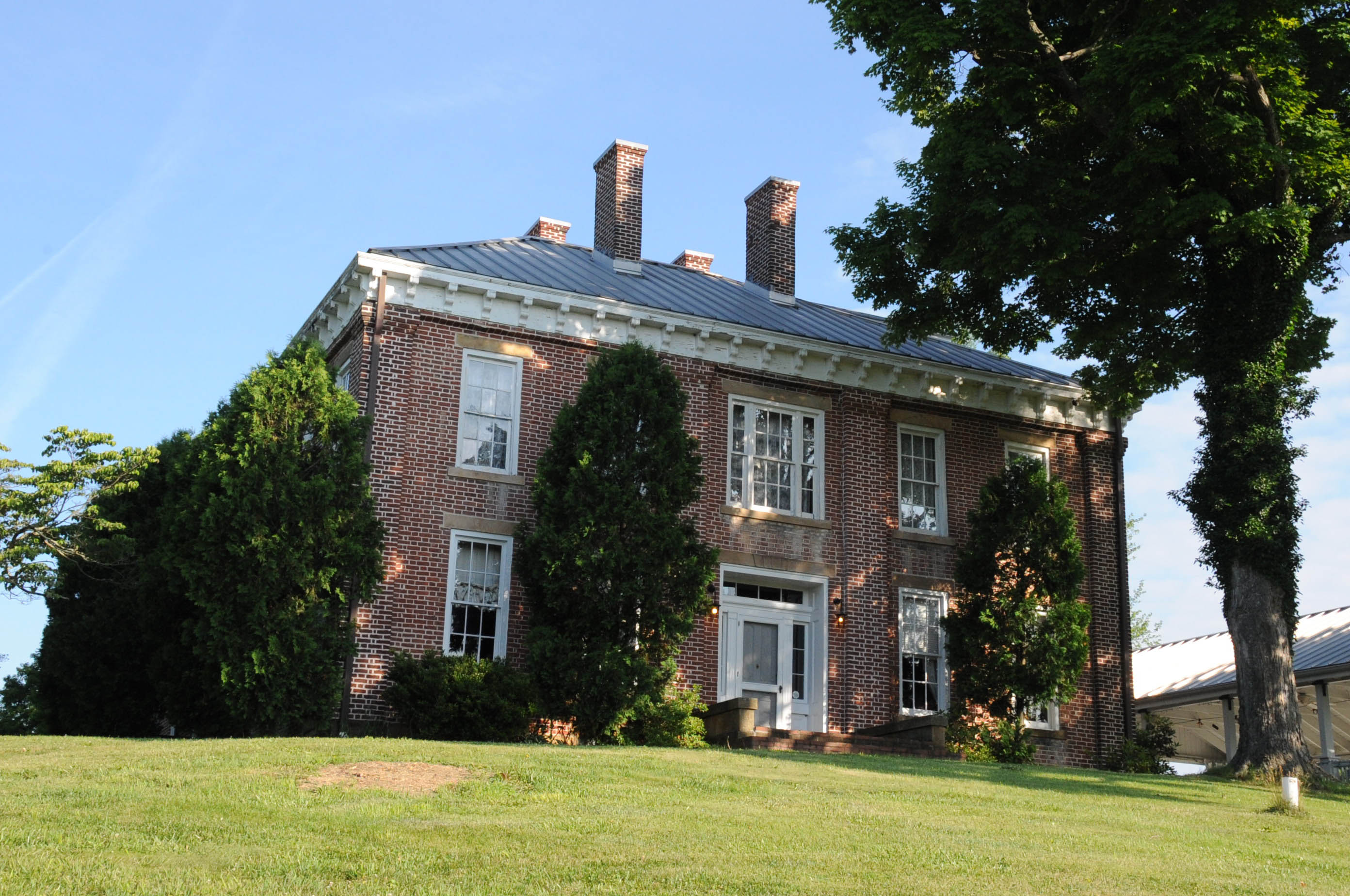
- Barbour County Courthouse in Philippi Audra State Park Adaland Philippi Covered Bridge

- Flag

- Location of Barbour County in West Virginia

- West Virginia's location within the U.S.
- Coordinates: 39.13°N 80°W
- Country: United States
- State: West Virginia
- Founded: March 3, 1843
- Named for: Philip P. Barbour
- Seat: Philippi
- and largest city

Government
  - County Administrator: Shana Frey
  - County Commission: David Strait (R); Jamie Carpenter (R); Jedd Schola (R)

Area
  - Total: 342.85 sq mi (888.0 km^{2})
  - Land: 341.06 sq mi (883.3 km^{2})
  - Water: 1.79 sq mi (4.6 km^{2}) 0.5%
  - Rank: 37th

Population (2020)
  - Total: 15,465
  - Estimate (2025): 15,414 ▼
  - Rank: 36th
  - Density: 45.344/sq mi (17.507/km^{2})
- Time zone: UTC−5 (Eastern)
  - Summer (DST): UTC−4 (EDT)
- Area codes: 304, 681
- Congressional district: 2nd
- Senate district: 11th
- House of Delegates district: 68th
- Website: https://barbourcountywv.gov/

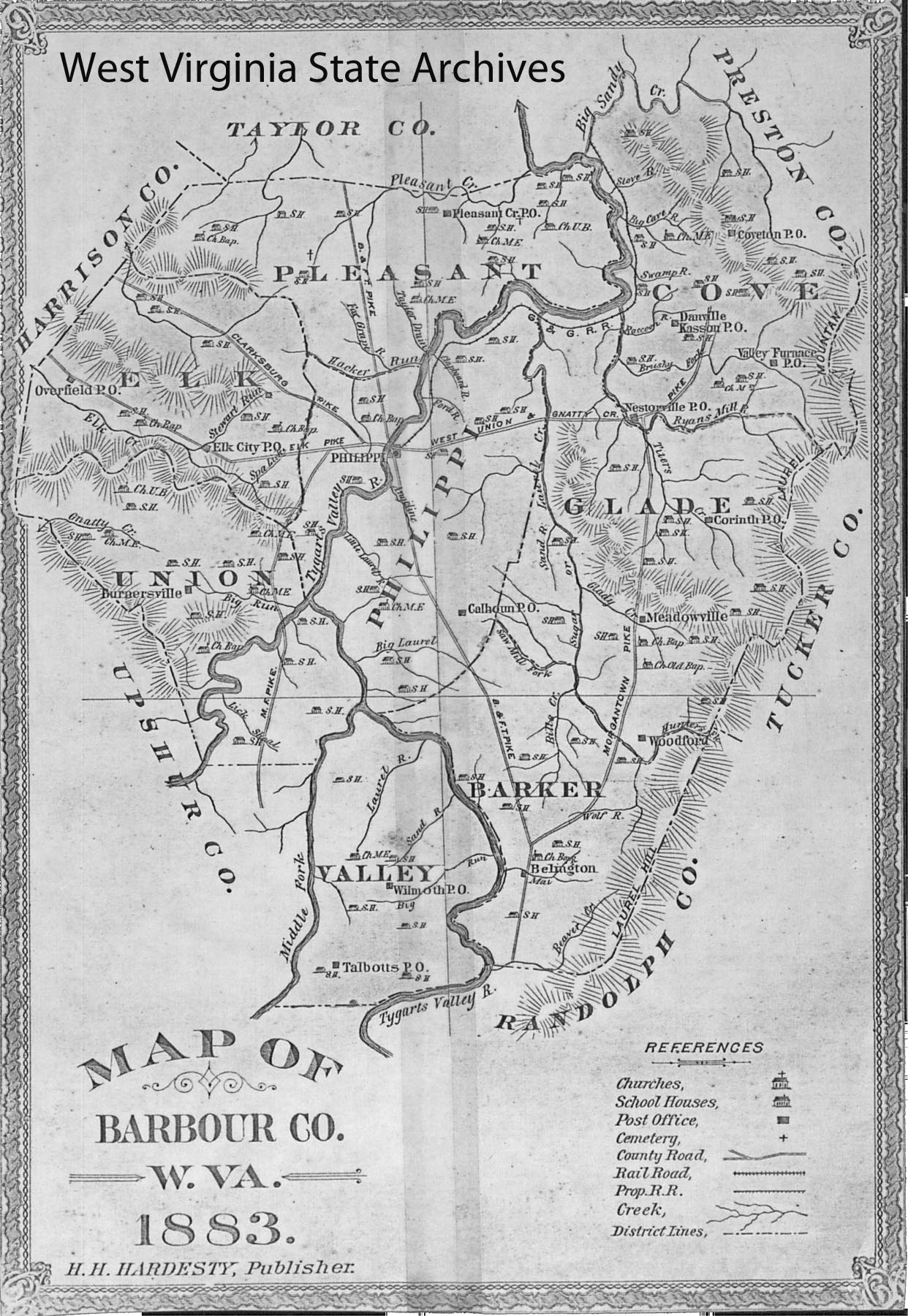
"Map of Barbour County, W.Va., 1883", showing its eight magisterial districts

Barbour County is a county in north central West Virginia, United States. At the 2020 census, the population was 15,465. The county seat is Philippi, which was chartered in 1844. Both county and city were named for Philip P. Barbour (1783–1841), a U.S. Congressman from Virginia and Associate Justice of the U.S. Supreme Court. The county was formed in 1843 when the region was still part of the state of Virginia. In 1871, a small part of Barbour County was transferred to Tucker County, West Virginia.

The Battle of Philippi, also known as the "Philippi Races", was fought in Barbour County on June 3, 1861. Although a minor action, it is generally considered the first land engagement of the American Civil War.

For 114 years (1909-2023), Barbour County was home to Alderson-Broaddus College (later Alderson Broaddus University), an American Baptist institution. Its four-year Physician Assistant (PA) baccalaureate program was the first such anywhere.

== History ==
=== Settlement and formation ===
The first white settlement in present-day Barbour County was established in 1780 by Richard Talbott – along with his brother Cotteral and sister Charity – about three miles (4.8 km) downriver from the future site of Philippi. At this time the region was still a part of Monongalia County, Virginia. The region had had no permanent Indian settlements and so conflicts with Native Americans were relatively infrequent in the early days. Nevertheless, the Talbotts were obliged to leave their homestead several times for safety and twice found it necessary to retreat back east of the Alleghenies, returning each time. No member of this eventually large family was ever killed by Indian attacks.

Over time, parts of the future Barbour County were included in the newly created Harrison (1784), Randolph (1787), and Lewis (1816) Counties. Barbour County itself was created in 1843 and named for the late Virginia politician and jurist Philip P. Barbour (1783–1841). (Barbour had served as a U.S. Congressman from Virginia, Speaker of the House, and Associate Justice of the United States Supreme Court.) The settlement of Philippi – formerly "Anglin's Ford" and "Booth's Ferry" – was platted, named, and made the county seat in the same year; it was chartered in 1844. By the 1850s, when a major covered bridge was constructed at Philippi to service travellers on the Beverly-Fairmont Turnpike, the county's population was approaching 10,000 people.

The first newspaper in the county was the Barbour Jeffersonian, published starting in August 1857 and running only to about June 1861. It was put out by Thompson Surghnor (1820-1864).

=== Civil War ===
In April 1861, an Ordinance of Secession from the United States of America was approved throughout the state of Virginia in a referendum. Delegates from 25 western counties, however, assembled at Wheeling on 13 May for the first of a two meetings (see Wheeling Convention) called to repeal the Ordinance. The delegates from Barbour County for the first convention were Spencer Dayton, John H. Shuttleworth, and E.H. Manafee. Barbour County had voted in favor of Virginia's secession, though, and a palmetto secession flag had been flying above the courthouse since January, 1861.

On 3 June 1861, Philippi was the scene of one of the first battles of the American Civil War. The battle was later lampooned as the "Philippi Races" because of the hurried retreat by the Confederate troops encamped in the town. (The skirmish is reenacted every June during the town's "Blue and Gray Reunion".) At daylight on June 3, two columns of Union forces under the command of Col. Benjamin Franklin Kelley and Col. Ebenezer Dumont, with perhaps 3,000 men, arrived from Grafton and attacked about 800 poorly armed Confederate recruits under the command of Col. George A. Porterfield. The Union troops had marched all night through a heavy rain storm to arrive just before daylight. The surprise attack awakened the sleeping Confederates. After firing a few shots at the advancing Union troops, the Southerners broke lines and began running frantically to the south, some still in their bed clothes.

The Union victory in a relatively bloodless battle propelled the young Major General George B. McClellan into the national spotlight, and he would soon be given command of all Union armies. The battle also inspired more vocal protests in the Western part of Virginia against secession. On 11 June, the second Wheeling Convention met in that city and Barbour County was again represented by Dayton and Shuttleworth, who were this time joined by N.H. Taft. The Convention nullified the Virginia Ordinance of Secession and named Francis H. Pierpont governor. These events would eventually result in the separate statehood of West Virginia.

=== Later history ===
The economy and infrastructure in Barbour grew steadily, but slowly, through the late 19th century. Although the first railroad had reached nearby Grafton in 1852, a narrow-gauge railroad was not laid through the county until the early 1880s; a standard gauge line followed in the 1890s.

In 1990, private developers offered Barbour County citizens $4M to $6M annually in host fees to accept out-of-state garbage into a County landfill over the following three decades. Up to 200,000 tons of garbage per month would be delivered. (At the time, the county's annual budget was only about $1M.) County voters rejected the offer.

In 2023, Barbour County lost its major employer when Alderson-Broaddus University's board of trustees voted to close the institution some 152 years after its founding.

=== Registered Historic Places ===
- Belington
  - Bernard E. Wilmoth House
- Berryburg
  - Adaland, restored home of a 19th-century lawyer
- Carrollton
  - Carrollton Covered Bridge
- Clemtown
  - Ida L. Reed Homestead
- Elk City
  - J. N. B. Crim House
- Philippi
  - Barbour County Courthouse
  - Peck-Crim-Chesser House
  - Philippi B & O Railroad Station
  - Philippi Covered Bridge
  - Philippi Historic District
  - Whitescarver Hall

== Geography ==
According to the United States Census Bureau, the county has a total area of 343 square miles (890 km^{2}), of which 341 square miles (880 km^{2}) is land and 1.8 square miles (4.7 km^{2}) (0.5%) is water.

Barbour County is situated on the Allegheny Plateau at the western edge of the Allegheny Mountains (represented by Laurel Mountain at the county's eastern boundary). Most of the county is drained by the Tygart Valley River which traverses it from south to north and on which its three largest settlements – Philippi, Belington, and Junior – are sited. Tributaries of the Tygart in the County include Teter Creek, Laurel Creek, Hacker's Creek, the Buckhannon River and the West Fork River. A portion of the County in the west drains into the Middle Fork River, principally through Elk Creek. Audra State Park – the county's only state park – is situated on the Middle Fork in the southwest corner. Teter Creek Lake Wildlife Management Area – the county's only WMA – is located on that stream and lake in the eastern portion. All of the mentioned streams are part of the greater Monongahela River watershed.

=== Major highways ===
- U.S. Highway 119
- U.S. Highway 250
- West Virginia Route 20
- West Virginia Route 38
- West Virginia Route 57
- West Virginia Route 76
- West Virginia Route 92

=== Adjacent counties ===
- Taylor County (north)
- Tucker County (east)
- Randolph County (southeast)
- Upshur County (southwest)
- Harrison County (west)
- Preston County (northeast)

== Demographics ==
Historical population
Census	Pop.	Note	%±
1850	9,005		—
1860	8,958		−0.5%
1870	10,312		15.1%
1880	11,870		15.1%
1890	12,702		7.0%
1900	14,198		11.8%
1910	15,858		11.7%
1920	18,028		13.7%
1930	18,628		3.3%
1940	19,869		6.7%
1950	19,745		−0.6%
1960	15,474		−21.6%
1970	14,030		−9.3%
1980	16,639		18.6%
1990	15,699		−5.6%
2000	15,557		−0.9%
2010	16,589		6.6%
2020	15,465		−6.8%
2025 (est.)	15,414	▼	−0.3%
U.S. Decennial Census; 1790–1960 1900–1990; 1990–2000 2010–2020

=== 2020 census ===
As of the 2020 census, there were 15,465 people residing in the county. There were 6,168 households in the county.

The racial makeup of the county was 93.5% White, 1.8% Black or African American, 0.2% American Indian and Alaska Native, 0.2% Asian, 0.3% from some other race, and 4.0% from two or more races. Hispanic or Latino residents of any race comprised 1.2% of the population.

Of the 6,168 households, 27.0% had children under the age of 18 living with them and 24.8% had a female householder with no spouse or partner present. About 27.7% of all households were made up of individuals and 13.6% had someone living alone who was 65 years of age or older.

There were 7,114 housing units, of which 13.3% were vacant. Among occupied housing units, 77.4% were owner-occupied and 22.6% were renter-occupied. The homeowner vacancy rate was 1.5% and the rental vacancy rate was 6.7%.

As of the 2020 census, 20.3% of residents were under the age of 18 and 21.1% were 65 years of age or older; the median age was 44.0 years. For every 100 females there were 99.8 males, and for every 100 females age 18 and over there were 99.6 males.

Barbour County, West Virginia – Racial and ethnic composition Note: the US Census treats Hispanic/Latino as an ethnic category. This table excludes Latinos from the racial categories and assigns them to a separate category. Hispanics/Latinos may be of any race.
Race / Ethnicity (NH = Non-Hispanic)	Pop 2000	Pop 2010	Pop 2020	% 2000	% 2010	% 2020
White alone (NH)	15,095	16,005	14,379	97.03%	96.47%	92.97%
Black or African American alone (NH)	77	120	259	0.49%	0.72%	1.67%
Native American or Alaska Native alone (NH)	111	91	37	0.71%	0.54%	0.23%
Asian alone (NH)	40	34	32	0.25%	0.20%	0.20%
Pacific Islander alone (NH)	2	3	0	0.01%	0.01%	0.00%
Other race alone (NH)	2	6	10	0.01%	0.03%	0.06%
Mixed race or Multiracial (NH)	157	234	556	1.00%	1.41%	3.59%
Hispanic or Latino (any race)	73	96	192	0.46%	0.57%	1.24%
Total	15,557	16,589	15,465	100.00%	100.00%	100.00%

=== 2010 census ===
As of the 2010 United States census, there were 16,589 people, 6,548 households, and 4,643 families residing in the county. The population density was 48.6 inhabitants per square mile (18.8/km^{2}). There were 7,849 housing units at an average density of 23.0 per square mile (8.9/km^{2}). The racial makeup of the county was 96.8% white, 0.7% black or African American, 0.6% American Indian, 0.2% Asian, 0.2% from other races, and 1.5% from two or more races. Those of Hispanic or Latino origin made up 0.6% of the population. In terms of ancestry, 23.4% were German, 22.3% were American, 13.6% were Irish, and 11.0% were English.

Of the 6,548 households, 30.7% had children under the age of 18 living with them, 54.8% were married couples living together, 10.9% had a female householder with no husband present, 29.1% were non-families, and 24.2% of all households were made up of individuals. The average household size was 2.46 and the average family size was 2.89. The median age was 41.5 years.

The median income for a household in the county was $31,212 and the median income for a family was $39,434. Males had a median income of $34,573 versus $21,797 for females. The per capita income for the county was $17,304. About 14.3% of families and 18.4% of the population were below the poverty line, including 27.5% of those under age 18 and 13.6% of those age 65 or over.

=== 2000 census ===
As of the census of 2000, there were 15,557 people, 6,123 households, and 4,365 families residing in the county. The population density was 46 people per square mile (18 people/km^{2}). There were 7,348 housing units at an average density of 22 per square mile (8.5/km^{2}). The racial makeup of the county was 97.36% White, 0.49% Black or African American, 0.71% Native American, 0.26% Asian, 0.02% Pacific Islander, 0.12% from other races, and 1.03% from two or more races. 0.47% of the population were Hispanic or Latino of any race. In addition, the area has a significant population of racially mixed (though often light-skinned and blue-eyed) people, known locally as 'the Chestnut Ridge people', whose specific origins are uncertain. They are categorized by many scholars among the Melungeons found scattered throughout Appalachia.

There were 6,123 households, out of which 30.10% had children under the age of 18 living with them, 57.20% were married couples living together, 10.30% had a female householder with no husband present, and 28.70% were non-families. 25.10% of all households were made up of individuals, and 12.60% had someone living alone who was 65 years of age or older. The average household size was 2.47 and the average family size was 2.94.

In the county, the population was spread out, with 23.00% under the age of 18, 9.40% from 18 to 24, 26.80% from 25 to 44, 25.20% from 45 to 64, and 15.60% who were 65 years of age or older. The median age was 39 years. For every 100 females there were 96.70 males. For every 100 females age 18 and over, there were 92.00 males.

The median income for a household in the county was $24,729, and the median income for a family was $29,722. Males had a median income of $24,861 versus $17,433 for females. The per capita income for the county was $12,440. 22.60% of the population and 18.40% of families were below the poverty line. Out of the total population, 32.00% of those under the age of 18 and 16.70% of those 65 and older were living below the poverty line.

== Politics ==
=== Federal politics ===
Barbour County lies within West Virginia's 2nd congressional district. The current representative of the district is Alex Mooney (R).

Barbour County was generally split for most of the twentieth century, though it tended to vote more for Democrats rather than Republicans. This is due to the county's split position in the American Civil War between Unionists and Secessionists. Since the 2000 presidential election, Barbour County has followed the trend with the rest of the state towards the Republicans.

United States presidential election results for Barbour County, West Virginia
Year	Republican		Democratic		Third party(ies)	
Year	No.	%	No.	%	No.	%
1912	607	16.45%	1,561	42.29%	1,523	41.26%
1916	2,083	52.23%	1,848	46.34%	57	1.43%
1920	3,763	56.58%	2,777	41.75%	111	1.67%
1924	3,347	45.41%	3,188	43.25%	836	11.34%
1928	4,023	53.54%	3,491	46.46%	0	0.00%
1932	3,652	45.52%	4,228	52.71%	142	1.77%
1936	3,875	42.13%	5,284	57.45%	39	0.42%
1940	4,576	47.66%	5,025	52.34%	0	0.00%
1944	3,993	51.78%	3,718	48.22%	0	0.00%
1948	3,834	47.33%	4,238	52.32%	28	0.35%
1952	4,504	50.08%	4,489	49.92%	0	0.00%
1956	4,460	54.61%	3,707	45.39%	0	0.00%
1960	4,006	51.20%	3,818	48.80%	0	0.00%
1964	2,533	34.74%	4,758	65.26%	0	0.00%
1968	3,206	47.28%	3,210	47.34%	365	5.38%
1972	4,432	66.25%	2,258	33.75%	0	0.00%
1976	3,235	47.01%	3,647	52.99%	0	0.00%
1980	3,311	46.73%	3,451	48.70%	324	4.57%
1984	3,877	55.43%	3,108	44.43%	10	0.14%
1988	3,023	48.28%	3,221	51.45%	17	0.27%
1992	2,322	33.39%	3,467	49.86%	1,165	16.75%
1996	2,155	35.64%	3,076	50.87%	816	13.49%
2000	3,411	56.37%	2,503	41.37%	137	2.26%
2004	4,004	60.17%	2,610	39.22%	41	0.62%
2008	3,685	59.13%	2,419	38.82%	128	2.05%
2012	3,824	66.19%	1,768	30.60%	185	3.20%
2016	4,527	74.02%	1,222	19.98%	367	6.00%
2020	5,116	76.62%	1,457	21.82%	104	1.56%
2024	5,071	79.30%	1,199	18.75%	125	1.95%

== Economy ==
Major employment in Barbour County is provided by health care and social service sectors, retail, education, accommodation and food services, logging and wood product manufacturing, trucking and construction. The largest employers are Alderson Broaddus University and Broaddus Hospital.

Bituminous coal mining has been significant in Barbour; seven times as much tonnage has been produced from underground as by surface mining. Natural gas and oil wells provide a modest amount of employment. Wholesale lumber production (wood and wood products) is also present. (The county is a member of the West Virginia Hardwood Alliance Zone.) There is notable production of eggs and horse raising, but the major agricultural products are livestock, forage, dairy foods and orchard fruits.

== Communities ==
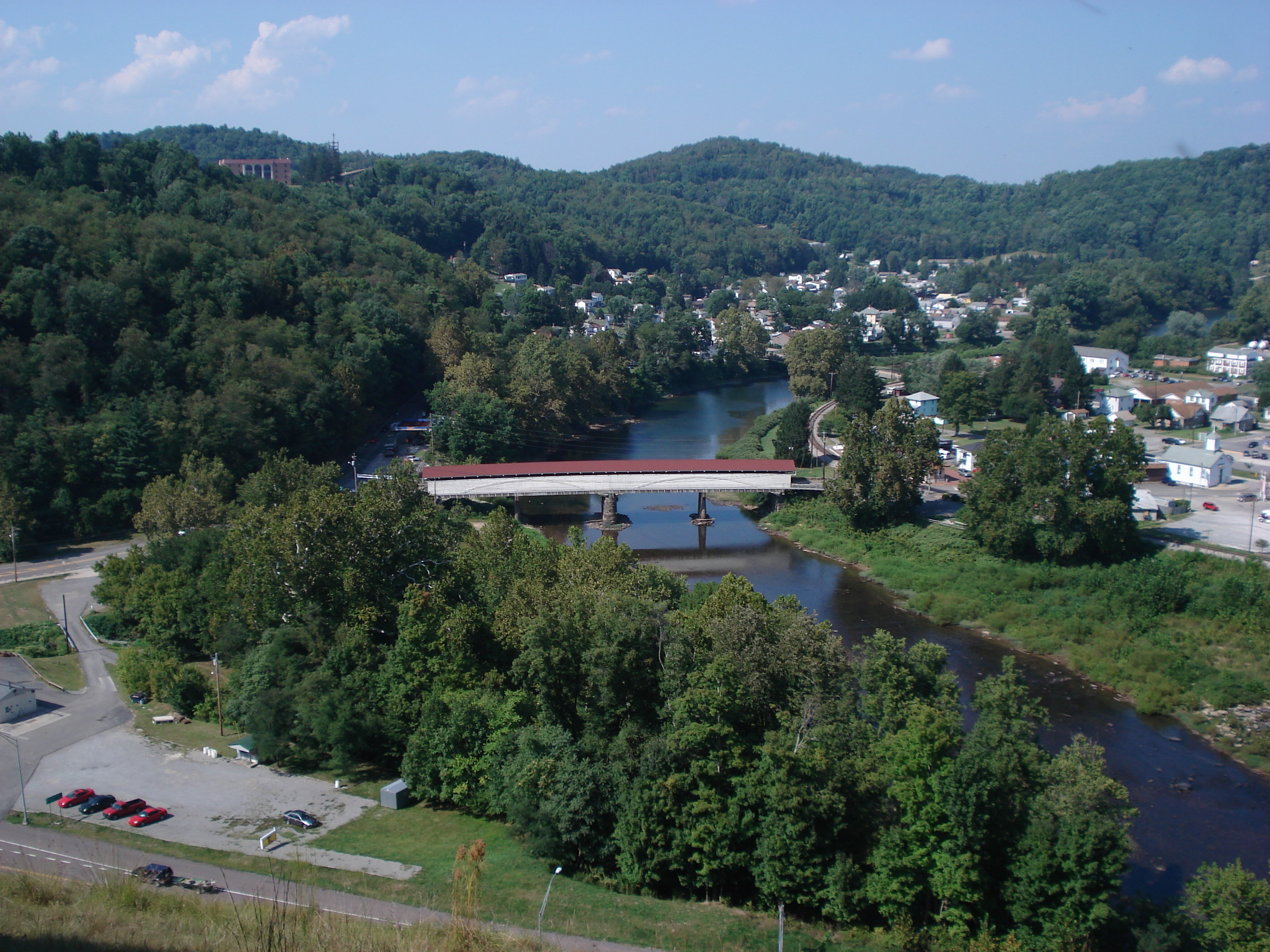
View of Philippi, county seat of Barbour County. Visible are the historic Philippi Covered Bridge spanning the Tygart Valley River and the main administrative building and chapel of Alderson Broaddus University atop "Battle Hill" (upper left) overlooking the town.

=== City ===
- Philippi (county seat)

=== Towns ===
- Belington
- Junior

=== Census-designated places ===
- Century
- Galloway

=== Unincorporated communities ===
- Adaland
- Adma
- Arden
- Audra
- Bear Mountain
- Berryburg
- Boulder (Rangoon)
- Brownton
- Calhoun
- Carrollton
- Century Junction
- Claude
- Clemtown
- Corley
- Cove Run
- Dartmoor
- Dent
- Elk City
- Finegan Ford
- Gage
- Hall
- Hopewell
- Independence
- Jones
- Kalamazoo
- Kasson
- Kirt
- Lantz
- Longview
- Mansfield
- Meadowville
- Meriden
- Middle Fork
- Moatsville
- Mount Liberty
- Murphy
- Nestorville
- Overfield
- Peeltree
- Pepper
- Pleasure Valley
- Stringtown
- Tacy
- Talbott
- Tygart Junction
- Union
- Valley Bend
- Valley Furnace
- Vannoys Mill
- Volga
- Wellington Heights
- Werner
- West Junior

=== Minor civil divisions ===
In 1863, West Virginia's counties were divided into civil townships, with the intention of encouraging local government. This proved impractical in the heavily rural state, and in 1872 the townships were converted into magisterial districts. Barbour County's original magisterial districts were Barker, Cove, Elk, Glade, Philippi, Pleasant, and Union. Between 1880 and 1890, part of Barker District was split off to form Valley District. These eight districts continued until the 1970s, when they were consolidated into three districts: North, South, and West.

The names and boundaries of Barbour county's historic magisterial districts were preserved as assessment and tax districts, alongside the corporations of Belington, Junior, and Philippi. The City of Philippi is divided into four wards, all of which are in Philippi District. The first and second wards of Belington are in Valley District, while the second and third ward are in Barker District.

== Notable natives and residents ==
- Ted Cassidy (1932–1979), actor who played Lurch and "Thing" on the 1960s TV show The Addams Family
- Larry Groce (b. 1948), noted singer and songwriter, lived near Galloway in the late 1980s
- Ann Maria Reeves Jarvis (1832–1905), social activist; with her daughter Anna Marie Jarvis (1864–1948), is credited with founding Mother's Day; lived in the county for several years
- William Smith O'Brien (1862–1948), US Congressman born in Audra
- Ida Lilliard Reed (1865–1951), noted hymn writer

== See also ==
- Chestnut Ridge people
- Barbour County Schools
- USS Barbour County (LST-1195)
- National Register of Historic Places listings in Barbour County, West Virginia
- West Virginia
  - List of municipalities in West Virginia
  - List of counties in West Virginia
  - West Virginia statistical areas
