= National Register of Historic Places listings in Barbour County, West Virginia =

Location of Barbour County in West Virginia

This is a list of the National Register of Historic Places listings in Barbour County, West Virginia.

This is intended to be a complete list of the properties and districts on the National Register of Historic Places in Barbour County, West Virginia, United States. The locations of National Register properties and districts for which the latitude and longitude coordinates are included below, may be seen in an online map.

There are 13 properties and districts listed on the National Register in the county.

This National Park Service list is complete through NPS recent listings posted January 2, 2026.

Contents: Counties in West Virginia

Barbour - Berkeley - Boone - Braxton - Brooke - Cabell - Calhoun - Clay - Doddridge - Fayette - Gilmer - Grant - Greenbrier - Hampshire - Hancock - Hardy - Harrison - Jackson - Jefferson - Kanawha - Lewis - Lincoln - Logan - Marion - Marshall - Mason - McDowell - Mercer - Mineral - Mingo - Monongalia - Monroe - Morgan - Nicholas - Ohio - Pendleton - Pleasants - Pocahontas - Preston - Putnam - Raleigh - Randolph - Ritchie - Roane - Summers - Taylor - Tucker - Tyler - Upshur - Wayne - Webster - Wetzel - Wirt - Wood - Wyoming

== Current listings ==
	Name on the Register	Image	Date listed	Location	City or town	Description
1	Adaland	Adaland	April 14, 1995 (#95000419)	County Route 77/5 off WV 76 at Fox Grape Run; 39°12′04″N 80°04′13″W	Berryburg	
2	Barbour County Courthouse	Barbour County Courthouse	February 22, 1980 (#80004014)	Court Sq. 39°09′09″N 80°02′22″W	Philippi	
3	Carrollton Covered Bridge	Carrollton Covered Bridge	June 4, 1981 (#81000595)	County Route 36; 39°05′24″N 80°05′12″W	Carrollton	
4	Citizens National Bank of Belington		January 9, 2026 (#100012522)	5 Crim Avenue; 39°01′30″N 79°56′08″W	Belington	
5	J.N.B. Crim House	J.N.B. Crim House	August 24, 1984 (#84003462)	WV 57; 39°08′38″N 80°07′09″W	Elk City	
6	The Golden Rule	The Golden Rule	April 23, 2019 (#100003667)	122 Crim Avenue; 39°01′25″N 79°56′11″W	Belington	
7	Peck-Crim-Chesser House	Peck-Crim-Chesser House	August 23, 1984 (#84003464)	14 N. Walnut St. 39°09′12″N 80°02′21″W	Philippi	
8	Philippi B & O Railroad Station	Philippi B & O Railroad Station	May 16, 1986 (#86001082)	146 N. Main St. 39°09′12″N 80°02′35″W	Philippi	
9	Philippi Covered Bridge	Philippi Covered Bridge	September 14, 1972 (#72001284)	U.S. Route 250 at its junction with U.S. Route 119; 39°09′11″N 80°02′37″W	Philippi	
10	Philippi Historic District	Philippi Historic District	August 29, 1990 (#90001241)	Roughly bounded by Pike, High, Walnut, Wolfe, Main, and Wilson Sts., and the Tygart Valley River; 39°09′00″N 80°02′20″W	Philippi	
11	Valley Furnace		July 21, 2023 (#100009138)	WV 38, approx. 750 ft. west of South Shilo Rd. (Cty. Rd. 52); 39°11′46″N 79°52′03″W	Valley Furnace	
12	Whitescarver Hall	Whitescarver Hall	February 5, 1990 (#89002317)	Circle Dr. on the Alderson Broaddus University campus 39°09′36″N 80°02′26″W	Philippi	
13	Bernard E. Wilmoth House	Bernard E. Wilmoth House	November 30, 2005 (#05001348)	303 Dayton Boulevard; 39°01′45″N 79°56′19″W	Belington	

== See also ==
- List of National Historic Landmarks in West Virginia
- National Register of Historic Places listings in West Virginia
