= J. N. B. Crim House =

United States historic place

- U.S. National Register of Historic Places
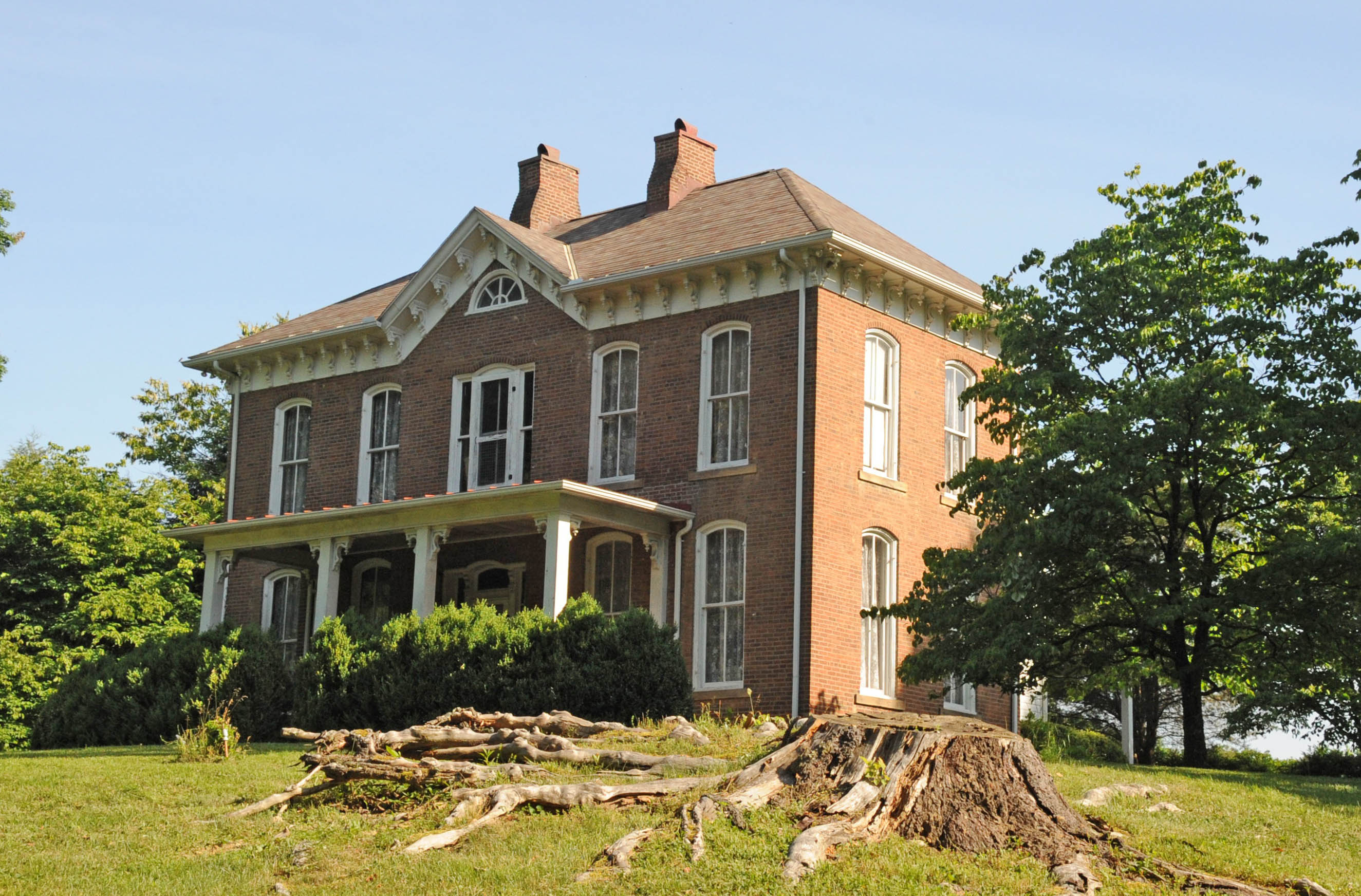

- Location within West Virginia Location within the United States
- Location: WV 57, Elk City, West Virginia
- Coordinates: 39°8′38″N 80°7′9″W
- Area: 2 acres (0.81 ha)
- Built: 1875
- Architectural style: Italianate
- NRHP reference No.: 84003462
- Added to NRHP: August 24, 1984

J. N. B. Crim House is a historic home located at Elk City, Barbour County, West Virginia. It was built in 1874–1875, and is a two-story, L-shaped, Italianate style brick house. It features an entrance portico with a flat roof supported by eight wrought iron columns. Joseph Napoleon Bonaparte Crim (1835–1905), for whom it was built, was a prominent local merchant and banker.

The house was listed on the National Register of Historic Places in 1984.

== See also ==
- National Register of Historic Places listings in Barbour County, West Virginia
- Peck-Crim-Chesser House
