= Hummelstown Brownstone Company =

- Quarries of the Hummelstown Brownstone Company
- U.S. National Register of Historic Places
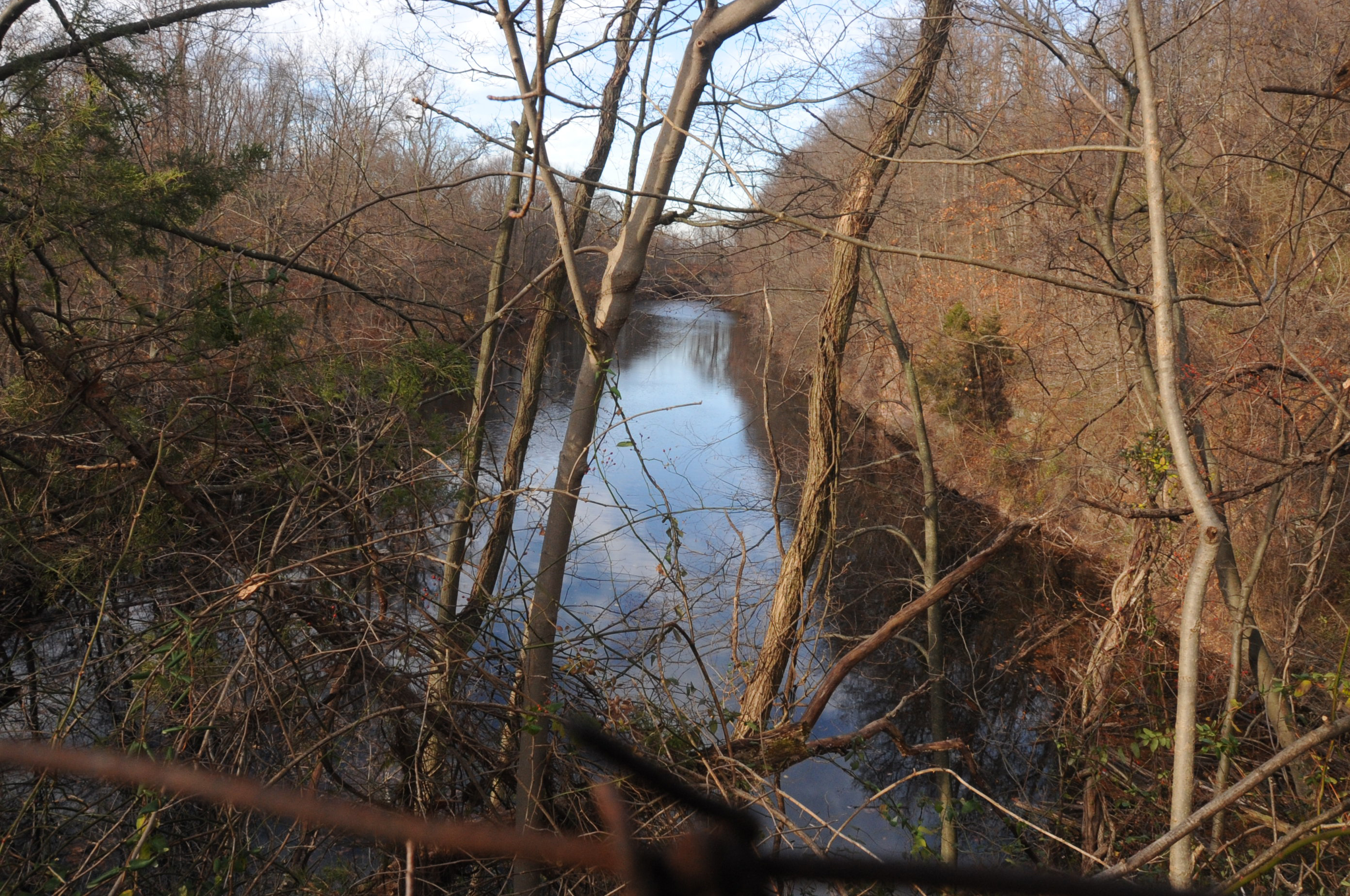

- Location within Pennsylvania Location within the United States
- Location: Roughly N of Brookline Dr., Amber Dr., Derry Township, Pennsylvania
- Coordinates: 40°13′48″N 76°41′30″W
- Area: 21 acres (8.5 ha)
- Built: 1891
- NRHP reference No.: 03000075
- Added to NRHP: February 27, 2003

From 1863 to 1929, the Hummelstown Brownstone Company owned and operated quarries in the Hummelstown, Pennsylvania area which produced Hummelstown brownstone, once widely used as a building stone throughout the US. The quarries of the Hummelstown Brownstone Company are listed on the National Register of Historic Places.

== History and operations ==
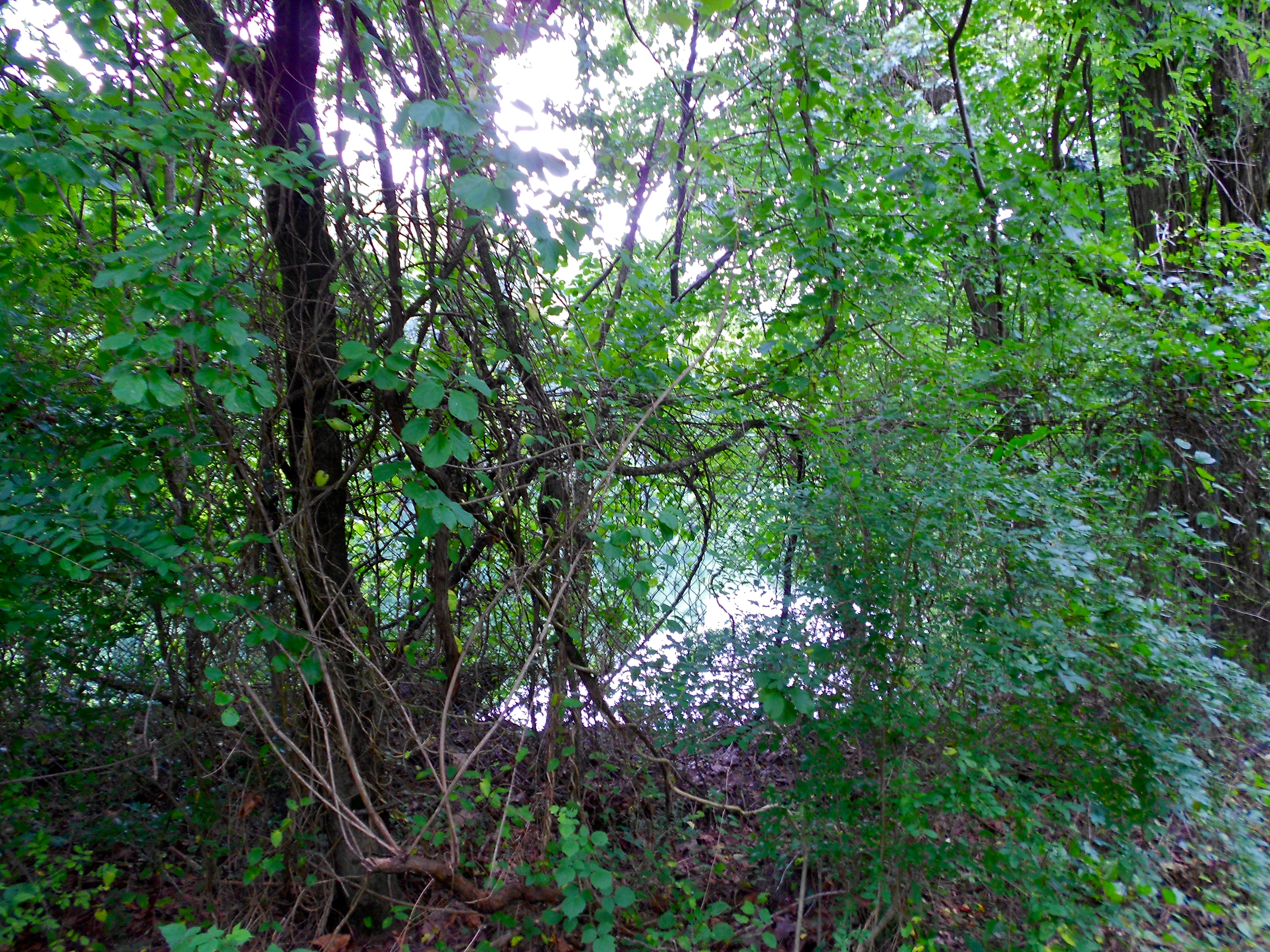
The area around the quarries is now fenced off and overgrown with vegetation

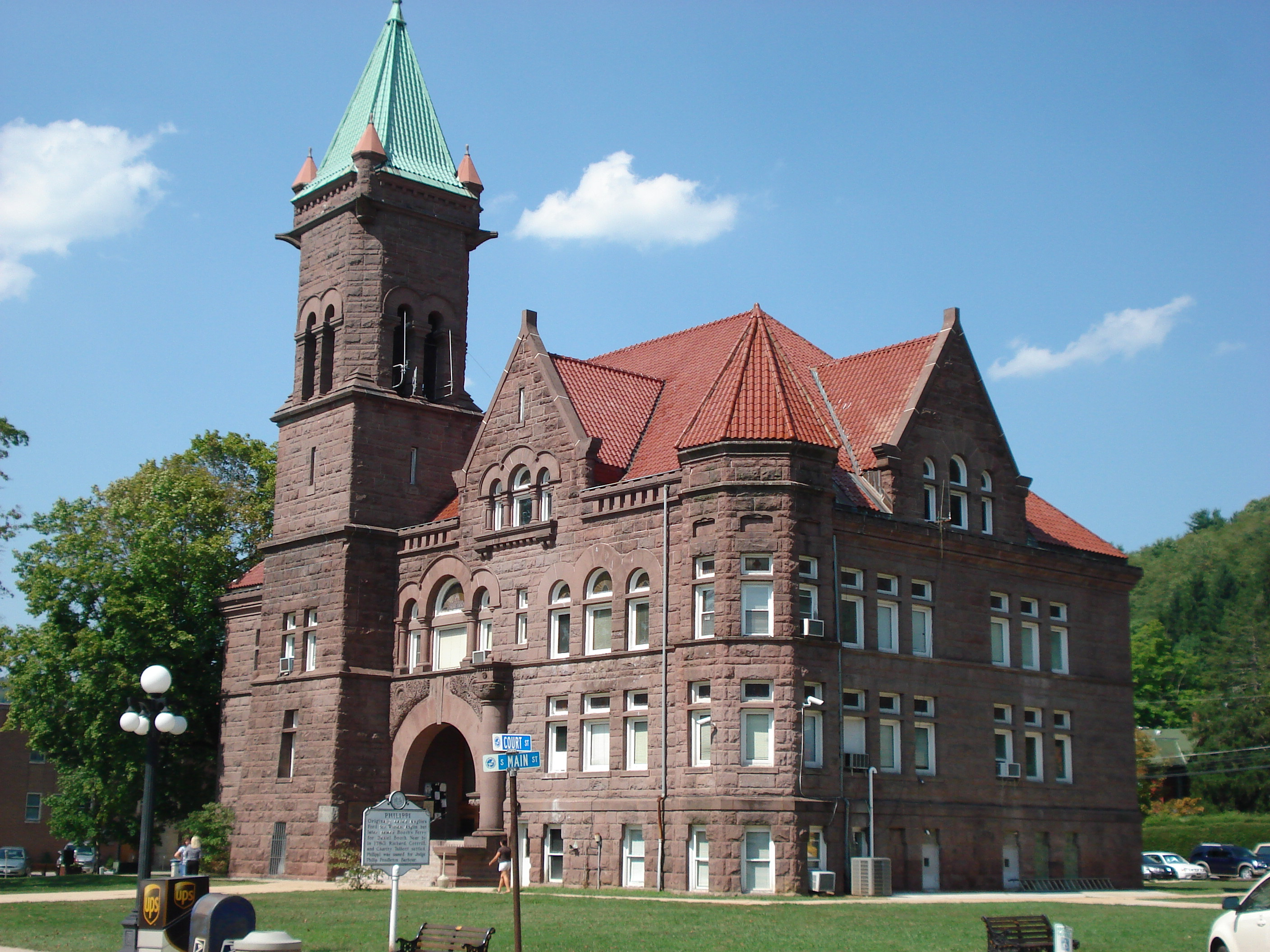
The Barbour County Courthouse (1903–05) in Philippi, West Virginia, USA; its exterior is faced entirely in Hummelstown brownstone.

Hummelstown brownstone pits were first opened by early German settlers in the late 18th Century. The Berst family were the original owners the present-day quarry site and in 1863 allowed two entrepreneurs to quarry stone from the land. By 1867, this venture had expanded to a four-man team which applied for a company charter, thus forming the Pennsylvania Brown Free Stone Company. Allen Walton, one of the original shareholders of the company, was appointed superintendent of the quarry in 1868, and after the turbulent economic years following the Civil War purchased the company outright in 1875. It continued with its chartered name until it was rechartered as the Hummelstown Brownstone Company in 1891.

At the height of its production, the company employed about 600 men in quarrying and finishing the stone. A standard gauge railroad, chartered as the Brownstone-Middletown Railroad Company, was connected to the quarry site between 1884 and 1885 linking it to the Philadelphia and Reading Railroad. Most of the skilled workers were Italian, German, and Scotch-Irish immigrants. However, because the nature of the stone made it impossible for the stone to be quarried in the cold of winter, only the skilled workers were kept on during the winter months.

Although not as large as the vast brownstone quarries at Portland, Connecticut, the Hummelstown operation was their equal in every respect and a viable competitor of most other brownstone quarries including those at Medina and Moscow, New York. To bolster sales, The Walton family commissioned an advertising booklet by J. Horace McFarland around 1910 which listed almost 400 structures built of their stone.

By the late 1920s, due to improved methods of building and changes in building color preference, demand for brownstone declined. In 1927, the operations of the quarry ceased. Two years later, with the onset of the Great Depression, the Hummelstown Brownstone Company was officially dissolved. During its 36 year history the quarry produced approximately 4.3 million cubic yards of stone.
