= Hummelstown brownstone =

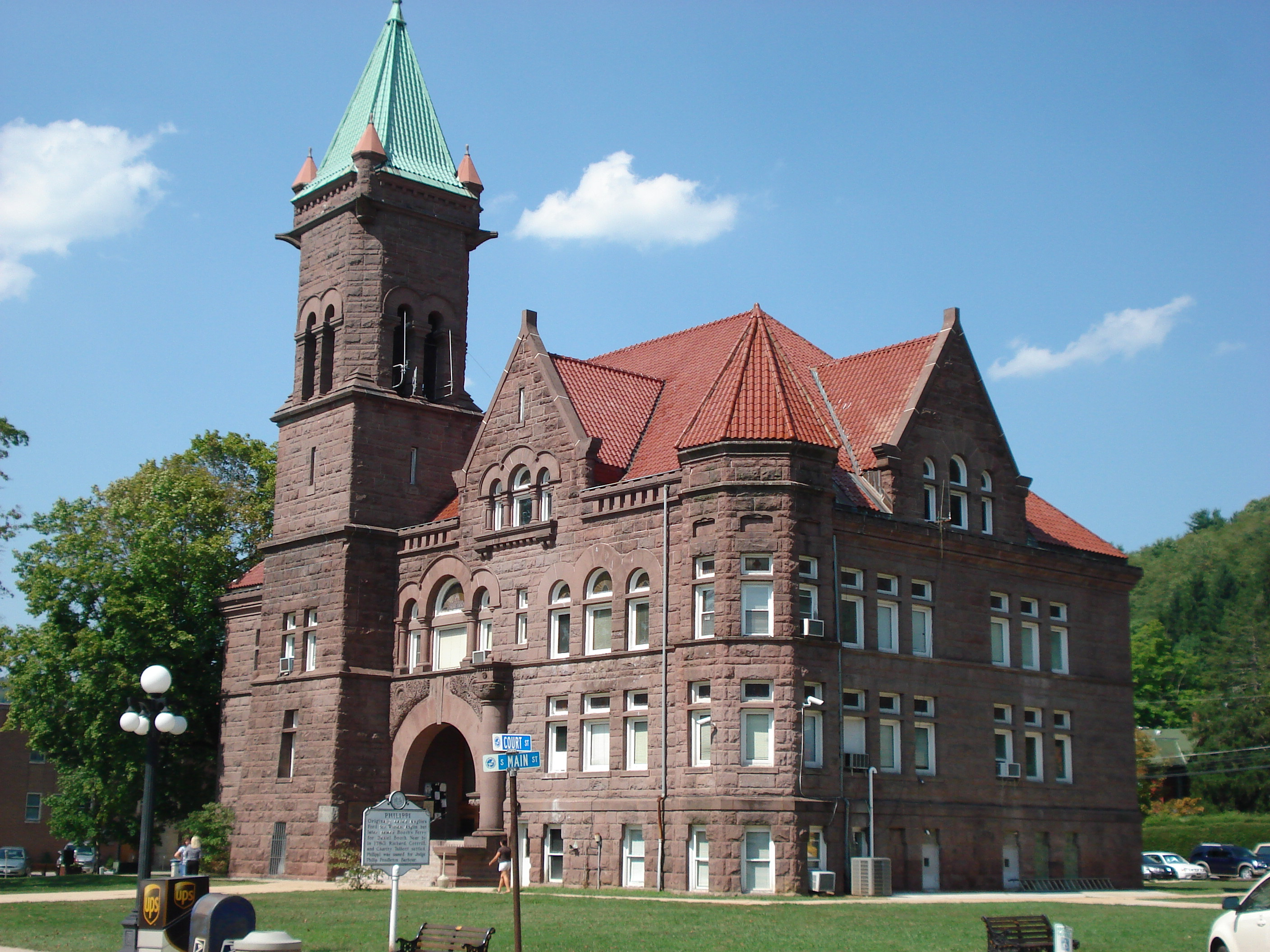
The Barbour County Courthouse (1903–05) in Philippi, West Virginia, USA; its exterior is faced entirely in Hummelstown brownstone.

Hummelstown brownstone is a medium-grain, dense sandstone quarried near Hummelstown in Dauphin County, Pennsylvania, USA. It is a dark brownstone with reddish to purplish hues, and was once widely used as a building stone in the United States.

== History ==
The Hummelstown Brownstone Company quarried high quality brownstone near Hummelstown from 1863 to 1929 and sold it across the U.S. as a preferred masonry material of builders. Because of its durability, it was used for a wide range of building projects, especially as trim and ornamentation on large buildings, but also as bridge piers and in the foundations and walls of buildings or the sculptures that decorated them. Frequently, entire buildings were dressed in Hummelstown brownstone. An example of this is the Barbour County Courthouse (1903–05) in Philippi, West Virginia.

Hummelstown brownstone and similar sandstones were known as “freestone” because of properties allowing them to be worked freely in every direction, rather than in one direction along a “grain”. This characteristic made them very popular with stone cutters and masons.
