= Philippi Historic District =

Historic district in West Virginia, United States

- U.S. National Register of Historic Places
- U.S. Historic district
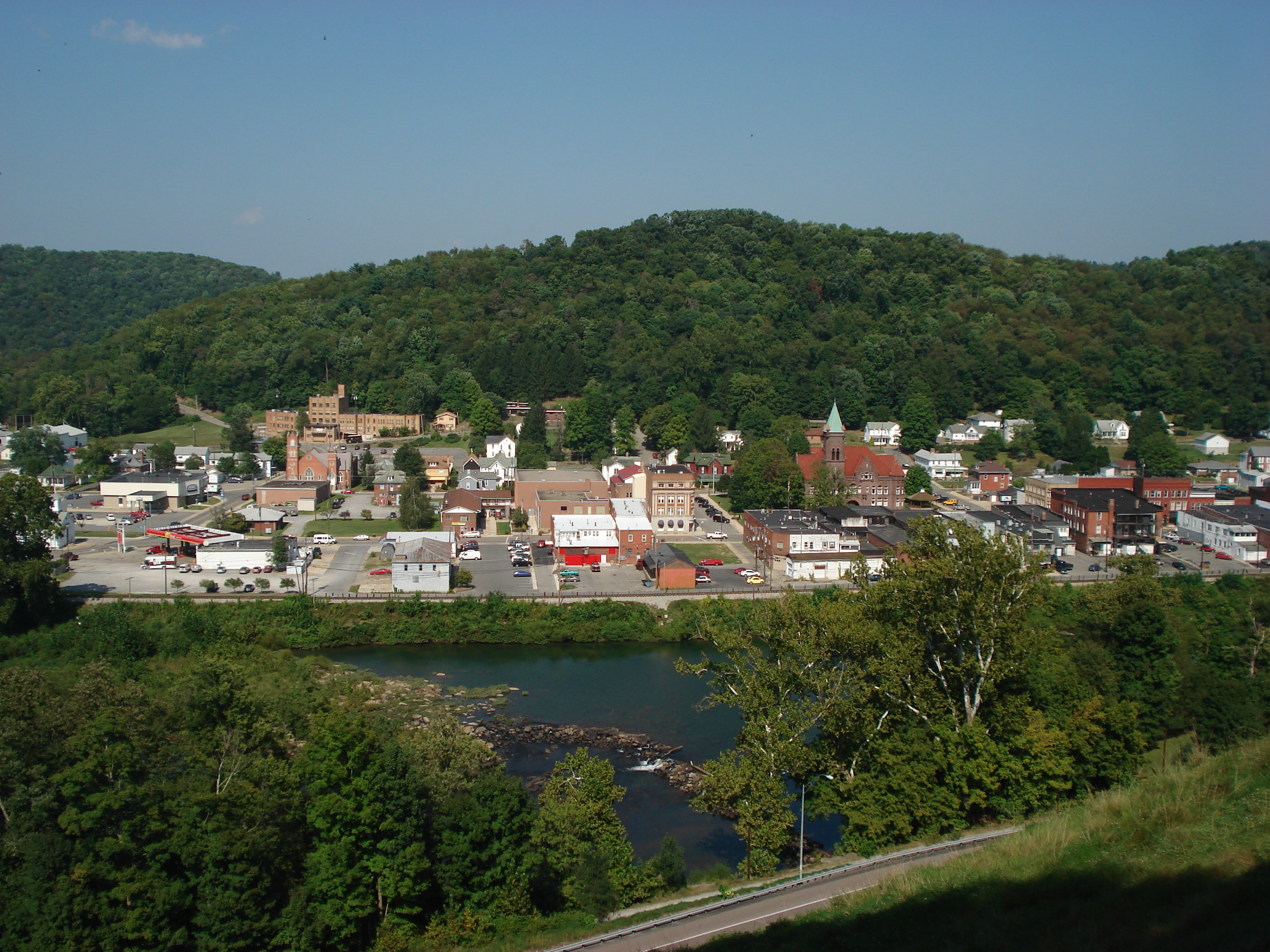
- Philippi, West Virginia, across the Tygart Valley River, September 2007

- Location within West Virginia Location within the United States
- Location: Roughly bounded by Pike, High, Walnut, Wolfe, Main, Wilson Sts., and Tygart Valley River, Philippi, West Virginia
- Coordinates: 39°9′0″N 80°2′20″W
- Area: 95 acres (38 ha)
- Built: 1852
- Architect: Fulton, J. Charles; Et al.
- Architectural style: Greek Revival, Italianate, Queen Anne
- NRHP reference No.: 90001241
- Added to NRHP: August 29, 1990

The Philippi Historic District (PHD) is national historic district located at Philippi, Barbour County, West Virginia, USA. It encompasses 113 contributing buildings and one contributing structure dating from the mid-19th century through early 20th century. The district includes the commercial, ecclesiastical, and civic core of the town situated along the Tygart Valley River.

The PHD includes a number of buildings representative of popular architectural styles including Queen Anne, Italianate, and Greek Revival. Located within the district are the separately listed Barbour County Courthouse, Philippi B & O Railroad Station, Philippi Covered Bridge, and Peck-Crim-Chesser House.

The PHD was listed on the National Register of Historic Places in 1990.
