= Elk City, West Virginia =

Unincorporated community in West Virginia, United States

Elk City
- Unincorporated community
- Location within the state of West Virginia Elk City (the United States)
- Coordinates: 39°8′32″N 80°6′29″W
- Country: United States
- State: West Virginia
- County: Barbour
- Elevation: 1,068 ft (326 m)
- Time zone: UTC-5 (Eastern (EST))
  - Summer (DST): UTC-4 (EDT)
- GNIS feature ID: 1538614

Elk City is an unincorporated community in Barbour County in the U.S. state of West Virginia. Elk City lies along West Virginia Route 57.

== History ==
Elk City was laid out in 1869. The community takes its name from nearby Elk Creek.

The J.N.B. Crim House in Elk City is a historic home listed on the National Register of Historic Places.
