= Philip Barbour High School =

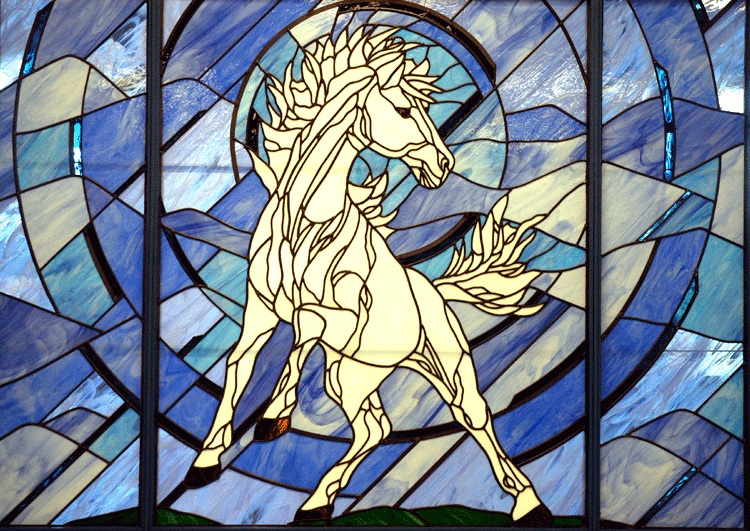
- Stained glass in commons of Philip Barbour High School

Location
- 99 Horseshoe Drive; Philippi, West Virginia 26416; United States; 39°06′33″N 79°59′37″W

Information
- School district: Barbour County Schools
- NCES District ID: 5400030
- CEEB code: 491020
- NCES School ID: 540003000008
- Teaching staff: 40.60 (FTE)
- Grades: PK, 6 - 12th
- Enrollment: 589 (2023-2024)
- Student to teacher ratio: 14.51
- Colors: Columbia blue, white, and navy
- Nickname: Colts
- Website: pbhs.barb.k12.wv.us

Philip Barbour High School is the sole public high school serving Barbour County, West Virginia. The school is named, as is the county it serves, for Philip P. Barbour, a former Speaker of the United States House of Representatives and associate justice of the Supreme Court of the United States. Philip Barbour High School was the result of the consolidation of Philippi High School, Kasson High School and Belington High School in 1963.

The school colors are Columbia blue and white and the athletic nickname is the "Colts". The school is classified as a "AA" school by the WVSSAC for athletic purposes.

== Notable alumni ==
- Mary McClung, professor of theatrical costume design and puppetry at West Virginia University
