= Allen Walton =

- Born: August 24, 1835; Chester County, Pennsylvania
- Died: February 23, 1898 (aged 62); Jacksonville, Florida
- Known for: President of the Hummelstown Brownstone Company

Allen Walton (August 24, 1835 – February 23, 1898) was an American machinist and businessman who served as the president of both the Hummelstown Brownstone Company and the Brownstone-Middletown Railroad Company.

== Biography ==
Allen Walton was born in Chester County, Pennsylvania in 1835. His parents, both Quakers, moved to Philadelphia when he was one year old. Walton was educated in the Friends' School where he learned various machinist trades and worked for ten years as a plumber and with steam and gas fittings. In 1863, he secured a patent to aid in the mixing of gases.

In 1867, Walton's brother-in-law, Jacob Haehnlen, formed a partnership with other businessmen of Philadelphia to purchase control of a burgeoning brownstone quarry located in Hummelstown, Pennsylvania. The quarry, which had opened in the early 1700s, was recently exporting large amounts of stone to central Pennsylvania cities for use in construction. Walton was approached by Haehnlen to purchased four shares of the stock in the company, and together with three other individuals they formed the Pennsylvania Brown Free Stone Company.

After eighteen months as shareholder, the former superintendent resigned and Walton put in his bid to become the new superintendent. Walton had previously been informed by his doctor that, due to his poor health, he should move out of the city, so the timing was fortuitous. While in the midst of moving from Philadelphia to Hummelstown, Walton surveyed the brownstone quarries in Newark, New Jersey to learn more about the business. Walton was made superintendent of the quarry in 1867, and after seven years in this capacity bought it outright in 1875. With his purchase the next ten years saw rapid growth and the implementation of many more modern processes. In 1875, Walton added a four mile long railroad, chartered as the Brownstone-Middletown Railroad Company, which connected the quarry to the nearby Philadelphia and Reading Railroad. In 1891, Walton changed the name to the Hummelstown Brownstone Company and became its president. He became president of the railroad company the following year.

Towards the mid 1890s, Walton sold the ownership of the brownstone and railroad companies to both of his sons for the sum of $1. He stayed involved with the local community as he held a controlling interest in both the Hummelstown electric and water companies, and was elected vice-president of the Hummelstown national bank.

== Personal life ==
Walton married Emma J. Koehlenkamp in 1859 and together they had two sons, Allen K. and Robert J. Walton.

Walton died in Jacksonville, Florida in 1898 while on vacation. His sons both continued to control the brownstone company after their father's death.
