= Valley Furnace =

- U.S. National Register of Historic Places
- Location within West Virginia Location within the United States
- Location: Valley Furnace, West Virginia
- Coordinates: 39°11′46″N 79°52′03″W
- Area: 0.475 acres (0.192 ha)
- Built: 1847
- NRHP reference No.: 100009138
- Added to NRHP: July 21, 2023

Valley Furnace, also known as Fanny Furnace and Brushy Fork Furnace, is a historic blast furnace near Valley Furnace, West Virginia. The furnace operated from 1847 to about 1855, after which the site was abandoned. After 1965 the site became a roadside park operated by the West Virginia Division of Highways. In 2002 the property was transferred to the Barbour County Commission for use as a park. The site has not been developed for park use.

== Description ==
Valley Furnace comprises the remaining portions of an iron smelting operation. The existing furnace is a rough stone structure with sloping walls, originally between 32 feet (9.8 m) and 39 feet (12 m). Much of the upper part of the furnace structure has collapsed into rubble. The complex originally included timber structures to charge and serve the furnace which have since disappeared. There may also have been a water wheel on an adjoining stream to power a bellows. Records indicate that 20 to 30 houses were nearby, along with blacksmith shops, ore mines, and timber stands. None of these appurtenances remain. The entire property associated with the furnace may have amounted to 1,000 acres (400 ha), with about 13 acres (5.3 ha) devoted to the furnace complex.

== History ==
Iron ore was found at the location in 1835 by John Johnson, who sought investors to develop the deposit. The furnace was constructed circa 1847 by George W. Bryan, who named the furnace "fanny" for his wife. . Unlike earlier bloomery furnaces that produced wrought iron, the Valley Furnace was a blast furnace that produced pig iron using a bellows to induce a forced draft, using charcoal as a fuel. Ore was provided from surface mines that exploited local clay deposits bearing ore nodules. Although coal was available on the property, it was not used for fuel. The furnace produced about 9,000 pounds (4,100 kg) of iron a day. A steam-powered blast was installed instead of the water-powered blast around 1850.

George Bryan died in 1853 at the age of about 38 years. Disputes among creditors were not resolved until 1859, but the furnace appears to have remained in operation until 1855, and the site was abandoned. By the middle of the 19th century, coal-fire furnaces in Pennsylvania using iron ore from rich deposits in Michigan produced cheap iron, making operations like the Valley Smelter noncompetitive. In 1965 a roadside maker was installed, and a roadside park was constructed around 1971 by the West Virginia Division of Highways. Some reconstruction work was done in 1989. In December 2020, the land was transferred to the Barbour County Commission.

The site is an undeveloped Barbour County park, comprising about 0.437 acres (0.177 ha). The site was listed on the National Register of Historic Places on July 21, 2023.
