= The Barbour Democrat =

Newspaper in Philippi, West Virginia

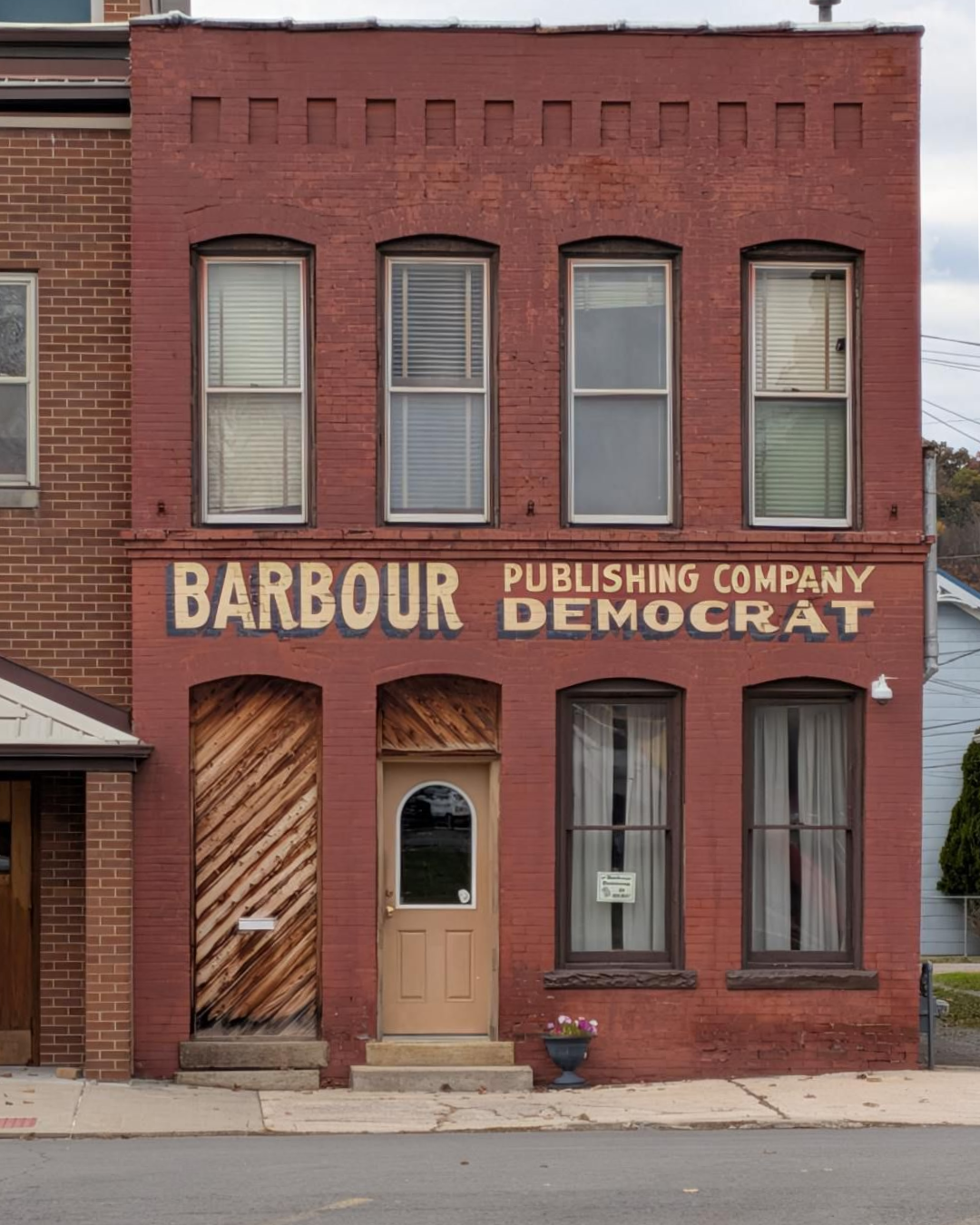
- The Barbour Democrat in 2025
- Type: Weekly newspaper
- Founder: Aldine S. Poling
- Founded: 6 July 1893
- Headquarters: Philippi, West Virginia
- Circulation: 5,301 (as of 2016)
- Website: barbourdemocratwv.com

The Barbour Democrat is a weekly newspaper published on Wednesdays in Philippi, West Virginia. It is the only newspaper published in Barbour County and has a paid circulation of 5,300, accounting for 31% of the county's population. It is a member of the West Virginia Press Association.

The Barbour Democrat has been published continuously since 6 July 1893, when it was founded by Aldine S. Poling. In the 1940s it absorbed a rival paper, The Philippi Republican. The paper was owned and operated by the Byrne family, but is now owned in its entirety by J. Eric Cutright; Lars Byrne is the editor and the only remaining Byrne family member still employed by The Barbour Democrat.

Coverage consists of serious news from the region, reported by staff, and social items contributed by readers. In addition to covering events in Philippi, Belington and Junior, the Democrat runs several regular columns reporting news from small rural communities in the county. Despite its name, the paper has long since abandoned political partisanship and does not publish editorials or endorse candidates.

In 2004, The Barbour Democrat received the Barbour County Chamber's Directors' Award 'for long and faithful dedication to the continuing prosperity of Barbour County and its citizens, wherever in the world they may now be living.' In 2005, the paper won the West Virginia Education Association's Golden Apple Award for continuous coverage of education issues.
