= Barbour County Schools =

School district in West Virginia, US

Location
- Philippi, West Virginia Barbour County, West Virginia United States

District information
- Type: Public School District
- Superintendent: Eddie Campbell
- NCES District ID: 5400030

Other information
- Website: www.bcswv.com

Barbour County Schools is the operating school district within Barbour County, West Virginia. Its main office is located in Philippi.

== Board of education ==
Barbour County Schools is run by the Barbour County Board of Education, consisting of the following elected members:

- Joanne McConnell, President
- David Everson, Vice President
- Jared Nestor
- Ron Phillips
- Adam Starks

== Schools ==
=== High schools ===
- Philip Barbour High School , Philippi

=== Middle schools ===
- Belington Middle School, Belington
- Philippi Middle School, Philippi

=== Elementary/Middle Schools ===
- Elementary/Middle School, Moatsville

=== Elementary schools ===
- Elementary School, Belington
- Junior Elementary School, Junior
- Philippi Elementary School, Philippi

=== Former Schools ===
- Belington High School
- Kasson High School
- Mt. Vernon Elementary School
- Phillipi High School
- Volga-Century Elementary School
