= Peck-Crim-Chesser House =

Historic house in West Virginia, United States

- U.S. National Register of Historic Places
- U.S. Historic district – Contributing property
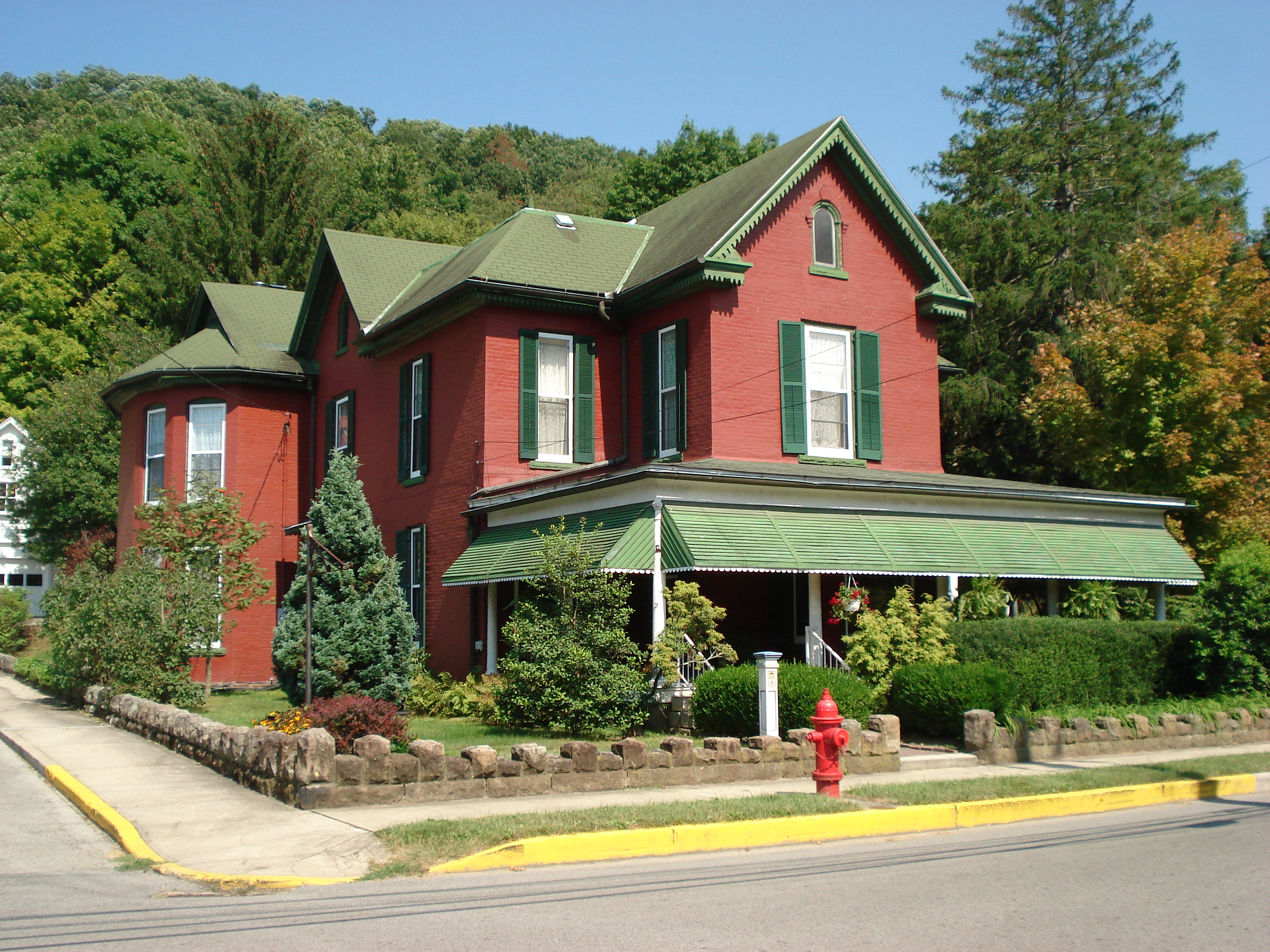

- Location within West Virginia Location within the United States
- Location: 14 N. Walnut St., Philippi, West Virginia
- Coordinates: 39°9′12″N 80°2′21″W
- Area: 0.5 acres (0.20 ha)
- Built: 1884
- Architectural style: Late Victorian
- Part of: Philippi Historic District (ID90001241)
- NRHP reference No.: 84003464

Significant dates
- Added to NRHP: August 23, 1984
- Designated CP: August 29, 1990

The Peck-Crim-Chesser House is a historic home located at Philippi, Barbour County, West Virginia, US. It was built in 1884, and is a large, two-story red brick house on a limestone foundation. It features highly pitched multiple gables and tall chimneys with corbeled caps. The house is a significant local example of Late Victorian architecture, and was for many years associated with descendants and members of the locally prominent Peck and Crim families.

== History ==
The house was designed and built by Cora May Crim Peck (1859-1948) and Melville Peck (1855-?), its first owners. Cora May was the daughter of prominent local businessman J.N.B. Crim. Peck was a prominent lawyer. Together they established the Tygarts Valley Star Weekly newspaper. Peck was elected mayor of Philippi twice. The Pecks moved to Richmond, Virginia in 1904. The house was purchased by Cora's brother, Edmund Hall Crim (1864-1920), a banker and businessman. Crim was robbed and murdered in New York City on a business trip, and his widow Virginia Talbott Crim, and their daughter Lucille Crim Chesser continued to live in the house. Lucille and her husband owned the house into the 1980s.

== Description ==
The house is one for the few substantial brick houses in Philippi. The two-story house has an irregular plan with steeply pitched roofs and gables. Windows have stone sills matching the limestone foundation. The front of the house features a wide porch with Tuscan columns that extends part of the way down both side elevations. There is another porch at the rear.

The stair hall is open to the second floor. Its stairway features highly detailed wood trim and wainscoting. The interior retains an extensive amount of carpentry finishes in nearly original form, including open wood screens with turned spindles, pocketed doors, and library shelving.

The house was listed on the National Register of Historic Places in 1984. It is a contributing structure in the Philippi Historic District.

== See also ==
- National Register of Historic Places listings in Barbour County, West Virginia
- J. N. B. Crim House
