= West Virginia Route 57 =

State highway in West Virginia, United States

West Virginia Route 57

Route information
- Maintained by WVDOH
- Length: 11.8 mi (19.0 km)

Major junctions
- West end: WV 20 near Romines Mills
- East end: US 119 near Philippi

Location
- Country: United States
- State: West Virginia
- Counties: Harrison, Barbour

Highway system
- West Virginia State Highway System; Interstate; US; State
← WV 55	→ WV 58

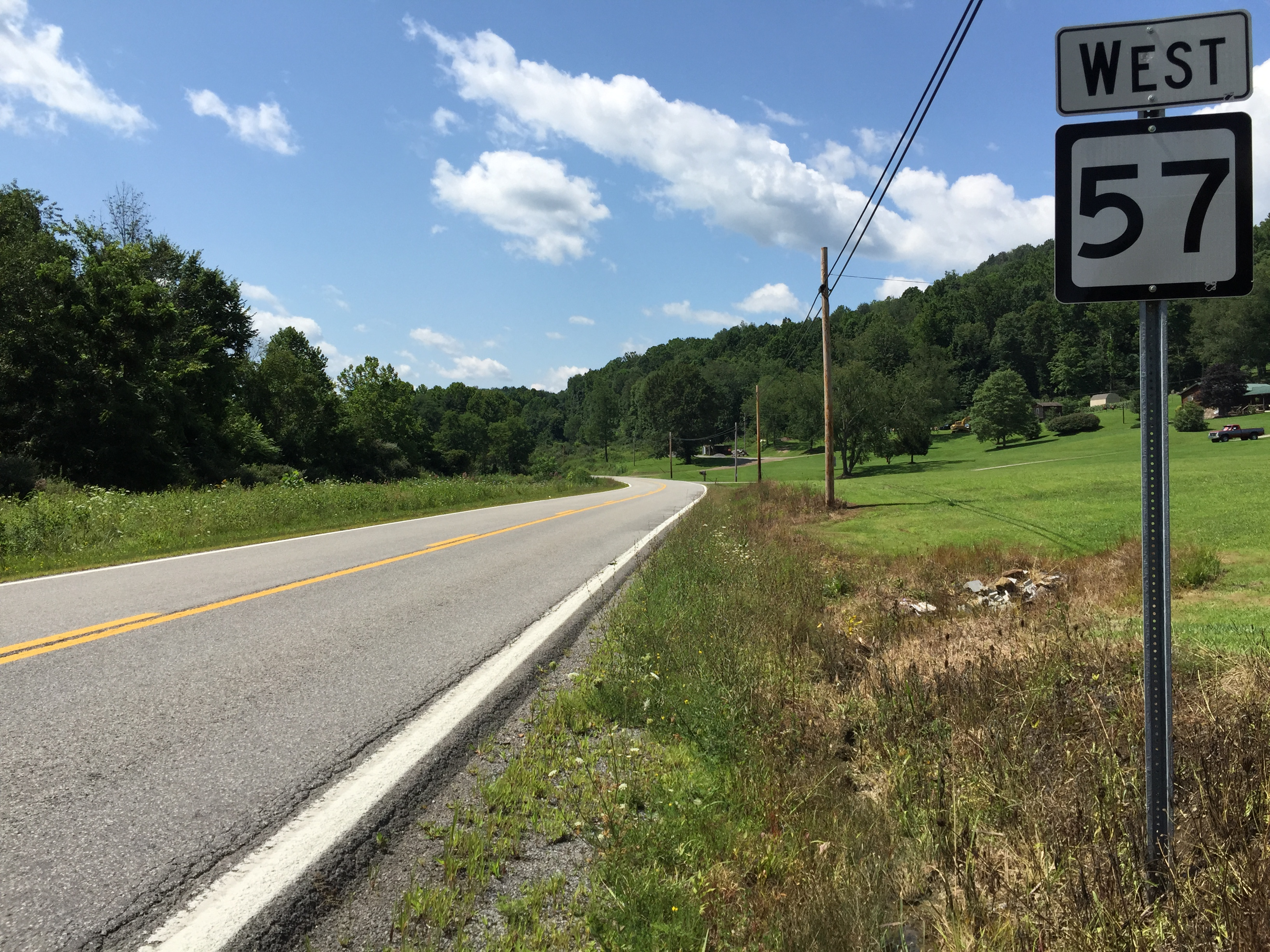
View west along WV 57 at CR 57/5 in Overfield

West Virginia Route 57 is an east–west state highway in northern West Virginia. The western terminus of the route is at West Virginia Route 20 a half-mile north of Romines Mills and eight miles (13 km) southeast of Clarksburg. The eastern terminus is at U.S. Route 119 southwest of Philippi.

The road acts as an ideal connector road between Philippi and Clarksburg as the road has few sharp curves and, as a state route, is better maintained than other area roads. The speed limit for the road's entire 12-mile (19 km) duration is 55 miles per hour.

== Major intersections ==
County	Location	mi	km	Destinations	Notes
Harrison				WV 20 – Buckhannon, Clarksburg	
Barbour				US 119 – Philippi, Buckhannon	
1.000 mi = 1.609 km; 1.000 km = 0.621 mi
