= Barbour County Courthouse =

- U.S. National Register of Historic Places
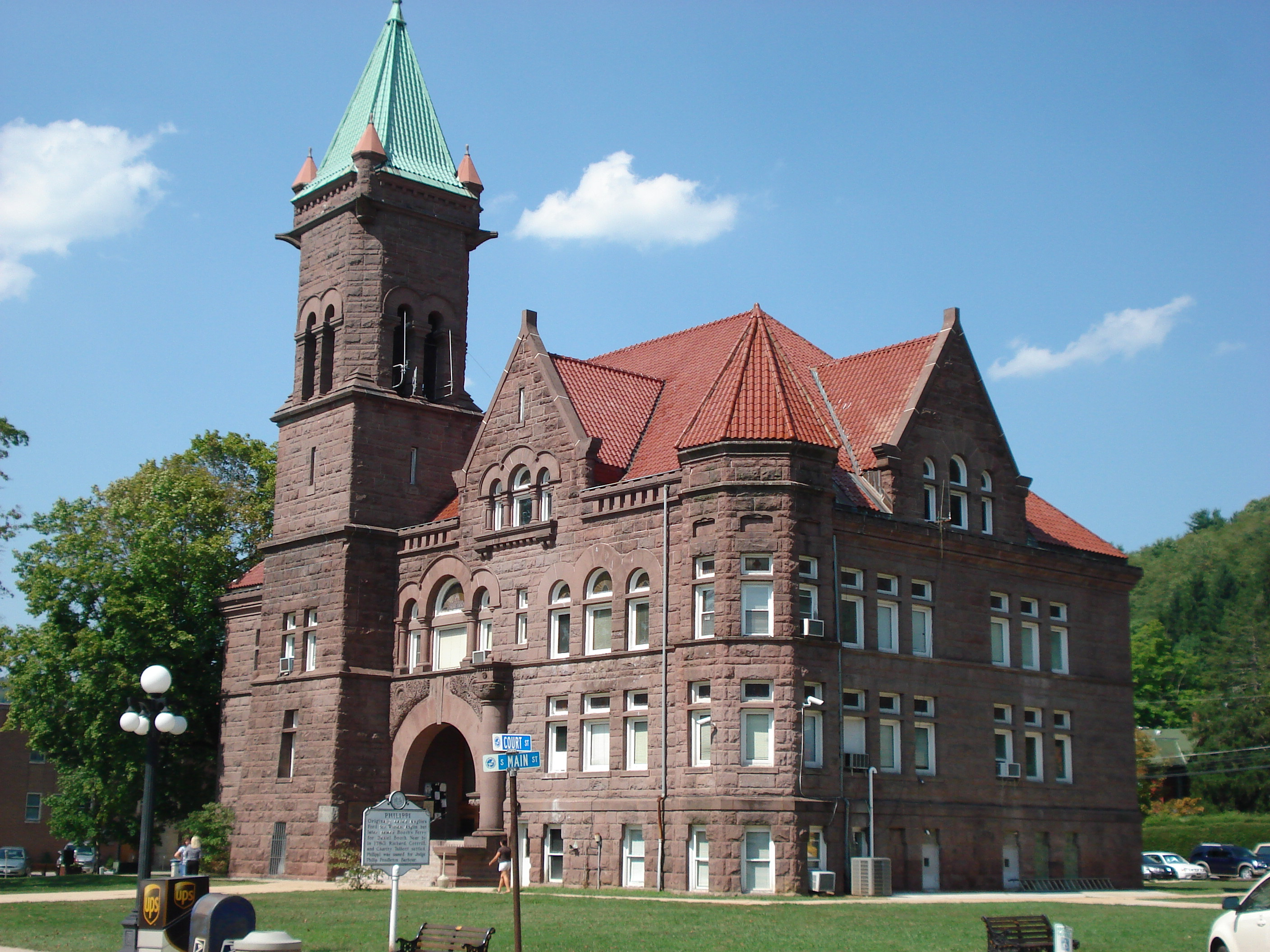
- Barbour County Courthouse

- Location within West Virginia Location within the United States
- Interactive map showing the location of Barbour County Courthouse
- Nearest city: Philippi, West Virginia
- Coordinates: 39°9′9″N 80°2′21″W
- Built: 1903-05
- Architect: J. Charles Fulton and J.P. Conn
- Architectural style: Richardsonian Romanesque; Romanesque Revival
- NRHP reference No.: 80004014
- Added to NRHP: 1980

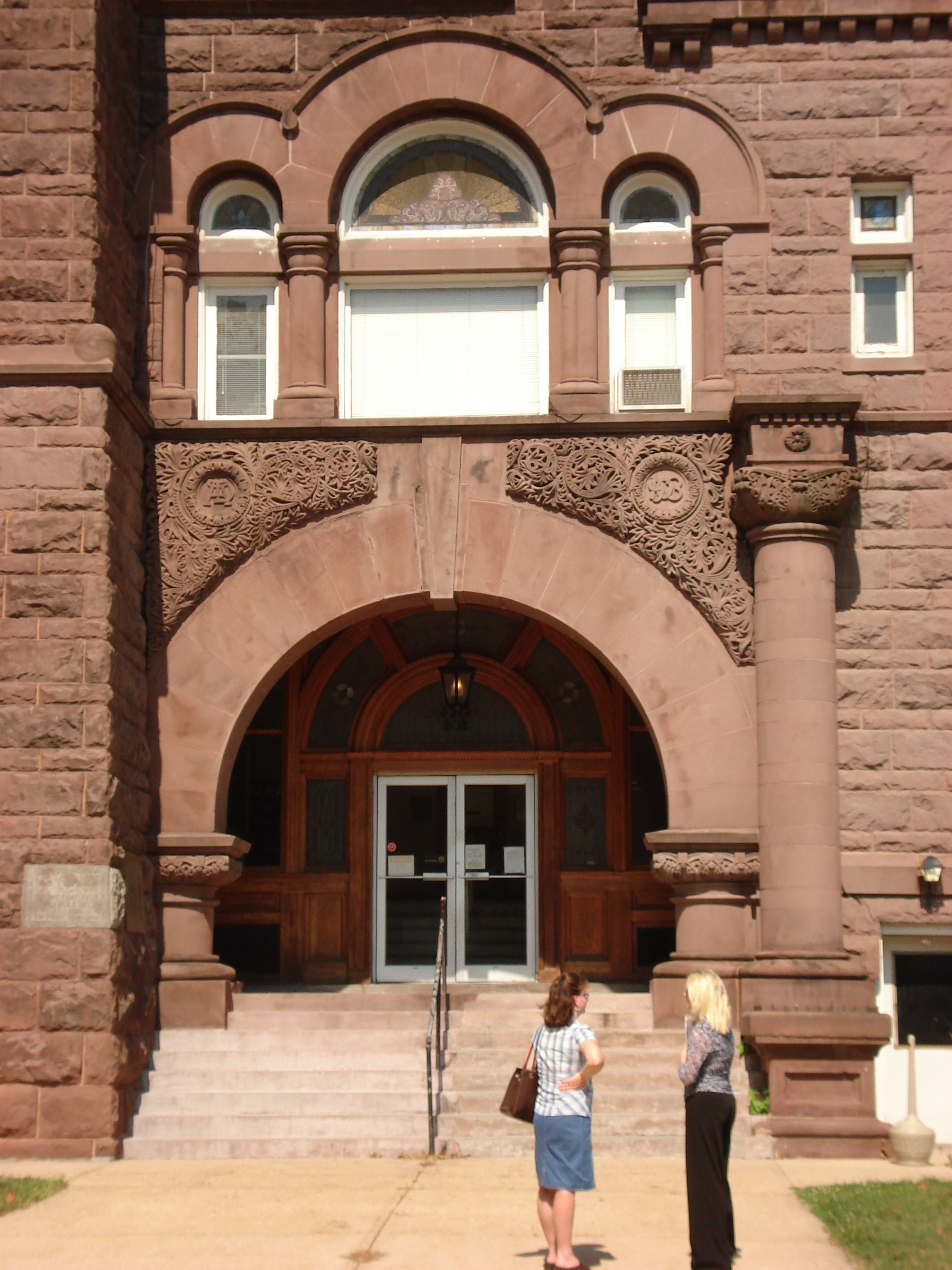
Main portal of the Barbour County Courthouse

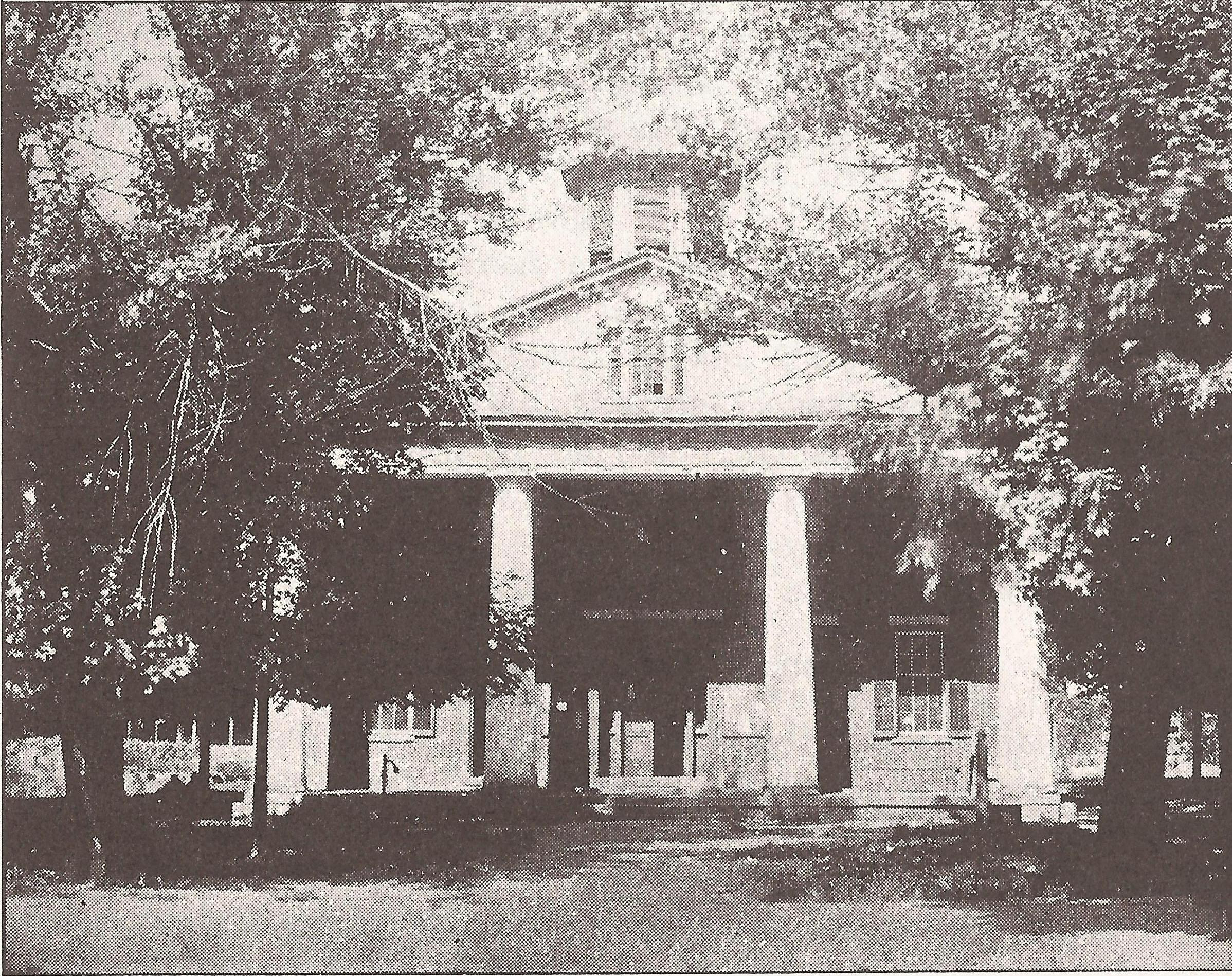
The Old Barbour County Courthouse (1844-46) was on the same site as its successor. (Photo ca 1890.)

The Barbour County Courthouse in Philippi, Barbour County, West Virginia, USA is a monumental public building constructed between 1903 and 1905 in the Richardsonian Romanesque style. It dominates the town center and is the county's chief symbol of government. It was added to the National Register of Historic Places in 1980.

== History ==
=== Original courthouse ===
The original Barbour County Courthouse was a large brick building with a white painted wood-frame Greek Revival portico. It was built between 1844 and '46. From its octagonal cupola, in 1861, floated the first Confederate flag in what would become the state of West Virginia. Later, the building was used to house Union troops during the American Civil War. The dilapidated cupola was removed in 1893 and placed on the nearby barn owned by lawyer C.F. Teter.

=== Present courthouse ===
J. Charles Fulton of Uniontown, Pennsylvania was contracted in 1901 and designed the present courthouse building in the Richardsonian Romanesque (Romanesque Revival) style. It was constructed by contractor J.P. Conn during 1903–1905.

The 1905 structure was listed in the National Register of Historic Places in 1980. A restoration effort began in 1995 and included repair and replacement of the original stained glass interior dome. This project was named "Best Interior Rehabilitation Project" in 1999 by the Main Street Project of the West Virginia Development Office.

== Description ==
The Barbour County Courthouse is situated in Court Square, facing Main Street, in Philippi. Its plan is a modified rectangle of solid masonry about 95 feet across the front elevation and 60 feet across the sides.

=== Exterior ===
The exterior of the building is constructed of Hummelstown brownstone, a high-quality, medium-grain, dense sandstone quarried near Hummelstown in Dauphin County, Pennsylvania. At the time, the stone would have traveled to West Virginia via the Brownstone to Middletown Railroad and the Middletown and Hummelstown Railroad. This stone is dark brown with reddish to purplish hues. The entirety of the exterior ashlar stonework is rusticated with the exception of the smooth voussoirs defining the arcuated portal and window openings and the stringcourses and window sills. The overall impression created is one of mass and dignity.

The 2 ½ story structure rests on a raised basement and is dominated by a colossal offset tower to the left of the massive main entrance portal and by smaller, secondary prominences such as steeply pitched wall dormers and an octagonal turret on the corner to the right of the main portal. This massive portal is flanked on its left by a large smooth shaft column with Byzantine capital; the place of its mate on the opposite side is occupied by the heavy main tower. The spandrels of the portal arch are decorated with a delicate, foliate relief pattern.

The massive, square tower, which looms asymmetrically to the left of the main portal, encompasses four stories, each delineated by smooth stone stringcourses. Its open belfry, with double, arched openings on each of the four sides, is crowned by a pyramidal roof whose four chamfered corners each terminate at the cornice level in a small spire. A stringcourse just below the cornice carries (just above the chamfered corners of the belfry superstructure) four gargoyle-like, projecting blocks of stone, which may be sculptor's blocks left unfinished.

The arched, tripartite window immediately above the main portal is echoed by similar window treatments in the wall dormers and another just to its left. The main window above the portal and the one in the front elevation dormer are adorned with smooth shaft colonnettes. These arched windows, as well as the building's other, flat-headed window openings (also arranged in threes) are embellished with stained-glass transoms and smooth transom bars.

== Aesthetic merit ==
An authority on the Hummelstown Brownstone Company, which supplied the stone of which the courthouse is constructed, has said:

As impressive as many of the buildings trimmed in [Hummelstown] brownstone are, nothing can match the magnificence of those structures built primarily of brownstone. Perhaps the most impressive extant public building built entirely of Hummelstown brownstone is the Barbour County Courthouse in Philippi, West Virginia ... Erected in 1903, it remains a testament to the finest expectations that the public at large at the turn of the century wanted to see in their municipal architecture. Crowned with a tile roof, the alternating narrow and wide bands of rock face masonry contrast with the smooth finish of the arch and its Rococo embellishment.

== See also ==
- National Register of Historic Places listings in West Virginia
- National Register of Historic Places listings in Barbour County, West Virginia
