= Romines Mills, West Virginia =

Unincorporated community in West Virginia, US

Coordinates: 39°10′11″N 80°15′51″W

Romines Mills is an unincorporated community in Harrison County, in the U.S. state of West Virginia.

== History ==
A post office called Romines Mills was established in 1833, and remained in operation until 1907. The post office most likely was named after the local Romine family.
