= Valley Furnace, West Virginia =

Valley Furnace
- Unincorporated community
- Location within the state of West Virginia Valley Furnace (the United States)
- Coordinates: 39°11′42″N 80°52′36″W
- Country: United States
- State: West Virginia
- County: Barbour
- Elevation: 1,467 ft (447 m)
- Time zone: UTC-5 (Eastern (EST))
  - Summer (DST): UTC-4 (EDT)
- GNIS ID: 1555868

Valley Furnace is an unincorporated community in Barbour County, West Virginia, United States.

The community was named for a blast furnace near the original town site.
