= Philippi station =

- Philippi B & O Railroad Station
- U.S. National Register of Historic Places
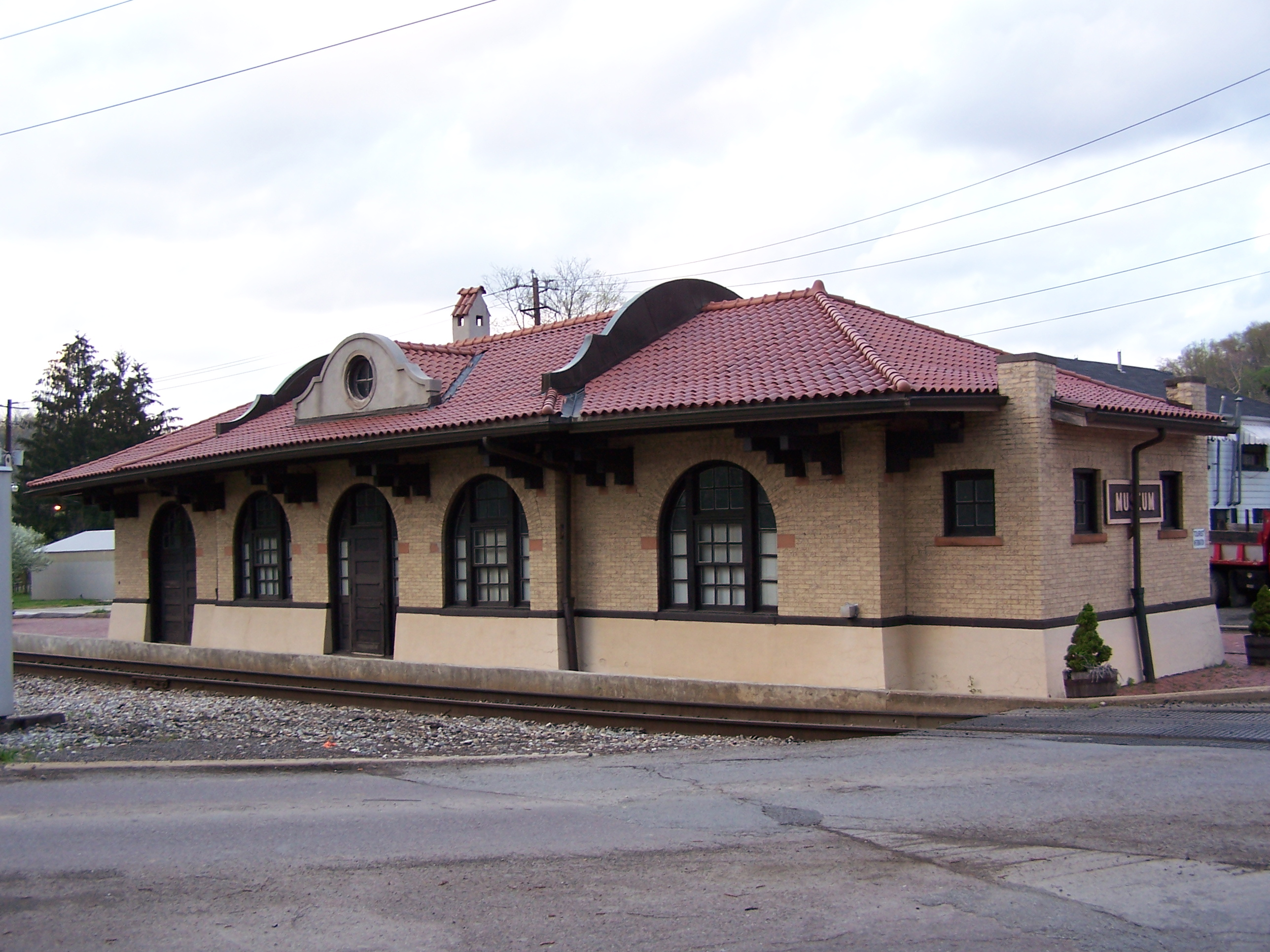

- Location within West Virginia Location within the United States
- Location: 146 N. Main St., Philippi, West Virginia
- Coordinates: 39°9′12″N 80°2′35″W
- Built: 1911
- Architectural style: Mission/Spanish Revival
- NRHP reference No.: 86001082
- Added to NRHP: May 16, 1986

The Philippi station is a historic train station in Philippi, West Virginia, United States. Built in 1911, the Mission style building is an unusual representative of that style in the state. After passenger service to Philippi ceased in 1956, the building was used by the Baltimore and Ohio Railroad as a workshop. The station was purchased by the city in 1979 and was restored as the Barbour County Historical Museum. It was listed on the National Register of Historic Places in 1986.

Preceding station	Baltimore and Ohio Railroad	Following station
Lillian toward Charleston	Charleston – Grafton	Meriden toward Grafton
