= Philippi, West Virginia =

City in West Virginia, US

- City
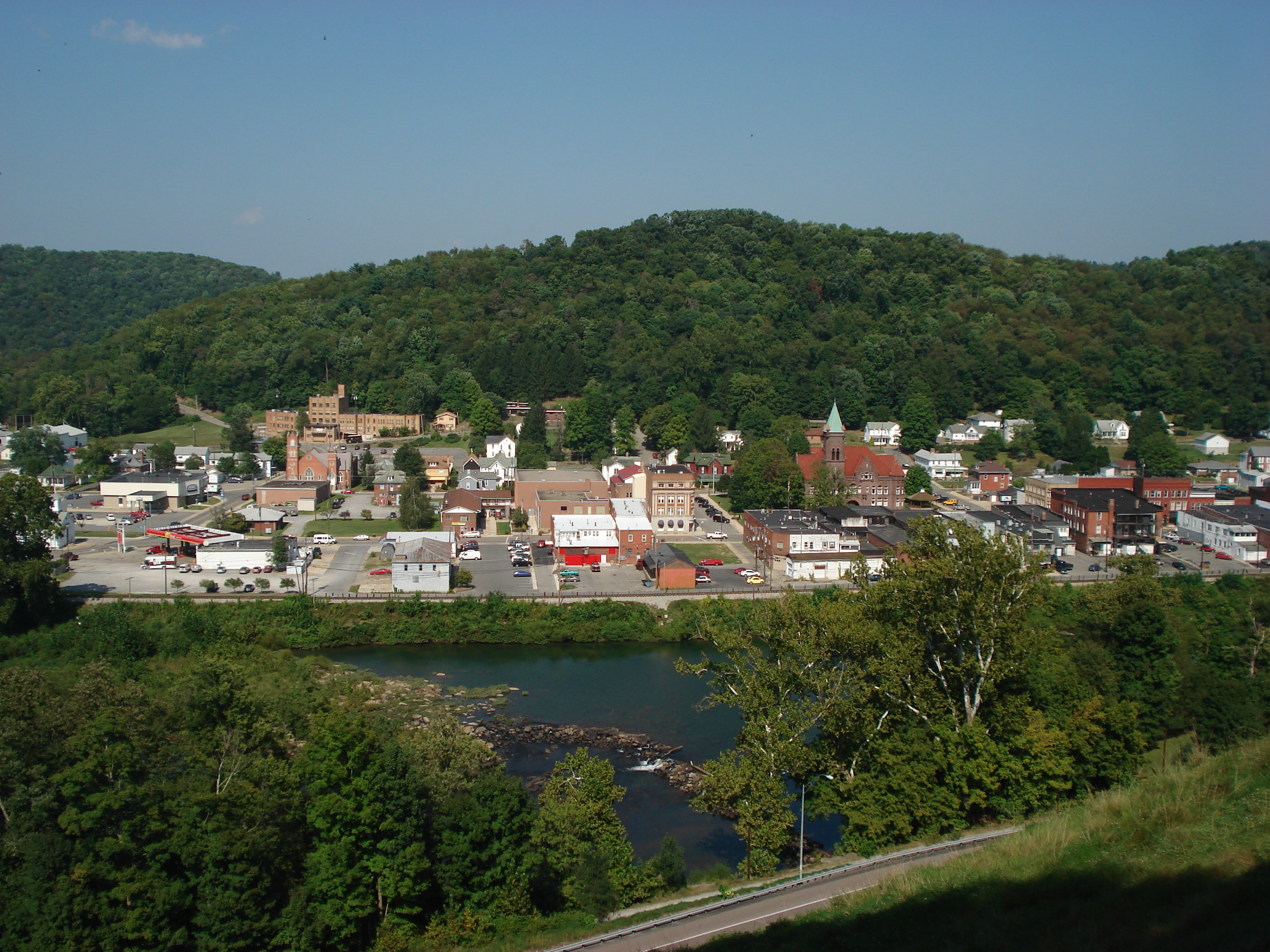
- The Philippi Historic District with the Barbour County Courthouse seen from across the Tygart Valley River in 2007

- Seal Logo
- Interactive map of Philippi, West Virginia
- Location within West Virginia Location within the United States
- Coordinates: 39°9′6″N 80°2′36″W
- Country: United States
- State: West Virginia
- County: Barbour
- District: Philippi

Area
  - Total: 2.92 sq mi (7.57 km^{2})
  - Land: 2.83 sq mi (7.33 km^{2})
  - Water: 0.093 sq mi (0.24 km^{2})
- Elevation: 1,302 ft (397 m)

Population (2020)
  - Total: 2,929
  - Estimate (2021): 2,922
  - Density: 1,150.9/sq mi (444.35/km^{2})
- Time zone: UTC-5 (Eastern (EST))
  - Summer (DST): UTC-4 (EDT)
- ZIP code: 26416
- Area codes: 304/681
- FIPS code: 54-63292
- GNIS feature ID: 1544780
- Website: www.philippi.org

Philippi ('FILL-uh-pea') is a city in and the county seat of Barbour County, West Virginia, United States, along the Tygart Valley River. The population was 2,929 at the 2020 census. In 1861, it was the site of the Battle of Philippi, known as the "Philippi Races". Although a minor skirmish, this is considered the earliest notable land action of the American Civil War. The city has a weekly newspaper, The Barbour Democrat.

== History ==
=== Settlement ===
The first white settlement in present-day Barbour County was established approximately three miles downriver from the future site of Philippi in 1780, at which time the area was still part of western Virginia and included within Monongalia County. The earliest settlers on the section of bottomland that would one day become Philippi were William Anglin (as early as 1783 or '84) and Daniel Booth (1787). A ford existed here as early as 1789 which served the road that had recently been surveyed between Beverly and Sandy Creek. Anglin was the original owner of the land upon which Philippi stands, hence the earliest known name for the locality — Anglin's Ford. Booth also owned and operated a commercial ferry here in the 1790s, thus the area's second popular designation — Booth's Ferry. William Friend Wilson married Booth's daughter and built a wool and grain mill on the river in 1818.

In 1825, the first post office in the region (that would later become Barbour County) was established by Henson Lewis Hoff (1805-1890), an expeditious young man who had just arrived from Loudoun County. Hoff settled at Cherry Hill, just west of the current city limits of Philippi. After Hoff became the postmaster, the community that would become Philippi was known as "Hoffsville" and remained so until 1841 when the name "Philippa" was first considered.

=== Founding and naming ===
In March 1843, the vast Harrison and Randolph Counties of western Virginia were carved up into several smaller political units, among them Barbour County, which included Hoffsville. In 1899, Hu Maxwell described the April 1843 founding and official naming of the new county seat:

"The county seat of Barbour was located at the place where Philippi now stands before there was a town and before the place was named. It was then a farm belonging to William F. Wilson, and the locality had long been known as Booth's Ferry. The land was first the property of William Anglin, and in succession was owned by John Wilson, Daniel Booth, Ely Butcher, Elmore Hart, Thomas H. Hite and William F. Wilson, who divided it into lots and disposed of the most of it within a few years of the establishing of the county seat. The county was named after [the Virginia lawyer and jurist] Philip P. Barbour, and it was the intention of the county court when it selected a name for the town to honor the given name of Mr. Barbour; giving it the feminine form, however, in conformity with the Latin language. The feminine of Philip is Philippa, and it was meant that such should be the name of the town. But because of misspellings and a misunderstanding of the origin of the name (confounding it with Philippi, an ancient city) the name finally took the form which it now has. On April 5, 1843, the third day of the first county court, it is 'ordered that the county seat of this county be known and called PHILLIPPA'. Except that the name has too many 'l's' the form was proper, according to what was originally intended. Later the name became Philippi, but even then it was oftener misspelled than spelled correctly."

As Maxwell implies, St Paul's Epistle to the Philippians and the ancient Battle of Philippi were no doubt influential in the final form of the name. Philippi was established by charter in 1844.

In 1852 Lemuel Chenoweth, an Appalachian architect and carpenter, built a covered bridge in Philippi to provide a link on the turnpike running between Beverly and Fairmont. The Philippi Covered Bridge spelled the end of the commercial ferry operation and is still the town's prominent landmark.

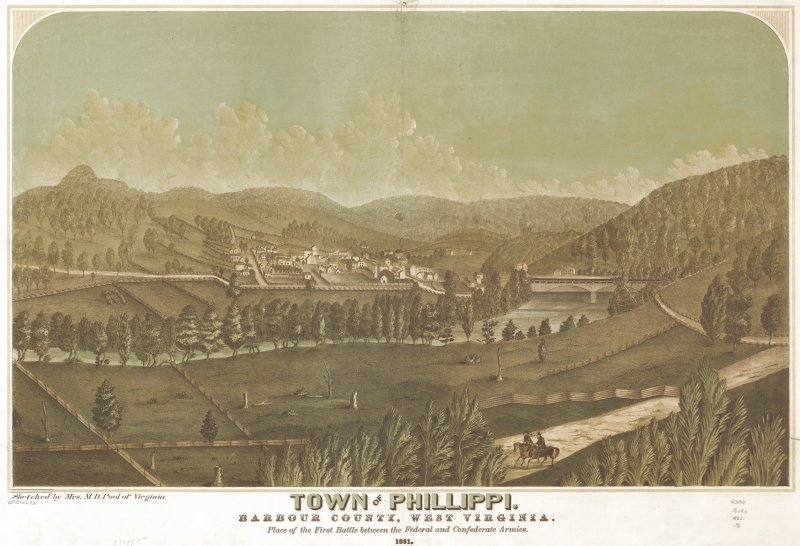
Town of Phillippi (1861)

=== Civil War ===
Philippi was the scene of the first land battle of the American Civil War, on June 3, 1861. The battle was promptly lampooned as the "Philippi Races" because of the hurried retreat by the Confederate troops encamped in the town. (The battle is reenacted every June during the town's 'Blue and Gray Reunion.')

At daylight on June 3, two columns of Union forces under the command of Col. Benjamin Franklin Kelley and Col. Ebenezer Dumont, with perhaps 3,000 men, arrived from Grafton and attacked about 800 poorly armed Confederate recruits under the command of Col. George A. Porterfield. The Union troops had marched all night through a heavy rain storm to arrive just before daylight. The surprise attack — from the heights of "Battle Hill" to the northwest — awakened the sleeping Confederates. After firing a few shots at the advancing Union troops, the Southerners broke lines and began running frantically to the south, some still in their bed clothes.

The Union victory in a relatively bloodless battle propelled the young Major General George B. McClellan into the national spotlight, and he was soon given command of all Union armies. The battle also inspired more vocal protests in the Western part of Virginia against secession. A few days later in Wheeling, the Wheeling Convention nullified the Virginia ordinance of secession and named Francis H. Pierpont governor. These events eventually resulted in the separate statehood of West Virginia.

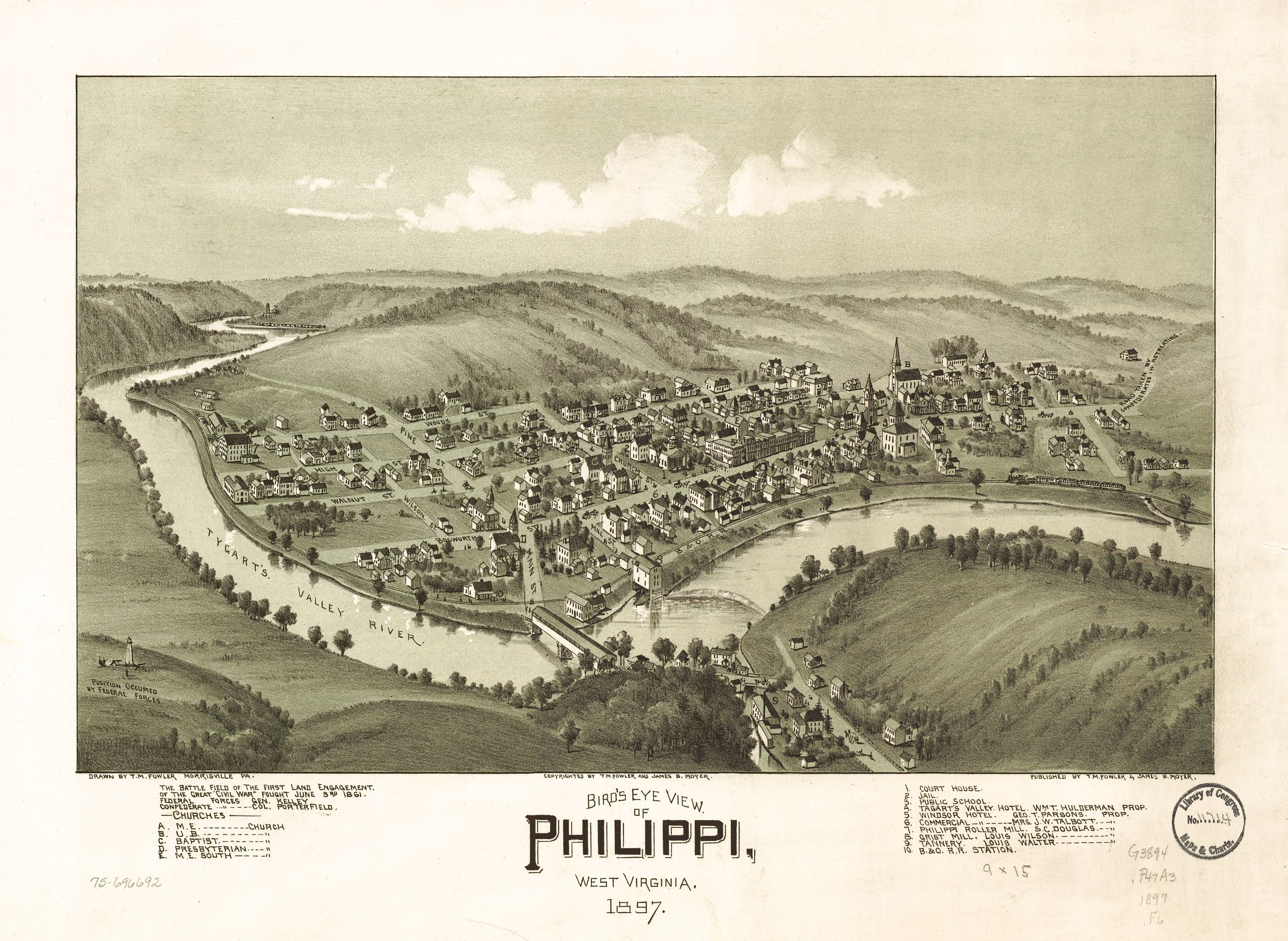
Bird's Eye View of Philippi, West Virginia, 1897

=== Later history ===
Philippi was incorporated by act of the West Virginia Legislature on 1 February 1871. The first railroad – the Grafton and Greenbrier, a narrow-gauge – arrived at Philippi on 25 January 1884. Three years later the line was extended to Belington and in 1891 it became a standard gauge when it was acquired by the B&O. In 1904, citizens passed a bond issue permitting the city to begin generating electricity for the first time by gas.

In 1901, Broaddus College (founded in 1871 in Winchester, Virginia and later located in Clarksburg, West Virginia) relocated to "Battle Hill", overlooking Philippi. In 1932, Broaddus merged with Alderson Academy (itself founded in 1901 in Alderson, West Virginia), whereupon these two Baptist institutions became Alderson–Broaddus College. (The institution changed its name to "Alderson Broaddus University" in 2013, but became defunct in 2023.)

In 1905 a new Barbour County Courthouse was completed. It was designed by J. Charles Fulton in a monumental Romanesque Revival style. The building contractor was J.P. Conn.

Rail activity at Philippi peaked in the 1920s when as many as six passenger trains, along with mail and freight, transited the town daily. The automobile brought about a decline in the local railroad service, however, and the final passenger train made its last stop in Philippi in 1956.

Throughout its history, Philippi has suffered from floods because of its proximity to the river and the relatively low elevation of most of the town. The most damaging of these came in November 1985. The town has since adopted a flood plain management plan.

On July 31, 2023, the West Virginia Higher Education Policy Commission revoked Alderson Broaddus University's ability to confer degrees after the end of the year, and ordered to it cease admitting students, due to its "rapidly deteriorating financial condition". On the same day, the university's board of trustees voted to close the university.

== Geography ==
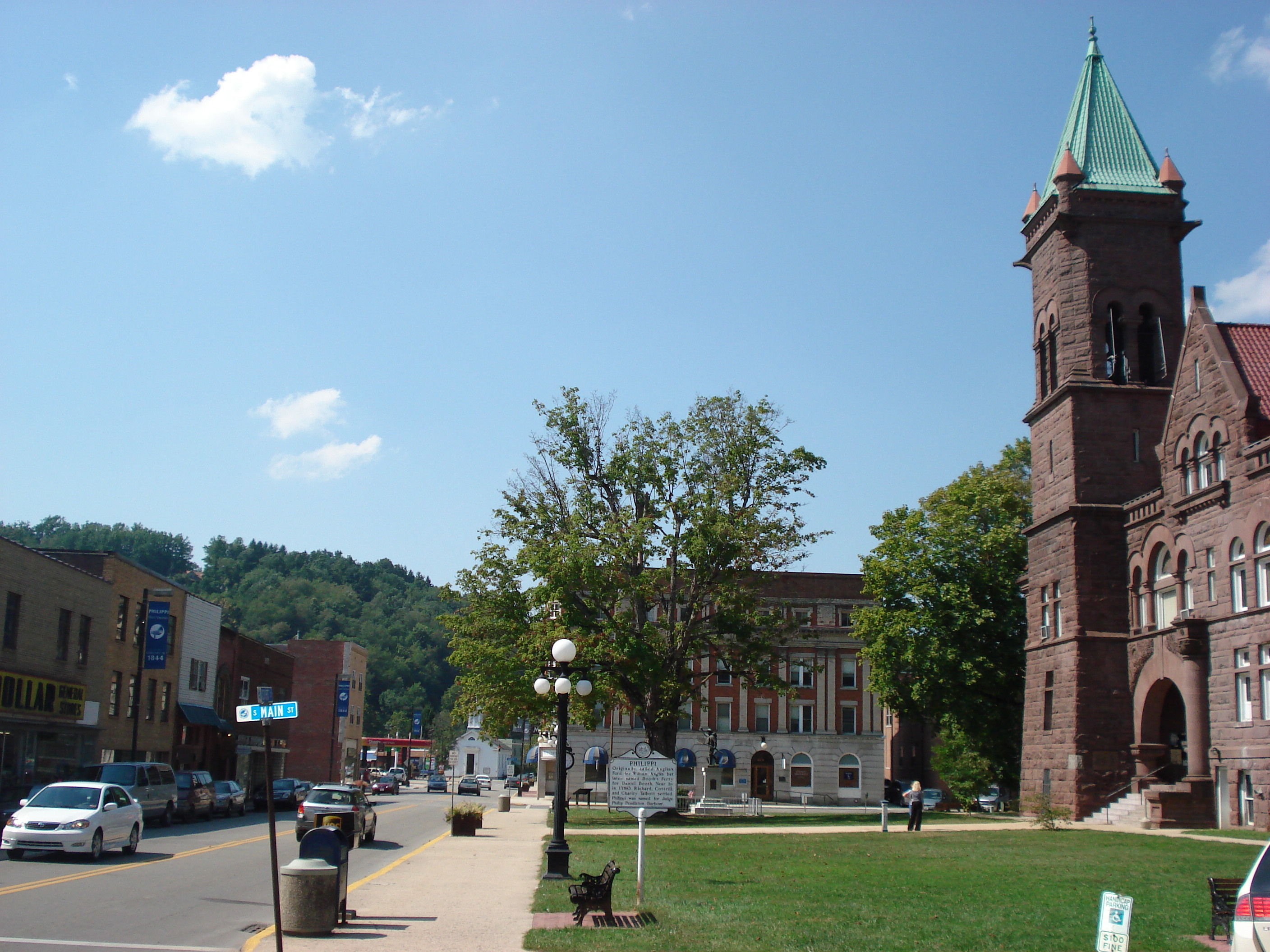
Court Square in Philippi looking northwest along Main Street (U.S. Route 250). The Barbour County Courthouse is at right.

Philippi is situated along the Tygart Valley River at 39°9′6″N 80°2′36″W (39.151569, -80.043472). It is within Philippi District — one of eight magisterial districts of Barbour County. The town is sub-divided into Wards 1 through 4.

According to the United States Census Bureau, the city has a total area of 2.95 square miles (7.64 km^{2}), of which 2.86 square miles (7.41 km^{2}) is land and 0.09 square miles (0.23 km^{2}) is water.

The original settlement that became the town of Philippi was on a section of bottomland at a bend in the river at the mouth of Anglin's Run. This area was later designated "Dayton Park". Opposite this bottomland, at the western landing of "Booth's Ferry", is a sharp ridge which breaks abruptly down to the river and is still known as "Nobusiness Hill". Most of the town is in the bottomland, but a portion, including the former college campus, is on another ridge — "Battle Hill", also called "Talbott's Hill" — overlooking the valley from the northwest. To the south, a third landmark hill — "Grabanickel Hill" — completes the ring of high ground encircling the town.

A railroad line runs through Philippi, now used only by freight trains, passenger rail service having been discontinued in 1956. The historic 1911 passenger station has served as the Barbour County Historical Museum since the station's restoration in 1979. The town is served by the small, private Philippi-Barbour County Regional Airport.

=== Climate ===
The climate in this area is characterized by hot humid summers and generally mild to cool winters. According to the Köppen Climate Classification system, Philippi has a humid subtropical climate, abbreviated "Cfa" on climate maps.

Climate data for Philippi, West Virginia
Month	Jan	Feb	Mar	Apr	May	Jun	Jul	Aug	Sep	Oct	Nov	Dec	Year
Mean maximum °F (°C)	67 (19)	66 (19)	76 (24)	84 (29)	85 (29)	90 (32)	89 (32)	91 (33)	88 (31)	80 (27)	76 (24)	69 (21)	91 (33)
Mean daily maximum °F (°C)	40.6 (4.8)	43.2 (6.2)	53.5 (11.9)	66.0 (18.9)	72.3 (22.4)	80.6 (27.0)	82.6 (28.1)	82.9 (28.3)	77.3 (25.2)	65.8 (18.8)	56.2 (13.4)	44.3 (6.8)	63.8 (17.7)
Daily mean °F (°C)	30.8 (−0.7)	32.6 (0.3)	41.5 (5.3)	52.9 (11.6)	60.0 (15.6)	69.1 (20.6)	72.0 (22.2)	72.0 (22.2)	65.5 (18.6)	53.6 (12.0)	44.5 (6.9)	34.4 (1.3)	52.4 (11.3)
Mean daily minimum °F (°C)	20.9 (−6.2)	22.0 (−5.6)	29.4 (−1.4)	39.7 (4.3)	47.7 (8.7)	57.5 (14.2)	61.5 (16.4)	61.1 (16.2)	53.6 (12.0)	41.5 (5.3)	32.8 (0.4)	24.5 (−4.2)	41.0 (5.0)
Mean minimum °F (°C)	1 (−17)	5 (−15)	14 (−10)	26 (−3)	35 (2)	47 (8)	50 (10)	52 (11)	41 (5)	30 (−1)	21 (−6)	8 (−13)	1 (−17)
Average precipitation inches (mm)	3.74 (95)	3.39 (86)	4.49 (114)	3.92 (100)	4.91 (125)	4.94 (125)	5.18 (132)	3.77 (96)	3.75 (95)	3.26 (83)	4.24 (108)	3.62 (92)	49.21 (1,251)
Average snowfall inches (cm)	16.2 (41)	10.1 (26)	7.3 (19)	1.1 (2.8)	trace	0.0 (0.0)	0.0 (0.0)	0.0 (0.0)	0.0 (0.0)	0.2 (0.51)	2.3 (5.8)	8.2 (21)	45.4 (116.11)
Average extreme snow depth inches (cm)	7 (18)	5 (13)	4 (10)	1 (2.5)	0 (0)	0 (0)	0 (0)	0 (0)	0 (0)	0 (0)	1 (2.5)	4 (10)	7 (18)
Average precipitation days (≥ 0.01 inches)	17	13	14	14	14	13	12	11	11	11	13	16	159
Average relative humidity (%)	84	84	80	78	79	77	78	77	78	79	77	82	79
Mean monthly sunshine hours	105.4	115.8	176.7	240	272.8	291	303.8	313.1	264	173.6	156	124	2,536.2
Mean daily sunshine hours	3.4	4.1	5.7	8	8.8	9.7	9.8	10.1	8.8	5.6	5.2	4	6.9
Average ultraviolet index	2	2	3	4	5	5	6	5	4	3	2	2	4
Source 1: National Weather Service(1981-2010, Temperatures 1999-2009)
Source 2: Weather Atlas(Humidity-Sunshine-UV)

== Demographics ==
Historical population
Census	Pop.	Note	%±
1890	378		—
1900	665		75.9%
1910	1,038		56.1%
1920	1,543		48.7%
1930	1,767		14.5%
1940	1,955		10.6%
1950	2,531		29.5%
1960	2,228		−12.0%
1970	3,002		34.7%
1980	3,194		6.4%
1990	3,132		−1.9%
2000	2,870		−8.4%
2010	2,966		3.3%
2020	2,929		−1.2%
2021 (est.)	2,922		−0.2%
U.S. Decennial Census

=== 2020 census ===
As of the 2020 census, Philippi had a population of 2,929. The median age was 31.1 years. 15.7% of residents were under the age of 18 and 18.3% of residents were 65 years of age or older. For every 100 females there were 99.7 males, and for every 100 females age 18 and over there were 98.9 males age 18 and over.

0.0% of residents lived in urban areas, while 100.0% lived in rural areas.

There were 1,081 households in Philippi, of which 23.2% had children under the age of 18 living in them. Of all households, 34.9% were married-couple households, 21.7% were households with a male householder and no spouse or partner present, and 36.1% were households with a female householder and no spouse or partner present. About 41.4% of all households were made up of individuals and 18.0% had someone living alone who was 65 years of age or older.

There were 1,253 housing units, of which 13.7% were vacant. The homeowner vacancy rate was 4.6% and the rental vacancy rate was 7.9%.

Racial composition as of the 2020 census
Race	Number	Percent
White	2,478	84.6%
Black or African American	236	8.1%
American Indian and Alaska Native	6	0.2%
Asian	21	0.7%
Native Hawaiian and Other Pacific Islander	0	0.0%
Some other race	32	1.1%
Two or more races	156	5.3%
Hispanic or Latino (of any race)	105	3.6%

=== 2010 census ===
As of the census of 2010, there were 2,966 people, 1,185 households, and 686 families residing in the city. The population density was 1,037.1 inhabitants per square mile (400.4/km^{2}). There were 1,383 housing units at an average density of 483.6 per square mile (186.7/km^{2}). The racial makeup of the city was 92.7% White, 2.3% African American, 1.1% Native American, 0.9% Asian, 0.2% from other races, and 2.9% from two or more races. Hispanics or Latinos of any race were 0.7% of the population.

There were 1,185 households, of which 26.0% had children under the age of 18 living with them, 38.6% were married couples living together, 14.5% had a female householder with no spouse present, 4.8% had a male householder with no spouse present, and 42.1% were non-families. 36.3% of all households were made up of individuals, and 15% had someone living alone who was 65 years of age or older. The average household size was 2.16 and the average family size was 2.78.

The median age in the city was 36.4 years. 17.8% of residents were under the age of 18; 20.9% were between the ages of 18 and 24; 20.5% were from 25 to 44; 23.8% were from 45 to 64; and 17.1% were 65 years of age or older. The gender makeup of the city was 45.3% male and 54.7% female.

=== 2000 census ===
As of the census of 2000, there were 2,870 people, 1,119 households, and 668 families residing in the city. The population density was 1,010.6 people per square mile (390.2/km^{2}). There were 1,260 housing units at an average density of 443.7 per square mile (171.3/km^{2}).

The racial makeup of the city was 94.77% White, 1.11% African American, 1.05% Native American, 0.87% Asian, 0.03% Pacific Islander, 0.42% from other races, and 1.74% from two or more races. Hispanics or Latinos of any race were 0.80% of the population. In addition, the area has a significant population of racially mixed (though often light-skinned and blue-eyed) people, known locally as 'the Chestnut Ridge people', whose specific origins are uncertain. They are categorized by many scholars among the Melungeons found scattered throughout Appalachia.

There were 1,119 households, out of which 27.4% had children under the age of 18 living with them, 44.7% were married couples living together, 11.3% had a female householder with no husband present, and 40.3% were non-families. 36.9% of all households were made up of individuals, and 19.6% had someone living alone who was 65 years of age or older. The average household size was 2.25 and the average family size was 2.92.

The age distribution was 20.9% under the age of 18, 18.0% from 18 to 24, 22.7% from 25 to 44, 19.8% from 45 to 64, and 18.6% who were 65 years of age or older. The median age was 34 years. For every 100 females, there were 78.5 males. For every 100 females age 18 and over, there were 74.2 males.

The median income for a household in the city was $21,528, and the median income for a family was $31,473. Males had a median income of $27,262 versus $20,579 for females. The per capita income for the city was $12,176. About 21.9% of families and 30.7% of the population were below the poverty line, including 39.0% of those under age 18 and 24.5% of those age 65 or over.

== Economy ==
"Apollo" statue on the campus of the now defunct Alderson Broaddus University

Philippi's economy was originally based on coal mining and the railroad industry, but both have declined severely since the mid-20th century. The town's major employers now include Battler's Knob, on the former campus of Alderson Broaddus University which closed in 2023. and Broaddus Hospital. Many inhabitants work in the service industry, education, and family farming.

The city government provides many services and jobs to stimulate the local economy, including water, electric, garbage collection, and waste water treatment facilities. In addition, a professional police and volunteer fire department are provided. The City of Philippi was voted as a 2004 "All American City".

== Education ==
The Barbour County Schools has seven schools including Philippi Elementary School, Philippi Middle School, and Philip Barbour High School.

== Sites of interest ==
- The Philippi Covered Bridge (1852) is located at the junction of U.S. Routes 250 and 119 in downtown Philippi. The bridge is notable for its use during the first land battle of the Civil War. This is the only "twin-barreled" covered bridge located on a federal highway in the United States and it is also one of the longest covered bridges in the country.
- The Barbour County Historical Museum, located in the former railway station, features local history, mostly 19th century. Notable artifacts include the "Philippi Mummies": embalmed corpses of two female asylum inmates (see Trans-Allegheny Lunatic Asylum) that were preserved in 1888 by local doctor (and amateur mummification enthusiast) Graham Hamrick (Mummies restored by local undertaker, Gary E. Schoonover, after they were submerged in water during the 1985 flood.).
- "Campbell Schoolhouse", one-room school preserved on the Alderson Broaddus campus.
- Unusual for a town of its size and location, Philippi is home to a Maronite hermitage, Our Lady of Solitude.

=== Registered Historic Places ===
- Barbour County Courthouse
- Peck-Crim-Chesser House
- Philippi station
- Philippi Covered Bridge
- Philippi Historic District
- Whitescarver Hall

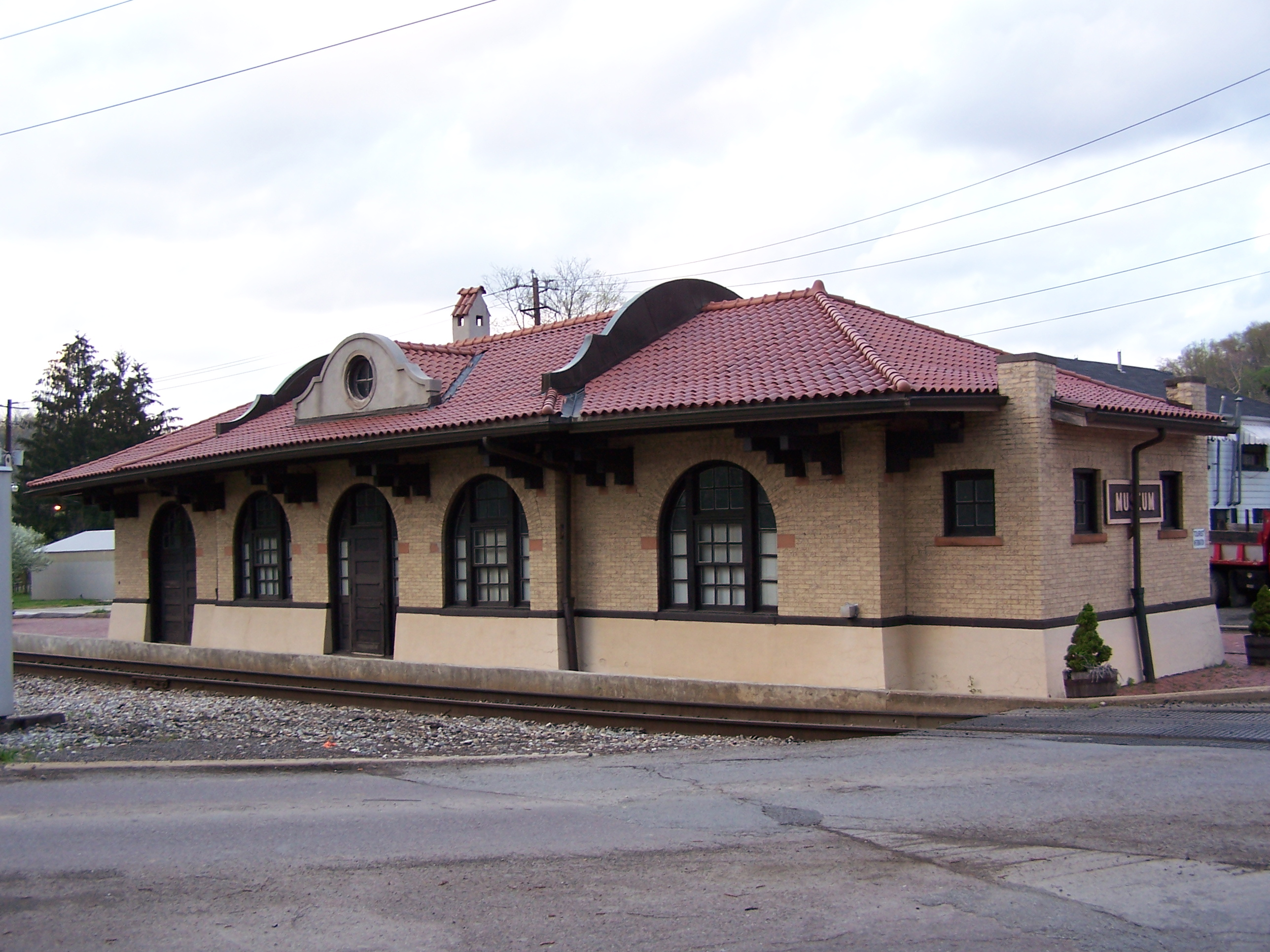
The Philippi B&O Railroad Station (1911) now houses the County Historical Society Museum.

== Notable natives and residents ==
- Ann Maria Reeves Jarvis (1832–1905), social activist who — along with her daughter Anna Marie Jarvis (1864–1948) — is credited with founding Mother's Day, lived in Philippi for several years, both before and after her 1850 marriage.
- Alston G. Dayton (1857–1920), the U.S. representative from West Virginia's 2nd congressional district from 1895 to 1905; born in, and practiced law in, Philippi.
- William Waddell (1907-2007), a member of the Buffalo Soldiers, the first African-American veterinarian to practice in West Virginia, arriving in Philippi c. 1950.
- Jim Fridley (1924-2003), major league baseball player, West Virginia University football star; Outfielder (1952-58) for the Cleveland Indians, Baltimore Orioles and Cincinnati Reds.
- Actor Ted Cassidy (1932–79), who played Lurch and "Thing" on the 1960s TV show The Addams Family, was raised in Philippi, graduating from Philippi High School circa 1948..
- Lyle Williams (August 23, 1942 – November 7, 2008) was a U.S. representative from Ohio. He was born in Philippi.
- Gerald Peary (1944- ), film critic, author of film books, and a documentarian, lived in Philippi as a child from 1948 to 1952.
- Danny Peary (1949- ), best-selling author of baseball biographies (Ralph Kiner, Roger Maris, etc.) and influential film writer of Cult Movies 1,2, and 3 and Guide for the Film Fanatic.
- Scott Mayle (b. 1983), ex-NFL player. Born and raised in Philippi, he played football for Philip Barbour, Ohio University, and finally the NFL.
