= 1944 Appalachians tornado outbreak =

1944 windstorm in the midwestern and eastern United States

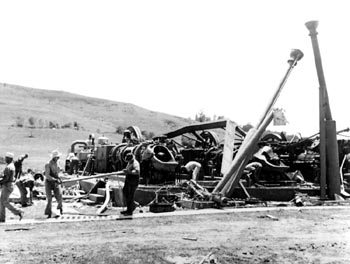
- Damage in Shinnston, West Virginia caused by an F4 tornado that tracked through the town.

Meteorological history
- Duration: June 23, 1944

Tornado outbreak
- Tornadoes: 7+
- Max. rating: F4 tornado

Overall effects
- Casualties: 154+ fatalities 1,044 injuries
- Areas affected: Midwest, Mid-Atlantic

The 1944 Appalachians tornado outbreak was a deadly tornado outbreak that hit the Midwest and Mid-Atlantic regions of the United States on June 22–23, 1944. The outbreak produced several strong tornadoes in Pennsylvania, West Virginia, and Maryland—areas that were falsely believed to be immune to tornadoes. Particularly hard hit was the town of Shinnston in Harrison County, West Virginia, which was destroyed by a violent F4 tornado before 9:00 PM EDT on June 23. A total of 30 people died at Shinnston and at least 104 were killed in the state of West Virginia by this and two other intense tornadoes. The outbreak itself was and still remains the deadliest tornado outbreak ever to hit the state of West Virginia. The Shinnston tornado was and is the only tornado to produce violent damage in West Virginia.

== Confirmed tornadoes ==
Confirmed tornadoes by Fujita rating
FU	F0	F1	F2	F3	F4	F5	Total
0	?	?	1	3	3	0	≥ 7

=== June 23 event ===
List of known tornadoes from June 23, 1944
F#	Location	County	State	Time (UTC)	Path length	Comments/Damage
F3	Rural Valley to Twin Rocks	Armstrong, Indiana, Cambria	PA	2230	30 miles (48 km)	2 deaths – A long-tracked tornado damaged about 50 homes or farmsites in Armstrong County, though only a single home was destroyed; three people were injured. In Indiana County, the tornado destroyed 15 homes, killing two people. Damage in Cambria County may have been caused by downburst winds. Total losses reached $2 million (1944 USD).
F2	S of Edinburg to S of Palmyra	Portage, Mahoning	OH	2300	8 miles (13 km)	Two farmhouses sustained near-F3 damage and eight others were reported damaged. The tornado killed livestock and damaged barns and outbuildings.
F4	Wellsburg, WV to N of Oakland, MD	Brooke (WV), Washington (PA), Greene (PA), Fayette (PA), Preston (WV), Garrett (MD)	WV, PA, MD	2311	85 miles (137 km)	30 deaths – The first of three major, long-lived, violent tornadoes was probably a tornado family that began in West Virginia. The tornado touched down in Wellsburg, unroofing 20 homes and fatally injuring a girl on a farm nearby. The tornado killed 22 people in 15 mi (24 km) of path across Greene County, leveling numerous homes, including 53 in the mining community of Chartiers (10 deaths), east of Clarksville. The tornado killed eight more people at Dry Tavern, near Rices Landing, and destroyed a total of 86 homes in Pennsylvania. After striking Dry Tavern, the tornado passed near Smithfield (then also called Smithville) before lifting for some time. Debris from the storm fell in nearby Uniontown. The tornado may have dissipated and redeveloped into a new tornado that crossed into Maryland, killing three people, injuring 25, and destroying seven homes. The 26 deaths in Pennsylvania made it the deadliest tornado in the state.
F4	S of Pittsburgh to NW of Somerset	Allegheny, Westmoreland, Somerset	PA	2330	50 miles (80 km)	17 deaths – This major tornado affected what is now part of the Pittsburgh metropolitan area, beginning only 8 mi (13 km) south of Pittsburgh. The tornado killed 17 people in Allegheny County, near McKeesport, mainly in the communities of Dravosburg, Port Vue, Versailles, Boston, and Greenock. In these communities, the tornado destroyed almost 88 homes and damaged 306. Many multi-story dwellings were leveled or torn apart, some single-story residences were also leveled, and more than 400 other structures were damaged or destroyed. As the tornado paralleled the Pennsylvania Turnpike, it destroyed six more homes near Donegal and two near Somerset. 200 people were injured.
F4	NW of Wyatt to Shinnston to Cheat Mountain	Marion, Harrison, Taylor, Barbour, Tucker, Randolph	WV	0030	60 miles (97 km)	Main article: 1944 Shinnston tornado 100+ deaths – At about 8:30 p.m. EDT, a powerful tornado touched down in Marion County, West Virginia, northwest of Wyatt. It quickly intensified as it moved to the southeast, killing three people in four homes that were destroyed in Joetown. Over the next 10 mi (16 km), the tornado widened to 1 mi (1.6 km) across and killed at least 72 people. First, the funnel struck the farming community of Wyatt and killed three people in neighboring Peora. It then devastated the town of Shinnston, killing about 30 people in the "Pleasant Hill" part of town. Numerous homes in Pleasant Hill were leveled and had their debris blown into the West Fork River. In the Shinnston area, bark was peeled from trees, a steel radio tower was broken off, vehicles were moved almost 100 feet (30 m) from where they originated, and a large gas plant was leveled. In Taylor County, the tornado killed nine more people, including seven in one family at Simpson. The tornado produced nine other deaths in and near Meadowville, Nestorville, and Philippi. The path passed near Montrose (seven deaths) and ended north of Alpena, on the slopes of Cheat Mountain. 381 people were injured. The death toll was at least 100: some sources indicate that 103 rather than 100 people died in this tornado.
F3	Thomas	Tucker	WV	0325	1 mile (1.6 km)	3 deaths – A tornado damaged or destroyed about 50 homes.
F3	Cambridge, MD to Delmar, DE	Dorchester (MD), Sussex (DE)	MD, DE	0415	28 miles (45 km)	2 deaths – This possible tornado family destroyed a gas station, two barns, three warehouses, and 13 homes at Cambridge. Two people died there, near the beginning of the path. Damages reached $1 million (1944 USD) at Cambridge. Only F1 damage occurred in Delaware as the tornado broke windows, chimneys, and fences.
Sources: Grazulis, Significant, p. 915

== See also ==
- List of North American tornadoes and tornado outbreaks
