= Bonasso =

Bonasso is a surname. Notable people with the surname include:

- Benjamín Bonasso (born 1997), Argentine-American rugby union player
- Miguel Bonasso (born 1940), Argentinian guerrilla leader, writer, and politician
- Samuel G. Bonasso (1939–2025), American career civil engineer, entrepreneur, and inventor
