= The Golden Rule (Belington, West Virginia) =

- U.S. National Register of Historic Places
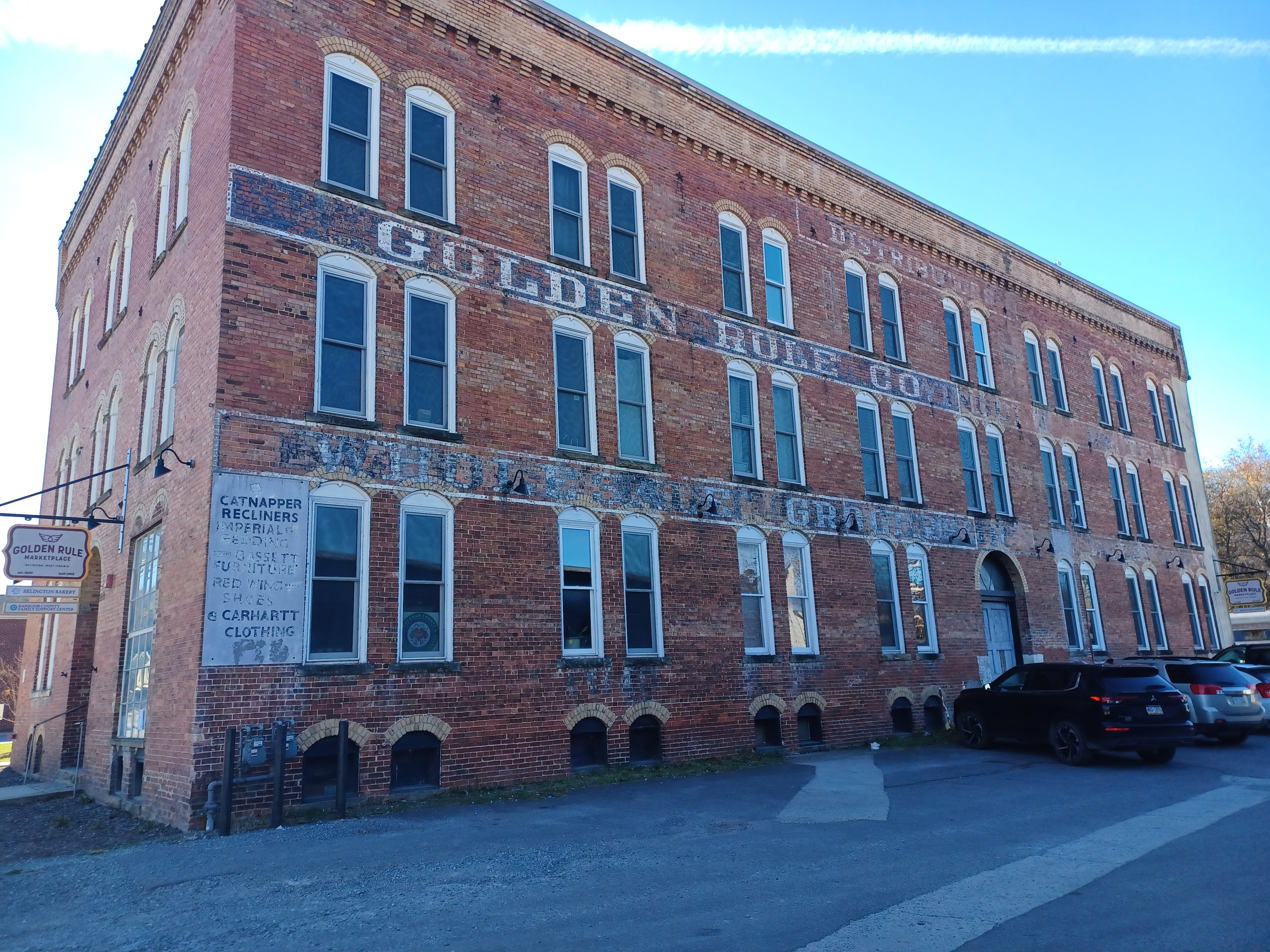
- Former Golden Rule Department Store in 2025

- Location within West Virginia Location within the United States
- Location: Belington, West Virginia
- Coordinates: 39°1′25″N 80°5′12″W
- Built: 1902
- Architect: Luther P. Shinn
- Architectural style: Italianate
- NRHP reference No.: 100003667
- Added to NRHP: April 23, 2019

The Golden Rule, also known as the Valley Grocery Company, is an Italianate-style commercial building in Belington, West Virginia. The three-story brick building was built in 1902 to house the eponymous grocery store, operated by Luther P. Shinn, a local merchant from a prominent area family. The building also served as a warehouse and distribution center for the grocery company. After being listed as endangered in 2014, the property was redeveloped and preserved starting in 2018.

== History ==
Luther Patrick Shinn came from a prominent west central Virginian family. Shinn was born in 1850 in Shinnston, Virginia. Shinn and family members sold supplies to soldiers during the American Civil War. He attended Fairmont Normal School for two years. At the age of 25, Shinn operated a hotel and mercantile establishment in Buckhannon, West Virginia, and in 1892 he designed and built a building at 16 East Main Street in downtown Buckhannon for his dry goods business. This building resembled a smaller version of the building he would eventually build in Belington. Although Shinn sold the business in 1902, he continued to operate new businesses in Buckhannon through his lifetime.

The Valley Grocery Company was established Shinn in Belington in 1902 after he sold his first Buckhannon business. The complex included a corn mill that received and processed grain. By 1929 Shinn had incorporated the company as The Golden Rule, and had expanded his merchandising to include clothing, furniture, flooring and other goods. At about the same time, Shinn worked to establish a wholesale grocery business in Elkins, West Virginia.

Shinn adopted the Golden Rule as his business philosophy, naming his business for that principle. Shinn died in 1933, and was succeeded by his son William Sexton Shinn, who died in 1968. The business was continued by his widow, Wanda E. Ware Shinn Mitchell, and William and Wanda's two sons.

== Description ==
The three-story brick building features a main facade facing east along South Crim Avenue, backing up to CSX Railroad tracks to the rear. The front facade comprises three bays of paired arched windows, a raised basement, and an arched front door at the top of a flight of stairs. The roof is flat. Detailing is simple, with a corbeled cornice detail and contrasting brick arches over the windows. The first floor windows have segmental arches, while the upper stories have fully arched heads. The long north elevation repeats this pattern, with segmental arches for all windows, as does the rear, west elevation. The south elevation is blank brick, with a painted sign advertising the store.

A wood annex housed a gristmill. This disappeared some time after 1923 and was replaced by a smaller wood frame structure..

The interior of the building was left as it was when the store closed, with many finishes, fixtures and furnishings remaining. The building featured a unique water-powered elevator.

== Preservation ==
The Golden Rule was placed on the National Register of Historic Places on April 23, 2019. It had been listed on the Preservation Alliance of West Virginia's 2014 Endangered List.

With the building's listing on the National Register of Historic Places, rehabilitation started to convert the upper levels of the building to ten residential units. Retail space, a small museum, and ticket space for the adjoining Durbin & Greenbrier Valley Railroad were created on the first floor.

== See also ==
- Shinnston Historic District
- Levi Shinn House
