= Jack Mattiford =

American football player (1916–1960)

Profile
- Positions: Guard, end

Personal information
- Born: June 24, 1916; Peora, West Virginia, US
- Died: April 6, 1960 (aged 44); Guilford, Connecticut, US
- Listed height: 5 ft 11 in (1.80 m)
- Listed weight: 210 lb (95 kg)

Career information
- High school: Clarksburg (WV)
- College: Marshall

Career history
- Detroit Lions (1941)

Career statistics
- Games: 10
- Games started: 3
- Receiving yards: 21
- Stats at Pro Football Reference

John Blaker Mattiford (June 24, 1916 – April 6, 1960) was an American football player. He played college football for Marshall University and professional football in the National Football League (NFL) for the Detroit Lions. He appeared in 10 NFL games during the 1941 season. In his college and professional career, he played variously at the guard, end, back, tackle, and placekicker positions. He kicked 20 extra points for Marshall in 1940. The Associated Press referred to him as "the handy man of the 1941 Lions eleven."
