= Ski Lift International =

American aerial lift manufacturer

Ski Lift International (SLI) was an aerial lift manufacturer based out of Incline Village, Nevada. SLI was established in 1965 by co-founders Samuel G. Bonasso and Joseph Sugarman, with Bonasso as its first president. The company built 46 lifts, mainly double chairlifts, from 1965 until 1973. SLI had a prototype gondola and triple chair, but it is unlikely that these designs were ever used. SLI chairlifts can still be seen at ski areas such as 49 Degrees North Washington, or Telluride, Colorado. The company was known for inventing the first maintenance-free bail chair, well before competitors such as Riblet or Hall. SLI shipped pre-welded towers and terminal parts to the ski areas, avoiding welding on site. SLI parts were purchased by Riblet Tramway Company in 1973 after the company went bankrupt. Since then, these lifts continue to be removed due to age, mechanical failures, or to make way for lifts with higher capacity.

== List of SLI lifts still operating ==
Big Bear - Teton Pass, Montana - Double

Chair 2 Grubstake - 49 Degrees North, Washington - Double

Chair 3/Payday - 49 Degrees North, Washington - Double

Chairlift - Thrill Hills, North Dakota - Double

Crystal - Blacktail Mountain, Montana - Double (formerly C-5 at Crystal Mountain, Washington)

J2 - June Mountain, California - Double

J4 - June Mountain, California - Double

Lift 7 - Telluride, Colorado - Double

Little Chief - Meadowlark, Wyoming - Double

Nova - Wolf Creek, Colorado - Double

Oak Street - Telluride, Colorado - Double

Ridge - Diamond Peak, Nevada - Double

Scenic Chairlift - Alpine Slide at Magic Mountain, California - Double

Shadow Mountain - Aspen Mountain, Colorado - Double

World Cup - Heavenly, California - Double

== List of SLI lifts still standing, not operating ==
Chair 1/Timber - Iron Mountain, California - Double (CLOSED)

Chair 2/Little Rabbit - Iron Mountain, California - Double (CLOSED)

Mountain Run, Virginia - Double (CLOSED)
