= Samuel G. Bonasso =

American civil engineer (1939–2025)

Samuel George Bonasso
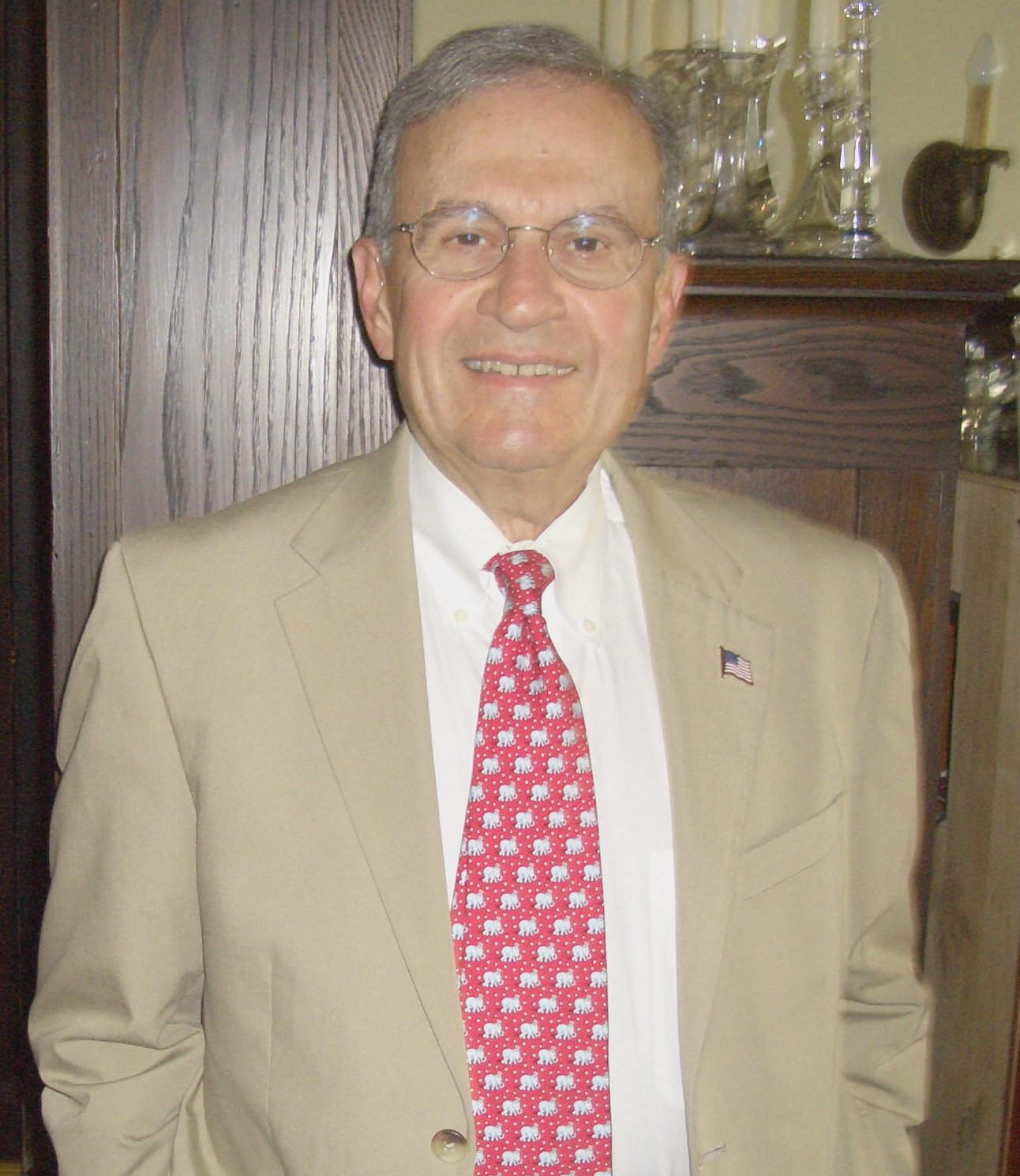

Deputy, then Acting Administrator of the Research and Special Programs Administration at the U.S. Department of Transportation
- In office November 2002 – March 2005
- Preceded by: Ellen Engleman
- Succeeded by: Last

Personal details
- Born: December 12, 1939 Wyatt, West Virginia, U.S.
- Died: July 1, 2025 (aged 85) Morgantown, West Virginia, U.S.
- Party: Republican
- Spouse: Nancy L. Mowrey
- Education: University of Miami, West Virginia University
- Profession: Civil Engineer

Samuel George Bonasso (December 12, 1939 – July 1, 2025) was an American career civil engineer, entrepreneur, and inventor, who also worked as a public servant in the transportation sector at the state and federal levels and contributing innovations in his industry. Bonasso founded three businesses and was the holder of five U.S. patents, Bonasso was West Virginia Secretary of Transportation from 1998 to 2000 in the Governor Cecil H. Underwood administration. He then served as deputy administrator (November 2002 – March 2003), then acting administrator (March 2003 – March 2005), of the Research and Special Programs Administration at the U.S. Department of Transportation under Transportation Secretary Norman Y. Mineta, during the presidency of George W. Bush.

== Background ==
Bonasso was born in Wyatt, West Virginia, to Italian immigrants Pietro G. Bonasso (1895–1947) and Chiara Morasco (1903–1971).

Bonasso obtained his bachelor's degree in civil engineering from the University of Miami in 1962 and earned a master's degree in civil engineering from West Virginia University in 1964.

Bonasso died from Parkinson's disease on July 1, 2025, at age 85.

== Professional career ==
After finishing graduate school, Bonasso, with a group of European investors and manufacturers, co-founded Ski Lift International in Alexandria, Va., serving as its president and chief engineer until 1969. He became a ski lift engineer and builder and an engineering specialist in the operation of large diameter cable driven equipment. He built on his experience into the 1990s and contributed as committee member and secretary to the early 1980s revision of the American National Standards Institute B77.1 American National Standard for Passenger Ropeways.

In 1969, Bonasso founded Alpha Associates in Morgantown, W.Va., which became a regional architectural and engineering design firm. He served as president and managing principal there until 1998. The firm specialized in architecture in K-12 and higher education and health care facilities. Engineering included highways, bridges, ski lifts and aerial tramways, subdivisions, real estate development and utilities. Between 1984 and 1987, Bonasso was awarded four U.S. patents for the Tension Arch structural systems used in bridges, buildings and other structures.

Bonasso stayed at Alpha Associates until selected by West Virginia Gov. Underwood in 1998 to serve as secretary of the Department of Transportation, a position he held until 2000. During his tenure he reorganized the Department of Transportation's State Rail Authority, guided the site selection of the Southern West Virginia Regional Airport and provided senior executive guidance to the final decisions on completing Appalachian Development Highway System Corridor H.

As deputy administrator and acting administrator of the Research and Special Programs Administration at the U.S. Department of Transportation from 2002 to 2005, Bonasso oversaw the reorganization of the administration into two separate agencies. The research, education, and associated policy functions became the Research and Innovative Technology Administration (RITA), while regulatory functions fell under the new Pipeline and Hazardous Materials Safety Administration (PHMSA). Bonasso represented the DOT on the California Fuel Cell Partnership, aimed at promoting the use of hydrogen vehicles in California, and contributed to the initial development of the International Partnership for the Hydrogen Economy. He ended his work at USDOT in March, 2005 as the Deputy Administrator of RITA.

Back in the private sector, Bonasso in 2005 established the Morgantown-based Reinforced Aggregates Co., developer of Mechanical Concrete® and Mechanical Cement® construction material technology. Mechanical Concrete® is a confined-aggregate concrete created by using a cylindrical segment to mechanically confine and integrate crushed stone or other natural or recycled aggregate materials into a cellular load-supporting unit. A common, available form of Mechanical Concrete® is made by combining crushed limestone or similar natural or recycled aggregate with a used vehicle tire with both sidewalls removed. Bonasso received a U.S. patent in 2008 for Mechanical Concrete® and had a patent pending in Canada. The technology was approved in October 2008 by the Division of Highways of the West Virginia Department of Transportation for use in the construction of West Virginia highways.

Throughout his career, Bonasso served at various times as expert witness, organizational development and innovation consultant, accident investigator, arbitrator and standards developer. He was actively involved in organizational consulting in the information technology field.

== Selected publications ==
- Bonasso, Samuel G. (October 2007). "Inquiry, Discovery, Invention, and Innovation — The Personal Experience of Technology Generation and Transfer in Engineering and Scientific Research." Leadership and Management in Engineering 7: 141.
- Bonasso, Samuel G. (April 2002). "Twenty-First-Century Engineering Projects — More than Bricks, Mortar, and Money." Leadership and Management in Engineering 2: 14.
- Bonasso, Samuel G. (January 2001). "Engineering, Leadership, and Integral Philosophy." Journal of Professional Issues in Engineering Education and Practice 127: 17.
- Marocchi, Dante. Aerial Tramways and Ski Lifts: Theory and Planning. Translated by Samuel Bonasso. Morgantown: Alpha Associates, 1983.
- Bonasso, Sam. (June 1982). "Can We Be More Creative?" National essay contest winner, Civil Engineering.

== See also ==
- Joe Sugarman
