= Shinnston Historic District =

Historic district in West Virginia, United States

- U.S. National Register of Historic Places
- U.S. Historic district
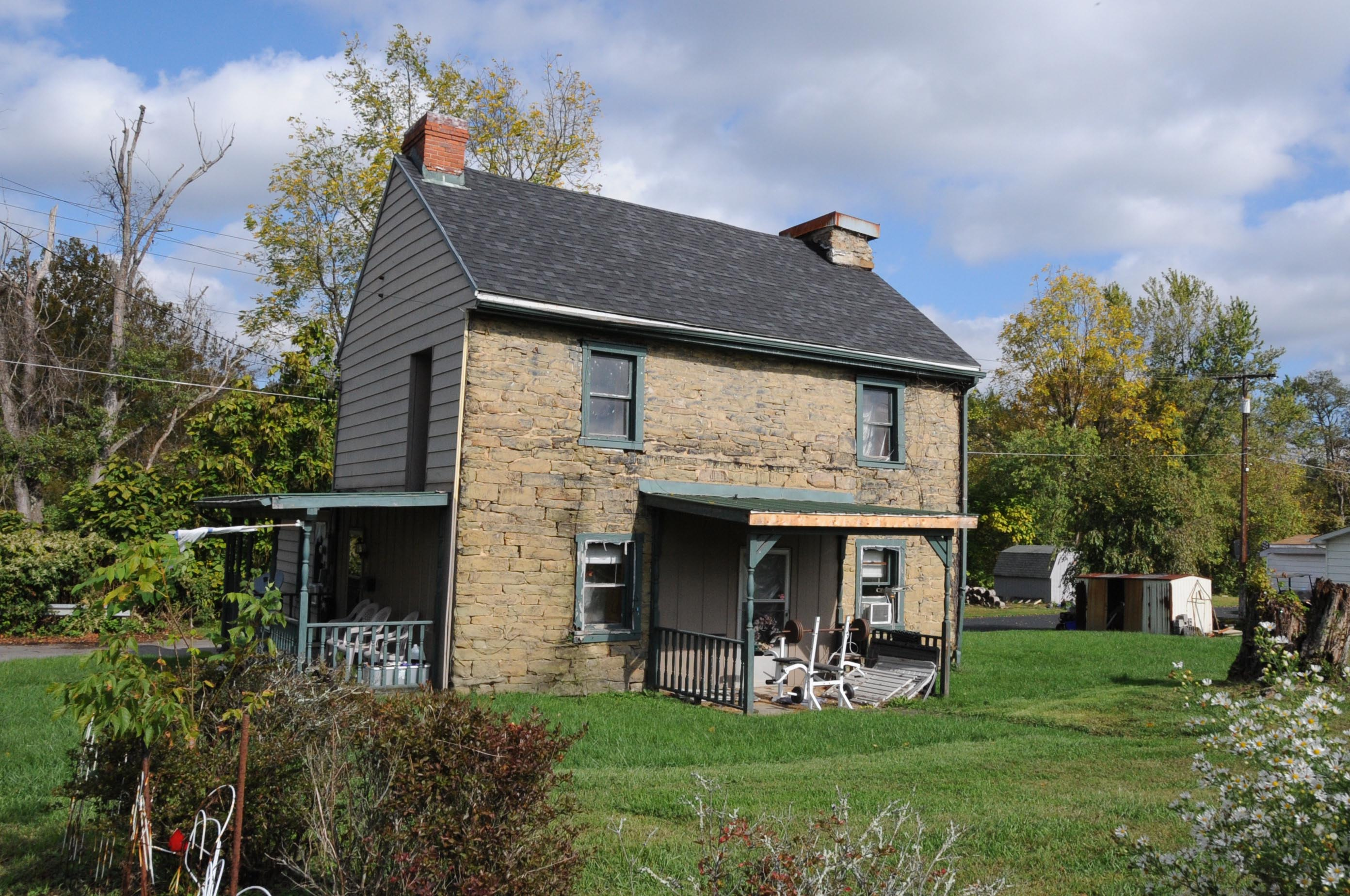
- Aaron Shinn House

- Location within West Virginia Location within the United States
- Location: Roughly bounded by Charles, East, and Clement Sts., and West Fork R., Shinnston, West Virginia
- Coordinates: 39°23′45″N 80°18′3″W
- Area: 45 acres (18 ha)
- Built: 1890
- Architectural style: Gothic, Italianate, Shingle Style
- NRHP reference No.: 98000288
- Added to NRHP: April 1, 1998

Shinnston Historic District is a national historic district located at the confluence of the West Fork River and Shinn's Run, Shinnston, Harrison County, West Virginia.

The district begins on flat plain near the river and sharply rises to hillside to the southeast. US Route 19 travels through the center of the district and is a main throughfare between the commercial centers of Clarksburg and Fairmont. The Baltimore and Ohio Railroad built a line to Shinnston in 1890 and the abandoned rail line passes between Pike Street (US 19) and the West Fork River.

Development of the historic district can be separated into two geographic areas. The original Shinnston street plan was developed in 1815. Charles, Main, Walnut, Bridge, and Rebecca Streets ran perpendicular to the West Fork River while Water, Pike, and High Streets ran parallel to the river. The community remained in this configuration until 1890, when the railroad came to Shinnston. After the coming of the railroad and the industrialization of the area, Shinnston expanded to create and include Station, Mahlon, and Clement Streets.

The district encompasses 143 contributing buildings in the central business district and surrounding residential areas of Shinnston. The major influence on the town's development was the arrival of the Baltimore and Ohio Railroad in 1890. Notable buildings include the Frank Abruzzino House (1922), Aaron Shinn House (c. 1821), I.O.O.F. Lodge building (1906), Dr. Emory Strickler or Wilma Watkins House (c. 1875), Guarascio or Ashby Apartments (c. 1910), and the First National Bank of Shinnston. The district includes notable examples of popular 19th- and early 20th-century architectural styles including Gothic Revival, Italianate, and Shingle Style.

It was listed on the National Register of Historic Places in 1998.

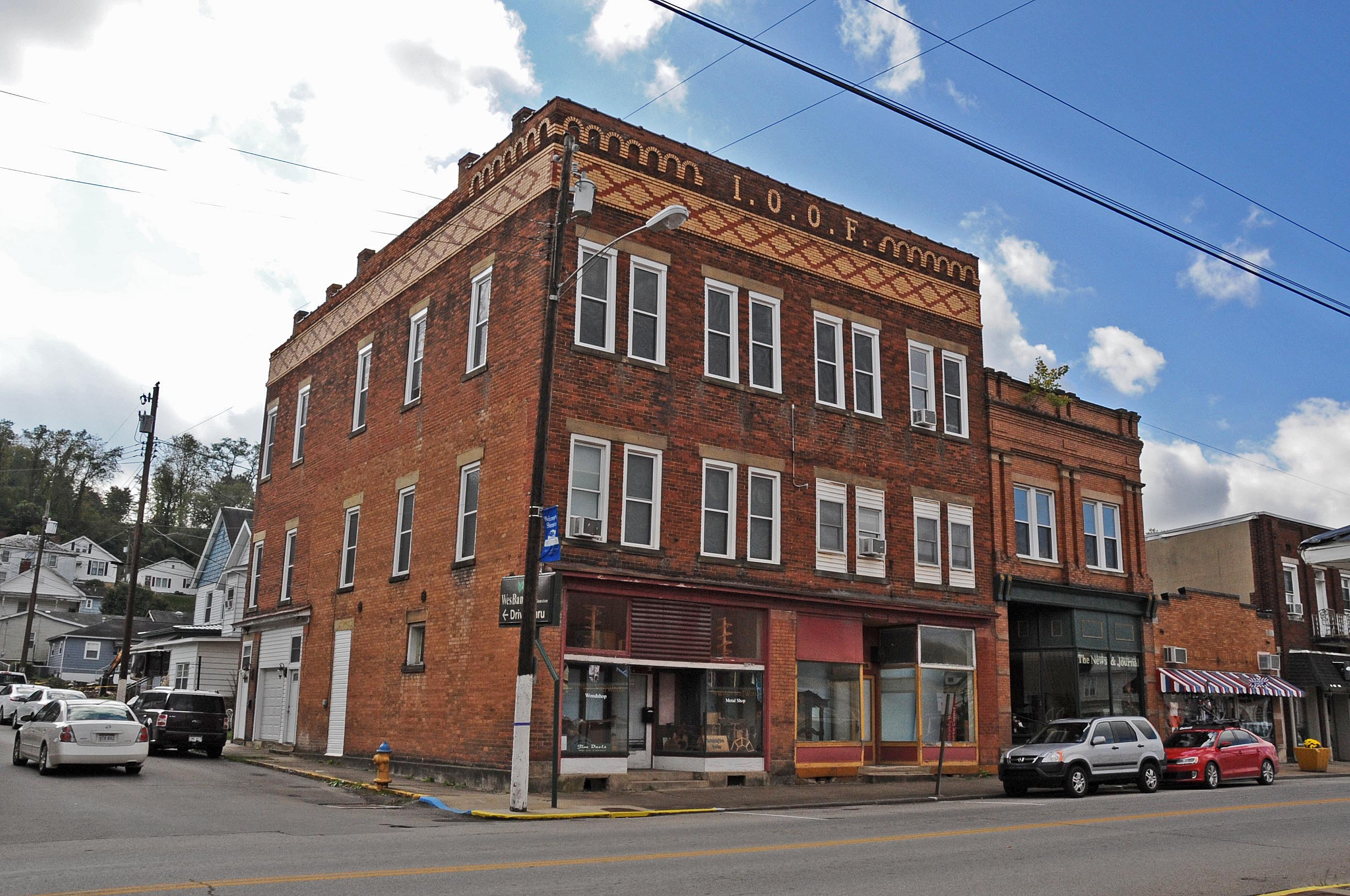
Odd Fellows Hall

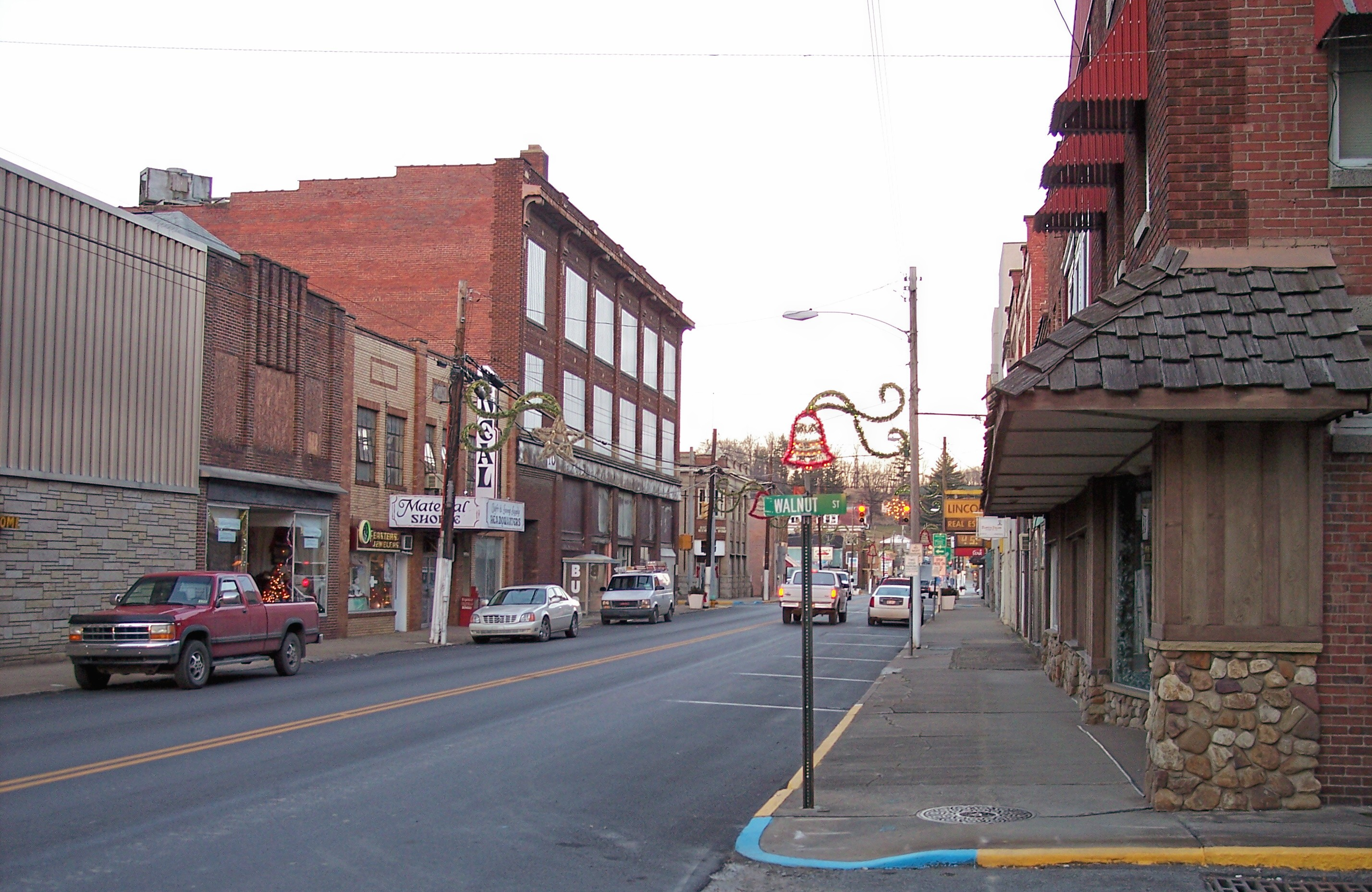
Pike Street

== See also ==
- Levi Shinn House
- The Golden Rule (Belington, West Virginia)
