= Joe Sugarman =

American direct marketing entrepreneur and copywriter (1938–2022)

Joseph Sugarman (April 25, 1938 – March 18, 2022) was an American direct marketing entrepreneur, copywriter, and founder of JS&A Group and BluBlocker Corporation. He was known for his work in direct-response advertising, including mail-order marketing, long-form print advertisements, and television infomercials.

== Early life and education ==
Joe Sugarman was born in Oak Park, Illinois, and raised in the Chicago area. He attended the University of Miami, where he studied electrical engineering, and later served in the United States Army, including service in West Germany.

== Career ==
=== Ski Lift International ===
In 1965, Sugarman co-founded Ski Lift International (SLI), an aerial lift manufacturing company based in Incline Village, Nevada, alongside Samuel G. Bonasso.

=== JS&A Group and mail-order marketing ===
Sugarman founded JS&A Group in 1971, a mail-order company that marketed consumer electronics and technological novelty products directly to consumers through print advertising.

His company sold emerging consumer technologies including pocket calculators, digital watches, and electronic chess computers. The New York Times described Sugarman as a "mail-order maverick" whose advertising style relied on editorial storytelling rather than traditional advertising formats.

Sugarman's advertisements appeared in national publications including The Wall Street Journal, Popular Mechanics, and other magazines, using detailed product explanations and narrative copy designed to generate direct consumer response.

By 1979, JS&A had reported annual revenues of approximately $12 million and employed about 70 people. The company was known for marketing innovative consumer electronics products that were not widely available through traditional retail channels.

Among the products marketed by JS&A were consumer chess computers, which were promoted using endorsements from prominent chess figures including world chess champion Anatoly Karpov. These products were sold using direct-response marketing methods that enabled consumers to order directly from advertisements.

==== Federal Trade Commission dispute ====
In 1981, the Federal Trade Commission (FTC) filed a complaint in federal court against Sugarman and JS&A Group Inc., alleging violations of federal consumer-protection laws and the FTC’s Mail Order Rule, including failure to ship merchandise within required time frames.

The dispute received national media attention. United Press International reported that Sugarman publicly criticized the FTC’s actions and undertook advertising campaigns attacking the agency. Time magazine described the case as part of a broader confrontation between the FTC and mail-order firms during that period, noting Sugarman’s public opposition to the agency.

=== Direct-response television and infomercials ===
Sugarman later expanded into television advertising using direct-response infomercials.

His infomercials frequently featured street interviews, product demonstrations, and conversational presentations combined with toll-free telephone ordering systems, allowing viewers to purchase products directly.

His advertising style differed from conventional television commercials by using longer-form storytelling and testimonials to build consumer trust and engagement.

=== BluBlocker sunglasses ===
In 1986, Sugarman introduced BluBlocker sunglasses, which became his most widely recognized commercial product.

BluBlockers were marketed primarily through television infomercials and direct-response advertising campaigns, with Sugarman appearing in advertisements personally.

The BluBlocker infomercials became widely recognizable and contributed to the brand's commercial success.

Time magazine later identified BluBlocker as one of the most notable infomercial-marketed products, highlighting its cultural visibility and widespread advertising presence.

== Awards and recognition ==
Sugarman received industry recognition including being named Direct Marketer of the Year in 1979 and receiving the Maxwell Sackheim Award.

== Publications ==
Sugarman authored several books on marketing and persuasion, including:

- Success Forces (1980)
- Advertising Secrets of the Written Word (1998)
- Triggers (1999)
- The Adweek Copywriting Handbook (2006)

His books have been used as instructional material in marketing and advertising education.

== Personal life and death ==
Sugarman lived in Las Vegas, Nevada, in his later years.

He died on March 18, 2022, at the age of 83.
