= Levi Shinn House =

Historic house in West Virginia, United States

- U.S. National Register of Historic Places
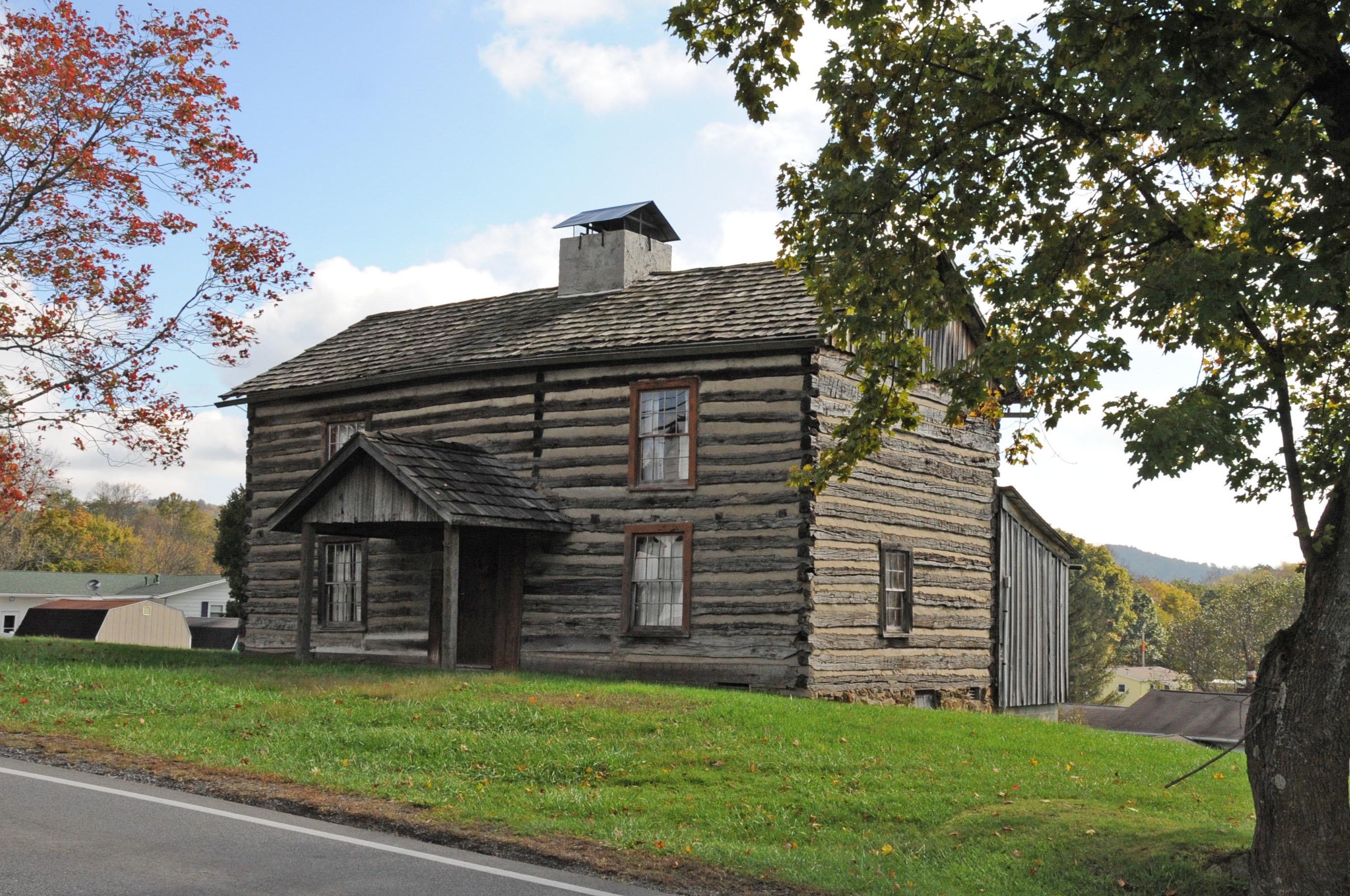

- Location within West Virginia Location within the United States
- Location: Clarksburg Rd. (U.S. 19), Shinnston, West Virginia
- Coordinates: 39°23′13″N 80°18′40″W
- Area: 0.2 acres (0.081 ha)
- Built: 1778
- Built by: Levi Shinn
- Architectural style: log building
- NRHP reference No.: 73001907
- Added to NRHP: July 16, 1973

Levi Shinn House is a historic home located at Shinnston, Harrison County, West Virginia. It is a log dwelling built in 1778, and measuring 37 feet long and 20 feet deep. It features a large interior chimney, providing fireplaces for several of the interior rooms. It is the oldest standing house in north central West Virginia. It was acquired in 1972 by the Shinnston Historical Association and is sometimes open to the public.

The house was the residence of Levi Shinn, the namesake of Shinnston. It was listed on the National Register of Historic Places in 1973.

== See also ==
- Shinnston Historic District
- The Golden Rule (Belington, West Virginia)
