= Peora, West Virginia =

- Unincorporated community
- Location within West Virginia Location within the United States
- Coordinates: 39°25′17″N 80°20′41″W
- Country: United States
- State: West Virginia
- County: Harrison
- Elevation: 965 ft (294 m)
- Time zone: UTC-5 (Eastern (EST))
  - Summer (DST): UTC-4 (EDT)
- Area codes: 304 & 681
- GNIS feature ID: 1555325

Peora is an unincorporated community in Harrison County, West Virginia, United States. Peora is 3 miles (4.8 km) northwest of Shinnston.
