= Shinnston, West Virginia =

City in West Virginia, US

- City
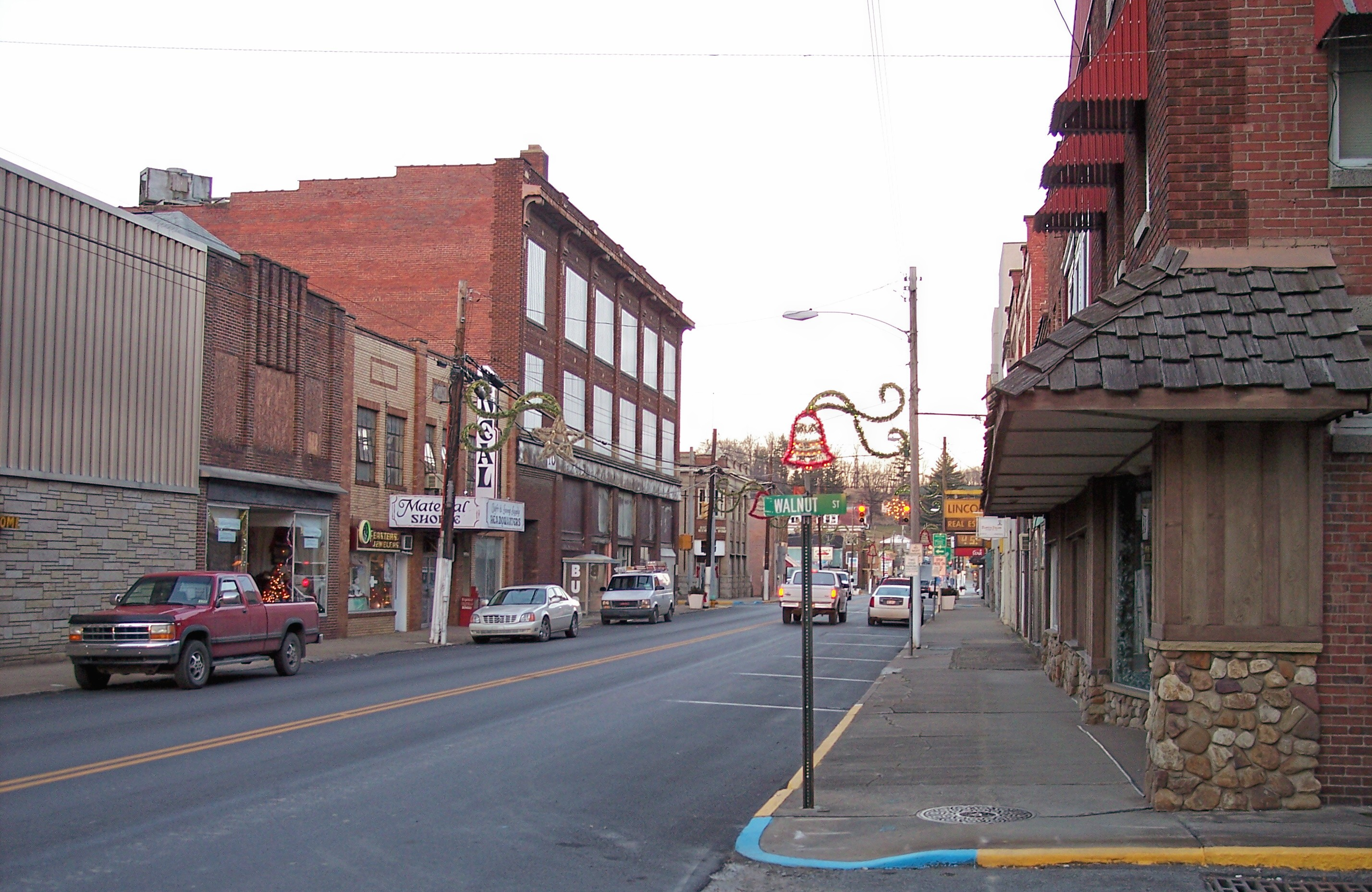
- Pike Street (U.S. Route 19) in downtown Shinnston in 2006

- Location of Shinnston in Harrison County, West Virginia
- Coordinates: 39°23′39″N 80°18′1″W
- Country: United States
- State: West Virginia
- County: Harrison

Government
  - Type: Manager Plan
  - City Manager: Tori Drainer
  - Mayor: Patrick A. Kovalck

Area
  - Total: 1.67 sq mi (4.33 km^{2})
  - Land: 1.67 sq mi (4.33 km^{2})
  - Water: 0 sq mi (0.00 km^{2})
- Elevation: 928 ft (283 m)

Population (2020)
  - Total: 2,328
  - Estimate (2021): 2,306
  - Density: 1,258.7/sq mi (485.98/km^{2})
- Time zone: UTC-5 (Eastern (EST))
  - Summer (DST): UTC-4 (EDT)
- ZIP code: 26431
- Area code: 304
- FIPS code: 54-73636
- GNIS feature ID: 1555613
- Website: Official website

Shinnston is a city and former coal town in Harrison County, West Virginia, United States, along the West Fork River. In 1778, Levi Shinn constructed his log home along what is now Route 19; today it is the oldest standing structure in north-central West Virginia. As of the 2020 census, Shinnston had a population of 2,332.

== History ==
The roots of Shinnston date back to 1778, when Levi Shinn constructed his log home. The log house, located along Route 19, is the oldest standing structure in North Central West Virginia. It is maintained by the Shinnston Historical Association, which opens the home for tours by the general public.

In 1815, the town was laid out with three streets, running parallel with the river, and with four crossing streets running at right angles to them. The town was incorporated in 1852 as Shinn's Town by an act of the Virginia legislature, as West Virginia did not yet exist as an independent state. Solomon S. Fleming was elected as the first mayor.

A new charter was secured in 1877 and the town's name was changed to Shinnston. In 1915, Shinnston's charter provided for a Mayor-Council form of government. This model remained in place for over 70 years and in 1998, the citizens voted to revise the charter to adopt a City Manager-Council form of local government. That model was implemented on July 1, 1998 and remains in place today.

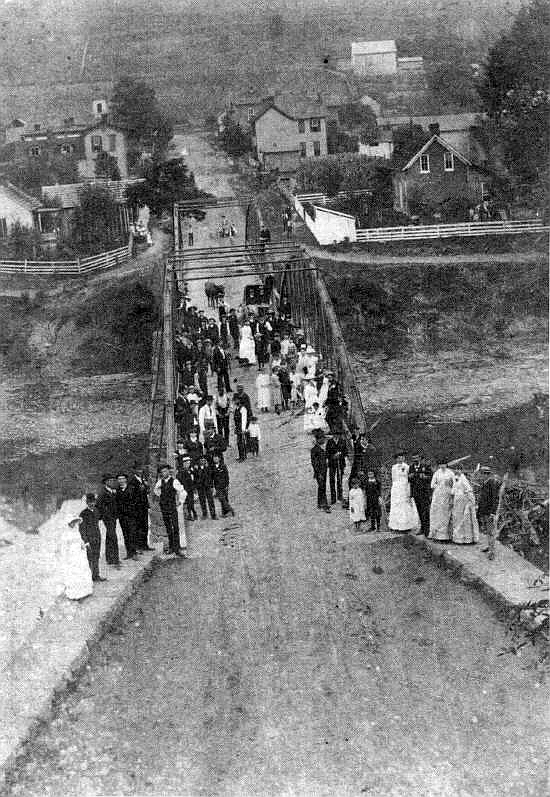
West Fork River Bridge in Shinnston, 1887

Shinnston has enjoyed a history of active commerce, with its beginnings built around both grain mills and saw mills. In its early years, the town saw the development of a tannery, wagon makers, an undertaker, mercantile interests, a pottery, and a local newspaper. The railroad came to the area in 1890, and the first bank opened in 1899. From 1906 to 1947 a trolley operated in the area, offering another form of transportation. As is true for much of West Virginia, energy has been a vital component in the city's history. By the early 1900's, oil wells and gas wells joined coal as major economic forces. Energy generation continues to be a major source of jobs and economic activity today, as evidenced by the existing mines as well as the nearby Harrison Power Station. The city's economy has also seen a shift to service-oriented businesses.

Shinnston has also enjoyed a diverse culture of many faiths and denominations. The first church was organized in 1786 and held meetings and services in several homes until the construction of the first church building in 1835. Area churches have formed a Council of Churches offering shared services with members of several faiths.

By 1813, the first school was organized with classes taught in a small log cabin. In 1860, a larger building was constructed for use as a town hall and academy. This turned into the first public school in 1865. The first grade school was established in 1895, and Shinnston High School was added in 1907. In 1978, Shinnston and Lumberport High Schools were combined to form Lincoln High School.

Over the years residents have been challenged by natural disasters, including the Shinnston tornado, which hit on June 23, 1944. The community has developed the Lowe Public Library, the Clay District Veterans Memorial, the Bice-Ferguson Memorial Museum, and Ferguson Park.

=== Shinnston Tornado ===
The deadliest tornado in West Virginia's history struck Shinnston at 8:30 p.m., June 23, 1944. Sixty-six people died in the town and surrounding area. The total number of people killed by the tornado was 103, with 430 serious injuries. After wreaking havoc in farming communities northwest of Shinnston, the twister hit hardest in a neighborhood known as Pleasant Hill, where no more than 10 houses were left standing. The tornado then continued to Shinns Run and Booths Creek, where it destroyed a large natural gas compressor station, passing on through Marion, Taylor, and Barbour counties before blowing out in Randolph County.

After the initial deaths and maiming, the greatest destruction was to property and the infrastructure. Power lines went down, including a huge tower and high-voltage transmission line near Saltwell. The two hospitals in Clarksburg had to treat victims by candle and flashlight. Phone service, however, was disrupted for only a short time, thanks to wartime emergency backup preparations. Among the many unexpected ways people helped each other were the lending of generators to the hospitals by a traveling circus and grave digging by the prison camp laborers from Gypsy, north of Shinnston. Selfless efforts were also made by elected officials, the National Guard, police, road crews, firefighters, nurses, doctors, and common citizens.

The Shinnston Tornado was part of a broader outbreak of tornadoes and violent weather in the northern Appalachian region during the period of June 22–23, 1944. Tornadoes were reported in Pennsylvania, Maryland and West Virginia, including several tornadoes in a zone from Wellsburg, West Virginia, across southwestern Pennsylvania to Garrett County, Maryland, on June 23. The Shinnston Tornado was the deadliest and most destructive of the June 22–23 tornadoes.

Tornadoes are rare in West Virginia, which has among the nation's lowest rates of occurrence for such storms. The Shinnston Tornado was estimated to have been an F-4 tornado, the second highest of the rankings currently assigned to tornadoes. F-4 storms produce winds faster than 206 miles per hour, capable of leveling houses and throwing automobiles.

=== Civil War ===
The area was heavily Northern in its sentiments during the Civil War, and many local men served in the Union Army. Shinnston was raided by Confederates during the Jones-Imboden raids of 1863.

=== Other historical events ===
- The settlement of Shinnston dates to the 1778 building of Levi Shinn's log house, whom the area was named after. It was listed on the National Register of Historic Places in 1973.
- In 1815, the town was laid out with three streets running parallel with the river and with four crossing streets running at right angles to them.
- The town was incorporated in 1852 as Shinn's Town by an act of the Virginia Legislature, as West Virginia did not yet exist as an independent state, and Solomon S. Fleming was elected the first mayor.
- A new charter was secured in 1877 and the Town's name changed to Shinnston.
- In 1915, Shinnston's Charter provided for a Mayor-Council form of government. This model remained in place for over 70 years and in 1998 the citizens voted to revise the Charter and adopt a City Manager-Council form of local government. That model was implemented on July 1, 1998 and Shinnston now has its fourth City Manager.
- In its beginnings the town was built around both Grain Mills and Saw Mills. In its early the years the town saw the development of a tannery, wagon makers and undertaker, mercantile interests, a pottery, and a local newspaper.
- The first Bank began in 1899.
- The railroad came to Shinnston in 1890.
- A trolley operated from 1906 to 1947.
- The first church was organized in 1786 and met in various homes in the community until 1835, when the first church building was erected.
- The first school was organized in 1813 with classes taught in a small log cabin. In 1860 a larger building was constructed for use as a town hall and academy. This venture became the first public school in 1865. The first grade school was created in 1895 and Shinnston High School was added to it in 1907. In 1978, Shinnston and Lumberport High Schools were combined to form Lincoln High School.
- The Shinnston Historic District was listed on the National Register of Historic Places in 1998.

== Geography ==
Shinnston is located at 39°23′39″N 80°18′1″W (39.394030, -80.300273). in northern Harrison County

According to the United States Census Bureau, the city has a total area of 1.73 square miles (4.48 km^{2}), all land.

== Demographics ==
Historical population
Census	Pop.	Note	%±
1880	289		—
1890	403		39.4%
1900	535		32.8%
1910	1,224		128.8%
1920	1,679		37.2%
1930	2,802		66.9%
1940	2,817		0.5%
1950	2,793		−0.9%
1960	2,724		−2.5%
1970	2,576		−5.4%
1980	3,059		18.8%
1990	2,543		−16.9%
2000	2,295		−9.8%
2010	2,201		−4.1%
2020	2,328		5.8%
2021 (est.)	2,306		−0.9%
U.S. Decennial Census

=== 2020 census ===
As of the 2020 census, Shinnston had a population of 2,328. The median age was 44.4 years. 20.7% of residents were under the age of 18 and 22.0% of residents were 65 years of age or older. For every 100 females there were 93.7 males, and for every 100 females age 18 and over there were 89.7 males age 18 and over.

99.6% of residents lived in urban areas, while 0.4% lived in rural areas.

There were 1,048 households in Shinnston, of which 25.7% had children under the age of 18 living in them. Of all households, 44.6% were married-couple households, 18.6% were households with a male householder and no spouse or partner present, and 30.5% were households with a female householder and no spouse or partner present. About 33.8% of all households were made up of individuals and 14.6% had someone living alone who was 65 years of age or older.

There were 1,151 housing units, of which 8.9% were vacant. The homeowner vacancy rate was 0.8% and the rental vacancy rate was 7.0%.

Racial composition as of the 2020 census
Race	Number	Percent
White	2,176	93.5%
Black or African American	40	1.7%
American Indian and Alaska Native	1	0.0%
Asian	6	0.3%
Native Hawaiian and Other Pacific Islander	2	0.1%
Some other race	6	0.3%
Two or more races	97	4.2%
Hispanic or Latino (of any race)	31	1.3%

=== 2010 census ===
As of the census of 2010, there were 2,201 people, 949 households, and 629 families living in the city. The population density was 1,272.3 inhabitants per square mile (491.2/km^{2}). There were 1,087 housing units at an average density of 628.3 per square mile (242.6/km^{2}). The racial makeup of the city was 97.7% White, 0.3% African American, 0.4% Native American, 0.2% Asian, 0.1% Pacific Islander, 0.1% from other races, and 1.3% from two or more races. Hispanic or Latino of any race were 1.1% of the population.

There were 949 households, of which 27.2% had children under the age of 18 living with them, 50.7% were married couples living together, 11.4% had a female householder with no husband present, 4.2% had a male householder with no wife present, and 33.7% were non-families. 29.2% of all households were made up of individuals, and 14.3% had someone living alone who was 65 years of age or older. The average household size was 2.32 and the average family size was 2.87.

The median age in the city was 43.1 years. 20.6% of residents were under the age of 18; 7.3% were between the ages of 18 and 24; 25% were from 25 to 44; 29.3% were from 45 to 64; and 17.9% were 65 years of age or older. The gender makeup of the city was 48.1% male and 51.9% female.

=== 2000 census ===
As of the census of 2000, there were 2,295 people, 982 households, and 657 families living in the city. The population density was 1,330.8 people per square mile (515.2/km^{2}). There were 1,103 housing units at an average density of 639.6 per square mile (247.6/km^{2}). The racial makeup of the city was 98.39% White, 0.26% African American, 0.31% Native American, 0.13% Asian, 0.04% Pacific Islander, 0.04% from other races, and 0.83% from two or more races. Hispanic or Latino of any race were 1.22% of the population.

There were 982 households, out of which 27.2% had children under the age of 18 living with them, 53.4% were married couples living together, 11.0% had a female householder with no husband present, and 33.0% were non-families. 30.1% of all households were made up of individuals, and 17.6% had someone living alone who was 65 years of age or older. The average household size was 2.34 and the average family size was 2.90. In the city, the population was spread out, with 20.9% under the age of 18, 9.5% from 18 to 24, 24.0% from 25 to 44, 25.7% from 45 to 64, and 19.9% who were 65 years of age or older. The median age was 41 years. For every 100 females, there were 88.0 males. For every 100 females age 18 and over, there were 83.2 males.

The median income for a household in the city was $26,786, and the median income for a family was $38,207. Males had a median income of $29,609 versus $20,156 for females. The per capita income for the city was $16,352. About 14.2% of families and 18.1% of the population were below the poverty line, including 34.8% of those under age 18 and 6.8% of those age 65 or over.

== Infrastructure ==
=== Transportation ===
- U.S. Highway 19
- West Virginia Route 20
- West Virginia Route 131

== Notable people ==
- Frank Abruzzino, football player
- Dick Brown, catcher in Major League Baseball during the 1950s and 1960s
- Larry Brown, Major League Baseball infielder who played from 1963 to 1974
- Lee King, Major League Baseball outfielder who played in 1922 World Series, died in Shinnston
- John McKay, coach of USC Trojans football (1960–75) and Tampa Bay Buccaneers (1976–84), member of College Football Hall of Fame, grew up here and graduated from Shinnston High School
- Josh Richards, race car driver
- Clay Riley, state delegate
- Joe Stydahar, football player inducted into the Pro Football Hall of Fame, grew up here and attended Shinnston High School

== Popular culture ==
- In 2024, scenes in the film Gaslit By My Husband: The Morgan Metzer Story were filmed in Shinnston.
- In 2024, scenes in the film The Bad Guardian were filmed in Shinnston.
- In 1899, Author and state founder Granville Davisson Hall fictionalized a Shinnston tavern in his novel, Daughter of the Elm, and native Meredith Sue Willis has drawn upon Shinnston memories for her novels.
