= Wyatt, West Virginia =

- Unincorporated community
- Location within West Virginia Location within the United States
- Coordinates: 39°26′06″N 80°21′12″W
- Country: United States
- State: West Virginia
- County: Harrison
- Elevation: 988 ft (301 m)
- Time zone: UTC-5 (Eastern (EST))
  - Summer (DST): UTC-4 (EDT)
- ZIP code: 26463
- Area codes: 304 & 681
- GNIS feature ID: 1549439

Wyatt is an unincorporated community in Harrison County, West Virginia, United States. Wyatt is 4 miles (6.4 km) north of Lumberport. Wyatt has a post office with ZIP code 26463.

The community was named after Z. W. Wyatt.
