= Cloverdale =

Cloverdale may refer to:

== Place names ==
Australia

- Cloverdale, Western Australia

Canada

- Cloverdale, Edmonton, Alberta, a neighborhood
- Cloverdale, Surrey, British Columbia
- Cloverdale, New Brunswick
- Cloverdale, Nova Scotia
- Cloverdale Mall in Toronto, Ontario

United States

- Cloverdale, Montgomery, Alabama
- Cloverdale Historic District, Montgomery, Alabama, listed on the NRHP in Alabama
- Cloverdale, California
- Cloverdale, Indiana
- Cloverdale, Iowa
- Cloverdale, Kansas
- Cloverdale, Minnesota
- Cloverdale, Mississippi
- Cloverdale, Missouri
- Cloverdale archaeological site, Missouri
- Cloverdale, New Mexico
- Cloverdale, Ohio
- in Oregon:
  - Cloverdale, Oregon, in Tillamook County (census-designated place)
  - Cloverdale, Deschutes County, Oregon (unincorporated community)
  - Cloverdale, Lane County, Oregon (unincorporated community)
- Hamlet of Cloverdale, in Westford, Vermont
- Cloverdale, Virginia
- Cloverdale (Washington, D.C.), a Colonial Revival home listed on the NRHP in Washington, D.C.
- Cloverdale, Monroe County, West Virginia
- Cloverdale, Pleasants County, West Virginia
- Cloverdale, Wisconsin

== Other uses ==
- Cloverdale Corporation, publishing corporation
- Cloverdale, an episode from the TV show Stargate Universe
