= Cloverdale, West Virginia =

Cloverdale may refer to the following communities in West Virginia:

- Cloverdale, Monroe County, West Virginia
- Cloverdale, Pleasants County, West Virginia
