= List of Heritage Landmarks of The United Methodist Church =

Heritage Landmarks of The United Methodist Church are buildings or locations significant to the history of the United Methodist Church. There are currently 49 landmarks designated by the General Conference.

== Landmarks ==
Name	Image	City	State	Country
Asbury Manual Labor School/Mission		Fort Mitchell	Alabama	United States
Barratt's Chapel and Museum		Frederica	Delaware	United States
Bethune-Cookman University/Foundation		Daytona Beach	Florida	United States
Town of Oxford		Oxford	Georgia	United States
John Wesley's American Parish		Savannah	Georgia	United States
St. Simons Island		St. Simons Island	Georgia	United States
Wesleyan College Cluster		Macon	Georgia	United States
Peter Cartwright Church		Pleasant Plains	Illinois	United States
Wesley Foundation, University of Illinois		Champaign	Illinois	United States
Site of the Organization of the Methodist Episcopal Church, South		Louisville	Kentucky	United States
Cox Memorial United Methodist Church		Hallowell	Maine	United States
Old Otterbein Church		Baltimore	Maryland	United States
Robert Strawbridge House		New Windsor	Maryland	United States
Cokesbury College Site		Abingdon	Maryland	United States
Lovely Lane Meetinghouse Site		Baltimore	Maryland	United States
United Brethren Founding Sites Cluster		Frederick and Washington Counties	Maryland	United States
Woman's Foreign Missionary Society of the Methodist Episcopal Church		Boston	Massachusetts	United States
Gulfside United Methodist Assembly		Waveland	Mississippi	United States
Pearl River United Methodist Church		Madison County	Mississippi	United States
Old McKendree Chapel		near Jackson	Missouri	United States
John Street Church		Manhattan, New York City	New York	United States
New York Presbyterian Brooklyn Methodist Hospital		Brooklyn, New York City	New York	United States
Green Hill House		Louisburg	North Carolina	United States
Whitaker's Chapel		Enfield	North Carolina	United States
Bishop John Seybert/Flat Rock Cluster		near Flat Rock	Ohio	United States
Hanby House		Westerville	Ohio	United States
Wyandott Indian Mission		Upper Sandusky	Ohio	United States
Newtown Indian United Methodist Church		Okmulgee	Oklahoma	United States
Willamette Mission Site		near Salem	Oregon	United States
Albright Chapel		Kleinfeltersville	Pennsylvania	United States
Boehm's Chapel		Willow Street	Pennsylvania	United States
First Church Building and Publishing House, Evangelical Association		New Berlin	Pennsylvania	United States
First United Methodist Church		Johnstown	Pennsylvania	United States
Isaac Long's Barn		Landis Valley, Lititz	Pennsylvania	United States
St. George's Church		Philadelphia	Pennsylvania	United States
Simpson House "Olde Main Building"		Philadelphia	Pennsylvania	United States
Zoar United Methodist Church		Philadelphia	Pennsylvania	United States
Deadwood Cluster		Deadwood	South Dakota	United States
Acuff Chapel		Blountville	Tennessee	United States
Edward Cox House		Bluff City	Tennessee	United States
McMahan Chapel		San Augustine	Texas	United States
Rutersville Cluster		Rutersville	Texas	United States
Keywood Marker		Glade Spring	Virginia	United States
Old Stone Church Site		Leesburg	Virginia	United States
Rehoboth Church and Museum		Union	West Virginia	United States
United Methodist Building		Capitol Hill	Washington D.C.	United States
College of West Africa		Monrovia		Liberia
Mary Johnston Hospital		Manila		Philippines
Old Mutare Mission				Zimbabwe

== See also ==
- History of Methodism in the United States
