= Red Sulphur Springs =

Red Sulphur Springs may refer to:

- Red Sulphur Springs, Tennessee
- Red Sulphur Springs, West Virginia
- Red Sulphur Springs Hotel
