= Pickaway (disambiguation) =

Pickaway may refer to:

== Places ==
- Pickaway, Virginia, in Pittsylvania County
- Pickaway, West Virginia, in Monroe County
- Pickaway County, Ohio
- Pickaway Plains, Ohio
- Pickaway Rural Historic District, Pickaway, West Virginia
- Pickaway Township, Shelby County, Illinois
- Pickaway Township, Pickaway County, Ohio

== Other uses ==
- Pickaway Correctional Institution, Pickaway County, Ohio
- Pickaway County Memorial Airport in Ohio
- USS Pickaway, a transport ship
