= Pedro, West Virginia =

- Unincorporated community
- Location within West Virginia Location within the United States
- Coordinates: 37°39′46″N 80°18′52″W
- Country: United States
- State: West Virginia
- County: Monroe
- Elevation: 2,352 ft (717 m)
- Time zone: UTC-5 (Eastern (EST))
  - Summer (DST): UTC-4 (EDT)
- Area codes: 304 & 681
- GNIS feature ID: 1552449

Pedro is an unincorporated community in Monroe County, West Virginia, United States. Pedro is located near the Virginia border, northeast of Union.

The community perhaps was named after the local Pedro family.
