= Roxalia, West Virginia =

- Unincorporated community
- Location within West Virginia Location within the United States
- Coordinates: 37°36′08″N 80°20′59″W
- Country: United States
- State: West Virginia
- County: Monroe
- Elevation: 2,552 ft (778 m)
- Time zone: UTC-5 (Eastern (EST))
  - Summer (DST): UTC-4 (EDT)
- Area codes: 304 & 681
- GNIS feature ID: 1555535

Roxalia is an unincorporated community in Monroe County, West Virginia, United States. Roxalia is east of Union.
