= Willow Bend, West Virginia =

- Unincorporated community
- Location within West Virginia Location within the United States
- Coordinates: 37°32′07″N 80°32′18″W
- Country: United States
- State: West Virginia
- County: Monroe
- Elevation: 1,919 ft (585 m)
- Time zone: UTC-5 (Eastern (EST))
  - Summer (DST): UTC-4 (EDT)
- Area codes: 304 & 681
- GNIS feature ID: 1549195

Willow Bend is an unincorporated community in Monroe County, West Virginia, United States. Willow Bend is 4 miles (6.4 km) south of Union.
