= Hollywood, West Virginia =

Hollywood, West Virginia may refer to:

- Hollywood, Raleigh County, West Virginia, an unincorporated community
- Hollywood, Monroe County, West Virginia, an unincorporated community
