= Keenan, West Virginia =

- Unincorporated community
- Location within West Virginia Location within the United States
- Coordinates: 37°35′07″N 80°29′07″W
- Country: United States
- State: West Virginia
- County: Monroe
- Elevation: 2,303 ft (702 m)
- Time zone: UTC-5 (Eastern (EST))
  - Summer (DST): UTC-4 (EDT)
- Area codes: 304 & 681
- GNIS feature ID: 1551627

Keenan is an unincorporated community in Monroe County, West Virginia, United States. Keenan is located on West Virginia Route 3, east of Union.

The community was named after Edward Keenan, a local landowner.
