= Glace, West Virginia =

Unincorporated community in West Virginia, United States

- Unincorporated community
- Location within West Virginia Location within the United States
- Coordinates: 37°40′37″N 80°20′36″W
- Country: United States
- State: West Virginia
- County: Monroe
- Elevation: 2,533 ft (772 m)
- Time zone: UTC-5 (Eastern (EST))
  - Summer (DST): UTC-4 (EDT)
- Area codes: 304 & 681
- GNIS feature ID: 1554558

Glace is an unincorporated community in Monroe County, West Virginia, United States. Glace is 17 miles (27 km) northeast of Union.

== History ==
Glace was named after the blanket of snow, la glace in French, which the founders saw when they arrived at the community.
