= Wikel, West Virginia =

- Unincorporated community
- Location within West Virginia Location within the United States
- Coordinates: 37°30′43″N 80°38′51″W
- Country: United States
- State: West Virginia
- County: Monroe
- Elevation: 2,178 ft (664 m)
- Time zone: UTC-5 (Eastern (EST))
  - Summer (DST): UTC-4 (EDT)
- Area codes: 304 & 681
- GNIS feature ID: 1555982

Wikel is an unincorporated community in Monroe County, West Virginia, United States. Wikel is southwest of Union.

The community most likely was named after the local Wikel (or Wigal) family.
