= Pickaway Rural Historic District =

Historic district in West Virginia, United States

- Pickaway
- U.S. National Register of Historic Places
- U.S. Historic district
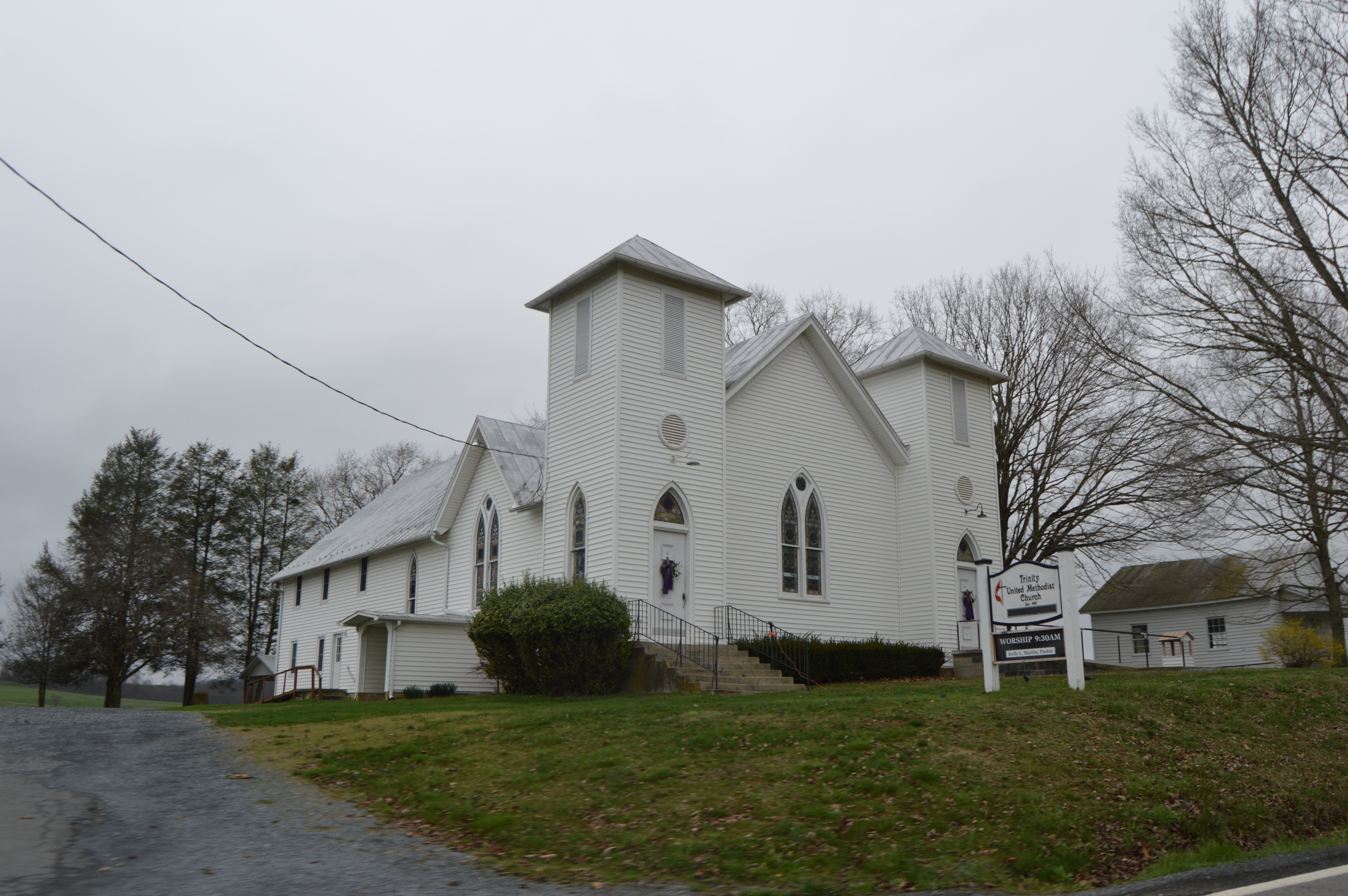
- Trinity United Methodist Church at Pickaway

- Location within West Virginia Location within the United States
- Location: Roughly between U.S. Route 219 and West Virginia Route 3, near Pickaway, West Virginia
- Coordinates: 37°38′5″N 80°30′41″W
- Area: 3,005 acres (1,216 ha)
- Architectural style: Greek Revival, Queen Anne
- NRHP reference No.: 99000290
- Added to NRHP: March 5, 1999

Pickaway Rural Historic District is a national historic district located at Pickaway, near Union, West Virginia, Monroe County, West Virginia. The district includes 126 contributing buildings, 1 contributing sites, and 7 contributing structures centered on Pickaway and surrounding rural areas. Notable properties in the core include the Reverend John Simpson House (1840), Pickaway School (1890), Trinity Methodist Episcopal South Church (1887), Pickaway Store and Post Office (c. 1885), and frame mill and blacksmith shop (c. 1800). Surrounding farms included in the district are the Gilchrist-Pritt-Perrine farms; Overholt-Gilcrist-Pritt and McClung farms; Beckett, Kilcollin, and Lemon farms; and Siebold and Weikle farms.

It was listed on the National Register of Historic Places in 1999.
