= Laurel Branch, West Virginia =

- Unincorporated community
- Location within West Virginia Location within the United States
- Coordinates: 37°31′50″N 80°20′59″W
- Country: United States
- State: West Virginia
- County: Monroe
- Elevation: 2,047 ft (624 m)
- Time zone: UTC-5 (Eastern (EST))
  - Summer (DST): UTC-4 (EDT)
- Area codes: 304 & 681
- GNIS feature ID: 1551697

Laurel Branch is an unincorporated community in Monroe County, West Virginia, United States. Laurel Branch is located near the Virginia border, southeast of Union.
