= Sarton =

Sarton may refer to:

- 8335 Sarton, a minor planet
- Sarton (crater), a crater on the Moon
- Sarton, Pas-de-Calais, a commune of Pas-de-Calais, France
- Sarton, West Virginia, United States
- George Sarton (1884–1956), Belgian-born American chemist and historian
- May Sarton (a.k.a. Eleanore Marie Sarton; 1912–1995), American poet, novelist and memoirist
