= Matthew Wesley Clair =

American minister and newspaper editor

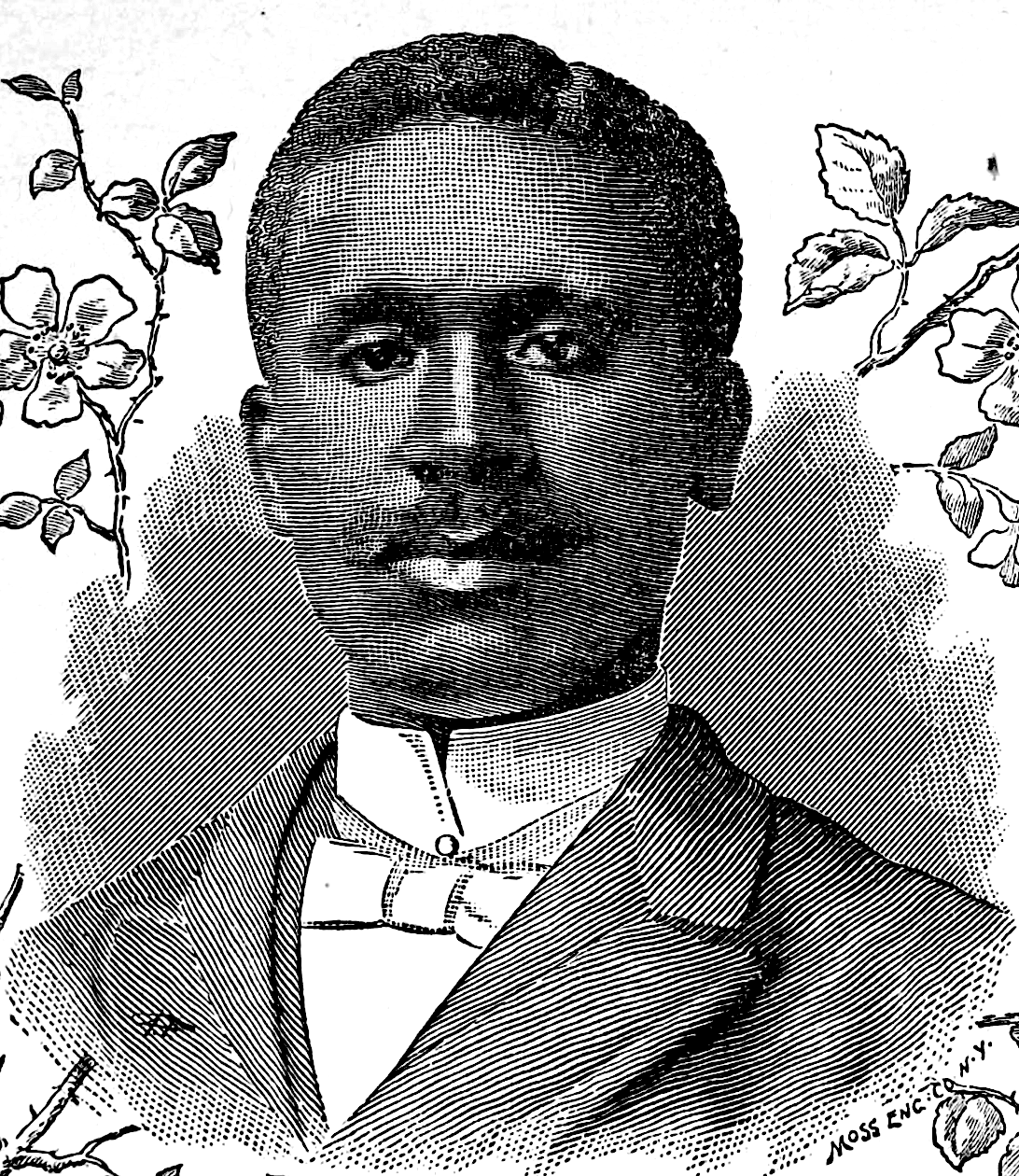
- Born: October 21, 1865; Union, Monroe County, West Virginia, U.S.
- Died: June 28, 1943; Washington, D.C., U.S.
- Other names: Matthew W. Clair, M. W. Clair, M.W. Clair
- Education: Morgan College
- Occupation(s): Minister, newspaper editor
- Spouses: Fannie Meade Walker Clair; Eva F. Wilson
- Children: 5

Matthew Wesley Clair (October 21, 1865 – June 28, 1943) was an American minister, and newspaper editor. He was one of the first African-American bishops in the Methodist Episcopal Church.

== Biography ==
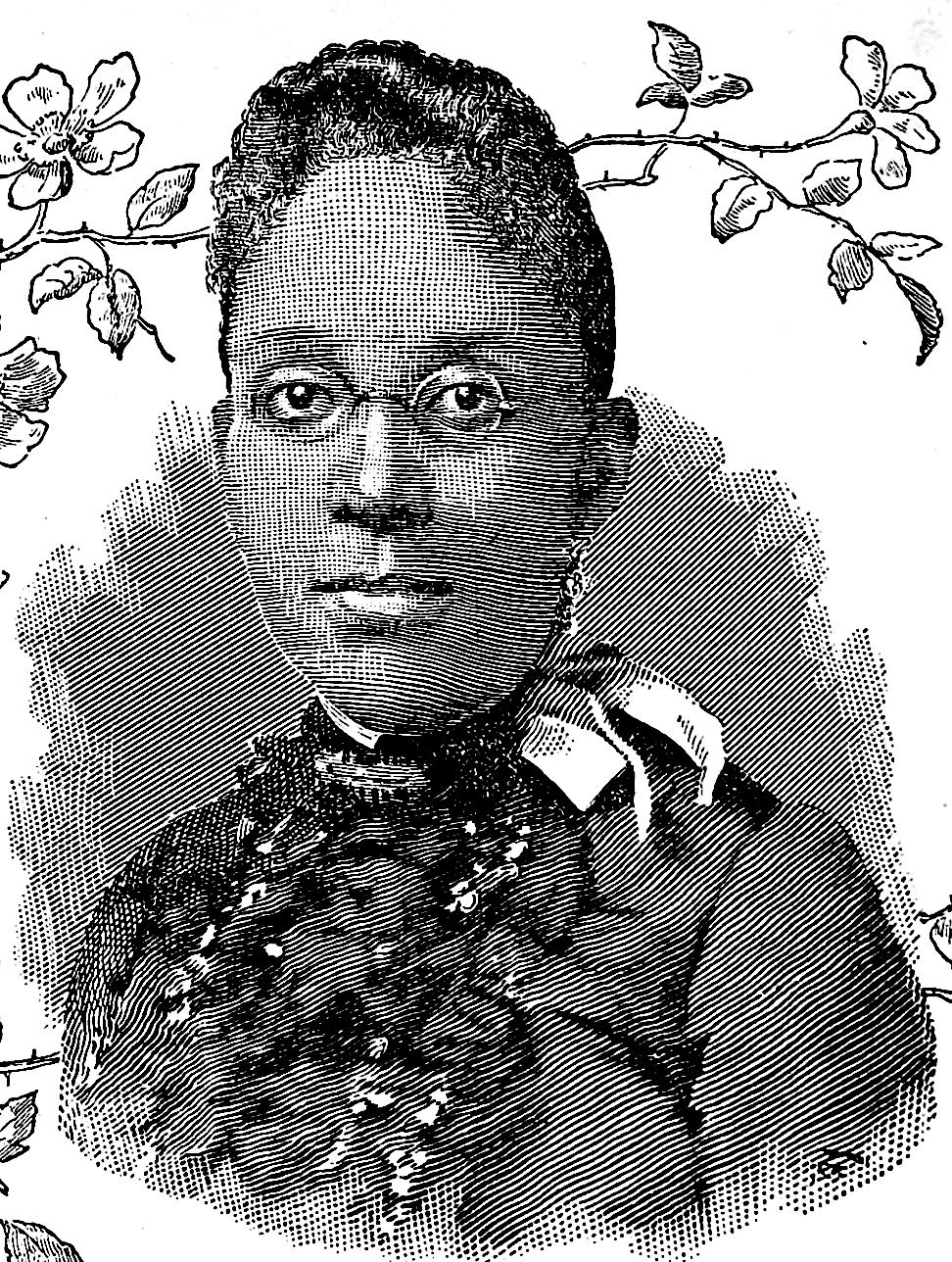
Fannie Meade Walker Clair in 1891

Clair was born on October 21, 1865, in Union, West Virginia. He was a son of Anthony and Ollie (née Green) Clair, both were former slaves. In 1880, Clair joined the Methodist Church.

He attended Morgan College (now Morgan State University) in Baltimore. In 1884, he won the G. V. Leech Prize for theology, and in 1887, he won the Baldwin Prize for English oratory.

Clair and Robert E. Jones were appointed bishops of the Methodist Episcopal Church in 1920, becoming the first black people to receive that title. Clair was assigned to Monrovia, Liberia. Prior to his appointment, he served as District Superintendent for the Church in Washington, D.C.

In 1926, Clair was transferred to Covington, Kentucky. His territory included all of Kentucky and Tennessee. He would serve there until his retirement in 1936.

In March 1890, he edited the newspaper the Methodist Banner. He was assisted by his wife Fannie in the newspaper editing role.

Clair and wife, Fannie Meade Walker, were the parents of five children: including Matthew W. Clair Jr., William O. Clair, and John A. Clair. After Fannie's death in 1925, he married Eva F. Wilson a year later.

== Death ==
In June 1943, Clair travelled to Washington, D.C., to preside over the funeral of his brother. It was there that he died on June 28, 1943.

== See also ==
- List of bishops of the United Methodist Church
- The Afro-American Press and Its Editors
