= Bickett Knob =

Mountain in West Virginia, United States

Coordinates: 37°37′51″N 80°33′55″W

Bickett Knob is a summit in Monroe County, West Virginia, in the United States. With an elevation of 3,327 feet (1,014 m), Bickett Knob is the 231st highest summit in the state of West Virginia.

Bickett Knob was named for the local Bickett family, which settled there.
