= Crimson Springs, West Virginia =

Unincorporated community in West Virginia, United States

- Unincorporated community
- Location within West Virginia Location within the United States
- Coordinates: 37°31′04″N 80°28′54″W
- Country: United States
- State: West Virginia
- County: Monroe
- Elevation: 2,274 ft (693 m)
- Time zone: UTC-5 (Eastern (EST))
  - Summer (DST): UTC-4 (EDT)
- Area codes: 304 & 681
- GNIS feature ID: 1554223

Crimson Springs is an unincorporated community in Monroe County, West Virginia, United States. Crimson Springs is south of Union.
