= Gap Mills, West Virginia =

Unincorporated community in West Virginia, United States

- Unincorporated community
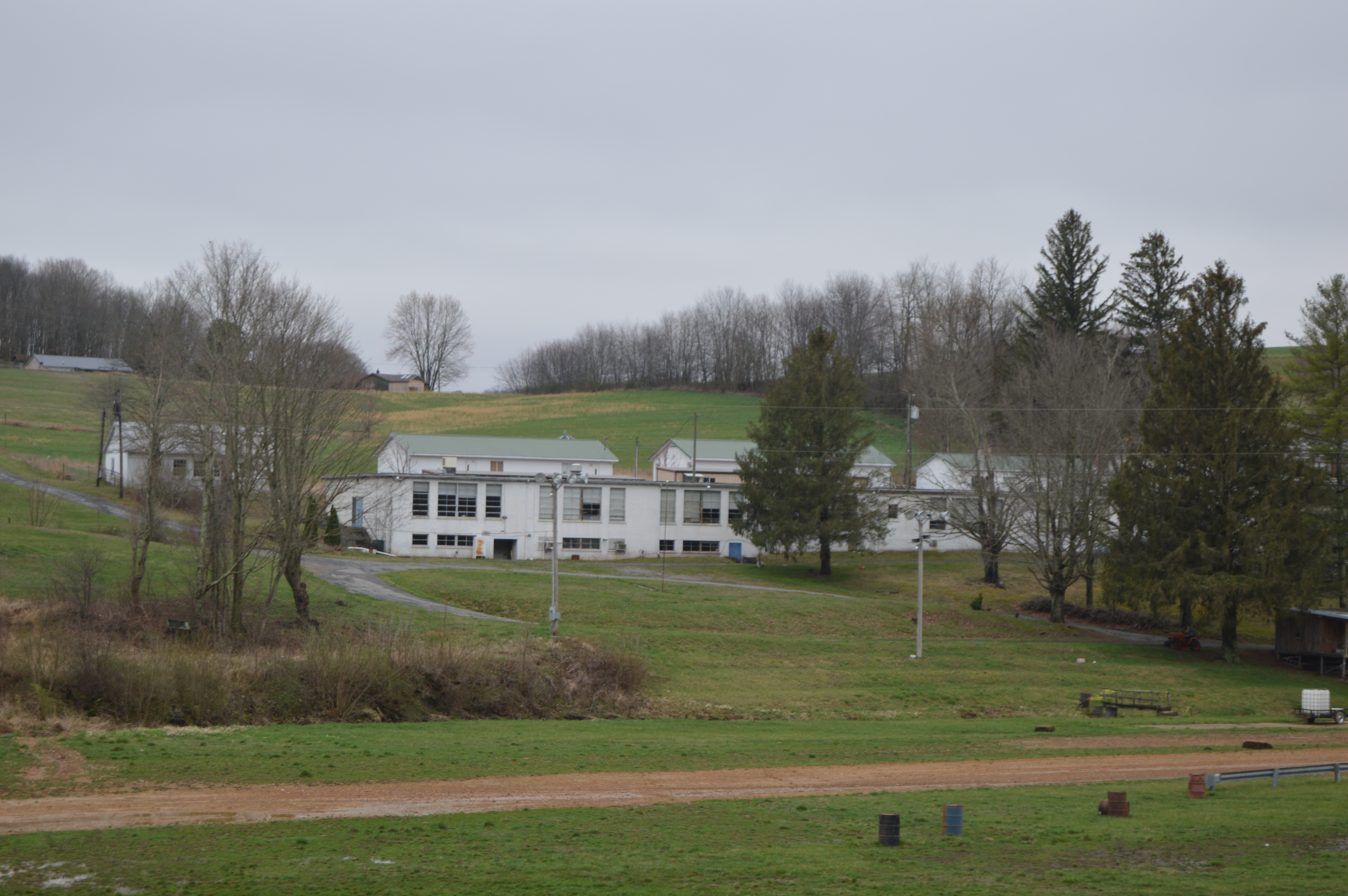
- School

- Location within West Virginia Location within the United States
- Coordinates: 37°33′44″N 80°24′29″W
- Country: United States
- State: West Virginia
- County: Monroe
- Elevation: 2,342 ft (714 m)
- Time zone: UTC-5 (Eastern (EST))
  - Summer (DST): UTC-4 (EDT)
- ZIP code: 24941
- Area codes: 304 & 681
- GNIS feature ID: 1551203

Gap Mills is an unincorporated community in Monroe County, West Virginia, United States. Established in 1775 and located on West Virginia Route 3 east of Union, Gap Mills has a post office with ZIP code 24941.

Fort Henry commander Abraham Wood sent the first recorded English expedition to reach the area in 1671.

The name of the community is a portmanteau of the natural pass, or "gap" in the adjacent Gap Mountain and two grist mills that were once located there.
