= Monitor, West Virginia =

Monitor, West Virginia may refer to the following communities in West Virginia:

- Monitor, Logan County, West Virginia
- Monitor, Monroe County, West Virginia
