= Zenith, West Virginia =

- Unincorporated community
- Location within West Virginia Location within the United States
- Coordinates: 37°30′14″N 80°31′53″W
- Country: United States
- State: West Virginia
- County: Monroe
- Elevation: 2,185 ft (666 m)
- Time zone: UTC-5 (Eastern (EST))
  - Summer (DST): UTC-4 (EDT)
- Area codes: 304 & 681
- GNIS feature ID: 1556045

Zenith is an unincorporated community in Monroe County, West Virginia, United States. Zenith is located near the Virginia border, south of Union.

The community's name is said to be biblical in origin.
