= Bozoo =

Bozoo may refer to:

- Bozoó, a municipality and town located in the province of Burgos, Castile and León, Spain
- Bozoo, West Virginia, an unincorporated community in Monroe County, West Virginia
