= Moncove Lake State Park =

State Park in Monroe County, West Virginia, USA

- IUCN category III (natural monument or feature)
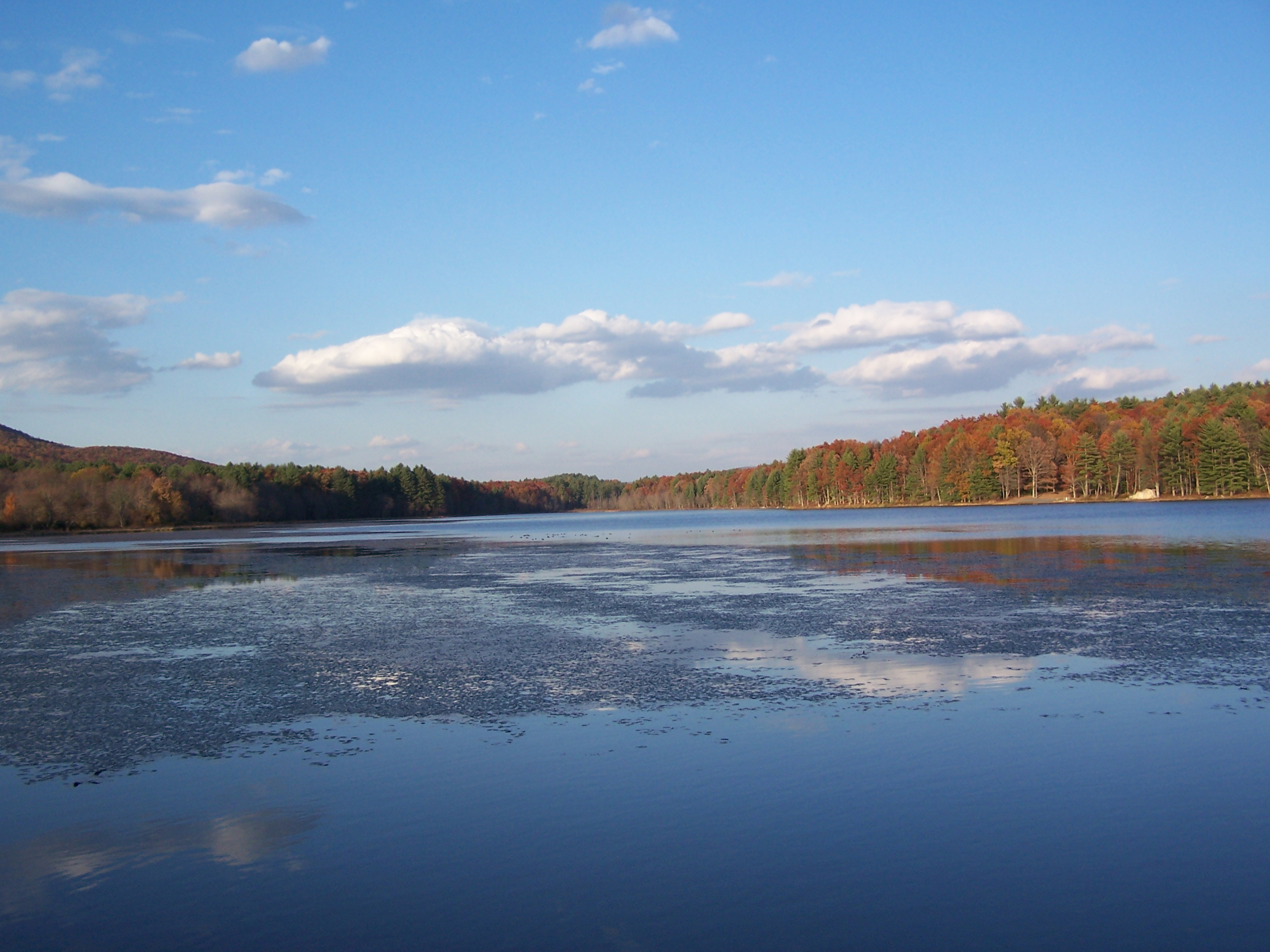
- Moncove Lake

- Location within West Virginia
- Location: Monroe, West Virginia, United States
- Coordinates: 37°37′11″N 80°21′12″W
- Area: 896 acres (363 ha)
- Elevation: 2,582 ft (787 m)
- Established: 1990
- Website: wvstateparks.com/park/moncove-lake-state-park/

Moncove Lake State Park was created in 1990 by setting aside 250 acres (1.0 km^{2}) of the Moncove Lake Wildlife Management Area to be operated as a state park. (The park has since been expanded to 896 acres (3.63 km^{2}).) The park is located near Union in Monroe County, West Virginia. The park sits on the shores of 144-acre (0.58 km^{2}) Moncove Lake, and underneath the flyway of the fall eastern hawk migration. The current park superintendent is John Dempsey, a West Virginia native and life-long resident.

Power boats on Moncove Lake are limited to 5 horsepower (3.7 kW).

== Features ==
- Moncove Lake
- 48 camp sites (25 with electrical hookup)
- Outdoor swimming pool
- Picnic area
- Hunting (in nearby Wildlife Management Area)
- Fishing
- Boating
- Hiking
- Bird watching

== Accessibility ==
Accessibility for the disabled was assessed by West Virginia University. The assessment found the campground, picnic area, lake fishing and swimming pool to be accessible. The 2005 assessment found issues with certain handrails.

== See also ==
- List of West Virginia state parks
- State park
