= Elmhurst, West Virginia =

Unincorporated community in West Virginia, United States

Elmhurst
- Unincorporated community
- Location within the state of West Virginia Elmhurst (the United States)
- Coordinates: 37°38′1″N 80°37′46″W
- Country: United States
- State: West Virginia
- County: Monroe
- Time zone: UTC-5 (Eastern (EST))
  - Summer (DST): UTC-4 (EDT)

Elmhurst is an unincorporated community in Monroe County, West Virginia, United States. It is located along County Route 10.
