= Hollywood, Monroe County, West Virginia =

Hollywood, West Virginia
- Unincorporated community
- Location within West Virginia Location within the United States
- Coordinates: 37°36′44″N 80°26′38″W
- Country: United States
- State: West Virginia
- County: Monroe
- Elevation: 2,172 ft (662 m)
- Time zone: UTC-5 (Eastern (EST))
  - Summer (DST): UTC-4 (EDT)
- Area codes: 304 & 681
- GNIS feature ID: 1551478

Hollywood is an unincorporated community in Monroe County, West Virginia, United States. Hollywood is northeast of Union.

The community was so named on account of holly bushes near the original town site.
