= Sarton, West Virginia =

- Unincorporated community
- Location within West Virginia Location within the United States
- Coordinates: 37°34′57″N 80°38′24″W
- Country: United States
- State: West Virginia
- County: Monroe
- Elevation: 2,421 ft (738 m)
- Time zone: UTC-5 (Eastern (EST))
  - Summer (DST): UTC-4 (EDT)
- Area codes: 304 & 681
- GNIS feature ID: 1555573

Sarton is an unincorporated community in Monroe County, West Virginia, United States. Sarton is west of Union.
