= Monitor, Monroe County, West Virginia =

Monitor, West Virginia
- Unincorporated community
- Location within West Virginia Location within the United States
- Coordinates: 37°39′21″N 80°29′25″W
- Country: United States
- State: West Virginia
- County: Monroe
- Elevation: 2,234 ft (681 m)
- Time zone: UTC-5 (Eastern (EST))
  - Summer (DST): UTC-4 (EDT)
- Area codes: 304 & 681
- GNIS feature ID: 1555148

Monitor is an unincorporated community in Monroe County, West Virginia, United States. Monitor is located on U.S. Route 219, northeast of Union.
