= Wayside, West Virginia =

Wayside
- Unincorporated community
- Location within the state of West Virginia Wayside (the United States)
- Coordinates: 37°35′31″N 80°41′20″W
- Country: United States
- State: West Virginia
- County: Monroe
- Time zone: UTC-5 (Eastern (EST))
  - Summer (DST): UTC-4 (EDT)
- ZIP code: 24985
- Area codes: 304 and 681
- FIPS code: ?
- GNIS feature ID: 1548855

Wayside is an unincorporated community in Monroe County in the U.S. state of West Virginia. It is located along County Route 7 near its juncture with County Route 9. Wayside is the birthplace of Ettie Mae Greene, the oldest person ever in that state.
