= Robert Elijah Jones =

Robert Elijah Jones (February 19, 1872 – May 18, 1960) was an American bishop of the Methodist Episcopal Church and The Methodist Church in the U.S., elected in 1920. Along with Matthew Wesley Clair, Jones was one of the first African-American Bishops of the M.E. Church.

== Biography ==
Robert E. Jones was born on February 19, 1872, in Greensboro, North Carolina.

In 1920, Jones along with Matthew W. Clair became the first black bishops of the Methodist Episcopal Church. However, they were elected on separate ballots and presided over all-black churches. Jones was also the first black to serve as a general superintendent of the entire church. Previously blacks were only allowed to serve in a missionary capacity.

He helped found a Methodist retreat, Gulfside Assembly, in Waveland, Mississippi for African Americans. Gulfside Assembly was the only place in the United States where African Americans had access to the Gulf of Mexico for vacationing and recreational purposes.

In the late 1930s, Bishop Jones participated in a unification movement that attempted to integrate the black and white members of the Methodist Episcopal Church. Unfortunately, because of strong opposition in the South, the Church decided instead to create a separate jurisdiction for blacks, called the Central Jurisdiction. The first General Conference of the new Central Jurisdiction met in St. Louis, Missouri, from June 18 to 23, 1940.

Bishop Jones died on Wednesday, May 18, 1960, in a New Orleans hospital. He was buried at Gulfside Assembly on Monday, May 23, 1960.

The Methodists would not begin formal integration of the black and white churches until the mid-1960s. By 1972, all of the Conferences of the Central Jurisdiction had been merged into white Conferences.

== See also ==
- List of bishops of the United Methodist Church
