= Pickaway, West Virginia =

- Unincorporated community
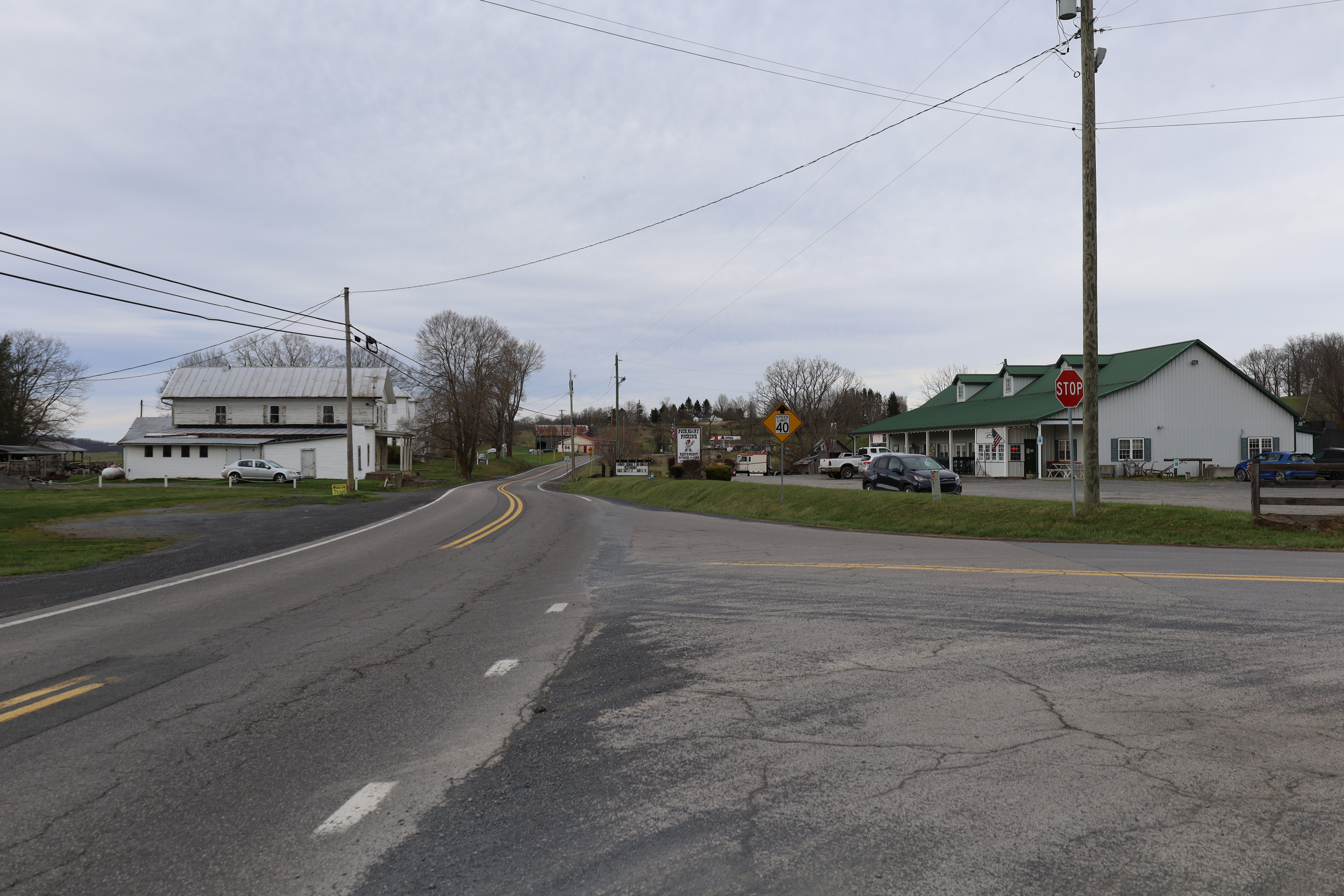
- View along U.S. Route 219 in Pickaway in 2022

- Location within West Virginia Location within the United States
- Coordinates: 37°38′18″N 80°30′22″W
- Country: United States
- State: West Virginia
- County: Monroe
- Elevation: 2,172 ft (662 m)
- Time zone: UTC-5 (Eastern (EST))
  - Summer (DST): UTC-4 (EDT)
- Area codes: 304 & 681
- GNIS feature ID: 1544791

Pickaway is an unincorporated community in Monroe County, West Virginia, United States. Pickaway is located on U.S. Route 219, northeast of Union.

The community was named after Ohio's Pickaway Plains region. The Pickaway Rural Historic District was listed on the National Register of Historic Places in 1999.
