= Necedah (town), Wisconsin =

Town in Juneau County, Wisconsin

Necedah, Wisconsin
- Town
- Town of Necedah
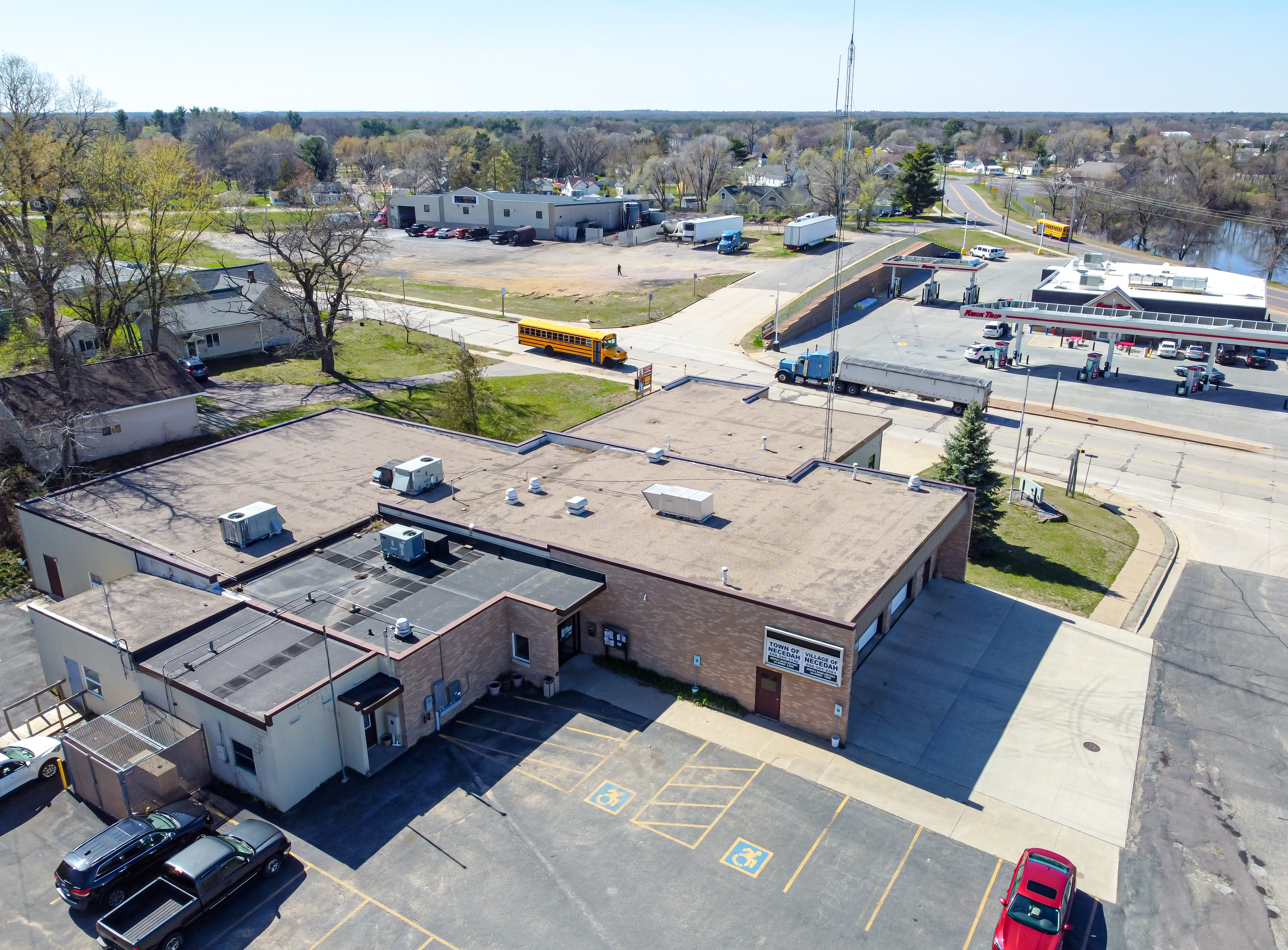
- Necedah Village and Town Halls in one building

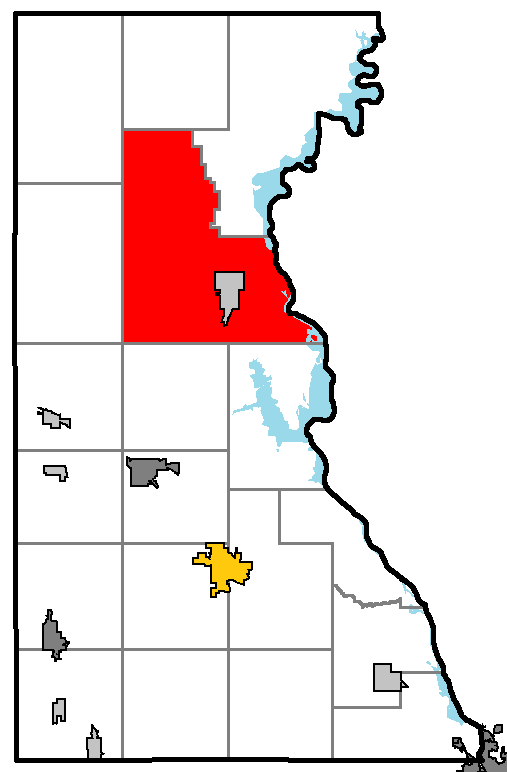
- Location of Necedah, Juneau County

- Location of Juneau County, Wisconsin
- Coordinates: 44°02′37″N 90°06′23″W
- Country: United States
- State: Wisconsin
- County: Juneau

Area
  - Total: 83.18 sq mi (215.4 km^{2})
  - Land: 78.47 sq mi (203.2 km^{2})
  - Water: 4.71 sq mi (12.2 km^{2})

Population (2020)
  - Total: 2,448
  - Density: 31.20/sq mi (12.05/km^{2})
- Time zone: UTC-6 (Central (CST))
  - Summer (DST): UTC-5 (CDT)
- Area code(s): 608 and 353
- GNIS feature ID: 1583783

The Town of Necedah /nəˈsiːdə/ is a town in Juneau County, United States. The population was 2,448 at the 2020 census. The Village of Necedah is located within the town. The unincorporated communities of Cloverdale and Sprague are also located in the town.

== History ==
The name "Necedah" comes from the Ho Chunk peoples who inhabited the area before the arrival of European settlers and means "Land of the Yellow Waters", a reference to the Yellow River.

=== Necedah Shrine ===
In its issue of September 11, 1950 Life magazine reported a gathering of 80,000 on the preceding August 15 at a farm near the town where a local, Mary Ann Van Hoof, had reported seeing a vision of the Virgin Mary.

== Geography ==
According to the United States Census Bureau, the town has a total area of 82.9 square miles (214.6 km^{2}), of which 78.3 square miles (202.8 km^{2}) is land and 4.6 square miles (11.8 km^{2}) (5.5%) is water.

== Demographics ==
As of the census of 2000, there were 2,156 people, 776 households, and 584 families residing in the town. The population density was 27.5 inhabitants per square mile (10.6/km^{2}). There were 1,190 housing units at an average density of 15.2 per square mile (5.9/km^{2}). The racial makeup of the town was 97.63% White, 0.28% Black or African American, 0.28% Native American, 0.28% Asian, 0.56% from other races, and 0.97% from two or more races. 1.21% of the population were Hispanic or Latino of any race.

There were 776 households, out of which 32.6% had children under the age of 18 living with them, 62.9% were married couples living together, 6.8% had a female householder with no husband present, and 24.7% were non-families. 21.5% of all households were made up of individuals, and 9.9% had someone living alone who was 65 years of age or older. The average household size was 2.74 and the average family size was 3.19.

In the town, the population was spread out, with 28.7% under the age of 18, 6% from 18 to 24, 25.1% from 25 to 44, 24.7% from 45 to 64, and 15.6% who were 65 years of age or older. The median age was 38 years. For every 100 females, there were 105.1 males. For every 100 females age 18 and over, there were 108.4 males.

The median income for a household in the town was $34,281, and the median income for a family was $39,135. Males had a median income of $29,655 versus $21,250 for females. The per capita income for the town was $15,013. About 9.7% of families and 10.7% of the population were below the poverty line, including 9.5% of those under age 18 and 9.7% of those age 65 or over.

== Infrastructure ==
Mile Bluff Medical Center hospital in Mauston serves the town.

== Sources ==
- Necedah, Wisconsin - Historical Overview
