= Sprague, Wisconsin =

- Unincorporated community
- Location within Wisconsin Location within the United States
- Coordinates: 44°08′52″N 90°07′53″W
- Country: United States
- State: Wisconsin
- County: Juneau
- Town: Necedah
- Elevation: 942 ft (287 m)
- Time zone: UTC-6 (Central (CST))
  - Summer (DST): UTC-5 (CDT)
- Area code: 608
- GNIS feature ID: 1574578

Sprague is an unincorporated community located in the town of Necedah, Juneau County, Wisconsin, United States. Sprague is located on Wisconsin Highway 80 and the Canadian National Railway, 8.5 miles (13.7 km) north-northwest of the village of Necedah. The community is likely named for John and Gleason Sprague, the owners and publishers of the Mauston Star newspaper in the late 19th century. The post office was established in February 1907 with Michael Anthony as postmaster. The town is located next to the Necedah Wildlife Refuge.
