= Hollywood, Raleigh County, West Virginia =

Hollywood
- Unincorporated community
- Location within the state of West Virginia Hollywood (the United States)
- Coordinates: 37°46′21″N 81°13′25″W
- Country: United States
- State: West Virginia
- County: Raleigh
- Elevation: 2,533 ft (772 m)
- Time zone: UTC-5 (Eastern (EST))
  - Summer (DST): UTC-4 (EDT)
- GNIS ID: 1742790

Hollywood was an unincorporated community located in Raleigh County, West Virginia, United States. Its post office no longer exists. There is also a Hollywood in Monroe County, West Virginia. Hollywood was renamed to MacArthur in 1942. However, it was a distinct mining community with its own coal mines see mine map 336094, located in Beckley. MacArthur used different mines see mine map 335329.
