= Ballengee, West Virginia =

Unincorporated community in West Virginia, United States

- Unincorporated community
- Location within West Virginia Location within the United States
- Coordinates: 37°37′01″N 80°44′17″W
- Country: United States
- State: West Virginia
- Counties: Monroe County and Summers
- Elevation: 1,896 ft (578 m)
- Time zone: UTC-5 (Eastern (EST))
  - Summer (DST): UTC-4 (EDT)
- Area codes: 304 & 681
- GNIS feature ID: 1553791

Ballengee is an unincorporated community in Monroe and Summers counties, West Virginia, United States. Ballengee is about 15 miles (24 km) southwest of Alderson.

== History ==
Ballengee (formerly Ballangee) is named for R. T. Ballangee, an early settler.
