= Cornelia Storrs Adair =

American educator (1884–1962)

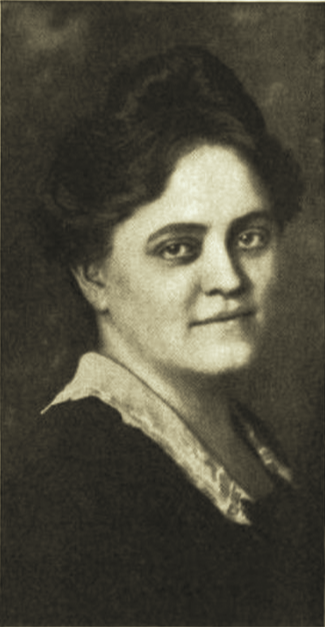
- Cornelia Storrs Adair, from a 1921 publication
- Born: November 9, 1884; Red Sulphur Springs, West Virginia, U.S.
- Died: April 14, 1962 (aged 77)
- Occupations: Educator, school administrator, clubwoman

Cornelia Storrs Adair (November 9, 1884–April 14, 1962) was an educator and the first classroom teacher elected to serve as president (1927–1928) of the National Education Association.

== Early life and education ==
Adair was born in Red Sulphur Springs, West Virginia, the daughter of Lewis Cass Adair and Rebecca Sidney Taylor Adair. Adair graduated from Richmond (Virginia) High School. For 15 years beginning in 1904 she taught at Elba, Nicholson, Robert Fulton, and Bellevue elementary schools. She enrolled in the College of William and Mary in 1921 and graduated with an A.B. degree in 1923. She was later awarded a doctor of pedagogy from the New York State Teachers College.

== Career ==
Adair taught at Bainbridge Junior High School, and then moved to Franklin Elementary School as their principal in 1931.

Outside the classroom Adair served on a variety of state and national educational organizations. including leading the committee on teacher retirement of the Virginia Education Association. In 1925 she was a delegate to the first biennial conference of the World Federation of Education Associations in Edinburgh, Scotland. Adair was the head of the teacher's association in Richmond, served as chair of the education program at the League of Women Voters, and started volunteering in the National Education Association first at the state level.

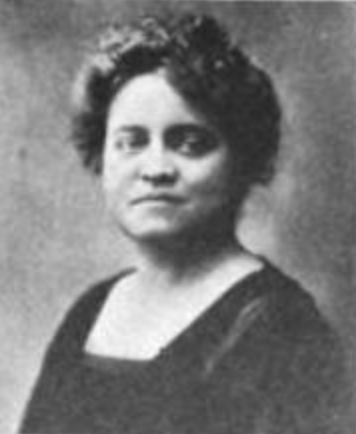
Adair, from a 1926 publication

In 1927, Adair was named president of the National Education Association, thereby becoming the first classroom teacher to be named president. She took a leave of absence from her teaching duties in the year she was serving as president.

Adair also served as the lead for the federal government's Works Progress Administration Emergency Education Program in Richmond, Virginia.

She retired in 1954, and she died on April 14, 1962.

== Honors and awards ==
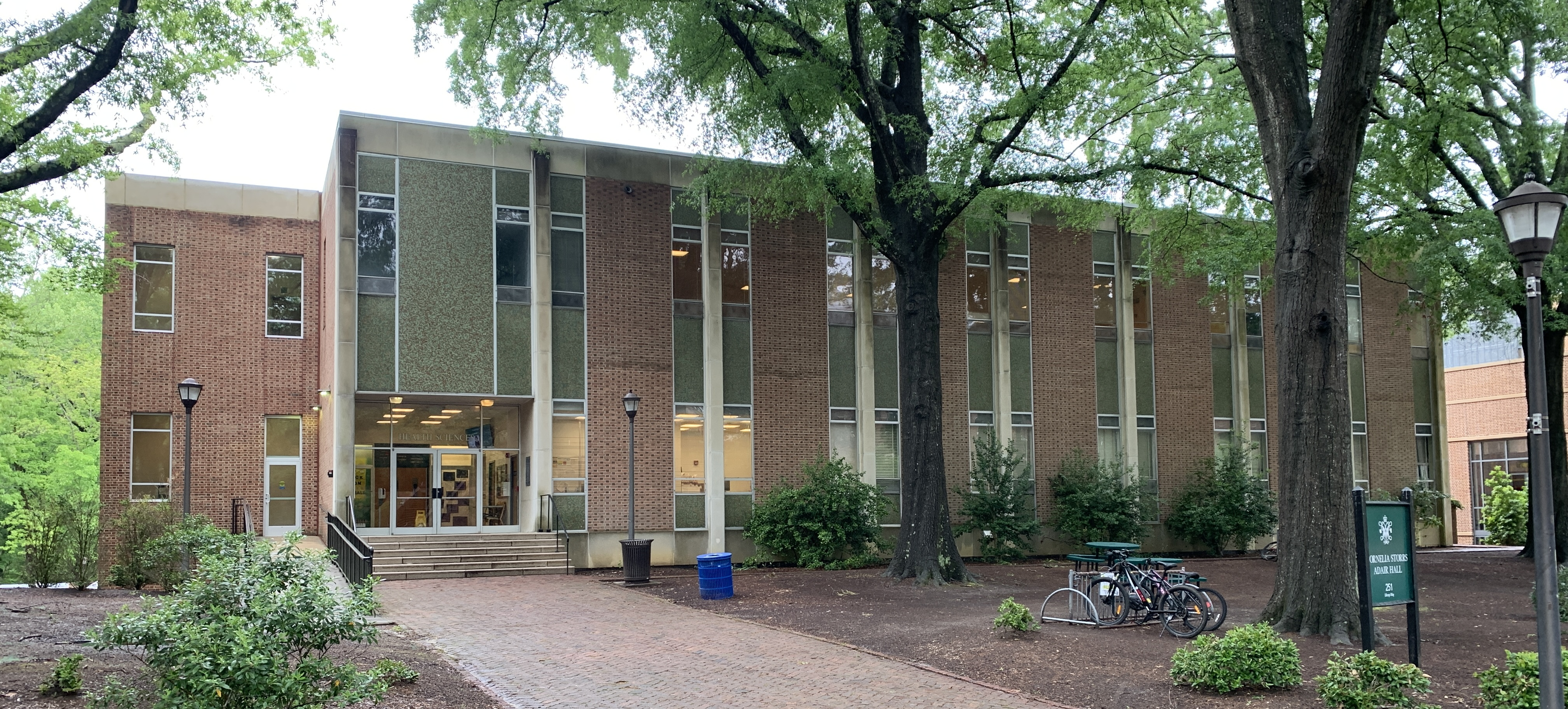
Adair Hall, seen in 2023

The College of William and Mary awarded her their Alumni Medallion in 1934, making her the first woman to receive this honor; in 1963 they further honored Adair by naming the gymnasium the Cornelia Storrs Adair Gymnasium.
