= Cloverdale Corporation =

Cloverdale Corporation has for 29 years been involved in publishing scholarly research for the scientific community. Under its publishing imprint, Wyndham Hall Press, the Cloverdale Corporation published the Rhodes-Fulbright International Library for twenty years and added some 600 scholarly titles in the social, behavioral, and physical sciences during that time.

The winner of the coveted American Library Association's Choice Magazine Academic Book of the Year Award in 1995, Cloverdale Corporation went on to receive five consecutive annual endorsements from both the Ford Foundation and the National Research Council as a leader in publishing first-book academic authors.

The Cloverdale Corporation continues in this tradition as a publisher of academic and professional authors. It maintains the scholarly rigor in the imprint Cloverdale Books, of which authors possess an advanced degree in their field and use the text as course material for their Academic appointment. Other professional authors writing books not necessarily for academic use are published under the imprint of Quill Books.

Cloverdale operates in the United States. The company's headquarters are located in South Bend, Indiana.
