= Red Sulphur Springs Hotel =

Coordinates: 37.5135°N 80.7651°W

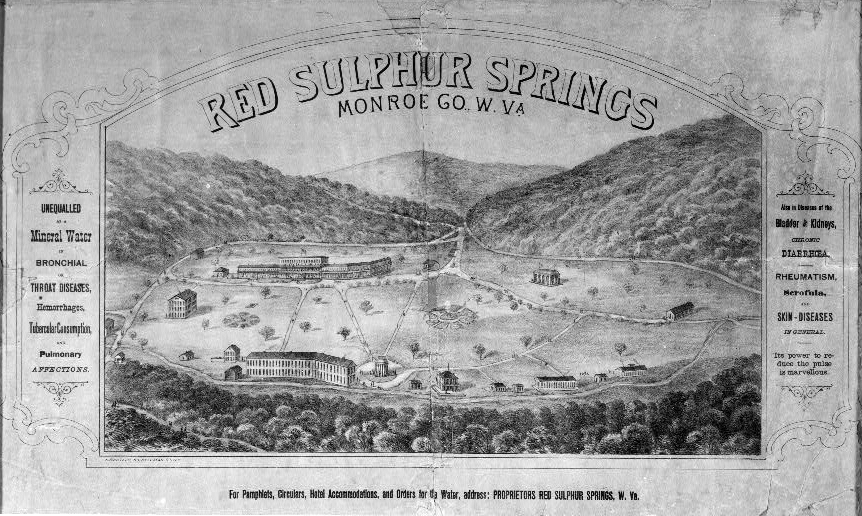
Red Sulphur Springs flyer, late 19th century

The Red Sulphur Springs Hotel was a spring resort in Red Sulphur Springs, West Virginia. It held a social event every evening. When residents died there, to avoid compromising its reputation, bodies were secretly taken to a cemetery about two miles away, where many of the grave markers have no name. The hotel opened in 1832 and closed in 1917; the last event held there was a dance. At one time Martin Van Buren, the president of the United States, visited the hotel, which was once owned by Levi Morton, Vice President under Benjamin Harrison. After its closure in 1917, the hotel was dismantled and only a small, concrete base remains where the pavilion once stood.

== Sources ==
- Red Sulphur Springs, Monroe County, Virginia By William Burke
- The Red Sulphur Springs; Minister Morton's Hotel in the Happy Valley
- Around the Red Sulphur; The Virginia Mountains and Their People.
- "Summer Letters.; Letter-Links between New-York and Virginia". The New York Times.
- Summer Letters.; Letter-Links between New-York and Virginia.
