= Gulfside United Methodist Assembly =

Methodist retreat in Waveland, Mississippi

Coordinates: 30.266251°N 89.393020°W

Gulfside Assembly is a Methodist retreat located in Waveland, Mississippi. It was founded to provide spiritual, educational and recreational facilities to African Americans who were denied access elsewhere because of segregation. Incorporated in 1924, it is today recognized as a historic site by the State of Mississippi.

== Background ==
In the early part of the 20th century, the Methodist Episcopal Church, South, was strictly segregated along racial lines, mirroring American society. Since most hotels, restaurants, beaches and other public facilities were established for Whites only, African Americans had few, if any, places where they could go for recreation.

Robert E. Jones, the first African American bishop of the Methodist Episcopal Church, was speaking at Lakeside Assembly, a White Methodist campground in Ohio, when he came up with the idea to establish a similar place for African Americans to congregate in a relaxed atmosphere. The next step was to secure a location within his own district which included West Texas, Louisiana, and Mississippi. Waveland, Mississippi was a resort town, centrally located on the Gulf Coast, 55 miles (89 km) from Bishop Jones’ main office in New Orleans. Through the aid of churches and individuals, Bishop Jones raised approximately $4,000 to purchase land in Waveland. He bought 300 acres (1.2 km^{2}) and leased 316 acres (1.28 km^{2}) from the state.

== The early years ==
The Gulfside Chautauqua and camp meeting ground was physically realized on April 16, 1923. Its founder, Bishop Jones, was the first Black to be a general superintendent of the Methodist Episcopal Church. Gulfside was incorporated on January 24, 1924. The incorporators were some of the most prestigious Black leaders in Methodism at that time.

There was only one building standing on the whole of the 616 acres (2.49 km^{2}). It was called the Jackson House because it had once housed family members of President Andrew Jackson. It was a magnificent old mansion with very large rooms filled with antique furniture. The structure could not be seen from the beach. Large oak trees surrounded the house hiding it from view. The edifice stood some 8 to 10 feet (3.0 m) above the ground. The first floor had a wraparound porch that was wide enough to be used for meetings.

Bishop Jones marshaled his force of 14 preachers and local craft workers and set about putting the deteriorated structure into a livable condition. The open area under the porch was eventually closed in to become a kitchen, dining room and sweet shop. A screened in pavilion with dirt floor was built where meetings could be held. There was a makeshift dirt road leading to the Jackson House area. But when it rained, the road flooded and turned to mud., so most people walked the three miles (5 km) through the woods from the train station to the Jackson House.

Until Gulfside, there were no accommodations of any kind for any person of color along the entire Gulf Coast. There was no place a person of color could use the beaches or swim.

In the first two decades, under the leadership of Bishop Jones, Gulfside blossomed into a pivotal point of the New Orleans area and the surrounding region. In the early days, events at Gulfside took place in the spring and summer months from April through August. Some of the activities included the Young Men's Christian Association, Conference Summer School for Town and Country Pastors, Summer School of Theology for aspiring ministers, Boys' Camp and Girls' Reserves, 4-H, and Scouting events, and picnics sponsored by groups throughout the region. The summer events culminated with Bishop Jones’ Area Council Meeting. The only activity that spanned the entire year during Gulfside's early years was a Poor Boys' school. This was probably the first and most significant program that Bishop Jones instituted at Gulfside. Dr. J. H. Graham puts it in his book, Black United Methodist Retrospect and Prospect: "This school enables deprived functional illiterates to develop salable skills. Several have gone on and entered the Christian ministry." They studied regular text books as in any public school and they learned crafts. The boys had to work from 9 to 12 and after [lunch] would go to class until 4 p.m.

Bishop Jones’ tenure at Gulfside, which spanned the Great Depression, was speckled with threats of foreclosure. But Gulfside always managed to meet payment. Pennies were collected, philanthropists courted, and lots sold from the 300 acres (1.2 km^{2}) that had been bought. There was also the prejudice of the times. There were instances of cross burning on several occasions. One winter morning in the 1940s, the Jackson House mysteriously caught fire. Some blamed it on The Poor Boys' School, others on Whites. After the fire, the 1947 Fort Lauderdale Hurricane finished the Jackson House, as well as other buildings on the purchased land.

From 1940 to 1944, Bishop William A. C. Hughes carried on the good work of Bishop Jones at Gulfside. In 1944, Bishop Robert N. Brooks became administrator of Gulfside. Bishop Brooks was called "Mr. Methodist" because of his superb knowledge of doctrine. Under his leadership, a board of trustees was formed so that the burden of Gulfside did not rest with just one person. Bishop Brooks encouraged people to give dollars instead of pennies. Over a period of eight years, Brooks Chapel, Gulfside Inn, Harry Hoosier Auditorium, and the Bishop's house were built. These buildings were reinforced concrete block constructions, better able to withstand fire and hurricane than the frame buildings had been. The blocks were made on site using a machine that made the blocks one at a time. Under Bishop Brooks’ leadership, Gulfside continued to be the focal point for "training. It provided a place for youth retreats, jurisdictional meetings, and leadership training enterprises." It was a place where Blacks and Whites could come together with much less questioning from the local authorities than would have taken place elsewhere in the South.

By the 1950s there were wooden summer cottages as well as two one story dorms to house young people from the "Y-Teens" and other organizations. The pine forest on the back part of the grounds contained a complete camp ground with half log and half screen cabins, and a large cooking and dining pavilion.

== Notable events ==
Some notable activities that took place at Gulfside include the following:

- Constance Baker Motley used Gulfside as her base of operations during the court sessions to integrate the University of Mississippi Law School.
- Thurgood Marshall came there to work with other NAACP lawyers.
- Leontyne Price sang there because it was one of the few places where she could sing opera to her own people in the South.

== The effects of unification ==
Progress at Gulfside was slowed in 1968 with the formation of The United Methodist Church. Then Black Methodists were finally accepted on an equal footing by White Methodists. But, as was the case with some other Black institutions, integration hurt rather than helped Gulfside. The segregated, all-Black Central jurisdiction, created with Northern and Southern church union in 1939, was disbanded. The Black membership was integrated into the existing White conferences and Gulfside ceased to serve as the core meeting place for Black Methodists. During the civil rights movement of the 1960s, Gulfside served as a meeting place for the region. Civil rights activist, Hollis Watkins, of Jackson, Mississippi says: "there were only three places where Blacks could meet in Mississippi during the movement—Toogaloo College, Rust College, and Gulfside.

== Impact of natural disasters ==
In 1969, Hurricane Camille struck destroying 26 buildings on the grounds. That massive destruction and the fact that Blacks could now go to other conference centers diminished the interest in and need for Gulfside. This ultimately meant that Gulfside's services had to expand so that the center could support itself, it could no longer depend on Methodism as its sole support.

After the hurricane, there was talk of selling Gulfside and dividing the proceeds among the 12 Black Methodist Episcopal colleges. But those efforts were laid to rest by Bishop Mack B. Stokes. Bishop Ernest T. Dixon, and laymen Wayne Calbert, Henry Harper, and others came together in an effort to revitalize Gulfside. These leaders worked tirelessly to preserve what they knew was an African-American treasure. The fruit of their labor could be seen in the newly renovated, modern facility. With the support of the General Board of Global Ministries’ National Division, included in the complex was the construction of the cottages for adults known as Dixon Village. These buildings were made possible by the Harry E. Kendall Fund (from the Health and Welfare Ministries Program Department of the United Methodist Church. In August 2005 Hurricane Katrina struck the Gulf Coast. Gulfside Assembly was totally destroyed. All that remained was a historic marker and a small burial ground where Bishop Jones, his wife Elizabeth, and Bishop Brooks are buried.

== Rebuilding efforts ==
As of April 2006 Gulfside is still serving the needs of people in Waveland and Bay Saint Louis and all along the Mississippi Coast. Community Aid Relief Effort (CARE) has set up a work center at Gulfside. Their work teams spread out along the Gulf Coast helping to rebuild the damaged communities.

== Legacy ==
Gulfside has been recognized by both the United Methodist Church and the State of Mississippi as a historic site. The history of Gulfside is recounted in the book, The Land Was Ours: African American Beaches from Jim Crow to the Sunbelt South, by Andrew W. Kahrl.
