= Bozoo, West Virginia =

Unincorporated community in West Virginia, United States

- Unincorporated community
- Location within West Virginia Location within the United States
- Coordinates: 37°27′46″N 80°49′20″W
- Country: United States
- State: West Virginia
- County: Monroe
- Elevation: 2,218 ft (676 m)
- Time zone: UTC-5 (Eastern (EST))
  - Summer (DST): UTC-4 (EDT)
- ZIP code: 24923
- Area codes: 304 & 681
- GNIS feature ID: 1550436

Bozoo is an unincorporated community in Monroe County, West Virginia, United States. Bozoo is north of Peterstown.

The community's name may be a corruption of the name Boisseau.

Bozoo is a popular location for rock climbing, with both bouldering and roped climbing.
