= Cloverdale (Washington, D.C.) =

Historic house in Washington, D.C., United States

- U.S. National Register of Historic Places
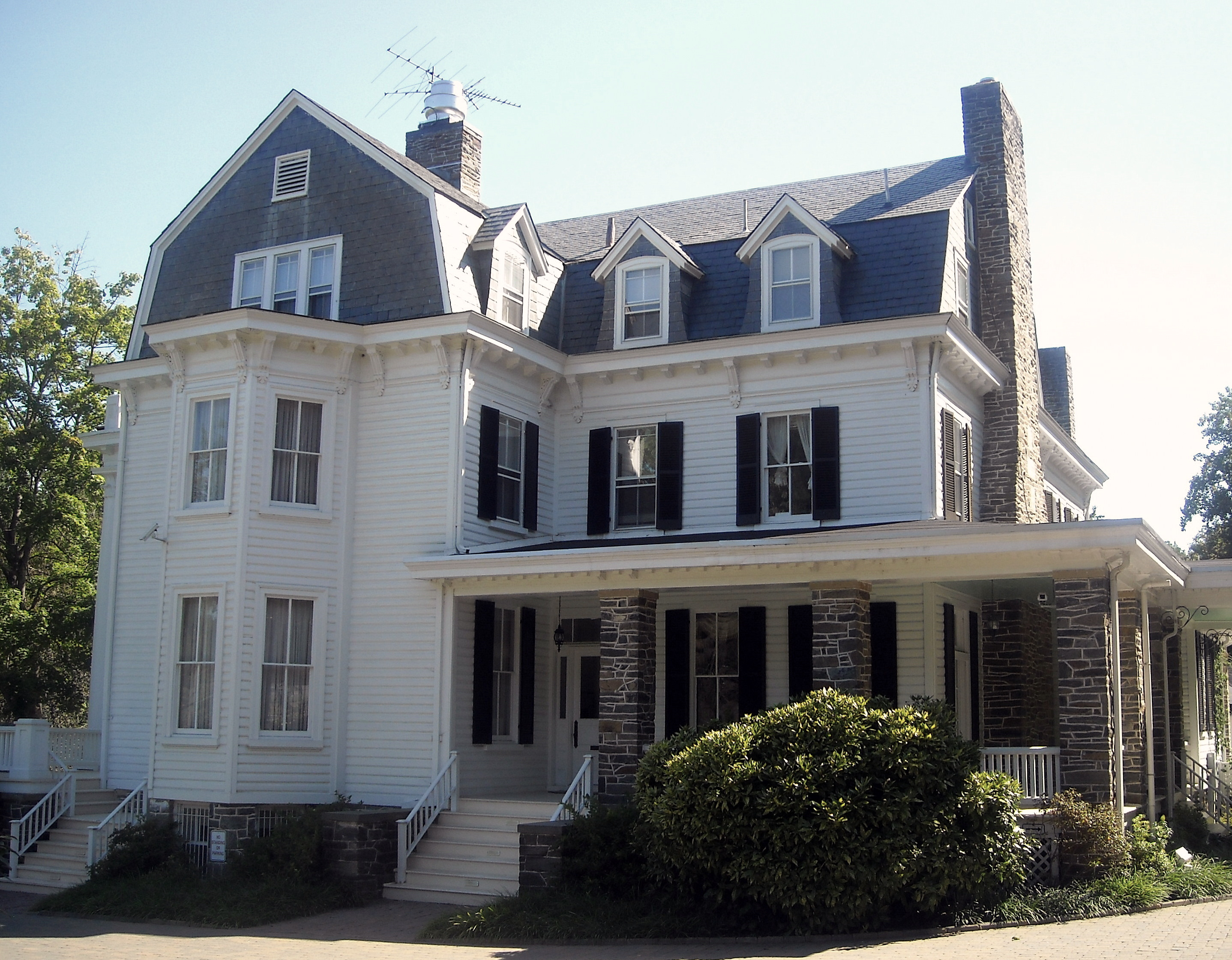
- Cloverdale in 2008

- Location within District of Columbia
- Location: 2600 and 2608 Tilden Street, N.W. Washington, D.C.
- Coordinates: 38°56′25″N 77°3′16″W
- Built: 1910
- Architectural style: Colonial Revival
- NRHP reference No.: 90001115
- Added to NRHP: August 9, 1990

Cloverdale, also known as Pierce Shoemaker House, is an historic Colonial Revival home, located at 2600 and 2608 Tilden Street in the Forest Hills neighborhood of Northwest, Washington, D.C., United States. It is now the Education Office of the Chinese Embassy.

== History ==
The Colonial Revival house was constructed in 1810, before being renovated in 1876, and again in 1910. It passed from the family of Isaac Peirce to his nephew Pierce Shoemaker, who expanded the house in 1876. Clara Newman reportedly remodeled it in 1910.

It is listed on the National Register of Historic Places.
