= Cloverdale, Wisconsin =

- Unincorporated community
- Location within Wisconsin Location within the United States
- Coordinates: 44°01′30″N 90°10′44″W
- Country: United States
- State: Wisconsin
- County: Jefferson
- Town: Necedah
- Elevation: 919 ft (280 m)
- Time zone: UTC-6 (Central (CST))
  - Summer (DST): UTC-5 (CDT)
- Area code: 608
- GNIS feature ID: 1577548

Cloverdale is an unincorporated community located in the town of Necedah, Juneau County, Wisconsin, United States.

== History ==
A post office called Cloverdale was established in 1912, and remained in operation until it was discontinued in 1947. The name Cloverdale is descriptive.
