= Rehoboth Church =

Historic church in West Virginia, United States

- U.S. National Register of Historic Places
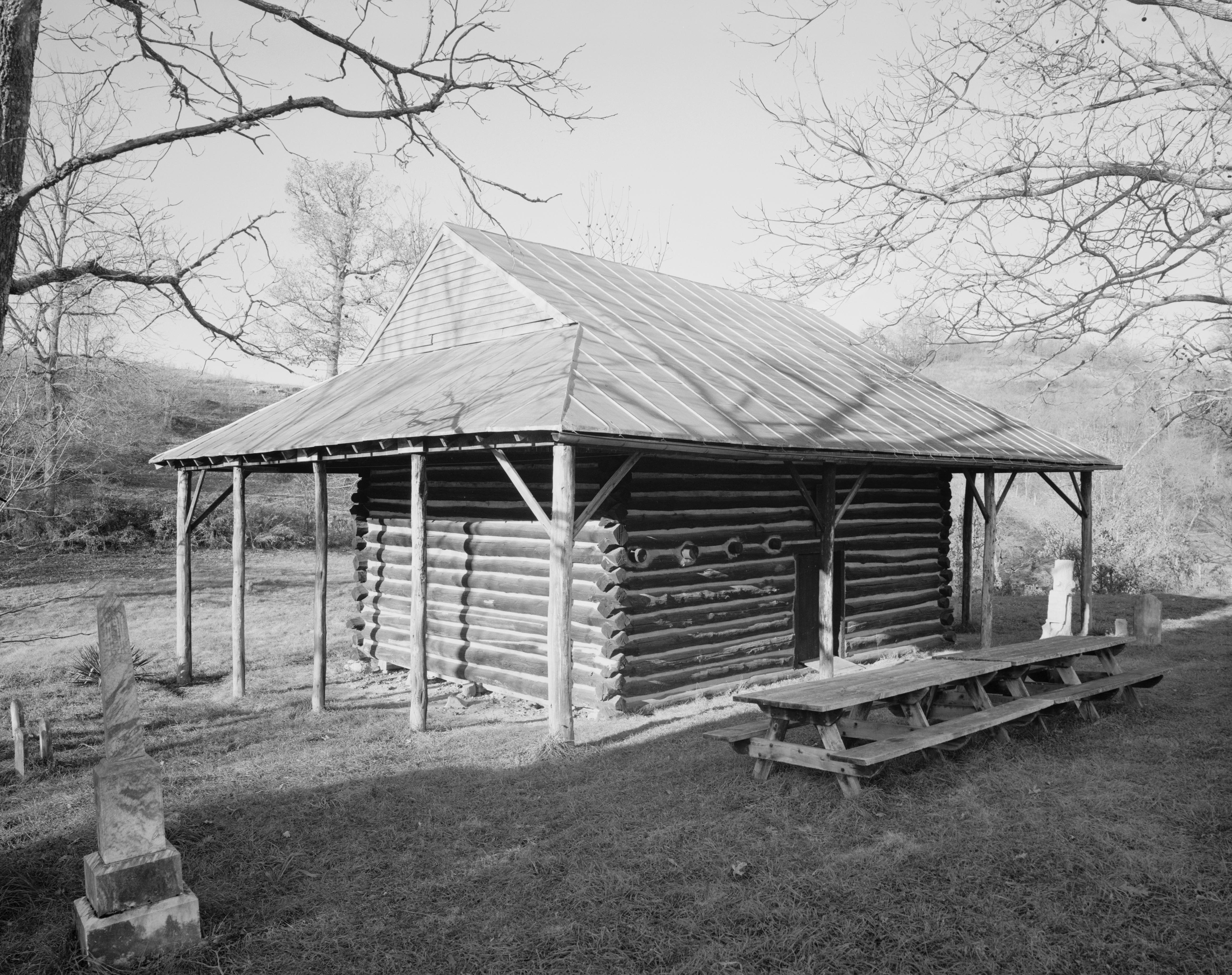
- Exterior of the church

- Location within West Virginia Location within the United States
- Nearest city: Union, West Virginia
- Coordinates: 37°35′24″N 80°30′24″W
- Built: 1786
- Architect: Edward Keenan
- NRHP reference No.: 74002016
- Added to NRHP: December 31, 1974

Rehoboth Church is a historic log cabin-style Methodist church in the countryside of Monroe County, West Virginia, United States, 2 miles (3¼ km) east of the town of Union. Listed on the National Register of Historic Places since 1974, it is the oldest existing church building in West Virginia.

== Early history ==
Newly arrived pioneers organized a Methodist church in the vicinity of Union in late 1784. Working together, they built the church in 1785 on the land of Edward Keenan, who had been a leading part of the construction effort. Keenan donated the land both for the church and for its graveyard.

The building was dedicated in 1786 by Francis Asbury, the first Methodist bishop in the United States. After its construction, the church was a center of Methodism: Asbury returned at least three times in the next ten years to lead Annual Conferences at the church.

== Architecture ==
Rehoboth Church is a vernacular structure, designed using the log framing construction techniques utilized by early settlers in the western reaches of the Virginia Colony. The interior of the church is dominated by the raised pulpit, fashioned from planed timber which allows maximum visibility to both the nave and the galleries. Three sides of the church are lined with galleries which offer additional seating (used as a slave gallery during the antebellum period). A steep fixed ladder in the southwest corner of the nave provides access to the galleries, which are supported by two massive log pillars and small braces set in the side and rear walls of the church. The logs are shaped to a diamond at their ends. Aside from the pulpit, the only furnishings in the church are the pews, crudely constructed from half-sawn logs, and wooden lamp stands. The altar from the church, believed to have been used by Bishop Asbury, is preserved as well.

== Preservation ==
Built simply of logs hewn from the forest, Rehoboth Church naturally deteriorated as the years passed. Restoration efforts began in 1927, when the entire structure was repaired. By 1930, continuing efforts had seen the erection of a firm shelter for the building: while the original roof was left in place, a large tin roof was set over the entire structure. It has since been recognized by a Methodist church history society, being named a National Methodist Shrine for its place as the most westerly church remaining in its region of the United States built before the Constitution was implemented and the only such church in West Virginia. By the early 1960s, the building was still in sturdy condition, and it was even used periodically for worship services. It was added to the National Register of Historic Places on December 31, 1974. Today, a small museum stands on the site near the church.

== See also ==
- List of the oldest churches in the United States
- List of the oldest buildings in West Virginia
