= Cloverdale Historic District =

Historic district in Alabama, United States

- U.S. National Register of Historic Places
- U.S. Historic district
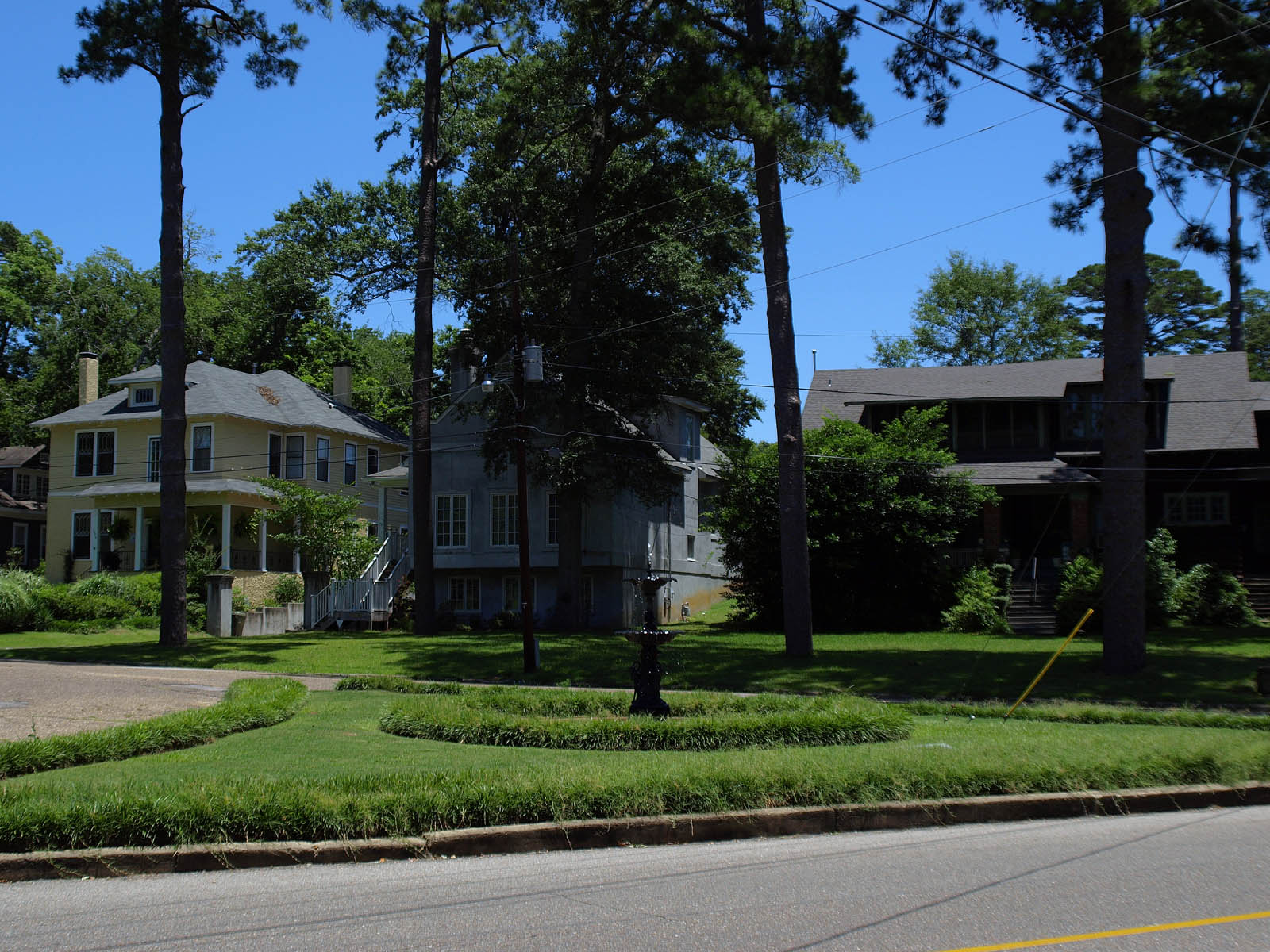
- Houses along Galena Avenue in the Cloverdale Historic District

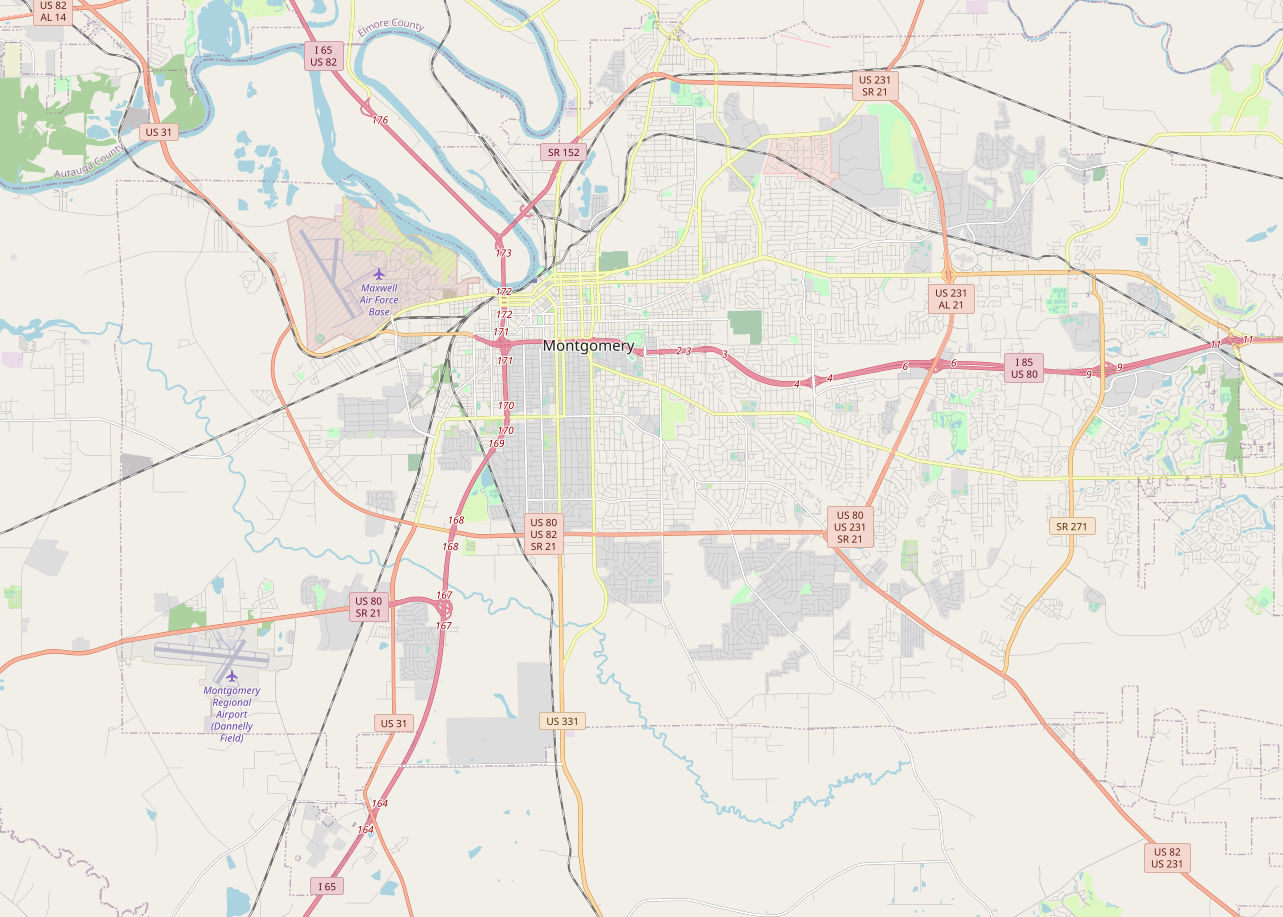
- Location within Montgomery, Alabama Location within Alabama Location within the United States
- Location: Roughly bounded by Norman Bridge & Cloverdale Rd., Fairview & Felder Aves. and Boultier St., Montgomery, Alabama
- Coordinates: 32°21′18″N 86°17′42″W
- Area: 156 acres (63 ha)
- Architectural style: Mid 19th Century Revival, Late 19th And Early 20th Century American Movements, Late 19th And 20th Century Revivals
- NRHP reference No.: 85002161
- Added to NRHP: September 12, 1985

The Cloverdale Historic District is a 156-acre (63 ha) historic district in Montgomery, Alabama. It is roughly bounded by Norman Bridge and Cloverdale roads, Fairview and Felder avenues, and Boultier Street. It contains 463 contributing buildings and four structures that date from the mid-19th to the early 20th centuries. The district was placed on the National Register of Historic Places on September 12, 1985.
