= Cloverdale, Pleasants County, West Virginia =

Unincorporated community in West Virginia, United States

Cloverdale, West Virginia
- Unincorporated community
- Location within West Virginia Location within the United States
- Coordinates: 39°21′54″N 81°08′35″W
- Country: United States
- State: West Virginia
- County: Pleasants
- Elevation: 1,070 ft (330 m)
- Time zone: UTC-5 (Eastern (EST))
  - Summer (DST): UTC-4 (EDT)
- Area codes: 304 & 681
- GNIS feature ID: 1678504

Cloverdale (also known as Cloverdale Church and Gibson) is an unincorporated community in Pleasants County, West Virginia, United States. Cloverdale is located on West Virginia Route 16, 4 miles (6.4 km) east-southeast of St. Marys.
