= Red Sulphur Springs, West Virginia =

Red Sulphur Springs
- Unincorporated community
- Location within the state of West Virginia Red Sulphur Springs (the United States)
- Coordinates: 37°30′49″N 80°45′54″W
- Country: United States
- State: West Virginia
- County: Monroe
- Time zone: UTC-5 (Eastern (EST))
  - Summer (DST): UTC-4 (EDT)

Red Sulphur Springs is an unincorporated community in Monroe County, West Virginia, United States. It once boasted the Red Sulphur Springs Hotel. Red Sulphur Springs is located on West Virginia Route 12, close to Indian Creek.

== History ==
Red Sulphur Springs was known as a watering place from 1800. The springs were purchased by Dr. William Burke of Richmond in 1830, who built a hotel to accommodate up to 350 guests. Among the notable guests to the springs were Chief Justice of the Supreme Court Roger Taney and Francis Scott Key. The resort was disrupted by the Civil War. Ownership passed to Levi Morton, who had been Vice-President of the United States under Benjamin Harrison. He expanded the hotel, but the resort eventually failed. It was sold during World War I and divided into parcels, and the buildings demolished.

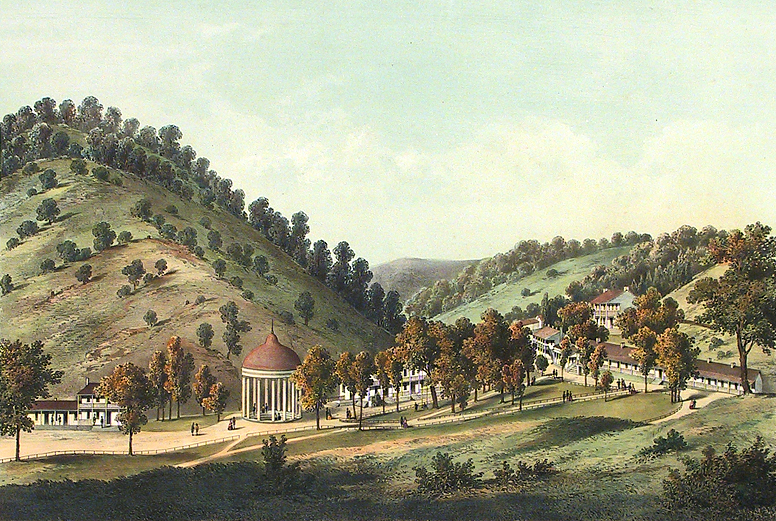
Resort at Red Sulphur Springs as depicted by Edward Beyer in his Album of Virginia

== Notable people ==
- Cornelia Storrs Adair, educator, first classroom teacher to serve as president of the National Education Association
- Christopher Payne, U.S. consul to St. Thomas
