= Monroe County, West Virginia =

County in West Virginia, United States

Monroe County
- County
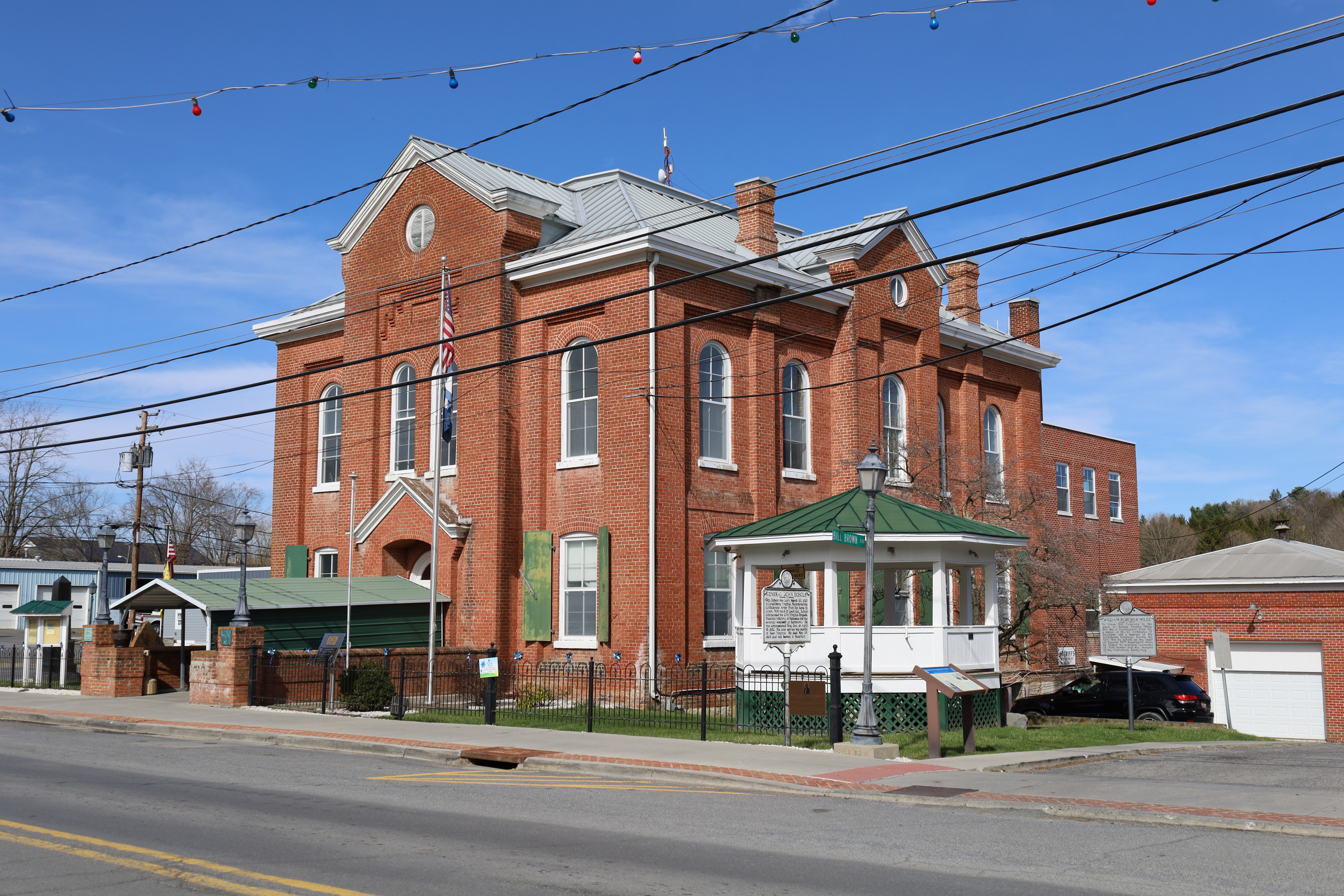
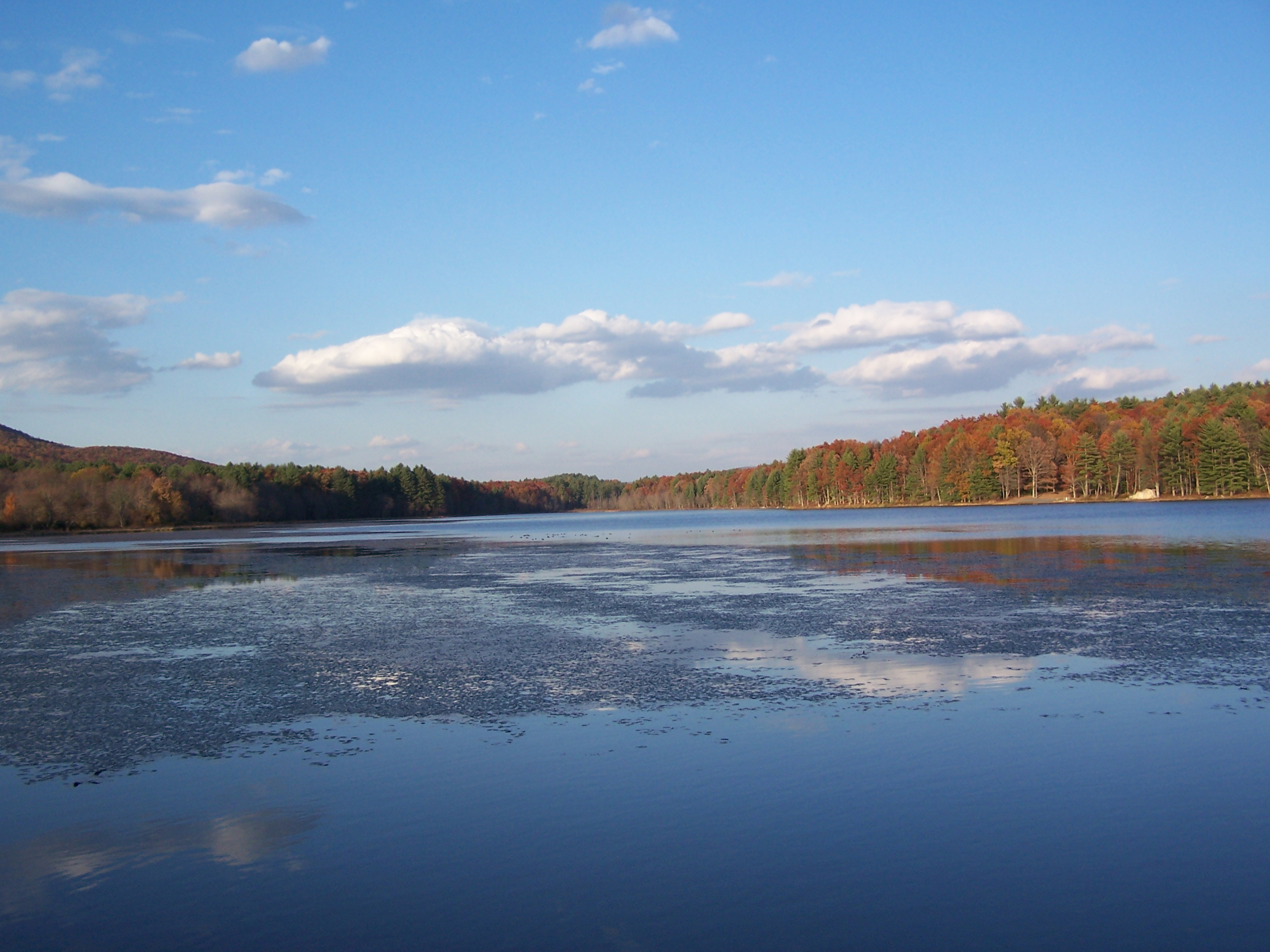
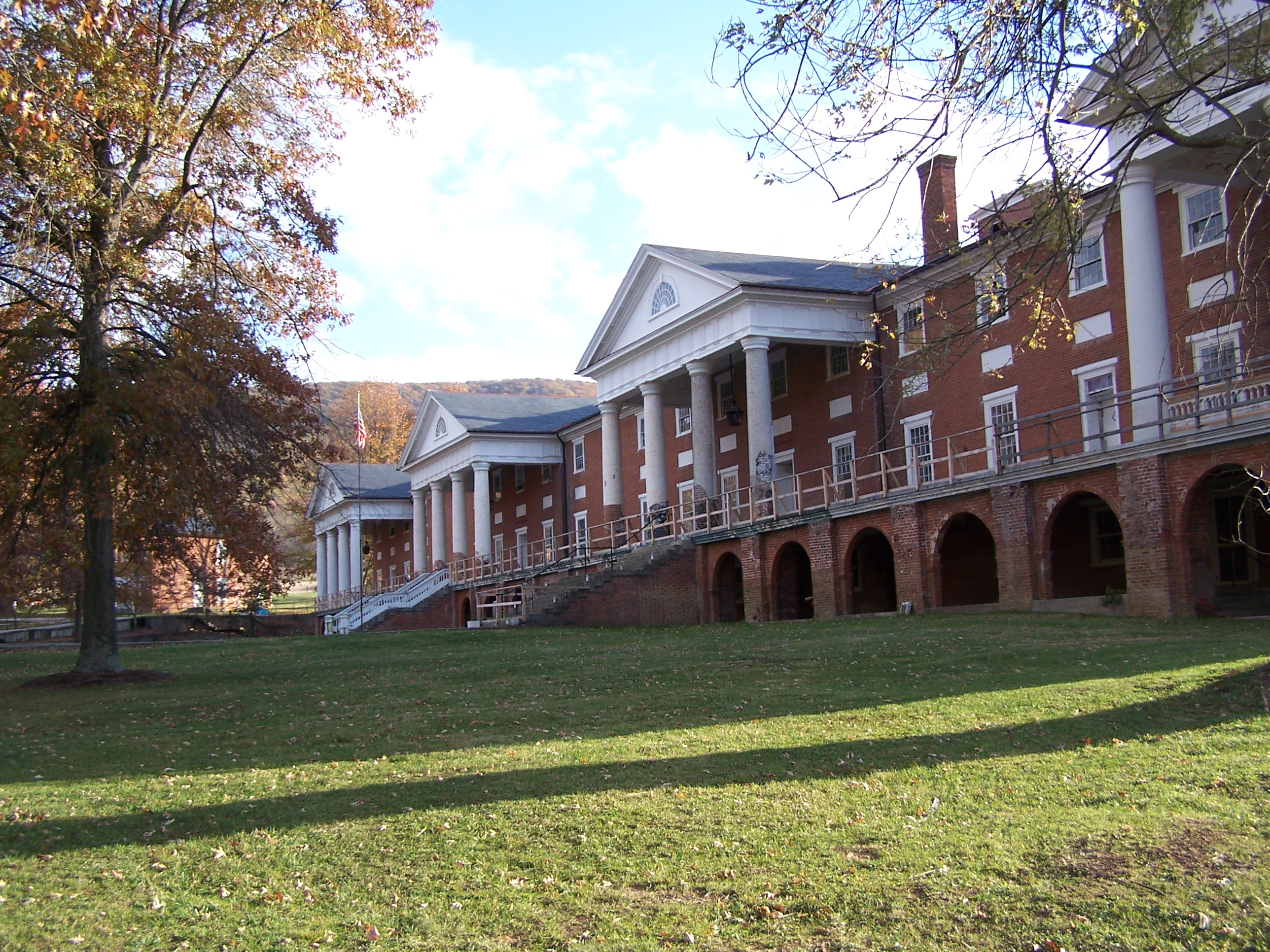
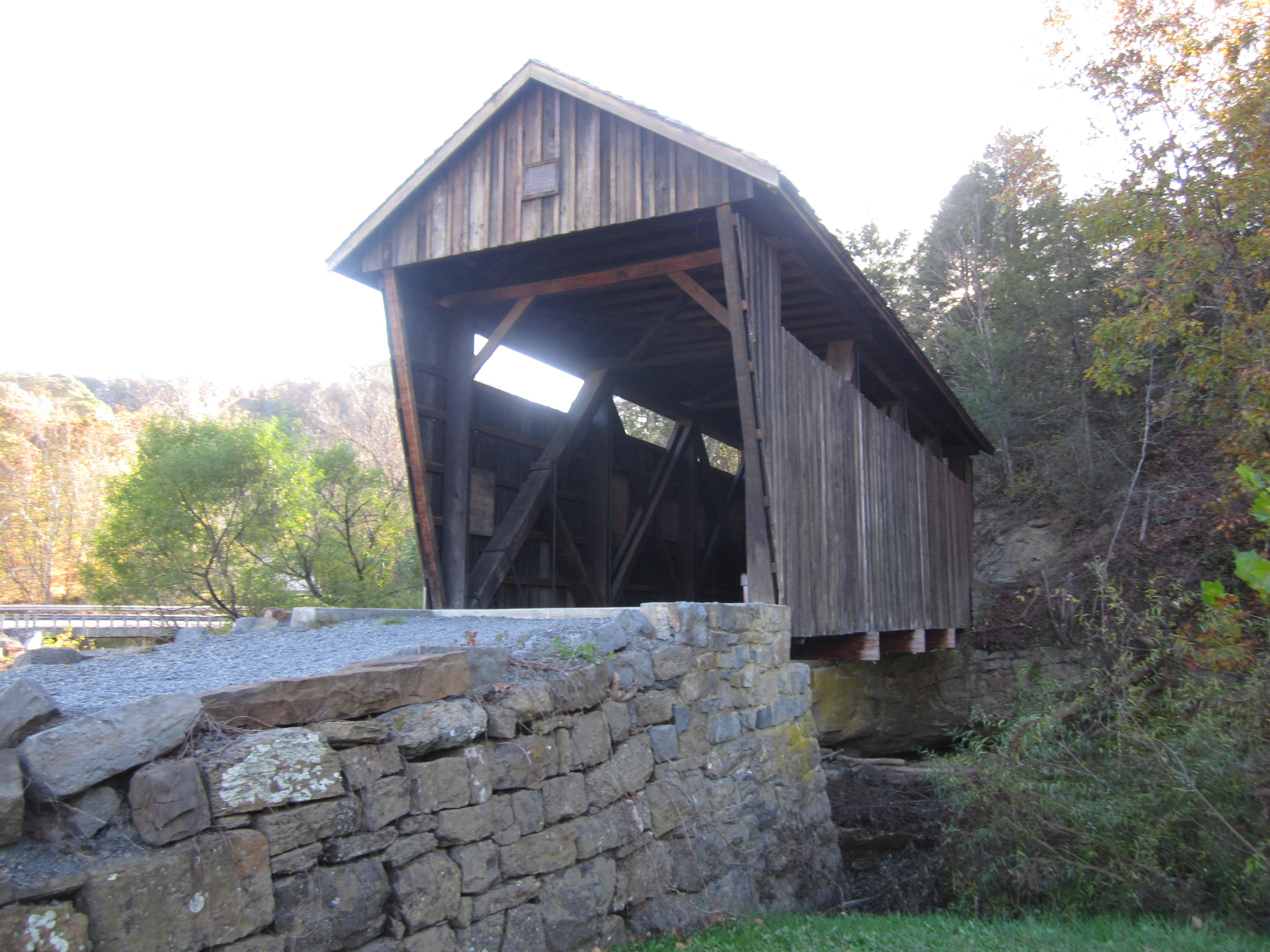
- Monroe County Courthouse in Union Moncove Lake State Park Main Building at Sweet Springs Resort, designed by Thomas Jefferson. Indian Creek Covered Bridge Cook's Mill

- Seal

- Location of Monroe County in West Virginia

- West Virginia's location within the U.S.
- Country: United States
- State: West Virginia
- Founded: January 14, 1799
- Named for: James Monroe
- Seat: Union
- Largest town: Peterstown

Government
  - County Commission President: Kevin Galford
  - County Commission: Kevin Mann; Melvin Young

Area
  - Total: 474 sq mi (1,230 km^{2})
  - Land: 473 sq mi (1,230 km^{2})
  - Water: 0.9 sq mi (2.3 km^{2}) 0.2%
  - Rank: 20th

Population (2020)
  - Total: 12,376
  - Estimate (2025): 12,491 ▲
  - Rank: 34th
  - Density: 26.2/sq mi (10.1/km^{2})
- Time zone: UTC−5 (Eastern)
  - Summer (DST): UTC−4 (EDT)
- Area codes: 304, 681
- Congressional district: 1st
- Senate district: 10th
- House of Delegates district: 40th, 47th
- Website: https://www.monroecountywv.gov/

Monroe County is a county in the U.S. state of West Virginia. As of the 2020 census, the population was 12,376. Its county seat is Union.

Monroe County was the home of Andrew Summers Rowan, a soldier in the Spanish–American War commemorated in Elbert Hubbard's essay "A Message to Garcia."

In 1928 the Jones Diamond was found lying on the ground here by two men pitching horseshoes. It is the largest alluvial diamond ever found in North America.

== History ==
Monroe County was created from Greenbrier County on January 14, 1799, and was named for Virginia civic figure James Monroe, who would be elected fifth President of the United States in November 1816. It was one of fifty Virginia counties that were admitted to the Union as the state of West Virginia on June 20, 1863, at the height of the Civil War. Monroe County did not participate in the creation of the new state, but was included by Congressional decree. Almost all the men from Monroe who served in the Civil War enlisted in the Confederate army.

In 1863, West Virginia's counties were divided into civil townships, with the intention of encouraging local government. This proved impractical in the heavily rural state, and in 1872 the townships were converted into magisterial districts. Monroe County was initially divided into seven townships: Forest Hill, Red Sulphur, Second Creek, Springfield, Sweet Springs, Union, and Wolf Creek. In 1871, part of Forest Hill Township was added to the new county of Summers, and the remaining territory distributed between Red Sulphur and Springfield Townships. The following year, the six remaining townships became magisterial districts. Except for minor adjustments, the six historic magisterial districts were unchanged until the 1990s, when they were consolidated into three new districts: Central, Eastern, and Western.

== Geography ==
Monroe County lies on the southeast side of West Virginia. Its southeast border abuts the northwest border of the state of Virginia. The New River flows northward for a short distance along the county's southwest border. The county's terrain is mountainous and tree-covered, with all sufficiently level surfaces devoted to agriculture. The terrain slopes to the north and west, with its highest part the middle part of its border with Virginia, at 3,862 ft (1,177 m) ASL. The county has a total area of 474 square miles (1,230 km^{2}), of which 473 square miles (1,230 km^{2}) is land and 0.9 square miles (2.3 km^{2}) (0.2%) is water.

=== Major highways ===
- U.S. Highway 219
- West Virginia Route 3
- West Virginia Route 12
- West Virginia Route 122
- West Virginia Route 311

=== Adjacent counties ===
- Greenbrier County (north)
- Alleghany County, Virginia (northeast)
- Craig County, Virginia (east)
- Giles County, Virginia (south)
- Summers County (west)

=== Watersheds ===
Tributaries of the James River, part of the Chesapeake Bay

- Potts Creek

Tributaries of the New River

- Greenbrier River
- Indian Creek

Tributaries of the Greenbrier River

- Second Creek
- Sinks Grove

=== National Natural Landmark ===
- Greenville Saltpeter Cave

=== National protected areas ===
- George Washington National Forest
- Jefferson National Forest In 2018 a natural gas pipeline project entered the Jefferson National Forest.

== Demographics ==
Historical population
Census	Pop.	Note	%±
1800	4,188		—
1810	5,444		30.0%
1820	6,620		21.6%
1830	7,798		17.8%
1840	8,422		8.0%
1850	10,204		21.2%
1860	10,757		5.4%
1870	11,124		3.4%
1880	11,501		3.4%
1890	12,429		8.1%
1900	13,130		5.6%
1910	13,055		−0.6%
1920	13,141		0.7%
1930	11,949		−9.1%
1940	13,577		13.6%
1950	13,123		−3.3%
1960	11,584		−11.7%
1970	11,272		−2.7%
1980	12,873		14.2%
1990	12,406		−3.6%
2000	14,583		17.5%
2010	13,502		−7.4%
2020	12,376		−8.3%
2025 (est.)	12,491	▲	0.9%
US Decennial Census; 1790–1960 1900–1990; 1990–2000 2010–2020, 2023

=== 2020 census ===
As of the 2020 census, the county had a population of 12,376. Of the residents, 20.0% were under the age of 18 and 24.6% were 65 years of age or older; the median age was 47.7 years. For every 100 females there were 99.2 males, and for every 100 females age 18 and over there were 97.7 males.

The racial makeup of the county was 95.1% White, 0.9% Black or African American, 0.2% American Indian and Alaska Native, 0.1% Asian, 0.4% from some other race, and 3.2% from two or more races. Hispanic or Latino residents of any race comprised 0.8% of the population.

There were 5,130 households in the county, of which 25.7% had children under the age of 18 living with them and 22.8% had a female householder with no spouse or partner present. About 27.8% of all households were made up of individuals and 15.4% had someone living alone who was 65 years of age or older.

There were 6,219 housing units, of which 17.5% were vacant. Among occupied housing units, 82.5% were owner-occupied and 17.5% were renter-occupied. The homeowner vacancy rate was 1.7% and the rental vacancy rate was 6.6%.

Monroe County, West Virginia – Racial and ethnic composition Note: the US Census treats Hispanic/Latino as an ethnic category. This table excludes Latinos from the racial categories and assigns them to a separate category. Hispanics/Latinos may be of any race.
Race / Ethnicity (NH = Non-Hispanic)	Pop 2000	Pop 2010	Pop 2020	% 2000	% 2010	% 2020
White alone (NH)	13,448	13,110	11,739	92.22%	97.10%	94.85%
Black or African American alone (NH)	868	89	113	5.95%	0.66%	0.91%
Native American or Alaska Native alone (NH)	33	26	26	0.23%	0.19%	0.21%
Asian alone (NH)	23	15	11	0.16%	0.11%	0.09%
Pacific Islander alone (NH)	2	3	0	0.01%	0.02%	0.00%
Other race alone (NH)	4	10	30	0.03%	0.07%	0.24%
Mixed race or Multiracial (NH)	133	166	363	0.91%	1.23%	2.93%
Hispanic or Latino (any race)	72	83	94	0.49%	0.61%	0.76%
Total	14,583	13,502	12,376	100.00%	100.00%	100.00%

=== 2010 census ===
As of the census of 2010, there were 13,502 people, 5,655 households, and 3,915 families in the county. The population density was 28.5 people per square mile (11.0 people/km^{2}). There were 7,601 housing units at an average density of 16.1 units per square mile (6.2 units/km^{2}). The racial makeup of the county was 97.5% white, 0.7% black or African American, 0.2% American Indian, 0.1% Asian, 0.2% from other races, and 1.3% from two or more races. Those of Hispanic or Latino origin made up 0.6% of the population. In terms of ancestry, 19.5% were Irish, 16.7% were English, 16.3% were German, 10.4% were American, and 5.7% were Scotch-Irish.

Of the 5,655 households, 27.4% had children under the age of 18 living with them, 55.7% were married couples living together, 9.3% had a female householder with no husband present, 30.8% were non-families, and 26.9% of all households were made up of individuals. The average household size was 2.38 and the average family size was 2.85. The median age was 45.0 years.

The median income for a household in the county was $39,574 and the median income for a family was $45,106. Males had a median income of $35,709 versus $23,782 for females. The per capita income for the county was $18,927. About 10.3% of families and 13.3% of the population were below the poverty line, including 18.1% of those under age 18 and 5.4% of those age 65 or over.

=== 2000 census ===
As of the census of 2000, there were 14,583 people, 5,447 households, and 3,883 families in the county. The population density was 30.8 people per square mile (11.9 people/km^{2}). There were 7,267 housing units at an average density of 15.4 units per square mile (5.9 units/km^{2}). The racial makeup of the county was 92.67% White, 5.98% Black or African American, 0.23% Native American, 0.16% Asian, 0.01% Pacific Islander, 0.03% from other races, and 0.92% from two or more races. 0.49% of the population were Hispanic or Latino of any race.

There were 5,447 households, out of which 29.00% had children under the age of 18 living with them, 59.80% were married couples living together, 7.90% had a female householder with no husband present, and 28.70% were non-families. 25.80% of all households were made up of individuals, and 13.10% had someone living alone who was 65 years of age or older. The average household size was 2.41 and the average family size was 2.88.

The county population contained 20.10% under the age of 18, 8.10% from 18 to 24, 30.30% from 25 to 44, 26.10% from 45 to 64, and 15.40% who were 65 years of age or older. The median age was 40 years. For every 100 females there were 79.70 males. For every 100 females age 18 and over, there were 73.80 males.

The median income for a household in the county was $27,575, and the median income for a family was $35,299. Males had a median income of $25,643 versus $22,104 for females. The per capita income for the county was $17,435. About 12.60% of families and 16.20% of the population were below the poverty line, including 21.30% of those under age 18 and 12.30% of those age 65 or over.

== Politics ==
Monroe County was strongly pro-Confederate during the Virginia Secession Convention. It voted Democratic consistently up until voting for William McKinley in 1900, but since then has leaned Republican except during Democratic landslides, and like all of West Virginia has become overwhelmingly Republican in the twenty-first century due to declining unionization and differences with the Democratic Party's views on social issues.

United States presidential election results for Monroe County, West Virginia
Year	Republican		Democratic		Third party(ies)	
Year	No.	%	No.	%	No.	%
1912	798	25.52%	1,570	50.21%	759	24.27%
1916	1,584	49.48%	1,609	50.27%	8	0.25%
1920	3,001	54.25%	2,519	45.54%	12	0.22%
1924	2,713	49.96%	2,686	49.47%	31	0.57%
1928	3,025	56.14%	2,346	43.54%	17	0.32%
1932	2,978	47.67%	3,267	52.30%	2	0.03%
1936	3,268	48.81%	3,413	50.98%	14	0.21%
1940	3,403	50.90%	3,283	49.10%	0	0.00%
1944	3,130	54.48%	2,615	45.52%	0	0.00%
1948	2,956	52.90%	2,632	47.10%	0	0.00%
1952	3,447	54.69%	2,856	45.31%	0	0.00%
1956	3,529	56.01%	2,772	43.99%	0	0.00%
1960	3,139	51.89%	2,910	48.11%	0	0.00%
1964	2,385	41.46%	3,367	58.54%	0	0.00%
1968	2,925	49.66%	2,412	40.95%	553	9.39%
1972	3,716	63.74%	2,114	36.26%	0	0.00%
1976	2,750	45.48%	3,297	54.52%	0	0.00%
1980	2,999	49.39%	2,877	47.38%	196	3.23%
1984	3,612	60.67%	2,333	39.18%	9	0.15%
1988	2,719	52.61%	2,427	46.96%	22	0.43%
1992	2,311	42.64%	2,418	44.61%	691	12.75%
1996	2,131	41.85%	2,382	46.78%	579	11.37%
2000	2,940	57.21%	2,094	40.75%	105	2.04%
2004	3,590	60.33%	2,311	38.83%	50	0.84%
2008	3,397	60.93%	2,014	36.13%	164	2.94%
2012	3,616	69.11%	1,455	27.81%	161	3.08%
2016	4,443	75.92%	1,111	18.98%	298	5.09%
2020	5,068	78.09%	1,345	20.72%	77	1.19%
2024	5,089	79.93%	1,155	18.14%	123	1.93%

== Law, Government and infrastructure ==
Monroe County is governed by a three-person, elected county commission. Other elected officers include the sheriff, county clerk, circuit clerk, assessor, prosecuting attorney, surveyor, one circuit judge, two magistrates, and a family court judge. There is also a five-member school board and six conservation district supervisors, with at least two from each county in the district.

=== County Offices ===
==== Board of Education ====
Position	Holder	Party	Term expires
President	Dr. Scott Womack	non-partisan	2028
Vice President	Terry Utterback	non-partisan	2026
Board Member	Everett Fraley	non-partisan	2026
Board Member	Roho French	non-partisan	2028
Board Member	Candace Sabol	non-partisan	2026

The Board of Education is elected through non-partisan general elections, without primaries. While West Virginia law allows for elections by sub-districts or at-large, Monroe County's board members are elected from Magisterial Districts. Each of the three Magisterial Districts (Eastern, Central, and Western) is represented by one board member.

==== Commissioners ====
District	Holder	Party	Term expires
Central	Kenny Mann	Republican	Unknown
Eastern	Kevin Galford	Republican	Unknown
Western	Melvin Young	Unknown	Unknown

There are three members in the county commission. One member resides in each magisterial district, but are elected countywide. Commissioners hold six-year terms, and one commissioner is elected every two years.

==== Conservation District Supervisors ====
Office	Holder	Party	Term expires
Supervisor (Chairperson)	Gary Sawyers (Greenbrier)	non-partisan	2028
Supervisor (Vice-chair)	Timothy VanReenen (Pocahontas)	non-partisan	2028
Supervisor (Treasurer)	Gary Truex (Greenbrier)	non-partisan	2026
Supervisor	Donald McNeel (Pocahontas)	non-partisan	2028
Supervisor	Avery Atkins (Monroe)	non-partisan	2026
Supervisor	Carolyn Miller (Monroe)	non-partisan	2028

Monroe, along with Monroe and Pocahontas counties, is represented by the Greenbrier Valley district. At least two supervisors per county are elected during primaries and serve four-year terms.

==== Other County Offices ====
Office	Holder	Party	Term Expires
Assessor	Sarah Martin	Republican	Unknown
Clerk	Jeremy Meadows	Republican	Unknown
Prosecuting Attorney	Justin St. Clair	Democrat	Unknown
Sheriff	Michael Heller	Republican	Unknown
Surveyor	David Holz	Democrat	Unknown

=== Judicial ===
Monroe, along with Summers County is in the Thirtieth Judicial Circuit.

==== Circuit Court ====
Office	Holder	Party	Term expires
Judge	Amy Mann	non-partisan	2032
Clerk	Daniel Tickle	Republican	Unknown

Circuit Court Judges are elected to eight-year terms. Clerks are elected to eight-year terms.

==== Family Court ====
Office	Holder	Party	Term expires
Judge	R. Grady Ford	non-partisan	2032

Monroe, and Greenbrier county make up the 15th Family Court Circuit. Judges are elected to eight-year terms.

==== Magistrate Court ====
Division	Holder	Party	Term expires
1	Kevin Miller	non-partisan	2028
2	Frank Basile	non-partisan	2028
Clerk	Jeanne Gullette		

Magistrates are elected in non-partisan elections during primaries, and serve four-year terms.

=== State Legislature ===
Each county in West Virginia is represented by one or more House of Delegates members and state senators.

==== House of Delegates ====
District	Holder	Party	Term expires
40	Roy Cooper	Republican	2026
47	Ray Canterbury	Republican	2026

Monroe County is represented by the 40th and 47th District in the West Virginia House of Delegates. Delegates serve two-year terms with all of the seats in the House up for election every two years.

==== State Senate ====
Holder	Party	Term expires
Vince Deeds	Republican	2026
Jack Woodrum	Republican	2028

Monroe County is currently represented by West Virginia's 10th Senate district. Senators serve four-year terms with half of those seats up for election every two years.

=== Federal Representatives ===
==== United States House of Representatives ====
District	Holder	Party	Term expires
1st	Carol Miller	Republican	2027

Monroe County is represented in congress by the 1st congressional district of West Virginia.

==== United States Senate ====
Senator	Party	Term expires
Jim Justice	Republican	2031
Shelley Moore Capito	Republican	2027

=== FPC Alderson ===
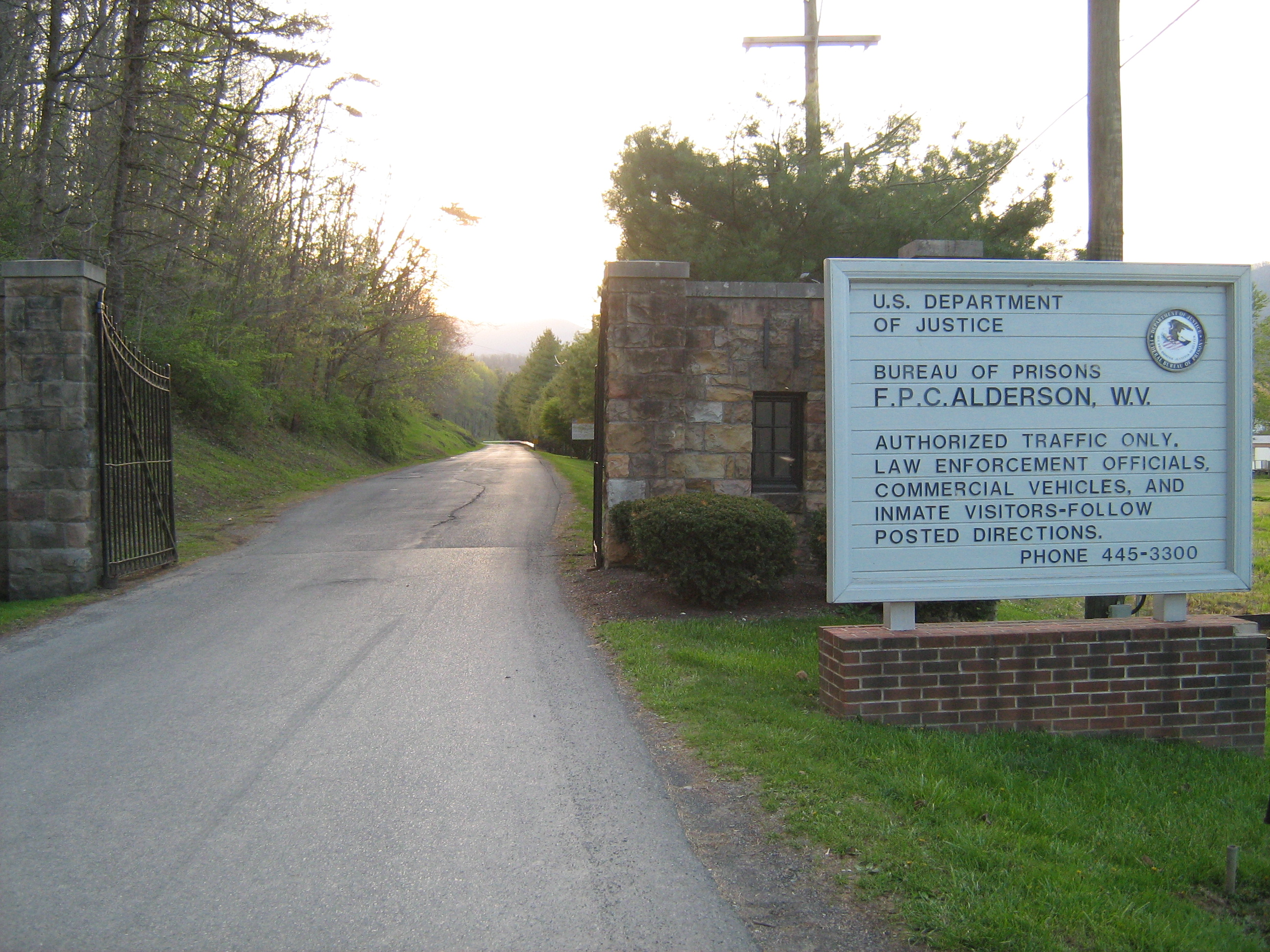
Alderson Federal Prison Camp entrance

The Federal Bureau of Prisons' Federal Prison Camp, Alderson was the nation's first women's federal prison. It is located in Monroe and Summers counties, west of Alderson.

== Natural landmarks ==
One of Monroe County's geological features is Haynes Cave, a former saltpeter mine. Workers in the mine found strange bones in the cave at the end of the 18th Century, and mailed them to Thomas Jefferson. Jefferson's study of the animal, the Megalonyx jeffersonii was arguably the birth of American paleontology. It is now the official West Virginia state fossil.

However, other saltpeter caves are in private ownership, and allow only limited public access due to ecological risks. One such is the Greenville Saltpeter Cave, designated a national natural landmark in 1973, and very important during the War of 1812.

== Historic landmarks ==
- Indian Creek Covered Bridge
- Rehoboth Church
- Laurel Creek Covered Bridge

== Education ==
Monroe County Schools operates public schools:

- James Monroe High School
- Mountain View Elementary/Middle School
- Peterstown Middle School
- Peterstown Elementary School

== Farmers' Day ==
Farmers' Day is an annual event, held on the first Saturday in June in Union, to recognize the farming families in the surrounding area. The event, founded by Louie H. Peters, fills the weekend, with a Friday dance, a 3k run, a Saturday pancake breakfast, Sunday activities, and a parade held in the town of Union.

== Notable inhabitants ==
- Henry Reed (1884-1968), old-time fiddler and banjo player

== Communities ==
=== Towns ===
- Alderson (part)
- Peterstown
- Union (county seat)

=== Magisterial districts ===
- Central
- Eastern
- Western

=== Unincorporated communities ===
- Ballard
- Ballengee
- Bozoo
- Cashmere
- Cloverdale
- Crimson Springs
- Elmhurst
- Gap Mills
- Gates
- Glace
- Greenville
- Hillsdale
- Hollywood
- Keenan
- Knobs
- Laurel Branch
- Lillydale
- Lindside
- Monitor
- Pickaway
- Raines Corner
- Red Sulphur Springs
- Rock Camp
- Salt Sulphur Springs
- Sarton
- Secondcreek
- Sinks Grove
- Sweet Springs
- Waiteville
- Wayside
- Wikel
- Wolfcreek
- Zenith

== See also ==
- Moncove Lake State Park
- National Register of Historic Places listings in Monroe County, West Virginia
- Bluestone Lake Wildlife Management Area
