= Union, West Virginia =

- Town
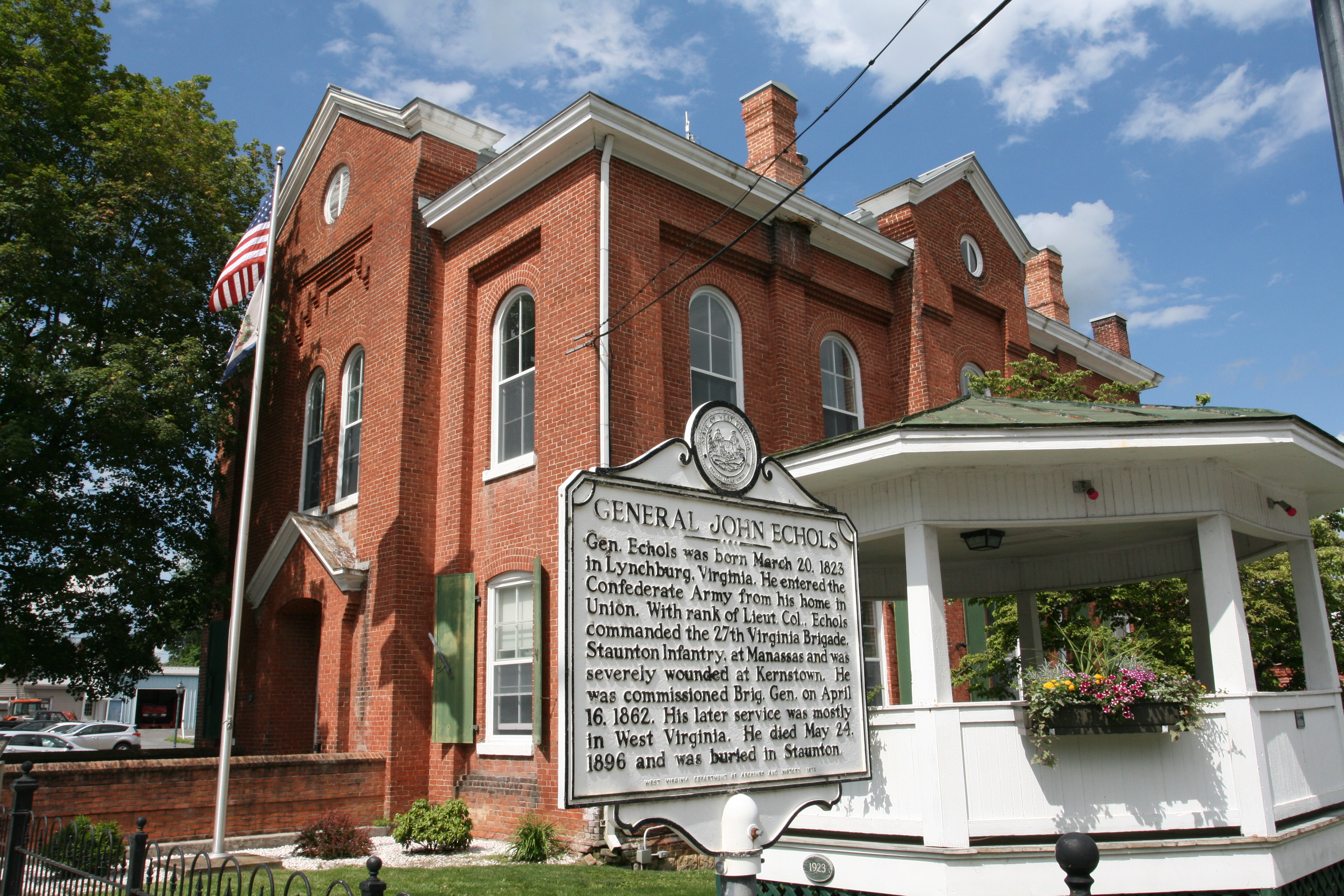
- The historic Monroe County Courthouse in Union.
- Interactive map of Union, West Virginia
- Location within West Virginia Location within the United States
- Coordinates: 37°35′28″N 80°32′35″W
- Country: United States
- State: West Virginia
- County: Monroe
- Settled: 1774
- Chartered: 1799
- Established: January 6, 1800

Area
  - Total: 0.45 sq mi (1.16 km^{2})
  - Land: 0.45 sq mi (1.16 km^{2})
  - Water: 0 sq mi (0.00 km^{2})
- Elevation: 2,073 ft (632 m)

Population (2020)
  - Total: 419
  - Estimate (2021): 425
  - Density: 1,208.9/sq mi (466.77/km^{2})
- Time zone: UTC-5 (Eastern (EST))
  - Summer (DST): UTC-4 (EDT)
- ZIP code: 24983
- Area codes: 304 & 681
- FIPS code: 54-81940
- GNIS feature ID: 1548463
- Website: local.wv.gov/union/Pages/default.aspx

Union is a town in Monroe County, West Virginia, United States. The population was 427 at the 2020 census. It is the county seat of Monroe County.

== History ==
Monroe County was established by an act of the Assembly of Virginia on January 14, 1799, occupying land formerly a part of Greenbrier County. Union did not yet exist when the county's first court convened in 1799. However, shortly after Monroe County was created, James Alexander offered 25 acres of land, including a lot for a courthouse which in time became the town of Union. On January 6, 1800, the Virginia Assembly passed an act creating the town of Union and naming William Haynes, John Gray, John Byrnside, James Handley, Michael Erskine, John Hutchinson, and Isaac Estill trustees.

By 1810, at least sixteen lots had been sold in the newly laid out town of Union and a courthouse and jail were built at its center. In 1835, Union had 400 inhabitants and supported two hotels, two tanneries, a school, two churches, and two physicians. Union's location on stage coach lines which carried settlers across the Allegheny Mountains helped to fuel the region's growth, as did the several mineral spring resorts which operated in Monroe County, including Sweet Springs, Red Sulphur Springs, and Salt Sulphur Springs, all within a twenty-five mile radius of Union. Little activity during the American Civil War occurred around Union other than troop movements, especially in 1864 when regiments of the U.S. Army under General Crook encamped near the town. Small skirmishes occurred throughout the war in the vicinity of Union and Monroe County. A majority of the citizens of Union supported the Confederacy and opposed the creation of West Virginia which included Monroe County. Union was incorporated in 1868.

The town of Union retains much of its historic architecture, with many structures dating to the antebellum period when the local economy was thriving from the resort industry. The present Monroe County Courthouse, built in 1881, displays the fashionable Romanesque style of the late-19th century. Historic churches in Union include the Old Baptist Church (1845), Old Methodist Episcopal Church/Ames Clair Hall (1857), All Saints Episcopal Church (1875), Union United Methodist Church (1889), and the Union Presbyterian Church (1922). The Monroe County Historical Society preserves several historic structures in the town, including the Caperton Law Office, Owen Neel House, Clark-Wisemen House, Ames Clair Hall, and the Old Baptist Church. In recognition of the history of Union and the integrity of its preserved streetscape, the Union Historic District was placed on the National Register of Historic Places in 1990.

East of Union is Rehoboth Church, built in 1784; it is the oldest existing church building in West Virginia.

== Geography ==
Union is located at 37°35′28″N 80°32′35″W (37.591211, -80.543022).

According to the United States Census Bureau, the town has a total area of 0.45 square miles (1.17 km^{2}), all land.

== Demographics ==
Historical population
Census	Pop.	Note	%±
1880	356		—
1890	312		−12.4%
1900	623		99.7%
1910	779		25.0%
1920	1,270		63.0%
1930	984		−22.5%
1940	1,020		3.7%
1950	1,341		31.5%
1960	1,186		−11.6%
1970	1,141		−3.8%
1980	1,090		−4.5%
1990	830		−23.9%
2000	806		−2.9%
2010	565		−29.9%
2020	419		−25.8%
2021 (est.)	425	▲	1.4%
U.S. Decennial Census

=== 2010 census ===
As of the census of 2010, there were 565 people, 264 households, and 156 families living in the town. The population density was 1,255.6 inhabitants per square mile (484.8/km^{2}). There were 310 housing units at an average density of 688.9 per square mile (266.0/km^{2}). The racial makeup of the town was 94.9% White, 2.5% African American, 0.2% Native American, 0.9% from other races, and 1.6% from two or more races. Hispanic or Latino of any race were 0.7% of the population.

There were 264 households, of which 26.1% had children under the age of 18 living with them, 38.3% were married couples living together, 16.3% had a female householder with no husband present, 4.5% had a male householder with no wife present, and 40.9% were non-families. 36.0% of all households were made up of individuals, and 19.7% had someone living alone who was 65 years of age or older. The average household size was 2.14 and the average family size was 2.77.

The median age in the town was 44.3 years. 21.8% of residents were under the age of 18; 6.2% were between the ages of 18 and 24; 23.4% were from 25 to 44; 24.2% were from 45 to 64; and 24.4% were 65 years of age or older. The gender makeup of the town was 48.1% male and 51.9% female.

=== 2000 census ===
As of the census of 2000, there were 548 people, 267 households, and 148 families living in the town. The population density was 1,216.6 inhabitants per square mile (470.2/km^{2}). There were 309 housing units at an average density of 686.0 per square mile (265.1/km^{2}). The racial makeup of the town was 94.16% White, 3.47% African American, 0.91% Native American, 0.36% Asian, and 1.09% from two or more races. Hispanic or Latino of any race were 0.18% of the population.

There were 267 households, out of which 21.3% had children under the age of 18 living with them, 43.4% were married couples living together, 10.5% had a female householder with no husband present, and 44.2% were non-families. 40.8% of all households were made up of individuals, and 21.7% had someone living alone who was 65 years of age or older. The average household size was 2.05 and the average family size was 2.75.

In the town, the population was spread out, with 19.7% under the age of 18, 8.9% from 18 to 24, 21.9% from 25 to 44, 26.6% from 45 to 64, and 22.8% who were 65 years of age or older. The median age was 45 years. For every 100 females, there were 85.1 males. For every 100 females age 18 and over, there were 79.6 males.

The median income for a household in the town was $21,797, and the median income for a family was $30,833. Males had a median income of $22,500 versus $14,773 for females. The per capita income for the town was $12,870. About 15.4% of families and 17.8% of the population were below the poverty line, including 20.0% of those under age 18 and 9.2% of those age 65 or over.

== Notable people ==
- Allen T. Caperton (1810–1876) — Confederate States and U.S. Senator
- Augustus A. Chapman — Virginia congressman and lawyer, brigadier general for the Confederacy in the Civil War
- Matthew W. Clair — among the first African American bishops in the Methodist Episcopal Church
- Thomas H. Stack, S.J. — American Jesuit, artilleryman for the Confederacy in the Civil War; shortest-serving president of Boston College
