= National Register of Historic Places listings in Monroe County, West Virginia =

Location of Monroe County in West Virginia

This is a list of the National Register of Historic Places listings in Monroe County, West Virginia.

This is intended to be a complete list of the properties and districts on the National Register of Historic Places in Monroe County, West Virginia, United States. The locations of National Register properties and districts for which the latitude and longitude coordinates are included below, may be seen in an online map.

There are 26 properties and districts listed on the National Register in the county.

This National Park Service list is complete through NPS recent listings posted May 1, 2026.

Contents: Counties in West Virginia

Barbour - Berkeley - Boone - Braxton - Brooke - Cabell - Calhoun - Clay - Doddridge - Fayette - Gilmer - Grant - Greenbrier - Hampshire - Hancock - Hardy - Harrison - Jackson - Jefferson - Kanawha - Lewis - Lincoln - Logan - Marion - Marshall - Mason - McDowell - Mercer - Mineral - Mingo - Monongalia - Monroe - Morgan - Nicholas - Ohio - Pendleton - Pleasants - Pocahontas - Preston - Putnam - Raleigh - Randolph - Ritchie - Roane - Summers - Taylor - Tucker - Tyler - Upshur - Wayne - Webster - Wetzel - Wirt - Wood - Wyoming

== Current listings ==
	Name on the Register	Image	Date listed	Location	City or town	Description
1	Alderson Bridge	Alderson Bridge	December 4, 1991 (#91001730)	Monroe St. across the Greenbrier River; 37°43′29″N 80°38′36″W	Alderson	
2	Alderson Historic District	Alderson Historic District	November 12, 1993 (#93001231)	Roughly along Monroe St., Riverview Dr., Railroad Ave. and adjacent streets 37°43′29″N 80°38′32″W	Alderson	
3	Byrnside-Beirne-Johnson House	Byrnside-Beirne-Johnson House	December 2, 1993 (#93001358)	County Route 13 south of Union; 37°34′30″N 80°32′19″W	Union	
4	Clarence Campbell House	Clarence Campbell House	July 21, 1995 (#95000872)	West Virginia Route 3; 37°35′24″N 80°31′26″W	Union	
5	William Gaston Caperton Jr. House	William Gaston Caperton Jr. House	November 21, 1991 (#91001733)	West Virginia Route 3 east of Union; 37°35′33″N 80°30′47″W	Union	
6	Cook's Mill	Cook's Mill	February 6, 1989 (#88001857)	County Route 2; 37°32′42″N 80°41′14″W	Greenville	
7	Dry Pond School		November 24, 2021 (#100007164)	4680 Pine Grove Rd. 37°29′12″N 80°43′45″W	Lindside vicinity	
8	Brig. Gen. John Echols House	Brig. Gen. John Echols House	June 27, 1985 (#85001415)	Elmwood and 2nd St. N. 37°35′33″N 80°32′32″W	Union	
9	Elmwood	Elmwood	May 13, 1976 (#76001942)	North of Union off U.S. Route 219; 37°35′44″N 80°32′23″W	Union	
10	Wallace Estill Sr. House	Wallace Estill Sr. House	April 9, 1984 (#84003634)	WV 122; 37°31′34″N 80°37′43″W	Union	
11	Indian Creek Covered Bridge	Indian Creek Covered Bridge	April 1, 1975 (#75001895)	1.5 mi (2.4 km) south of Salt Sulphur Springs on U.S. Route 219; 37°32′50″N 80°34′22″W	Salt Sulphur Springs	
12	Laurel Creek Covered Bridge	Laurel Creek Covered Bridge	June 4, 1981 (#81000605)	County Route 23/4 west of County Route 219/11; 37°33′40″N 80°37′36″W	Lillydale	
13	Lynnside Historic District	Lynnside Historic District	April 26, 1991 (#91000452)	Junction of WV 3 and Cove Creek Road; 37°38′12″N 80°14′46″W	Sweet Springs	
14	McNeer House	McNeer House	April 26, 1991 (#91000453)	U.S. Route 219 at Gin Run; 37°34′25″N 80°34′03″W	Salt Sulphur Springs	
15	Miller-Pence Farm		September 28, 2006 (#06000899)	8 mi (13 km) west of the junction of U.S. Route 219 and WV 122; 37°31′33″N 80°38′30″W	Greenville	
16	Nickell Homestead and Mill		December 15, 1998 (#98001472)	McClung Rd. 37°41′26″N 80°29′58″W	Ronceverte	
17	Old Sweet Springs	Old Sweet Springs	January 26, 1970 (#70000659)	WV 3; 37°37′43″N 80°14′29″W	Sweet Springs	
18	Pickaway Rural Historic District	Pickaway Rural Historic District	March 5, 1999 (#99000290)	Roughly between U.S. Route 219 and WV 3; 37°38′05″N 80°30′41″W	Union	
19	Reed's Mill	Reed's Mill	April 9, 1993 (#93000226)	County Route 219/1; 37°40′02″N 80°27′23″W	Second Creek	
20	Rehoboth Church	Rehoboth Church	December 31, 1974 (#74002016)	2 mi (3.2 km) east of Union off WV 3; 37°35′24″N 80°30′24″W	Union	
21	Salt Sulphur Springs Historic District	Salt Sulphur Springs Historic District	October 31, 1985 (#85003412)	U.S. Route 219; 37°34′12″N 80°34′09″W	Union	
22	Spring Valley Farm		December 30, 1974 (#74002017)	Northeast of Union on U.S. Route 219; 37°41′01″N 80°27′30″W	Union	
23	Sunset Hill	Sunset Hill	July 14, 2000 (#00000777)	Flat Mountain Rd. 37°43′14″N 80°38′15″W	Alderson	
24	Union Historic District	Union Historic District	December 6, 1990 (#90001844)	Roughly along Main, Dunlap, Pump, and Elmwood Sts. north from Royal Oak Field, including Paradise and Monument Fields; 37°35′35″N 80°32′25″W	Union	
25	Waiteville School		July 14, 2023 (#100009143)	1735 Rays Siding Rd. 37°28′17″N 80°25′11″W	Waiteville	
26	Walnut Grove	Walnut Grove	August 22, 1977 (#77001378)	North of Union on U.S. Route 219; 37°36′09″N 80°32′29″W	Union	

== See also ==
- List of National Historic Landmarks in West Virginia
- National Register of Historic Places listings in West Virginia
