= Caperton =

Caperton is a surname. Notable people with the surname include:

- Hugh Caperton (1781–1847), nineteenth-century congressman and planter from Virginia
- William Banks Caperton (1855–1941), Admiral of the United States Navy
- William Gaston Caperton III (born 1940), 31st Governor of the U.S. state of West Virginia
