= Nickells Mill, West Virginia =

- Unincorporated community
- Location within West Virginia Location within the United States
- Coordinates: 37°41′25″N 80°30′18″W
- Country: United States
- State: West Virginia
- County: Monroe
- Elevation: 1,768 ft (539 m)
- Time zone: UTC-5 (Eastern (EST))
  - Summer (DST): UTC-4 (EDT)
- Area codes: 304 & 681
- GNIS feature ID: 1555222

Nickells Mill is an unincorporated community in Monroe County, West Virginia, United States. Nickells Mill is east of Alderson.
