= Alexander McVeigh Miller House =

Historic house in West Virginia, United States

- Alexander McVeight Miller House
- U.S. National Register of Historic Places
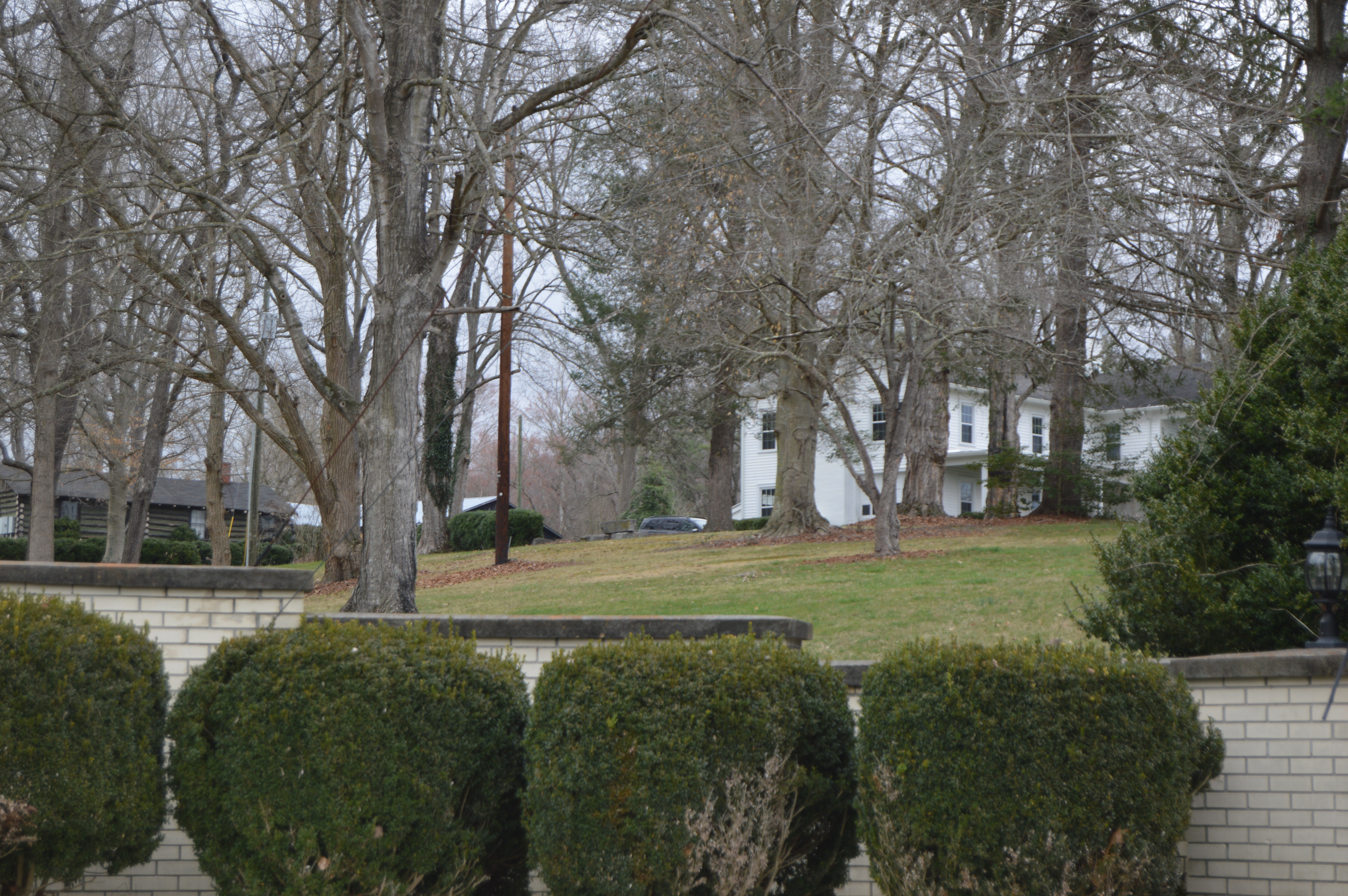
- Street view

- Location within West Virginia Location within the United States
- Location: Hemlock Ave., Alderson, West Virginia
- Coordinates: 37°43′53″N 80°38′5″W
- Area: 6 acres (2.4 ha)
- Built: 1881
- NRHP reference No.: 78002794
- Added to NRHP: December 15, 1978

Alexander McVeigh Miller House, also known as the Mittie Clark Miller House and "The Cedars", is a historic home located at Alderson, Greenbrier County, West Virginia. It was built starting in 1881, and is a large, T-shaped frame dwelling. It features three-bay verandas and a full height, pedimented, two-columned portico. It was the home of novelist Mittie Frances Clarke Point and her husband Alexander McVeigh Miller. In 1939, Ruth Bryan Owen (1885–1954) and her husband purchased "The Cedars" and began making repairs. They sold the property in 1945.

It was listed on the National Register of Historic Places in 1978.
