= Ballard Smith (Virginia politician) =

American politician

Member of the Virginia House of Delegates from Greenbrier County
- In office 1836
- Preceded by: Pierre Withered
- Succeeded by: Hezekiah Pinnell
- In office 1824–1825; Joseph Alderson
- In office 1810–1812; Alongside Linah Mims, William Morrow

Member of the U.S. House of Representatives from Virginia's 7th district
- In office March 4, 1815 – March 3, 1821
- Preceded by: Hugh Caperton
- Succeeded by: William Smith

Personal details
- Born: Unknown Hanover County, Virginia
- Died: Unknown
- Party: Democratic-Republican

Military service
- Allegiance: United States of America
- Branch/service: Continental Army; United States Army
- Rank: Captain Lieutenant; Major
- Unit: 1st Virginia Regiment
- Battles/wars: American Revolutionary War

Ballard Smith was a soldier and congressman from Virginia.

== Biography ==
Smith was born in Hanover County, Virginia. In the Revolutionary War, he rose to the now-defunct rank of captain lieutenant in the 1st Virginia Regiment of the Continental Army. In the 1790s, he rose to the rank of major in the United States Army.

He was a member of the Virginia House of Delegates from 1810 to 1813 and was later elected a Democratic-Republican to the United States House of Representatives in 1814, serving from 1815 to 1821. Afterwards, Smith returned to the House of Delegates in 1824, serving again until 1826 and again in 1836 and 1837.

== Electoral history ==
- 1815; Smith was elected to the U.S. House of Representatives, defeating Federalist John Mathews.
- 1817; Smith was re-elected unopposed.
- 1819; Smith was re-elected unopposed.

U.S. House of Representatives
Preceded by Hugh Caperton	Member of the U.S. House of Representatives from Virginia's 7th congressional district 1815–1821	Succeeded by William Smith
