= Allen T. Caperton =

American politician (1810–1876)

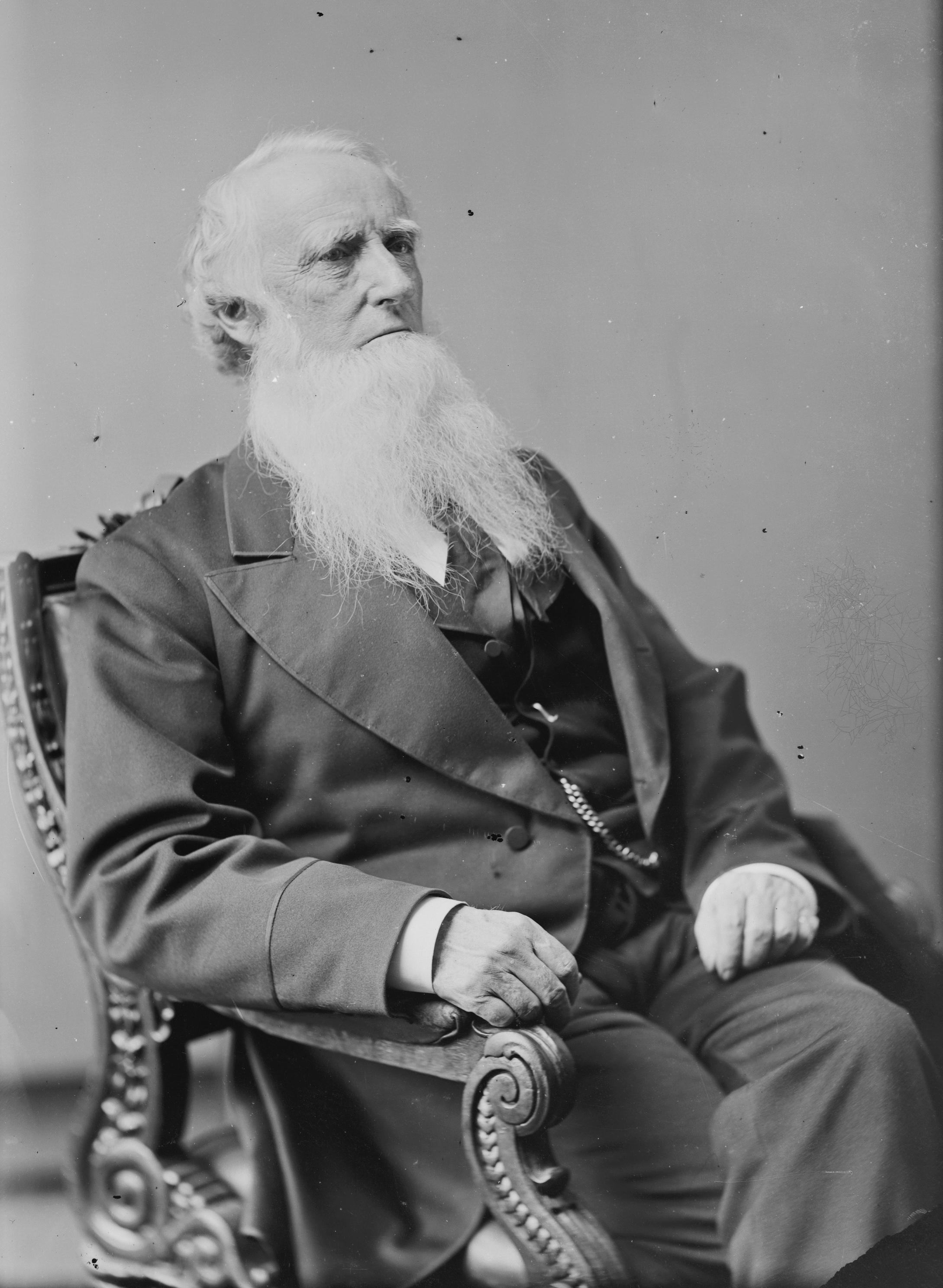
- Caperton, 1865–1986

United States Senator from West Virginia
- In office March 4, 1875 – July 26, 1876
- Preceded by: Arthur Boreman
- Succeeded by: Samuel Price

Confederate States Senator from Virginia
- In office January 22, 1864 – May 10, 1865
- Preceded by: William B. Preston
- Succeeded by: Constituency abolished

Member of the Virginia House of Delegates from Monroe County
- In office December 7, 1857 – December 2, 1861
- Preceded by: Alexander Clarke
- Succeeded by: Wilson Lively
- In office December 6, 1841 – December 5, 1842
- Preceded by: Augustus A. Chapman
- Succeeded by: William Adair

Personal details
- Born: Allen Taylor Caperton; November 21, 1810 Union, Virginia, U.S. (now West Virginia)
- Died: July 26, 1876 (aged 65) Washington, D.C., U.S.
- Resting place: Green Hill Cemetery; Union, West Virginia, U.S.
- Party: Democratic
- Spouse: Harriet Echols
- Children: 5
- Parent: Hugh Caperton (father)
- Education: University of Virginia; Yale University
- Occupation: Politician; lawyer

Allen Taylor Caperton (November 21, 1810 – July 26, 1876) was an American politician who was a United States senator from the State of West Virginia in 1875–1876. He was a member of the Democratic Party. He had been in the Virginia House of Delegates and Virginia Senate before the American Civil War. During the Civil War, he was a Confederate States senator.

== Early life ==
Allen Taylor Caperton was born on November 21, 1810, near Union, Monroe County, Virginia (now West Virginia), to Jane Erskine and Hugh Caperton. At the age of 14, he traveled by horseback to Huntsville, Alabama, to attend school. He later graduated from the University of Virginia at Charlottesville, then graduated from Yale College in 1832. He studied law under Briscoe Baldwin in Staunton, Virginia, and was admitted to the bar.

== Political career ==
Caperton practiced law. He was a member of the Virginia House of Delegates from 1841 to 1842 and later served in the Virginia Senate from 1844 to 1848. A Whig, he was one of the Virginia delegates to the 1848 Whig National Convention. He was a member of the Virginia House of Delegates again from 1857 to 1861. In 1850, he was a delegate to the state constitutional convention. In 1861, he was a member of the Virginia Secession Convention.

During the Civil War, he was elected by the legislature of Virginia to be a member of the Confederate States Senate in which he sat until 1865. After the war, he was the first ex-Confederate elected to the United States Senate, entering office as a Democrat from West Virginia, from March 4, 1875, until his death.

Caperton was director of the James River and Kanawha Canal.

== Personal life ==
Elmwood Mansion

Caperton married Harriet Echols, sister of John Echols. They had five children, Lin, Lizzie, Mrs. William A. Gordon, Mary and Allen T. Jr. His daughter Lin married James French Patton and later married judge Edward Franklin Bingham.

Caperton died of heart disease at his room on I Street NW in Washington, D.C., on July 26, 1876. He was interred in Green Hill Cemetery in Union, West Virginia.

His residence near Union, "Elmwood," was listed on the National Register of Historic Places in 1976.

== See also ==
- List of members of the United States Congress who died in office (1790–1899)

Confederate States Senate
Preceded by William Preston	Confederate States Senator (Class 2) from Virginia; 1864–1865; Served alongside: Robert Hunter	Constituency abolished
U.S. Senate
Preceded by Arthur Boreman	U.S. senator (Class 1) from West Virginia; March 4, 1875 – July 26, 1876; Served alongside: Henry Davis	Succeeded by Samuel Price
