= Mrs. Alex. McVeigh Miller =

American novelist (1850–1937)

Mittie Miller
- Mrs. Alex. McVeigh Miller
- Born: Mittie Frances Clarke Point; April 30, 1850; Doswell, Virginia, U.S.
- Died: December 26, 1937 (aged 87); Florida, U.S.
- Education: Richmond Female Institute
- Occupation: Dime novelist
- Spouse(s): Thomas Jefferson Davis (died); Alexander McVeigh Miller (m. 1878; div. 1908)
- Writing career
- Pen name: Mrs. Alex. McVeigh Miller
- Language: English

Mrs. Alex. McVeigh Miller (née Point; after first marriage, Davis; after second marriage, Miller; April 30, 1850 – December 26, 1937) was the pen name of Mittie Frances Clarke Point, an American novelist. She wrote 80 dime novels during a 50-year career. Her first novel was Rosamond, but her success began with the 1883 romance, The Bride of the Tomb. She died in 1937. In 1978, her home, "The Cedars", was listed on the National Register of Historic Places.

== Biography ==
Mittie Frances Clarke Point was born in Doswell, Virginia, April 30, 1850. Her parents were Charles J. Point and Mary G. (Crow) Point.

She graduated from Richmond Female Institute on June 30, 1868.

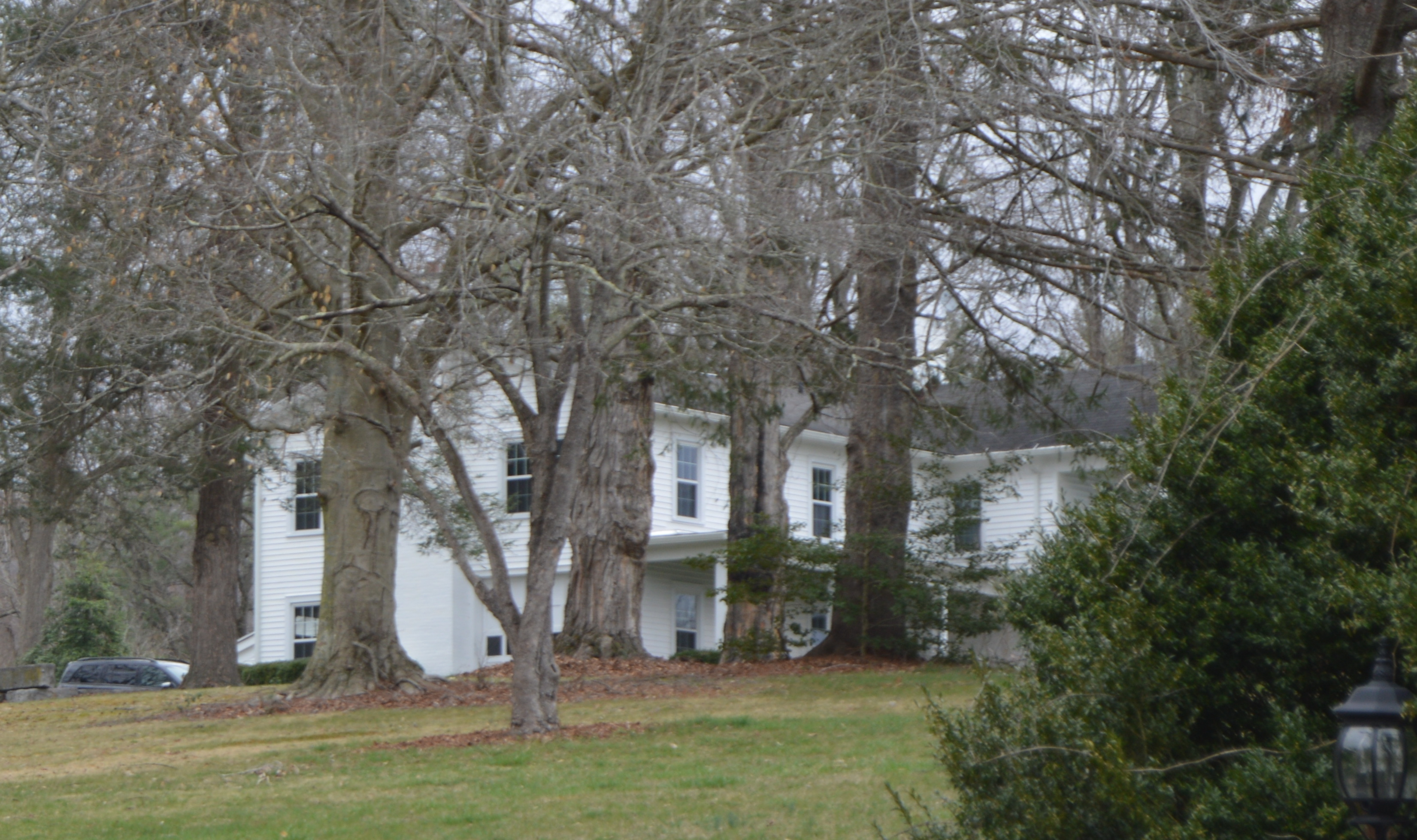
Home in Alderson

She first married Thomas Jefferson Davis and they had a daughter, but both husband and daughter died within two years. Returning to her home in Richmond, Virginia, she wrote short stories for Old Dominion and Temperance Advocate. She then married a teacher named Alexander McVeigh Miller in 1878 and they lived in Fayette County, West Virginia. Her 1883 romance, The Bride of the Tomb, was successful, and others followed. The Millers built "The Cedars" in Alderson, West Virginia, and this also helped him with a political career, having been elected to the West Virginia Senate during the period of 1901 to 1909. She divorced him in 1908 because of infidelity, moving with her daughter Irene to Boston. She died in Florida, December 26, 1937.

== Selected works ==
- 188?, An old man's darling
- 188?, The mystery of Suicide Place
- 1882, Lady Gay's pride, or, Only a broken heart
- 1883, Sworn to silence, or, A burdensome secret
- 1883, Jaquelina, or, The outlaw's bride
- 1883, Little Goldens̓ daughter, or, The dream of her life-time
- 1883, Bonnie Dora : or, Winning the heir
- 1883, The bride of the tomb; and, Queenie's terrible secret
- 1883, The bride of the tomb; or, Lancelot Darling's betrothed
- 1883, A dreadful temptation, or, A young wife's ambition
- 1883, Sworn to silence, or, Aline Rodney's secret
- 1883, Guy Kenmore's wife; or, Her mother's secret
- 1884, The pearl and the ruby, or, The beautiful rivals
- 1884, Lady Gay's pride; or, The miser's treasure
- 1886, Molly's treachery
- 1886, Little Nobody
- 1887, Flower and Jewel; or, Daisy Forrest's daughter
- 1888, Brunette and blonde, or, The struggle for a birthright
- 1889, Little Sweetheart : or, Norman De Vere's protegee
- 1891, Kathleen's diamonds : or, She loved a handsome actor
- 1892, Eric Braddon's love
- 1892, Little Coquette Bonnie : or, crossed in love. Chapters I-XI
- 1892, Tiger-lily; or, The woman who came between
- 1896, A dreadful temptation, and Countess Vera
- 1896, Bonnie Dora and Little Golden's daughter
- 1896, The strength of love, or, An unbidden guest
- 1896, Queenie's terrible secret, and the rose and the lily
- 1896, When we two parted, or, Among love's rapids
- 1897, Loved you better than you knew
- 1897, The senator's bride
- 1898, Lancaster's choice
- 1898, Dainty's cruel rivals : or, The fatal birthday
- 1894, Lillian, my Lillian, or, Queen of the comic opera
- 1896, Lynette's wedding, or, Married and parted
- 1887, Mabel's fate, or, A broken betrothal
- 1891, What was she to him? or, Virginia King's heart
- 1885, Cruelly divided, or, A plot for a fortune
- 1886, Little Vixen, or, When two loves conflict
- 1887, My little love, or, Swept away by passion
- 1893, A little Southern beauty, or, Tortured hearts
- 1895, The senator's favorite
- 1899, My pretty maid, or, Liane Lester
- 1884, Where love dwelt, or, The two brides' fate
- 1885, Tempted by gold, or, A life and love wasted
- 1888, Loyal unto death, or, Roselle's true love
- 1898, My pretty maid, or, Her dangerous secret
- 1899, A married flirt, or, Pride and its penalty
- 1888, The man she hated, or, Won by strategy
- 1892, They looked and loved, or, Won by faith
- 1896, When we two parted, or, A heart's tragedy
- 1898, Pretty madcap Lucy, or, The shadows over her
- 1898, Slighted love, or, At her heart's expense
- 1899, The thorns of regret, or, His brother's wife
- 1889, Rosamond, or, Sundered hearts
- 1900, Only a kiss, or, Cast out
- 1900, The shadow between them, or, A blighted name
- 1900, Only a kiss, or, With her whole heart
- 1901, Love is love forevermore, or, A triumph of two true hearts
- 1901, The unbidden guest, or, Between two passions
- 1901, The price of happiness, or, The triumph of two true hearts
- 1902, Nina's peril : or, The fowler's snares
- 1905, The sword of Damocles
- 1902, The fatal kiss, or, Her evil genius
- 1901, Her husband's secret, or, Bought and paid for
- 1903, All for love, or, Her heart's sacrifice
- 1911, That girl named Hazel
- 1917, Her life's burden : or, The road of the wicked
- 1917, Her sister's secret, or, The chain of fate
- 1919, What was she to him? or, Her evil shadow
