= Joseph Lewis Jr. (Virginia politician) =

American politician and lawyer

Member of the Virginia House of Delegates from Loudoun County
- In office 1817; Alongside Robert Braden
- In office 1799–1802; Alongside William Noland and Stephen Roszel

Member of the U.S. House of Representatives from Virginia's 8th district
- In office March 4, 1813 – March 3, 1817
- Preceded by: John Taliaferro
- Succeeded by: Charles F. Mercer

Member of the U.S. House of Representatives from Virginia's 7th district
- In office March 4, 1803 - March 3, 1813
- Preceded by: John Randolph
- Succeeded by: Hugh Caperton

Chairman of the House Committee on the District of Columbia
- In office March 4, 1811 – March 3, 1813
- Preceded by: John Love
- Succeeded by: John Dawson
- In office March 4, 1807 – March 3, 1809
- Preceded by: Position established
- Succeeded by: John Love

Personal details
- Born: 1772 Virginia Colony, British America
- Died: March 30, 1834 (aged 61–62) Clifton, Virginia, U.S.
- Party: Federalist Party

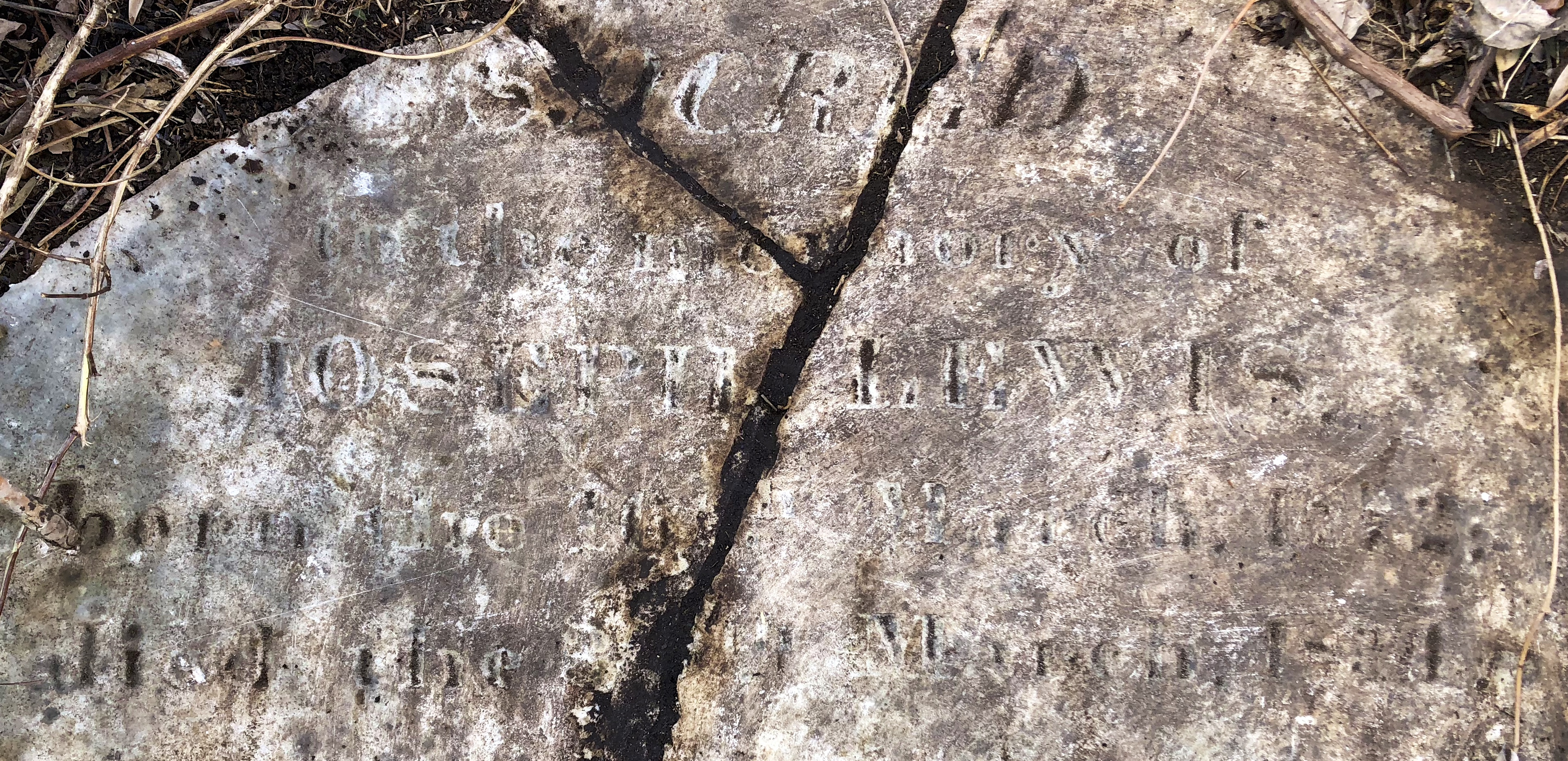
At Clifton Farm in Upperville, Virginia

Joseph Lewis Jr. (1772 – March 30, 1834) was an 18th-century and 19th-century politician and lawyer from Virginia.

== Biography ==
Born in the Colony of Virginia, Lewis served in the Virginia House of Delegates from 1799 to 1803. He was then elected a Federalist to the United States House of Representatives in 1802, serving from 1803 to 1817. There, he served as chairman of the Committee on the District of Columbia from 1807 to 1809 and again from 1811 to 1813. Lewis returned to the House of Delegates in 1817 and 1818. He died at Clifton Farm in Upperville, Virginia, on March 30, 1834.

== Electoral history ==
- 1805; Lewis was elected to the U.S. House of Representatives with 55.95% of the vote, defeating Democratic-Republican William Elzey.
- 1807; Lewis was re-elected with 55.19% of the vote, defeating Democratic-Republican John Littlejohn.
- 1809; Lewis was re-elected with 62.04% of the vote, defeating Democratic-Republican William Tyler.
- 1811; Lewis was re-elected with 80.09% of the vote, defeating Democratic-Republican John Love.

U.S. House of Representatives
Preceded by John Randolph	Member of the U.S. House of Representatives from Virginia's 7th congressional district 1803–1813	Succeeded by Hugh Caperton
Preceded by John Taliaferro	Member of the U.S. House of Representatives from Virginia's 8th congressional district 1813–1817	Succeeded by Charles F. Mercer
