= Elmwood (Union, West Virginia) =

Historic house in West Virginia, United States

- U.S. National Register of Historic Places
- U.S. Historic district – Contributing property
- The mansion in 2015

- Location within West Virginia Location within the United States
- Location: North of Union off U.S. Route 219, near Union, West Virginia
- Coordinates: 37°35′44″N 80°32′23″W
- Area: 8 acres (3.2 ha)
- Built: 1835
- Architectural style: Greek Revival
- NRHP reference No.: 76001942
- Added to NRHP: May 13, 1976

Elmwood, also known as the Hugh Caperton House, is a historic home located near Union, Monroe County, West Virginia. It was built in the 1830s, and is a two-story, nearly square brick dwelling with Greek Revival details. The front facade features wide limestone steps and a veranda, with second-story balcony, Chinese Chippendale railings at both levels, and four plain but huge plaster covered brick columns. The house was built by Congressman Hugh Caperton (1781–1847). It was home to Allen T. Caperton (1810–1876), the first ex-Confederate elected to the United States Senate after the American Civil War.

It was listed on the National Register of Historic Places in 1976. It is located in the Union Historic District, listed in 1990.

== Gallery ==
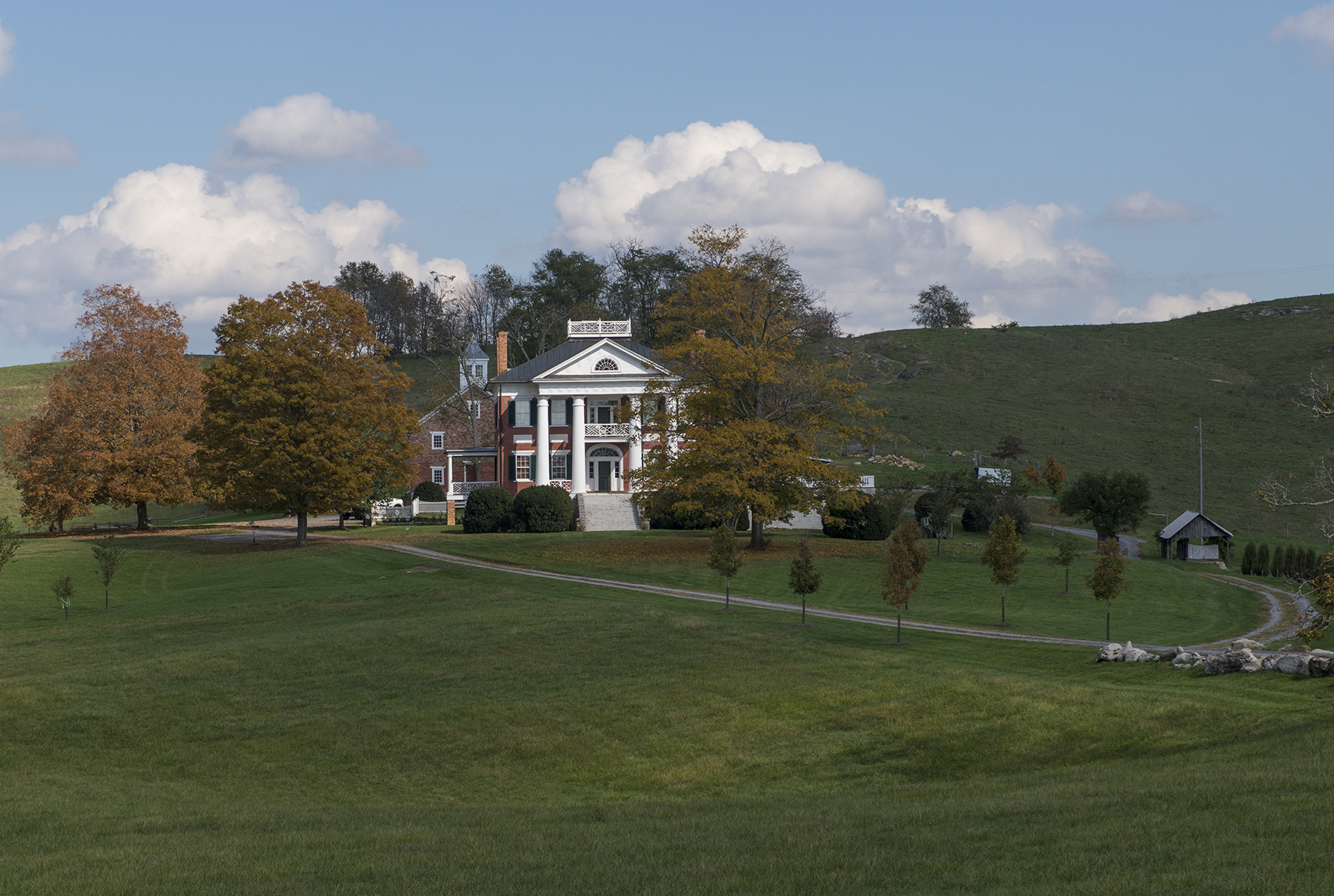
Distant view from U.S. Route 219 in 2016

Barn in 2015

Outhouse, described as "rather fancy", in 2015
