= Waiteville, West Virginia =

- Unincorporated community
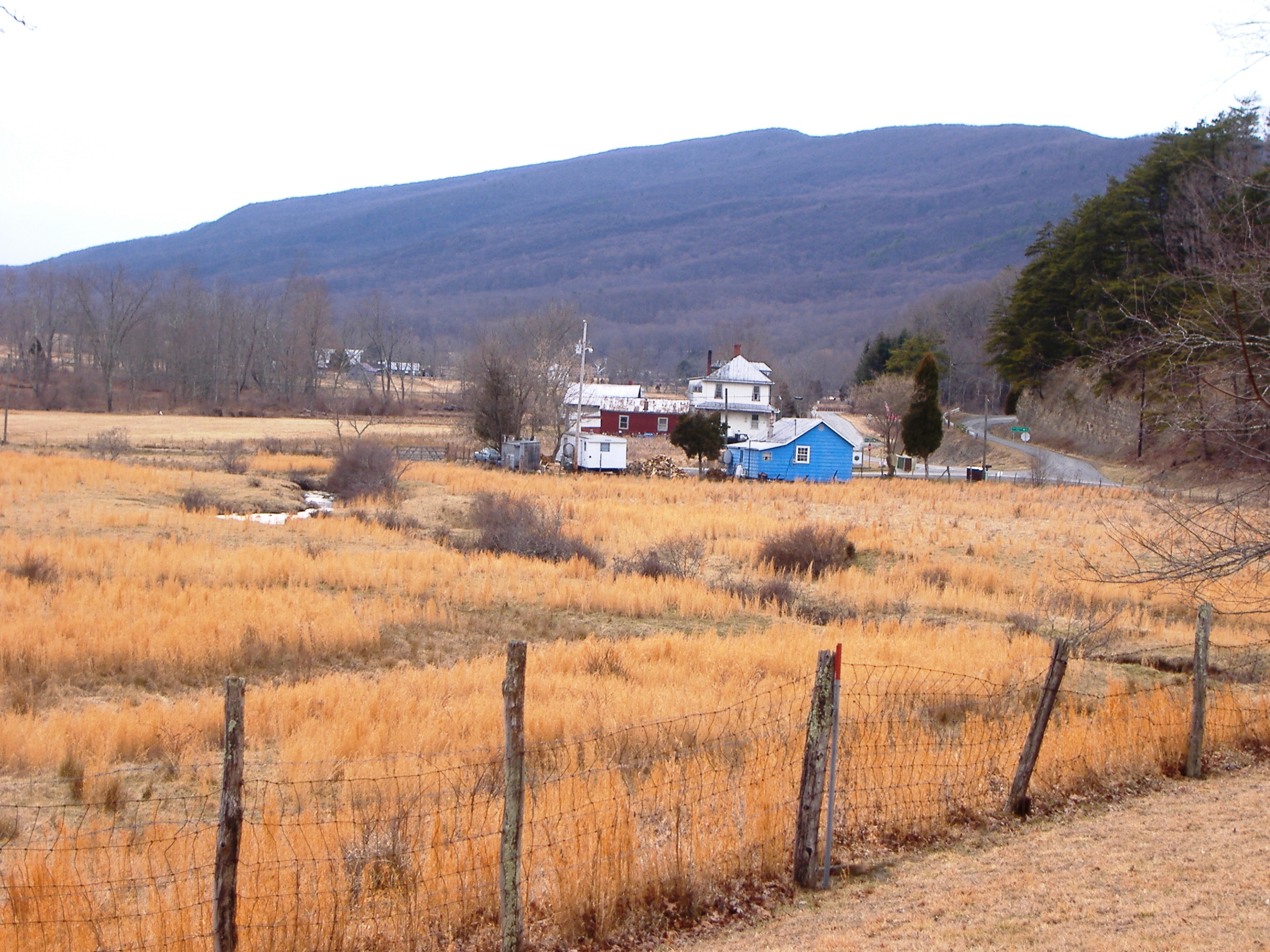

- Location within West Virginia Location within the United States
- Coordinates: 37°28′25″N 80°25′19″W
- Country: United States
- State: West Virginia
- County: Monroe
- Elevation: 2,195 ft (669 m)
- Time zone: UTC-5 (Eastern (EST))
  - Summer (DST): UTC-4 (EDT)
- ZIP code: 24984
- Area codes: 304 & 681
- GNIS feature ID: 1555904

Waiteville is an unincorporated community in Monroe County, West Virginia, United States. Waiteville is located near the Virginia border, southeast of Union. Waiteville had a post office, which closed on July 11, 2009.

== Points of interest ==
- Waiteville School, former One-room school that served the Waiteville community
- N&W RY Passenger Depot
