= Nickell Homestead and Mill =

Historic house in West Virginia, United States

- U.S. National Register of Historic Places
- U.S. Historic district
- Location within West Virginia Location within the United States
- Location: McClung Rd., near Ronceverte, West Virginia
- Coordinates: 37°41′26″N 80°29′58″W
- Area: 72 acres (29 ha)
- Built: 1814
- Architectural style: Federal, Colonial Revival
- NRHP reference No.: 98001472
- Added to NRHP: December 15, 1998

Nickell Homestead and Mill, also known as Mont Glenn Farm, is a historic home, grist mill, and national historic district located at Secondcreek, near Ronceverte, Monroe County, West Virginia. The district includes seven contributing buildings. The original section of the main house was built about 1820, with additions made in 1858, and about 1900. It is a 2 1/2-story, six bay brick and frame Federal style dwelling. The 1900 addition has some Colonial Revival style details. Also on the property is a two-story mill built in 1814, a barn (c. 1940s), machine shed (c. 1920s), hog shed (c. 1900), garage (c. 1920), and house by the mill (c. 1920). The Nickell mill closed in 1949. The property upon which the mill stood was sold in 2014 or 2015. The new owner tore down the mill. The only thing remaining is the stone foundation. The new owner is not maintaining the property and the house is also falling into disrepair. One wonders why this person bought an historic property only to destroy it.

It was listed on the National Register of Historic Places in 1998.
