= Hugh Caperton =

American politician

Member of the Virginia House of Delegates from Monroe County
- In office 1826–1829; Alongside Alexander Dunlap and William Vass
- In office 1810–1812; Alongside John Gray

Member of the U.S. House of Representatives from Virginia's 7th district
- In office March 4, 1813 - March 3, 1815
- Preceded by: Joseph Lewis, Jr.
- Succeeded by: Ballard Smith

Personal details
- Born: April 17, 1781 Greenbrier County, Virginia
- Died: February 9, 1847 (aged 65) "Elmwood", Union, Virginia
- Party: Federalist
- Children: Allen

Hugh Caperton (April 17, 1781 – February 9, 1847) was an American politician and planter from Virginia. He was the father of Allen T. Caperton whom he had with his wife Jane Erskine Caperton.

== Biography ==
Born in Greenbrier County, Virginia (now West Virginia), Caperton was a planter and engaged in mercantile pursuits as a young man. He moved to Monroe County, Virginia which he became sheriff of in 1805 and became a member of the Virginia House of Delegates in 1810, serving until 1813. He was elected a Federalist to the United States House of Representatives in 1812, serving from 1813 to 1815 and later returned to the House of Delegates from 1826 to 1830. Caperton resumed engaging in agricultural and mercantile pursuits until his death at his estate called "Elmwood" near Union, Virginia (now West Virginia) on February 9, 1847. He was interred at Green Hill Cemetery in Union.

"Elmwood" was listed on the National Register of Historic Places in 1976.

== 1813 election ==
Caperton was elected to the U.S. House of Representatives with 100% of the vote, defeating Republican Ballard Smith.

U.S. House of Representatives
Preceded by Joseph Lewis Jr.	Member of the U.S. House of Representatives from Virginia's 7th congressional district 1813–1815	Succeeded by Ballard Smith
