= Miller–Pence Farm =

Historic house in West Virginia, United States

- U.S. National Register of Historic Places
- Location within West Virginia Location within the United States
- Location: 8 mi (13 km) west of the junction of U.S. Route 219 and WV 122, near Greenville, West Virginia
- Coordinates: 37°42′32″N 80°38′18″W
- Area: 406 acres (164 ha)
- Built: 1770
- Built by: Jacob Miller, Henry Pence
- Architectural style: Federal, Gothic
- NRHP reference No.: 06000899
- Added to NRHP: September 28, 2006

Miller–Pence Farm is a historic home and farm located near Greenville, Monroe County, West Virginia. The main farmhouse was built in 1828, with five modifications through 1910. It began as a two-story Federal style brick home on a coursed rubble foundation. A two-story addition dated to the 1880s, with a cut stone foundation, has board-and-batten siding, evoking the Carpenter Gothic architectural style. Also on the property are a former slave school (c. 1870), second school (c. 1870), three barns (c. 1880–1920), tractor shed (c. 1920), equipment shed (c. 1930), corn crib and ruins of Miller's Frontier House (c. 1770), spring box (c. 1778), original road cut (c. 1800), and the Miller-Halstead Cemetery (c. 1775).

It was listed on the National Register of Historic Places in 2006.
