= Dry Pond School =

Historic schoolhouse in West Virginia, US

- Waiteville School
- U.S. National Register of Historic Places
- Location within West Virginia Location within the United States
- Location: 4680 Pine Grove Rd, Peterstown, West Virginia 24951
- Coordinates: 37°29′12″N 80°43′45″W
- Built: 1923
- NRHP reference No.: 100007164
- Added to NRHP: November 24, 2021

The Dry Pond School, built in 1923, is a historic rural schoolhouse located in the unincorporated community of Orchard in Monroe County, West Virginia. This one-story, wood-clad building features modest Neoclassical influences, most notably a recessed front entrance, and is situated atop a hill with views of the surrounding farmland and forest. A small windbreak of trees and shrubs separates the schoolyard from the neighboring fields, and three noncontributing outbuildings remain on the property.

The school was listed on the National Register of Historic Places in 2023.
