= Walnut Grove (Union, West Virginia) =

Historic house in West Virginia, United States

- U.S. National Register of Historic Places
- U.S. Historic district – Contributing property
- The house in 2015

- Location within West Virginia Location within the United States
- Location: U.S. Route 219 north of Union, West Virginia
- Coordinates: 37°36′9″N 80°32′29″W
- Area: 5 acres (2.0 ha)
- Built: 1783
- Architectural style: Greek Revival, Federal
- NRHP reference No.: 77001378
- Added to NRHP: August 22, 1977

"Walnut Grove", also known as the Andrew Beirne House, is a historic home located near Union, Monroe County, West Virginia. It is a T-shaped dwelling that integrates four separate structures. The oldest date to the 1780s and incorporates two, two-story log buildings. Attached to them is a formerly detached log kitchen. A two-story, Greek Revival-style brick addition was built after 1825. The entrance is in this section and features a one-story porch supported by square columns. Also on the property are a two-room frame office building, brick smokehouse, and stone springhouse. It was home to U.S. Congressman Andrew Beirne (1771–1845).

It was listed on the National Register of Historic Places in 1977. It is located in the Union Historic District, listed in 1990.
