= William Gaston Caperton Jr. House =

Historic house in West Virginia, United States

- U.S. National Register of Historic Places
- U.S. Historic district
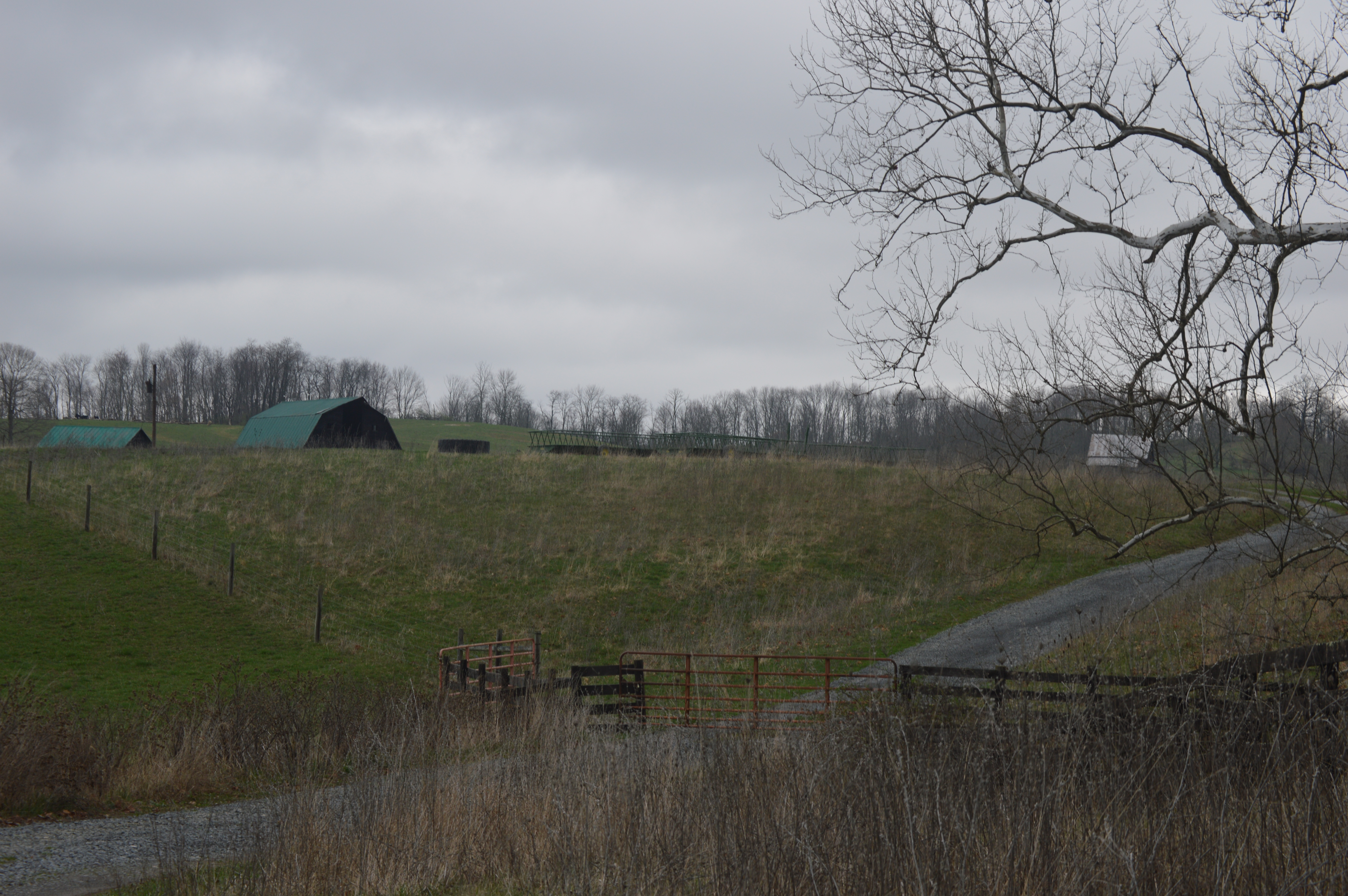
- Property entrance

- Location within West Virginia Location within the United States
- Nearest city: WV 3 east of Union, near Union, West Virginia
- Coordinates: 37°35′33″N 80°30′47″W
- Area: 15 acres (6.1 ha)
- Built: 1773
- Architectural style: Greek Revival, Georgian
- NRHP reference No.: 91001733
- Added to NRHP: November 21, 1991

William Gaston Caperton Jr. House, also known as "Wyndridge," is a historic home and national historic district located near Union, Monroe County, West Virginia. The district includes nine contributing buildings. The main house was built in 1872, and is a large, almost square, two-story hipped roof Georgian plan house. The front facade features a one-story portico that is Greek Revival in form. The 1872 house incorporates two two-story late 18th century log structures and the early pioneer 1773 Blanton House. Also on the property are the contributing log ice house and log smoke house, barn with vertical siding, a cattle scales and a machine shed, carriage shed, and a shed. Gaston Caperton, who served as Governor of West Virginia from 1989 to 1997, is a descendant of William Gaston Caperton Jr.

It was listed on the National Register of Historic Places in 1991.
