= Greenville, Monroe County, West Virginia =

Greenville, West Virginia
- Unincorporated community
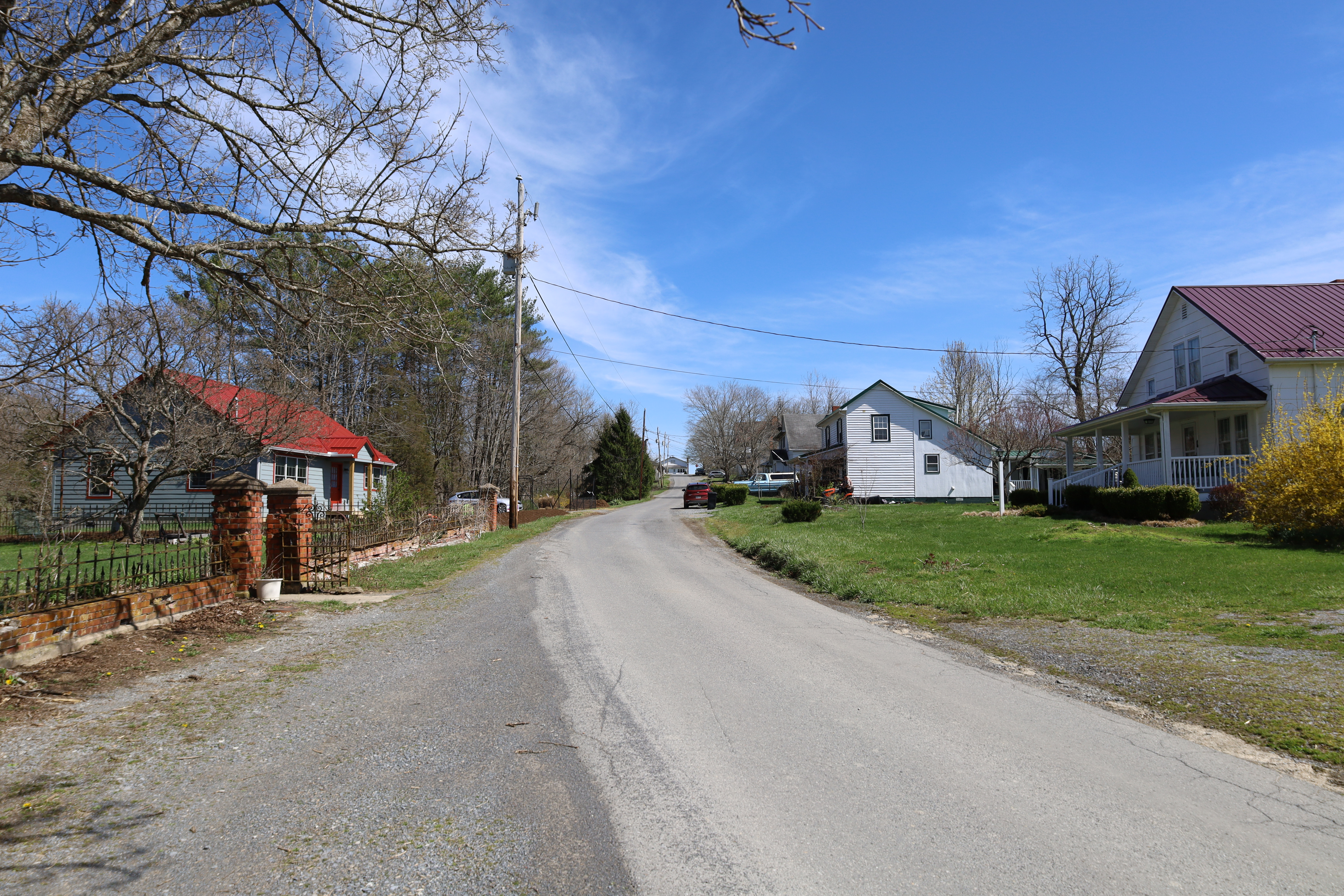
- Houses in Greenville in 2022

- Location within West Virginia Location within the United States
- Coordinates: 37°32′36″N 80°40′57″W
- Country: United States
- State: West Virginia
- County: Monroe
- Elevation: 1,696 ft (517 m)
- Time zone: UTC-5 (Eastern (EST))
  - Summer (DST): UTC-4 (EDT)
- Area codes: 304 & 681
- GNIS feature ID: 1558761

Greenville is an unincorporated community in Monroe County, West Virginia, United States. Greenville is located on West Virginia Route 122, west of Union. The community was formerly called Centreville.

Located near Greenville are Cook's Mill and the Miller-Pence Farm, both listed on the National Register of Historic Places.
