= Waiteville School =

Historic building in West Virginia, US

- U.S. National Register of Historic Places
- Location within West Virginia Location within the United States
- Location: 1735 Rays Siding Rd, Waiteville, West Virginia 24984
- Coordinates: 37°28′17″N 80°25′11″W
- Built: 1950
- NRHP reference No.: 100009143
- Added to NRHP: July 14, 2023

The Waiteville School is a one-story, front-gabled former schoolhouse constructed in 1950 in Waiteville, a historic railroad community in Monroe County, West Virginia. Built from concrete block and topped with a simple metal roof, the structure sits on a small knoll overlooking Rays Siding Road, surrounded by a flat, grassy landscape and accessed by a gravel drive.

The school was listed on the National Register of Historic Places in 2023.
