= Brig. Gen. John Echols House =

Historic house in West Virginia, United States

- U.S. National Register of Historic Places
- U.S. Historic district – Contributing property
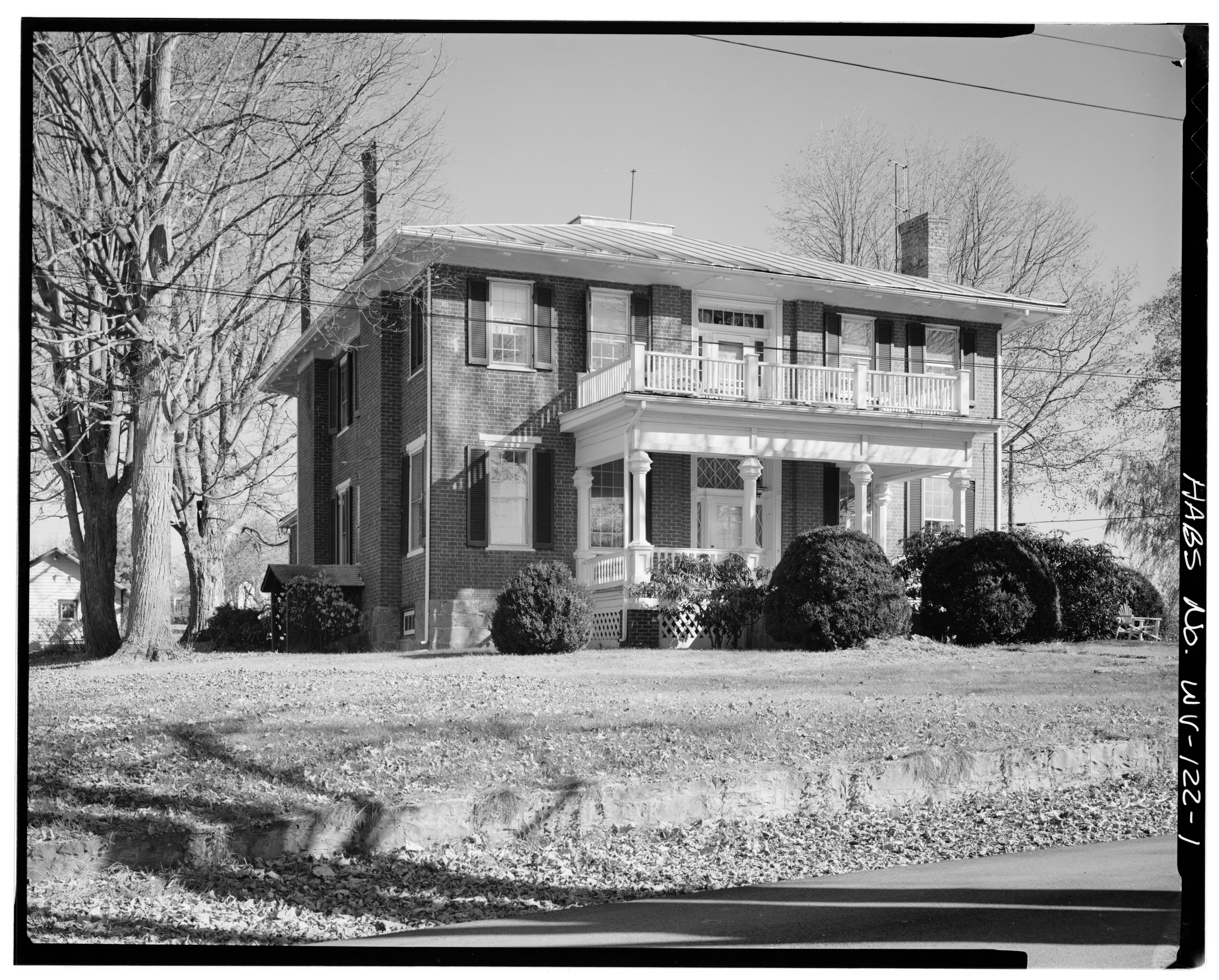
- The house in 1974

- Location within West Virginia Location within the United States
- Location: Pump and 2nd St. N., Union, West Virginia
- Coordinates: 37°35′33″N 80°32′32″W
- Area: 0.5 acres (0.20 ha)
- Built: 1845
- Architectural style: Greek Revival
- NRHP reference No.: 85001415
- Added to NRHP: June 27, 1985

Brig. Gen. John Echols House is a historic home located at Union, Monroe County, West Virginia. It was built between 1845 and 1848, and is a two-story, brick dwelling in the Greek Revival style. The house measures 44 feet, 6 inches, wide and 52 feet long. It features a hipped roof and prominent, exterior side chimneys. Also on the property is a frame, two-story house that appears to have been used for servant's quarters. The house was owned for 20 years by Brig Gen. John Echols (1823–1896), a general in the Confederate States Army during the American Civil War.

It was listed on the National Register of Historic Places in 1985. It is located in the Union Historic District, listed in 1990.
