= Alderson Historic District =

Historic district in West Virginia, United States

- U.S. National Register of Historic Places
- U.S. Historic district
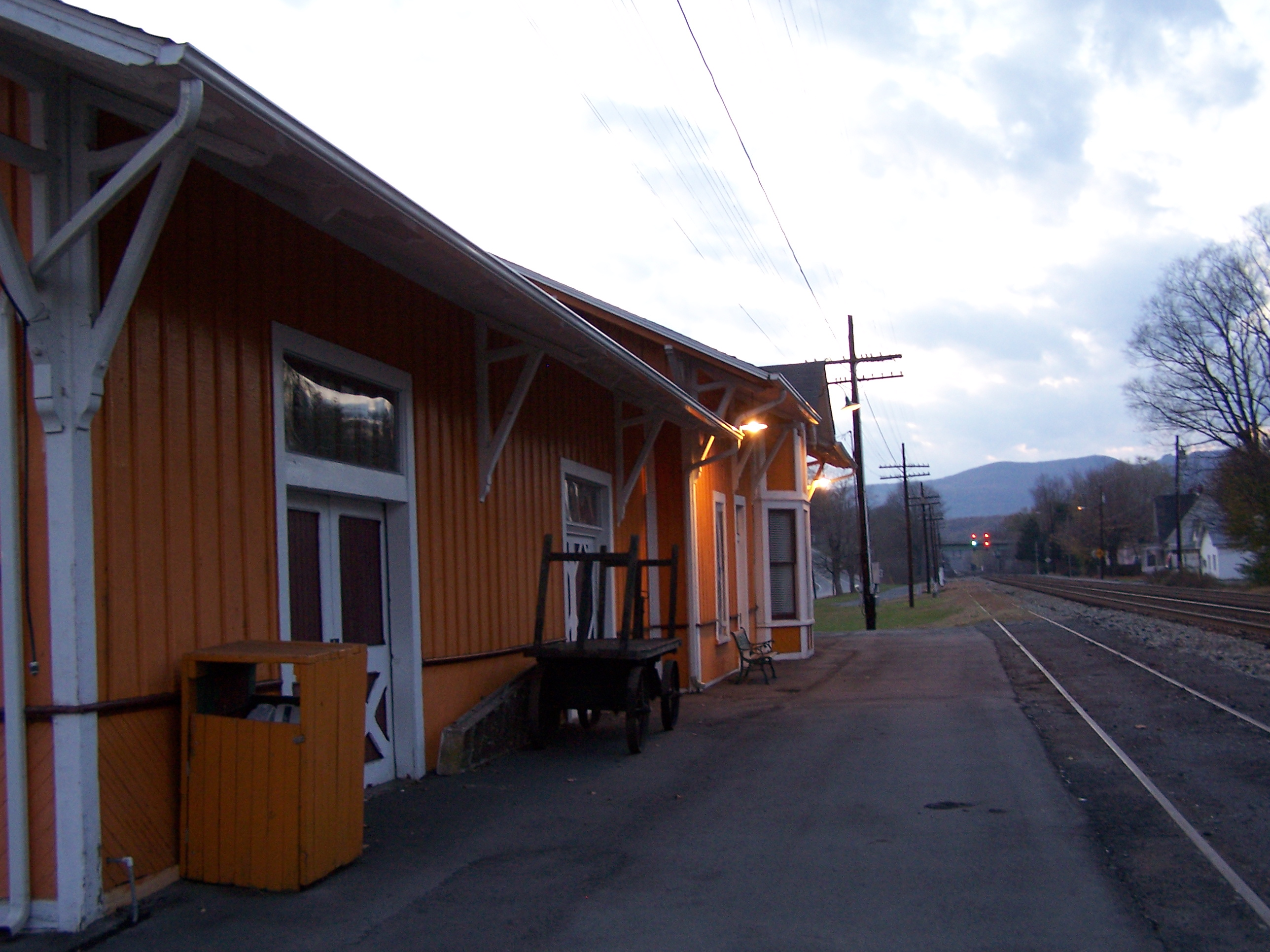
- Chesapeake and Ohio depot, November 2007

- Location within West Virginia Location within the United States
- Location: Roughly, along Monroe St., Riverview Dr., Railroad Ave. and adjacent streets, Alderson, West Virginia
- Coordinates: 37°43′29″N 80°38′32″W
- Area: 139 acres (56 ha)
- Built: 1789
- Built by: Clark Ellis
- Architect: Walter Martens
- Architectural style: Queen Anne, Federal, Greek Revival
- NRHP reference No.: 93001231
- Added to NRHP: November 12, 1993

Alderson Historic District is a national historic district located at Alderson, Greenbrier County and Monroe County, West Virginia. The district encompasses 196 contributing buildings and three contributing sites located in the commercial district and surrounding residential section. They are predominantly 19th and early 20th century frame detached residences and masonry commercial buildings including notable examples of the Federal, Greek Revival, and Queen Anne styles. Notable buildings include the Woodson Mohler Grocery building, Johnson and Gwinn warehouse, Greenbrier Mill, First National Bank building, Alderson's Store, Chesapeake and Ohio depot, U.S. Post Office, and the City Hall (1939). The Alderson Ferry Site is for the ferry established 1789. Located in the district is the separately listed Alderson Bridge.

It was listed on the National Register of Historic Places in 1993.

== Gallery ==
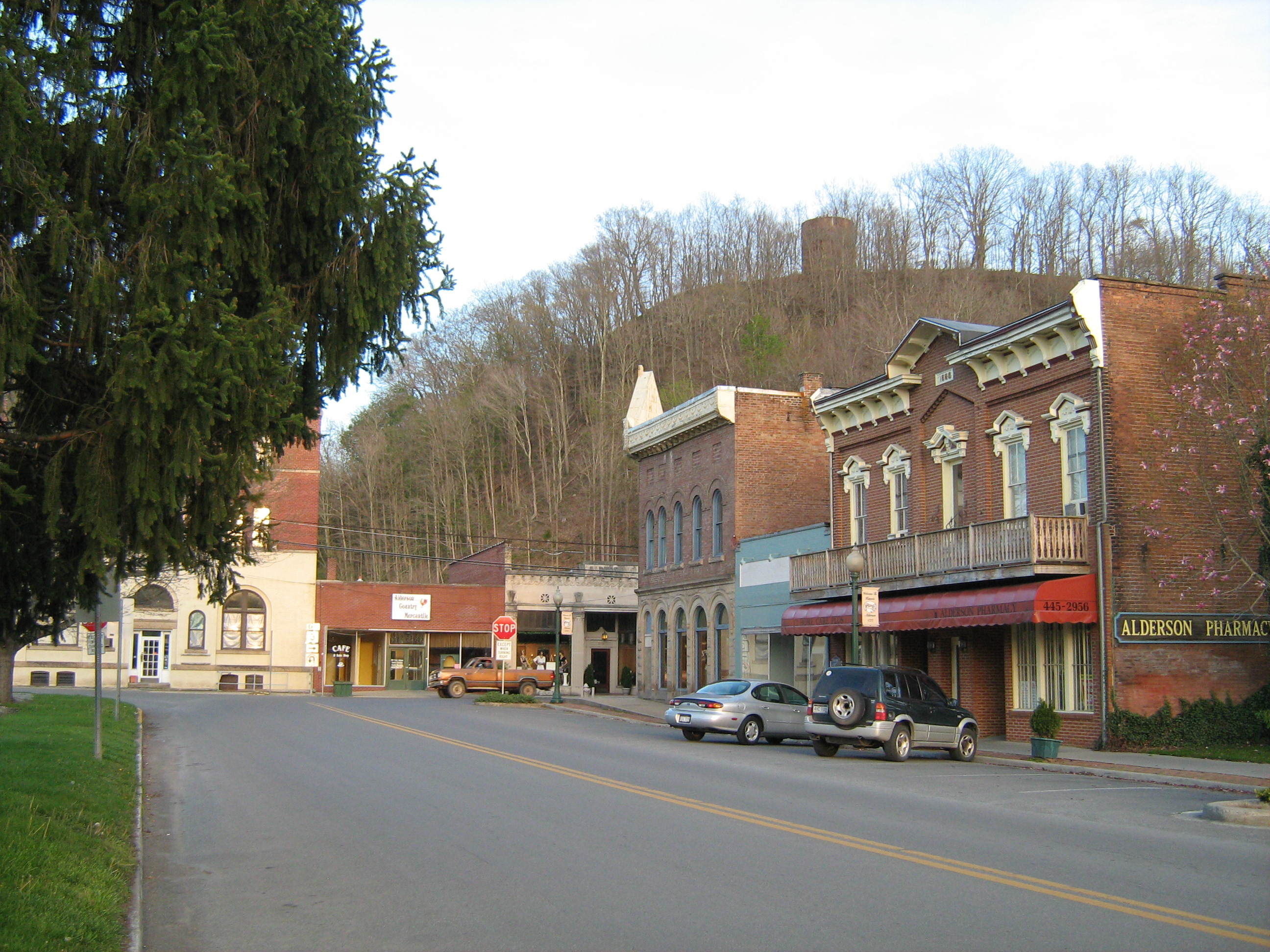
The "historic district" in Alderson, West Virginia (on the Monroe County side of the Greenbrier River), April 2009
