= Cook's Mill =

Historic building in West Virginia, US

- U.S. National Register of Historic Places
- U.S. Historic district
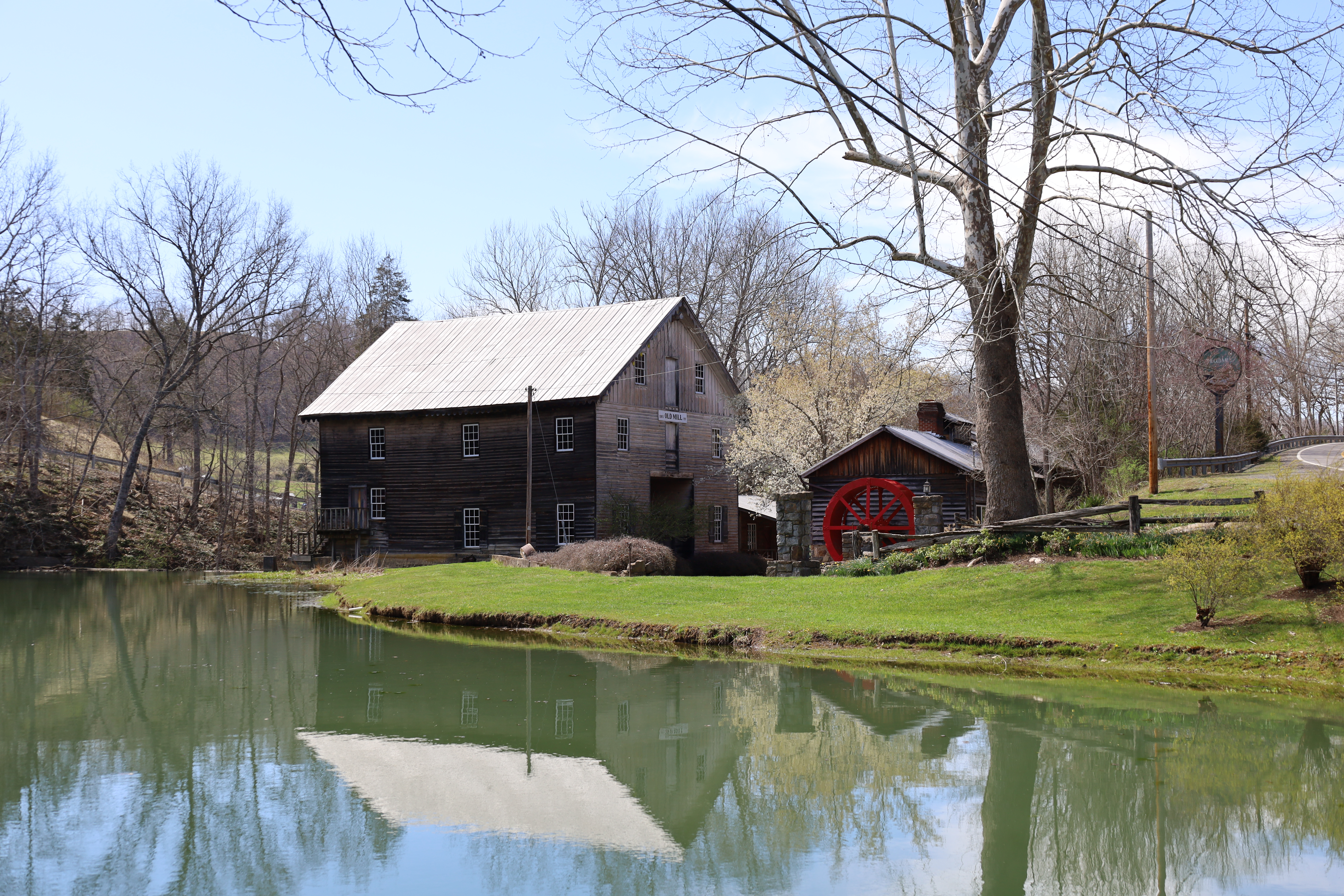
- Cook's Mill in 2022. The mill building (left) dates from 1857, while the forge building (right) was constructed in the late 1980s.

- Location within West Virginia Location within the United States
- Location: County Route 2, near Greenville, West Virginia
- Coordinates: 37°32′42″N 80°41′14″W
- Area: 2 acres (0.81 ha)
- Built: 1857
- Architect: Humphries, James
- NRHP reference No.: 88001857
- Added to NRHP: February 6, 1989

Cook's Mill, also known as The Old Mill and The Greenville Mill, is a historic grist mill and sawmill and national historic district located near Greenville, Monroe County, West Virginia, United States. The district includes one contributing buildings and two contributing structures. The main mill building was built in 1857 on the original stone foundation and site of an earlier mill built in approximately 1796. It is a 2 1/2-story, plus basement, hand-hewn post-and-beam building, with massive timbers pegged at their mortise and tenon joints. The district also includes the dam, mill pond, tail race and stream.

The site also contains several noncontributing structures, including a log house dating from about 1843 that was moved to the site from nearby War Ridge in 1990, and a forge building constructed in the late 1980s.

It was listed on the National Register of Historic Places in 1989.

This is near the original site of Cook's Station (Fort) built by Valentine Cook in the early 1770s. This was the site of the first marriage in that county, of Phillip Hamman and Christina Cook in 1780. He being known as Savior Of The Greenbrier for his run, along with John Pryor, to warn the Greenbrier settlements in 1778 of an impending Indian attack.
