= Alderson Bridge =

- U.S. National Register of Historic Places
- U.S. Historic district – Contributing property
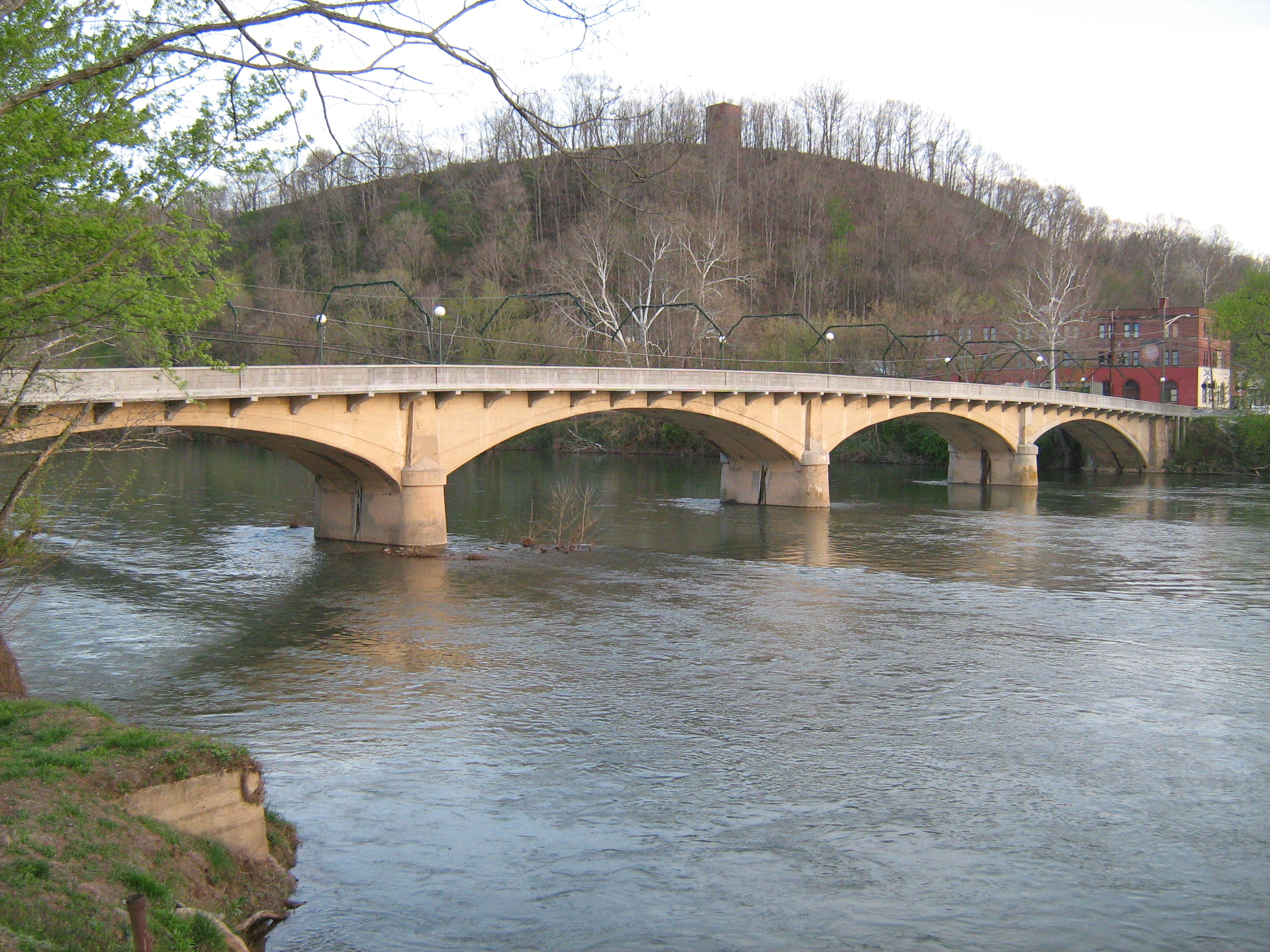
- Alderson Memorial Bridge, April 2009

- Location within West Virginia Location within the United States
- Location: Monroe St. across the Greenbrier R., Alderson, West Virginia
- Coordinates: 37°43′29″N 80°38′36″W
- Area: 0.2 acres (0.081 ha)
- Built: 1914
- Architect: McEnteer, Frank Duff
- Architectural style: Concrete arch bridge
- NRHP reference No.: 91001730
- Added to NRHP: December 4, 1991

The Alderson Bridge, also known as Alderson Memorial Bridge, is a historic concrete arch bridge in Alderson, West Virginia. It crosses the Greenbrier River, which separates Greenbrier and Monroe counties. The bridge once carried Monroe Street but is now closed to vehicular traffic (open to pedestrians). It was built in 1914, and measures 21 feet wide including the walkways and 453 feet long.

It was listed on the National Register of Historic Places in 1991. It is located in the Alderson Historic District, listed in 1993.
