= Sunset Hill (Alderson, West Virginia) =

Historic house in West Virginia, United States

- U.S. National Register of Historic Places
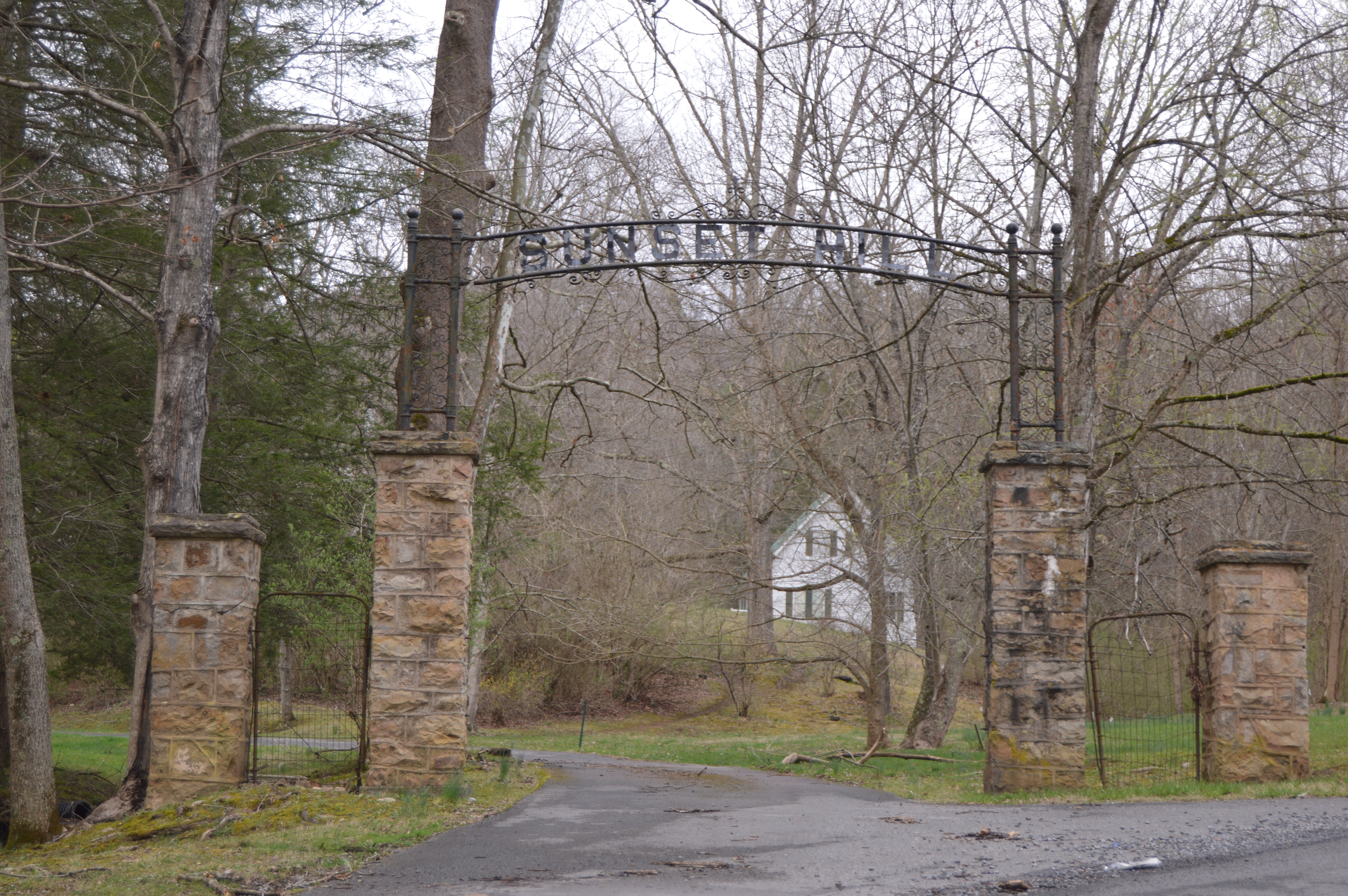
- Property entrance

- Location within West Virginia Location within the United States
- Location: Flat Mountain Rd., Alderson, West Virginia
- Coordinates: 37°42′32″N 80°38′18″W
- Area: 321.9 acres (130.3 ha)
- Built: 1880
- Architectural style: I-house
- NRHP reference No.: 00000777
- Added to NRHP: July 14, 2000

"Sunset Hill", also known as the Alderson Home, is a historic home located at Alderson, Monroe County, West Virginia. The main farmhouse was built in 1880, and is a two-story I house with side gables and a two-story ell. The front facade features a gable portico supported by four Doric order columns. Also on the property are a contributing cottage (c. 1900), privy built by the Works Progress Administration (c. 1935–1936), barn (c. 1900), cistern (c. 1880), and entrance gates (c. 1925).

It was listed on the National Register of Historic Places in 2000.
