= Reed's Mill =

- U.S. National Register of Historic Places
- U.S. Historic district
- Location within West Virginia Location within the United States
- Location: Co. Rd. 219/1, Secondcreek, West Virginia
- Coordinates: 37°40′2″N 80°27′23″W
- Area: 3.2 acres (1.3 ha)
- Built: 1914
- Built by: Archiball McDowell
- Architectural style: Timber frame construction
- NRHP reference No.: 93000226
- Added to NRHP: April 9, 1993

Reed's Mill is a historic grist mill and national historic district located at Secondcreek, Monroe County, West Virginia. The district includes two contributing buildings and eight contributing structures. It was one of the original mill complexes of Secondcreek. The main mill building was built about 1791, and is a mortise and tenon frame structure held together with wooden pins, and sits atop a raised cut stone basement. A tall three-story section with basement was added in 1949. The district also includes the mill dam, wing-dam, mill race lined with rock and ending in the mill pond, and concrete mill race that carries water to the turbine (1872) which operates the grinding wheels in the mill. It remains an operating mill.

It was listed on the National Register of Historic Places in 1993.

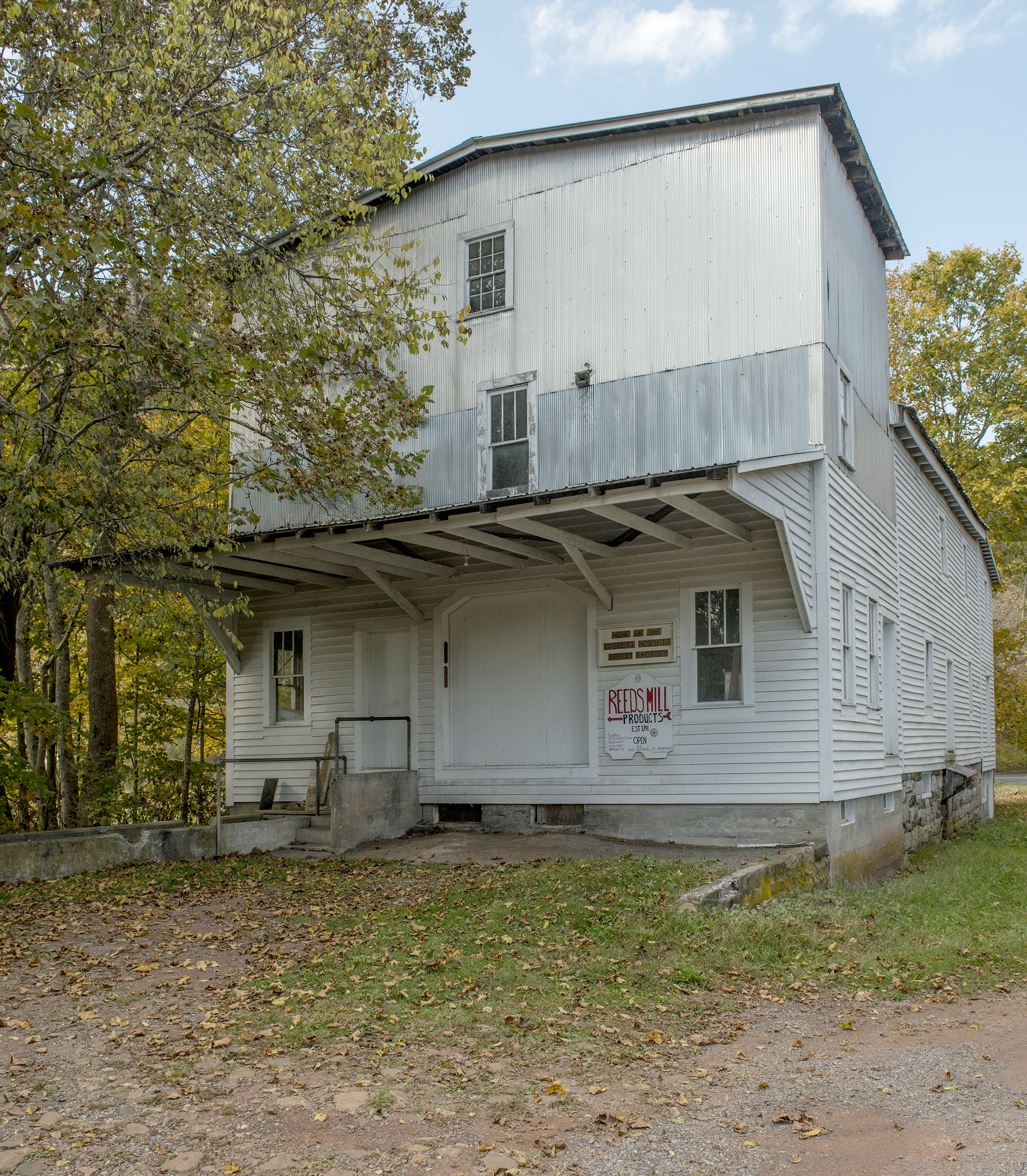
Reed's Mill

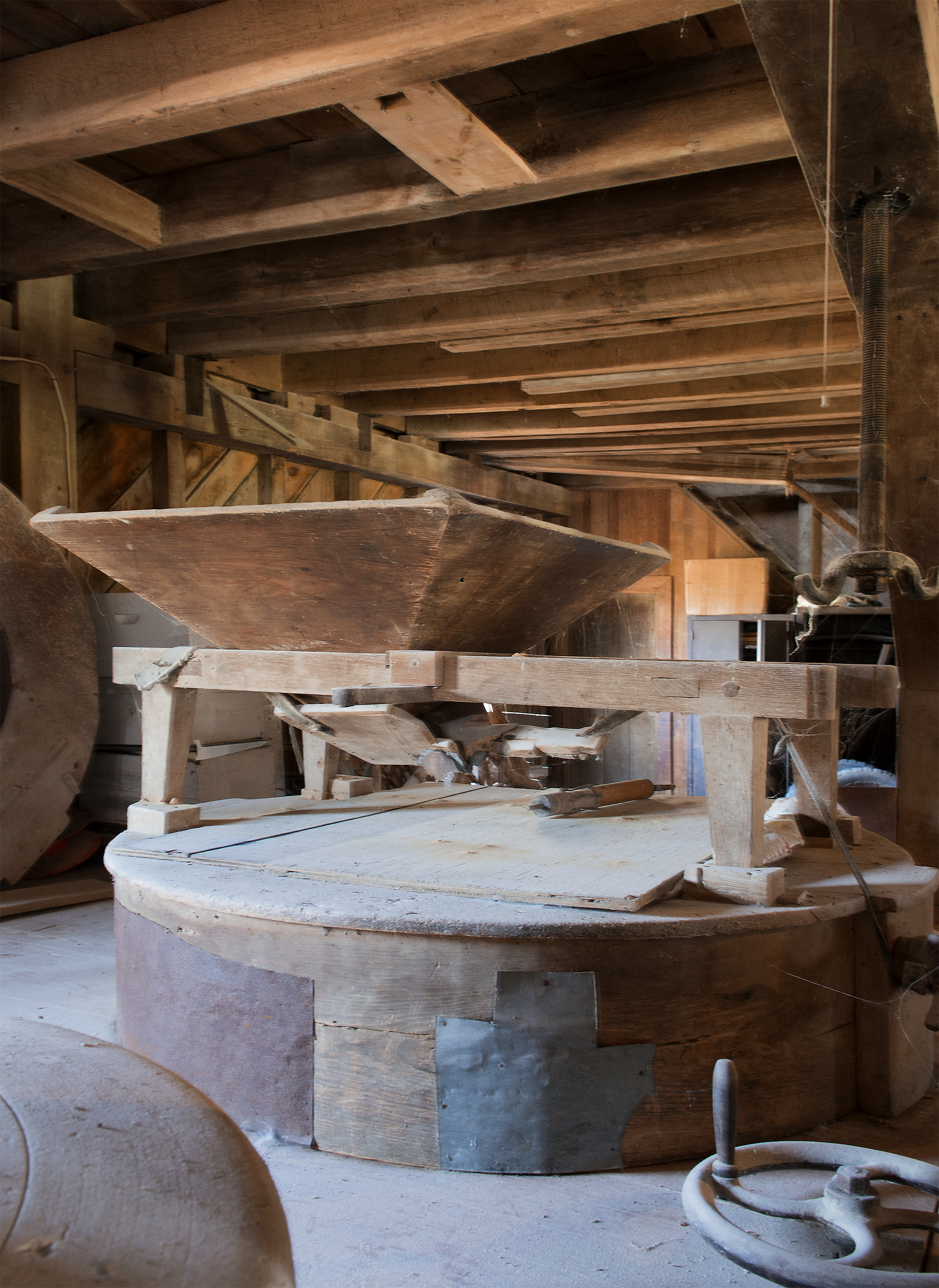
Interior of the Mill
