= Secondcreek, West Virginia =

- Unincorporated community
- Location within West Virginia Location within the United States
- Coordinates: 37°39′55″N 80°27′14″W
- Country: United States
- State: West Virginia
- County: Monroe
- Elevation: 1,873 ft (571 m)
- Time zone: UTC-5 (Eastern (EST))
  - Summer (DST): UTC-4 (EDT)
- ZIP code: 24974
- Area codes: 304 & 681
- GNIS feature ID: 1555586

Secondcreek is an unincorporated community in Monroe County, West Virginia, United States. Secondcreek is northeast of Union. The ZIP code for Secondcreek is 24974; however the post office was closed in 2010.

The community was named after nearby Second Creek.

== Resource and Heritage ==
Second Creek is an excellent trout stream although the native brook trout is in greatly reduced numbers compared to the brown trout and rainbow trout recently introduced. Rodgers Mill is a fly fishing only site. Second Creek is stocked every April. Fly anglers can access the waters using County Route 219/3 and County Route 3/7 from US Route 219.

At one time in its history, more than twenty mills for powder, grist, lumbering and finishing were on this creek.

Reed's Mill and the Nickell Homestead and Mill are listed on the National Register of Historic Places.
