= Union Historic District =

Historic district in West Virginia, United States

- U.S. National Register of Historic Places
- U.S. Historic district
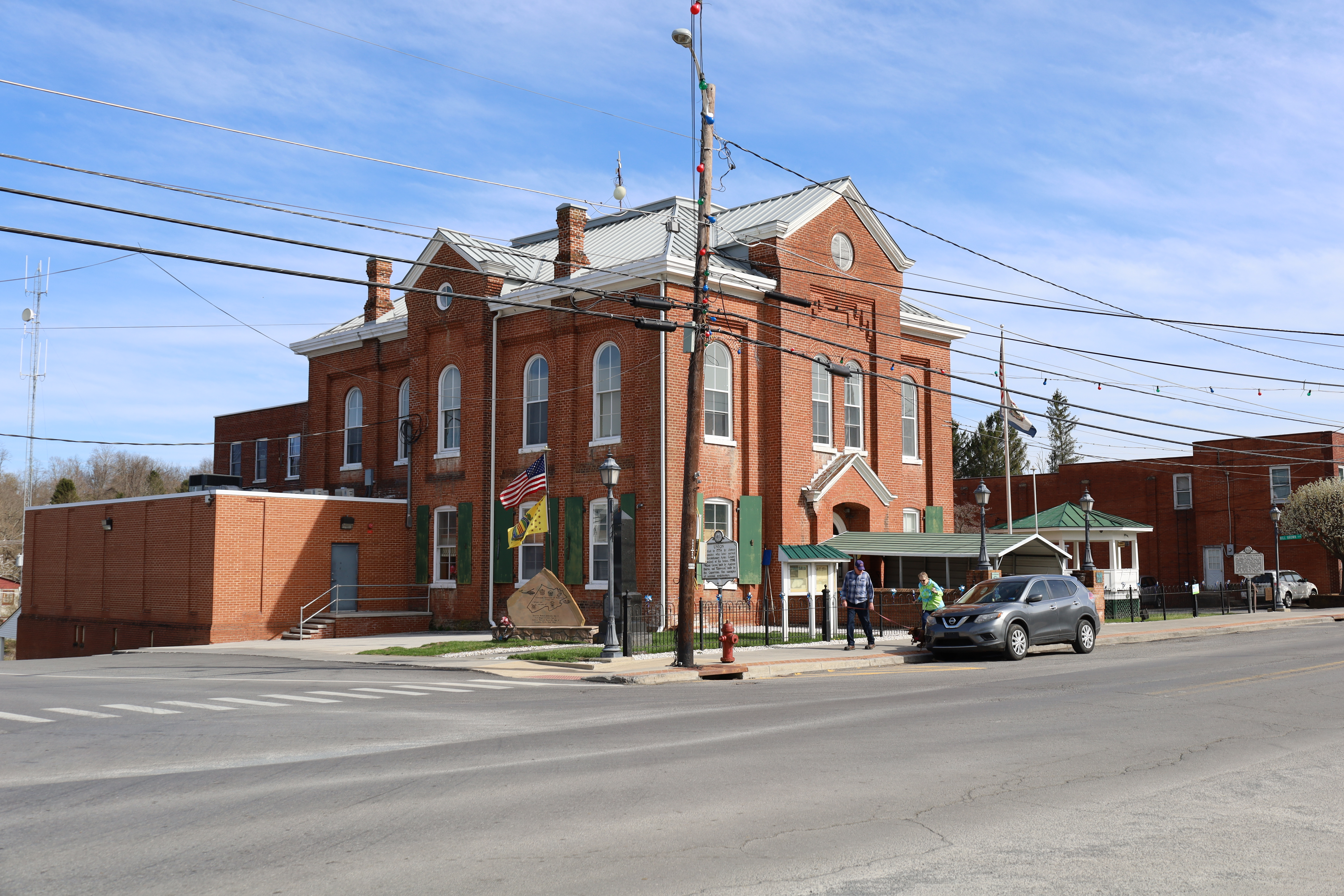
- Monroe County Courthouse in 2022

- Location within West Virginia Location within the United States
- Location: Roughly along Main, Dunlap, Pump and Elmwood Sts. N from Royal Oak Field, including Paradise and Monument Fields, Union, West Virginia
- Coordinates: 37°35′35″N 80°32′25″W
- Area: 175 acres (71 ha)
- Architectural style: Bungalow/craftsman, Greek Revival, Queen Anne
- NRHP reference No.: 90001844
- Added to NRHP: December 6, 1990

Union Historic District is a national historic district located at Union, Monroe County, West Virginia. The district includes 174 contributing buildings, 2 contributing sites, 7 contributing structures, and 1 contributing object in the Union and surrounding areas.

Notable properties include the Monroe County Courthouse (c. 1882), Union High School (1939), Monroe County Confederate Monument (1901), Monroe Department Store (1898), Watchman Office (c. 1870), Union Presbyterian Church (1922), Union United Methodist Church (c. 1889), old Baptist Church (c. 1845), All Saints Episcopal Church (c. 1873), old brick Methodist Church (c. 1831), old Union Academy (c. 1820), and Old Temperance Hall (c. 1849). Located in the district are the separately listed Elmwood, Walnut Grove and Brig. Gen. John Echols House.

It was listed on the National Register of Historic Places in 1990.

== Gallery ==
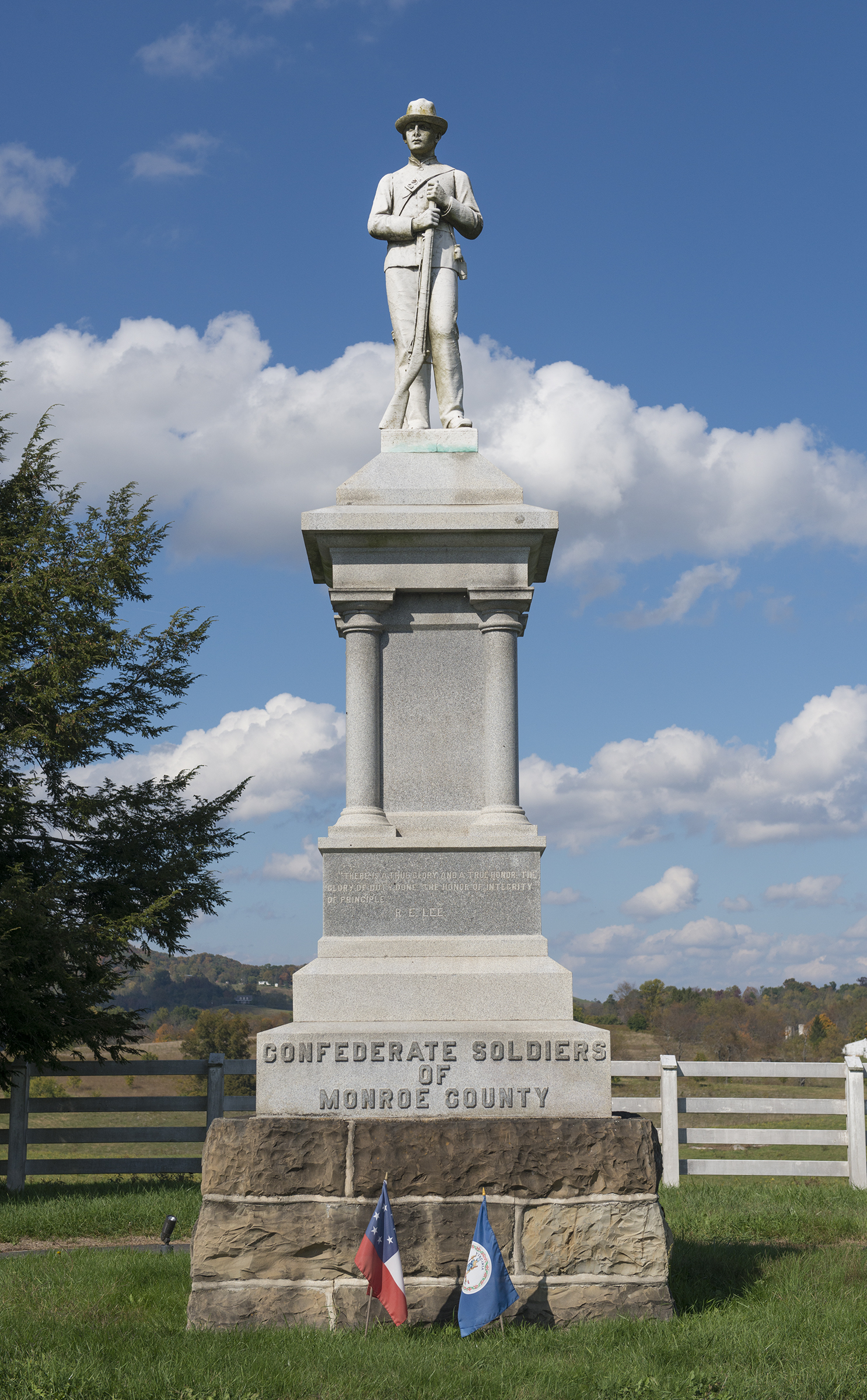
Statue in Confederate Memorial Park

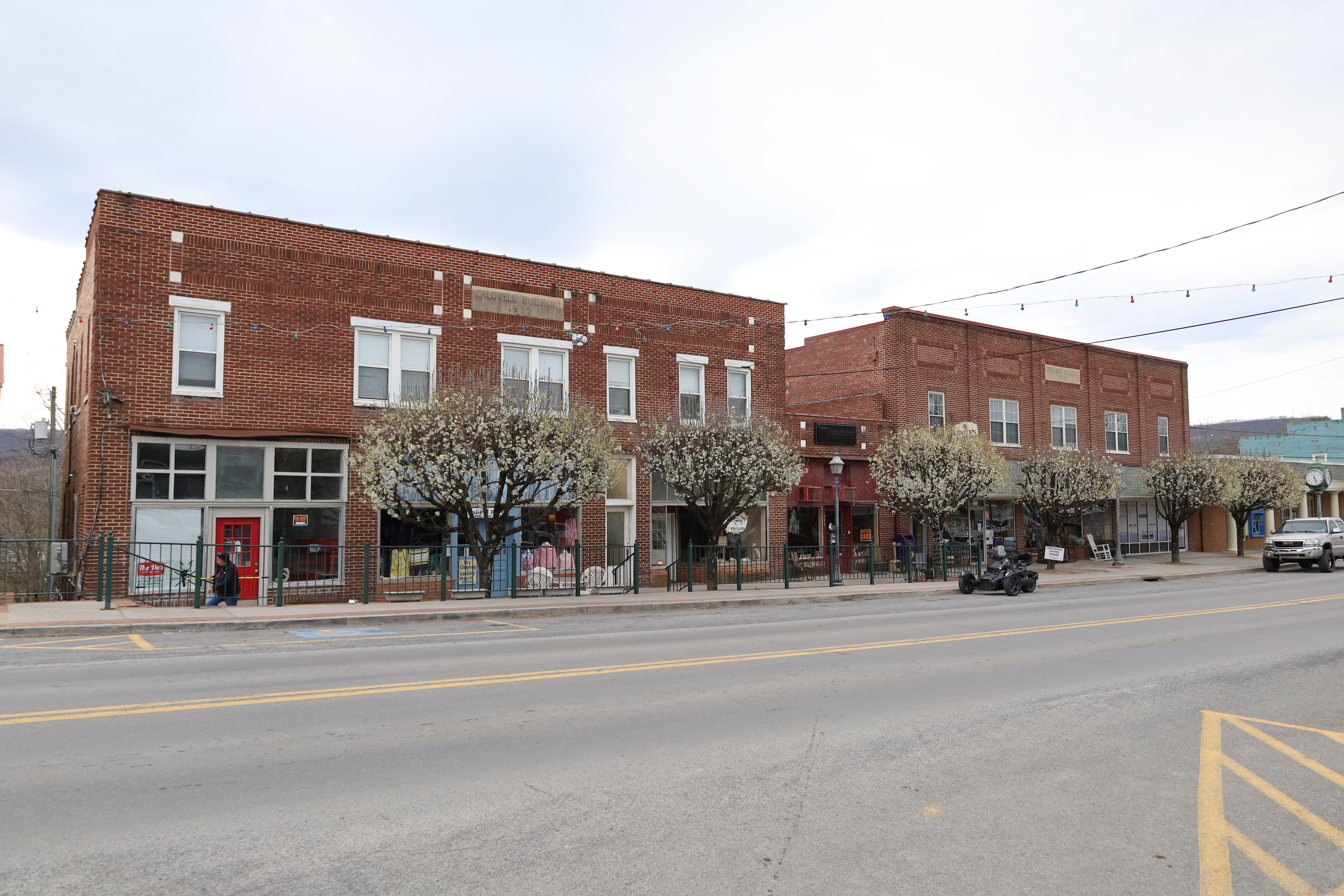
Commercial buildings in the district

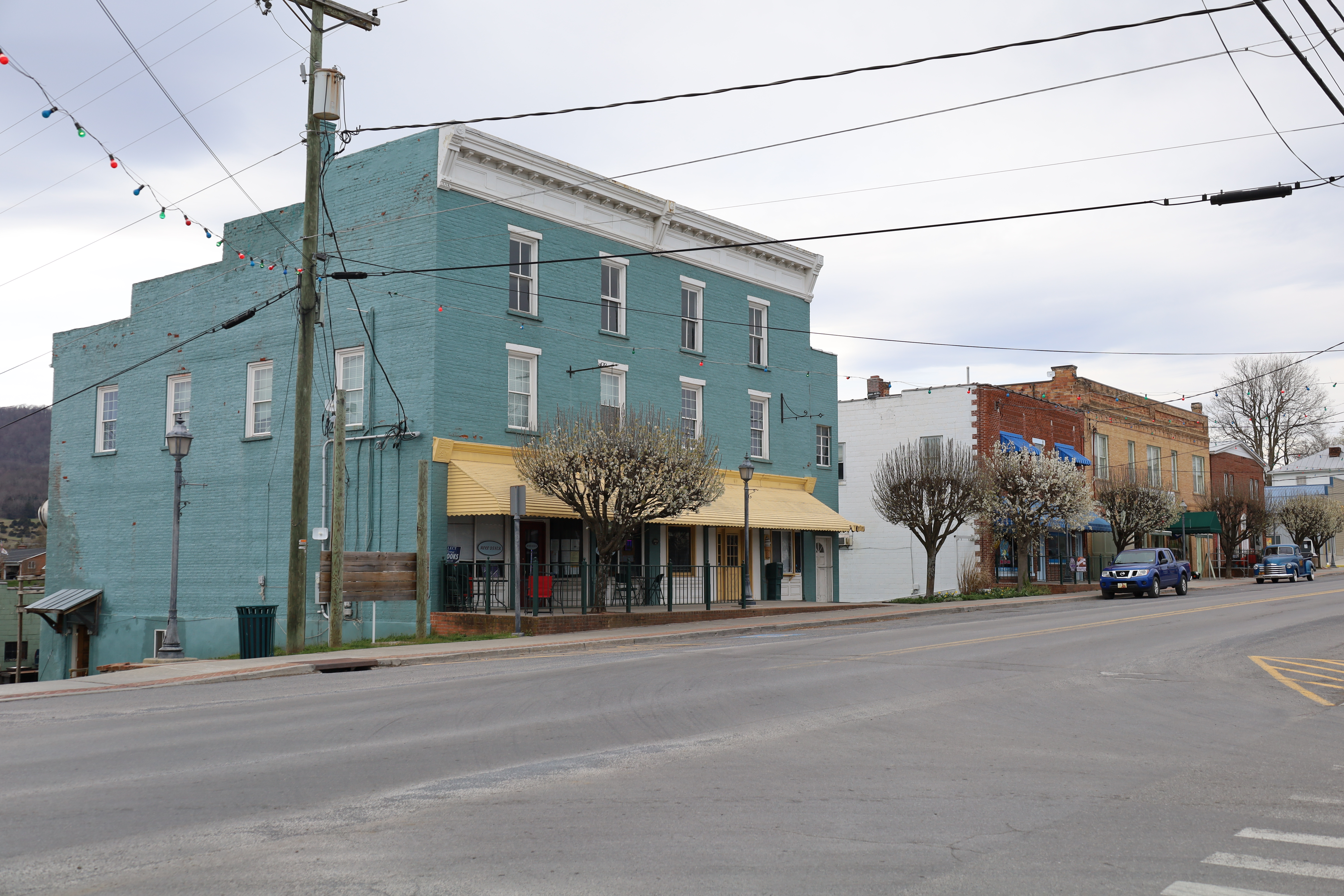
Commercial buildings in the district

Clark-Wiseman House

Ames-Clair Hall
