= Alderson, West Virginia =

- Town
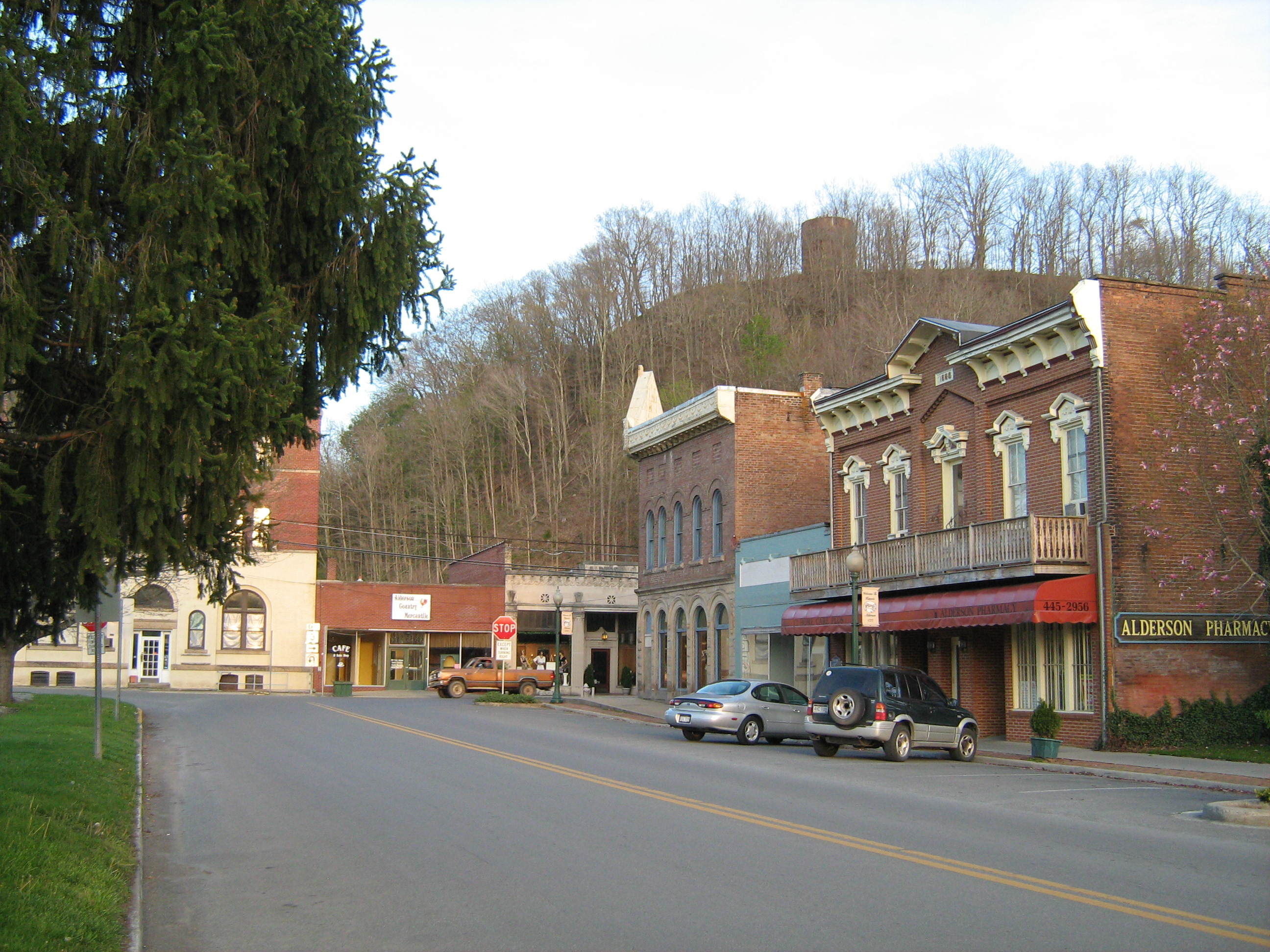
- Historic section on the Monroe County side

- Flag Seal Logo

- Location within Greenbrier and Monroe Counties and West Virginia

- Location within West Virginia Location within the United States Location within North America
- Coordinates: 37°43′40″N 80°38′37″W
- Country: United States
- State: West Virginia
- Counties: Greenbrier, Monroe
- Incorporated: 1881

Government
  - Mayor: Travis Lee Copenhaver

Area
  - Total: 0.95 sq mi (2.47 km^{2})
  - Land: 0.89 sq mi (2.31 km^{2})
  - Water: 0.062 sq mi (0.16 km^{2})
- Elevation: 1,549 ft (472 m)

Population (2020)
  - Total: 975
  - Estimate (2021): 966
  - Density: 1,090/sq mi (422/km^{2})
- Time zone: UTC-5 (Eastern (EST))
  - Summer (DST): UTC-4 (EDT)
- ZIP code: 24910
- Area code: 304
- FIPS code: 54-00772
- GNIS feature ID: 2390700
- Website: aldersonwv.org

Alderson is a town in Greenbrier and Monroe counties in the U.S. state of West Virginia, on both sides of the Greenbrier River. The population was 975 at the 2020 census.

== History ==
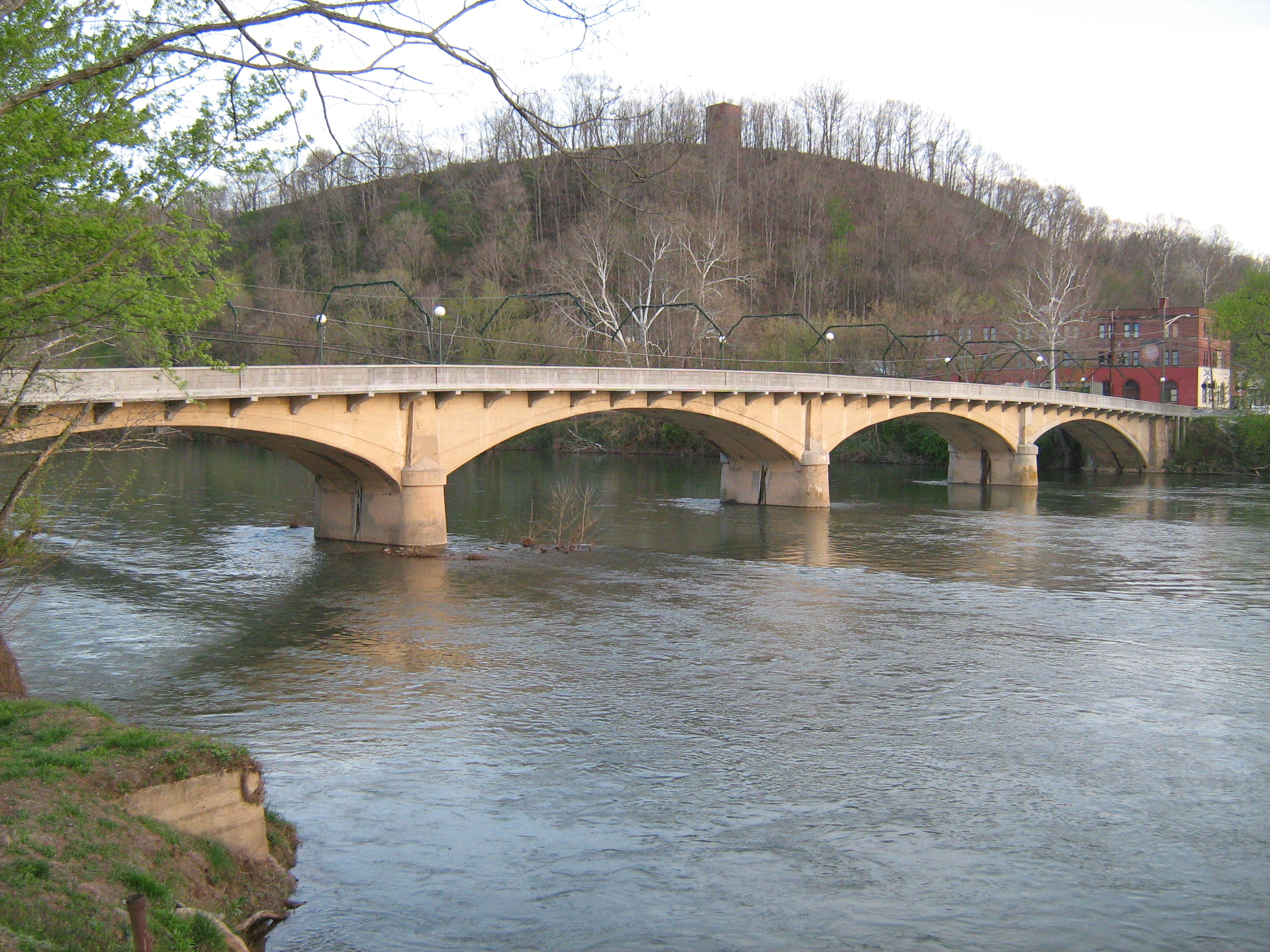
The historic 1914 Alderson Memorial Bridge

Alderson is a community located along the Greenbrier River in Greenbrier County and Monroe County, incorporated in 1881.

In 1763, the nearby Muddy Creek settlements were destroyed by Shawnee Indians under Chief Cornstalk.

Alderson was originally settled in 1777 by "Elder" John Alderson, a frontier missionary for whom the town is named, who organized the first Baptist church in the Greenbrier Valley.

Alderson became an important livestock shipping point on the Chesapeake and Ohio Railway.

Alderson is the location of the Federal Reformatory for Women, which opened in 1927 as the first federal prison for women.

During the early 1900s, Alderson became a hub of higher education in the state. It was home to three separate institutions of higher education, including the Alderson Academy and Junior College, which eventually was integrated into Alderson-Broaddus College in 1932.

The Alexander McVeigh Miller House in Greenbrier County is listed on the National Register of Historic Places, as is Sunset Hill in Monroe County. The Alderson Bridge and Alderson Historic District are located in both counties.

== Geography ==
According to the United States Census Bureau, the town has a total area of 0.95 square miles (2.46 km^{2}), of which 0.89 square miles (2.31 km^{2}) is land and 0.06 square miles (0.16 km^{2}) is water.

=== Climate ===
Climate data for Alderson, West Virginia (1991–2020 normals, extremes 1944–present)
| Month | Jan | Feb | Mar | Apr | May | Jun | Jul | Aug | Sep | Oct | Nov | Dec | Year |
|---|---|---|---|---|---|---|---|---|---|---|---|---|---|
| Record high °F (°C) | 78 (26) | 79 (26) | 88 (31) | 91 (33) | 96 (36) | 96 (36) | 102 (39) | 98 (37) | 99 (37) | 94 (34) | 85 (29) | 78 (26) | 102 (39) |
| Mean daily maximum °F (°C) | 41.3 (5.2) | 45.4 (7.4) | 54.0 (12.2) | 66.4 (19.1) | 74.6 (23.7) | 81.0 (27.2) | 84.3 (29.1) | 83.4 (28.6) | 78.2 (25.7) | 67.8 (19.9) | 55.4 (13.0) | 44.7 (7.1) | 64.7 (18.2) |
| Daily mean °F (°C) | 31.4 (−0.3) | 34.6 (1.4) | 41.8 (5.4) | 52.6 (11.4) | 61.7 (16.5) | 69.3 (20.7) | 73.1 (22.8) | 71.9 (22.2) | 65.9 (18.8) | 54.3 (12.4) | 42.9 (6.1) | 34.9 (1.6) | 52.9 (11.6) |
| Mean daily minimum °F (°C) | 21.5 (−5.8) | 23.9 (−4.5) | 29.6 (−1.3) | 38.9 (3.8) | 48.7 (9.3) | 57.5 (14.2) | 61.8 (16.6) | 60.3 (15.7) | 53.5 (11.9) | 40.8 (4.9) | 30.4 (−0.9) | 25.0 (−3.9) | 41.0 (5.0) |
| Record low °F (°C) | −9 (−23) | −12 (−24) | 0 (−18) | 13 (−11) | 24 (−4) | 37 (3) | 40 (4) | 42 (6) | 31 (−1) | 11 (−12) | 6 (−14) | −8 (−22) | −12 (−24) |
| Average precipitation inches (mm) | 3.02 (77) | 2.88 (73) | 3.81 (97) | 3.57 (91) | 4.42 (112) | 3.71 (94) | 4.21 (107) | 3.13 (80) | 3.35 (85) | 2.62 (67) | 2.55 (65) | 3.39 (86) | 40.66 (1,033) |
| Average snowfall inches (cm) | 3.6 (9.1) | 4.2 (11) | 2.0 (5.1) | 0.1 (0.25) | 0.0 (0.0) | 0.0 (0.0) | 0.0 (0.0) | 0.0 (0.0) | 0.0 (0.0) | 0.1 (0.25) | 0.2 (0.51) | 2.0 (5.1) | 12.2 (31) |
| Average precipitation days (≥ 0.01 in) | 11.1 | 10.2 | 11.6 | 11.2 | 12.3 | 10.9 | 11.1 | 10.2 | 8.0 | 7.7 | 8.0 | 11.2 | 123.5 |
| Average snowy days (≥ 0.1 in) | 2.2 | 2.2 | 1.1 | 0.1 | 0.0 | 0.0 | 0.0 | 0.0 | 0.0 | 0.0 | 0.2 | 1.3 | 7.1 |
Source: NOAA

== Demographics ==
Historical population
| Census | Pop. | Note | %± |
|---|---|---|---|
| 1880 | 478 | | — |
| 1890 | 663 | | 38.7% |
| 1900 | 518 | | −21.9% |
| 1910 | 1,252 | | 141.7% |
| 1920 | 1,401 | | 11.9% |
| 1930 | 1,458 | | 4.1% |
| 1940 | 1,493 | | 2.4% |
| 1950 | 1,489 | | −0.3% |
| 1960 | 1,225 | | −17.7% |
| 1970 | 1,278 | | 4.3% |
| 1980 | 1,375 | | 7.6% |
| 1990 | 1,152 | | −16.2% |
| 2000 | 1,091 | | −5.3% |
| 2010 | 1,184 | | 8.5% |
| 2020 | 975 | | −17.7% |
| 2021 (est.) | 966 | ▼ | −0.9% |
U.S. Decennial Census

=== 2010 census ===
As of the census of 2010, there were 1,184 people, 518 households, and 315 families living in the town. The population density was 1,330.3 inhabitants per square mile (513.6/km^{2}). There were 602 housing units at an average density of 676.4 per square mile (261.2/km^{2}). The racial makeup of the town was 91.0% White, 5.0% African American, 0.3% Native American, 0.3% Asian, and 3.5% from two or more races. Hispanic or Latino of any race were 2.9% of the population.

There were 518 households, of which 26.6% had children under the age of 18 living with them, 39.2% were married couples living together, 14.9% had a female householder with no husband present, 6.8% had a male householder with no wife present, and 39.2% were non-families. 31.9% of all households were made up of individuals, and 17.2% had someone living alone who was 65 years of age or older. The average household size was 2.29 and the average family size was 2.83.

The median age in the town was 42.8 years. 20.4% of residents were under the age of 18; 9.7% were between the ages of 18 and 24; 22.8% were from 25 to 44; 27.5% were from 45 to 64; and 19.7% were 65 years of age or older. The gender makeup of the town was 48.9% male and 51.1% female.

=== 2000 census ===
As of the census of 2000, there were 1,091 people, 481 households, and 305 families living in the town. The population density was 1,214.5 inhabitants per square mile (468.0/km^{2}). There were 586 housing units at an average density of 652.3 per square mile (251.4/km^{2}). The racial makeup of the town was 90.83% White, 6.60% African American, 0.27% Native American, 0.18% Asian, and 2.11% from two or more races. Hispanic or Latino of any race were 1.10% of the population.

There were 481 households, out of which 25.8% had children under the age of 18 living with them, 43.0% were married couples living together, 16.0% had a female householder with no husband present, and 36.4% were non-families. 34.5% of all households were made up of individuals, and 17.5% had someone living alone who was 65 years of age or older. The average household size was 2.27 and the average family size was 2.87.

In the town, the population was spread out, with 23.8% under the age of 18, 8.0% from 18 to 24, 22.9% from 25 to 44, 23.6% from 45 to 64, and 21.7% who were 65 years of age or older. The median age was 41 years. For every 100 females, there were 90.4 males. For every 100 females age 18 and over, there were 83.4 males.

The median income for a household in the town was $23,043, and the median income for a family was $29,028. Males had a median income of $31,000 versus $20,938 for females. The per capita income for the town was $14,474. About 17.8% of families and 22.9% of the population were below the poverty line, including 35.7% of those under age 18 and 9.6% of those aged 65 or over.

== Economy ==
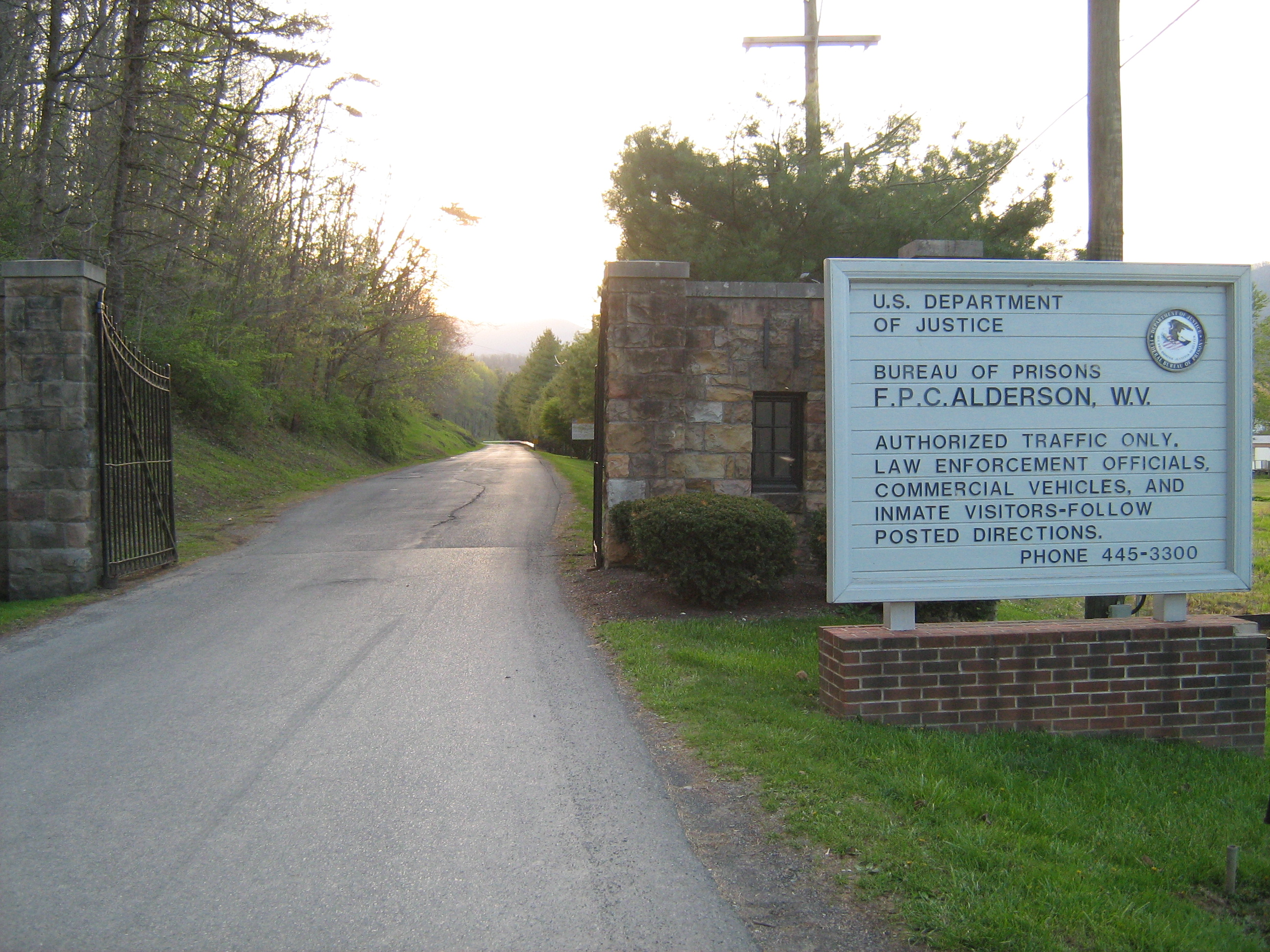
Federal Prison Camp, Alderson is the largest employer in the Alderson area

The Federal Bureau of Prisons facility Federal Prison Camp, Alderson, where media mogul Martha Stewart was imprisoned, is the largest employer in Alderson. A portion of FPC Alderson is located in unincorporated Monroe County, while the other portion of the prison lies in unincorporated Summers County.

The Alderson Federal Prison Camp is located on the spot on which the earliest settlers of the area chose to settle and called their settlement Baughman's Fort. Baughman's Fort was built in the 1750s, and the settlement was supposedly destroyed by Native Americans shortly thereafter, though no factual evidence exists to support this theory. Few archaeological remains of the early fort remain after the building of the Federal Prison Camp in the early 20th century. Only notations in early journals refer to the location of the fort.

Betty Alderson, who is married to a descendant of the founders of Alderson, stated, "Every business profited" when Martha Stewart was incarcerated at Alderson, and media attention was focused on the community. Residents planted bulbs into a garden that was to be named "Martha's Garden."

== Transportation ==
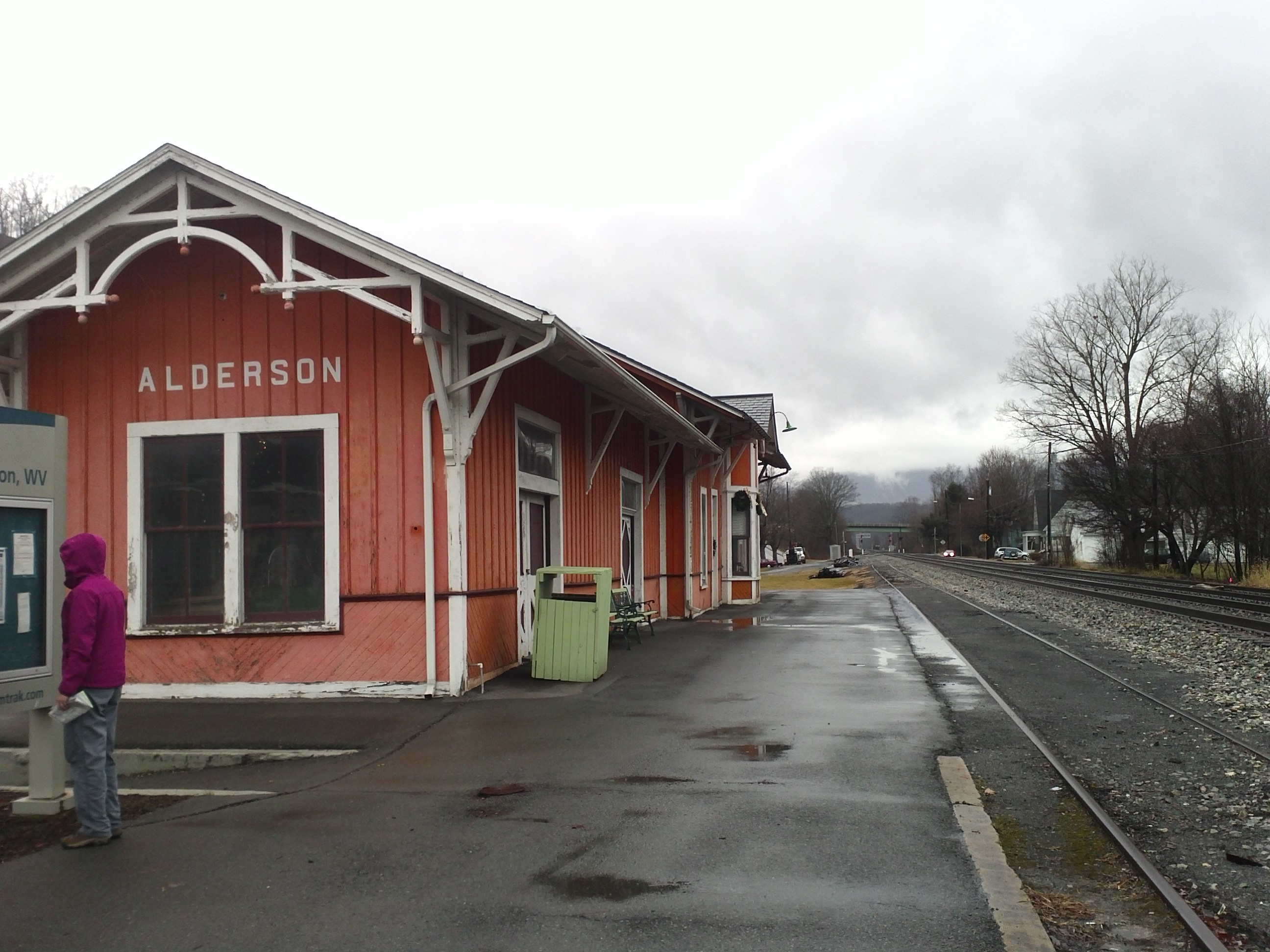
The Alderson, WV train station served by Amtrak.

Amtrak, the national passenger rail service, provides request stop service to Alderson. There is only one platform located at 1 C&O Plaza on Railroad Avenue. It is served by the Cardinal route.

== Local events ==
"Alderson has gained fame for its elaborate Fourth of July festivities, as much a fitting celebration of small-town America as it is an observance of the nation's holiday." It is also one of the oldest celebrations in the state. It currently has one of the largest Fourth of July celebrations in West Virginia, attracting approximately 15,000 people during the parade. It is unique by offering many family activities. Over six days, events include a fireman's rodeo, band shows, a car show, various races on the Greenbrier River, as well as a parade and fireworks.

The Alderson Strawberry Festival began in 2016 and occurs annually during Memorial Day weekend. This festival celebrates strawberries, and the local farmers provide the strawberries for the event.

== Notable people ==
- Mittie Frances Clarke Point wrote many of her novels here at "The Cedars".
- Ada Beatrice Queen Victoria Louise Virginia Smith, better known as Bricktop (August 14, 1894 – February 1, 1984) was an American dancer, singer, vaudevillian, and self-described saloon-keeper who owned the nightclub Chez Bricktop in Paris from 1924 to 1961, as well as clubs in Mexico City and Rome. She has been called "...one of the most legendary and enduring figures of 20th-century American cultural history.
