= Morgantown metropolitan area =

Coordinates: 39°30′N 79°45′W

Morgantown Metropolitan Area Morgantown, WV Metropolitan Statistical Area
- Metropolitan Statistical Area
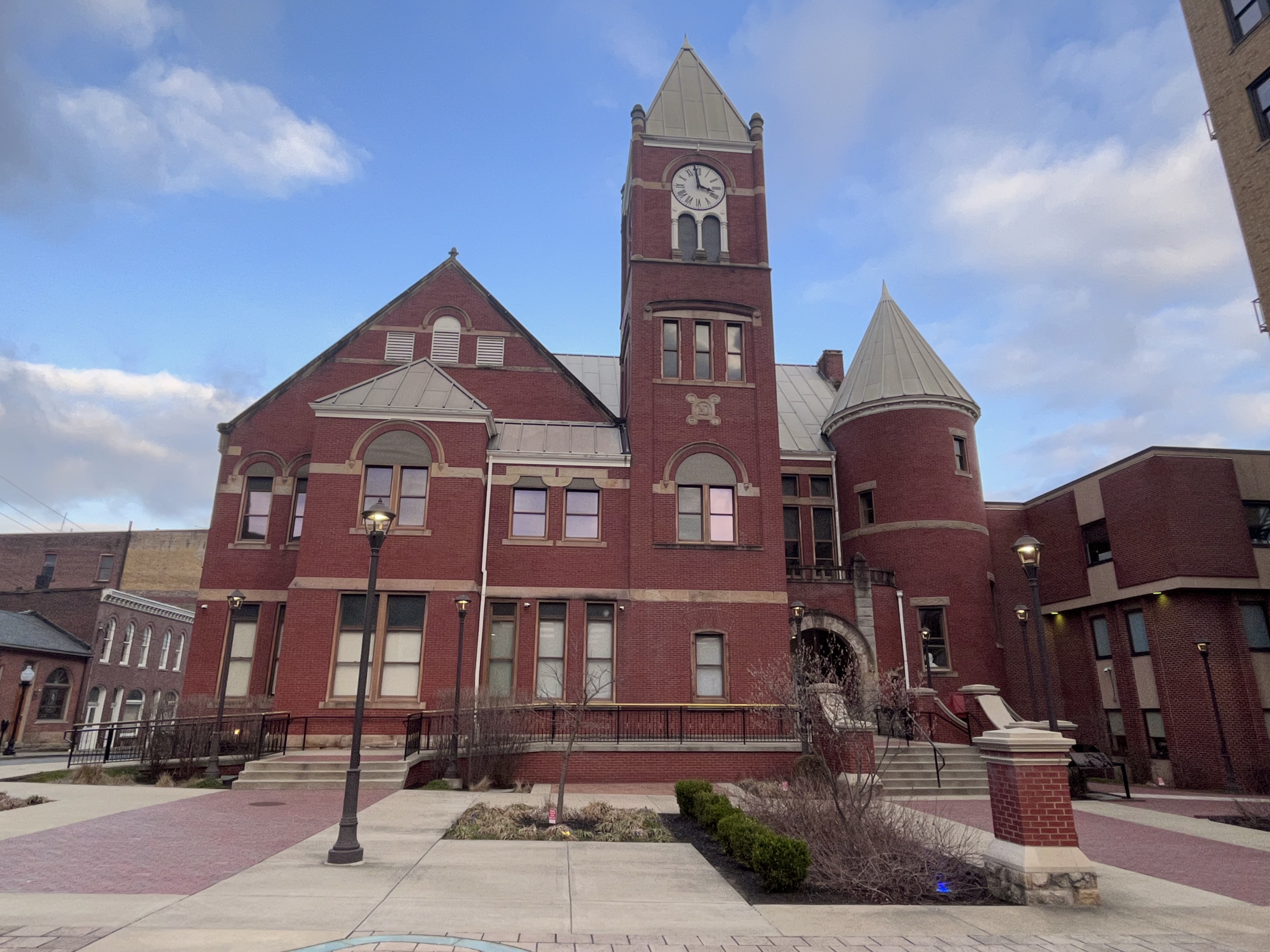
- Monongalia County Courthouse
Interactive Map of Morgantown, WV MSA
City of Morgantown
Morgantown, WV MSA
- Country: United States
- State: West Virginia
- Largest city: Morgantown
- Time zone: UTC−5 (EST)
  - Summer (DST): UTC−4 (EDT)

The Morgantown Metropolitan Statistical Area, as defined by the United States Census Bureau, is an area consisting of two counties in North-Central West Virginia, anchored by the city of Morgantown. As of the 2020 census, the MSA had a population of 140,038.

== Counties ==
Morgantown Metropolitan Area
County	2020 Census	2010 Census	Change
Monongalia County	105,822	96,189	+10.01%
Preston County	34,216	33,520	+2.08%
Total	140,038	129,709	+7.96%

== Communities ==
=== Incorporated places and CDPs ===
- Places with more than 30,000 inhabitants
  - Morgantown (Principal city)

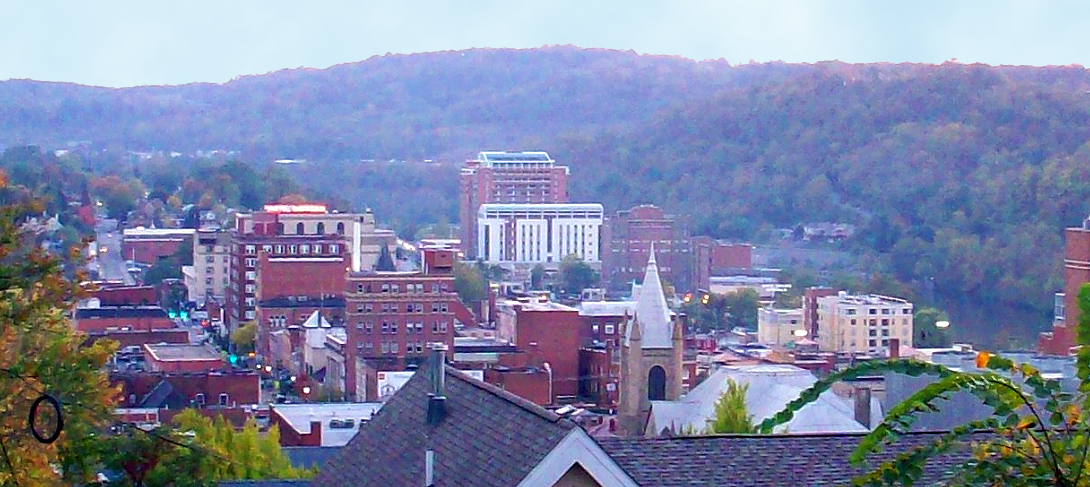
Downtown Morgantown.

- Places with 5,000 to 10,000 inhabitants
  - Cheat Lake (census-designated place)
  - Brookhaven (census-designated place)
- Places with 1,000 to 5,000 inhabitants
  - Cassville (census-designated place)
  - Granville
  - Kingwood
  - Terra Alta
  - Star City
  - Westover
- Places with 500 to 1,000 inhabitants
  - Masontown
  - Reedsville
  - Rowlesburg
- Places with fewer than 500 inhabitants
  - Albright
  - Blacksville
  - Brandonville
  - Bruceton Mills
  - Newburg
  - Tunnelton

=== Unincorporated places ===
- Afton
- Alpine Lake
- Amboy
- Arnettsville
- Arthurdale
- Aurora
- Austen
- Baker Ridge
- Behler
- Bertha Hill
- Booth
- Borgman
- Bowlby
- Bretz
- Brewer Hill
- Browns Chapel
- Bula
- Canyon
- Cascade
- Cheat Neck
- Chestnut Ridge
- Clifton Mills
- Clinton Furnace
- Core
- Corinth
- Crossroads
- Crown
- Cuzzart
- Daybrook
- Dellslow
- Delmar
- Denver
- Easton
- Edna
- Eglon
- Evansville
- Everettville

- Fellowsville
- Fieldcrest
- Flaggy Meadow
- Fort Grand
- Fort Martin
- Georgetown
- Gladefarms
- Greer
- Greystone
- Gum Spring
- Hagans
- Halleck
- Harmony Grove
- Hazelton
- Hilderbrand
- Hoard
- Hog Eye
- Holman
- Hopemont
- Hopewell
- Horse Shoe Run
- Howesville
- Hunting Hills
- Independence
- Jaco
- Jakes Run
- Jere
- Kimberly
- Klondike
- Laurel Point
- Little Falls
- Little Sandy
- Lowsville
- Macdale
- Maidsville

- Manheim
- Manown
- Maple
- Marquess
- McCurdyville
- McMellin
- Miracle Run
- Mooresville
- Morgan Heights
- Mount Olivet
- Mount Vernon
- National
- New Hill
- Opekiska
- Orr
- Osage
- Osgood
- Pedlar
- Pentress
- Pierpont
- Pioneer Rocks
- Pisgah
- Pleasantdale
- Preston
- Price Hill
- Price
- Pursglove
- Ragtown
- Randall
- Richard
- Ridgedale
- Ringgold
- Rock Forge
- Rockville
- Rodemer

- Rohr
- Rosedale
- Ruthbelle
- Sabraton
- Saint Cloud
- Saint Joe
- Saint Leo
- Sandy
- Scotch Hill
- Sell
- Silver Lake
- Sinclair
- Smithtown
- Snider
- Stevensburg
- Stewartstown
- Sturgisson
- Sugar Valley
- Suncrest Lake
- Sunset Beach
- The Mileground
- Threefork Bridge
- Triune
- Turner Douglass
- Tyrone
- Uffington
- Valley Point
- Van Voorhis
- Victoria
- Wadestown
- Wana
- West End
- West Sabraton
- West Van Voorhis
- White Oak Springs
- Worley
- Zevely

== Demographics ==
Historical population
Census	Pop.	Note	%±
1970	89,169		—
1980	105,484		18.3%
1990	104,546		−0.9%
2000	111,200		6.4%
2010	129,709		16.6%
2020	140,038		8.0%
U.S. Decennial Census

As of the census of 2000, there were 111,200 people, 44,990 households, and 26,852 families residing within the MSA. The racial makeup of the MSA was 93.97% White, 2.56% African American, 0.17% Native American, 1.85% Asian, 0.04% Pacific Islander, 0.25% from other races, and 1.16% from two or more races. Hispanic or Latino of any race were 0.89% of the population.

The median income for a household in the MSA was $28,276, and the median income for a family was $38,266. Males had a median income of $29,777 versus $20,867 for females. The per capita income for the MSA was $15,351.

== Combined Statistical Area ==
From 2013 to 2023, the Morgantown MSA was combined with the Fairmont μSA to form the Morgantown–Fairmont Combined Statistical Area (CSA), which had a population of 186,127 at the 2010 census. In addition to the two counties of the Morgantown MSA, the CSA comprised the city of Fairmont (2020 population 18,313) and the rest of Marion County, which lies to the west of the counties of the Morgantown MSA. In 2023, the combined area was abolished as Fairmont and Marion County μSA were annexed to the Clarksburg, WV μSA to form the Clarksburg–Fairmont combined statistical area.

== See also ==
- West Virginia census statistical areas
