= Mountain Line Transit Authority =

Public transport operator in West Virginia, USA

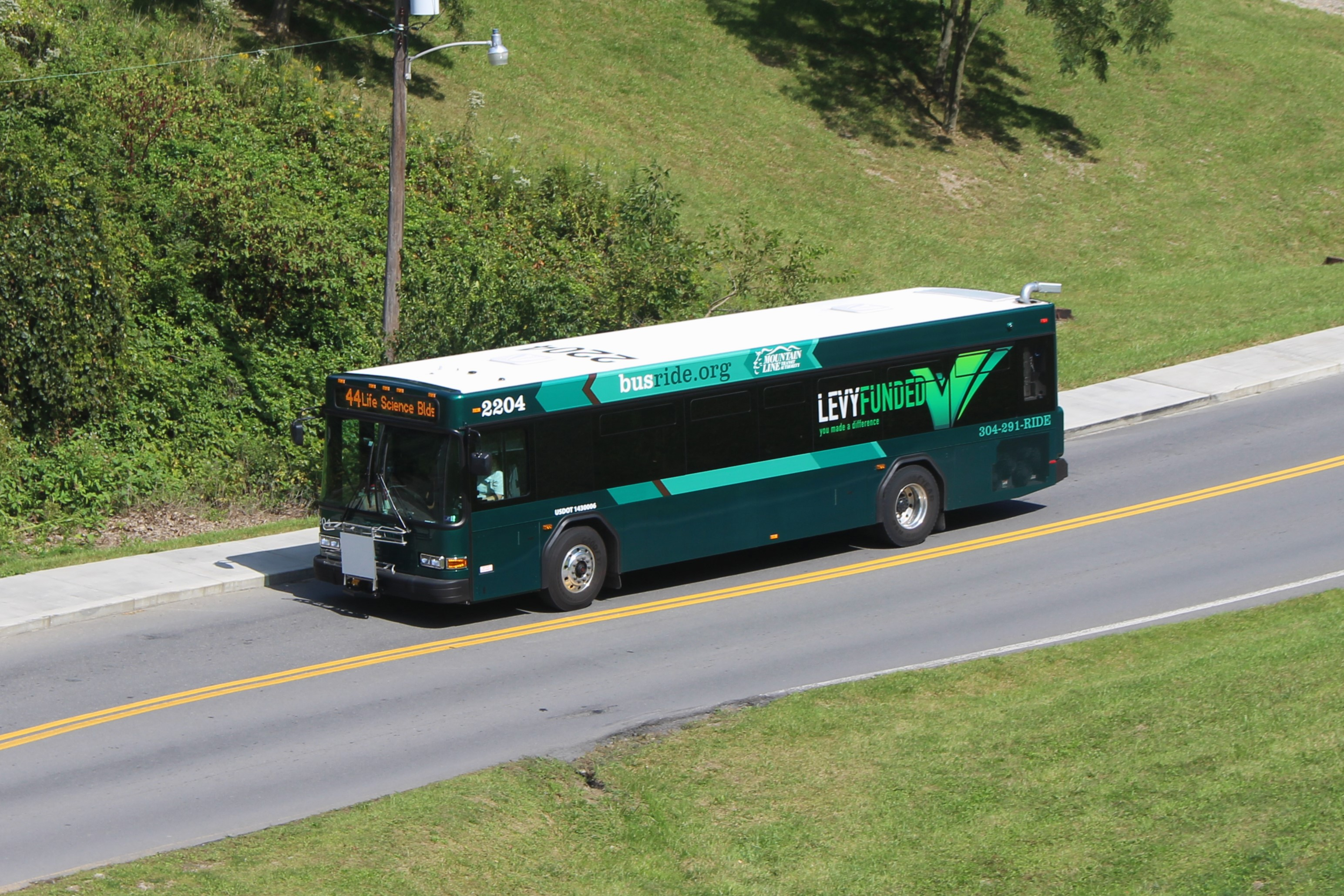
- Founded: November 1995
- Headquarters: 420 Dupont Road; Westover, West Virginia
- Service area: Monongalia County, West Virginia
- Service type: Bus
- Alliance: Greyhound Lines (Grey Line)
- Routes: 21
- Stops: Hail and Ride
- Stations: Westover Terminal
- Fleet: Gillig, Ford E-Series
- Annual ridership: 650,500 (2025)
- Fuel type: Diesel, Gasoline
- Website: busride.org

Mountain Line Transit Authority is the public transportation operator serving Monongalia County, West Virginia, including Morgantown and the campus of West Virginia University. Mountain Line, officially the Monongalia County Urban Mass Transit Authority, operates 20 local bus routes in Monongalia County, and one intercity route to Pittsburgh. In 2025, the system had a ridership of 650,500.

== Services ==
Mountain Line provides bus services throughout Monongalia County, West Virginia. The most frequent services are provided in Morgantown, including the campus of West Virginia University.

Mountain Line's operations facility and main transfer point is the Westover Terminal, located at 691 Fairmont Road in Westover. A second major hub is Mountaineer Station, which is co-located with the Morgantown Personal Rapid Transit Health Sciences Center station.

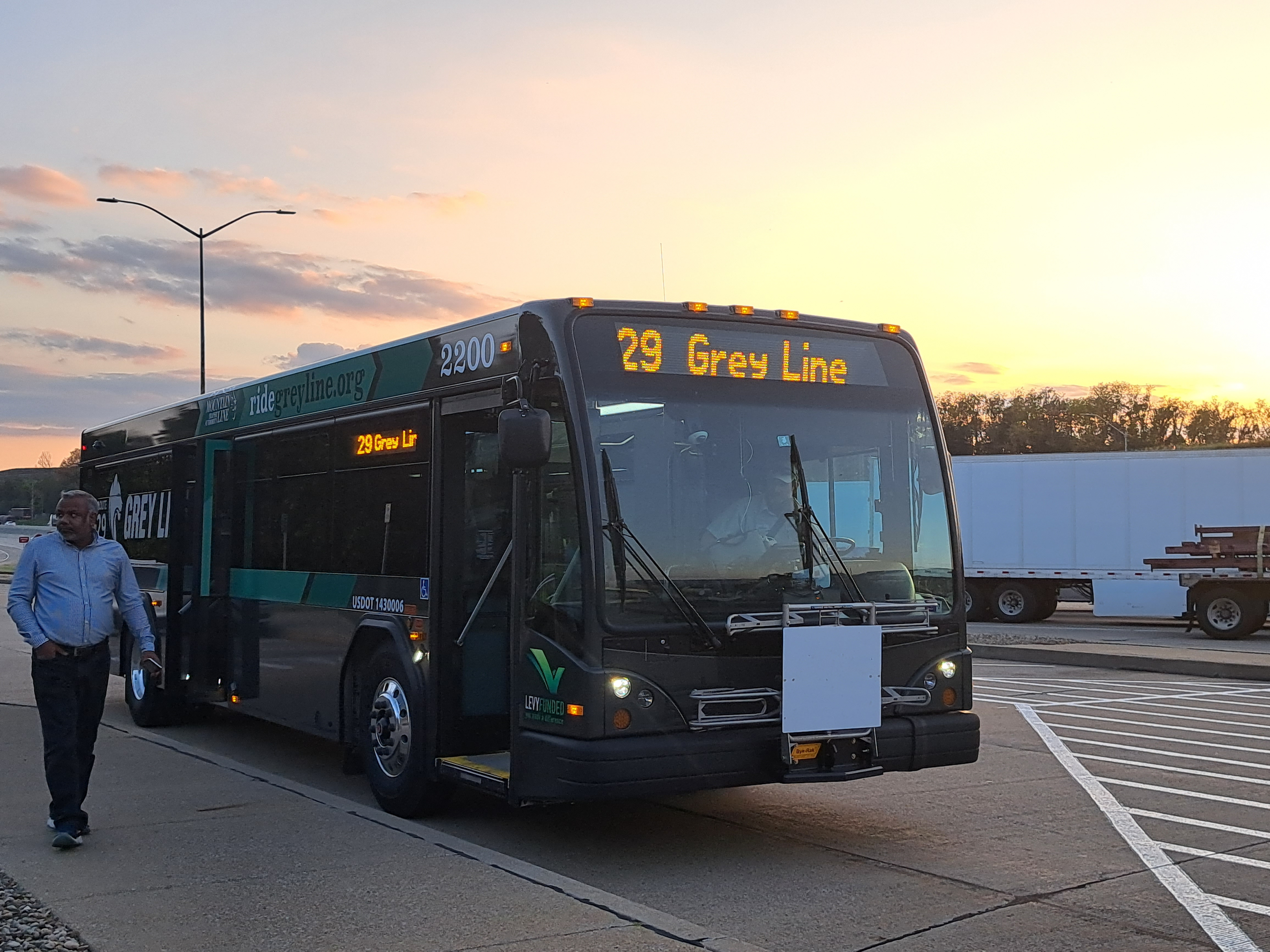
Mountain Line operates the Grey Line service between Clarksburg, Morgantown, and Pittsburgh, succeeding a Greyhound service that was discontinued in 2005

The Grey Line intercity service (route 29) operates from Bridgeport in neighboring Harrison County to Grant Street Transportation Center in Pittsburgh, Pennsylvania, with intermediate stops in Fairmont; Morgantown; Waynesburg, PA; Washington, PA; and Pittsburgh International Airport.

On most Mountain Line services, buses are able to deviate to destinations off the published route. Customers wishing to have buses deviated must first have their pickup point approved by Mountain Line operations staff, to confirm that a full-size bus can safely navigate to the pickup point. Route deviations are not available on lines serving posted stops only.

== Fares ==
The standard fare for Mountain Line local bus services is $0.75. Mobile ticketing is available through the Token Transit app. WVU students and staff, Monongalia County property owners, military veterans, and high school students are eligible for free rides on local services. Deviations are charged an extra $0.50.

In addition to single fares, 15-ride tickets and monthly passes are also available for local services. The monthly Monster Pass provides unlimited travel on Grey Line services and local services.

== History ==
Photograph from April 2015 of one of Mountain Line's Grey Line vehicles parked at the old Downtown Depot.

Mountain Line was founded in 1995, when the City of Morgantown and Monongalia County merged their transit services. Initially, the Mountain Line system served approximately 200,000 passengers per year. Late-night service to the WVU campus began in 2002, growing ridership for the system. Greyhound discontinued its intercity bus service through Morgantown in 2005, and Mountain Line responded by launching the Grey Line intercity service, which continues to operate as of 2024. Mountaineer Station, a bus station co-located with the WVU Personal Rapid Transit system's Health Sciences Center station, opened in 2007.

Monongalia County discontinued much of its funding for transit service in 2016, following a decrease in coal severance tax receipts. Mountain Line proposed a new property tax levy, which was passed by Monongalia County voters. In recognition of the property tax levy's importance, Mountain Line published schedules that showed the specific services funded by the levy, and added "Levy Funded" graphics to newly purchased buses.

The agency faced further challenges in 2018, when local non-emergency medical transportation provider In Touch and Concerned Inc. went out of business. In Touch and Concerned was formerly a partner of Mountain Line, but stopped using space in the agency's facility in Westover after it expanded services. Mountain Line took over some of the company's services with the assistance of local grant funding.

During the early days of the COVID-19 pandemic in West Virginia, Mountain Line expanded its communication through social media, and implemented social distancing restrictions on its buses. WVU closed the PRT system for over a year beginning in March 2020, instituting its own substitute bus service. Mountain Line service continued, paralleling the PRT and providing additional options to WVU students. Also in 2020, a second property tax levy was passed by Monongalia County voters, providing dedicated funding for Mountain Line services.

== Routes ==
Mountain Line operates 21 fixed routes. Unless noted, all routes operate on a hail and ride basis, stopping for any passenger who flags down the bus.

Route	Name	Terminals		Via	Days of service	Hours of service	Notes
1	Campus PM	Morgantown Monongalia County Courthouse	WVU Towers PRT station		Thursday-Saturday	Evenings and late nights	Operates during WVU semesters only, through service with route 1
2	Downtown PM Mall	Morgantown Monongalia County Courthouse	Morgantown Morgantown Mall		Monday-Saturday	Evenings	
4	Orange Line	Westover Westover Terminal	Morgantown Mountaineer Mall		Monday-Saturday	Days	
6	Gold Line	Westover Westover Terminal	WVU Mountaineer Station	Star City	Daily	Days	
7	Red Line	Westover Westover Terminal	WVU Mountaineer Station	Downtown Morgantown	Monday-Saturday	Days	
8	Brookhaven	Westover Westover Terminal	Brookhaven Brookhaven Fire Station		Monday-Saturday	Days	
9	Purple Line	Westover Westover Terminal	WVU Towers PRT station	Suncrest Town Centre	Daily	Days	
11	Cassville	Westover Westover Terminal	Cassville New Hill Community Youth Park	University Town Center	Daily	Days	
12	Blue Line	Westover Westover Terminal	Morgantown Morgantown Municipal Airport	Downtown Morgantown	Monday-Saturday	Days	
13	Crown	Westover Westover Terminal	Crown	One-way loop via Arnettsville and Everettville	Monday-Saturday	Days	Extended service from 3 trips per day to 8 trips per day with discontinuation of Routes 14 and 15.
~~14~~	~~Mountain Heights~~	Westover Westover Terminal	One-way loop via Summers School Rd and Kingwood Pike, serving Mountaineer Mall on inbound trips		Discontinued	Previously 3 trips per day	Replaced with RideMon service
~~15~~	~~Grafton~~	Westover Westover Terminal	Browns Chapel	One-way loop via Grafton Rd, Halleck Rd, and Smithtown Rd	Discontinued	Previously 2 trips per day	Replaced with RideMon service
16	Pink Line	Westover Westover Terminal	Morgantown Fort Pierpont Dr & Old Cheat Rd	Downtown Morgantown	Monday-Saturday	Days	
29	Grey Line	Bridgeport, WV	Pittsburgh, PA Grant Street Transportation Center	Fairmont; Morgantown; Waynesburg, PA; Washington, PA; Pittsburgh International Airport	Daily (including holidays)	Days	Stops at posted stops only. Reservations accepted via the Greyhound national sales network
30	West Run	Morgantown West Run Apartments	WVU Mountainlair Student Union		Monday-Saturday	Days/Late Night	Stops at posted stops only. Late Night service is extended to the Mountainlair and the Monongalia County Courthouse. Route operates during WVU semesters only
38	Blue & Gold	WVU Evansdale Crossing /Towers PRT station	WVU Life Sciences Building	One-way loop via Grant Ave and Beechurst Ave	Daily	Days	Stops at posted stops only. Reduced service during WVU breaks
39	Beechurst Express	WVU Evansdale Crossing /Towers PRT station	WVU Life Sciences Building	One-way loop via Beechurst Ave and Grant Ave	Monday-Friday	Days	Stops at posted stops only. Operates during WVU semesters only
44	Valley View	Morgantown Valley View Woods Apartments	WVU University Ave & Falling Run Rd		Monday-Friday	Mornings	
46	Eastern Circulator	Sabraton Goodwill Store	Morgantown University High School		Monday-Saturday	Days	
46	Eastern Circulator	Sabraton Goodwill Store	Cheat Lake Mon-Fayette Industrial Park		Monday-Saturday	Days	
47	Northern Circulator	WVU Mountaineer Station	Star City Riverside Commons Apartments		Monday-Saturday	Days	
47	Northern Circulator	WVU Mountaineer Station	Independence Hills Mobile Home Park	Mon General Hospital	Monday-Saturday	Days	
50	Don Knotts	Westover Westover Terminal	Morgantown Hornbeck Rd Walmart	House of Hope	Daily	Days	
51	Westridge Mylan	Westover Westover Terminal	Mylan Park	Morgantown Mall	Daily	Days	
52	Wadestown	Westover Westover Terminal	Wadestown	Cassville, Blacksville	Monday-Friday	4 trips per day	
