= Monongalia County Militia =

American Revolutionary War military unit

Monongalia County Militia of Virginia
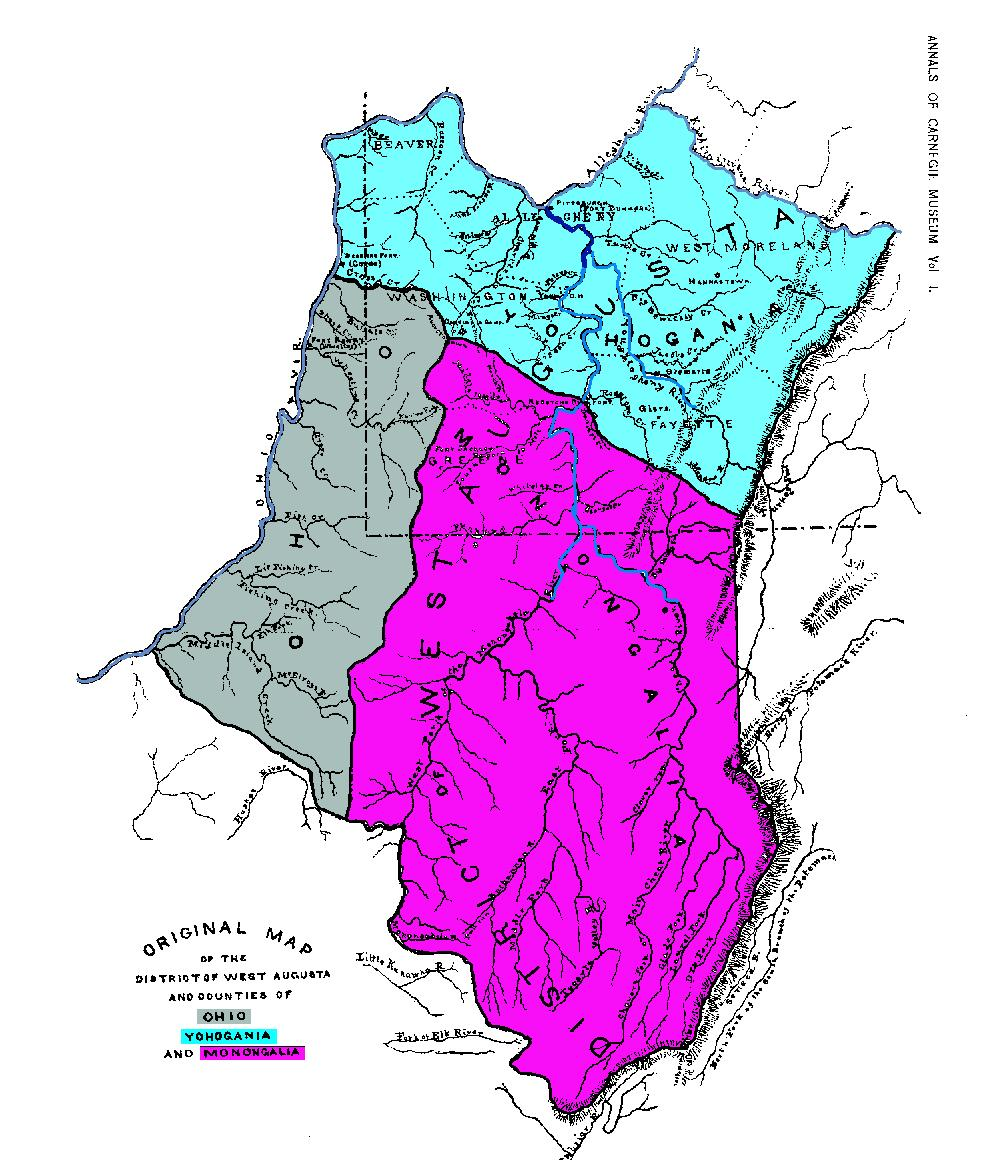
- A Map of Monongalia County, Virginia in 1776 (purple area). Note the areas of modern-day counties that fall under the jurisdiction of Monongalia County at the time.
- Active: 1774-1782
- Country: United Colonies 1774-1776; United States 1776-1782
- Allegiance: Virginia
- Type: Militia of Frontier Riflemen
- Size: approx. 1,000 men max. throughout war
- Part of: Virginia Militia, Western Department of the Continental Army
- Equipment: Kentucky Longrifle
- Engagements: Battles 1777-1782: •Battles of Saratoga; •Battle of Bemis Heights; •Western Theater of the American Revolution; •McIntosh Expedition; •Clark's Illinois Campaign (detachment); •Brodhead’s Coshocton Expedition (detachment); •Crawford Expedition

Commanders
- Notable commanders: Thomas Gaddis William Haymond Zackquill Morgan

The Monongalia County Militia was a component of the Virginia militia during Lord Dunmore’s War and the American Revolutionary War. It was based in Monongalia County, Virginia. It mostly fought invading Indian tribes who crossed the Ohio River as well as local Tories loyal to the British Crown, but it is said to have participated in the Saratoga Campaign, George Rogers Clark's Campaign in 1779, as well as other expeditions against hostile Indians.

== Size and Composition ==
According to Thomas Jefferson's Notes on the State of Virginia, the company consisted of about 1,000 men. Many of these men that served with this unit served with other units throughout the war, depending on their enlistment terms or if their services were needed in the defense of the frontier. While these men all fought for freedom from their British oppressors, they also fought in the defense of their families and settlements: in this theater of the Revolution, every able-bodied man was a soldier. Rather than the unit being one large company of militia, companies were assigned to areas surrounding forts throughout the county. According to Glenn Lough's Now and Long Ago: A History of the Marion County Area, many forts were garrisoned by the unit: notably forts like Prickett's Fort, Fort Martin, and Statler's Fort. The band of men from the backwoods of western Virginia and Pennsylvania all hailed from Monongalia County, Virginia at the time: made up of modern-day counties of Monongalia, Marion, Barbour, Harrison, Tucker, Randolph, and several others in north central West Virginia; and Washington, Greene, and Fayette counties of Pennsylvania.

== Combat Chronicle ==
=== Early Frontier Combat and Lord Dunmore's War ===
The unit of Monongalia County Militia took part in the defense of the territories of western Virginia and southwestern Pennsylvania from before the Revolution in 1774, to the resurgence of hostilities in 1775, to the final Indian Battle on the eastern side of the Ohio River at Fort Henry in 1782. Many, if not all, men that served with Monongalia County Militia had prior service against Native Americans while serving with the Virginia Regiment of the British Army in the French and Indian War: serving at battles like Fort Necessity, Expeditions against Fort Duquesne, and the Battle of the Monongahela. Pre-Revolution, the company wasn't formed in an official capacity until 1775, first serving under the militia of the West Augusta District until 1776 when Monongalia County was created. Before major combat on the frontier, these men constructed forts across western Virginia to defend against possible attacks from Chief Logan’s party of Natives following the Yellow Creek Massacre. However, the Battle of Point Pleasant of the short-lived Lord Dunmore’s War quickly drove off the party, and peace was restored across the land for around a year. At the same time, many of the men of Monongalia County are credited with fighting during Lord Dunmore's War at Wakatomika during McDonald's Campaign in summer of 1774.

=== American Revolution on the Frontier ===
When Revolution began, the unit drove invading Indian parties away from their local forts and homesteads, countered attacks on nearby Fort Pitt in present-day Pittsburgh, Pennsylvania, and defended the Backcountry area of western Virginia from Tory threats. They also foiled a British plan to create a regiment of Natives and Tories in what became known as "Connoly's Plot," protecting Monongalia from British attempts to seize the frontier while preserving peace with Indians in the early years of war in 1775 and 1776. However, this peace with the Indians did not last very long after Revolution began: incursions happened throughout the Monongalia County area from 1776 to the end of war in 1783, and to some degree until 1794 (The Battle of Fallen Timbers at that time eliminated all Indian threats east of the Mississippi River). Many men, women, and children were killed and scalped; and countless homesteads and forts were destroyed. On the other hand, the only major battle east of the Appalachians that the unit participated in was when Officer Zackwill Morgan led approximately 600 men from Monongalia county to fight under command of General Horatio Gates at the Battles of Saratoga in the fall of 1777, but a large number of the unit remained in western Virginia to fight against diversionary war parties sent from Fort Detroit. Following this action, threats of a Tory uprising in late 1777 and early in the year 1778 brought the unit home. Though the early-war "Connoly's Plot" failed, it brought inspiration to future attempts at creating British frontier regiments. The most notable of these later attempts was when two American leaders, Simon Girty and Alexander McKee, defected to the British Army, where they hired several native tribes to the British to attack frontier settlements in the Ohio and Monongahela valleys. Meanwhile, a small contingent of men from Monongalia County marched with George Rogers Clark in his Illinois Campaign of 1778–1779. In spite of odds being stacked against the militia of frontier patriots, the Tory threat was diminished following several small skirmishes (as well as legal action), and the Americans had a firm grasp on the western British and Indian territories along the Ohio River. Following Clark's initial occupation of the Illinois Country, other detachments fought with General McIntosh in his invasion of Indian towns in the lands West beyond the Ohio River, notably at the Siege of Fort Laurens when frontier units attempted to control Northwestern Indian Territories during McIntosh's Campaign in 1778 into early 1779. After the inconclusive McIntosh Campaign, Monongalia County was called upon again in the recapture of Vincennes and Fort Sackville in Illinois: thus effectively removing British "scalp buyers" from their western outposts. For most of 1780, for Monongalia Militiamen, the Revolution was spent doing typical frontiersmen duties at their settlements while fighting off what few Indian troops came into the area. Eventually, Monongalia County Militia participated in some strength in 1781 during Brodhead's Coshocton Expedition, and considerably in 1782 in Crawford's Expedition: another failed attempt to take British Fort Detroit. Over time, several of the local civilian forts of Monongalia County were attacked: some stood the test of time and kept fighting for freedom (such as Fort Martin), while many others were ransacked and destroyed by adversaries (such as Fort Coburn). Fighting on the frontier during the American Revolution arguably ended in 1782 after the last elements of Americans invaded Indian territories West of the Ohio River, and the Second Siege of Fort Henry was lifted. From 1775 to 1782, Monongalia County saw much death among its civilians rather than its combatants. Many white civilian men, women, and children were killed and scalped by Native enemies who invaded American forts and homesteads. While the unit as a whole does not have campaign credit for battles outside the western theater besides Saratoga, several of its members are credited for such action while serving with the 13th and 7th Virginia Line Regiments, 8th Pennsylvania Line Regiment, Morgan’s Rifleman Corps, or the Virginia and Maryland Rifle Regiment(which all recruited from western Virginia): Siege of Boston, Battle of Trenton.

== Timeline of Events ==
1774	Hostilities following the Yellow Creek Massacre force settlers to establish the Monongalia County Militia (Mon. County Militia), as the frontier fighters construct civilian forts across the county to defend against possible Native aggressors. Such aggressors were defeated and were forced to sue for peace following defeat at the Battle of Point Pleasant.
1775	Occasional hostility between militia and Natives, relative peace is achieved via the Treaty of Camp Charlotte of 1774 ratified following Lord Dunmore's War.
1776	Peace is maintained on the frontier, Mon. County Militia is ordered to raise 234 men including 12 officers: the first of several such drafts throughout the war.
1777	"The Year of the Bloody Three Sevens." Native hostilities renew as raids continue in newfound strength. A large number of men from the unit participate at the Battles of Saratoga in New York. A Tory revolt is quelled following the acquittal of Zackquill Morgan (He had supposedly drowned a Tory sympathizer in the Cheat River), and minor skirmish pushed said Tories and hired Natives across the Ohio into British Territory. Mon. county is ordered to raise an additional 40 men.
1778	Militiamen participate in McIntosh's Campaign in the Ohio Country as well as Clark's Campaign into the Illinois Country. Fort Coburn is destroyed by Natives. Number of men recruited for the year rises to 173
1779	The draw at the Siege of Fort Laurens between frontier militia and Natives marks the end of McIntosh's Campaign. Elements of Mon. County militia recapture important British outposts in the Illinois Country, as Clark's Campaign ends in an American victory. Natives renew hostilities in Mon. County as Fort Martin defeats invaders.
1780	American frontier militia remain at home, defending attacks from Natives, as fighting intensified.
1781	Native attacks on settlements in Mon. County reach their peak: more and more civilians are killed and scalped, while local forts continue to "hold out."
1782	Mon. County Militiamen participate in the failed Crawford Campaign in an attempt to defeat Native attackers once and for all. Natives make last attack at Fort Henry, marking an end of hostilities of the American Revolution in Mon. County as well as western Virginia.
1783-1794	Treaty of Paris marks an official end between British and American forces. Native threats against Mon. County frontiersmen did not end until the defeat of Natives at the Battle of Fallen Timbers in 1794.

== Fort Commands ==
This is a list of civilian and military forts and blockhouses located in then-Monongalia County and/or were under command of Monongalia County Militia:

Modern-day reconstruction of Fort Prickett, an example of the countless other forts throughout Monongalia County.

- Fort Adkinson-Built [unknown] on Ten Mile Creek of Washington County, Pennsylvania.
- Baldwin Blockhouse-Built 1774 near Blacksville, West Virginia
- Fort Burris-Built 1766 in Star City area of Morgantown, West Virginia. Looted and destroyed in 1778.
- Fort Butler-Built 1774 on Roaring Creek in Preston County, West Virginia.
- Fort Cobun/Coburn-Built 1770 near Dorsey's Knob of Morgantown, West Virginia: destroyed in 1779.
- Fort Coon-Built 1774 on Coon's Run of the West Fork River, survived an ambush in 1777.
- Fort Currence/Fort Cassino-Built 1774 near village of Crickard in Randolph County, West Virginia.
- Fort Dinwiddie-Built 1769 at Stewartstown, West Virginia.
- Fort Edwards-Built 1772 near Boothsville, West Virginia.
- Fort Evans- Built [unknown] near present-day Point Marion, Pennsylvania.
- Fort Harrison-Built 1773 near Crooked Run in Monongalia County, West Virginia.
- Hoult Blockhouse-Built 1772 north of Fairmont, West Virginia.
- Fort Jackson-Built 1774 on the Ten Mile Creek in Harrison County, West Virginia.
- Fort Kerns-Built 1772 on Deckers Creek near Morgantown, West Virginia.
- Fort Lindley- Built [unknown] near Prosperity, Pennsylvania.
- Fort Martin-Built 1773 on Crooked Run of the Case district in present-day Fort Martin community of Monongalia County, West Virginia: attacked in 1779 but prevailed.
- Fort Morgan-Built 1772 in the vicinity of the city of Morgantown, West Virginia.
- Fort Morris-Built 1774 along Bog Run in Preston County, West Virginia
- Fort Nutter-Built 1772 on the Elk Creek of Harrison County, West Virginia.
- Fort Paw Paw-Built 1781 in Rivesville, West Virginia
- Fort Pierpont-Built 1769 in Union District of Monongalia County, West Virginia, four miles from Morgantown.
- Fort Powers-Built 1771 on Simpson's Creek of Bridgeport, West Virginia.
- Fort Prickett-Built 1774 near Fairmont, West Virginia.
- Fort Scott's Mill-Built [unknown] near Star City area of Morgantown, West Virginia.
- Fort Statler-Built 1770 on Dunkard Creek in Clay District of Monongalia County, West Virginia: destroyed in 1778.
- Stewart Blockhouse-Built 1773 on Stewart's Run near village of Georgetown, West Virginia.
- Fort Warwick-Built [unknown] in Huttonsville District of Randolph County, West Virginia
- Fort Westfall-Built 1774 near Beverly of Randolph County, West Virginia.
- Fort Wilson- Built 1772 near mouth of Chenoweth Creek of modern-day Randolph County, West Virginia.

-In addition to stationing men at these frontier forts, elements of the unit often also garrisoned Fort Pitt: the headquarters of the Western Department of the Continental Army and militia forces.
