= Jakes Run =

Jakes Run may refer to:

- Jakes Run (Little Muncy Creek), a stream in Pennsylvania
- Jakes Run (Dunkard Creek), a stream in West Virginia
- Jakes Run, West Virginia, an unincorporated community
