= Ragtown =

Ragtown may refer to one of the following places

- Ragtown, Nevada
- Ragtown, California
- Ragtown, Arkansas, Monroe County
- Ragtown, Texas, Lamar County
- Ragtown, West Virginia, Monongalia County
