= Morgan Heights =

Morgan Heights may refer to:

- Morgan Heights, Colorado
- Morgan Heights, New Jersey
- Morgan Heights, West Virginia
