= Brewer Hill =

Brewer Hill, Brewers' Hill, and Brewer's Hill may refer to:

- Brewer's Hill, Baltimore, a neighborhood in Baltimore, Maryland
- Brewer Hill, West Virginia, an unincorporated community in Monongalia County
- Brewers' Hill, one of the Neighborhoods of Milwaukee
