= Pierpont, West Virginia =

Pierpont, West Virginia may refer to:

- Pierpont, Monongalia County, West Virginia
- Pierpont, Wyoming County, West Virginia
