= Kimberly, West Virginia =

Kimberly is the name of several unincorporated communities in the U.S. state of West Virginia.

- Kimberly, Fayette County, West Virginia
- Kimberly, Monongalia County, West Virginia
