= Arnettsville, West Virginia =

Unincorporated community in West Virginia, United States

Arnettsville
- Unincorporated community
- Location within the state of West Virginia Arnettsville (the United States)
- Coordinates: 39°35′8″N 80°5′32″W
- Country: United States
- State: West Virginia
- County: Monongalia
- Time zone: UTC-5 (Eastern (EST))
  - Summer (DST): UTC-4 (EDT)

Arnettsville is an unincorporated community in Monongalia County, West Virginia, United States. It lies south of Georgetown on U.S. Route 19. Arnettsville was originally known as Yukon. It is included in the Morgantown metropolitan area.

Arnettsville was named for a pioneer merchant named Arnett.

== Notable person ==
- Mary Miller Glasscock, First Lady of West Virginia (1909–13), was born in Arnettsville.
