= Rosedale, Monongalia County, West Virginia =

Rosdale
- Unincorporated community
- Location within the state of West Virginia Rosdale (the United States)
- Coordinates: 39°41′12″N 79°57′54″W
- Country: United States
- State: West Virginia
- County: Monongalia
- Elevation: 994 ft (303 m)
- Time zone: UTC-5 (Eastern (EST))
  - Summer (DST): UTC-4 (EDT)
- GNIS ID: 1555524

Rosedale is an unincorporated community in Monongalia County, West Virginia, United States.
