= Hunting Hills =

- Unincorporated community
- Location within the state of West Virginia Hunting Hills (the United States)
- Coordinates: 39°41′13.29″N 80°19′33.27″W
- Country: United States
- State: West Virginia
- County: Monongalia
- Elevation: 1,011 ft (308 m)
- Time zone: UTC-5 (Eastern (EST))
  - Summer (DST): UTC-4 (EDT)
- GNIS ID: 1728243

Hunting Hills is an unincorporated community in Monongalia County, West Virginia, United States.

== History ==
Hunting Hills was started as a "new town for coal miners" by the Eastern Associated Coal Corporation in 1968 to service 3 mines in Monongalia County made by them and Consolidation Coal.
