= Cascade, West Virginia =

Unincorporated community in West Virginia, United States

- Unincorporated community
- Location within West Virginia Location within the United States
- Coordinates: 39°33′48″N 79°48′52″W
- Country: United States
- State: West Virginia
- County: Preston
- Elevation: 1,703 ft (519 m)
- Time zone: UTC-5 (Eastern (EST))
  - Summer (DST): UTC-4 (EDT)
- Area codes: 304 & 681
- GNIS feature ID: 1554081

Cascade is an unincorporated community in Preston County, West Virginia, United States. Cascade is located along West Virginia Route 7, Deckers Creek, and a CSX Railroad line 1.2 miles (1.9 km) northwest of Masontown.
