= Delmar, West Virginia =

Unincorporated community in West Virginia, United States

Delmar
- Unincorporated community
- Location within the state of West Virginia Delmar (the United States)
- Coordinates: 39°36′16″N 80°0′26″W
- Country: United States
- State: West Virginia
- County: Monongalia
- Elevation: 1,099 ft (335 m)
- Time zone: UTC-5 (Eastern (EST))
  - Summer (DST): UTC-4 (EDT)
- GNIS ID: 1554285

Delmar is an unincorporated community in Monongalia County, West Virginia, United States. It was also known as Hilderbrand.
