= Richard, West Virginia =

Richard
- Unincorporated community
- Location within the state of West Virginia Richard (the United States)
- Coordinates: 39°36′24″N 79°54′23″W
- Country: United States
- State: West Virginia
- County: Monongalia
- Elevation: 922 ft (281 m)
- Time zone: UTC-5 (Eastern (EST))
  - Summer (DST): UTC-4 (EDT)
- GNIS ID: 1555473

Richard is an unincorporated community in Monongalia County, West Virginia, United States.

== Mining Operations ==
In 1903 the West Virginia Coal Company established what would become the Richard Mine to fuel 75 beehive coke ovens previously constructed at the site. Stephen B. Elkins acquired the mine three year later. Coal and coke from the Richard Mine was initially transported via the Morgantown and Kingwood Railroad, which was owned by Stephen B. Elkins at the time, before being transferred to the Baltimore and Ohio Railroad for delivery to the steel mills at Sparrow's Point near Baltimore.

Sparrow's Point was purchased by the Bethlehem Steel Corporation in 1914. The Penn-Mary Company, a subsidiary of the Bethlehem Steel, acquired the Richard Mine in 1919. The mine operated under ownership of Bethlehem Steel until it closed. At its peak, in 1942, the mine employed 500+ people and produced over 600,000 tons of coal. Technological advancements eventually rendered beehive ovens obsolete and the Richard mine finally closed in 1952.

The area around the mine's former site has become mostly residential with a few businesses. The former company store, the former company office building, and many houses built by the company have survived and are still in use.

== Remediation effort ==
The defunct Richard Mine is the single largest source of acid mine drainage into Deckers Creek watershed. Each year the mine discharges 730,500 pounds of acidity, 140,000 pounds of iron, 59,000 pounds of aluminum and 3,200 pounds of manganese.

The Richard Mine acid mine drainage treatment plant began operation April 15, 2024. The Richard Mine Complex will become the central hub to remotely control other treatment sites. WVU Water Research Institute is conducting an experiment at the facility to extract rare earth elements for the acid mine drainage.
