= Morgantown and Kingwood Railroad =

Overview
- Headquarters: Morgantown, West Virginia
- Reporting mark: M&K
- Locale: Monongalia and Preston Counties, West Virginia, United States
- Dates of operation: 1899–1920
- Successor: Baltimore and Ohio Railroad

Technical
- Track gauge: 4 ft 8 1/2 in (1,435 mm) standard gauge
- Length: 47.9 mi (77.1 km)

The Morgantown and Kingwood Railroad (reporting mark M&K) was a railroad in West Virginia in the United States. It extended from the Baltimore and Ohio Railroad (B&O) junction in Morgantown in Monongalia County via Masontown, Kingwood and Rowlesburg to the M&K junction with the B&O in Preston County, a distance of 47.9 mi (77.1 km). The M&K also operated approximately 5 mi (8.0 km) of branch lines along the route.

The M&K was completed in three stages: Morgantown to Bretz was completed in September 1903, Bretz to Kingwood in March 1906, and Kingwood to Rowlesburg in July 1907. The route followed the course of Deckers Creek to Kingwood. The M&K had shops and a yard at Sabraton.

The line primarily carried coal, building stone, glass sand and lumber. By 1906 the line provided a twice-daily passenger service to Kingwood. It was a key stimulus in the economic development of the region at the turn of the 20th century.

== History ==
George Cookman Sturgiss created the Morgantown and Kingwood Railroad Company which took out a charter for the M&K Railroad on 10 January 1899. Sturgiss had previously been involved in several failed attempts to build the line and was in possession of much of the proposed right-of-way. 8 mi (13 km) of the route were graded by September 1899. Tracklaying began on 19 September 1899, and 3 mi (4.8 km) was laid by November with 10 mi (16 km) graded. 12 mi (19 km) were complete by December 1901.

Stephen Elkins purchased the M&K Railroad Company in 1902. The 18 mi (29 km) stretch to Masontown along Deckers Creek was completed by September 1902. 2.5 mi (4.0 km) of track was laid between Bretz and Reedsville in 1904, and the railroad reached Reedsville during 1905. The Railroad Gazette page 23 July, 1905 indicates the line from Bretz to Reedsville is complete and the Morgantown and Kingwood is now constructing the 12 and a half miles from Reedsville to Kingwood. The company is also asking for bids from Kingwood to Rowlesburg. The section between Reedsville and Rowlesburg was under construction by 1906. 9 mi (14 km) of track was laid in 1905.

The B&O gained control of the M&K in 1920 and operated it as a subsidiary.
