= Mary Miller Glasscock =

First Lady of West Virginia (1872–1925)

- Born: Mary Miller; September 8, 1872; Arnettsville, West Virginia, U.S.
- Died: April 12, 1925 (aged 52); Morgantown, West Virginia, U.S.
- Known for: First Lady of West Virginia, 1909-1913

Mary Miller Glasscock (1872–1925) was the wife of former Governor of West Virginia William E. Glasscock and served as that state's First Lady, 1909–1913. She was born September 8, 1872, at Arnettsville, West Virginia. In 1888, just shy of her 16th birthday, she married William E. Glasscock. As first lady, she hosted social gatherings and participated in Charleston civic affairs.

After leaving office, the Glasscocks resided at Morgantown, West Virginia where she died from breast cancer on April 12, 1925, aged 52, less than three months after the death of her husband.

Honorary titles
Preceded by Maude Brown Dawson	First Lady of West Virginia; 1909–1913	Succeeded by South Carolina "Carrie" Bronson Hatfield
