= Pedlar, West Virginia =

Pedlar
- Unincorporated community
- Location within the state of West Virginia Pedlar (the United States)
- Coordinates: 39°35′2″N 80°2′15″W
- Country: United States
- State: West Virginia
- County: Monongalia
- Elevation: 965 ft (294 m)
- Time zone: UTC-5 (Eastern (EST))
  - Summer (DST): UTC-4 (EDT)
- GNIS ID: 1544685

Pedlar is an unincorporated community in Monongalia County, West Virginia, United States. Its post office has been closed.

The community takes its name from nearby Pedlar Run.
