= Berry Hollow =

Valley in Monongalia County, West Virginia, in the United States

Coordinates: 39°40′30″N 80°06′05″W

Berry Hollow is a valley in Monongalia County, West Virginia, in the United States.

Berry Hollow has the name of James Berry, a pioneer who settled there.
