= Greer, Monongalia County, West Virginia =

Greer
- Unincorporated community
- Location within the state of West Virginia Greer (the United States)
- Coordinates: 39°34′19″N 79°50′56″W
- Country: United States
- State: West Virginia
- County: Monongalia
- Elevation: 1,463 ft (446 m)
- Time zone: UTC-5 (Eastern (EST))
  - Summer (DST): UTC-4 (EDT)
- GNIS ID: 1554614

Greer is an unincorporated community and coal town in Monongalia County, West Virginia, United States.
