= New Hill, West Virginia =

- Unincorporated community
- Location within West Virginia Location within the United States
- Coordinates: 39°40′06″N 80°04′17″W
- Country: United States
- State: West Virginia
- County: Monongalia
- Elevation: 1,204 ft (367 m)
- Time zone: UTC-5 (Eastern (EST))
  - Summer (DST): UTC-4 (EDT)
- Area codes: 304 & 681
- GNIS feature ID: 1555208

New Hill is an unincorporated community in Monongalia County, West Virginia, United States. New Hill is 6.5 miles (10.5 km) west-northwest of Morgantown.
