= Sturgisson, West Virginia =

Sturgisson
- Unincorporated community
- Location within the state of West Virginia Sturgisson (the United States)
- Coordinates: 39°35′1″N 79°52′5″W
- Country: United States
- State: West Virginia
- County: Monongalia
- Elevation: 1,411 ft (430 m)
- Time zone: UTC-5 (Eastern (EST))
  - Summer (DST): UTC-4 (EDT)
- GNIS ID: 1728495

Sturgisson is an unincorporated community in Monongalia County, West Virginia, United States.
