= Bowlby, West Virginia =

Unincorporated community in West Virginia, United States

Bowlby
- Unincorporated community
- Location within the state of West Virginia Bowlby (the United States)
- Coordinates: 39°42′41″N 80°1′0″W
- Country: United States
- State: West Virginia
- County: Monongalia
- Elevation: 1,007 ft (307 m)
- Time zone: UTC-5 (Eastern (EST))
  - Summer (DST): UTC-4 (EDT)
- GNIS ID: 1536261

Bowlby is an unincorporated community in Monongalia County, West Virginia, United States.
