= Mooresville, West Virginia =

Mooresville
- Unincorporated community
- Location within the state of West Virginia Mooresville (the United States)
- Coordinates: 39°41′24″N 80°8′53″W
- Country: United States
- State: West Virginia
- County: Monongalia
- Elevation: 958 ft (292 m)
- Time zone: UTC-5 (Eastern (EST))
  - Summer (DST): UTC-4 (EDT)
- GNIS ID: 1543522

Mooresville is an unincorporated community in Monongalia County, West Virginia, United States.

Mooresville was platted in the 1840s by Rawley Moore, and named for him.
