= Cassville, West Virginia =

- CDP
- Location within the state of West Virginia
- Coordinates: 39°39′43″N 80°3′3″W
- Country: United States
- State: West Virginia
- County: Monongalia

Area
  - Total: 3.6 sq mi (9.2 km^{2})
  - Land: 3.6 sq mi (9.2 km^{2})
  - Water: 0 sq mi (0.0 km^{2})
- Elevation: 1,001 ft (305 m)

Population (2010)
  - Total: 1,268
  - Density: 360/sq mi (140/km^{2})
- Time zone: UTC-5 (Eastern (EST))
  - Summer (DST): UTC-4 (EDT)
- ZIP code: 26527
- Area code: 304
- FIPS code: 54-13756
- GNIS feature ID: 1554085

Cassville is a census-designated place (CDP) in Monongalia County, West Virginia, United States. The population was 1,268 at the 2020 census. It is included in the Morgantown metropolitan area. Cassville was named after Lewis Cass, a prominent American statesman who served as Secretary of War, Secretary of State, and Governor of Michigan.

== Geography ==
Cassville is located at 39°39′43″N 80°3′3″W (39.661889, -80.050873).

According to the United States Census Bureau, the Cassville CDP has a total area of 9.2 km^{2} (3.6 sq mi), all land.

== Demographics ==
As of the census of 2000, there were 1,586 people, 644 households, and 446 families residing in the CDP. The population density was 40.6 people/km^{2} (105 people/mi^{2}). There were 704 housing units at an average density of 18.0 units/km^{2} (47 units/mi^{2}). The racial makeup of the CDP was 95.59% White, 1.83% African American, 0.57% Native American, 0.13% Asian, 0.19% from other races, and 1.70% from two or more races. Hispanic or Latino of any race were 1.01% of the population.

There were 644 households, out of which 26.1% had children under the age of 18 living with them, 55.4% were married couples living together, 8.9% had a female householder with no husband present, and 30.6% were non-families. 25.5% of all households were made up of individuals, and 12.0% had someone living alone who was 65 years of age or older. The average household size was 2.46 and the average family size was 2.97.

The age distribution is 21.5% under the age of 18, 7.6% from 18 to 24, 30.1% from 25 to 44, 26.6% from 45 to 64, and 14.2% who were 65 years of age or older. The median age was 40 years. For every 100 females, there were 96.8 males. For every 100 females age 18 and over, there were 94.8 males.

The median income for a household in the CDP was $25,799, and the median income for a family was $28,782. Males had a median income of $25,217 versus $24,712 for females. The per capita income for the CDP was $13,045. About 11.5% of families and 18.2% of the population were below the poverty line, including 26.9% of those under age 18 and 11.6% of those age 65 or over.
