= McMellin, West Virginia =

McMellin
- Unincorporated community
- Location within the state of West Virginia McMellin (the United States)
- Coordinates: 39°42′19″N 79°48′41″W
- Country: United States
- State: West Virginia
- County: Monongalia
- Elevation: 1,122 ft (342 m)
- Time zone: UTC-5 (Eastern (EST))
  - Summer (DST): UTC-4 (EDT)
- GNIS ID: 1728349

McMellin was an unincorporated community in Monongalia County, West Virginia, United States.
