= West Van Voorhis, West Virginia =

- Unincorporated community
- Location within West Virginia Location within the United States
- Coordinates: 39°41′07″N 79°57′03″W
- Country: United States
- State: West Virginia
- County: Monongalia
- Elevation: 810 ft (250 m)
- Time zone: UTC-5 (Eastern (EST))
  - Summer (DST): UTC-4 (EDT)
- Area codes: 304 & 681
- GNIS feature ID: 1555956

West Van Voorhis is an unincorporated community in Monongalia County, West Virginia, United States. West Van Voorhis is located on the north bank of the Monongahela River across from Van Voorhis, 4 miles (6.4 km) north of Morgantown.
