= Pioneer Rocks, West Virginia =

Pioneer Rocks
- Unincorporated community
- Location within the state of West Virginia Pioneer Rocks (the United States)
- Coordinates: 39°36′34″N 79°53′10″W
- Country: United States
- State: West Virginia
- County: Monongalia
- Elevation: 1,020 ft (310 m)
- Time zone: UTC-5 (Eastern (EST))
  - Summer (DST): UTC-4 (EDT)
- GNIS ID: 1544947

Pioneer Rocks is an unincorporated community in Monongalia County, West Virginia, United States.
