= Osgood, West Virginia =

Osgood
- Unincorporated community
- Location within the state of West Virginia Osgood (the United States)
- Coordinates: 39°34′0″N 80°4′37″W
- Country: United States
- State: West Virginia
- County: Monongalia
- Elevation: 932 ft (284 m)
- Time zone: UTC-5 (Eastern (EST))
  - Summer (DST): UTC-4 (EDT)
- GNIS ID: 1555281

Osgood is an unincorporated community in Monongalia County, West Virginia, United States.
