= Osage, West Virginia =

Osage
- Unincorporated community
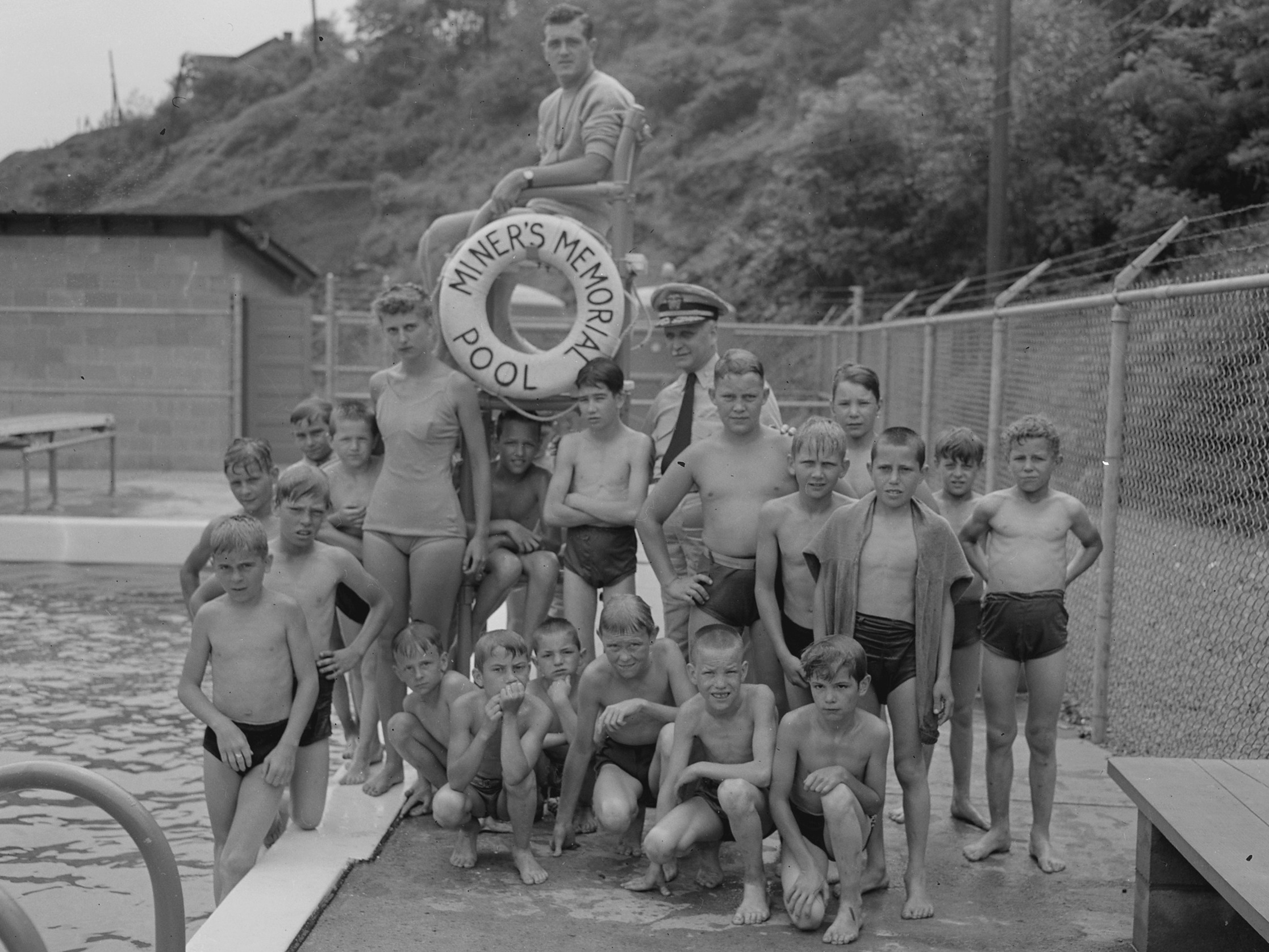
- Pool in Osage in 1946 with swimmers and Rear Admiral Joel T. Boone

- Location within the state of West Virginia Osage (the United States)
- Coordinates: 39°39′31″N 80°00′27″W
- Country: United States
- State: West Virginia
- County: Monongalia
- Elevation: 873 ft (266 m)
- Time zone: UTC-5 (Eastern (EST))
  - Summer (DST): UTC-4 (EDT)
- GNIS feature ID: 1544449

Osage is an unincorporated community in Monongalia County, West Virginia, United States. It lies across the Monongahela River from Morgantown.

The community was named after the Osage Indians.

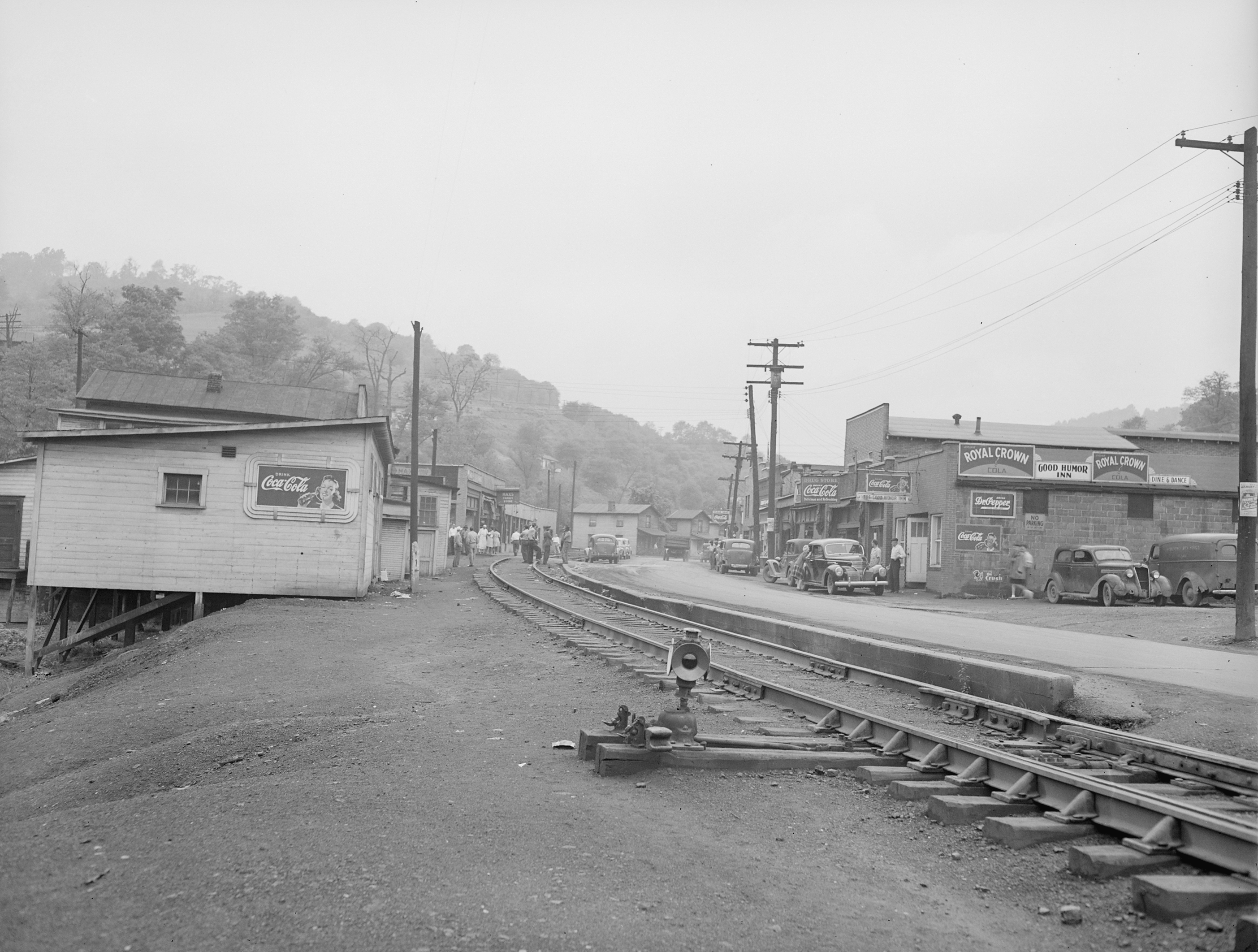
1946 Street scene in Osage
