= Price Hill, Monongalia County, West Virginia =

Price Hill, West Virginia
- Unincorporated community
- Location within West Virginia Location within the United States
- Coordinates: 39°36′15″N 79°59′47″W
- Country: United States
- State: West Virginia
- County: Monongalia
- Elevation: 1,257 ft (383 m)
- Time zone: UTC-5 (Eastern (EST))
  - Summer (DST): UTC-4 (EDT)
- Area codes: 304 & 681
- GNIS feature ID: 1555409

Price Hill is an unincorporated community in Monongalia County, West Virginia, United States. Price Hill is 3 miles (4.8 km) southwest of Morgantown.
