= Ringgold, West Virginia =

Ringgold
- Unincorporated community
- Location within the state of West Virginia Ringgold (the United States)
- Coordinates: 39°33′48″N 79°56′35″W
- Country: United States
- State: West Virginia
- County: Monongalia
- Elevation: 1,345 ft (410 m)
- Time zone: UTC-5 (Eastern (EST))
  - Summer (DST): UTC-4 (EDT)
- GNIS ID: 1545755

Ringgold is an unincorporated community in Monongalia County, West Virginia, United States.
