= Maple, West Virginia =

Maple
- Unincorporated community
- Location within the state of West Virginia Maple (the United States)
- Coordinates: 39°42′33″N 80°21′30″W
- Country: United States
- State: West Virginia
- County: Monongalia
- Elevation: 1,096 ft (334 m)
- Time zone: UTC-5 (Eastern (EST))
  - Summer (DST): UTC-4 (EDT)
- GNIS ID: 1555040

Maple is an unincorporated community in Monongalia County, West Virginia, United States.
