= Uffington, West Virginia =

Uffington
- Unincorporated community
- Location within the state of West Virginia Uffington (the United States)
- Coordinates: 39°35′11″N 79°58′34″W
- Country: United States
- State: West Virginia
- County: Monongalia
- Elevation: 850 ft (260 m)
- Time zone: UTC-5 (Eastern (EST))
  - Summer (DST): UTC-4 (EDT)
- GNIS ID: 1555850

Uffington is an unincorporated community in Monongalia County, West Virginia, United States.
