= Daybrook, West Virginia =

Unincorporated community in West Virginia, United States

Daybrook
- Unincorporated community
- Location within the state of West Virginia Daybrook (the United States)
- Coordinates: 39°39′58″N 80°12′47″W
- Country: United States
- State: West Virginia
- County: Monongalia
- Time zone: UTC-5 (Eastern (EST))
  - Summer (DST): UTC-4 (EDT)

Daybrook is an unincorporated community in Monongalia County, West Virginia, United States.
