= Jere, West Virginia =

- Unincorporated community
- Location of Jere in West Virginia Jere, West Virginia (the United States)
- Coordinates: 39°40′01″N 80°02′07″W
- Country: United States
- State: West Virginia
- County: Monongalia
- Elevation: 938 ft (286 m)
- Time zone: UTC-5 (Eastern (EST))
  - Summer (DST): UTC-4 (EDT)
- Area codes: 304 & 681
- GNIS feature ID: 1554804
- Other names: Scottsdale

Jere is an unincorporated community in Monongalia County, West Virginia, United States.

The community's name most likely is derived from Jeremiah.

In her efforts to improve living conditions in the area during the 1930s, First Lady Eleanor Roosevelt wrote, "I took many, many people to see this village of Jere, West Virginia, along Scott's Run, for it was a good example of what absentee ownership could do as far as human beings were concerned."
