= The Mileground, West Virginia =

The Mileground
- Unincorporated community
- Location within the state of West Virginia The Mileground (the United States)
- Coordinates: 39°38′33″N 79°55′50″W
- Country: United States
- State: West Virginia
- County: Monongalia
- Elevation: 1,220 ft (370 m)
- Time zone: UTC-5 (Eastern (EST))
  - Summer (DST): UTC-4 (EDT)
- GNIS ID: 1555800

The Mileground is an unincorporated community in Monongalia County, West Virginia, United States.
