= Pentress, West Virginia =

Pentress
- Census-designated place (CDP)
- Location within the state of West Virginia
- Coordinates: 39°42′37″N 80°9′37″W
- Country: United States
- State: West Virginia
- County: Monongalia

Area
  - Total: 0.609 sq mi (1.58 km^{2})
  - Land: 0.606 sq mi (1.57 km^{2})
  - Water: 0.003 sq mi (0.0078 km^{2})
- Elevation: 948 ft (289 m)

Population (2020)
  - Total: 135
  - Density: 223/sq mi (86.0/km^{2})
- Time zone: UTC−5 (Eastern (EST))
  - Summer (DST): UTC−4 (EDT)
- ZIP Codes: 26544
- GNIS feature ID: 2586865

Pentress is a census-designated place (CDP) in northern Monongalia County, West Virginia, United States. It lies along West Virginia Route 7 northwest of the city of Morgantown, the county seat of Monongalia County. Its elevation is 951 feet (290 m). "Pentress" is not the only name the community has had; at various times in its history, it has been known as Minors Mills, New Brownsville, Pentrees, Pentress Junction, Statler Town, Statlers Town, Statlersville, and Stradlerstown. The present name of Pentress was selected by an early settler who reportedly wanted a Welsh name. It has a post office with the ZIP Code of 26544. As of the 2020 census, its population was 135 (down from 175 at the 2010 census).
