= Van Voorhis, West Virginia =

- Unincorporated community
- Location within West Virginia Location within the United States
- Coordinates: 39°40′58″N 79°57′18″W
- Country: United States
- State: West Virginia
- County: Monongalia
- Elevation: 820 ft (250 m)
- Time zone: UTC-5 (Eastern (EST))
  - Summer (DST): UTC-4 (EDT)
- Area codes: 304 & 681
- GNIS feature ID: 1548608

Van Voorhis is an unincorporated community in Monongalia County, West Virginia, United States. Van Voorhis is located on the south bank of the Monongahela River across from West Van Voorhis, 3.5 miles (5.6 km) north of Morgantown.

The community was named after the local Van Voorhis family.
