= Crossroads, Monongalia County, West Virginia =

Unincorporated community in West Virginia, United States

Crossroads
- Unincorporated community
- Location within the state of West Virginia Crossroads (the United States)
- Coordinates: 39°39′33″N 80°18′7″W
- Country: United States
- State: West Virginia
- County: Monongalia
- Elevation: 1,060 ft (320 m)
- Time zone: UTC-5 (Eastern (EST))
  - Summer (DST): UTC-4 (EDT)
- GNIS ID: 1554228

Crossroads is an unincorporated community in Monongalia County, West Virginia, United States.
