= Tyrone, West Virginia =

Tyrone
- Unincorporated community
- Location within the state of West Virginia Tyrone (the United States)
- Coordinates: 39°38′22″N 79°51′31″W
- Country: United States
- State: West Virginia
- County: Monongalia
- Elevation: 1,453 ft (443 m)
- Time zone: UTC-5 (Eastern (EST))
  - Summer (DST): UTC-4 (EDT)
- GNIS ID: 1555849

Tyrone is an unincorporated community in Monongalia County, West Virginia, United States.
