= Rock Forge, West Virginia =

Rock Forge
- Unincorporated community
- Location within the state of West Virginia Rock Forge (the United States)
- Coordinates: 39°36′18″N 79°55′2″W
- Country: United States
- State: West Virginia
- County: Monongalia
- Elevation: 945 ft (288 m)
- Time zone: UTC-5 (Eastern (EST))
  - Summer (DST): UTC-4 (EDT)
- GNIS ID: 1545907

Rock Forge is an unincorporated community in Monongalia County, West Virginia, United States.

Rock Forge got its start in 1796 when a blast furnace opened at the site.
