= Dellslow, West Virginia =

Unincorporated community in West Virginia, United States

- Unincorporated community
- Location within West Virginia Location within the United States
- Coordinates: 39°36′25″N 79°53′31″W
- Country: United States
- State: West Virginia
- County: Monongalia
- Elevation: 978 ft (298 m)
- Time zone: UTC-5 (Eastern (EST))
  - Summer (DST): UTC-4 (EDT)
- ZIP code: 26531
- Area codes: 304 & 681
- GNIS feature ID: 1554284

Dellslow is an unincorporated community in Monongalia County, West Virginia, United States. Dellslow was established in 1798 and is located along West Virginia Route 7 near the southern border of Brookhaven. Dellslow has a post office with ZIP code 26531.

The community derives its name from Fredelsloh, Germany, the hometown of an early settler.

== Climate ==
The climate in Dellslow exhibits mild variations between high and low temperatures, and it receives sufficient rainfall throughout the year. Based on the Köppen Climate Classification system, Dellslow is categorized as having marine west coast climate, indicated by the abbreviation "Cfb" on climate maps.
