= Hagans, West Virginia =

Hagans
- Unincorporated community
- Location within the state of West Virginia Hagans (the United States)
- Coordinates: 39°37′13″N 80°7′46″W
- Country: United States
- State: West Virginia
- County: Monongalia
- Elevation: 1,040 ft (320 m)
- Time zone: UTC-5 (Eastern (EST))
  - Summer (DST): UTC-4 (EDT)
- GNIS ID: 1539825

Hagans is an unincorporated community in Monongalia County, West Virginia, United States.
