= Suncrest Lake, West Virginia =

Suncrest Lake
- Unincorporated community
- Location within the state of West Virginia Suncrest Lake (the United States)
- Coordinates: 39°39′52″N 79°58′34″W
- Country: United States
- State: West Virginia
- County: Monongalia
- Elevation: 974 ft (297 m)
- Time zone: UTC-5 (Eastern (EST))
  - Summer (DST): UTC-4 (EDT)
- GNIS ID: 1728397

Suncrest Lake is an unincorporated community in Monongalia County, West Virginia, United States.
