= Price, West Virginia =

Price
- Unincorporated community
- Location within the state of West Virginia Price (the United States)
- Coordinates: 39°42′29″N 80°7′42″W
- Country: United States
- State: West Virginia
- County: Monongalia
- Elevation: 955 ft (291 m)
- Time zone: UTC-5 (Eastern (EST))
  - Summer (DST): UTC-4 (EDT)
- GNIS ID: 1549883

Price is an unincorporated community in Monongalia County, West Virginia, United States.
