= National, West Virginia =

National
- Unincorporated community
- Location within the state of West Virginia National (the United States)
- Coordinates: 39°35′2″N 80°2′15″W
- Country: United States
- State: West Virginia
- County: Monongalia
- Elevation: 965 ft (294 m)
- Time zone: UTC-5 (Eastern (EST))
  - Summer (DST): UTC-4 (EDT)
- GNIS ID: 1544054

National is an unincorporated community in Monongalia County, West Virginia, United States.

The community took its name from a local mining company.
