= Wana, West Virginia =

Wana
- Unincorporated community
- Location within the state of West Virginia Wana (the United States)
- Coordinates: 39°42′13″N 80°17′54″W
- Country: United States
- State: West Virginia
- County: Monongalia
- Time zone: UTC-5 (Eastern (EST))
  - Summer (DST): UTC-4 (EDT)
- ZIP codes: 26590

Wana — formerly Wise — is an unincorporated community in northwestern Monongalia County, West Virginia, United States. It lies along West Virginia Route 7 northwest of the city of Morgantown, the county seat of Monongalia County. Its elevation is 1,030 feet (314 m). It has a post office with the ZIP code 26590.
