= Booth, West Virginia =

Unincorporated community in West Virginia, United States

- Unincorporated community
- Location within West Virginia Location within the United States
- Coordinates: 39°35′49″N 80°00′55″W
- Country: United States
- State: West Virginia
- County: Monongalia
- Elevation: 1,020 ft (310 m)
- Time zone: UTC-5 (Eastern (EST))
  - Summer (DST): UTC-4 (EDT)
- Area codes: 304 & 681
- GNIS feature ID: 1553949

Booth is an unincorporated community in Monongalia County, West Virginia, United States. Booth is located along County Route 45 near the Monongahela River, 3.9 miles (6.3 km) southwest of Morgantown. Booth had a post office, which opened on December 24, 1926, and closed on November 9, 2002. An early variant name was River Seam.
