= Kimberly, Monongalia County, West Virginia =

Kimberly
- Unincorporated community
- Location within the state of West Virginia Kimberly (the United States)
- Coordinates: 39°41′37″N 80°17′22″W
- Country: United States
- State: West Virginia
- County: Monongalia
- Time zone: UTC-5 (Eastern (EST))
  - Summer (DST): UTC-4 (EDT)

Kimberly is an unincorporated community in Monongalia County, West Virginia, United States. Kimberly is located along County Route 15, off West Virginia Route 7 near Blacksville.
