= Jaco, West Virginia =

Jaco
- Unincorporated community
- Location within the state of West Virginia Jaco (the United States)
- Coordinates: 39°40′2″N 79°55′5″W
- Country: United States
- State: West Virginia
- County: Monongalia
- Elevation: 1,234 ft (376 m)
- Time zone: UTC-5 (Eastern (EST))
  - Summer (DST): UTC-4 (EDT)
- GNIS ID: 1728339

Jaco is an unincorporated community in Monongalia County, West Virginia, United States.
