= West Sabraton, West Virginia =

West Sabraton
- Unincorporated community
- Location within the state of West Virginia West Sabraton (the United States)
- Coordinates: 39°37′0″N 79°55′41″W
- Country: United States
- State: West Virginia
- County: Monongalia
- Elevation: 1,024 ft (312 m)
- Time zone: UTC-5 (Eastern (EST))
  - Summer (DST): UTC-4 (EDT)
- GNIS ID: 1555953

West Sabraton is an unincorporated community in Monongalia County, West Virginia, United States.
