= Sunset Beach, West Virginia =

Sunset Beach
- Unincorporated community
- Location within the state of West Virginia Sunset Beach (the United States)
- Coordinates: 39°40′46″N 79°51′23″W
- Country: United States
- State: West Virginia
- County: Monongalia
- Elevation: 873 ft (266 m)
- Time zone: UTC-5 (Eastern (EST))
  - Summer (DST): UTC-4 (EDT)
- GNIS ID: 1555757

Sunset Beach is an unincorporated community in Monongalia County, West Virginia, United States.

Sunset Beach is located upon the Cheat Lake.
