= Deckers Creek =

Coordinates: 39°37′42″N 79°57′39″W

High flow areas of Deckers Creek

Deckers Creek is a 24.6-mile-long (39.6 km) tributary of the Monongahela River that runs through north-central West Virginia. It begins west of Arthurdale and flows southeast, then north, then northwest towards Morgantown, where it empties into the Monongahela River. The stream has been contaminated by various sources, though largely due to extractive resource mining and improper sewage disposal. Recently, a conservation effort has been launched and conditions are improving, as the area continues to develop for recreational purposes.

== Geography ==
Deckers Creek is a major tributary of the Monongahela River with an approximate drainage area of 63 square miles (160 km^{2}). The stream has its origin in Monongalia County at approximately 2,100 feet (640 m). From there it meanders southeast into Preston County, passing through Arthurdale, where it turns north and flows to Masontown. Here it turns sharply to the west and descends through a gorge back into Monongalia County and passes the community of Dellslow, then emptying into the Monongahela River in Morgantown, at an approximate elevation of 800 feet (240 m).

== Environmental issues ==
Acid Mine Drainage in Deckers Creek near Morgantown, WV

Deckers Creek has been plagued with environmental issues surrounding the extractive resource industry of the region and improper sewage disposal for many years. The admittance of Acid mine drainage (AMD) into Deckers Creek by surface mining has been the biggest detractor to the quality of the water throughout the past 200 years, but specifically beginning in the early 20th century. A conservation effort beginning in the late 1990s, and spearheaded by the NPO "Friends of Deckers Creek", has focused community and regional attention on the area, and has been crucial in the restoration of water quality.

== Cultural history ==
Deckers Creek was first settled by Europeans in the mid-18th century, by a group of colonists led by brothers Tobias, Garret, and John Decker, from which the creek's name is derived. Prior to the Decker settlement, the area had been inhabited by various Native American tribes for thousands of years. The Decker colony was short-lived due to Native American attacks, but the region was permanently inhabited by Europeans several years later. By the end of the 18th century, a burgeoning industry was developing along the creek, and by the late 19th century the B&O Railroad had been constructed along the creek's banks.

== Recreation ==
Deckers Creek is the site of one of many former railroad grades developed by the Rails to Trails organization into a public recreation area used as a cycling and foot path. The trail was originally the site of the Morgantown and Kingwood Railroad. The rail trail is a popular recreational site in the area, and hosts a variety of events, such as an annual race, sponsored by Friends of Deckers Creek to promote environmental awareness in the watershed. Other recreational activities include popular swimming destinations near Greer, and in the spring the creek becomes a popular whitewater boating destination.

== See also ==
- List of rivers of West Virginia
