= Little Falls, West Virginia =

- Unincorporated community
- Location within West Virginia Location within the United States
- Coordinates: 39°33′24″N 79°59′59″W
- Country: United States
- State: West Virginia
- County: Monongalia
- Elevation: 906 ft (276 m)
- Time zone: UTC-5 (Eastern (EST))
  - Summer (DST): UTC-4 (EDT)
- Area codes: 304 & 681
- GNIS feature ID: 1542096

Little Falls is an unincorporated community in Monongalia County, West Virginia, United States. Little Falls is located along the Monongahela River, 5.5 miles (8.9 km) south-southwest of Morgantown.

The community was named after a small waterfall near the original town site.
