= Miracle Run, West Virginia =

Miracle Run
- Unincorporated community
- Location within the state of West Virginia Miracle Run (the United States)
- Coordinates: 39°40′38″N 80°16′4″W
- Country: United States
- State: West Virginia
- County: Monongalia
- Elevation: 1,030 ft (310 m)
- Time zone: UTC-5 (Eastern (EST))
  - Summer (DST): UTC-4 (EDT)
- GNIS ID: 1555138

Miracle Run is an unincorporated community in Monongalia County, West Virginia, United States.

The community was named after nearby Miracle Run.
