= Macdale, West Virginia =

Macdale
- Unincorporated community
- Location within the state of West Virginia Macdale (the United States)
- Coordinates: 39°43′9″N 80°13′59″W
- Country: United States
- State: West Virginia
- County: Monongalia
- Elevation: 997 ft (304 m)
- Time zone: UTC-5 (Eastern (EST))
  - Summer (DST): UTC-4 (EDT)
- GNIS ID: 1555020

Macdale is an unincorporated community in Monongalia County, West Virginia, United States.
