= Jakes Run, West Virginia =

Jakes Run
- Unincorporated community
- Location within the state of West Virginia Jakes Run (the United States)
- Coordinates: 39°39′29″N 80°10′16″W
- Country: United States
- State: West Virginia
- County: Monongalia
- Elevation: 1,010 ft (310 m)
- Time zone: UTC-5 (Eastern (EST))
  - Summer (DST): UTC-4 (EDT)
- GNIS ID: 1540800

Jakes Run is an unincorporated community in Monongalia County, West Virginia, United States.

The community takes its name from nearby Jakes Run.
