= Chestnut Ridge, West Virginia =

Unincorporated community in West Virginia, United States

Chestnut Ridge
- Unincorporated community
- Location within the state of West Virginia Chestnut Ridge (the United States)
- Coordinates: 39°38′57″N 79°56′30″W
- Country: United States
- State: West Virginia
- County: Monongalia
- Elevation: 1,207 ft (368 m)
- Time zone: UTC-5 (Eastern (EST))
  - Summer (DST): UTC-4 (EDT)
- GNIS ID: 1554127

Chestnut Ridge is an unincorporated community in Monongalia County, West Virginia, United States, adjacent to the city of Morgantown.
