= Halleck, West Virginia =

Halleck
- Unincorporated community
- Location within the state of West Virginia Halleck (the United States)
- Coordinates: 39°28′45″N 79°56′21″W
- Country: United States
- State: West Virginia
- County: Monongalia
- Elevation: 1,913 ft (583 m)
- Time zone: UTC-5 (Eastern (EST))
  - Summer (DST): UTC-4 (EDT)
- GNIS ID: 1554626

Halleck is an unincorporated community in Monongalia County, West Virginia, United States.

The community was named after General H. W. Halleck.
