= Henderson Ridge =

Ridge in West Virginia

Coordinates: 39°40′38″N 80°08′08″W

Henderson Ridge is a 1,467-foot-high (447 m) ridge in the U.S. state of West Virginia.

The ridge was named after James Henderson, a pioneer settler.
