= Opekiska, West Virginia =

Coordinates: 39°33′26″N 080°03′20″W

Opekiska
- Unincorporated community
- Interactive map of Opekiska
- Country: United States
- State: West Virginia
- County: Monongalia
- Time zone: Eastern (EST)
- FIPS code: 1555267

Opekiska was an unincorporated community located in Monongalia County, West Virginia, United States. The Opekiska Post Office is no longer open.

Opekiska was named after an Indian chief; the native name means "White Day".
