= McCurdyville, West Virginia =

McCurdysville
- Unincorporated community
- Location within the state of West Virginia McCurdysville (the United States)
- Coordinates: 39°36′44″N 80°10′21″W
- Country: United States
- State: West Virginia
- County: Monongalia
- Elevation: 1,017 ft (310 m)
- Time zone: UTC-5 (Eastern (EST))
  - Summer (DST): UTC-4 (EDT)
- GNIS ID: 1542917

McCurdyville is an unincorporated community in Monongalia County, West Virginia, United States.
