= Worley, West Virginia =

Worley
- Unincorporated community
- Location within the state of West Virginia Worley (the United States)
- Coordinates: 39°42′26″N 80°8′54″W
- Country: United States
- State: West Virginia
- County: Monongalia
- Elevation: 932 ft (284 m)
- Time zone: UTC-5 (Eastern (EST))
  - Summer (DST): UTC-4 (EDT)
- GNIS ID: 1549998

Worley is an unincorporated community in Monongalia County, West Virginia, United States. At one time, it was home to the Andy Post Office. Andy later became named Worley.

Worley most likely was named after the mother's maiden name of an early settler.
