= Saint Leo, West Virginia =

Saint Leo
- Unincorporated community
- Location within the state of West Virginia Saint Leo (the United States)
- Coordinates: 39°38′34″N 80°21′39″W
- Country: United States
- State: West Virginia
- County: Monongalia
- Elevation: 1,066 ft (325 m)
- Time zone: UTC-5 (Eastern (EST))
  - Summer (DST): UTC-4 (EDT)
- GNIS ID: 1549910

Saint Leo is an unincorporated community in Monongalia County, West Virginia, United States.
