= Fort Grand, West Virginia =

Unincorporated community in West Virginia, United States

Fort Grand
- Unincorporated community
- Location within the state of West Virginia Fort Grand (the United States)
- Coordinates: 39°34′31″N 80°5′7″W
- Country: United States
- State: West Virginia
- County: Monongalia
- Elevation: 981 ft (299 m)
- Time zone: UTC-5 (Eastern (EST))
  - Summer (DST): UTC-4 (EDT)
- GNIS ID: 1554492

Fort Grand is an unincorporated community in Monongalia County, West Virginia, United States.
