= Clinton Furnace, West Virginia =

Unincorporated community in West Virginia, United States

Clinton Furnace
- Unincorporated community
- Location within the state of West Virginia Clinton Furnace (the United States)
- Coordinates: 39°30′57″N 79°57′59″W
- Country: United States
- State: West Virginia
- County: Monongalia
- Elevation: 1,132 ft (345 m)
- Time zone: UTC-5 (Eastern (EST))
  - Summer (DST): UTC-4 (EDT)
- GNIS ID: 1554154

Clinton Furnace is an unincorporated community in Monongalia County, West Virginia, United States.
