= Pedlar Run =

Stream in West Virginia, U.S.

Coordinates: 39°40′48″N 80°06′32″W

Pedlar Run is a stream in the U.S. state of West Virginia.

Pedlar Run was named in memory of two peddlers who died of exposure near the stream.

== See also ==
- List of rivers of West Virginia
