= Hoard, West Virginia =

Hoard
- Unincorporated community
- Location within the state of West Virginia Hoard (the United States)
- Coordinates: 39°42′17″N 79°55′56″W
- Country: United States
- State: West Virginia
- County: Monongalia
- Elevation: 814 ft (248 m)
- Time zone: UTC-5 (Eastern (EST))
  - Summer (DST): UTC-4 (EDT)
- GNIS ID: 1549745

Hoard is an unincorporated community in Monongalia County, West Virginia, United States.

The community was named after the local Hoard family.
