= Baker Ridge, West Virginia =

Unincorporated community in West Virginia, United States

Baker Ridge
- Unincorporated community
- Location within the state of West Virginia Baker Ridge (the United States)
- Coordinates: 39°40′26″N 79°56′52″W
- Country: United States
- State: West Virginia
- County: Monongalia
- Elevation: 1,161 ft (354 m)
- Time zone: UTC-5 (Eastern (EST))
  - Summer (DST): UTC-4 (EDT)
- GNIS ID: 1535151

Baker Ridge is an unincorporated community in Monongalia County, West Virginia, United States.
