= Behler, West Virginia =

Unincorporated community in West Virginia, United States

Behler
- Unincorporated community
- Location within the state of West Virginia Behler (the United States)
- Coordinates: 39°38′45″N 80°8′23″W
- Country: United States
- State: West Virginia
- County: Monongalia
- Elevation: 1,358 ft (414 m)
- Time zone: UTC-5 (Eastern (EST))
  - Summer (DST): UTC-4 (EDT)
- GNIS ID: 1549586

Behler is an unincorporated community in Monongalia County, West Virginia, United States.
