= Hog Eye, West Virginia =

Hog Eye
- Unincorporated community
- Location within the state of West Virginia Hog Eye (the United States)
- Coordinates: 39°34′9″N 79°54′44″W
- Country: United States
- State: West Virginia
- County: Monongalia
- Elevation: 1,552 ft (473 m)
- Time zone: UTC-5 (Eastern (EST))
  - Summer (DST): UTC-4 (EDT)
- GNIS ID: 1728451

Hog Eye was an unincorporated community in Monongalia County, West Virginia, United States.
