= Randall, West Virginia =

Randall
- Unincorporated community
- Location within the state of West Virginia Randall (the United States)
- Coordinates: 39°39′36″N 79°59′38″W
- Country: United States
- State: West Virginia
- County: Monongalia
- Elevation: 807 ft (246 m)
- Time zone: UTC-5 (Eastern (EST))
  - Summer (DST): UTC-4 (EDT)
- GNIS ID: 1545406

Randall is an unincorporated community in Monongalia County, West Virginia, United States. It lies 244 m (801 ft) above sea level.
