= Sandy, Monongalia County, West Virginia =

Sandy, West Virginia
- Unincorporated community
- Location within West Virginia Location within the United States
- Coordinates: 39°38′07″N 80°11′41″W
- Country: United States
- State: West Virginia
- County: Monongalia
- Elevation: 1,089 ft (332 m)
- Time zone: UTC-5 (Eastern (EST))
  - Summer (DST): UTC-4 (EDT)
- Area codes: 304 & 681
- GNIS feature ID: 1546401

Sandy is an unincorporated community in Monongalia County, West Virginia, United States.
