= Easton, West Virginia =

Unincorporated community in West Virginia, United States

Easton
- Unincorporated community
- Location within the state of West Virginia Easton (the United States)
- Coordinates: 39°39′9″N 79°54′46″W
- Country: United States
- State: West Virginia
- County: Monongalia
- Elevation: 1,033 ft (315 m)
- Time zone: UTC-5 (Eastern (EST))
  - Summer (DST): UTC-4 (EDT)
- GNIS ID: 1554361

Easton is an unincorporated community in Monongalia County, West Virginia, United States.

The community most likely was so named on account of its location east of Morgantown.
