= Bula, West Virginia =

Unincorporated community in West Virginia, United States

Bula
- Unincorporated community
- Location within the state of West Virginia Bula (the United States)
- Coordinates: 39°42′11″N 80°15′26″W
- Country: United States
- State: West Virginia
- County: Monongalia
- Elevation: 978 ft (298 m)
- Time zone: UTC-5 (Eastern (EST))
  - Summer (DST): UTC-4 (EDT)
- GNIS ID: 1536682

Bula was an unincorporated community in Monongalia County, West Virginia, United States.
