= Greystone, West Virginia =

Greystone
- Unincorporated community
- Location within the state of West Virginia Greystone (the United States)
- Coordinates: 39°41′16″N 79°51′44″W
- Country: United States
- State: West Virginia
- County: Monongalia
- Elevation: 988 ft (301 m)
- Time zone: UTC-5 (Eastern (EST))
  - Summer (DST): UTC-4 (EDT)
- GNIS ID: 2029246

Greystone is an unincorporated community in Monongalia County, West Virginia, United States.
