= Gum Spring, West Virginia =

Gum Spring
- Unincorporated community
- Location within the state of West Virginia Gum Spring (the United States)
- Coordinates: 39°31′6″N 79°54′37″W
- Country: United States
- State: West Virginia
- County: Monongalia
- Elevation: 2,014 ft (614 m)
- Time zone: UTC-5 (Eastern (EST))
  - Summer (DST): UTC-4 (EDT)
- GNIS ID: 1549719

Gum Spring is an unincorporated community in Monongalia County, West Virginia, United States.
