= Klondike, West Virginia =

Klondike
- Unincorporated community
- Location within the state of West Virginia Klondike (the United States)
- Coordinates: 39°38′4″N 80°17′14″W
- Country: United States
- State: West Virginia
- County: Monongalia
- Elevation: 1,535 ft (468 m)
- Time zone: UTC-5 (Eastern (EST))
  - Summer (DST): UTC-4 (EDT)
- GNIS ID: 1549774

Klondike is an unincorporated community in Monongalia County, West Virginia, United States.
