= Flaggy Meadow, West Virginia =

Unincorporated community in West Virginia, United States

Flaggy Meadow
- Unincorporated community
- Location within the state of West Virginia Flaggy Meadow (the United States)
- Coordinates: 39°34′17″N 80°2′3″W
- Country: United States
- State: West Virginia
- County: Monongalia
- Elevation: 873 ft (266 m)
- Time zone: UTC-5 (Eastern (EST))
  - Summer (DST): UTC-4 (EDT)
- GNIS ID: 1554468

Flaggy Meadow is an unincorporated community in Monongalia County, West Virginia, United States.
