= Brewer Hill, West Virginia =

Unincorporated community in West Virginia, United States

Brewer Hill
- Unincorporated community
- Location within the state of West Virginia Brewer Hill (the United States)
- Coordinates: 39°39′13″N 79°59′22″W
- Country: United States
- State: West Virginia
- County: Monongalia
- Elevation: 938 ft (286 m)
- Time zone: UTC-5 (Eastern (EST))
  - Summer (DST): UTC-4 (EDT)
- GNIS ID: 1553974

Brewer Hill is an unincorporated community in Monongalia County, West Virginia, United States.
