= Pierpont, Monongalia County, West Virginia =

Pierpont, West Virginia
- Unincorporated community
- Location within West Virginia Location within the United States
- Coordinates: 39°39′14″N 79°53′22″W
- Country: United States
- State: West Virginia
- County: Monongalia
- Elevation: 1,247 ft (380 m)
- Time zone: UTC-5 (Eastern (EST))
  - Summer (DST): UTC-4 (EDT)
- Area codes: 304 & 681
- GNIS feature ID: 1544807

Pierpont is an unincorporated community in Monongalia County, West Virginia, United States. Pierpont is located on County Route 67 near Interstate 68, 3.9 miles (6.3 km) east-northeast of Morgantown.
