= Browns Chapel, West Virginia =

Unincorporated community in West Virginia, United States

Browns Chapel
- Unincorporated community
- Location within the state of West Virginia Browns Chapel (the United States)
- Coordinates: 39°29′52″N 79°54′55″W
- Country: United States
- State: West Virginia
- County: Monongalia
- Elevation: 1,959 ft (597 m)
- Time zone: UTC-5 (Eastern (EST))
  - Summer (DST): UTC-4 (EDT)
- GNIS ID: 1536432

Browns Chapel is an unincorporated community in Monongalia County, West Virginia, United States.
