= Hilderbrand, West Virginia =

Hilderbrand
- Unincorporated community
- Location within the state of West Virginia Hilderbrand (the United States)
- Coordinates: 39°35′26″N 79°59′51″W
- Country: United States
- State: West Virginia
- County: Monongalia
- Elevation: 879 ft (268 m)
- Time zone: UTC-5 (Eastern (EST))
  - Summer (DST): UTC-4 (EDT)
- GNIS ID: 1554714

Hilderbrand is an unincorporated community in Monongalia County, West Virginia, United States.
