= Stewartstown, West Virginia =

- Unincorporated community
- Location within the state of West Virginia Stewartstown, West Virginia (the United States)
- Coordinates: 39°42′15″N 79°54′2″W
- Country: United States
- State: West Virginia
- County: Monongalia
- Elevation: 1,263 ft (385 m)
- Time zone: UTC-5 (Eastern (EST))
  - Summer (DST): UTC-4 (EDT)
- GNIS ID: 1547412

Stewartstown is an unincorporated community in Monongalia County, West Virginia, United States.

William Stewart and his wife Elizabeth Givens Stewart originally settled Stewardstown in 1771. It lies in the region of Monongalia County known as The Forks of Cheat, so named because that is the area where the Cheat empties (forks) into the Monongahela River.

It is nestled close to the Cheat River, off US-119 on a bend in the river.

There in 1775, Rev John Corbly organized the Forks-of-the-Cheat Baptist Church, the oldest continuously operating church in West Virginia.
