= Everettville, West Virginia =

Unincorporated community in West Virginia, United States

- Unincorporated community
- Location within West Virginia Location within the United States
- Coordinates: 39°33′49″N 80°03′47″W
- Country: United States
- State: West Virginia
- County: Monongalia
- Elevation: 896 ft (273 m)
- Time zone: UTC-5 (Eastern (EST))
  - Summer (DST): UTC-4 (EDT)
- Area codes: 304 & 681
- GNIS feature ID: 1554421

Everettville is an unincorporated community in Monongalia County, West Virginia, United States. Everettville is located along County Route 45 and Little Indian Creek, 7.3 miles (11.7 km) southwest of Morgantown. Everettville had a post office, which closed on November 2, 2002.

On April 30, 1927, an explosion at the Federal No. 3 Coal Mine in Everettville caused the death of approximately 111 coal miners, a disaster that ranks among the deadliest coal mine accidents in United States history.

Legendary college football coach John McKay was born in Everettville.
