= Crown, Monongalia County, West Virginia =

Unincorporated community in West Virginia, United States

Crown, West Virginia
- Unincorporated community
- Location within West Virginia Location within the United States
- Coordinates: 39°34′59″N 80°06′09″W
- Country: United States
- State: West Virginia
- County: Monongalia
- Elevation: 981 ft (299 m)
- Time zone: UTC-5 (Eastern (EST))
  - Summer (DST): UTC-4 (EDT)
- Area codes: 304 & 681
- GNIS feature ID: 1554231

Crown is an unincorporated community in Monongalia County, West Virginia, United States. Crown is located at the junction of County Highways 26 and 37, 8.5 miles (13.7 km) west-southwest of Morgantown.
