= Morgan Heights, West Virginia =

Morgan Heights
- Unincorporated community
- Location within the state of West Virginia Morgan Heights (the United States)
- Coordinates: 39°38′3″N 79°59′5″W
- Country: United States
- State: West Virginia
- County: Monongalia
- Elevation: 965 ft (294 m)
- Time zone: UTC-5 (Eastern (EST))
  - Summer (DST): UTC-4 (EDT)
- GNIS ID: 1555160

Morgan Heights is an unincorporated community in Monongalia County, West Virginia, United States.
