= Blacksville, West Virginia =

- Town
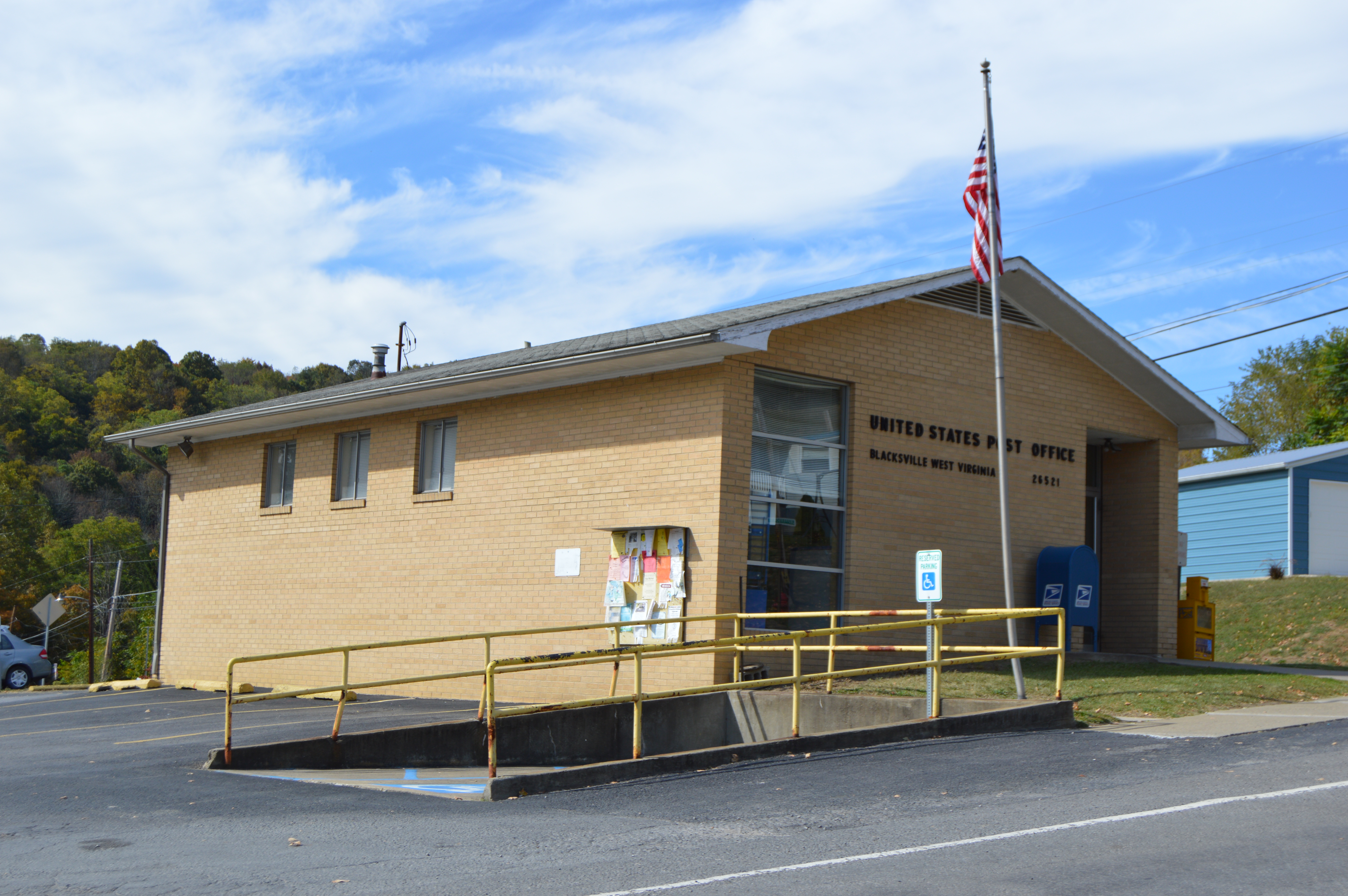
- The community's post office

- Location of Blacksville in Monongalia County, West Virginia.
- Coordinates: 39°43′12″N 80°12′45″W
- Country: United States
- State: West Virginia
- County: Monongalia

Government
  - Type: Mayor–council government

Area
  - Total: 0.31 sq mi (0.80 km^{2})
  - Land: 0.30 sq mi (0.78 km^{2})
  - Water: 0.0077 sq mi (0.02 km^{2})
- Elevation: 984 ft (300 m)

Population (2020)
  - Total: 118
  - Estimate (2021): 120
  - Density: 601.2/sq mi (232.11/km^{2})
- Time zone: UTC-5 (Eastern (EST))
  - Summer (DST): UTC-4 (EDT)
- ZIP code: 26521
- Area code: 304
- FIPS code: 54-08092
- GNIS feature ID: 1553918

Blacksville is an Incorporated Town in Monongalia County, West Virginia, United States. The population was 118 at the 2020 census. It is included in the Morgantown metropolitan area.

The Town of Blacksville has a C1 Census Class Code which indicates an active incorporated place that does not serve as a county subdivision equivalent. It also has a Functional Status Code of "A" which identifies an active government providing primary general-purpose functions.

== History ==
The town is named after David Black, a civil engineer from Virginia who came to the area in 1800. Black was eventually able to secure 100 acres (40 ha) of land for $50. Black then requested a patent in the summer of 1829, to lay out 160 acres of his land and sell plots in a move similar to creating a subdivision today. On February 3, 1830, the General Assembly of Virginia passed an act, establishing the town as a Municipal Corporation and naming it Blacksville. During the American Civil War, Blacksville became an unincorporated community on June 20, 1863. With the creation of the U.S. state of West Virginia, the West Virginia Legislature then re-incorporated the town in October 1897.

== Geography ==
Blacksville is located at 39°43′12″N 80°12′45″W (39.720036, -80.212562).

According to the United States Census Bureau, the town has a total area of 0.31 square miles (0.80 km^{2}), of which 0.30 square miles (0.78 km^{2}) is land and 0.01 square miles (0.03 km^{2}) is water.

== Demographics ==
Historical population
Census	Pop.	Note	%±
1880	106		—
1900	180		—
1910	204		13.3%
1920	218		6.9%
1930	269		23.4%
1940	261		−3.0%
1950	241		−7.7%
1960	211		−12.4%
1970	264		25.1%
1980	248		−6.1%
1990	168		−32.3%
2000	175		4.2%
2010	171		−2.3%
2020	118		−31.0%
2021 (est.)	120	▲	1.7%
U.S. Decennial Census

=== 2010 census ===
At the 2010 census there were 171 people, 69 households, and 46 families living in the town. The population density was 570.0 inhabitants per square mile (220.1/km^{2}). There were 79 housing units at an average density of 263.3 units per square mile (101.7 units/km^{2}). The racial makeup of the town was 97.1% White and 2.9% from two or more races. Of the 69 households 30.4% had children under the age of 18 living with them, 44.9% were married couples living together, 14.5% had a female householder with no husband present, 7.2% had a male householder with no wife present, and 33.3% were non-families. 24.6% of households were one person and 8.7% were one person aged 65 or older. The average household size was 2.48 and the average family size was 3.00.

The median age in the town was 35.2 years. 25.1% of residents were under the age of 18; 8.2% were between the ages of 18 and 24; 28.1% were from 25 to 44; 26.4% were from 45 to 64; and 12.3% were 65 or older. The gender makeup of the town was 51.5% male and 48.5% female.

=== 2000 census ===
At the 2000 census there were 175 people, 69 households, and 50 families living in the town. The population density was 576.2 inhabitants per square mile (222.5 inhabitants/km^{2}). There were 84 housing units at an average density of 276.6 units per square mile (106.8 units/km^{2}). The racial makeup of the town was 100.00% White. Of the 69 households 40.6% had children under 18 living with them, 42.0% were married couples living together, 23.2% had a female householder with no husband present, and 27.5% were non-families. 23.2% of households were one person and 14.5% were one person aged 65 or older. The average household size was 2.54 and the average family size was 2.98.

The age distribution was 30.9% under 18, 9.1% from 18 to 24, 26.9% from 25 to 44, 18.9% from 45 to 64, and 14.3% 65 or older. The median age was 34 years. For every 100 females, there were 82.3 males. For every 100 females age 18 and over, there were 75.4 males.

The median household income was $31,250 and the median family income was $36,875. Males had a median income of $29,167 versus $16,667 for females. The per capita income for the town was $13,461. About 12.5% of families and 17.0% of the population were below the poverty line, including 21.7% of those under the age of eighteen and 11.1% of those sixty five or over.

== Education ==
Monongalia County Schools serves Blacksville. Zoned schools include Mason Dixon Elementary School, and Clay-Battelle Middle/High School.

== Blacksville pottery ==
During the mid 20th century, Blacksville was well known for its pottery, made by local residents using native clay. Edgar Richardson taught pottery at Clay-Battelle high school and his pieces, signed "E.R. - Blacksville," are still being auctioned and collected. First Lady Eleanor Roosevelt visited Blacksville on June 28, 1938, to learn more about the "Blacksville pottery project."

== See also ==
- List of towns in West Virginia
