= Jakes Run (Dunkard Creek tributary) =

Stream in West Virginia, U.S.

Coordinates: 39°42′30″N 80°07′36″W

Jakes Run is a stream in the U.S. state of West Virginia. It is a tributary of Dunkard Creek.

Jakes Run was named after Jacob Statler, a pioneer settler.

== See also ==
- List of rivers of West Virginia
