= Georgetown, Monongalia County, West Virginia =

Unincorporated community in West Virginia, United States

Georgetown
- Unincorporated community
- Location within the state of West Virginia Georgetown (the United States)
- Coordinates: 39°35′41″N 80°5′22″W
- Country: United States
- State: West Virginia
- County: Monongalia
- Time zone: UTC-5 (Eastern (EST))
  - Summer (DST): UTC-4 (EDT)

Georgetown is an unincorporated community on U.S. Route 19 in Monongalia County, West Virginia, United States.

Georgetown most likely was named after George Pratt, an early settler.
