= National Register of Historic Places listings in Preston County, West Virginia =

Location of Preston County in West Virginia

This is a list of the National Register of Historic Places listings in Preston County, West Virginia. This is intended to be a complete list of the properties and districts on the National Register of Historic Places in Preston County, West Virginia. The locations of National Register properties and districts for which the latitude and longitude coordinates are included below, may be seen in an online map.

There are 22 properties and districts listed on the National Register in the county.

This National Park Service list is complete through NPS recent listings posted March 21, 2025.

Contents: Counties in West Virginia

Barbour - Berkeley - Boone - Braxton - Brooke - Cabell - Calhoun - Clay - Doddridge - Fayette - Gilmer - Grant - Greenbrier - Hampshire - Hancock - Hardy - Harrison - Jackson - Jefferson - Kanawha - Lewis - Lincoln - Logan - Marion - Marshall - Mason - McDowell - Mercer - Mineral - Mingo - Monongalia - Monroe - Morgan - Nicholas - Ohio - Pendleton - Pleasants - Pocahontas - Preston - Putnam - Raleigh - Randolph - Ritchie - Roane - Summers - Taylor - Tucker - Tyler - Upshur - Wayne - Webster - Wetzel - Wirt - Wood - Wyoming

== Current listings ==
	Name on the Register	Image	Date listed	Location	City or town	Description
1	Arthurdale Historic District	Arthurdale Historic District	February 1, 1989 (#88001862)	East and west of WV 92; 39°29′34″N 79°49′01″W	Arthurdale	
2	Brookside Historic District	Brookside Historic District	May 8, 2013 (#13000264)	George Washington Hwy. near Cathedral State Park; 39°19′33″N 79°32′06″W	Aurora	
3	Col. Thomas Brown House	Col. Thomas Brown House	March 17, 1994 (#94000212)	County Route 92/4 south of Reedsville; 39°28′31″N 79°48′42″W	Reedsville	
4	Coopers Rock State Forest Superintendent's House and Garage	Coopers Rock State Forest Superintendent's House and Garage	May 15, 1991 (#91000546)	Off Interstate 68 8 mi (13 km) east of Morgantown; 39°39′38″N 79°46′53″W	Morgantown	
5	Downtown Rowlesburg Historic District	Downtown Rowlesburg Historic District	November 30, 2005 (#05001350)	Buffalo St., Church St., portions of Main St., Poplar St., Railroad Alley and Railroad St. 39°20′50″N 79°40′14″W	Rowlesburg	
6	Elkins Coal and Coke Company Historic District	Elkins Coal and Coke Company Historic District	July 1, 1983 (#83003249)	Off WV 7; 39°32′42″N 79°48′36″W	Bretz	
7	Fairfax Stone Site	Fairfax Stone Site	January 26, 1970 (#70000653)	North of William at corner of Grant, Preston, and Tucker counties 39°11′42″N 79°29′16″W	Redhouse	
8	Gaymont	Gaymont	April 14, 1992 (#92000351)	U.S. Route 50 west of junction with WV 24; 39°19′31″N 79°32′08″W	Aurora	
9	A.W. Gribble Farm	A.W. Gribble Farm	December 30, 2009 (#09001192)	Loop Rd. 39°37′35″N 79°46′03″W	Pisgah	
10	Hagans Homestead	Hagans Homestead	July 14, 1993 (#93000617)	WV 26, 1 mile north of junction with Interstate 68 (Exit 23); 39°39′56″N 79°37′22″W	Brandonville	
11	Indian Rocks Dining Hall	Indian Rocks Dining Hall	January 8, 2003 (#02001688)	WV 7, 1 mile east of Reedsville; 39°30′37″N 79°45′55″W	Reedsville	
12	Kingwood Historic District	Kingwood Historic District	July 15, 1994 (#94000723)	Roughly bounded by Tunnelton, Main, Sigler, High, and Price Sts. and Brown Ave. 39°28′13″N 79°41′14″W	Kingwood	
13	James S. Lakin House	James S. Lakin House	January 9, 1997 (#96001573)	102 Aurora Ave. 39°26′37″N 79°32′51″W	Terra Alta	
14	James Clark McGrew House	James Clark McGrew House	July 9, 1993 (#93000618)	109 E. Main St. 39°28′20″N 79°41′11″W	Kingwood	
15	Old Hemlock	Old Hemlock	December 16, 2014 (#14001061)	17098 Brandonville Pike; 39°38′54″N 79°37′02″W	Bruceton Mills	
16	Ralphsnyder Decagonal Barn	Ralphsnyder Decagonal Barn	December 2, 1985 (#85003111)	County Route 52/2; 39°33′10″N 79°45′47″W	Masontown	
17	Reckart Mill	Reckart Mill	June 3, 1980 (#80004039)	West of Cranesville at junction of WV 28 and County Route 47/2; 39°33′12″N 79°31′41″W	Cranesville	
18	Red Horse Tavern	Red Horse Tavern	July 2, 1973 (#73001923)	1 mile east of Aurora on U.S. Route 50; 39°19′35″N 79°31′54″W	Aurora and Brookside	Boundaries increased on May 4, 1989
19	Terra Alta Bank	Terra Alta Bank	July 9, 1997 (#97000786)	109 E. Washington St. 39°26′42″N 79°32′45″W	Terra Alta	
20	Terra Alta First United Methodist Church		April 15, 2022 (#100007611)	301 West State Ave. 39°26′50″N 79°32′52″W	Terra Alta	
21	Tunnelton Railroad Depot	Tunnelton Railroad Depot	May 2, 1996 (#96000437)	Boswell St., north of the junction of Boswell and South Sts. 39°23′37″N 79°44′45″W	Tunnelton	
22	Virginia Furnace	Virginia Furnace	July 1, 1999 (#99000790)	WV 26, along Muddy Creek; 39°31′45″N 79°38′00″W	Albright	

== See also ==
- List of National Historic Landmarks in West Virginia
- National Register of Historic Places listings in West Virginia
