= Elkins Coal and Coke Company Historic District =

Historic district in West Virginia, United States

- U.S. National Register of Historic Places
- U.S. National Historic Landmark District
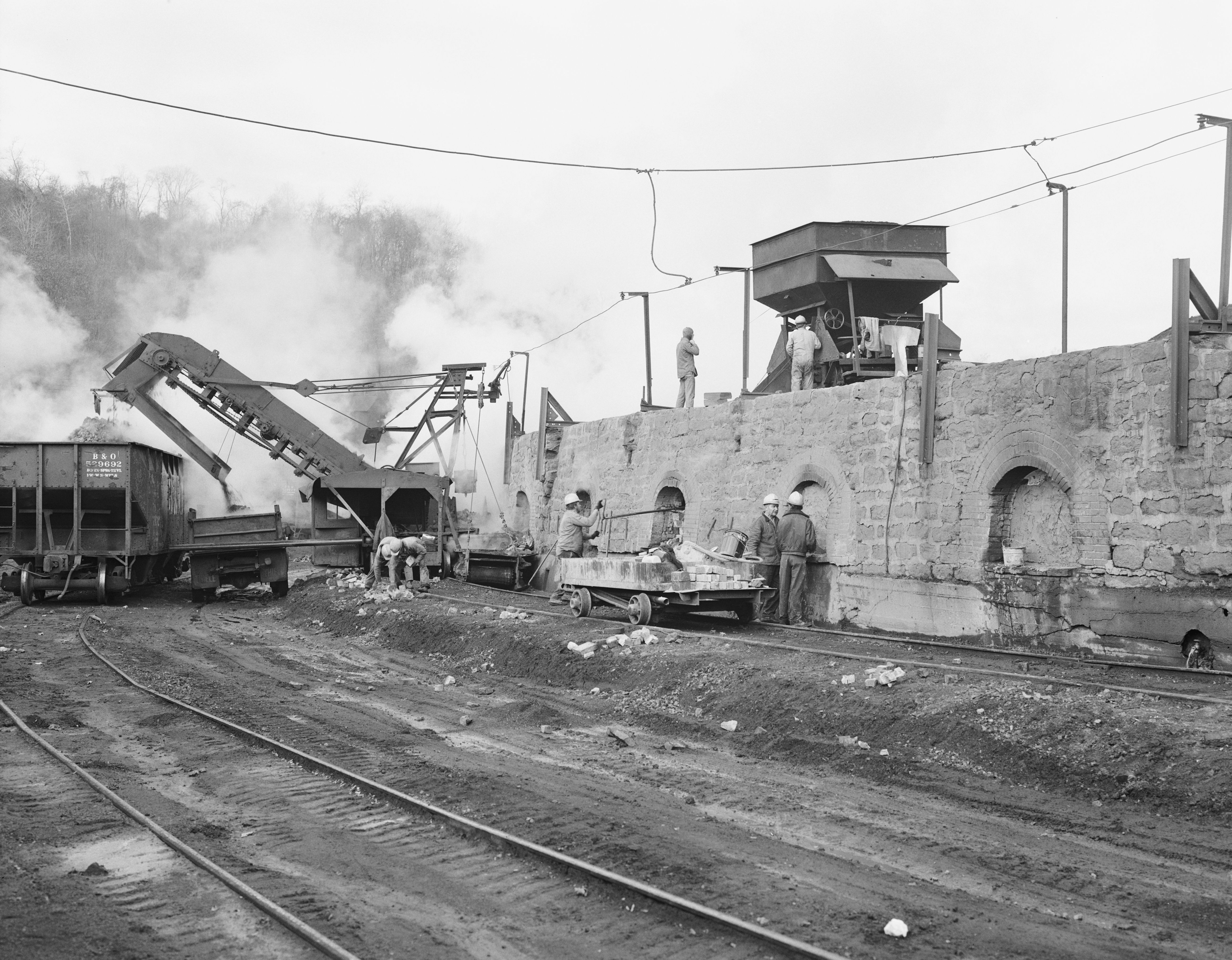
- Pulling and Charging the Ovens (HABS photo, 1974)

- Location within West Virginia Location within the United States
- Location: Bretz, Preston County, West Virginia
- Coordinates: 39°32′42″N 79°48′35″W
- Area: 36 acres (15 ha)
- Built: 1906
- Architect: Elkins Coal & Coke Co.
- NRHP reference No.: 83003249

Significant dates
- Added to NRHP: July 1, 1983
- Designated NHLD: May 4, 1983

The Elkins Coal and Coke Company Historic District is a historic industrial site near the crossroads village of Bretz in Preston County, West Virginia. It is the site of the last major coke manufacturing facility to use beehive ovens, and was a major industrial site in northern West Virginia in the first half of the 20th century. Surviving elements include a row of 140 beehive ovens. The site was declared a National Historic Landmark in 1983.

== Description and history ==
The former Elkins Coal and Coke Company site is located about 0.5 miles (0.80 km) southwest of Masontown, West Virginia and 0.25 miles (0.40 km) west of West Virginia Route 7, on a terrace overlooking Deckers Creek. Built into the side of the hills rising above the creek are a series of 140 stone and brick coke ovens, formed in an undulating shape conforming to the terrain. Each oven is roughly 12 feet (3.7 m) in diameter and 7 feet (2.1 m) high, with an exterior shell of hand-cut stone. The openings for accessing the oven are lined with fire brick, as is the interior chamber in which the coke is made. At the top of each oven's dome is an opening into which coal is fed, and there is an arched opening on the side, from which the finished coke is removed. The shape of the oven focuses the heat of the fire to more efficiently transform the coal.

When in operation, the ovens were fed from a track-mounted electrically powered hopper that ran on tracks above the ovens, and the finished coke was loaded onto railroad cars on a spur track that ran in front of them. The tracks facilitating these operations have been removed. The complex also originally had office, storage, and maintenance buildings, all of which have been demolished.

The complex went into production in 1907, after the railroad had been developed to Masontown. It was established by Stephen B. Elkins, who was, along with his father-in-law Henry G. Davis, one of the barons of West Virginia's coal industry in the late 19th century. The ovens here are among more than 400 that Elkins and Davis built throughout coal country. Elkins operated this facility until 1918, when it was acquired by the Bethlehem Steel Company. Bethlehem only operated the facility until 1920, moving production to more efficient facilities in Baltimore. The facilities were thereafter used only intermittently, and were permanently shuttered in the 1980s.

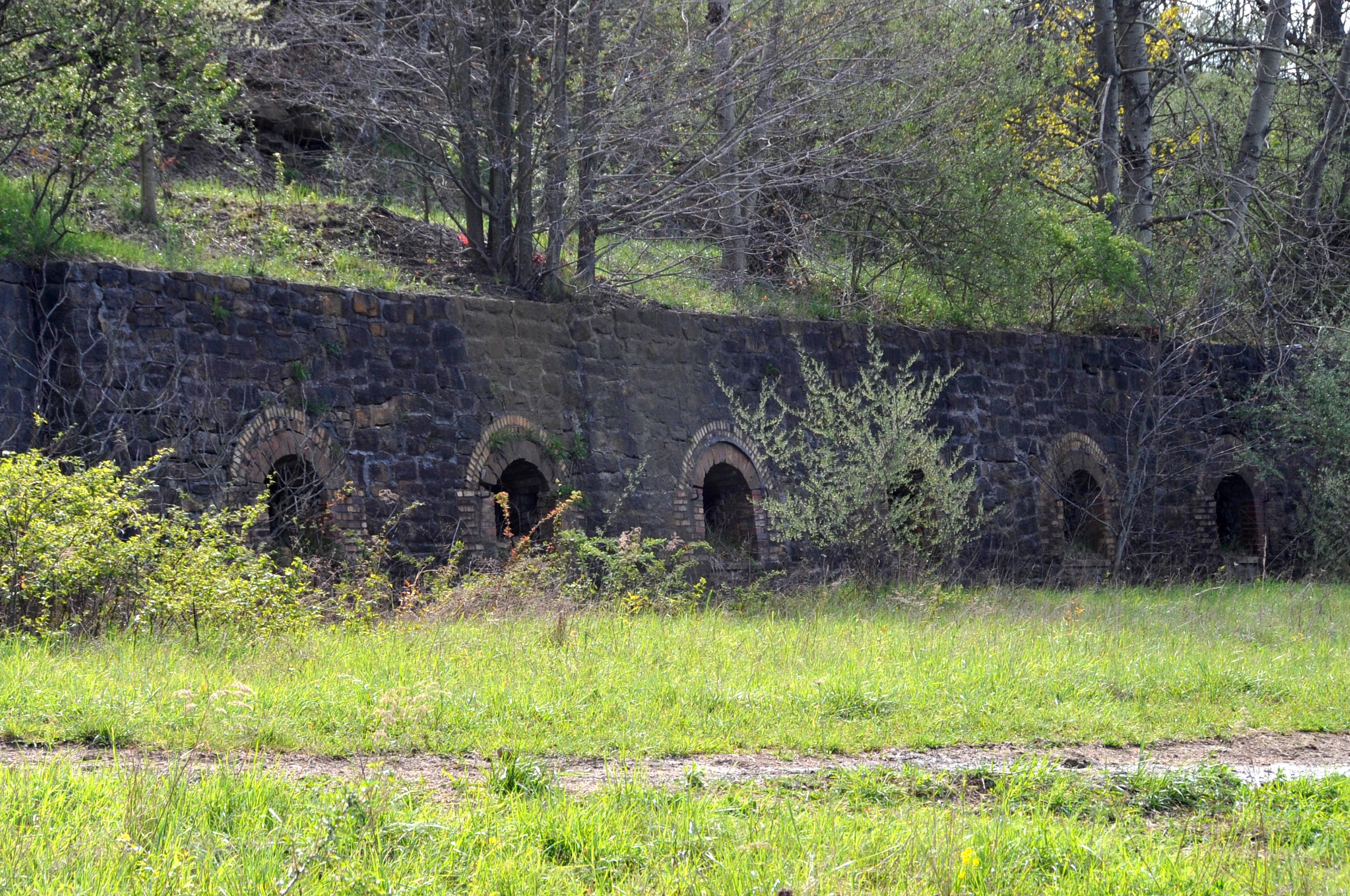
The ovens in 2012

== See also ==
- List of National Historic Landmarks in West Virginia
- National Register of Historic Places listings in Preston County, West Virginia
