= Angola Horror =

1867 train wreck in New York, US

Coordinates: 42°38′31″N 79°1′23″W

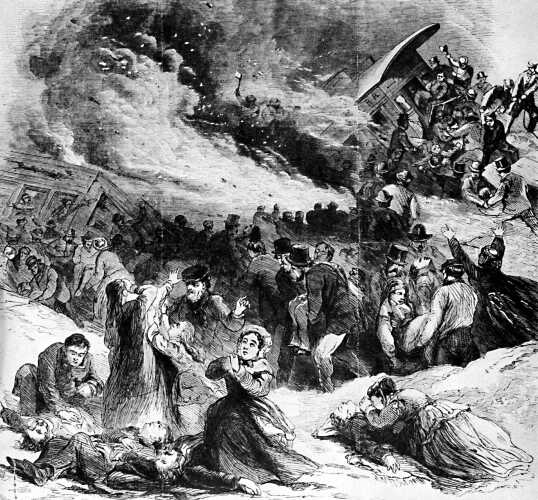
- The "Angola Horror" from Frank Leslie's Weekly, 1867

Details
- Date: December 18, 1867; 158 years ago 3:11 p.m.
- Location: Angola, New York, U.S.
- Country: United States
- Line: Lake Shore Railway
- Operator: Cleveland, Painesville and Ashtabula Railroad
- Incident type: Derailment
- Cause: Poor track condition

Statistics
- Trains: 1
- Deaths: 49

The Angola Horror (Note: The accident became known by this name within weeks of its occurrence.) was a train wreck that occurred in Angola, New York, on Wednesday, December 18, 1867, just after 3 p.m. The last coach of the Buffalo-bound New York Express of the Lake Shore Railway derailed at a bridge, slid down into a gorge, and caught fire, killing 49 people. At the time, it was one of the deadliest train wrecks in American history.

== Train ==
On the morning of December 18, 1867, the New York Express left Cleveland's Union Depot at 6:40 a.m. and was due to arrive in Buffalo, New York, at 1:30 p.m. John D. Rockefeller planned to make the journey, but arrived a few minutes late. His baggage made it onto the train; he did not. That day the train consisted of four baggage cars, one second-class car and three first-class cars. Each wooden passenger car had a pot-bellied stove at each end to provide heat, and kerosene lamps for light. The train lost time on the journey. By the time it passed Angola, it was running two hours and forty-five minutes late, traveling rapidly to try to make up lost time. Its last passenger stop before the accident was at Dunkirk; it also stopped at Silver Creek, but only to take on wood and water.

== Accident ==
The train was made up of so-called "compromise cars", which were designed to allow trains to run on both the 4 ft 8 1/2 in (1,435 mm) standard gauge of the New York Central Railroad as well as the 4 ft 10 in (1,473 mm) Ohio gauge of the Lake Shore Railroad. This allowed 3/4 inch (19 mm) lateral movement on the Ohio gauge and created instability. As the train neared the truss bridge over Big Sister Creek just east of Angola at 3:11, it ran over a frog (the crossing point of two rails). The front axle of the rear car was slightly bent, and the frog caused a wheel on the defective axle to jump off the track, derailing the rear car, which then swayed violently from side to side. The brakes were applied, but the train still traveled at considerable speed as it crossed the bridge. The last car uncoupled from the train and plunged down into the icy gorge. The second-to-last car also derailed, but made it to the other side of the gorge before sliding 30 feet (9 m) down the embankment. This car's sole passenger was killed.

== Deaths ==
The last car plunged 40 feet (12 m) down the ice-covered slope to the gully bottom and came to a rest, at a 45-degree angle, with a crash. The passengers were thrown together at the end of the car onto the overturned stove. The stove from the other end of the car fell upon them and released hot coals. The carriage quickly caught fire, the fuel from the kerosene lamps fueling the flames. Only two people escaped alive from the carriage; some may have suffocated, but the majority were burned alive. Witnesses spoke of hearing the screams of those trapped inside lasting for five minutes.

== Reporting ==
The accident, dubbed the "Angola Horror", gripped the imagination of the nation. Accounts of the tragedy, accompanied by grisly illustrations, filled the pages of newspapers for weeks and showed the tragedy of those trying to identify their loved ones among the charred remains that were pulled from the wreckage. Frank Leslie's Illustrated Newspaper carried five sketches of the scene and concluded, "This railroad disaster is accompanied by more horrible circumstances than ever before known in this country, and its results are truly sickening to contemplate".

== Aftermath ==
The accident and the public outcry that arose from it influenced many railroad reforms that soon followed. These included the replacement of loosely secured stoves with safer forms of heating, more effective braking systems, and the standardization of track gauges.

== Memorial ==
In 2008, the villagers of Angola reserved a 1,300-square-foot (120 m^{2}) parcel of land along Commercial Street and erected a sign to mark the site of the accident, dedicated to its victims. A second memorial to at least 17 unidentified victims buried in Forest Lawn Cemetery, Buffalo, was planned and later erected in 2015.

== See also ==
- Lists of rail accidents
- Wheeling rail disaster – accident that occurred in 1853 in a similar fashion
- 1887 Hartford Railroad Disaster – similar disaster
