= Masontown =

Masontown is the name of several places in the United States:

- Masontown, Pennsylvania
- Masontown, West Virginia
