= 1853 Mount Union rail disaster =

1853 train collision in Pennsylvania

Mount Union rail disaster
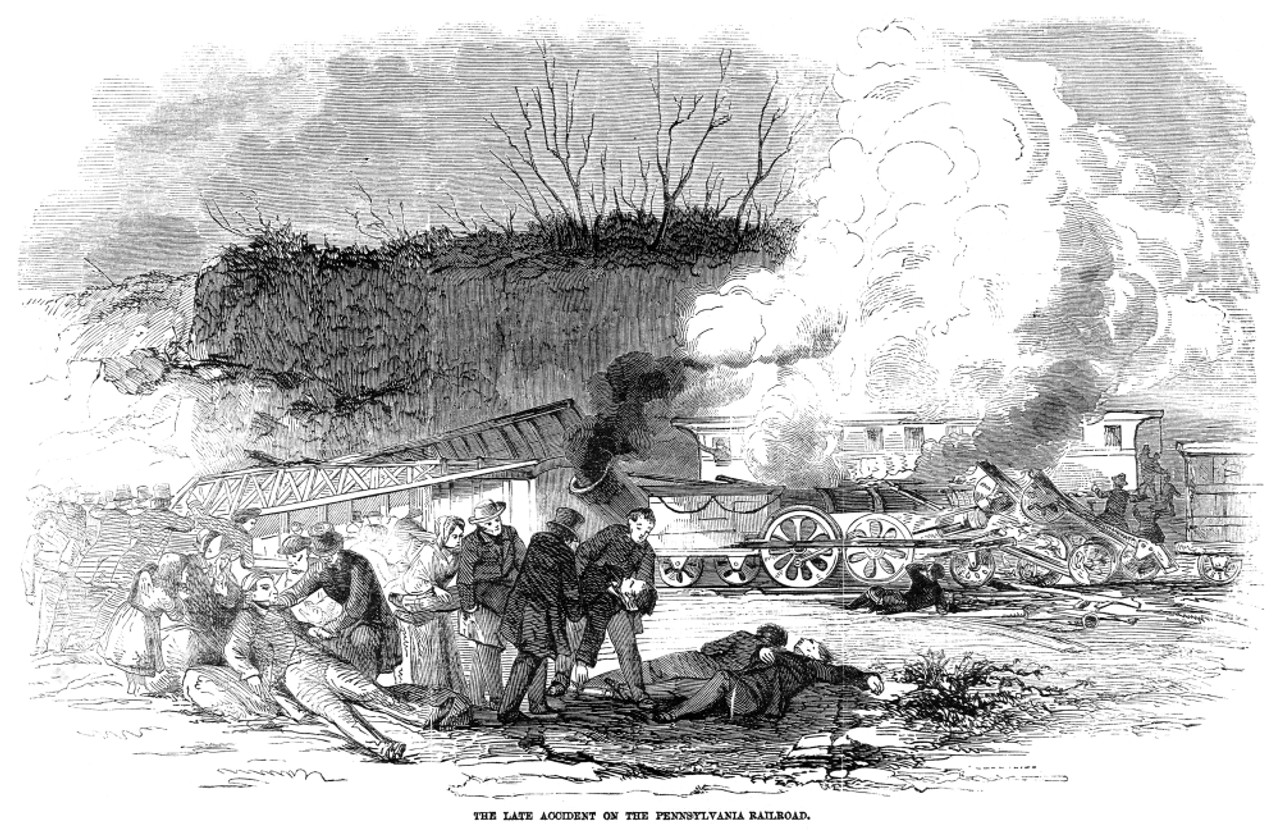
- Wood engraving of the accident

Details
- Date: March 4, 1853; 173 years ago
- Location: Mount Union, Pennsylvania
- Line: Main Line (Pennsylvania Railroad)
- Operator: Pennsylvania Railroad
- Incident type: Rear-end collision
- Cause: Neglect by brakeman

Statistics
- Trains: 2
- Deaths: 7

The Mount Union rail disaster was a rear-end collision that took place on March 4th, 1853. It was the first major railroad accident (that killed more than five), but would be soon be overshadowed by other railroad tragedies that would occur later that year.

== Background ==
The main line of the Pennsylvania Railroad was first opened in 1849; by 1850 the line was expanded to include Mount Union. The initial construction was a single line of tracks and it would not be until the end of the 19th century that the line would change into a double line.

== Accident ==
On March 4th, 1853 a passenger train carrying emigrants was forced to make an emergency stop while traveling through the Allegheny Mountains. While the crew of the passenger train were repairing mechanical issues, a mail train approached not seeing any red signals or reason to stop. The mail train soon collided the rear of the passenger train, shattering the passenger compartment. The boiler of the mail train then ruptured and additional passengers were also scalded to death as a result. Some newspapers recorded that the collision was between two passenger trains.

The cause of the accident was revealed to be the gross negligence of the passenger train's conductor. He had been sent back down the tracks to the flagman's shanty to put out a signal to warn approaching trains of the danger, but had fallen asleep instead.

Nine people would die as a result of the crash, making it the deadliest US rail accident at that time. However, by end of the month this accident would then be overshadowed by the Wheeling rail disaster which occurred on March 27th, (killing between 8 and 17), then the Greater Grand Crossing rail collision (which would occur the next month) as well as the Norwalk rail accident which occur on May 8th.
