= Bretz, West Virginia =

Bretz, West Virginia may refer to:

- Bretz, Preston County, West Virginia, an unincorporated community in Preston County, West Virginia
- Bretz, Tucker County, West Virginia, an unincorporated community in Tucker County, West Virginia
