= Cranesville =

Cranesville may refer to:

- Cranesville, New York
- Cranesville, Pennsylvania
- Cranesville, West Virginia
- Cranesville Historic District, in Dalton, Massachusetts
