= Terra Alta First United Methodist Church =

Methodist church in West Virginia, US

- U.S. National Register of Historic Places
- Location within West Virginia Location within the United States
- Location: 301 W State Avenue Terra Alta, West Virginia 26764
- Coordinates: 39°26′50″N 79°32′52″W
- Built: 1904
- Architect: John Charles Fulton
- Architectural style: Romanesque Revival architecture
- NRHP reference No.: 100007611
- Added to NRHP: April 15, 2022

The Terra Alta First United Methodist Church is a historic church located at the corner of West Virginia Route 7 and Chestnut Street in the mountain town of Terra Alta, Preston County, West Virginia. Prominently sited along the town's main thoroughfare, the church is one of the tallest structures in the area, rivaled only by the nearby Presbyterian Church and the First National Bank of Terra Alta.

== History ==
Constructed between 1900 and 1904, the church was designed by noted church architect John Charles Fulton of Uniontown, Pennsylvania. It is a distinguished example of Romanesque Revival architecture, characterized by its asymmetrical façade, rounded arches, heavy masonry, and multiple towers. Notable features typical of Fulton's work include a three-arch arcade on the front façade, a stained-glass dome in the sanctuary, a diagonal axis floor plan, and a hipped roof with prominent cross gables.

In 1956–1957, a three-story rear addition—known as the education building—was constructed to support the growing congregation. This addition became a hub for social, educational, and charitable activities. Both the original church and the education wing have been carefully preserved, with minimal alterations over time. As a result, the building retains a high degree of historic integrity in its design, materials, and craftsmanship.

== See also ==
- National Register of Historic Places listings in Raleigh County, West Virginia
