= A. W. Gribble Farm =

Historic house in West Virginia, United States

- U.S. National Register of Historic Places
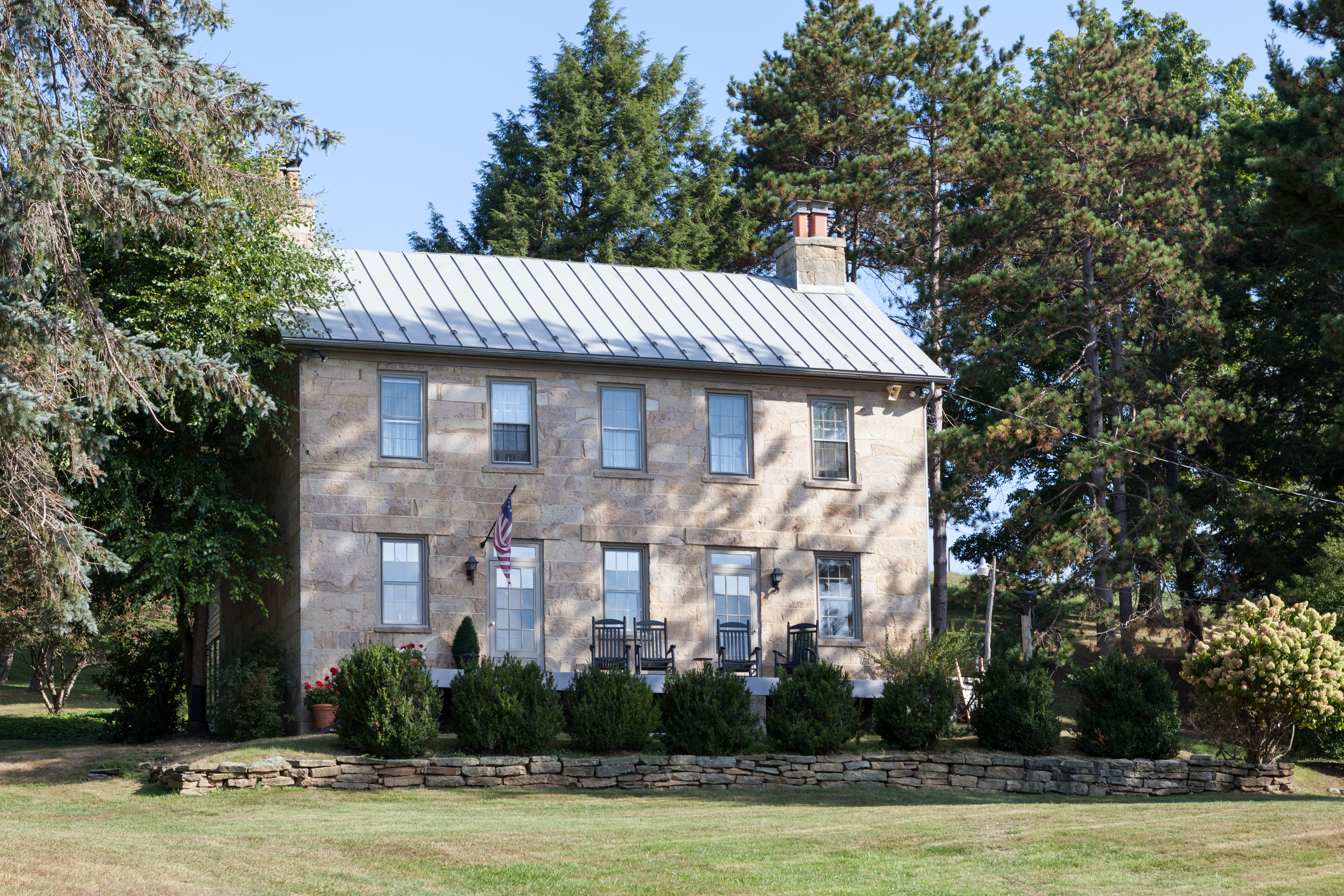
- The farm house in September, 2015

- Location within West Virginia Location within the United States
- Location: Loop Rd., near Pisgah, West Virginia
- Coordinates: 39.62634°N 79.7674°W
- Area: 4 acres (1.6 ha)
- Built: 1842
- Architectural style: I-house
- NRHP reference No.: 09001192
- Added to NRHP: December 30, 2009

A. W. Gribble Farm, also known as Deerwood Farm, is a historic house and farm located near Pisgah, Preston County, West Virginia. The house was built about 1842, and is a 2 1/2-story, five-bay, side-gabled, I house. It is built from square cut, regular coursed sandstone and measures 24 feet by 36 feet. Also on the property are a two-story springhouse (c. 1842), pantry building (c. 1842), and barn (c. 1870).

It was listed on the National Register of Historic Places in 2009.
