= 1853 West Virginia rail disaster =

1853 train derailment in West Virginia

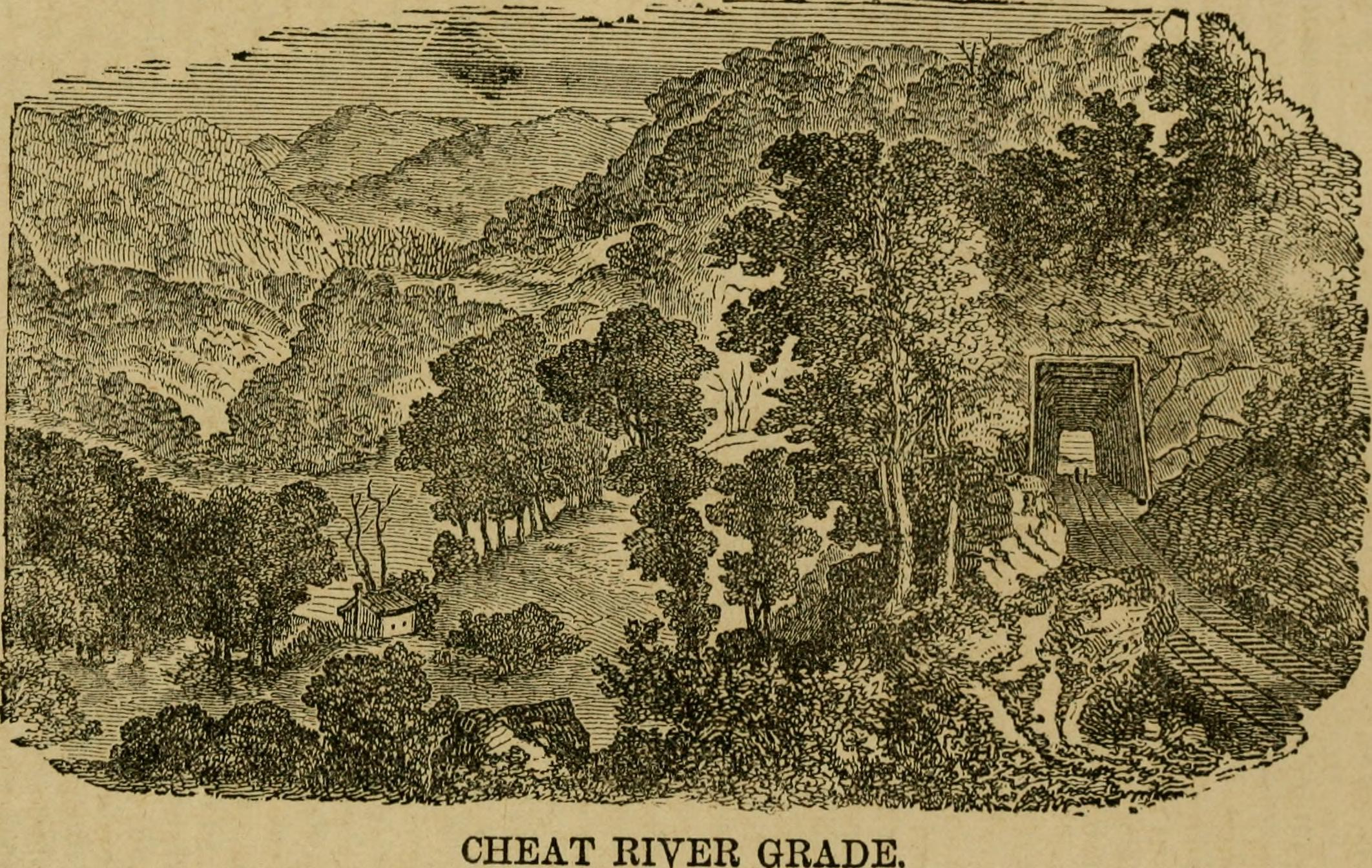
- Illustration of the bridge near where the accident occurred

Details
- Date: March 27, 1853; 3 p.m.
- Location: near Rowlesburg, West Virginia
- Line: Baltimore and Ohio Railroad (now Mountain Subdivision)
- Incident type: Derailment
- Cause: Poor rail quality

Statistics
- Trains: 1
- Passengers: 50
- Deaths: 8–17
- Injured: 25–40

A Baltimore and Ohio Railroad train derailed near Rowlesburg, West Virginia in March 1853.

== Incident ==
The Baltimore and Ohio Railroad was completed west to Wheeling, West Virginia, in January 1853. The line descended 116 feet (35 m) from Tunnelton to cross the Cheat River at Rowlesburg. On March 27, 1853, a two-engine train with three passenger cars and a baggage car was headed eastbound from Wheeling. Around 3:00 pm, while descending the Cheat River grade, the spikes holding the ties to the rails came loose. Two passenger cars fell about 100 feet (30 m) down the side of the river valley. The initial death toll was listed as 8; later sources claim 17 deaths. It was the first time in the history of the Baltimore and Ohio railroad that passengers perished as the result of an accident.
