= List of National Historic Landmarks in West Virginia =

West Virginia National Historic Landmarks (clickable map)

This article includes a List of National Historic Landmarks in West Virginia.

== Key ==
	National Historic Landmark
^{†}	National Historic Landmark District
^{#}	National Historic Site, National Historical Park, National Memorial, or National Monument
^{*}	Delisted Landmark

== National Historic Landmarks in West Virginia ==
There are 17 National Historic Landmarks in the state. The following is a complete list.

	Landmark name	Image	Date designated	Location	County	Description
1	Andrews Methodist Episcopal Church	Andrews Methodist Episcopal Church	October 5, 1992 (#70000667)	Grafton; 39°20′20″N 80°01′07″W	Taylor	Where the Mother's Day holiday was started.
2	Baltimore and Ohio Railroad Martinsburg Shops	Baltimore and Ohio Railroad Martinsburg Shops	July 31, 2003 (#03001045)	Martinsburg; 39°27′39″N 77°57′34″W	Berkeley	Architecturally significant railway buildings, also where the Great Railroad Strike of 1877 began.
3^{†}	Campbell Mansion	Campbell Mansion	April 19, 1994 (#70000651)	Bethany; 40°12′21″N 80°32′51″W	Brooke	Home of Alexander Campbell, founder and president of Bethany College
4	Clover Site	Clover Site	April 27, 1992 (#92001881)	Lesage; 38°35′24″N 82°13′54″W	Cabell	Archaeological site.
5^{†}	Davis and Elkins Historic District	Davis and Elkins Historic District	June 7, 1998 (#96001129)	Elkins; 38°55′44″N 79°50′57″W	Randolph	Historic district including Graceland and Halliehurst mansions
6^{†}	Elkins Coal and Coke Company Historic District	Elkins Coal and Coke Company Historic District	May 4, 1983 (#83003249)	Bretz; 39°32′42″N 79°48′35″W	Preston	140 beehive coke ovens, the last operated in the United States.
7	Grave Creek Mound	Grave Creek Mound	July 19, 1964 (#66000751)	Moundsville; 39°55′00″N 80°44′42″W	Marshall	The United States' largest cone-shaped burial mound, 62 feet (19 m) tall, 240 feet (73 m) diameter at base.
8^{†}	The Greenbrier	The Greenbrier	June 21, 1990 (#74002000)	White Sulphur Springs; 37°47′07″N 80°18′30″W	Greenbrier	Hotel and emergency relocation center for the U.S. congress.
9	Jefferson County Courthouse	Jefferson County Courthouse	December 11, 2023 (#100009833)	Charles Town; 39°17′21″N 77°51′37″W	Jefferson	
10^{†}	Matewan Historic District	Matewan Historic District	February 18, 1997 (#93000303)	Matewan; 37°37′23″N 82°09′59″W	Mingo	Site of bloody 1920 coal miners' strike depicted in John Sayles' film Matewan
11	Old Main, Bethany College	Old Main, Bethany College	June 21, 1990 (#70000652)	Bethany; 40°12′14″N 80°33′37″W	Brooke	Historic main building on Bethany College campus.
12	Reber Radio Telescope	Reber Radio Telescope	December 20, 1989 (#72001291)	Green Bank; 38°25′42″N 79°49′04″W	Pocahontas	First parabolic radio telescope, built by amateur astronomer Grote Reber.
13	Traveller's Rest	Traveller's Rest	November 28, 1972 (#72001288)	Kearneysville; 39°23′17″N 77°54′03″W	Jefferson	Homestead of General Horatio Gates and a rare surviving example of Virginia architect John Ariss's work.
14	Alexander Wade House	Alexander Wade House	December 21, 1965 (#66000752)	Morgantown; 39°37′31″N 79°57′30″W	Monongalia	Home of innovative educator Alexander Wade.
15	West Virginia Independence Hall	West Virginia Independence Hall	June 20, 1988 (#70000660)	Wheeling; 40°03′53″N 80°43′20″W	Ohio	Site of 1861–1863 pro-Union government of Virginia.
16	Weston Hospital	Weston Hospital	June 21, 1990 (#78002805)	Weston; 39°02′19″N 80°28′17″W	Lewis	One of the largest hand-cut stone masonry buildings in the United States.
17	Wheeling Suspension Bridge	Wheeling Suspension Bridge	May 15, 1975 (#70000662)	Wheeling; 40°04′06″N 80°43′38″W	Ohio	World's first long suspension bridge.

== See also ==
- National Register of Historic Places listings in West Virginia
- List of National Historic Landmarks by state
- List of National Natural Landmarks in West Virginia
