= Col. Thomas Brown House =

Historic house in West Virginia, United States

- U.S. National Register of Historic Places
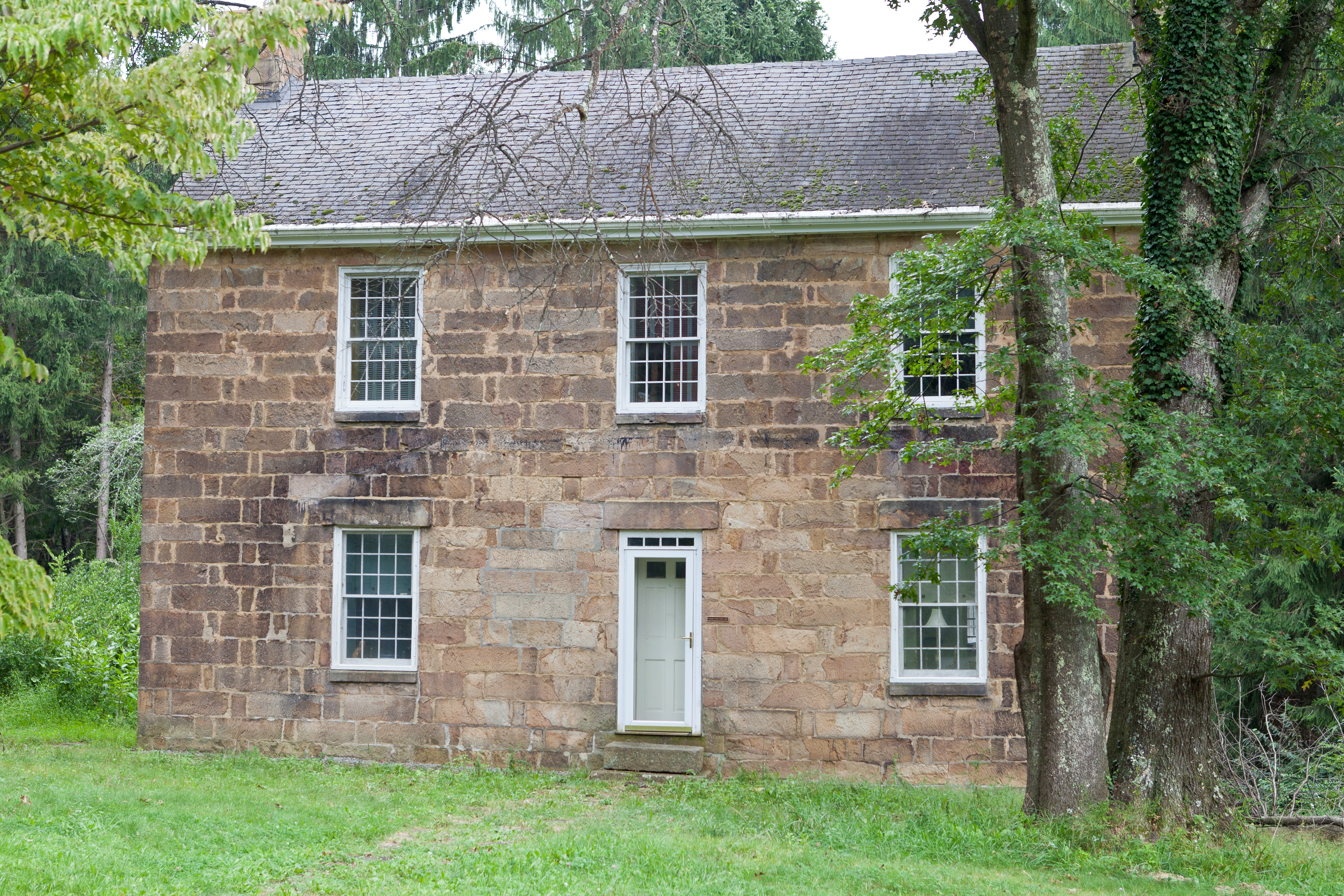

- Location within West Virginia Location within the United States
- Location: County Route 92/4 south of Reedsville, near Reedsville, West Virginia
- Coordinates: 39°28′31″N 79°48′42″W
- Area: less than one acre
- Built: 1837
- Architectural style: Early Republic, Federal
- NRHP reference No.: 94000212
- Added to NRHP: March 17, 1994

Col. Thomas Brown House is a historic home located near Reedsville, Preston County, West Virginia, United States. It was built in 1837, and is a two-story, sandstone Federal style dwelling. It measures 40 feet wide and 20 feet deep and has a gable roof.

It was listed on the National Register of Historic Places in 1994.
