= James S. Lakin House =

Historic house in West Virginia, US

- U.S. National Register of Historic Places
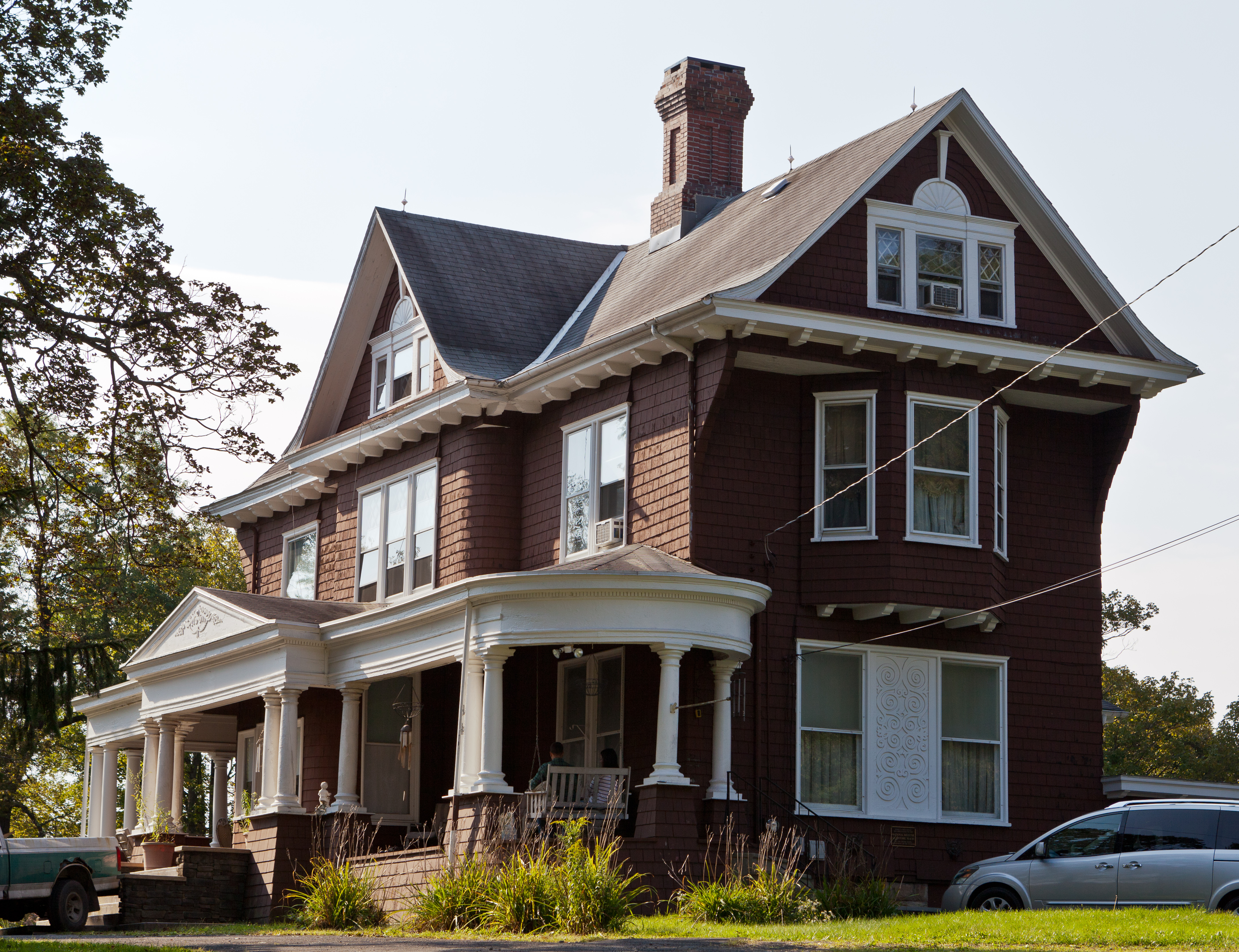

- Location within West Virginia Location within the United States
- Location: 102 Aurora Ave., Terra Alta, West Virginia
- Coordinates: 39.4435°N 79.5475°W
- Area: 1 acre (0.40 ha)
- Built: 1895
- Architectural style: Colonial Revival
- NRHP reference No.: 96001573
- Added to NRHP: January 9, 1997

The James S. Lakin House is a historic home in Terra Alta, Preston County, West Virginia.

Constructed in 1895, the house is a 2 1/2-story frame Colonial Revivalstyle dwelling. It has a T-shaped floor plan and is characterized by a roof structure with four intersecting gables. Notably, the front of the house boasts a full-width porch with a semi-circular end and a shallow hipped roof, which is supported by Tuscan order columns.

The James S. Lakin House was officially listed on the National Register of Historic Places in 1997.
