= Downtown Rowlesburg Historic District =

Historic district in West Virginia, United States

- U.S. National Register of Historic Places
- U.S. Historic district
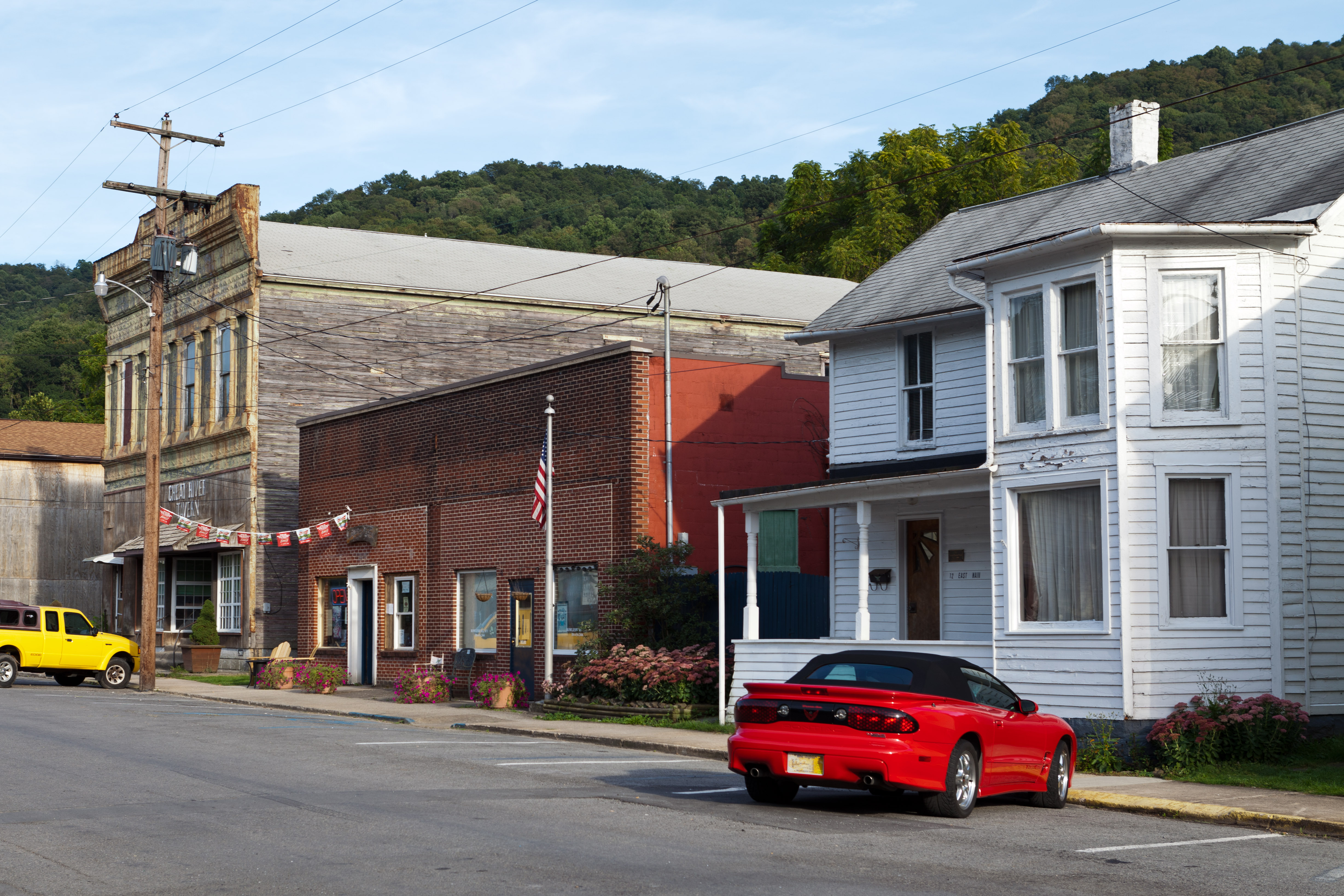

- Location within West Virginia Location within the United States
- Location: Buffalo St., Church St., Portions of Main St., Poplar St., Railroad Alley and Railroad St., Rowlesburg, West Virginia
- Coordinates: 39°20′50″N 79°40′14″W
- Area: 19 acres (7.7 ha)
- Architectural style: Queen Anne, Gothic Revival, et al.
- NRHP reference No.: 05001350
- Added to NRHP: November 30, 2005

Downtown Rowlesburg Historic District is a national historic district located at Rowlesburg, Preston County, West Virginia. The district encompasses 51 contributing buildings and 1 contributing site in the central business district and surrounding residential areas of Rowlesburg. Most of the commercial buildings are two story, frame and masonry buildings, dating from about 1900 to 1950. Notable buildings include the St. Paul's Methodist Protestant Church (1923), St. Philomena's Roman Catholic Church (c. 1890), Trinity Methodist Episcopal Church (1915), Rowlesburg School, Waybright House, Weaver House, Nassif Home and Store building (c. 1848), Rowlesburg Area Historical Society/IOOF building (1875), and Adams and Moore Store building (1907).

It was listed on the National Register of Historic Places in 2005.
