= Cranesville, West Virginia =

Unincorporated community in West Virginia, United States

- Unincorporated community
- Location within West Virginia Location within the United States
- Coordinates: 39°33′11″N 79°29′41″W
- Country: United States
- State: West Virginia
- County: Preston
- Elevation: 2,608 ft (795 m)
- Time zone: UTC-5 (Eastern (EST))
  - Summer (DST): UTC-4 (EDT)
- Area codes: 304 & 681
- GNIS feature ID: 1537805

Cranesville is an unincorporated community in Preston County, West Virginia, United States. Cranesville is located along County Route 47, 7.9 miles (12.7 km) north-northeast of Terra Alta.

== History ==
The first permanent settlement at Cranesville was made in the 1850s. The community was named for John Crane, proprietor.

The Reckart Mill, which is listed on the National Register of Historic Places, is located near Cranesville.
