= Terra Alta Bank =

- U.S. National Register of Historic Places
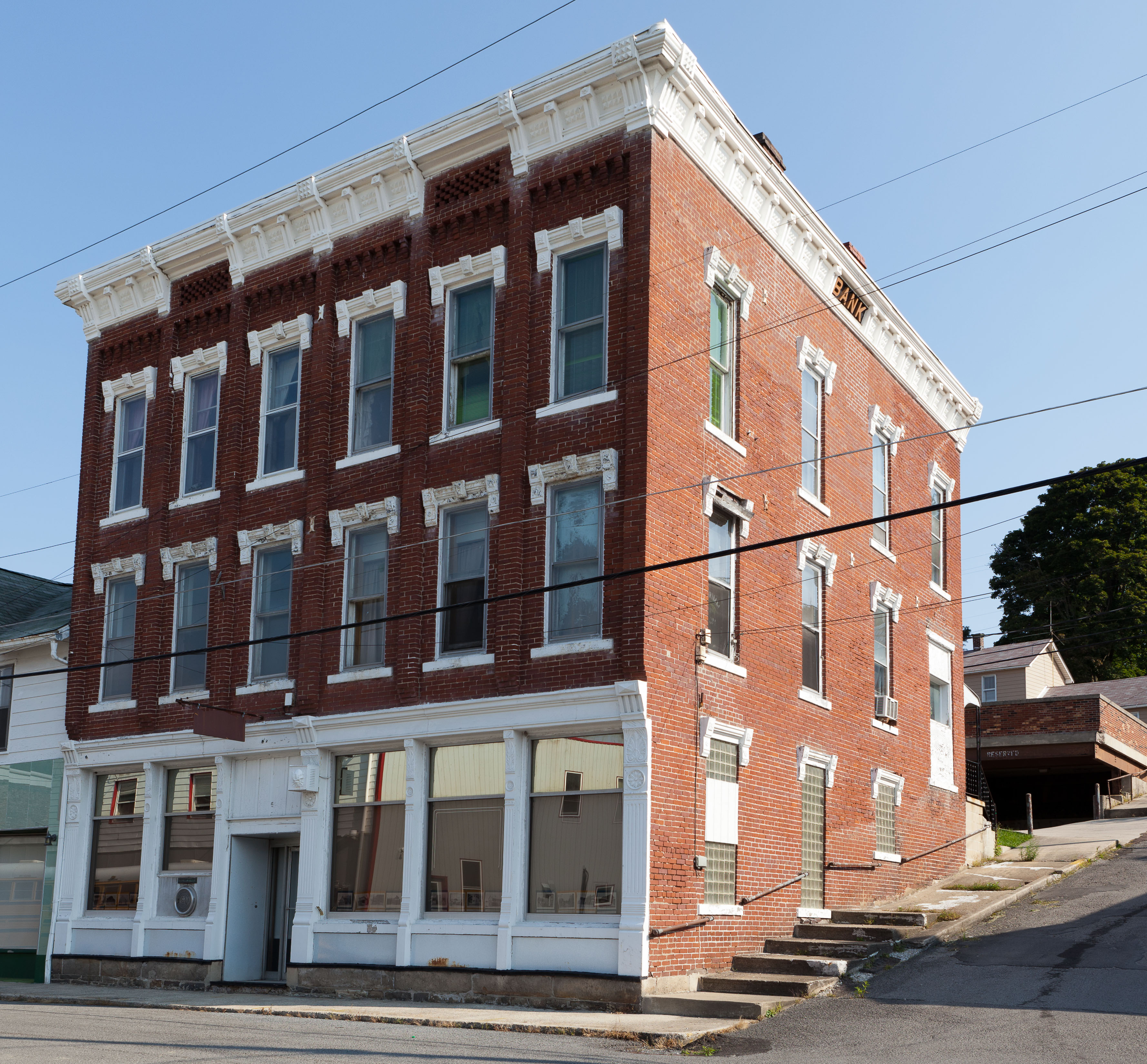

- Location within West Virginia Location within the United States
- Location: 109 E. Washington St., Terra Alta, West Virginia
- Coordinates: 39.4449°N 79.5459°W
- Area: less than one acre
- Built: 1893
- Built by: Gakes Brother and Sharp
- Architectural style: Late Victorian, Italianate
- NRHP reference No.: 97000786
- Added to NRHP: July 9, 1997

Terra Alta Bank, also known as The History House, is a historic bank building located at Terra Alta, Preston County, West Virginia. It was built in 1893, and is a three-story, six bay wide brick Italianate style commercial building. It has a cast iron storefront on the first floor of the main facade and metal window surrounds on the upper floors. The roof line of the building has a decorative bracketed cast iron cornice on three sides.

The Terra Alta Bank was chartered in 1891 as the second bank established in Preston County. In 1893, its board undertook construction of the three-story Italianate building designed by Gakes Brothers & Sharps. It was the only bank in Preston County to survive the Great Depression. The bank occupied the building until 1991, after which it was partly occupied by a local historical society.

It was listed on the National Register of Historic Places in 1997.
