= Ralphsnyder Decagonal Barn =

- U.S. National Register of Historic Places
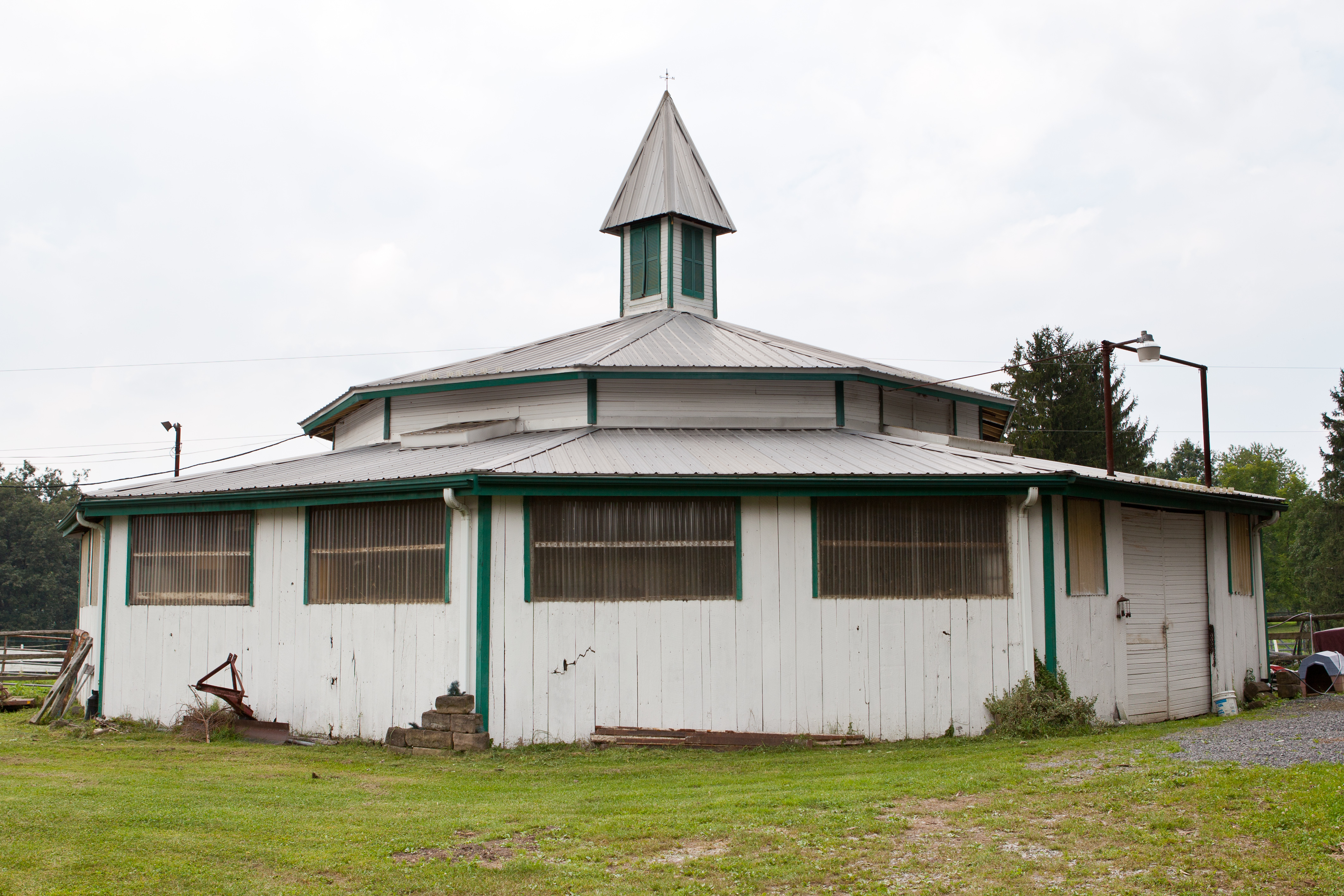

- Location within West Virginia Location within the United States
- Location: County Route 52/2, near Masontown, West Virginia
- Coordinates: 39.5528°N 79.7631°W
- Area: less than one acre
- Built: 1890
- Architect: Scott, Carl
- MPS: Round and Polygonal Barns of West Virginia TR
- NRHP reference No.: 85003111
- Added to NRHP: December 2, 1985

Ralphsnyder Decagonal Barn is a historic decagonal shaped barn located near Masontown, Preston County, West Virginia. The 10-sided barn was built in 1890, and is a frame building with an unusual steeple-shaped cupola. The barn was moved to its present site in 1981, which necessitated a number of replacements of portions of the original structure and roof. It is the only 10-sided barn known to have been constructed in West Virginia.

It was listed on the National Register of Historic Places in 1985.
