= Tunnelton station =

- Tunnelton Railroad Depot
- U.S. National Register of Historic Places
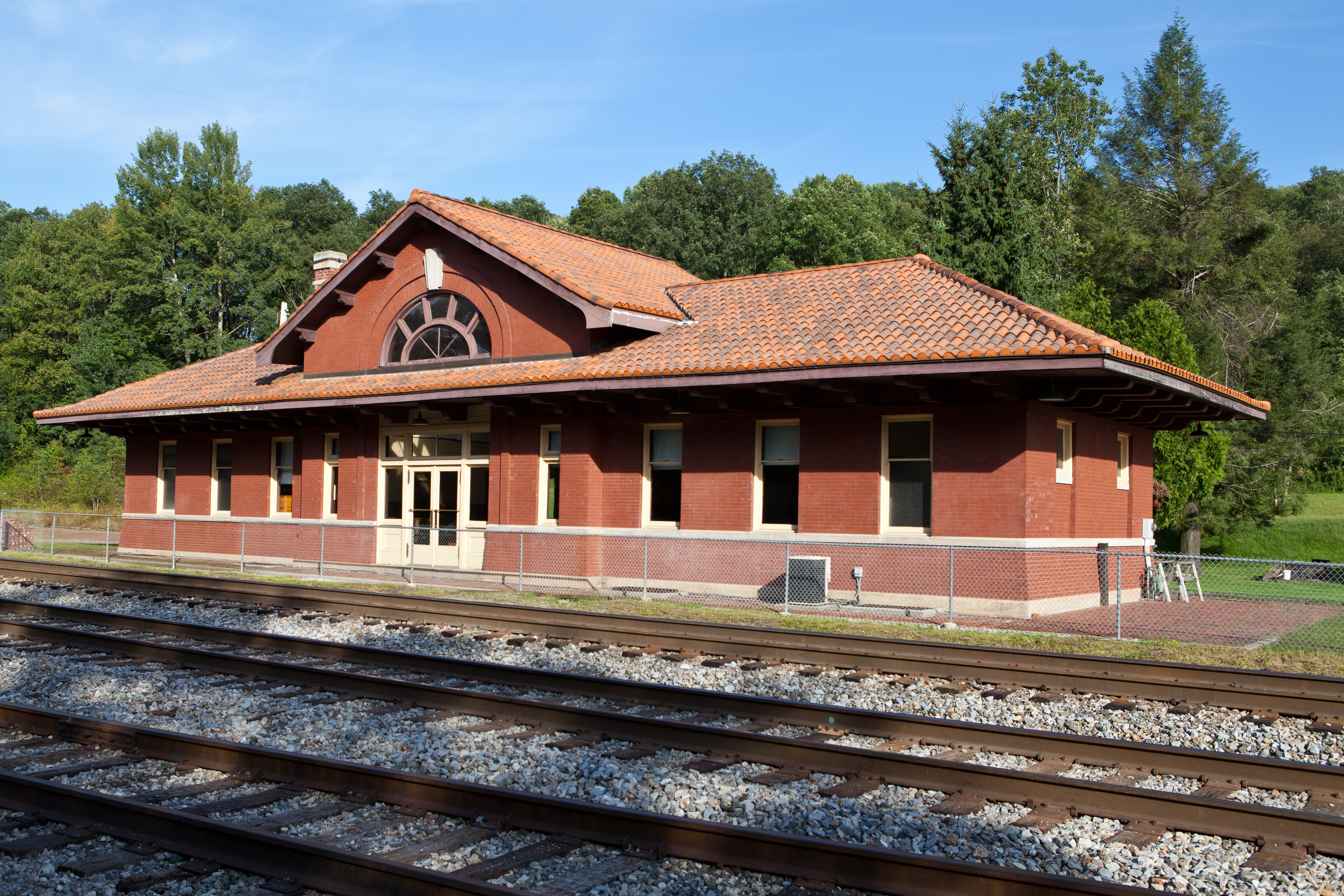
- The former Tunnelton Baltimore and Ohio Railroad Depot

- Location within West Virginia Location within the United States
- Location: Boswell St., N of the jct. of Boswell and South Sts., Tunnelton, West Virginia
- Coordinates: 39°23′37″N 79°44′45″W
- Area: 0.2 acres (0.081 ha)
- Built: 1912
- Built by: Baltimore and Ohio Railroad
- Architectural style: Late 19th And Early 20th Century American Movements, Early Commercial
- NRHP reference No.: 96000437
- Added to NRHP: May 2, 1996

Tunnelton station is a historic railway station located at Tunnelton, Preston County, West Virginia. It was built in 1912–1913, by the Baltimore and Ohio Railroad Company. It is a rectangular, one-story brick structure. The exterior walls are constructed of brick, stone and mortar, with ornate wood soffit, extended wood fascia, and Spanish style ceramic roof tile, topped with large tile caps. Passenger service ceased in 1968, and in 1994, it was purchased from CSX by the Tunnelton Historical Society.

It was listed on the National Register of Historic Places in 1996 as the Tunnelton Railroad Depot.

Preceding station	Baltimore and Ohio Railroad	Following station
Austen toward St. Louis	St. Louis Line	Blaser toward Cumberland
