= Virginia Furnace =

- U.S. National Register of Historic Places
- U.S. Historic district
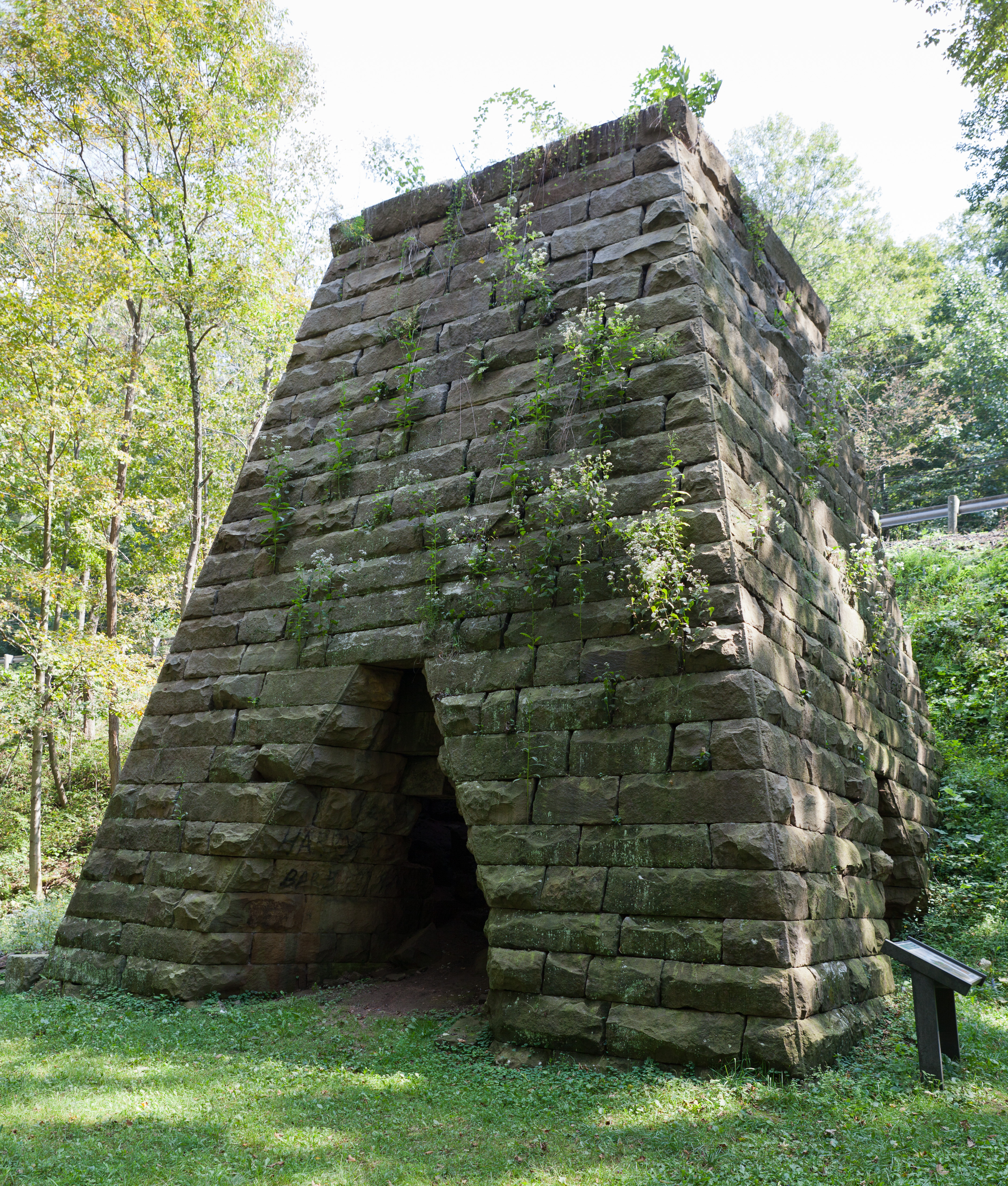

- Location within West Virginia Location within the United States
- Location: WV 26, along Muddy Creek, near Albright, West Virginia
- Coordinates: 39°31′45″N 79°38′0″W
- Area: 6.4 acres (2.6 ha)
- Architectural style: Stone Blast Furnace
- NRHP reference No.: 99000790
- Added to NRHP: July 1, 1999

Virginia Furnace, also known as Muddy Creek Furnace and Josephine Furnace, is a historic water powered blast furnace and national historic district located near Albright, Preston County, West Virginia. The district encompasses three contributing structures and one contributing site. The furnace was built in 1854, and was a "charcoal" iron furnace used to smelt iron. It is constructed of cut sandstone, and forms a truncated pyramid measuring approximately 34 feet square in plan and rising about 30 feet. The district includes the nearby wheel pit, blast machinery, and salamander. The furnace remained in operation until the 1890s, and was the last "charcoal" iron furnace to cease operating in northern West Virginia. In 1933, the Virginia Furnace was acquired by the Kingwood Chapter of the Daughters of the American Revolution who created a roadside park at the furnace site.

It was listed on the National Register of Historic Places in 1999.
