= Reckart Mill =

- U.S. National Register of Historic Places
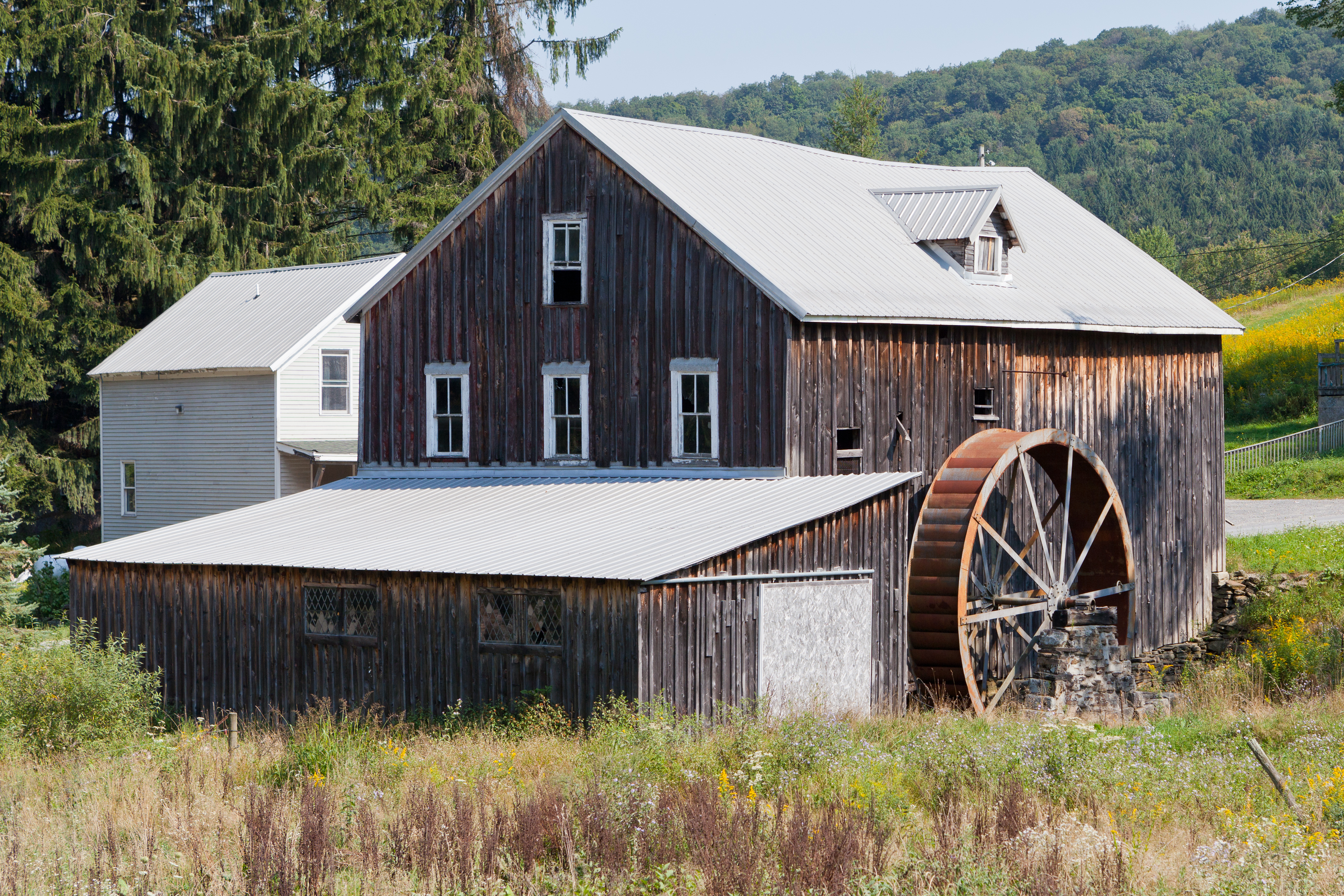

- Location within West Virginia Location within the United States
- Location: West of Cranesville at junction of WV 28 and County Route 47/2, near Cranesville, West Virginia
- Coordinates: 39.55328°N 79.52805°W
- Area: 0.3 acres (0.12 ha)
- Built: 1865
- Architect: Albright, A.S.
- NRHP reference No.: 80004039
- Added to NRHP: June 3, 1980

Reckart Mill, also known as Albright Mill, is a historic grist mill located near Cranesville, Preston County, West Virginia. It was built in 1865, and is a frame, 2 1/2-story gable roofed building that is built, in part, over Muddy Creek. It is notable for its interior structural beam support system of hand hewn pine timbers and mill machinery. Operations at Reckart Mill ceased in 1943. In 2017 the mill was torn down by the new owners and the surrounding area was clear cut by the owners.

It was listed on the National Register of Historic Places in 1980.
