= Reedsville, West Virginia =

- Town
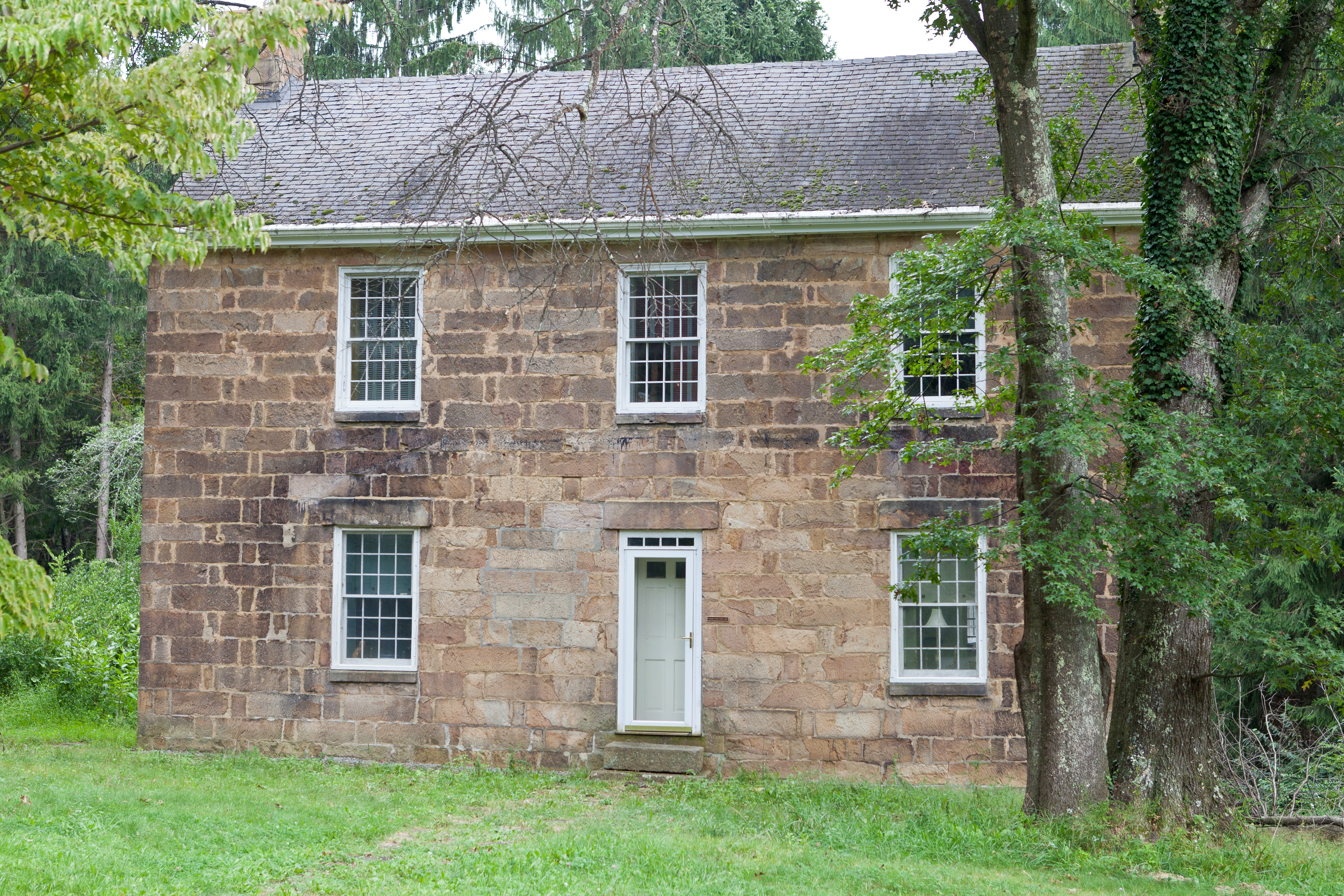
- Col. Thomas Brown House

- Logo

- Location of Reedsville in Preston County, West Virginia.
- Coordinates: 39°30′29″N 79°48′4″W
- Country: United States
- State: West Virginia
- County: Preston
- Settled: 1855
- Incorporated: 1906
- Named for: James Reed

Area
  - Total: 0.65 sq mi (1.68 km^{2})
  - Land: 0.65 sq mi (1.68 km^{2})
  - Water: 0 sq mi (0.00 km^{2})
- Elevation: 1,818 ft (554 m)

Population (2020)
  - Total: 530
  - Estimate (2021): 562
  - Density: 930.7/sq mi (359.33/km^{2})
- Time zone: UTC-5 (Eastern (EST))
  - Summer (DST): UTC-4 (EDT)
- ZIP code: 26547
- Area code: 304
- FIPS code: 54-67636
- GNIS feature ID: 1545487
- Website: https://reedsvillewv.gov/

Reedsville is a town in western Preston County, West Virginia, United States. The population was 530 at the 2020 census.

== History ==
Reedsville was named for James Reed, who moved to the area in 1827 and owned land covering most of the future townsite. The first house in the community was built in 1855, and the town was named in 1856. Reedsville was incorporated in 1906.

== Geography ==
Reedsville is located at 39°30′29″N 79°48′4″W (39.508114, -79.801189).

According to the United States Census Bureau, the town has a total area of 0.65 square miles (1.68 km^{2}), all land.

== Demographics ==
Historical population
Census	Pop.	Note	%±
1910	208		—
1920	254		22.1%
1930	345		35.8%
1940	324		−6.1%
1950	321		−0.9%
1960	398		24.0%
1970	379		−4.8%
1980	564		48.8%
1990	482		−14.5%
2000	517		7.3%
2010	593		14.7%
2020	530		−10.6%
2021 (est.)	562	▲	6.0%
U.S. Decennial Census

=== 2010 census ===
As of the census of 2010, there were 593 people, 256 households, and 160 families living in the town. The population density was 912.3 inhabitants per square mile (352.2/km^{2}). There were 281 housing units at an average density of 432.3 per square mile (166.9/km^{2}). The racial makeup of the town was 98.5% White, 0.5% African American, and 1.0% from two or more races. Hispanic or Latino of any race were 0.2% of the population.

There were 256 households, of which 30.1% had children under the age of 18 living with them, 47.7% were married couples living together, 10.9% had a female householder with no husband present, 3.9% had a male householder with no wife present, and 37.5% were non-families. 27.3% of all households were made up of individuals, and 9.8% had someone living alone who was 65 years of age or older. The average household size was 2.32 and the average family size was 2.83.

The median age in the town was 35.8 years. 21.2% of residents were under the age of 18; 10.9% were between the ages of 18 and 24; 29.8% were from 25 to 44; 27.1% were from 45 to 64; and 10.8% were 65 years of age or older. The gender makeup of the town was 49.7% male and 50.3% female.

=== 2000 census ===
As of the census of 2000, there were 517 people, 205 households, and 152 families living in the town. The population density was 798.6 inhabitants per square mile (307.1/km^{2}). There were 230 housing units at an average density of 355.3 per square mile (136.6/km^{2}). The racial makeup of the town was 100.00% White. Hispanic or Latino of any race were 0.39% of the population.

There were 205 households, out of which 35.6% had children under the age of 18 living with them, 56.1% were married couples living together, 14.1% had a female householder with no husband present, and 25.4% were non-families. 20.5% of all households were made up of individuals, and 8.3% had someone living alone who was 65 years of age or older. The average household size was 2.52 and the average family size was 2.90.

In the town, the population was spread out, with 25.0% under the age of 18, 9.3% from 18 to 24, 30.2% from 25 to 44, 24.4% from 45 to 64, and 11.2% who were 65 years of age or older. The median age was 36 years. For every 100 females, there were 89.4 males. For every 100 females age 18 and over, there were 83.9 males.

The median income for a household in the town was $32,273, and the median income for a family was $34,219. Males had a median income of $28,750 versus $19,688 for females. The per capita income for the town was $14,332. About 15.7% of families and 14.2% of the population were below the poverty line, including 22.3% of those under age 18 and 6.3% of those age 65 or over.

== Notable person ==
- Elizabeth Bonner, winner of the first women's New York City Marathon
