= Albright, West Virginia =

- Town
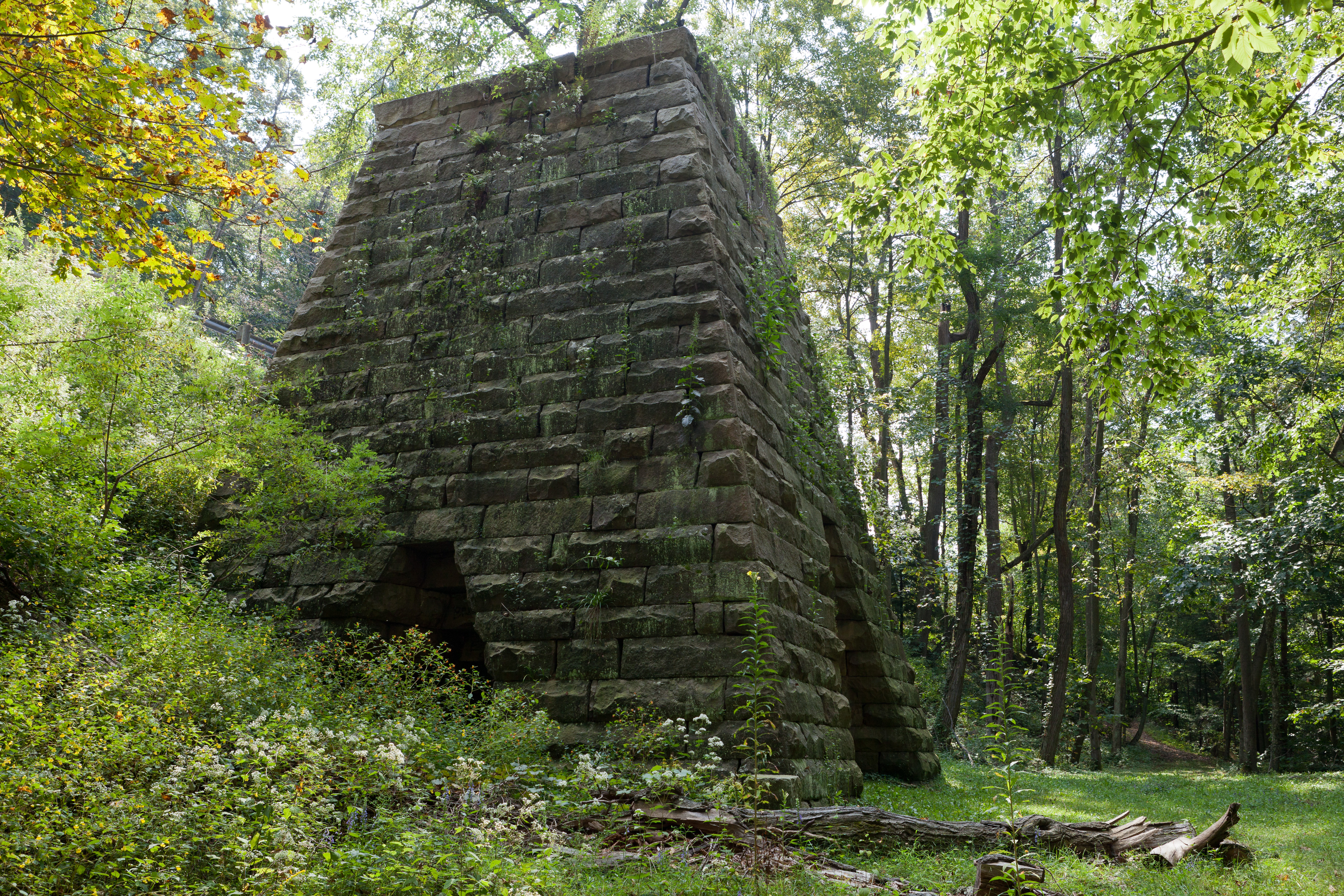
- Virginia Furnace, built in 1854

- Location of Albright in Preston County, West Virginia
- Coordinates: 39°29′37″N 79°38′19″W
- Country: United States
- State: West Virginia
- County: Preston
- Incorporated: 1914

Government
  - Mayor: Brian Snyder

Area
  - Total: 0.27 sq mi (0.71 km^{2})
  - Land: 0.23 sq mi (0.60 km^{2})
  - Water: 0.042 sq mi (0.11 km^{2})
- Elevation: 1,211 ft (369 m)

Population (2020)
  - Total: 249
  - Estimate (2021): 261
  - Density: 1,215.7/sq mi (469.39/km^{2})
- Time zone: UTC-5 (Eastern (EST))
  - Summer (DST): UTC-4 (EDT)
- ZIP code: 26519
- Area code: 304
- FIPS code: 54-00748
- GNIS feature ID: 1553704
- Website: Town website

Albright is a town in central Preston County, West Virginia, United States, along the Cheat River. The population was 260 at the 2020 census. Albright was incorporated in 1914.

== History ==
The town derives its name from David Albright, an early settler. Located near Albright is the Virginia Furnace, listed on the National Register of Historic Places in 1999. The 1985 Election Day floods of the Cheat River wiped out most structures in the town. The Albright Power Station, a former coal-fired power plant retired in 2012, sits across the Cheat River from Albright.

== Geography ==
According to the United States Census Bureau, the town has a total area of 0.27 square miles (0.70 km^{2}), of which 0.23 square miles (0.60 km^{2}) is land and 0.04 square miles (0.10 km^{2}) is water.

=== Climate ===
The climate in this area has mild differences between highs and lows, and there is adequate rainfall year-round. According to the Köppen Climate Classification system, Albright has a humid subtropical climate, abbreviated "Cfa" on climate maps.

== Demographics ==
Historical population
Census	Pop.	Note	%±
1920	262		—
1930	343		30.9%
1940	334		−2.6%
1950	396		18.6%
1960	304		−23.2%
1970	319		4.9%
1980	357		11.9%
1990	195		−45.4%
2000	247		26.7%
2010	299		21.1%
2020	249		−16.7%
2021 (est.)	261	▲	4.8%
U.S. Decennial Census

=== 2010 census ===
At the 2010 census, there were 299 people, 120 households and 79 families living in the town. The population density was 1,300.0 inhabitants per square mile (501.9/km^{2}). There were 128 housing units at an average density of 556.5 per square mile (214.9/km^{2}). The racial makeup of the town was 97.3% White, 0.3% African American, 1.0% Native American, and 1.3% from two or more races.

There were 120 households, of which 30.8% had children under the age of 18 living with them, 48.3% were married couples living together, 10.0% had a female householder with no husband present, 7.5% had a male householder with no wife present, and 34.2% were non-families. 30.8% of all households were made up of individuals, and 11.7% had someone living alone who was 65 years of age or older. The average household size was 2.49 and the average family size was 3.09.

The median age in the town was 38.2 years. 22.4% of residents were under the age of 18; 12.1% were between the ages of 18 and 24; 24.1% were from 25 to 44; 28.4% were from 45 to 64; and 13% were 65 years of age or older. The gender makeup of the town was 47.5% male and 52.5% female.

=== 2000 census ===
At the 2000 census, there were 247 people, 99 households and 61 families living in the town. The population density was 857.9 per square mile (328.9/km^{2}). There were 113 housing units at an average density of 392.5 per square mile (150.4/km^{2}). The racial makeup of the town was 98.79% White, 0.40% African American, and 0.81% from two or more races.

There were 99 households, of which 33.3% had children under the age of 18 living with them, 46.5% were married couples living together, 9.1% had a female householder with no husband present, and 37.4% were non-families. 29.3% of all households were made up of individuals, and 11.1% had someone living alone who was 65 years of age or older. The average household size was 2.49 and the average family size was 3.06.

27.9% of the population were under the age of 18, 6.1% from 18 to 24, 31.2% from 25 to 44, 23.1% from 45 to 64, and 11.7% who were 65 years of age or older. The median age was 34 years. For every 100 females, there were 87.1 males. For every 100 females age 18 and over, there were 83.5 males.

The median household income was $21,389 and the median family income was $21,500. Males had a median income of $20,764 compared with $16,250 for females. The per capita income was $10,581. About 27.9% of families and 26.2% of the population were below the poverty line, including 36.6% of those under the age of eighteen and 27.3% of those 65 or over.

== See also ==
- List of towns in West Virginia
