= Tunnelton, West Virginia =

- Town
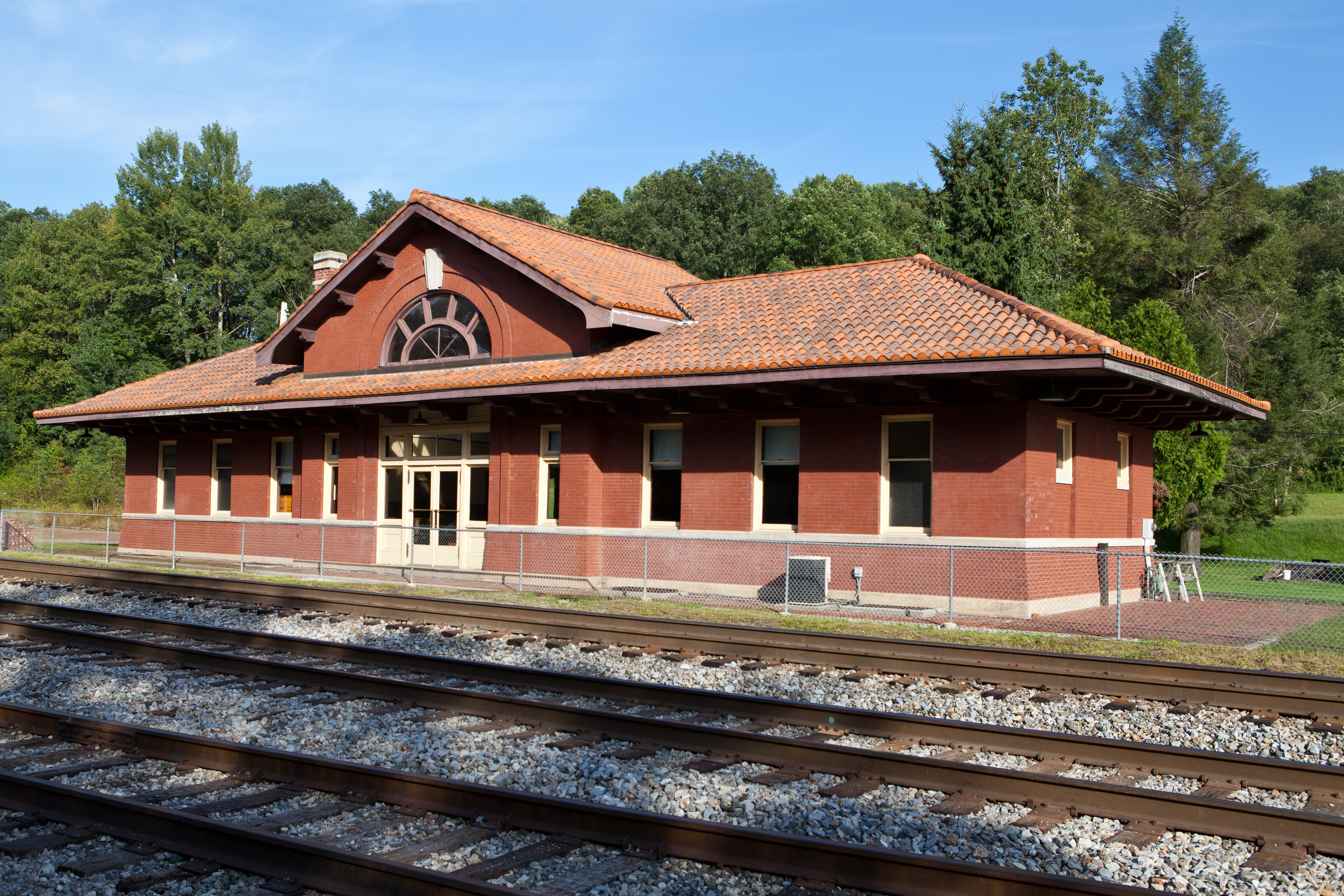
- Tunnelton station

- Location of Tunnelton in Preston County, West Virginia.
- Coordinates: 39°23′42″N 79°44′47″W
- Country: United States
- State: West Virginia
- County: Preston
- Incorporated: 1897

Area
  - Total: 0.34 sq mi (0.87 km^{2})
  - Land: 0.34 sq mi (0.87 km^{2})
  - Water: 0 sq mi (0.00 km^{2})
- Elevation: 1,824 ft (556 m)

Population (2020)
  - Total: 296
  - Estimate (2021): 308
  - Density: 881.0/sq mi (340.17/km^{2})
- Time zone: UTC-5 (Eastern (EST))
  - Summer (DST): UTC-4 (EDT)
- ZIP code: 26444
- Area code: 304
- FIPS code: 54-81268
- GNIS feature ID: 1548320
- Website: local.wv.gov/tunnelton/Pages/default.aspx

Tunnelton is a town in southwestern Preston County, West Virginia, United States. The population was 307 at the 2020 census.

== History ==
Tunnelton took its name after the nearby Kingwood Tunnel. The Tunnelton Railroad Depot was listed on the National Register of Historic Places in 1996.

== Geography ==
Tunnelton is located at 39°23′42″N 79°44′47″W (39.395000, -79.746438).

According to the United States Census Bureau, the town has a total area of 0.34 square miles (0.88 km^{2}), all land.

== Demographics ==
Historical population
| Census | Pop. | Note | %± |
|---|---|---|---|
| 1900 | 479 | | — |
| 1910 | 792 | | 65.3% |
| 1920 | 703 | | −11.2% |
| 1930 | 595 | | −15.4% |
| 1940 | 552 | | −7.2% |
| 1950 | 544 | | −1.4% |
| 1960 | 359 | | −34.0% |
| 1970 | 369 | | 2.8% |
| 1980 | 510 | | 38.2% |
| 1990 | 331 | | −35.1% |
| 2000 | 336 | | 1.5% |
| 2010 | 294 | | −12.5% |
| 2020 | 296 | | 0.7% |
| 2021 (est.) | 308 | ▲ | 4.1% |
U.S. Decennial Census

=== 2010 census ===
At the 2010 census there were 294 people, 110 households, and 74 families living in the town. The population density was 864.7 inhabitants per square mile (333.9/km^{2}). There were 117 housing units at an average density of 344.1 per square mile (132.9/km^{2}). The racial makeup of the town was 99.0% White, 0.3% African American, and 0.7% from two or more races. Hispanic or Latino of any race were 0.7%.

Of the 110 households 37.3% had children under the age of 18 living with them, 50.9% were married couples living together, 12.7% had a female householder with no husband present, 3.6% had a male householder with no wife present, and 32.7% were non-families. 21.8% of households were one person and 11.8% were one person aged 65 or older. The average household size was 2.67 and the average family size was 3.09.

The median age in the town was 38 years. 25.5% of residents were under the age of 18; 7.9% were between the ages of 18 and 24; 28.9% were from 25 to 44; 24.7% were from 45 to 64; and 12.9% were 65 or older. The gender makeup of the town was 48.0% male and 52.0% female.

=== 2000 census ===
At the 2000 census there were 336 people, 130 households, and 86 families living in the town. The population density was 893.5 inhabitants per square mile (341.4/km^{2}). There were 143 housing units at an average density of 380.3 per square mile (145.3/km^{2}). The racial makeup of the town was 100.00% White. Hispanic or Latino of any race were 0.60%.

Of the 130 households 31.5% had children under the age of 18 living with them, 57.7% were married couples living together, 6.2% had a female householder with no husband present, and 33.1% were non-families. 25.4% of households were one person and 14.6% were one person aged 65 or older. The average household size was 2.58 and the average family size was 3.11.

The age distribution was 25.6% under the age of 18, 9.2% from 18 to 24, 30.7% from 25 to 44, 20.5% from 45 to 64, and 14.0% 65 or older. The median age was 35 years. For every 100 females, there were 98.8 males. For every 100 females age 18 and over, there were 88.0 males.

The median household income was $18,125 and the median family income was $19,625. Males had a median income of $19,063 versus $13,000 for females. The per capita income for the town was $7,978. About 27.1% of families and 35.8% of the population were below the poverty line, including 45.0% of those under age 18 and 10.8% of those age 65 or over.

== Notable person ==
- Jay Bonafield, film producer.

== See also ==
- List of towns in West Virginia
