= Rowlesburg, West Virginia =

- Town
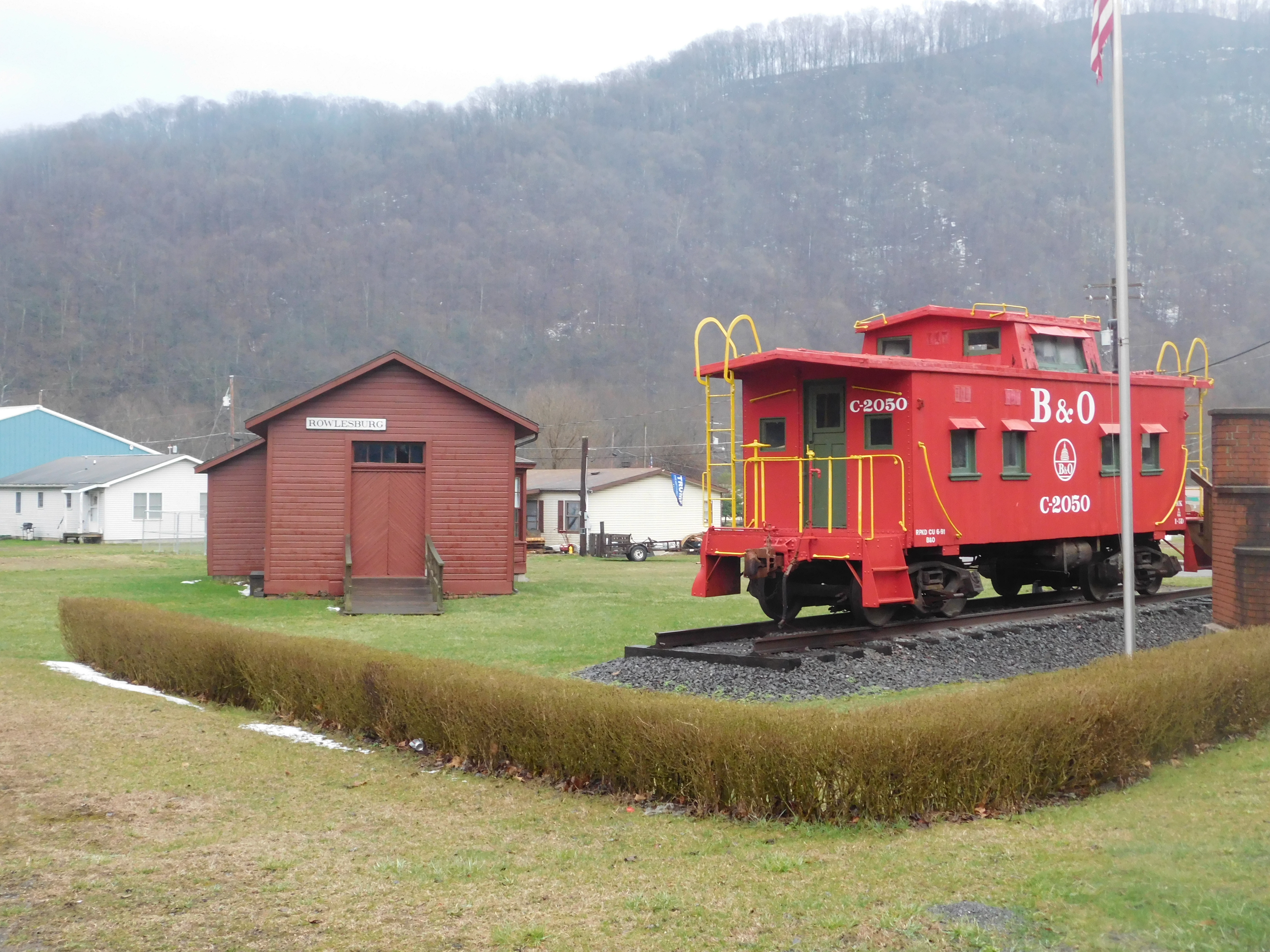
- The former Baltimore and Ohio Railroad and Amtrak station in March 2017

- Logo

- Location of Rowlesburg in Preston County, West Virginia.
- Coordinates: 39°21′0″N 79°40′22″W
- Country: United States
- State: West Virginia
- County: Preston
- Chartered: 1858

Government
  - Mayor: Darrell Dean, Jr.

Area
  - Total: 1.10 sq mi (2.84 km^{2})
  - Land: 1.01 sq mi (2.62 km^{2})
  - Water: 0.085 sq mi (0.22 km^{2})
- Elevation: 1,385 ft (422 m)

Population (2020)
  - Total: 438
  - Density: 566.0/sq mi (218.55/km^{2})
- Time zone: UTC-5 (Eastern (EST))
  - Summer (DST): UTC-4 (EDT)
- ZIP code: 26425
- Area code: 304
- FIPS code: 54-70588
- GNIS feature ID: 1552749
- Website: https://www.townofrowlesburg.com/

Rowlesburg is a town in southern Preston County, West Virginia, United States, along the Cheat River. The population was 438 at the 2020 census. A former railroad town, it is home to the Downtown Rowlesburg Historic District, and was the site of action during the American Civil War.

== History ==
Rowlesburg was incorporated as a town in 1858. It was named for Thomas Rowles, a railroad engineer.

During the American Civil War, its two Baltimore and Ohio Railroad bridges crossing the Cheat River and Tray Run were of great strategic importance. Confederate troops led by General Robert S. Garnett failed to reach Rowlesburg in 1861, but the 1863 Jones–Imboden Raid did reach the town. However, Union troops and townsmen called out of their churches on Sunday morning, April 26, 1863, successfully defended the town and "Lincoln's lifeline," so General William E. Jones retreated and later court-martialed a subordinate.

The Downtown Rowlesburg Historic District was listed on the National Register of Historic Places in 2005.

== Geography ==
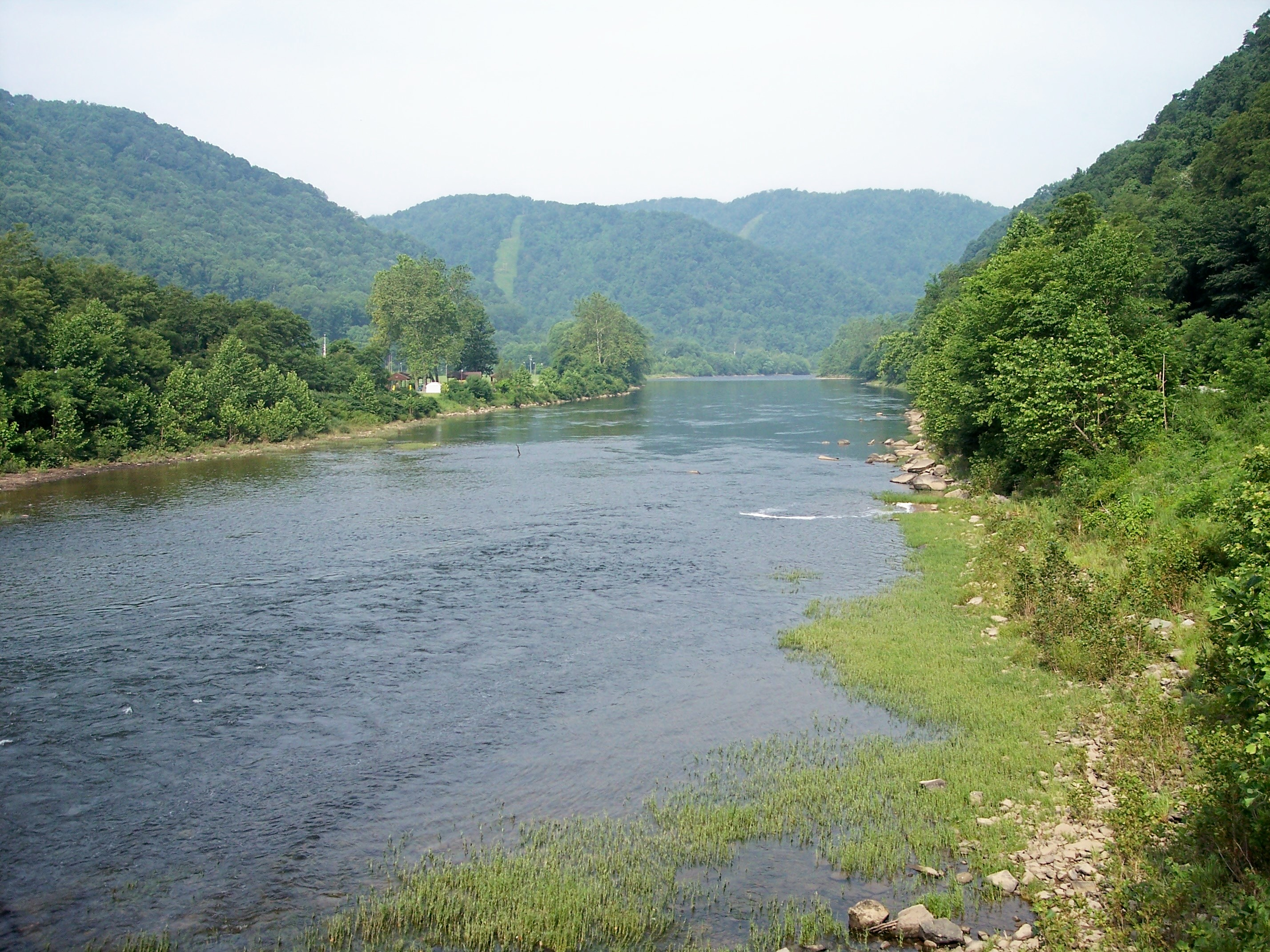
The Cheat River at Rowlesburg

Rowlesburg is located at 39°21′0″N 79°40′22″W (39.350119, -79.672892).

According to the United States Census Bureau, the town has a total area of 1.10 square miles (2.85 km^{2}), of which 1.01 square miles (2.62 km^{2}) is land and 0.09 square miles (0.23 km^{2}) is water.

=== Flood events ===
At Rowlesburg, the Cheat River is considered to be at flood stage when the gauge height is 16 feet.

Date	Gauge Height in feet
July 6, 1844	24.30
July 18, 1888	23.6
October 16, 1954	24.05
November 4, 1985	36.9
February 9, 1994	23.9
May 8, 1994	20.94
January 19, 1996	25.40
May 17, 1996	17.5
July 19, 1996	19.5

=== Climate ===
The climate in this area displays significant differences between summer average high temperatures and winter average lows; adequate precipitation falls year round. In winter months, precipitation is often in the form of snow or sleet. According to the Köppen Climate Classification system, Rowlesburg has a continental climate, abbreviated "Dfb" on climate maps.

Climate data for Rowlesburg, West Virginia (1991–2020 normals, extremes 1942–present)
Month	Jan	Feb	Mar	Apr	May	Jun	Jul	Aug	Sep	Oct	Nov	Dec	Year
Record high °F (°C)	80 (27)	79 (26)	85 (29)	93 (34)	92 (33)	98 (37)	98 (37)	98 (37)	101 (38)	93 (34)	83 (28)	80 (27)	101 (38)
Mean daily maximum °F (°C)	38.3 (3.5)	42.5 (5.8)	51.4 (10.8)	64.2 (17.9)	72.3 (22.4)	79.1 (26.2)	82.2 (27.9)	81.7 (27.6)	76.2 (24.6)	65.0 (18.3)	53.1 (11.7)	42.5 (5.8)	62.4 (16.9)
Daily mean °F (°C)	29.3 (−1.5)	32.4 (0.2)	40.1 (4.5)	50.8 (10.4)	60.2 (15.7)	67.9 (19.9)	71.8 (22.1)	71.0 (21.7)	64.9 (18.3)	53.2 (11.8)	42.1 (5.6)	33.9 (1.1)	51.5 (10.8)
Mean daily minimum °F (°C)	20.2 (−6.6)	22.2 (−5.4)	28.7 (−1.8)	37.4 (3.0)	48.1 (8.9)	56.7 (13.7)	61.3 (16.3)	60.4 (15.8)	53.6 (12.0)	41.4 (5.2)	31.2 (−0.4)	25.3 (−3.7)	40.5 (4.7)
Record low °F (°C)	−21 (−29)	−19 (−28)	−5 (−21)	12 (−11)	22 (−6)	32 (0)	40 (4)	38 (3)	29 (−2)	11 (−12)	0 (−18)	−13 (−25)	−21 (−29)
Average precipitation inches (mm)	4.37 (111)	4.10 (104)	5.00 (127)	4.93 (125)	5.44 (138)	5.49 (139)	6.57 (167)	4.71 (120)	4.37 (111)	3.89 (99)	3.72 (94)	4.67 (119)	57.26 (1,454)
Average snowfall inches (cm)	19.7 (50)	13.3 (34)	10.2 (26)	0.8 (2.0)	0.0 (0.0)	0.0 (0.0)	0.0 (0.0)	0.0 (0.0)	0.0 (0.0)	0.1 (0.25)	2.2 (5.6)	10.6 (27)	56.9 (145)
Average precipitation days (≥ 0.01 in)	18.6	14.7	15.0	13.9	15.0	13.8	13.8	12.0	11.6	11.4	12.8	17.4	170.0
Average snowy days (≥ 0.1 in)	9.0	7.2	3.8	1.0	0.0	0.0	0.0	0.0	0.0	0.1	1.4	7.1	29.6
Source: NOAA

== Demographics ==
Historical population
Census	Pop.	Note	%±
1880	402		—
1890	560		39.3%
1900	652		16.4%
1910	936		43.6%
1920	1,225		30.9%
1930	1,573		28.4%
1940	1,452		−7.7%
1950	1,299		−10.5%
1960	970		−25.3%
1970	829		−14.5%
1980	966		16.5%
1990	648		−32.9%
2000	613		−5.4%
2010	584		−4.7%
2020	438		−25.0%
U.S. Decennial Census

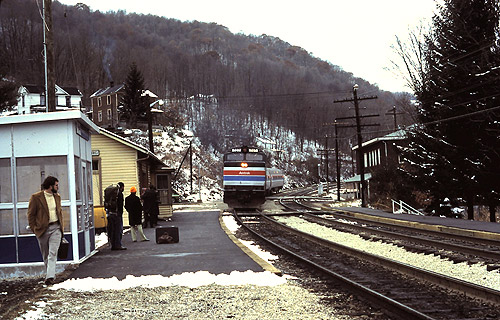
Shenandoah entering Rowlesburg, November 1978

=== 2010 census ===
As of the census of 2010, there were 584 people, 255 households, and 163 families living in the town. The population density was 578.2 inhabitants per square mile (223.2/km^{2}). There were 304 housing units at an average density of 301.0 units per square mile (116.2 units/km^{2}). The racial makeup of the town was 99.5% White, 0.2% from other races, and 0.3% from two or more races.

There were 255 households, of which 23.1% had children under the age of 18 living with them, 51.4% were married couples living together, 8.6% had a female householder with no husband present, 3.9% had a male householder with no wife present, and 36.1% were non-families. 32.9% of all households were made up of individuals, and 19.2% had someone living alone who was 65 years of age or older. The average household size was 2.29 and the average family size was 2.88.

The median age in the town was 48 years. 18.8% of residents were under the age of 18; 5.7% were between the ages of 18 and 24; 20.4% were from 25 to 44; 35.1% were from 45 to 64; and 20% were 65 years of age or older. The gender makeup of the town was 48.3% male and 51.7% female.

=== 2000 census ===
As of the census of 2000, there were 613 people, 260 households, and 164 families living in the town. The population density was 582.0 inhabitants per square mile (224.7 inhabitants/km^{2}). There were 304 housing units at an average density of 288.6 units per square mile (111.4 units/km^{2}). The racial makeup of the town was 98.53% White, 0.16% African American, 0.33% Asian, and 0.98% from two or more races.

There were 260 households, out of which 24.2% had children under the age of 18 living with them, 47.3% were married couples living together, 11.5% had a female householder with no husband present, and 36.9% were non-families. 33.8% of all households were made up of individuals, and 20.4% had someone living alone who was 65 years of age or older. The average household size was 2.36 and the average family size was 2.98.

In the town, the population was spread out, with 21.4% under the age of 18, 8.3% from 18 to 24, 26.9% from 25 to 44, 23.8% from 45 to 64, and 19.6% who were 65 years of age or older. The median age was 42 years. For every 100 females, there were 88.6 males. For every 100 females age 18 and over, there were 82.6 males.

The median income for a household in the town was $28,125, and the median income for a family was $32,813. Males had a median income of $25,962 versus $12,750 for females. The per capita income for the town was $14,663. About 7.6% of families and 12.6% of the population were below the poverty line, including 14.0% of those under age 18 and 10.5% of those age 65 or over.

== Notable people ==
- William G. Brown Sr. (1800–1884), politician and lawyer
- Jock Menefee (1868–1953), baseball pitcher
