= Pisgah, West Virginia =

Pisgah
- Unincorporated community
- Location within the state of West Virginia Pisgah (the United States)
- Coordinates: 39°38′41″N 79°45′24″W
- Country: United States
- State: West Virginia
- County: Preston
- Elevation: 2,077 ft (633 m)
- Time zone: UTC-5 (Eastern (EST))
  - Summer (DST): UTC-4 (EDT)
- GNIS ID: 1544953

Pisgah is an unincorporated community in Preston County, West Virginia, United States.

== History ==
Pisgah started as a small community known as Flat Rock. In 1881, the Pisgah Methodist Church opened in the community and a post office and school came shortly after. Because they also shared the name "Pisgah," the community changed its name as well.
