= Masontown, West Virginia =

- Town
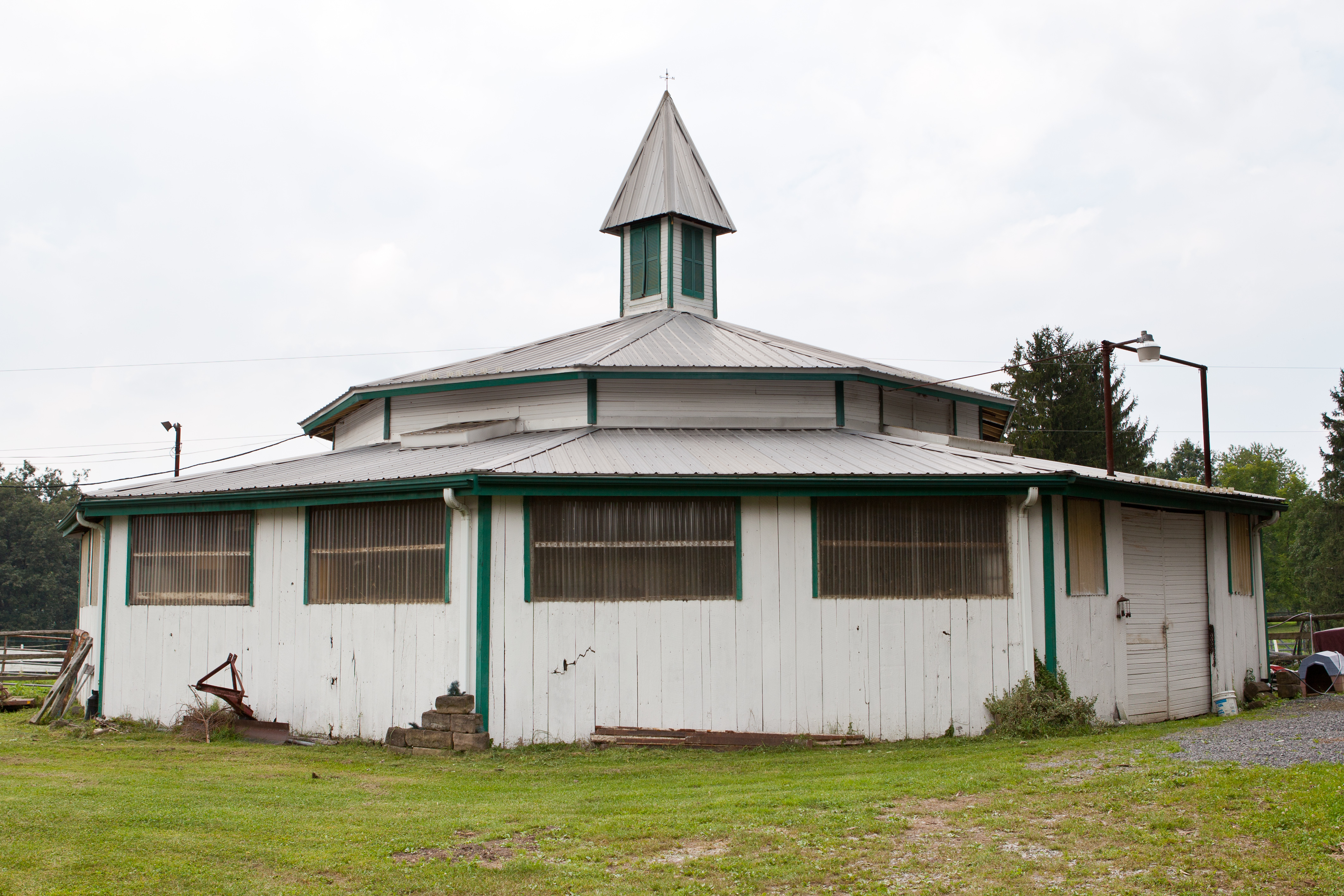
- Ralphsnyder Decagonal Barn

- Location of Masontown in Preston County, West Virginia.
- Coordinates: 39°33′7″N 79°48′1″W
- Country: United States
- State: West Virginia
- County: Preston
- Laid out: 1856
- Incorporated: 1905

Area
  - Total: 0.28 sq mi (0.72 km^{2})
  - Land: 0.28 sq mi (0.72 km^{2})
  - Water: 0 sq mi (0.00 km^{2})
- Elevation: 1,801 ft (549 m)

Population (2020)
  - Total: 510
  - Estimate (2021): 533
  - Density: 1,934.6/sq mi (746.97/km^{2})
- Time zone: UTC-5 (Eastern (EST))
  - Summer (DST): UTC-4 (EDT)
- ZIP code: 26542
- Area code: 304
- FIPS code: 54-52228
- GNIS feature ID: 1555063
- Website: local.wv.gov/masontown/Pages/default.aspx

Masontown is a town in western Preston County, West Virginia, United States. The population was 510 at the 2020 census.

== History ==
Masontown was laid out and platted in 1856. The town was named after William Mason, a pioneer merchant.

Located near Masontown is the Ralphsynder Decagonal Barn, listed on the National Register of Historic Places in 1985.

== Geography ==
Masontown is located at 39°33′7″N 79°48′1″W (39.551821, -79.800156). It also used to host the All Good Music Festival.

According to the United States Census Bureau, the town has a total area of 0.28 square miles (0.73 km^{2}), all land.

== Demographics ==
Historical population
Census	Pop.	Note	%±
1910	520		—
1920	831		59.8%
1930	924		11.2%
1940	869		−6.0%
1950	941		8.3%
1960	841		−10.6%
1970	868		3.2%
1980	1,052		21.2%
1990	737		−29.9%
2000	647		−12.2%
2010	546		−15.6%
2020	510		−6.6%
2021 (est.)	533	▲	4.5%
U.S. Decennial Census

=== 2010 census ===
At the 2010 census there were 546 people, 255 households, and 149 families living in the town. The population density was 1,950.0 inhabitants per square mile (752.9/km^{2}). There were 311 housing units at an average density of 1,110.7 units per square mile (428.8 units/km^{2}). The racial makeup of the town was 98.5% White, 0.5% Pacific Islander, and 0.9% from two or more races. Hispanic or Latino of any race were 0.4%.

Of the 255 households 21.6% had children under the age of 18 living with them, 43.1% were married couples living together, 9.4% had a female householder with no husband present, 5.9% had a male householder with no wife present, and 41.6% were non-families. 34.5% of households were one person and 12.1% were one person aged 65 or older. The average household size was 2.14 and the average family size was 2.70.

The median age in the town was 42.5 years. 17.6% of residents were under the age of 18; 6.2% were between the ages of 18 and 24; 30.3% were from 25 to 44; 27% were from 45 to 64; and 19% were 65 or older. The gender makeup of the town was 48.7% male and 51.3% female.

=== 2000 census ===
At the 2000 census there were 647 people, 280 households, and 180 families living in the town. The population density was 2,299.2 inhabitants per square mile (887.7 inhabitants/km^{2}). There were 339 housing units at an average density of 1,204.7 units per square mile (465.1 units/km^{2}). The racial makeup of the town was 99.07% White, 0.15% African American, and 0.77% from two or more races. Hispanic or Latino of any race were 2.32%.

Of the 280 households 23.6% had children under the age of 18 living with them, 50.7% were married couples living together, 9.6% had a female householder with no husband present, and 35.4% were non-families. 30.7% of households were one person and 18.9% were one person aged 65 or older. The average household size was 2.31 and the average family size was 2.83.

The age distribution was 20.6% under the age of 18, 8.0% from 18 to 24, 27.5% from 25 to 44, 23.2% from 45 to 64, and 20.7% 65 or older. The median age was 42 years. For every 100 females, there were 88.1 males. For every 100 females age 18 and over, there were 91.1 males.

The median household income was $22,750 and the median family income was $29,886. Males had a median income of $24,219 versus $21,250 for females. The per capita income for the town was $12,927. About 17.0% of families and 20.9% of the population were below the poverty line, including 40.2% of those under age 18 and 9.0% of those age 65 or over.

== Education ==
West Preston Middle School is a small middle school located in Masontown, West Virginia, and consists of two main buildings. As of 2012, the school is 95 years old. The current principal is James Hoit. In 2015, a new middle school will be built, as the levy held in 2010 gave permission to go ahead. The school was founded in 1918, by citizens of Masontown selling pies. This school was built as Masontown High School and later consolidated with Arthurdale High School to become Valley High School, and consisted of the main building with three stories. Later, the second building was built. This was at first an elementary school, but later was combined with West Preston School to form one big high school. Later, after the construction of Preston High School, it was made into a middle school.
