= Terra Alta, West Virginia =

- Town
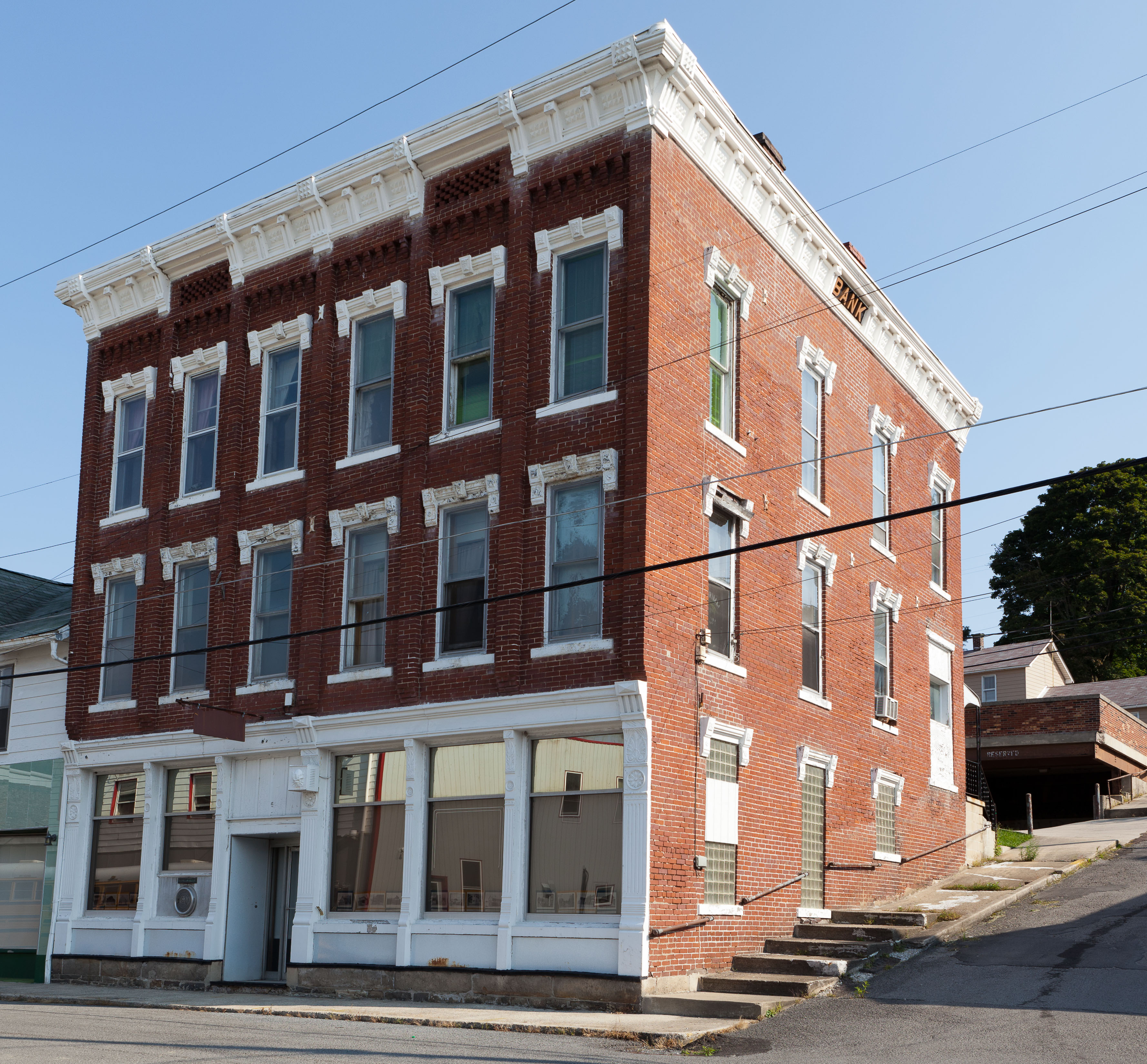
- Terra Alta Bank

- Location of Terra Alta in Preston County, West Virginia.
- Coordinates: 39°26′40″N 79°32′38″W
- Country: United States
- State: West Virginia
- County: Preston
- Chartered: 1860
- Incorporated: 1890

Government
  - Mayor: Josh Dodge

Area
  - Total: 1.19 sq mi (3.07 km^{2})
  - Land: 1.19 sq mi (3.07 km^{2})
  - Water: 0 sq mi (0.00 km^{2})
- Elevation: 2,582 ft (787 m)

Population (2020)
  - Total: 1,415
  - Estimate (2021): 1,498
  - Density: 1,265.6/sq mi (488.64/km^{2})
- Time zone: UTC-5 (Eastern (EST))
  - Summer (DST): UTC-4 (EDT)
- ZIP code: 26764
- Area code: 304
- FIPS code: 54-79708
- GNIS feature ID: 1547983
- Website: https://terraalta.wv.gov/

Terra Alta is a town in eastern Preston County, West Virginia, United States. The population was 1,415 at the 2020 census.

== History ==
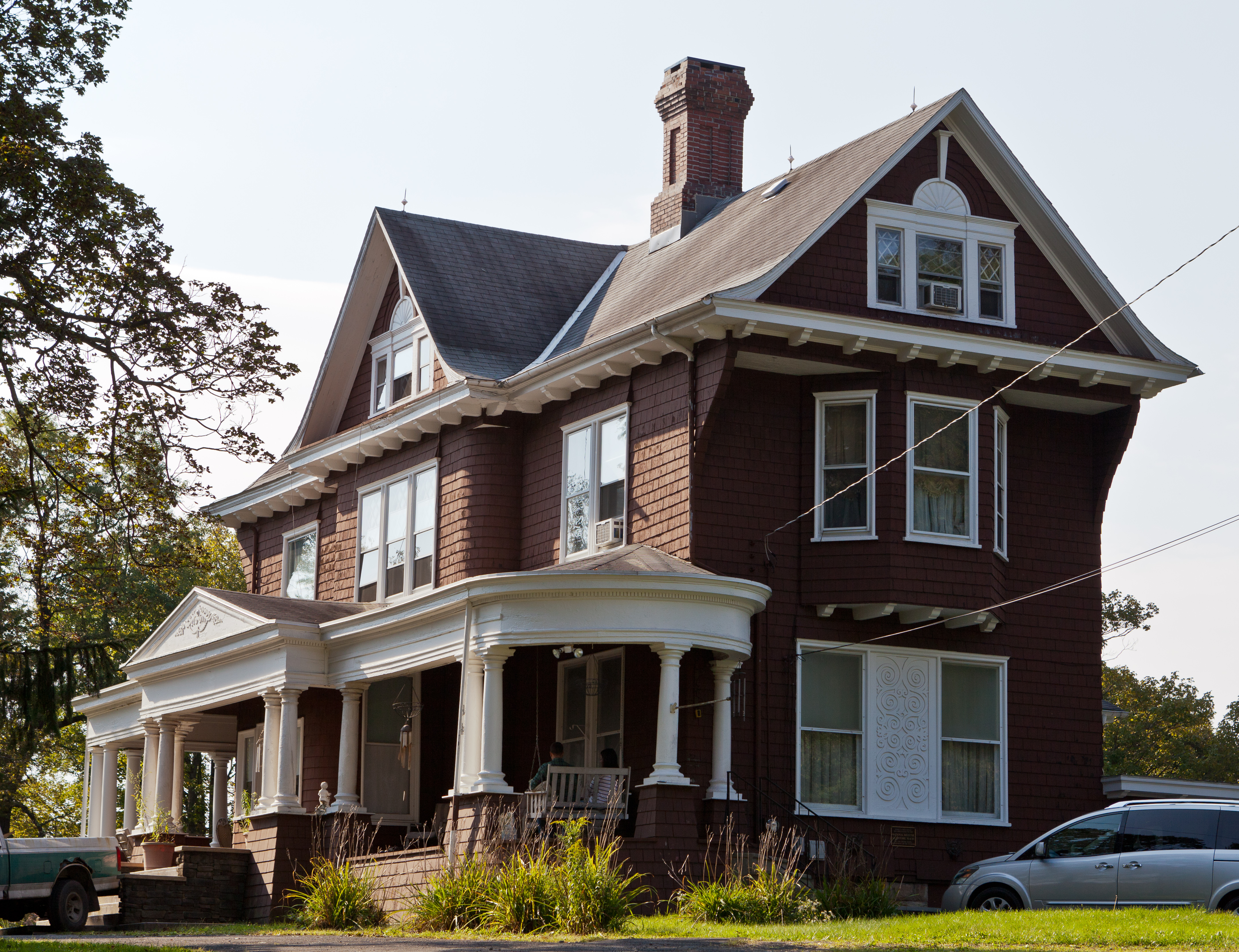
James S. Lakin House

Terra Alta was originally called Portland, and under the latter name had its start in the 1850s. The present name Terra Alta is derived from Latin meaning "high land". According to the 1876 Baltimore and Ohio Railroad map, Terra Alta had a railroad station called Cranberry Station.

The town is home to the James S. Lakin House and Terra Alta Bank, each listed on the National Register of Historic Places. The Terra Alta United Methodist Church was added to the National Register of Historic Places in July 2022. The church was designed by architect John Charles Fulton.

== Geography ==
Terra Alta is located at 39°26′40″N 79°32′38″W (39.444343, -79.544002).

According to the United States Census Bureau, the town has a total area of 1.19 square miles (3.08 km^{2}), all land.

=== Climate ===
The climate in this area has mild differences between highs and lows, and there is adequate rainfall year-round. According to the Köppen Climate Classification system, Terra Alta has a humid continental climate, abbreviated "Dfb" on climate maps.

Climate data for Terra Alta, West Virginia (1991–2020 normals, extremes 1948–2020)
Month	Jan	Feb	Mar	Apr	May	Jun	Jul	Aug	Sep	Oct	Nov	Dec	Year
Record high °F (°C)	72 (22)	74 (23)	81 (27)	88 (31)	89 (32)	91 (33)	95 (35)	94 (34)	93 (34)	84 (29)	78 (26)	74 (23)	95 (35)
Mean maximum °F (°C)	59.0 (15.0)	60.7 (15.9)	69.3 (20.7)	78.4 (25.8)	81.7 (27.6)	83.3 (28.5)	85.2 (29.6)	84.4 (29.1)	82.8 (28.2)	76.8 (24.9)	70.4 (21.3)	60.6 (15.9)	86.3 (30.2)
Mean daily maximum °F (°C)	34.0 (1.1)	37.5 (3.1)	46.2 (7.9)	58.9 (14.9)	66.5 (19.2)	73.2 (22.9)	76.7 (24.8)	75.7 (24.3)	70.2 (21.2)	59.8 (15.4)	48.6 (9.2)	38.5 (3.6)	57.1 (13.9)
Daily mean °F (°C)	25.8 (−3.4)	28.5 (−1.9)	36.2 (2.3)	47.7 (8.7)	56.3 (13.5)	63.5 (17.5)	67.4 (19.7)	66.3 (19.1)	60.5 (15.8)	49.9 (9.9)	39.4 (4.1)	30.6 (−0.8)	47.7 (8.7)
Mean daily minimum °F (°C)	17.7 (−7.9)	19.5 (−6.9)	26.2 (−3.2)	36.5 (2.5)	46.1 (7.8)	53.9 (12.2)	58.1 (14.5)	56.8 (13.8)	50.7 (10.4)	39.9 (4.4)	30.3 (−0.9)	22.7 (−5.2)	38.2 (3.4)
Mean minimum °F (°C)	−1.7 (−18.7)	1.0 (−17.2)	7.6 (−13.6)	21.4 (−5.9)	33.2 (0.7)	42.6 (5.9)	48.6 (9.2)	48.3 (9.1)	38.7 (3.7)	27.3 (−2.6)	15.5 (−9.2)	5.7 (−14.6)	−4.9 (−20.5)
Record low °F (°C)	−31 (−35)	−26 (−32)	−9 (−23)	8 (−13)	17 (−8)	27 (−3)	35 (2)	34 (1)	18 (−8)	8 (−13)	−8 (−22)	−22 (−30)	−31 (−35)
Average precipitation inches (mm)	4.70 (119)	4.28 (109)	5.01 (127)	5.00 (127)	5.36 (136)	5.55 (141)	5.81 (148)	4.85 (123)	4.13 (105)	3.83 (97)	3.85 (98)	4.64 (118)	57.01 (1,448)
Average snowfall inches (cm)	44.1 (112)	36.3 (92)	28.2 (72)	12.1 (31)	0.1 (0.25)	0.0 (0.0)	0.0 (0.0)	0.0 (0.0)	0.0 (0.0)	3.7 (9.4)	15.7 (40)	30.9 (78)	171.1 (435)
Average precipitation days (≥ 0.01 in)	21.5	18.2	17.8	16.6	16.5	14.9	14.0	13.4	11.6	12.5	15.3	19.9	192.2
Average snowy days (≥ 0.1 in)	15.9	13.3	9.8	4.3	0.2	0.0	0.0	0.0	0.0	1.2	5.5	12.2	62.4
Source: NOAA

== Demographics ==
Historical population
Census	Pop.	Note	%±
1890	443		—
1900	616		39.1%
1910	1,126		82.8%
1920	1,261		12.0%
1930	1,474		16.9%
1940	1,471		−0.2%
1950	1,649		12.1%
1960	1,504		−8.8%
1970	1,474		−2.0%
1980	1,946		32.0%
1990	1,713		−12.0%
2000	1,456		−15.0%
2010	1,477		1.4%
2020	1,415		−4.2%
2021 (est.)	1,498	▲	5.9%
U.S. Decennial Census

=== 2010 census ===
As of the census of 2010, there were 1,477 people, 610 households, and 394 families living in the town. The population density was 1,241.2 inhabitants per square mile (479.2/km^{2}). There were 700 housing units at an average density of 588.2 units per square mile (227.1 units/km^{2}). The racial makeup of the town was 98.0% White, 0.7% African American, 0.5% Native American, 0.1% Asian, 0.2% from other races, and 0.5% from two or more races. Hispanic or Latino residents of any race were 0.9% of the population.

There were 610 households, of which 33.0% had children under the age of 18 living with them, 45.1% were married couples living together, 14.6% had a female householder with no husband present, 4.9% had a male householder with no wife present, and 35.4% were non-families. 28.7% of all households were made up of individuals, and 10.6% had someone living alone who was 65 years of age or older. The average household size was 2.41 and the average family size was 2.92.

The median age in the town was 38.8 years. 24.4% of residents were under the age of 18; 8.4% were between the ages of 18 and 24; 26.1% were from 25 to 44; 27.2% were from 45 to 64; and 13.9% were 65 years of age or older. The gender makeup of the town was 47.2% male and 52.8% female.

=== 2000 census ===
As of the census of 2000, there were 1,456 people, 596 households, and 417 families living in the town. The population density was 1,220.1 inhabitants per square mile (471.1 inhabitants/km^{2}). There were 690 housing units at an average density of 578.2 units per square mile (223.2 units/km^{2}). The racial makeup of the town was 99.18% White, 0.14% African American, 0.07% Asian, 0.07% Pacific Islander, 0.07% from other races, and 0.48% from two or more races. Hispanic or Latino residents of any race were 0.34% of the population.

There were 596 households, out of which 32.6% had children under the age of 18 living with them, 53.2% were married couples living together, 12.6% had a female householder with no husband present, and 30.0% were non-families. 26.2% of all households were made up of individuals, and 12.2% had someone living alone who was 65 years of age or older. The average household size was 2.43 and the average family size was 2.90.

In the town, the population was spread out, with 24.5% under the age of 18, 8.2% from 18 to 24, 26.5% from 25 to 44, 26.0% from 45 to 64, and 14.9% who were 65 years of age or older. The median age was 38 years. For every 100 females, there were 88.6 males. For every 100 females age 18 and over, there were 85.2 males.

The median income for a household in the town was $25,388, and the median income for a family was $32,692. Males had a median income of $23,750 versus $17,950 for females. The per capita income for the town was $12,040. About 15.6% of families and 18.9% of the population were below the poverty line, including 31.5% of those under age 18 and 8.9% of those age 65 or over.
