= Bretz, Preston County, West Virginia =

Unincorporated community in West Virginia, United States

Bretz
- Unincorporated community
- Location within the state of West Virginia Bretz (the United States)
- Coordinates: 39°32′32″N 79°48′2″W
- Country: United States
- State: West Virginia
- County: Preston
- Elevation: 1,808 ft (551 m)
- Time zone: UTC-5 (Eastern (EST))
  - Summer (DST): UTC-4 (EDT)
- GNIS ID: 1553973

Bretz is an unincorporated community in Preston County, West Virginia, United States.

The community most likely has the name of a local family.
