= Mountain View, West Virginia =

Mountain View may refer to the following unincorporated communities in West Virginia, United States:

- Mountain View, Logan County, West Virginia
- Mountain View (north), Preston County, West Virginia
- Mountain View (south), Preston County, West Virginia
