= List of National Natural Landmarks in West Virginia =

This is a list of the National Natural Landmarks (NNLs) in West Virginia. There are sixteen in all — five are wetlands (such as bogs and swamps), three are forests, six are limestone caves/karst, and two are rock formations. All are located entirely within West Virginia with the exception of the Cranesville Swamp Nature Sanctuary, which lies mostly within Garrett County, Maryland but also extends into Preston County, West Virginia. Eleven of the sixteen NNLs are within the boundaries of the Monongahela National Forest, although this does not necessarily mean they are on public land.

West Virginia National Natural Landmarks (clickable map)

Name	Image	Date	Location	County	Ownership	Description
Bear Rocks and Allegheny Front Preserve		2021		Grant, Tucker	Private	The best example of a plateau within the Appalachian Plateaus Province. Supports a diverse and distinct ecological community. Located within the Monongahela National Forest and operated by The Nature Conservancy.
Big Run Bog		1974		Tucker	Federal	Located within the Monongahela National Forest, contains a high-altitude northern spruce bog.
Blister Run Swamp		1974		Pocahontas	Federal	A high-altitude balsam fir swamp located in Monongahela National Forest.
Canaan Valley		1974	39.126667°N 79.378056°W	Tucker	Federal	Protects a boreal forest. Located in Canaan Valley National Wildlife Refuge.
Cathedral State Park		1965	39.326667°N 79.538056°W	Preston	State	Features a cool, dense hemlock forest.
Cranberry Glades Botanical Area		1974	38.203056°N 80.266389°W	Pocahontas	Federal	A bog forest, shrub thicket, and open glade in Monongahela National Forest.
Cranesville Swamp Nature Sanctuary	Cranesville Swamp	1964	39.531389°N 79.481944°W	Preston	Private	A natural bowl where cool, moist conditions yield plant and animal communities more common in northern latitudes. Extends into, and primarily located in, Garrett County, Maryland. Operated by The Nature Conservancy.
Fisher Spring Run Bog		1974		Grant	Federal	Contains a spruce bog. Located in Monongahela National Forest.
Gaudineer Scenic Area		1974	38.628056°N 79.8425°W	Randolph, Pocahontas	Federal	A virgin red spruce forest in Monongahela National Forest.
Germany Valley Karst Area		1973	38.765°N 79.39°W	Pendleton	Mixed - federal, private	A unique intermountain karst area.
Greenville Saltpeter Cave		1973		Monroe	Private	Protects the largest saltpeter cave in the state.
Ice Mountain		2012	39.363333°N 78.466944°W	Hampshire	Private	Supports a rich collection of boreal vascular plants. Operated by The Nature Conservancy.
Lost World Caverns		1973	37.8326°N 80.4469°W	Greenbrier	Private	Cave contains pedestal-like stalagmites.
Organ Cave System		1973	37.718056°N 80.436944°W	Greenbrier	Private	Largest cave in West Virginia.
Shavers Mountain Spruce-Hemlock Stand		1974		Randolph	Federal	An old-growth stand of red spruce and hemlock trees. Part of Monongahela National Forest.
Sinnett-Thorn Mountain Cave System		1973		Pendleton	Private	Cave system with waterfalls and deep pits.

== De-designation ==
According to a notice in the Federal Register in July 2006, Swago Karst Area in Pocahontas County was removed by the Department of the Interior from NNL designation in response to owner requests. It was originally designated in November 1973. Its description formerly read: "A classic illustration of features associated with karst topography and terrain, including caverns and other passages."

== See also ==
- List of National Natural Landmarks
- List of National Historic Landmarks in West Virginia
- National Register of Historic Places listings in West Virginia
