= Borgman =

Borgman or Borgmann is an Anglo-Saxon and Frisian surname of Dutch, English, German (Germanic) name. It used to be the name given for landlords who worked for kings, royal aristocracy in the Middle Ages. They collected payments, therefore the Dutch name 'borg', to take toll/to take money, and 'man', the person who takes it. In this case this was the landlord. Parts includes Lower Saxony, Groningen, Gelderland, Overijssel, Drenthe, Friesland, Frisia and East Frisia and England.

The name comes from the ancient medieval place Duchy of Saxony, where the name spread in the early Middle Ages. The area was part of the Carolingian stem duchy tribes covering the greater part of Northern Germany, Netherlands and England. Some tribes eventually immigrated to England at the Early Middle Ages. It is also part of the Anglo surnames in English; many had an aristocratic origin inter mixed married with Germanic and English Royal houses in the Middle Ages when there were English rulers in mainland Europe. One of the famous ones is the house of Welf, a European dynasty that has included many German, Dutch and British monarchs. These names are common in the Netherlands, Germany and England. The Netherlands did not exist until the late 16th century, so the surname has a bigger origin from a different and bigger dynasties. The backgrounds of these surnames are mostly explained in historical books. An extraction of the name 'Borg' is also often found in Sweden and Denmark.

Many Jewish families and Orthodox Jewish have the name Borgman, בורגמאן, because they married with families with the Borgman surname. Mostly from Germany, Poland, Ukraine, Koningsberg.

Notable people with this name include:

- André Borgman, Dutch drummer
- Andreas Borgman, (born 1995), Swedish ice hockey player
- Christine L. Borgman, American university professor
- Danielle Borgman (born 1980), American soccer player
- Erik Borgman (born 1957), Dutch religious author
- Jan Borgman (1929–2021), Dutch astronomer
- Jim Borgman (born 1954), American cartoonist
- Maja-Lisa Borgman (c. 1757–1791), Swedish coffee house owner
- Paul C. Borgman (born 1940), American religious author

== See also ==
- Borgmann
