= Triple Fork =

Thiple Fork may refer to:

- Triple Fork Drainage District, a drainage district in Champaign County, Illinois, U.S.
- Triple Fork Mine, a former gold mine in Louisa County, Virginia, U.S.
- Triple Fork (sanchakou), a traditional Chinese opera whose story forms part of the Generals of the Yang Family saga

== See also ==
- Three Forks (disambiguation)
- Sanchakou (disambiguation)
