= Horseshoe Run (disambiguation) =

Horseshoe run was a shipping route in Australia.

Horeshoe Run may also refer to:

- Horse Shoe Run, West Virginia, an unincorporated community
- Horseshoe Run (Cheat River), a stream in West Virginia

== See also ==
- Horseshoe route, a World War II flying boat route
