= Mountain View (north), Preston County, West Virginia =

Mountain View, West Virginia
- Unincorporated community
- Location within West Virginia Location within the United States
- Coordinates: 39°25′53″N 79°45′39″W
- Country: United States
- State: West Virginia
- County: Preston
- Elevation: 2,218 ft (676 m)
- Time zone: UTC-5 (Eastern (EST))
  - Summer (DST): UTC-4 (EDT)
- Area codes: 304 & 681
- GNIS feature ID: 1560108

Mountain View is an unincorporated community in Preston County, West Virginia, United States. Mountain View is located on West Virginia Route 26, 5 miles (8.0 km) west-southwest of Kingwood.
