= Colebank =

Colebank may refer to:

- Colebank, West Virginia, an unincorporated community in West Virginia, United States
- Jasper Colebank (1887–1968), American football player and coach
