= Gaymont =

Historic house in West Virginia, United States

- U.S. National Register of Historic Places
- U.S. Historic district – Contributing property
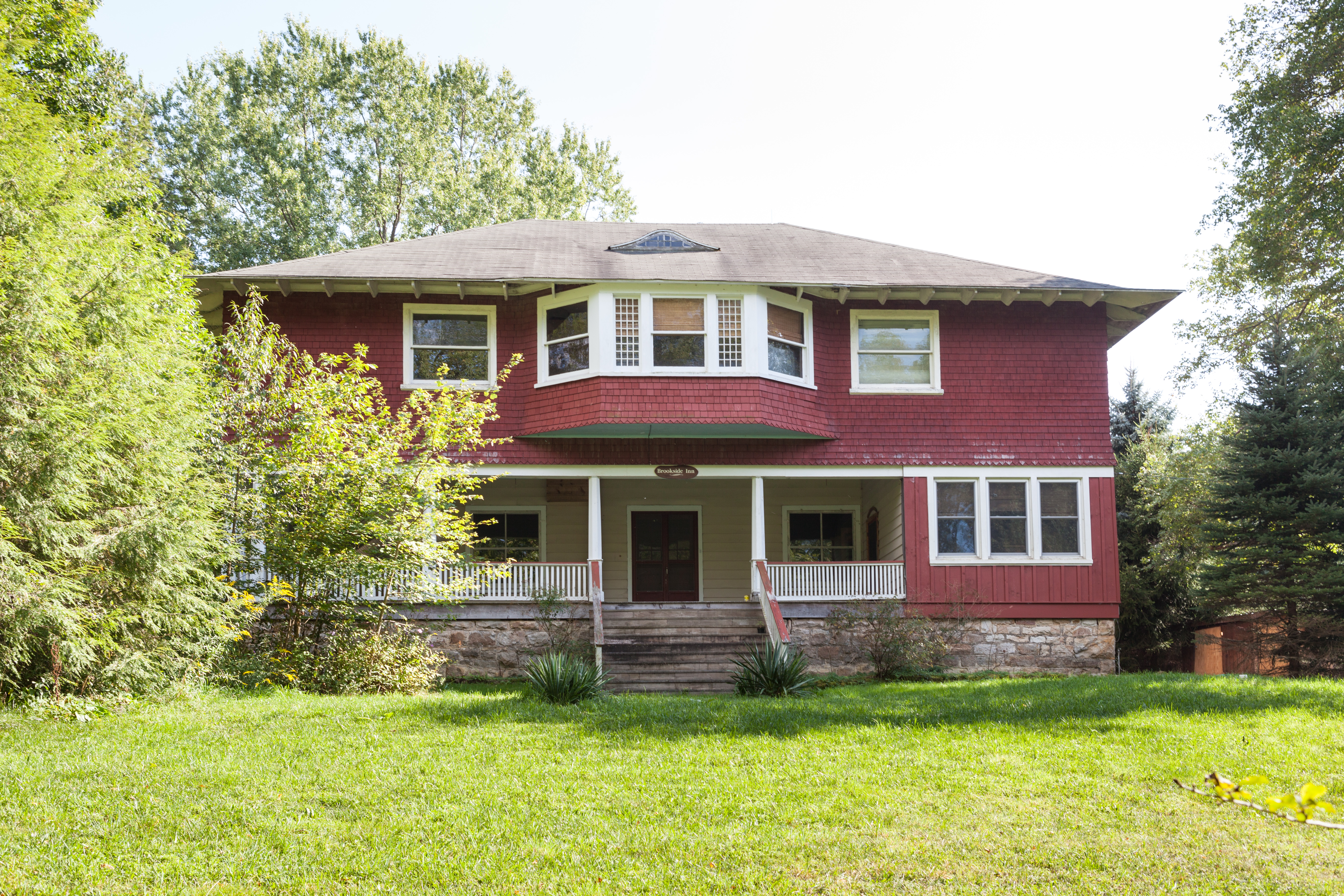
- North facade in 2015

- Location within West Virginia Location within the United States
- Location: U.S. Route 50 west of junction with WV 24, near Aurora, West Virginia
- Coordinates: 39°19′31″N 79°32′8″W
- Area: 1.3 acres (0.53 ha)
- Built: c. 1896
- Architectural style: Bungalow/craftsman, Queen Anne, Rustic
- Part of: Brookside Historic District (ID13000264)
- NRHP reference No.: 92000351

Significant dates
- Added to NRHP: April 14, 1992
- Designated CP: May 8, 2013

Gaymont is a historic home located near Aurora, Preston County, West Virginia. It was built about 1896 as a summer resort cottage. It is a two-story, T-shaped dwelling constructed of wood, wood shingles, wood half-timbers, and cut stone. It displays eclectic overtones of American Craftsman, Rustic, and Queen Anne architectural styles. It features a low-pitched, cross-gabled, and hipped roof and wraparound, Queen Anne style verandah.

It was listed on the National Register of Historic Places in 1992. It is located in the Brookside Historic District.
