= Red Horse Tavern =

Historic tavern in West Virginia, United States

- U.S. National Register of Historic Places
- U.S. Historic district – Contributing property
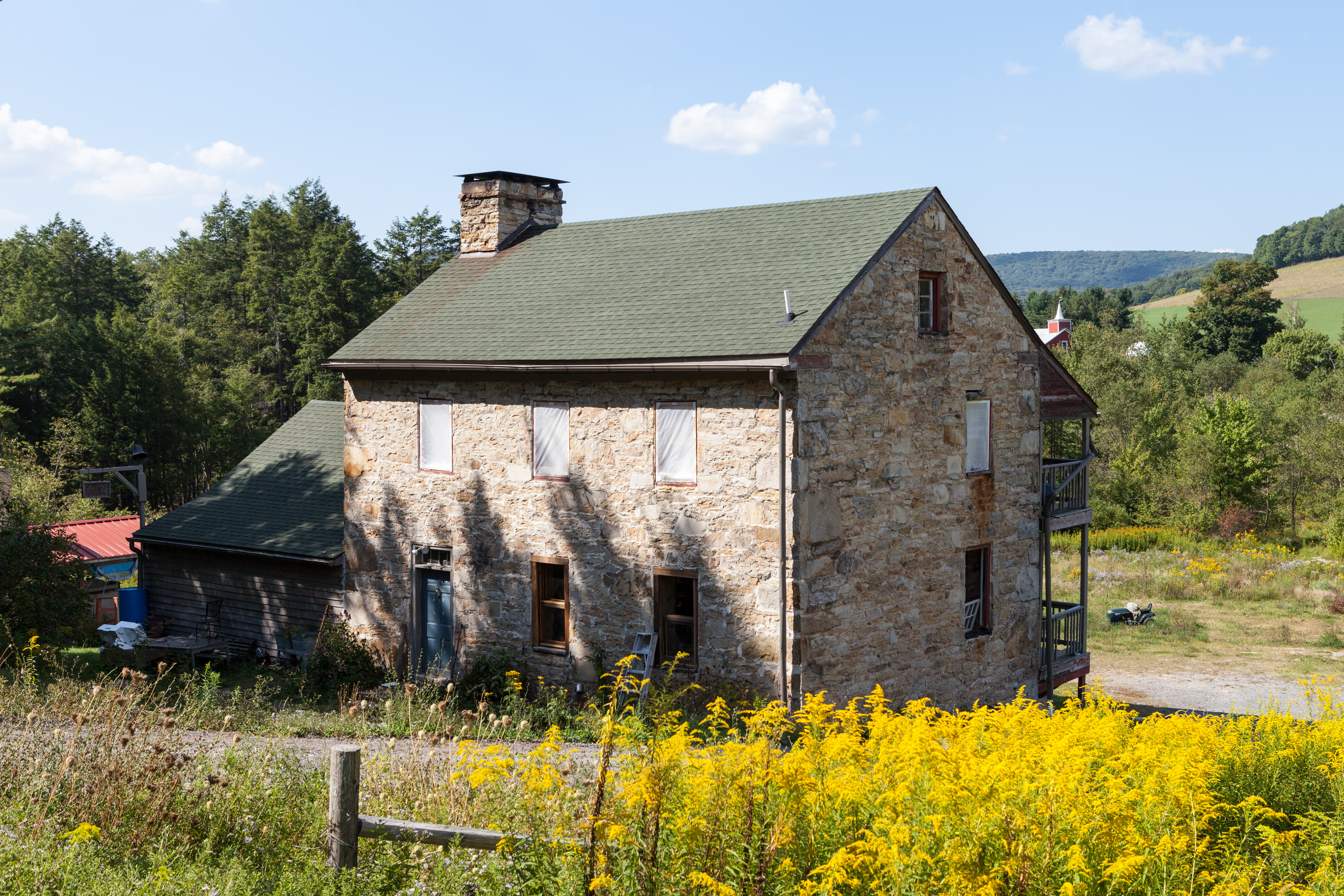
- Front, facing U.S. Route 50, in 2015

- Location within West Virginia Location within the United States
- Location: 1 mile east of Aurora on U.S. Route 50, near Aurora, West Virginia
- Coordinates: 39.32645°N 79.5317°W
- Area: 5.3 acres (2.1 ha)
- Built: 1825-1827
- Architect: Grimes, Henry
- Part of: Brookside Historic District (ID13000264)
- NRHP reference No.: 73001923, 79003443

Significant dates
- Added to NRHP: July 2, 1973, boundary increase May 4, 1979
- Designated CP: May 8, 2013

Red Horse Tavern, also known as Brookside Inn and The Old Stone House, is a historic inn and tavern located near Aurora, Preston County, West Virginia. It was built between 1825 and 1827, as a dwelling. In 1841, it opened as a public inn to serve travelers on the Northwestern Turnpike. It is built of rubble stone, and has one large downstairs room and three upstairs rooms with an attic above them.

It was listed on the National Register of Historic Places in 1973, with a boundary increase in 1979. It is located in the Brookside Historic District.
