= Victoria West (disambiguation) =

Victoria West may refer to any of the following geographical locations:

- Victoria West, a town in South Africa
- Victoria West, Greater Victoria, a suburb of Victoria, British Columbia, Canada
- Victoria, West Virginia, an unincorporated community in the United States
- Victoria West (provincial electoral district), defunct electoral district (1886-1919) in Ontario, Canada
