= Cathedral State Park =

State park in Preston County, West Virginia

- IUCN category III (natural monument or feature)
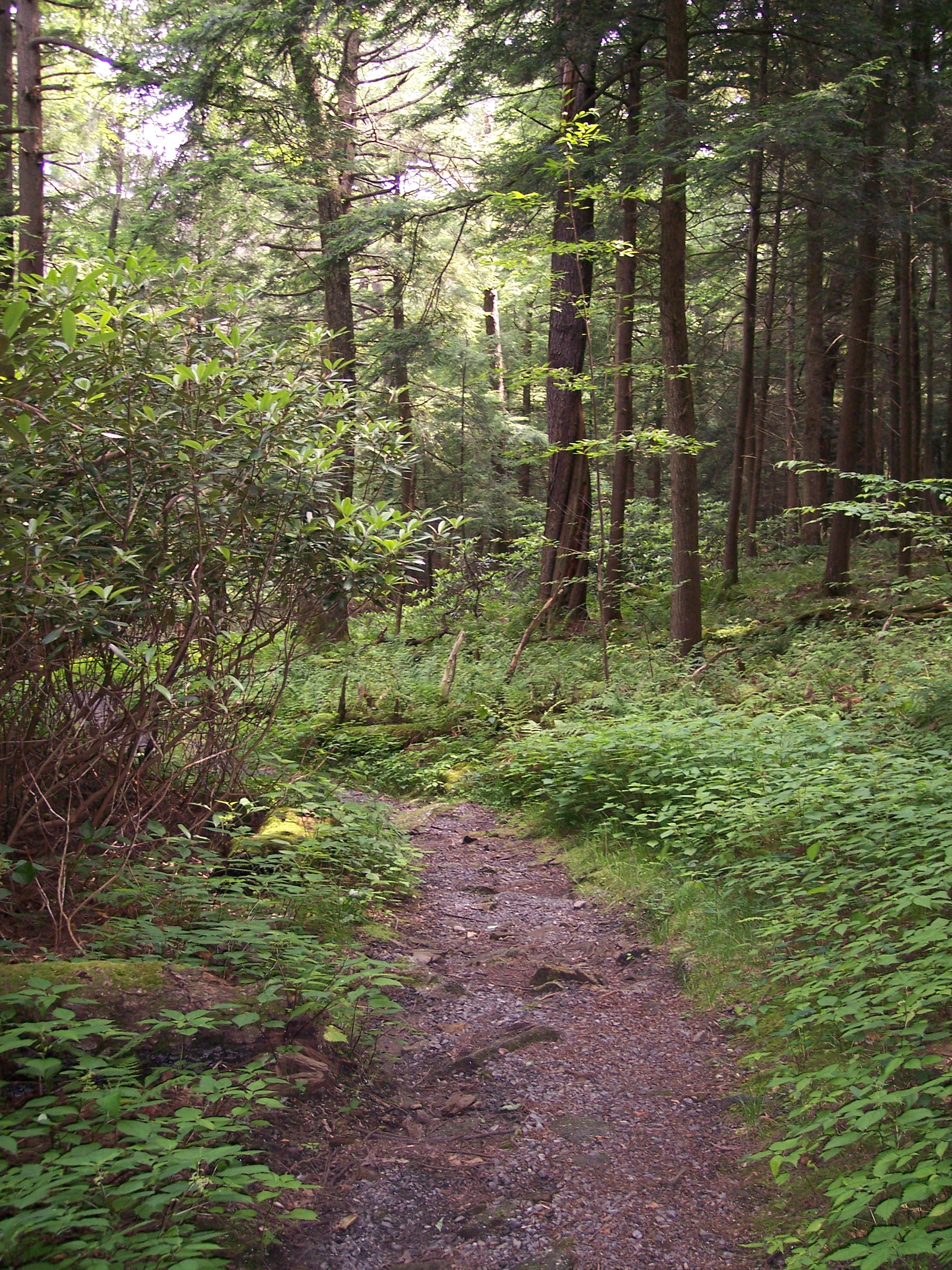
- Cathedral Trail

- Location within West Virginia
- Location: Preston, West Virginia, United States
- Coordinates: 39°19′36″N 79°32′17″W
- Area: 132 acres (53 ha)
- Elevation: 2,579 ft (786 m)
- Established: 1942
- Governing body: West Virginia Division of Natural Resources
- Website: wvstateparks.com/park/cathedral-state-park/

Cathedral State Park is the largest virgin timber tract remaining in West Virginia. The park features trees of up to 90 feet in height and 16 feet in circumference. Located on 132 acres (53 ha) about one mile (1.6 km) east of the town of Aurora and five miles west of Redhouse, Maryland, Cathedral is a mixed forest of predominantly eastern hemlock. Rhine Creek runs through the park.

The National Park Service has designated the park as a National Natural Landmark in 1965.

The park is under significant threat from the hemlock woolly adelgid, which has been detected within 20 miles (32 km) of the park.

== History ==
Mr Branson Haas, a workman for the Brookside hotel, purchased the land in 1922 and sold it to the state of West Virginia in 1942. It was included in the Brookside Historic District. The park was entered in the National Registry for Natural History Landmarks on October 6, 1966. The Society of American Foresters recognized the park in 1983 in its National Natural Areas program.

In 2004, the state's largest hemlock tree was felled by lightning.

In October 2012, the park suffered extensive damage resulting from snowfall produced by Hurricane Sandy.

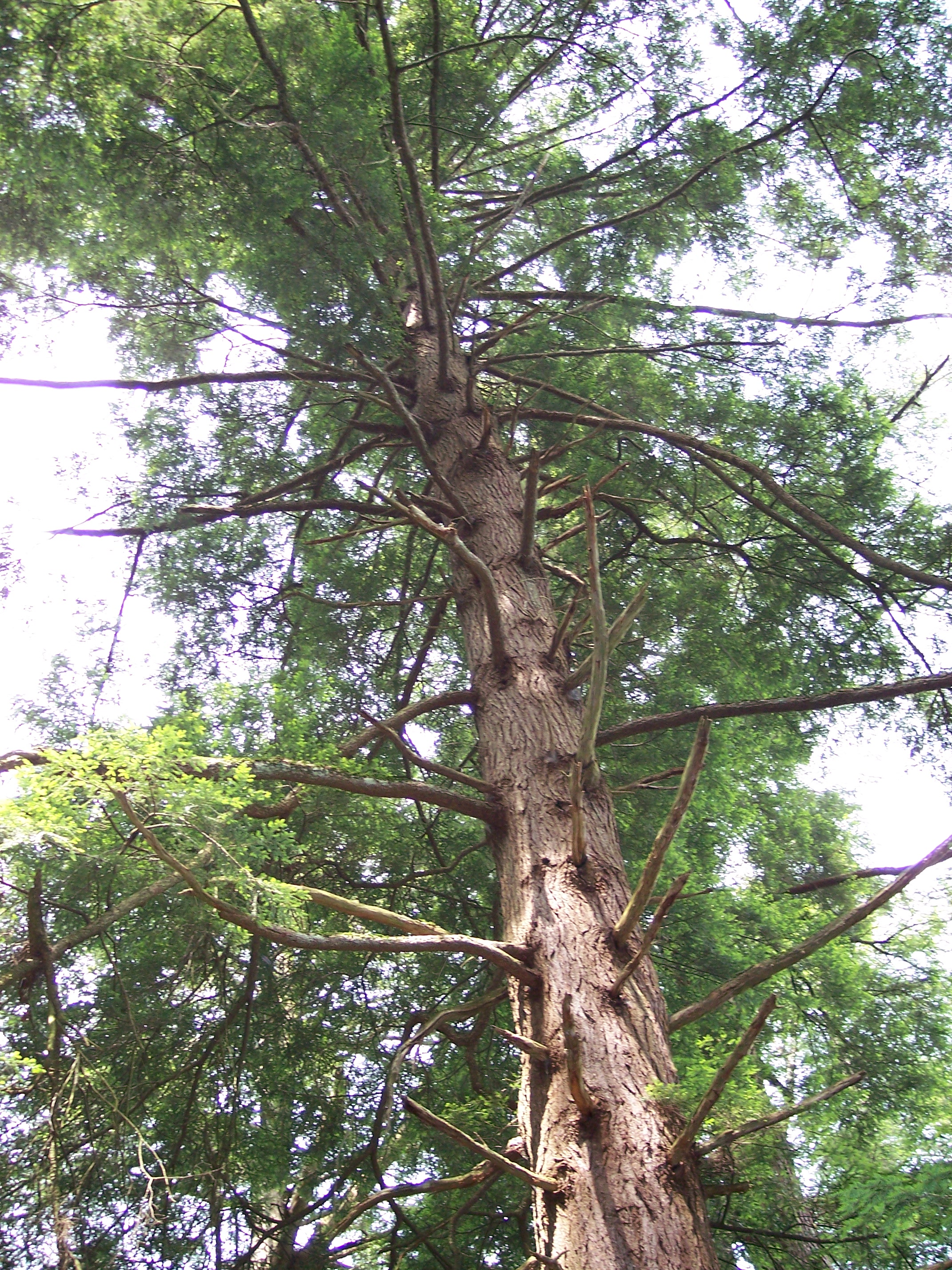
An Eastern Hemlock in Cathedral State Park

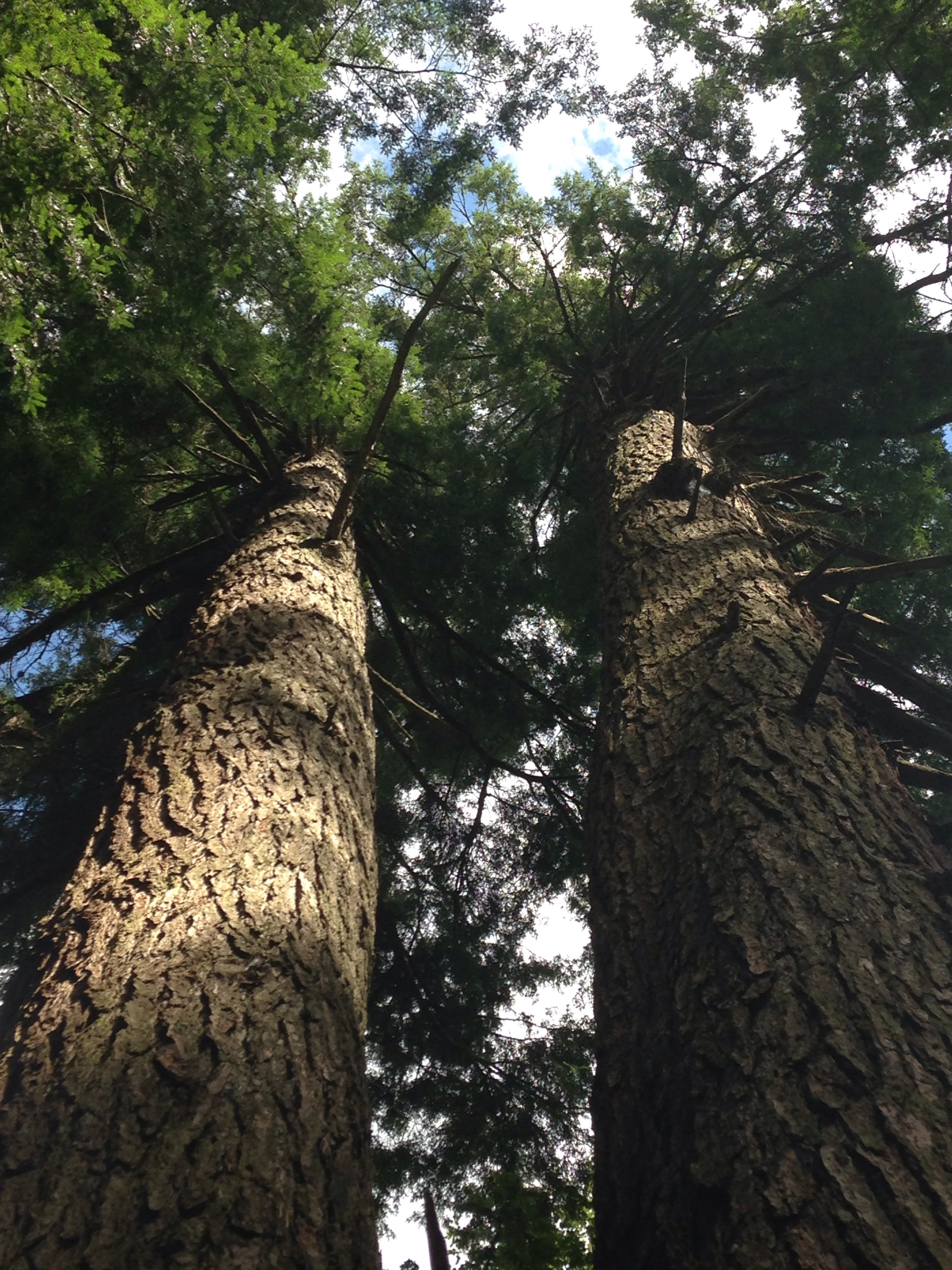
Hemlock in Cathedral State Park

== Trails ==
| Trail Name | Trail Length | |
| Trail Name | ft | m |
|---|---|---|
| Cathedral Trail | 5,898 | 1,798 |
| Giant Hemlock Trail | 1,170 | 360 |
| Partridge Berry Trail | 2,931 | 893 |
| Trillium Trail | 668 | 204 |
| Cardinal Trail | 1,201 | 366 |
| Wood Thrush Trail | 3,274 | 998 |
| Old Oakland Road | 2,257 | 688 |

== See also ==
- List of West Virginia state parks
- State park
- List of old growth forests
- List of National Natural Landmarks
- List of National Natural Landmarks in West Virginia
