= Hiorra, West Virginia =

- Unincorporated community
- Location within West Virginia Location within the United States
- Coordinates: 39°23′32″N 79°49′07″W
- Country: United States
- State: West Virginia
- County: Preston
- Elevation: 1,352 ft (412 m)
- Time zone: UTC-5 (Eastern (EST))
  - Summer (DST): UTC-4 (EDT)
- Area codes: 304 & 681
- GNIS feature ID: 1554721

Hiorra is an unincorporated community in Preston County, in the U.S. state of West Virginia.

== History ==
A post office called Hiorra was established in 1902, and remained in operation until 1918. The community's name is an amalgamation of the names of three businessmen in the local mining industry.
