= Scotch Hill =

Scotch Hill may refer to:

- Scotch Hill, Pennsylvania, a community in Clarion County, Pennsylvania
- Scotch Hill, West Virginia, an unincorporated community in Preston County
