= Brookside Historic District (Aurora, West Virginia) =

Historic district in West Virginia, United States

- U.S. National Register of Historic Places
- U.S. Historic district
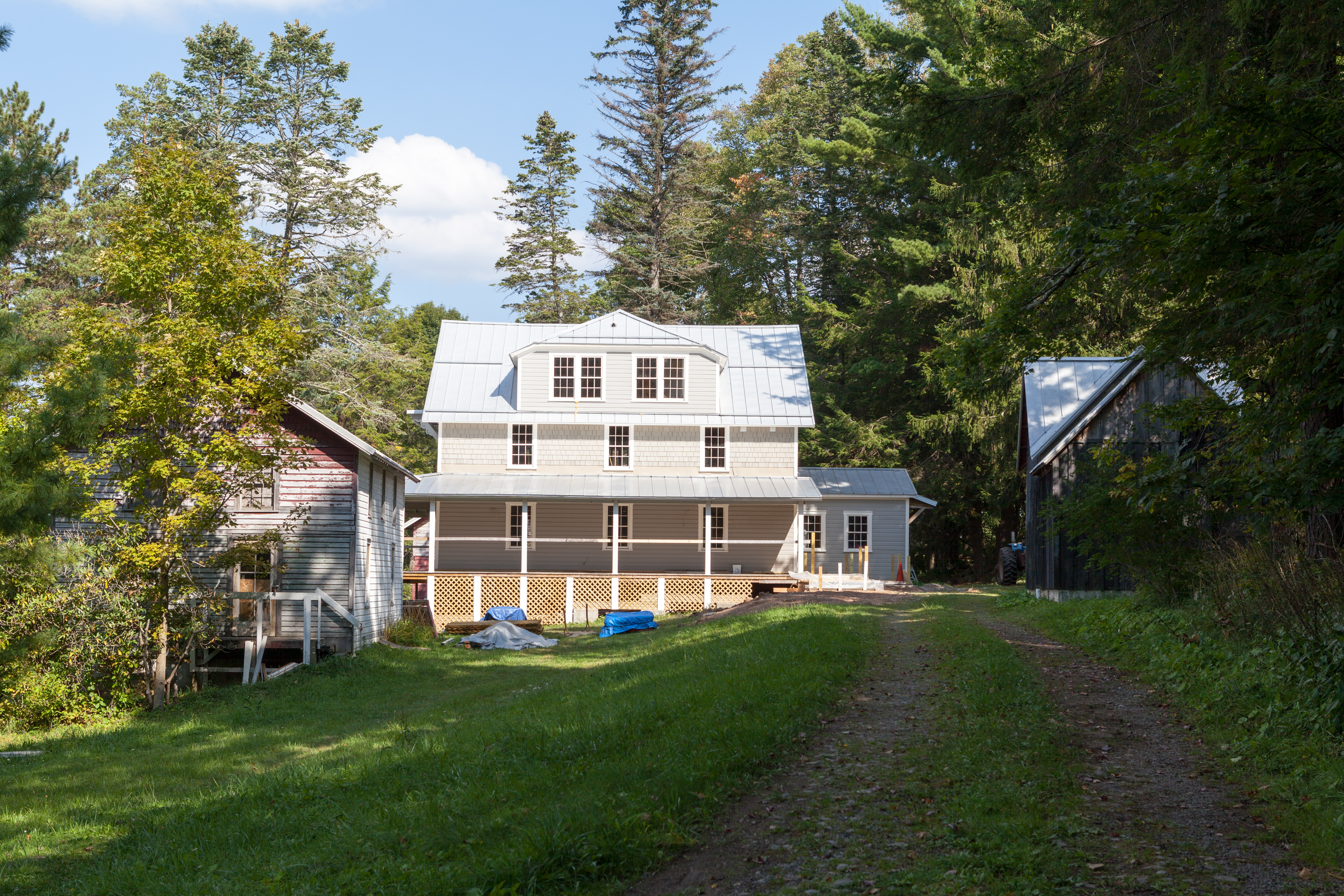
- Sycamore, Keystone, and Carbide cottages

- Location within West Virginia Location within the United States
- Location: George Washington Hwy. near Cathedral State Park, Aurora, West Virginia
- Coordinates: 39°19′33″N 79°32′06″W
- Area: 139 acres (56 ha)
- Built: 1825
- Architectural style: Craftsman, Shingle Style, I-house
- NRHP reference No.: 13000264
- Added to NRHP: May 8, 2013

Brookside Historic District is a national historic district located at Aurora, Preston County, West Virginia. It encompasses 11 contributing buildings, 1 contributing structure, and 1 contributing site in the small community of Aurora. There are five properties included: Brookside Inn/Gaymont (c. 1895), the Brookside Cottages (c. 1885), Cathedral State Park, Brookside Farm (c. 1895-1905), and the Red Horse Tavern (1825). The community was an important example of a turn-of-the-20th century rural retreat with farm. Owners of the resort took advantage of its location close to the Baltimore and Ohio Railroad and created a respite from the city heat for residents of Washington, Baltimore, Cleveland and other cities.

It was listed on the National Register of Historic Places in 2013.
