= Stevensburg =

Stevensburg may refer to:

- Stevensburg, Virginia, a rural unincorporated community in Culpeper County
- Stevensburg, West Virginia, an unincorporated community in Preston County
