= Borgman (disambiguation) =

Borgman is a surname.

Borgman may also refer to:

- Borgman, West Virginia
- Borgman (film), a 2013 Dutch film
- Sonic Soldier Borgman, a 1988 anime series
