= Guseman, West Virginia =

Unincorporated community in West Virginia, US

Coordinates: 39°30′59″N 79°48′32″W

Guseman is an unincorporated community in Preston County, in the U.S. state of West Virginia.

== History ==
A post office called Guseman was established in 1883, and remained in operation until 1909. The community has the name of Jacob Guseman, an early settler.
