= Denver, West Virginia =

Unincorporated community in West Virginia, US

Denver
- Unincorporated community
- Location within the state of West Virginia Denver (the United States)
- Coordinates: 39°22′56″N 79°46′13″W
- Country: United States
- State: West Virginia
- County: Preston
- Elevation: 2,024 ft (617 m)
- Time zone: UTC-5 (Eastern (EST))
  - Summer (DST): UTC-4 (EDT)
- GNIS feature ID: 1554292

Denver is an unincorporated community in Preston County, West Virginia, United States. South Preston School is located along West Virginia Route 26 in Denver.
