= Amboy, West Virginia =

Unincorporated community in West Virginia, United States

Amboy
- Unincorporated community
- Location within the state of West Virginia Amboy (the United States)
- Coordinates: 39°20′54″N 79°34′6″W
- Country: United States
- State: West Virginia
- County: Preston
- Elevation: 2,549 ft (777 m)
- Time zone: UTC-5 (Eastern (EST))
  - Summer (DST): UTC-4 (EDT)
- GNIS feature ID: 1553724

Amboy is an unincorporated community in Preston County, West Virginia, United States.
