= Ruthbelle, West Virginia =

Ruthbelle
- Unincorporated community
- Location within the state of West Virginia Ruthbelle (the United States)
- Coordinates: 39°30′27″N 79°38′35″W
- Country: United States
- State: West Virginia
- County: Preston
- Elevation: 1,217 ft (371 m)
- Time zone: UTC-5 (Eastern (EST))
  - Summer (DST): UTC-4 (EDT)
- GNIS ID: 1555545

Ruthbelle is an unincorporated community in Preston County, West Virginia, United States.
