= Zevely, West Virginia =

Zevely
- Unincorporated community
- Location within the state of West Virginia Zevely (the United States)
- Coordinates: 39°29′15″N 79°40′30″W
- Country: United States
- State: West Virginia
- County: Preston
- Elevation: 1,595 ft (486 m)
- Time zone: UTC-5 (Eastern (EST))
  - Summer (DST): UTC-4 (EDT)
- GNIS ID: 1558720

Zevely is an unincorporated community in Preston County, West Virginia, United States.
