= Orr, West Virginia =

Orr
- Unincorporated community
- Location within the state of West Virginia Orr (the United States)
- Coordinates: 39°33′12″N 79°31′42″W
- Country: United States
- State: West Virginia
- County: Preston
- Elevation: 2,382 ft (726 m)
- Time zone: UTC-5 (Eastern (EST))
  - Summer (DST): UTC-4 (EDT)
- GNIS ID: 1555276

Orr is an unincorporated community in Preston County, West Virginia, United States.
