= Eglon, West Virginia =

Unincorporated community in West Virginia, United States

Eglon
- Unincorporated community
- Location within the state of West Virginia Eglon (the United States)
- Coordinates: 39°18′5″N 79°31′9″W
- Country: United States
- State: West Virginia
- County: Preston
- Elevation: 2,628 ft (801 m)
- Time zone: UTC-5 (Eastern (EST))
  - Summer (DST): UTC-4 (EDT)
- ZIP codes: 26716
- GNIS feature ID: 1551023

Eglon (also Hungry Hook or Maple Run) is an unincorporated community in Preston County, West Virginia, United States. Its elevation is 2,628 feet (801 m). It has a post office with the ZIP code 26716.

The community was named after the biblical city of Eglon.
