= Manheim, West Virginia =

Manheim
- Neighborhood
- Nickname: The "Burg"
- Location within the state of West Virginia
- Coordinates: 39°21′37″N 79°41′27″W
- Country: United States
- State: West Virginia
- County: Preston
- Town: Rowlesburg

Population (2000)
  - Total: 100
- Time zone: UTC-5 (Eastern (EST))
  - Summer (DST): UTC-4 (EDT)

Manheim is a small neighborhood located near the Cheat River that is incorporated within the town of Rowlesburg in Preston County, West Virginia, United States.

The community was named, directly or indirectly, after Manheim, in Germany.
