= Little Sandy, West Virginia =

Little Sandy
- Unincorporated community
- Location within the state of West Virginia Little Sandy (the United States)
- Coordinates: 39°37′49″N 79°38′40″W
- Country: United States
- State: West Virginia
- County: Preston
- Elevation: 1,565 ft (477 m)
- Time zone: UTC-5 (Eastern (EST))
  - Summer (DST): UTC-4 (EDT)
- GNIS ID: 1558589

Little Sandy is an unincorporated community in Preston County, West Virginia, United States.
