= Fellowsville, West Virginia =

Unincorporated community in West Virginia, United States

- Unincorporated community
- Location within West Virginia Location within the United States
- Coordinates: 39°19′50″N 79°49′28″W
- Country: United States
- State: West Virginia
- County: Preston
- Elevation: 1,365 ft (416 m)
- Time zone: UTC-5 (Eastern (EST))
  - Summer (DST): UTC-4 (EDT)
- Area codes: 304 & 681
- GNIS feature ID: 1538915

Fellowsville is an unincorporated community in Preston County, West Virginia, United States. Fellowsville is located at the junction of U.S. Route 50 and West Virginia Route 26, 4.5 miles (7.2 km) south-southeast of Newburg.

== History ==
Fellowsville was laid out in 1848. The community was named for Joseph Fellows, the uncle of the founder.
