= Three Forks =

Three Forks may refer to:

- Cape Three Forks, a cape in northern Morocco
- Three Forks, Arizona, a populated place in Apache County
- Park City, Kentucky, an incorporated city in Barren Co. formerly known as Three Forks
- Three Forks, Warren County, Kentucky, an unincorporated community
- Saint Helens, Kentucky, an unincorporated community in Lee Co. also known as Three Forks
- Three Forks, Montana, a city in Gallatin County
- Three Forks (Oklahoma), a historical area around the confluence of the Arkansas, Verdigris, and Grand Rivers
- Three Forks, Oregon a populated place in Grant County, Oregon
- Three Forks (Oregon), a locale on the Owyhee River in Malheur County, Oregon
- Three Forks, Wyoming, an unincorporated community in Carbon County
- Three Forks, British Columbia, a ghost town
- Three Forks Shale

== See also ==
- Threefork Bridge, West Virginia
