= West End, West Virginia =

West End
- Unincorporated community
- Location within the state of West Virginia West End (the United States)
- Coordinates: 39°23′25″N 79°46′15″W
- Country: United States
- State: West Virginia
- County: Preston
- Elevation: 1,805 ft (550 m)
- Time zone: UTC-5 (Eastern (EST))
  - Summer (DST): UTC-4 (EDT)
- GNIS ID: 1555942

West End is an unincorporated community in Preston County, West Virginia, United States.

West End was so named due to its location near the western portal of the Kingwood Tunnel.
