= Lenox, West Virginia =

Lenox
- Unincorporated community
- Location within the state of West Virginia Lenox (the United States)
- Coordinates: 39°34′00″N 79°35′25″W
- Country: United States
- State: West Virginia
- County: Preston
- Elevation: 2,106 ft (642 m)
- Time zone: UTC-5 (Eastern (EST))
  - Summer (DST): UTC-4 (EDT)
- GNIS ID: 1541782

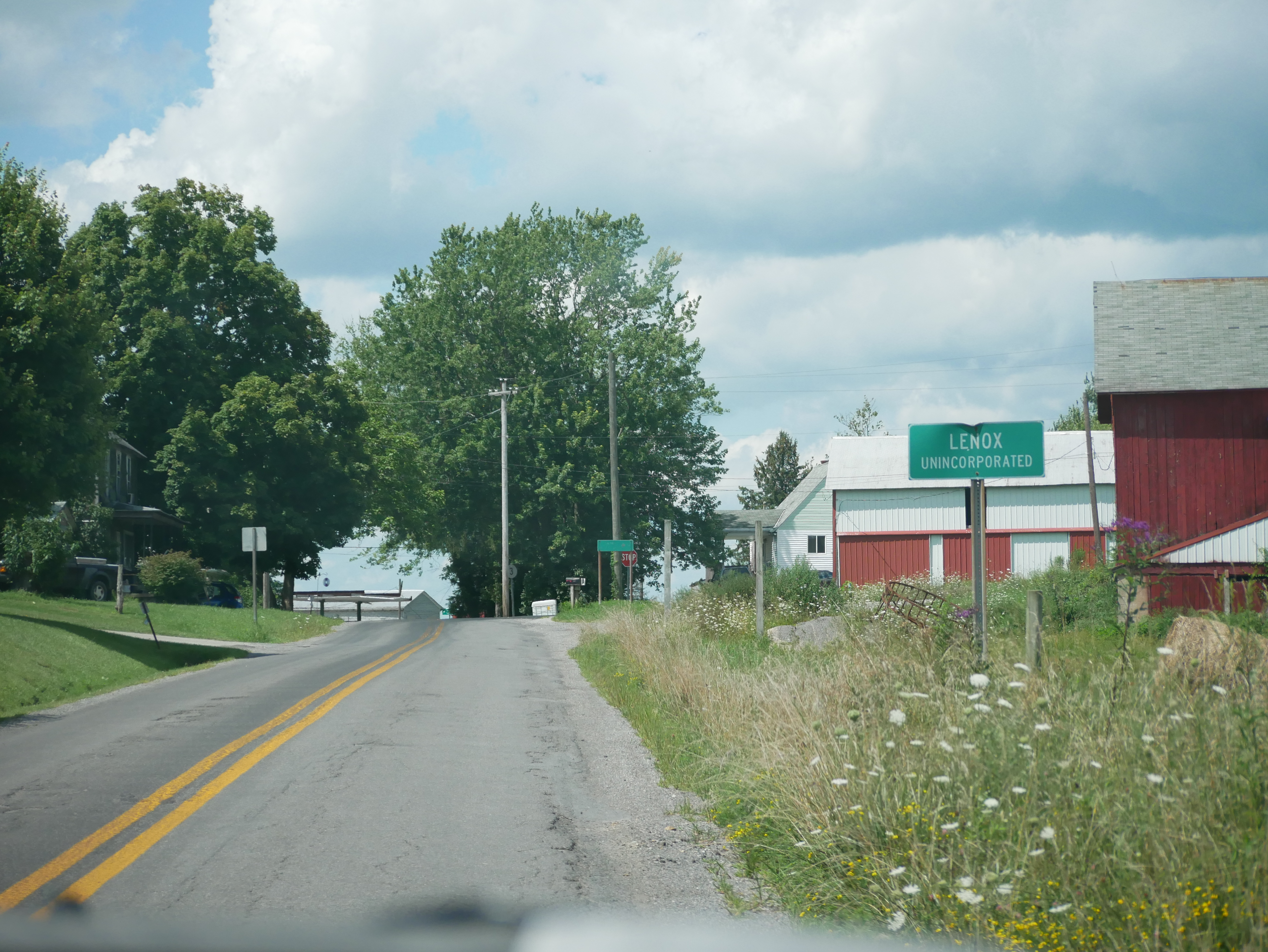
Brandonville Pike heading north into Lenox.

Lenox is an unincorporated community in Preston County, West Virginia, United States. Its post office has been closed.
