= Cranesville Swamp Preserve =

1,600-acre preserve in West Virginia and Maryland

- IUCN category V (protected landscape/seascape)
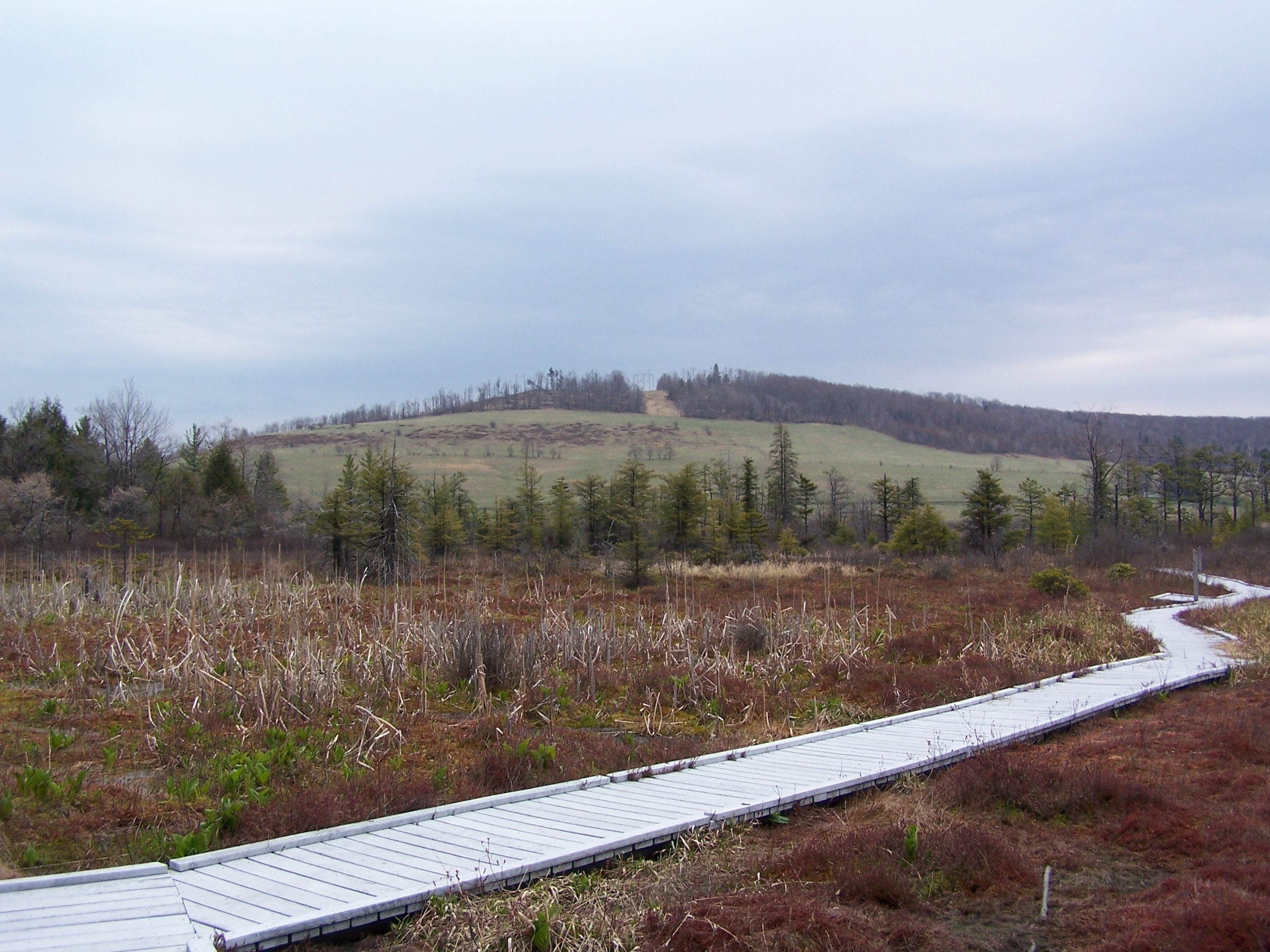
- Bog at Cranesville Swamp

- Location within West Virginia
- Location: United States
- Coordinates: 39°31′53″N 79°28′55″W
- Area: 1,600 acres (6.5 km^{2})
- Elevation: 2,547 ft (776 m)
- Established: 1960
- Website: Cranesville Swamp Preserve

U.S. National Natural Landmark
- Designated: 1964

Cranesville Swamp Preserve is a 1,600-acre (650 ha) preserve situated in Preston County, West Virginia and Garrett County, Maryland, unusual in harboring many plants and animals that are normally only seen in more northern climates.

== History ==
The Nature Conservancy purchased the 1,600 acres (650 ha) beginning in 1960. In October 1964, the site was designated as one of the first National Natural Landmarks in the country.

== Geology ==
Cranesville Swamp is situated in a natural bowl, or "frost pocket", creating a climate that is more consistent with more northerly regions.

== Ecology ==
=== Flora ===
Cranesville Swamp's unusual setting allows 19 different plant communities to flourish, with the most dominant species being, among others, sphagnum moss, speckled alder (Alnus rugosa), various sedges (Carex folliculata, and C. stricta) and grasses. Bog species include round-leaved sundew (Drosera rotundifolia) and narrowleaf gentian (Gentiana linearis).

The swamp is also home to the southernmost natural community of American larches.

=== Fauna ===
In addition to black bear, porcupine, snowshoe hare and a wide variety of birds, the rare northern water shrew has been documented here. Birders have also noted the golden-crowned kinglet and Nashville warbler, rarely seen in this area.
