= Bull Run, Preston County, West Virginia =

Unincorporated community in West Virginia, United States

Bull Run
- Unincorporated community
- Location within the state of West Virginia Bull Run (the United States)
- Coordinates: 39°35′02″N 79°46′12″W
- Country: United States
- State: West Virginia
- County: Preston
- Elevation: 1,326 ft (404 m)
- Time zone: UTC-5 (Eastern (EST))
  - Summer (DST): UTC-4 (EDT)
- GNIS ID: 1536702

Bull Run is an unincorporated community in Preston County, West Virginia, United States.
