= Borgmann =

Borgmann is a surname of German origin. Notable people with the surname include:

- Albert Borgmann (1937–2023), German-born American philosopher
- Bennie Borgmann (1900–1978), American basketball player
- Carl Borgmann (1905–1998), American educator and chemical engineer
- Dmitri Borgmann (1927–1985), German-American author
- Heinrich Borgmann (1912–1945), German military officer during World War II
- Wolfgang Borgmann, singer with the band Mekong Delta (band)

== See also ==
- Borgman (disambiguation)
