= Pleasantdale, Preston County, West Virginia =

Pleasantdale
- Unincorporated community
- Location within the state of West Virginia Pleasantdale (the United States)
- Coordinates: 39°30′8″N 79°41′2″W
- Country: United States
- State: West Virginia
- County: Preston
- Elevation: 1,660 ft (510 m)
- Time zone: UTC-5 (Eastern (EST))
  - Summer (DST): UTC-4 (EDT)
- GNIS ID: 1555375

Pleasantdale is an unincorporated community in Preston County, West Virginia, United States.
