= Cuzzart, West Virginia =

Unincorporated community in West Virginia, United States

- Unincorporated community
- Location within West Virginia Location within the United States
- Coordinates: 39°35′37″N 79°33′53″W
- Country: United States
- State: West Virginia
- County: Preston
- Elevation: 2,110 ft (640 m)
- Time zone: UTC-5 (Eastern (EST))
  - Summer (DST): UTC-4 (EDT)
- Area codes: 304 & 681
- GNIS feature ID: 1537952

Cuzzart is an unincorporated community in Preston County, West Virginia, United States. Cuzzart is located at the junction of County Routes 5, 11, 20, and 28, 10.5 miles (16.9 km) northeast of Kingwood. Cuzzart had a post office, which closed on April 16, 1994.

Cuzzart most likely derives its name from a local family.
