= Austen, West Virginia =

Unincorporated community in West Virginia, United States

Austen
- Unincorporated community
- Location within the state of West Virginia Austen (the United States)
- Coordinates: 39°23′17″N 79°48′3″W
- Country: United States
- State: West Virginia
- County: Preston
- Elevation: 1,621 ft (494 m)
- Time zone: UTC-5 (Eastern (EST))
  - Summer (DST): UTC-4 (EDT)
- GNIS ID: 1553765

Austen is an unincorporated community in Preston County, West Virginia, United States.

The community may be named for one Dr. Austen, the original owner of the town site.
