= Manown, West Virginia =

Manown
- Unincorporated community
- Location within the state of West Virginia Manown (the United States)
- Coordinates: 39°29′34″N 79°44′42″W
- Country: United States
- State: West Virginia
- County: Preston
- Elevation: 2,188 ft (667 m)
- Time zone: UTC-5 (Eastern (EST))
  - Summer (DST): UTC-4 (EDT)
- GNIS ID: 1542727

Manown is an unincorporated community in Preston County, West Virginia, United States.

The community derives its name from the local Manown family.
