= Sugar Valley, Preston County, West Virginia =

Sugar Valley
- Unincorporated community
- Location within the state of West Virginia Sugar Valley (the United States)
- Coordinates: 39°36′40″N 79°38′24″W
- Country: United States
- State: West Virginia
- County: Preston
- Elevation: 1,706 ft (520 m)
- Time zone: UTC-5 (Eastern (EST))
  - Summer (DST): UTC-4 (EDT)
- GNIS ID: 1547660

Sugar Valley is an unincorporated community in Preston County, West Virginia, United States.
