= Valley Point, West Virginia =

Valley Point
- Unincorporated community
- Location within the state of West Virginia Valley Point (the United States)
- Coordinates: 39°34′48″N 79°38′12″W
- Country: United States
- State: West Virginia
- County: Preston
- Elevation: 1,936 ft (590 m)
- Time zone: UTC-5 (Eastern (EST))
  - Summer (DST): UTC-4 (EDT)
- GNIS ID: 1555873

Valley Point is an unincorporated community in Preston County, West Virginia, United States.

An early variant name was Moriah.
