= Saint Joe, West Virginia =

Saint Joe
- Unincorporated community
- Location within the state of West Virginia Saint Joe (the United States)
- Coordinates: 39°29′19″N 79°37′56″W
- Country: United States
- State: West Virginia
- County: Preston
- Elevation: 1,217 ft (371 m)
- Time zone: UTC-5 (Eastern (EST))
  - Summer (DST): UTC-4 (EDT)
- GNIS ID: 1555555

Saint Joe is an unincorporated community in Preston County, West Virginia, United States.

The community was named for the fact three of its first settlers were named Joseph.
