= Glade Farms, West Virginia =

Unincorporated community in West Virginia, United States

- Unincorporated community
- Location within West Virginia Location within the United States
- Coordinates: 39°42′20″N 79°31′27″W
- Country: United States
- State: West Virginia
- County: Preston
- Elevation: 2,116 ft (645 m)
- Time zone: UTC-5 (Eastern (EST))
  - Summer (DST): UTC-4 (EDT)
- Area codes: 304 & 681
- GNIS feature ID: 1539427

Glade Farms is an unincorporated community in Preston County, West Virginia, United States. Glade Farms is located on West Virginia Route 26, 6 miles (9.7 km) north-northeast of Brandonville.

The community was so named on account of the marshy glades near the original town site.
