= Rhine Creek (West Virginia) =

Stream in Preston County, West Virginia, U.S.

Coordinates: 39°20′18″N 79°29′46″W

Rhine Creek is a stream in Preston County, West Virginia, in the United States.

Rhine Creek was named after the Rhine river, in Europe.

== See also ==
- List of rivers of West Virginia
