= Mountain View (south), Preston County, West Virginia =

Mountain View, West Virginia
- Unincorporated community
- Location within West Virginia Location within the United States
- Coordinates: 39°21′40″N 79°43′54″W
- Country: United States
- State: West Virginia
- County: Preston
- Elevation: 2,382 ft (726 m)
- Time zone: UTC-5 (Eastern (EST))
  - Summer (DST): UTC-4 (EDT)
- Area codes: 304 & 681
- GNIS feature ID: 1558618

Mountain View is an unincorporated community in Preston County, West Virginia, United States. Mountain View is located on County Route 70, 2.3 miles (3.7 km) south-southeast of Tunnelton.
