= Sell, West Virginia =

Sell
- Unincorporated community
- Location within the state of West Virginia Sell (the United States)
- Coordinates: 39°15′54″N 79°35′12″W
- Country: United States
- State: West Virginia
- County: Preston
- Elevation: 2,746 ft (837 m)
- Time zone: UTC-5 (Eastern (EST))
  - Summer (DST): UTC-4 (EDT)
- GNIS ID: 1552826

Sell is an unincorporated community in Preston County, West Virginia, United States.
