= Sinclair, West Virginia =

Sinclair
- Unincorporated community
- Location within the state of West Virginia Sinclair (the United States)
- Coordinates: 39°16′5″N 79°49′14″W
- Country: United States
- State: West Virginia
- County: Preston
- Elevation: 1,473 ft (449 m)
- Time zone: UTC-5 (Eastern (EST))
  - Summer (DST): UTC-4 (EDT)
- GNIS ID: 1549930

Sinclair is an unincorporated community in Preston County, West Virginia, United States, located at the intersection of Davis Hill Road and Sinclair Coalbank Road. The town is named after oil drilling in the area performed by Sinclair Oil Corp. The Sinclair United Methodist Church is also located in Sinclair, West Virginia.

== See also ==
- Unincorporated communities in West Virginia
