= Herring, West Virginia =

- Unincorporated community
- Location within West Virginia Location within the United States
- Coordinates: 39°32′33″N 79°44′17″W
- Country: United States
- State: West Virginia
- County: Preston
- Elevation: 2,005 ft (611 m)
- Time zone: UTC-5 (Eastern (EST))
  - Summer (DST): UTC-4 (EDT)
- Area codes: 304 & 681
- GNIS feature ID: 1549737

Herring is an unincorporated community in Preston County, West Virginia, United States.
