= Marquess, West Virginia =

Marquess
- Unincorporated community
- Location within the state of West Virginia Marquess (the United States)
- Coordinates: 39°17′54″N 79°51′3″W
- Country: United States
- State: West Virginia
- County: Preston
- Elevation: 1,332 ft (406 m)
- Time zone: UTC-5 (Eastern (EST))
  - Summer (DST): UTC-4 (EDT)
- GNIS ID: 1549809

Marquess is an unincorporated community in Preston County, West Virginia.
