= Howesville, West Virginia =

Howesville
- Unincorporated community
- Location within the state of West Virginia Howesville (the United States)
- Coordinates: 39°26′21″N 79°45′21″W
- Country: United States
- State: West Virginia
- County: Preston
- Elevation: 2,218 ft (676 m)
- Time zone: UTC-5 (Eastern (EST))
  - Summer (DST): UTC-4 (EDT)
- GNIS feature ID: 1540535

Howesville is an unincorporated community and coal town in Preston County, West Virginia, United States. It sits at an altitude of 2,218 feet (676 m). The community once possessed a post office, which has since been closed.

Howesville was named for James D. Howe, who opened a store there in the 1860s. The community was originally built up chiefly by Germans.

St. Joseph's Cemetery and Catholic Church are located in Howesville. The original church was built in the 1840s. It was replaced by the current structure. Nicholas Borgman, who was one of the people who helped build the original church, was the first person buried in St. Joseph's Cemetery in January 1847. His gravestone is still standing.

== Meteorite Hoax of 1920 ==
A hoax news dispatch in 1920, picked up by major newspapers across the U.S., reported that on November 22, 1920, residents of the area "were thrown into a panic tonight when a large meteor fell at Howesville.. according to reports received here." The news story added that "The meteor struck in the business section of Howesville, near the railroad station. It exploded as it buried itself in the earth. The force of the blast was heard for several miles. An automobile standing near the railroad station was damaged by the explosion and the occupants of the machine were dazed, but escaped injury." The dispatch added "There are no telephones in Howesville and detailed information as to the meteor could not be obtained tonight.
