= Alpine Lake, West Virginia =

Unincorporated community in West Virginia, United States

Alpine Lake
- Unincorporated community
- Alpine Lake West Virginia
- Motto: refresh, renew, revive
- Location within the state of West Virginia Alpine Lake (the United States)
- Coordinates: 39°28′29″N 79°30′2″W
- Country: United States
- State: West Virginia
- County: Preston
- Elevation: 2,595 ft (791 m)
- Time zone: UTC-5 (Eastern (EST))
  - Summer (DST): UTC-4 (EDT)
- GNIS feature ID: 1558427

Alpine Lake is an unincorporated community located in Preston County, West Virginia, United States.
