= Aurora, West Virginia =

- Census-designated place
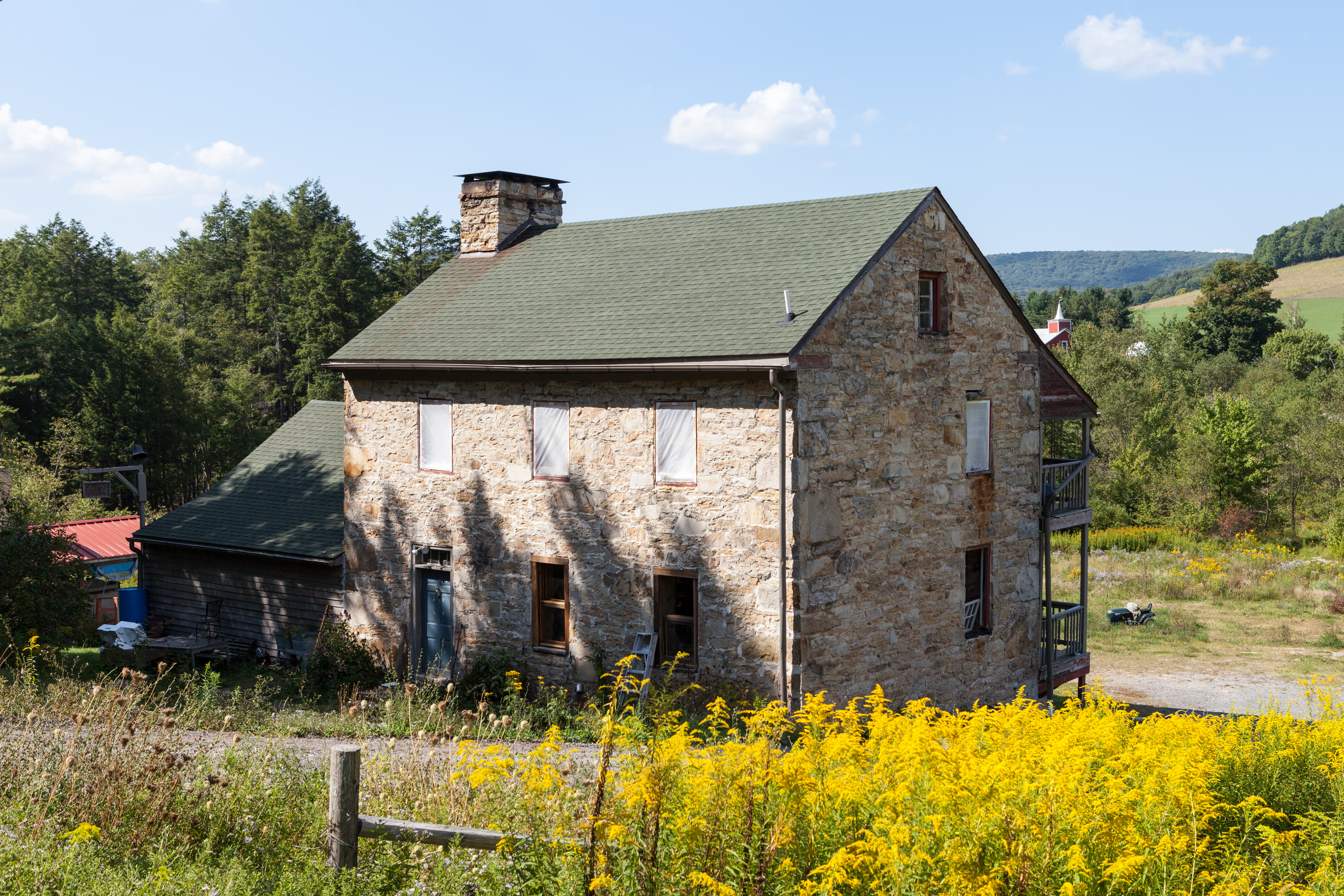
- Red Horse Tavern

- Location in Preston County, West Virginia
- Coordinates: 39°19′27″N 79°33′16″W
- Country: United States
- State: West Virginia
- County: Preston

Area
  - Total: 2.109 sq mi (5.46 km^{2})
  - Land: 2.109 sq mi (5.46 km^{2})
  - Water: 0 sq mi (0 km^{2})
- Elevation: 2,644 ft (806 m)

Population (2020)
  - Total: 200
  - Density: 95/sq mi (37/km^{2})
- Time zone: UTC-5 (Eastern (EST))
  - Summer (DST): UTC-4 (EDT)
- GNIS feature ID: 1556729

Aurora is an unincorporated community and census-designated place in Preston County, West Virginia, United States. The population was 200 at the 2020 census. Aurora is located on U.S. Route 50 between Rowlesburg and the Maryland state line. Cathedral State Park is located to the east of Aurora's post office.

== History ==
Aurora was originally a German settlement. The town was originally called Salem and later Mount Carmel. Its current name was suggested because of the town's high altitude. One of the original settlers to the area was John Stough, a Lutheran minister. The primary industries throughout the early and mid-19th century were farming and timber. In the late 1880s, the town became known as a resort area as the result of several large hotels which were built in the area. Some of these featured casinos, pools, and concert halls. In the 1930s an artist colony formed in the nearby Youghiogheny Forest area.

Located near Aurora are the Brookside Historic District, Gaymont and the Red Horse Tavern, listed on the National Register of Historic Places.

== Popular culture ==
Majority of the film Recovery Boys takes place in Aurora, West Virginia.
