= White Oak Springs, West Virginia =

White Oak Springs
- Unincorporated community
- Location within the state of West Virginia White Oak Springs (the United States)
- Coordinates: 39°29′13″N 79°30′2″W
- Country: United States
- State: West Virginia
- County: Preston
- Elevation: 2,730 ft (830 m)
- Time zone: UTC-5 (Eastern (EST))
  - Summer (DST): UTC-4 (EDT)
- GNIS ID: 1549070

White Oak Springs is an unincorporated community in Preston County, West Virginia, United States.
