= Turner Douglass, West Virginia =

Turner Douglass
- Unincorporated community
- Location within the state of West Virginia Turner Douglass (the United States)
- Coordinates: 39°22′30″N 79°29′39″W
- Country: United States
- State: West Virginia
- County: Preston
- Elevation: 2,418 ft (737 m)
- Time zone: UTC-5 (Eastern (EST))
  - Summer (DST): UTC-4 (EDT)
- GNIS ID: 1555839

Turner Douglass is an unincorporated community in Preston County, West Virginia, United States.
