= Mount Olivet, Preston County, West Virginia =

Mount Olivet, West Virginia
- Unincorporated community
- Location within West Virginia Location within the United States
- Coordinates: 39°20′19″N 79°37′13″W
- Country: United States
- State: West Virginia
- County: Preston
- Elevation: 2,612 ft (796 m)
- Time zone: UTC-5 (Eastern (EST))
  - Summer (DST): UTC-4 (EDT)
- Area codes: 304 & 681
- GNIS feature ID: 1552213

Mount Olivet is an unincorporated community in Preston County, West Virginia, United States. Mount Olivet is 2.5 miles (4.0 km) east of Rowlesburg.
