= Hopemont, West Virginia =

Hopemont
- Unincorporated community
- Location within the state of West Virginia Hopemont (the United States)
- Coordinates: 39°26′14″N 79°31′2″W
- Country: United States
- State: West Virginia
- County: Preston
- Elevation: 2,503 ft (763 m)
- Time zone: UTC-5 (Eastern (EST))
  - Summer (DST): UTC-4 (EDT)
- GNIS feature ID: 1549749

Hopemont is an unincorporated community in Preston County, West Virginia, United States. It is located to the east of Terra Alta and is the home of Hopemont State Hospital, originally created as the West Virginia State Tuberculosis Sanitarium. According to the Geographic Names Information System, Hopemont has also been known as Rinards Crossing.

== Hopemont Blues ==
The following poem appeared in the Logan Banner of Logan, WV, on July 7, 1922. The author was Sally Godbey, who gave her address as the “State T.B. Sanitarium, Hopemont, Terra Alta, W.Va.”

THE HOPEMONT BLUES

When the golden sun is sinking
Behind the hills of old Hopemont,
When of home and friends I’m thinking
That “what-might-have-been” is not.

When the night birds’ soft notes falling,
Melodies sweet float on the air,
Then my thoughts go back to Logan,
And the friends that I left there.

When the sighing night-winds moaning,
Groaning through the old oak trees
and the strain of “Home Sweet Home”
Carry softly on the breeze,

Then is when my thoughts go roaming,
Filled with memories old and new
Days of gladness, days of sadness,
Nights so happy, nights so blue.

Though there’s many miles between us,
Little town I love you yet,
And I long to hurry back,
For I’m homesick and regret

That I ever left you Logan,
But I had to, so they say.
I’m lonesome for the old home town,
And I’m coming back some day,

They say that you are a dull little town,
They spell it with a capital D.
They wish that they could get away,
But you are all the world to me,

And though the world is a very big place
My home has always been with you.
And I find you quite a nice little town,
With friends both kind and true.
