= Sanchakou =

Sanchakou (Chinese: 三岔口; lit. 'Triple Fork') may refer to:

- Sanchakou, a traditional Chinese opera based on an episode from the Generals of the Yang Family saga
- Divergence (film), a 2005 Hong Kong film with this Chinese title

== Places in China ==
- Sanchakou, Heilongjiang, a town in Dongning, Heilongjiang
- Sanchakou Township, a township in Qahar Right Front Banner, Inner Mongolia
- Achal, also known as Sanchakou, a town in Maralbexi County, Xinjiang
