= Victoria, West Virginia =

Victoria
- Unincorporated community
- Location within the state of West Virginia Victoria (the United States)
- Coordinates: 39°25′4″N 79°53′21″W
- Country: United States
- State: West Virginia
- County: Preston
- Elevation: 1,253 ft (382 m)
- Time zone: UTC-5 (Eastern (EST))
  - Summer (DST): UTC-4 (EDT)
- GNIS ID: 1548657

Victoria is an unincorporated community in Preston County, West Virginia, United States.

An early variant name was Irondale.
