= Stevensburg, West Virginia =

Stevensburg
- Unincorporated community
- Location within the state of West Virginia Stevensburg (the United States)
- Coordinates: 39°18′3″N 79°47′44″W
- Country: United States
- State: West Virginia
- County: Preston
- Elevation: 1,499 ft (457 m)
- Time zone: UTC-5 (Eastern (EST))
  - Summer (DST): UTC-4 (EDT)
- GNIS feature ID: 1555710

Stevensburg is an unincorporated community located in Preston County, West Virginia, United States.
