= Scotch Hill, West Virginia =

Scotch Hill
- Unincorporated community
- Location within the state of West Virginia Scotch Hill (the United States)
- Coordinates: 39°22′27″N 79°51′57″W
- Country: United States
- State: West Virginia
- County: Preston
- Elevation: 1,670 ft (510 m)
- Time zone: UTC-5 (Eastern (EST))
  - Summer (DST): UTC-4 (EDT)
- GNIS feature ID: 1549916

Scotch Hill is an unincorporated community located in Preston County, West Virginia, United States.

A large share of the early miners at Scotch Hill being of Scotch descent caused the name to be selected.
