= Threefork Bridge, West Virginia =

Threefork Bridge
- Unincorporated community
- Location within the state of West Virginia Threefork Bridge (the United States)
- Coordinates: 39°26′25″N 79°50′58″W
- Country: United States
- State: West Virginia
- County: Preston
- Elevation: 1,286 ft (392 m)
- Time zone: UTC-5 (Eastern (EST))
  - Summer (DST): UTC-4 (EDT)
- GNIS ID: 1555810

Threefork Bridge is an unincorporated community in Preston County, West Virginia, United States.
