= Colebank, West Virginia =

Unincorporated community in West Virginia, United States

Colebank
- Unincorporated community
- Location within the state of West Virginia Colebank (the United States)
- Coordinates: 39°14′38″N 79°50′32″W
- Country: United States
- State: West Virginia
- County: Preston
- Elevation: 1,447 ft (441 m)
- Time zone: UTC-5 (Eastern (EST))
  - Summer (DST): UTC-4 (EDT)
- GNIS ID: 1550765

Colebank is an unincorporated community in Preston County, West Virginia, United States.
