= Horse Shoe Run, West Virginia =

- Unincorporated community
- Location within West Virginia Location within the United States
- Coordinates: 39°16′15″N 79°30′51″W
- Country: United States
- State: West Virginia
- County: Preston
- Elevation: 2,605 ft (794 m)
- Time zone: UTC-5 (Eastern (EST))
  - Summer (DST): UTC-4 (EDT)
- ZIP code: 26769
- Area codes: 304 & 681
- GNIS feature ID: 1551499

Horse Shoe Run is an unincorporated community in Preston County, West Virginia, United States. Horse Shoe Run is located on West Virginia Route 24, 8.5 miles (13.7 km) north of Thomas.
