= Jan Borgman =

Dutch astronomer (1929–2021)

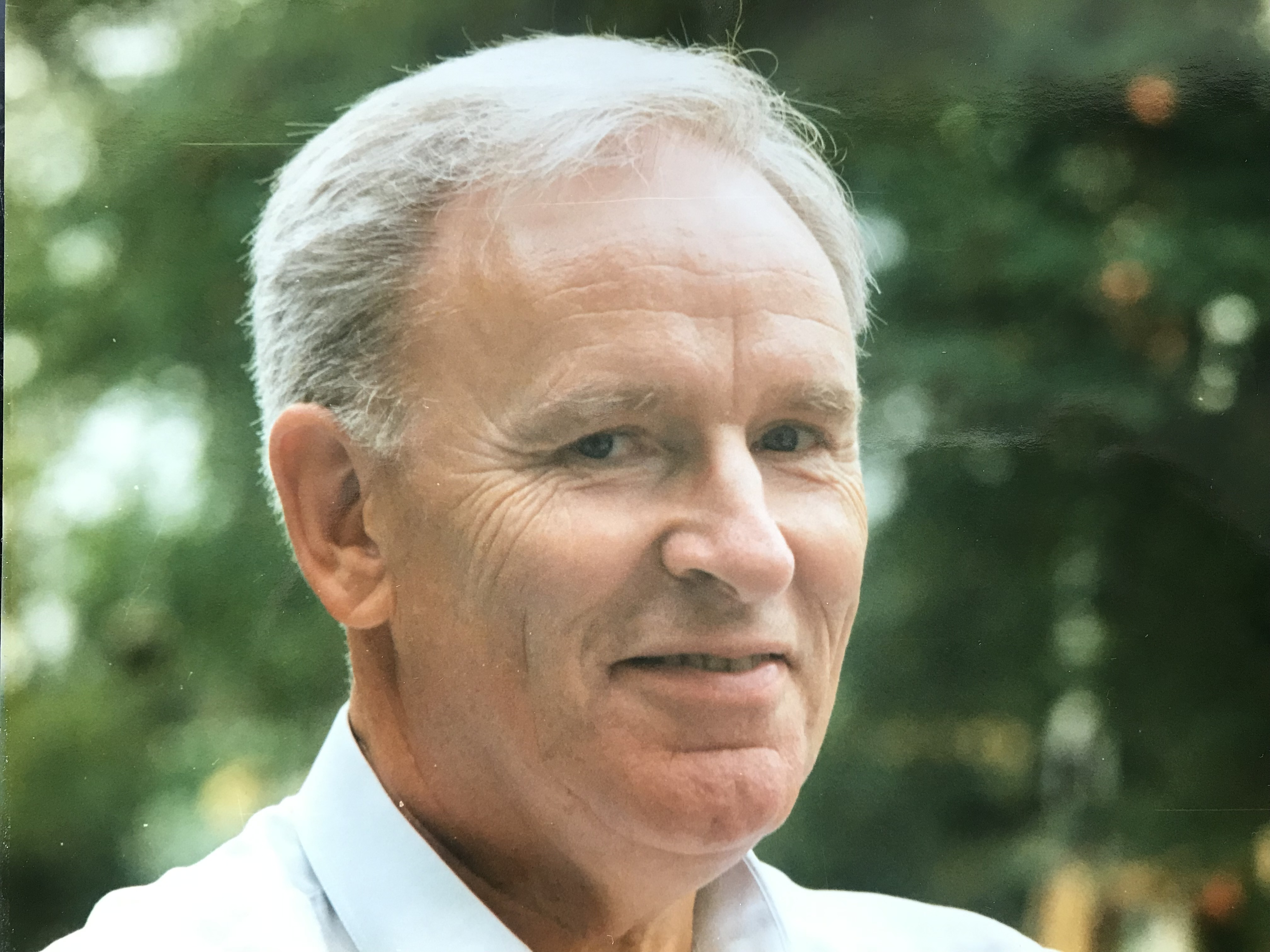

Jan Borgman (30 November 1929 - May 26, 2021) was a Dutch astronomer and university administrator. He was professor of astronomical observation technique at the University of Groningen from 1968 to 1988. During this period he served as rector magnificus from 1978 to 1981 and chair of the board of governors from 1981 to 1988. Borgman subsequently became chairperson of the Netherlands Organisation for Scientific Research.

== Career ==
Borgman was born in Groningen on 30 November 1929. As a high school student Borgman together with Maarten Schmidt knocked on the door of the Groningen astronomical laboratory, to be informed by Adriaan Blaauw of the possibilities of a study of astronomy. Borgman studied astronomy at the University of Groningen. Together with Pieter Johannes van Rhijn he did research on interstellar reddening with the use of the university telescope.

In 1956 Borgman obtained his PhD in photometry under Hendrik Brinkman, with a dissertation titled Electronic scanning for variable stars. He became lector in the field of astronomy in 1964. In 1965 Borgman became director of the newly opened Kapteyn observatory (Dutch: Kapteyn Sterrenwacht) in Roden. In 1968 he became professor of astronomical observation technique. At the observatory Borgman set up a work group in photometry, which later became involved with the Astronomical Netherlands Satellite. Borgman remained a professor at the university until 1988.

Borgman served as rector magnificus of the University of Groningen from 1978 to 1981. He was chair of the university board of governors from 1981 to 1988. Borgman then moved to The Hague to become chairperson of the newly formed Netherlands Organisation for Scientific Research. During this time he had to reorganize the underlying institutions.

From 1994 to 1997 Borgman was the first chairman of the European Commission European Science and Technology Assembly.

Borgman was elected a member of the Royal Netherlands Academy of Arts and Sciences in 1978.
