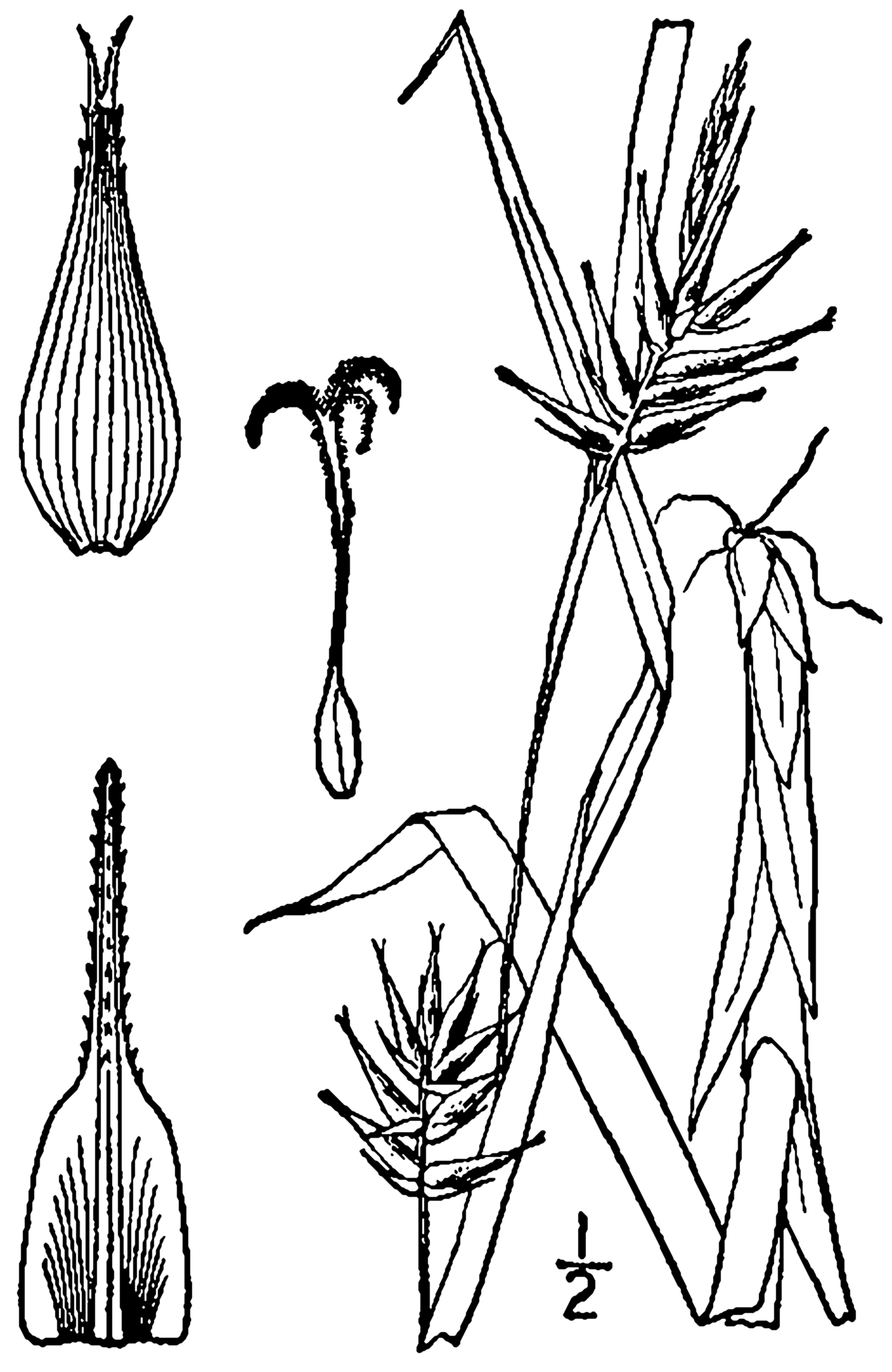
- Botanical illustration

Conservation status
- Least Concern (IUCN 3.1)

Scientific classification
- Kingdom: Plantae
- Clade: Tracheophytes
- Clade: Angiosperms
- Clade: Monocots
- Clade: Commelinids
- Order: Poales
- Family: Cyperaceae
- Genus: Carex
- Species: C. folliculata

Binomial name
- Carex folliculata L.

Synonyms
- Carex folliculata var. bispicata Peck; Carex folliculata var. xanthophysa (Wahlenb.) Muhl.; Carex folliculacea Crantz; Carex xanthophysa Wahlenb.

= Carex folliculata =

Species of plant

Carex folliculata, the northern long sedge, is a species of flowering plant in the family Cyperaceae. It is native to eastern Canada (and Saint Pierre and Miquelon), and the eastern United States (but in the southeast it is confined to the Appalachians). A clumping perennial reaching 150 cm (5 ft) but usually shorter, it has broad, yellowish-green leaves. An obligate wetland species, it is found in a wide variety of wet habitats from sea level up to 1,800 m (5,900 ft), and can handle acidic, neutral, and basic conditions.
