= Paul C. Borgman =

American writer

Dr. Paul Carlton Borgman (born 1940) is an author of religious works and professor of English at Gordon College in Wenham, Massachusetts.

Borgman is a specialist in biblical narrative. He received his B.A. from Wheaton College an M.A. from Southern Illinois University and a Ph.D. from the University of Chicago.

== Books ==
Borgman's books include:

- Genesis: The Story We Haven't Heard
- The Way according to Luke: Hearing the Whole Story of Luke Acts
- David, Saul, and God: Rediscovering An Ancient Masterpiece
- Written to Be Heard: Recovering the Messages of the Gospels (with Kelly James Clark)
