= Borgman, West Virginia =

Unincorporated community in West Virginia, United States

Borgman
- Unincorporated community
- Location within the state of West Virginia Borgman (the United States)
- Coordinates: 39°26′45″N 79°44′39″W
- Country: United States
- State: West Virginia
- County: Preston
- Elevation: 2,280 ft (690 m)
- Time zone: UTC-5 (Eastern (EST))
  - Summer (DST): UTC-4 (EDT)
- GNIS feature ID: 1553953

Borgman is an unincorporated community in Preston County, West Virginia, United States.

Borgman is located three miles west southwest from Kingwood. It is 2,280 feet (690 m) above sea level.

The area was named after a pioneer settler.
