= West Virginia Route 26 =

State highway in West Virginia, United States

West Virginia Route 26

Route information
- Maintained by WVDOH
- Length: 41.3 mi (66.5 km)

Major junctions
- South end: US 50 in Fellowsville
- WV 7 in Kingwood; I-68 in Bruceton Mills
- North end: PA 281 near Glade Farms

Location
- Country: United States
- State: West Virginia
- Counties: Preston

Highway system
- West Virginia State Highway System; Interstate; US; State
← WV 25	→ WV 27

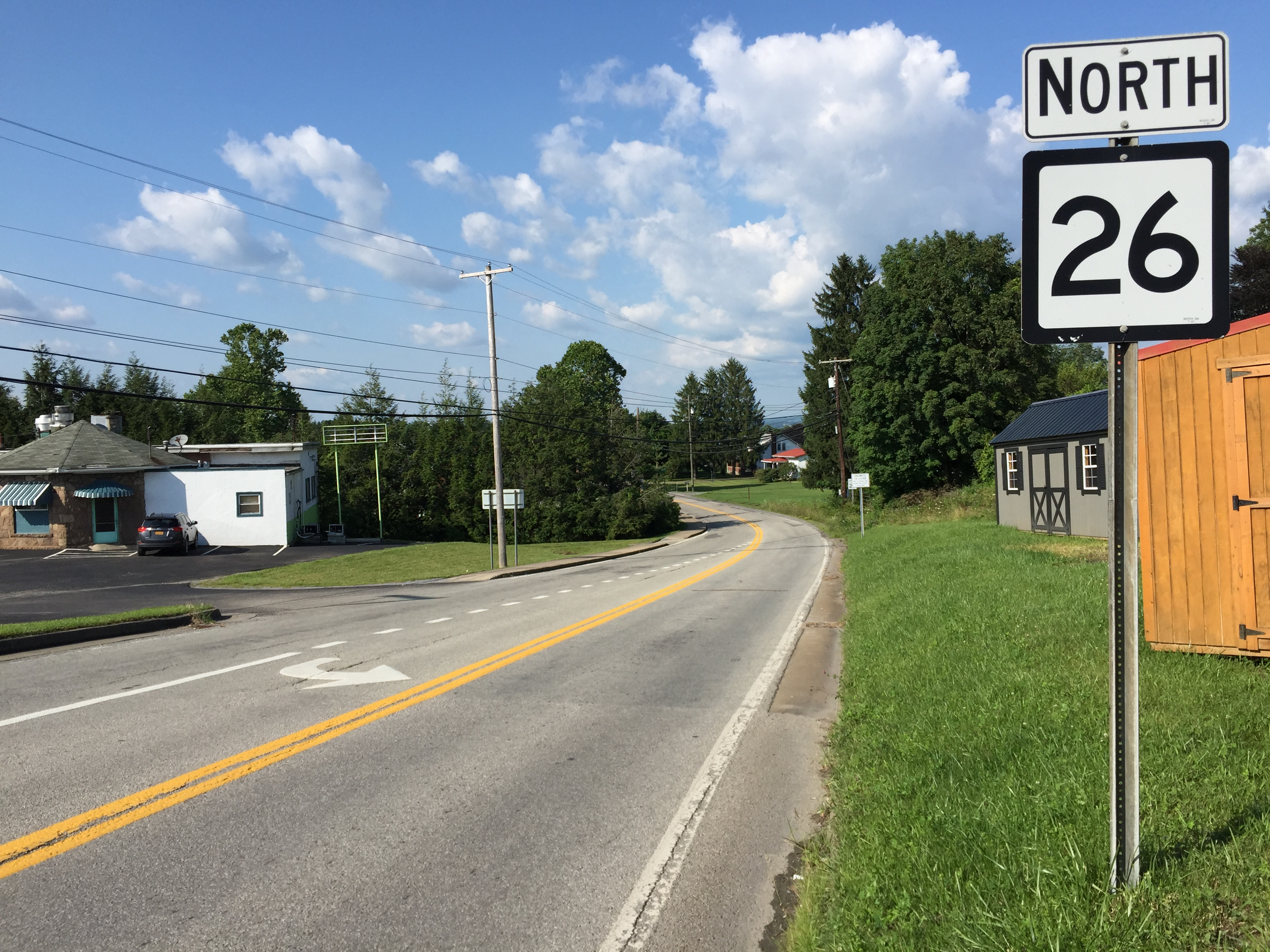
View north along WV 26 at WV 7 in Kingwood

West Virginia Route 26 is a north–south state highway located within Preston County in the U.S. state of West Virginia. The southern terminus of the route is at U.S. Route 50 in Fellowsville. The northern terminus is at the Pennsylvania state line northeast of Glade Farms, where WV 26 continues as Pennsylvania Route 281.

== Major intersections ==
The entire route is in Preston County.

Location	mi	km	Destinations	Notes
Fellowsville			US 50	
Kingwood			WV 7 – Kingwood, Oakland, MD	
			I-68 – Morgantown, Cumberland, MD	I-68 exit 23
			PA 281 north – Markleysburg	Pennsylvania state line
1.000 mi = 1.609 km; 1.000 km = 0.621 mi
