= Preston County, West Virginia =

County in West Virginia, United States

Preston County
- County
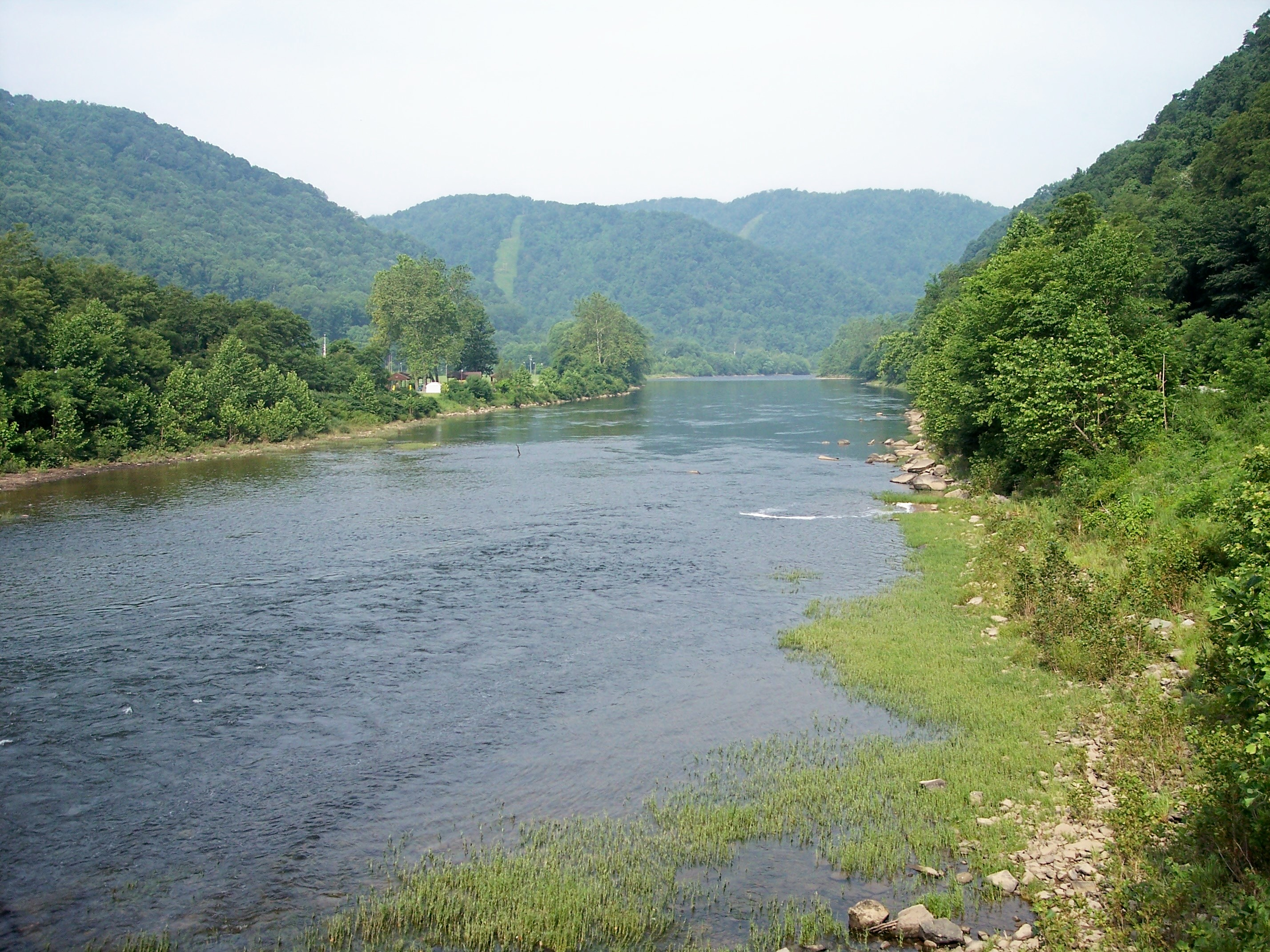
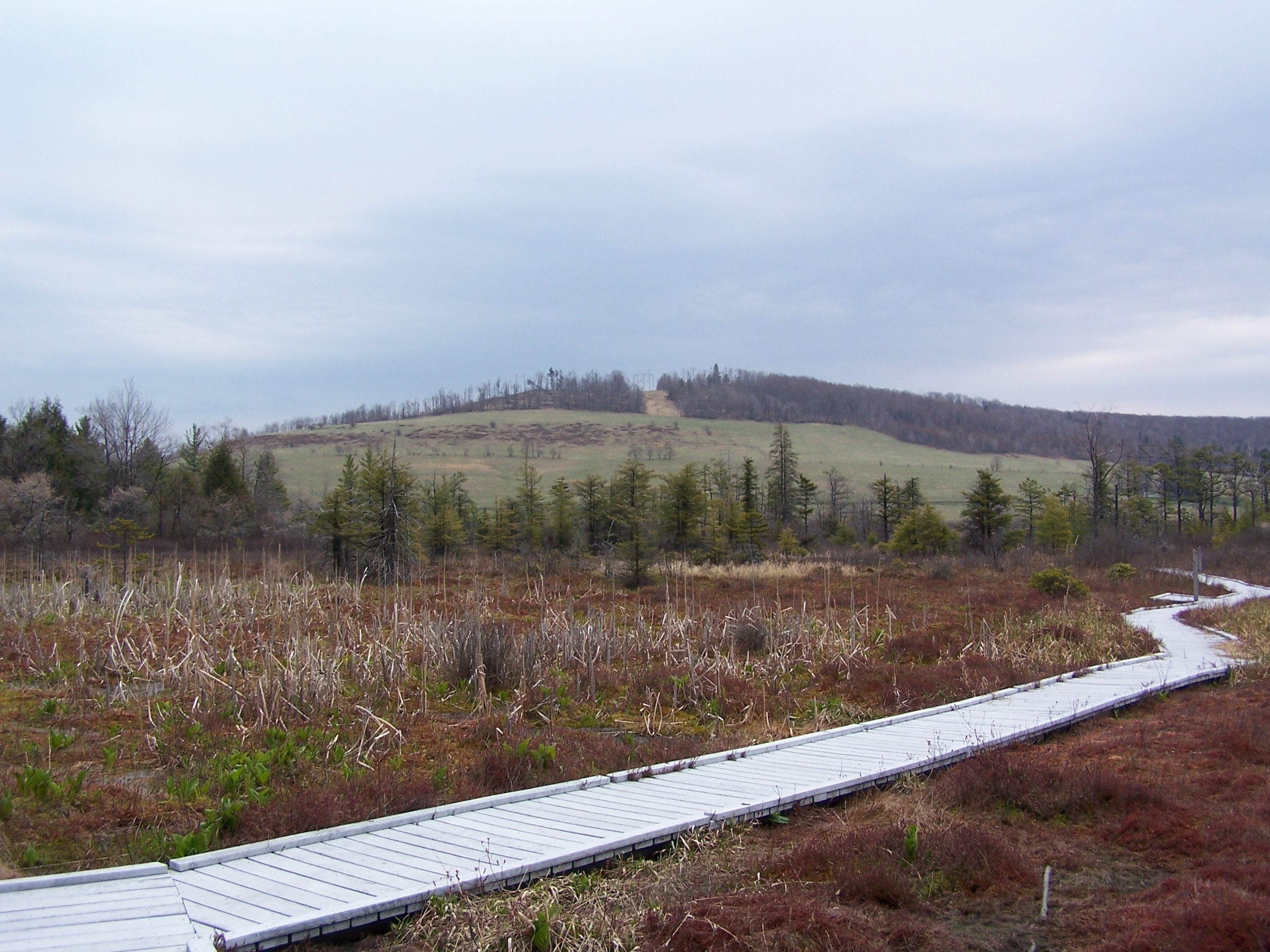
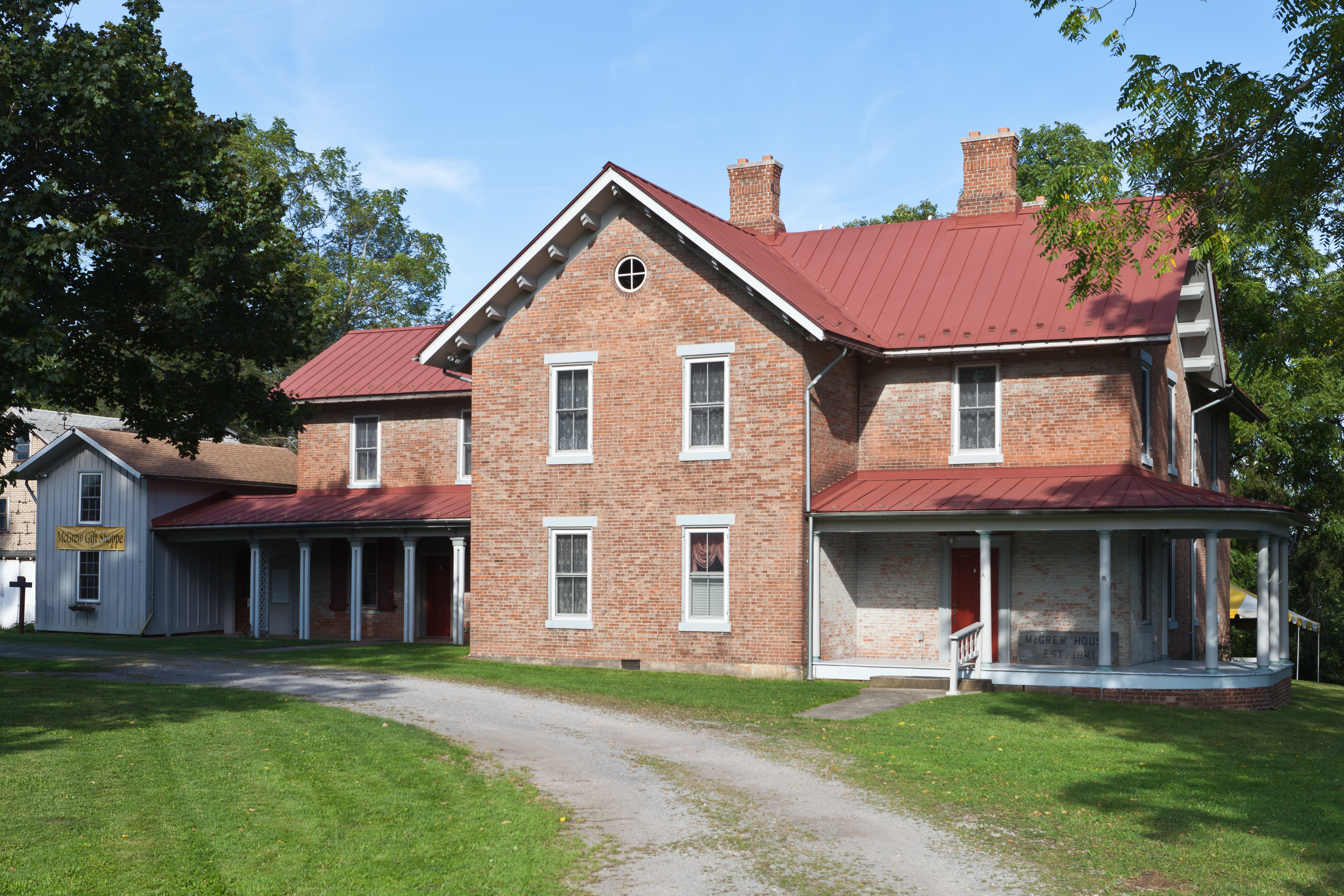
- Preston County Courthouse Arthurdale New Deal Community Cheat River Cranesville Swamp Preserve James Clark McGrew House in Kingwood

- Flag Seal

- Location of Preston County in West Virginia

- West Virginia's location within the U.S.
- Coordinates: 39.47°N 79.67°W
- Country: United States
- State: West Virginia
- Founded: January 19, 1818
- Named for: James Patton Preston
- Seat: Kingwood
- and Largest city

Government
  - Commission President: Samantha Stone (R)
  - County Commission: Don Smith (R); Hunter Thomas (R)

Area
  - Total: 651 sq mi (1,690 km^{2})
  - Land: 649 sq mi (1,680 km^{2})
  - Water: 2.6 sq mi (6.7 km^{2}) 0.4%
  - Rank: 8th

Population (2020)
  - Total: 34,216
  - Estimate (2025): 34,004 ▼
  - Rank: 15th
  - Density: 52.7/sq mi (20.4/km^{2})
- Time zone: UTC−5 (Eastern)
  - Summer (DST): UTC−4 (EDT)
- Area codes: 304, 681
- Congressional district: 2nd
- Senate district: 14th
- House of Delegates district: 83rd, 84th
- Website: https://prestoncountywv.gov/

Preston County is a county located in the U.S. state of West Virginia. As of the 2020 Census, the population was 34,216. Its county seat is Kingwood. The county was formed from Monongalia County in 1818 and named for Virginia Governor James Patton Preston.

Preston County is part of the Morgantown, WV Metropolitan Statistical Area, and is the southernmost county of the Pittsburgh media market. It is the home of The Buckwheat Festival, a county fair known for making buckwheat pancakes.

== History ==
Native Americans lived in (and traveled through) what would one day become Preston County; they crossed-over from the Ohio River watershed, which drains into the Mississippi River, into the Chesapeake Bay watershed. From 1736, European traders and explorers lived in the County, and one boundary stone was laid in 1746—the Fairfax Stone marking the limits of the North Branch of the River. Larger numbers of white settlers began arriving in 1766, with even more coming to the region after the American Revolutionary War. Traveling by foot or horseback, settlers built their own log cabins. Further development followed from 1818, when the National Road was built slightly to the north. When the earliest railroads came, in 1851, all land passed into private ownership, the population increased 70% in a decade, and industrialization truly began.

During the American Civil War, more Preston County men enlisted in Union service than with the Confederacy. There were relatively few slave owners in Preston County, and naturally, few slaves. There were virtually none within a half-hour’s walk from the old Clarksburg-Winchester Road, dated to the late colonial era. The United States Census indicates that Preston County’s all-time slavery peak occurred in 1830, with 125 slaves accounted for, alongside 27 free colored persons.

On June 20, 1863, Preston was one of 50 Virginia counties that were admitted to the Union as the State of West Virginia. Later that year, the counties were divided into civil townships, with the intention of encouraging local government. This proved impractical in the heavily rural state of West Virginia, and the townships were converted into magisterial districts in 1872. Preston County was divided into eight districts: Grant, Kingwood, Lyon, Pleasant, Portland, Reno, Union, and Valley. These remained largely unchanged until the 1990s, when they were consolidated into five new magisterial districts: First, Second, Third, Fourth, and Fifth.

== Geography ==
According to the United States Census Bureau, the county has a total area of 651 square miles (1,690 km^{2}), of which 649 square miles (1,680 km^{2}) is land and 2.6 square miles (6.7 km^{2}) (0.4%) is water.

=== Climate ===
In West Virginia's coldest month of January 1977, Terra Alta in Preston County saw a statewide record snowfall of 104 inches (2.64 m).

The county has a warm-summer humid continental climate (Köppen Dfb). Average monthly temperatures in Kingwood range from 28.7 °F in January to 70.2 °F in July.

=== Major Highways ===
- Interstate 68
- U.S. Highway 50
- U.S. Route 219
- West Virginia Route 7
- West Virginia Route 24
- West Virginia Route 26
- West Virginia Route 72
- West Virginia Route 92

=== Adjacent Counties ===
- Fayette County, Pennsylvania (north)
- Garrett County, Maryland (east)
- Tucker County (south)
- Barbour County (southwest)
- Taylor County (west)
- Monongalia County (northwest)
- Grant County (southeast)

=== National Protected Area ===
- Monongahela National Forest (part)

State parks

- Cathedral State Park (also a Registered National Natural Landmark)
- Fairfax Stone State Park

== Demographics ==
Historical population
Census	Pop.	Note	%±
1820	3,422		—
1830	5,144		50.3%
1840	6,866		33.5%
1850	11,708		70.5%
1860	13,312		13.7%
1870	14,555		9.3%
1880	19,091		31.2%
1890	20,355		6.6%
1900	22,727		11.7%
1910	26,341		15.9%
1920	27,996		6.3%
1930	29,043		3.7%
1940	30,416		4.7%
1950	31,399		3.2%
1960	27,233		−13.3%
1970	25,455		−6.5%
1980	30,460		19.7%
1990	29,037		−4.7%
2000	29,334		1.0%
2010	33,520		14.3%
2020	34,216		2.1%
2025 (est.)	34,004	▼	−0.6%
U.S. Decennial Census; 1790–1960 1900–1990; 1990–2000 2010–2020

=== 2020 Census ===
As of the 2020 census, the county had a population of 34,216. Of the residents, 18.8% were under the age of 18 and 20.0% were 65 years of age or older; the median age was 43.5 years. For every 100 females there were 112.1 males, and for every 100 females age 18 and over there were 112.3 males.

The racial makeup of the county was 90.1% White, 6.0% Black or African American, 0.2% American Indian and Alaska Native, 0.2% Asian, 0.2% from some other race, and 3.3% from two or more races. Hispanic or Latino residents of any race comprised 2.0% of the population.

There were 12,945 households in the county, of which 27.4% had children under the age of 18 living with them and 22.7% had a female householder with no spouse or partner present. About 27.1% of all households were made up of individuals and 13.4% had someone living alone who was 65 years of age or older.

There were 15,174 housing units, of which 14.7% were vacant. Among occupied housing units, 81.1% were owner-occupied and 18.9% were renter-occupied. The homeowner vacancy rate was 1.3% and the rental vacancy rate was 7.7%.

Preston County, West Virginia – Racial and ethnic composition Note: the US Census treats Hispanic/Latino as an ethnic category. This table excludes Latinos from the racial categories and assigns them to a separate category. Hispanics/Latinos may be of any race.
Race / Ethnicity (NH = Non-Hispanic)	Pop 2000	Pop 2010	Pop 2020	% 2000	% 2010	% 2020
White alone (NH)	28,845	32,557	30,348	98.33%	97.13%	88.70%
Black or African American alone (NH)	82	360	2,001	0.28%	1.07%	5.85%
Native American or Alaska Native alone (NH)	27	61	69	0.09%	0.18%	0.20%
Asian alone (NH)	43	48	53	0.15%	0.14%	0.15%
Pacific Islander alone (NH)	5	10	5	0.02%	0.03%	0.01%
Other race alone (NH)	9	13	37	0.03%	0.04%	0.11%
Mixed race or Multiracial (NH)	155	242	1,008	0.53%	0.72%	2.95%
Hispanic or Latino (any race)	168	229	695	0.57%	0.68%	2.03%
Total	29,334	33,520	34,216	100.00%	100.00%	100.00%

=== 2020 American Community Survey ===
According to the 2020 American Community Survey, 56.8% of households were married couples living together, 22.7% had a female householder with no spouse present, and 14.4% had a male householder with no spouse present; the average household and family size was 3.04. The median income for a household was $55,755 and the poverty rate was 14.4%.

=== 2010 Census ===
As of the 2010 United States census, there were 33,520 people, 12,895 households, and 9,038 families residing in the county. The population density was 51.7 inhabitants per square mile (20.0/km^{2}). There were 15,097 housing units at an average density of 23.3 per square mile (9.0/km^{2}). The racial makeup of the county was 97.6% white, 1.1% black or African American, 0.2% American Indian, 0.1% Asian, 0.2% from other races, and 0.8% from two or more races. Those of Hispanic or Latino origin made up 0.7% of the population. In terms of ancestry, 29.4% were German, 14.3% were Irish, 9.5% were American, and 8.9% were English.

Of the 12,895 households, 29.0% had children under the age of 18 living with them, 56.1% were married couples living together, 9.1% had a female householder with no husband present, 29.9% were non-families, and 24.6% of all households were made up of individuals. The average household size was 2.42 and the average family size was 2.84. The median age was 42.0 years.

The age distribution was 19.55% under the age of 18, 7.36% from 18 to 24, 27.58% from 25 to 44, 29.83% from 45 to 64, and 15.68% who were 65 years of age or older. The median age was 42.0 years. For every 100 females, there were 106.63 males. For every 100 females age 18 and over, there were 106.48 males.

The median income for a household in the county was $40,753 and the median income for a family was $46,622. Males had a median income of $38,713 versus $25,808 for females. The per capita income for the county was $19,329. About 10.1% of families and 13.9% of the population were below the poverty line, including 19.0% of those under age 18 and 9.9% of those age 65 or over.

== Politics and Government ==
=== Federal Politics ===
Preston County lies within West Virginia's 2nd congressional district. The current representative of the district is Riley Moore (R).

Generally speaking, most of the State of West Virginia became a Republican bastion in the 21st century, after having leaned heavily Democratic between the New Deal and Bill Clinton. However, Preston County has seemingly always been a Republican stronghold, if not quite as ‘rock-ribbed’ as its neighbor, Grant County, or nearby Garrett County, Maryland, two counties that have historically never voted for a Democrat in the post-Civil War years. Preston County has, by comparison, voted Democratic on at least one occasion, during Lyndon Johnson’s 1964 landslide election; however, Johnson's win over Barry Goldwater was much more decisive than his narrow victory in analogous Upshur County, and Bill Clinton came within 20 votes in 1996.

Voter registration and party enrollment in Preston County
Party	Total	Percentage
Democratic	4,302	22.25%
Republican	10,264	53.10%
Independents, unaffiliated, and other	4,765	24.65%
Total	19,371	100.00%

United States presidential election results for Preston County, West Virginia
Year	Republican		Democratic		Third party(ies)	
Year	No.	%	No.	%	No.	%
1912	1,461	24.70%	1,845	31.20%	2,608	44.10%
1916	3,838	68.09%	1,694	30.05%	105	1.86%
1920	6,729	74.73%	2,150	23.88%	125	1.39%
1924	6,396	68.22%	2,445	26.08%	534	5.70%
1928	7,783	76.18%	2,355	23.05%	78	0.76%
1932	6,359	56.05%	4,872	42.94%	115	1.01%
1936	7,553	58.11%	5,410	41.62%	34	0.26%
1940	8,213	63.46%	4,730	36.54%	0	0.00%
1944	6,785	69.36%	2,997	30.64%	0	0.00%
1948	6,020	62.73%	3,527	36.75%	49	0.51%
1952	8,059	65.32%	4,278	34.68%	0	0.00%
1956	7,953	70.27%	3,365	29.73%	0	0.00%
1960	6,908	62.07%	4,221	37.93%	0	0.00%
1964	4,015	39.06%	6,264	60.94%	0	0.00%
1968	5,636	55.16%	4,020	39.35%	561	5.49%
1972	7,807	72.39%	2,977	27.61%	0	0.00%
1976	5,719	50.55%	5,595	49.45%	0	0.00%
1980	5,828	54.23%	4,317	40.17%	601	5.59%
1984	6,955	63.05%	4,054	36.75%	22	0.20%
1988	5,804	56.92%	4,357	42.73%	35	0.34%
1992	4,429	42.20%	3,933	37.47%	2,133	20.32%
1996	4,257	41.31%	4,237	41.11%	1,812	17.58%
2000	6,607	63.29%	3,515	33.67%	317	3.04%
2004	7,855	65.85%	3,963	33.22%	111	0.93%
2008	7,325	62.10%	4,205	35.65%	266	2.26%
2012	7,889	70.54%	2,931	26.21%	363	3.25%
2016	9,538	74.73%	2,470	19.35%	756	5.92%
2020	11,190	76.79%	3,163	21.70%	220	1.51%
2024	11,176	77.47%	2,953	20.47%	297	2.06%

=== State Government ===
Preston County is represented by two Senators in the West Virginia Senate. Senate members Jay Taylor (R), and Randy Smith (R) both serve in West Virginia's 14th Senate district. The county is also represented in the West Virginia House of Delegates by two Delegates. The Delegates for Preston County are George Street (R) for district 83 and D. Rolland Jennings (R) for district 84.

=== Judicial Government ===
Preston County was combined with Tucker County, West Virginia in 2025 to create the new 22nd Judicial Circuit. There are currently two circuit judges in the 22nd Circuit: Chief Judge, Steven L. Shaffer, who was originally elected in 2018 and reelected in 2024 and Judge, Hilary M. Bright, who was elected in 2024. Since 2016, judicial elections in West Virginia have been nonpartisan.

=== County Government ===
Preston County is governed by a county commission. The Commission is made up of the Commission President and Commissioners who wield administrative/executive powers of the county's government. Don Smith (R), elected in 2014 and reelected in 2020, is the current President of the County Commission. The Preston County Commission consists of two other members. The current other members of the County Commission are Samantha Stone (R), elected in 2018 and Hunter Thomas (R), elected in 2022. The county government also consists of the Prosecuting Attorney of Preston County, James E. Shay, Jr. (R), elected in 2020; Sheriff, Scott Spiker (R), elected in 2024; Assessor, David Nestor (R), elected in 2024; County Clerk, David Sypolt (R), appointed in 2025; and Circuit Clerk, Lisa Leishman (R), appointed in 2020 and elected in 2022.

== Communities ==
=== City ===
- Kingwood (county seat)

=== Towns ===
- Albright
- Brandonville
- Bruceton Mills
- Masontown
- Newburg
- Reedsville
- Rowlesburg
- Terra Alta
- Tunnelton

=== Magisterial districts ===
==== Current ====
- First
- Second
- Third
- Fourth
- Fifth

==== Historic ====
- Grant
- Kingwood
- Lyon
- Pleasant
- Portland
- Reno
- Union
- Valley

=== Census-designated place ===
- Arthurdale
- Aurora

=== Unincorporated communities ===
- Afton
- Alpine Lake
- Amboy
- Austen
- Borgman
- Bretz
- Bull Run
- Cascade
- Clifton Mills
- Colebank
- Corinth
- Cuzzart
- Denver
- Eglon
- Etam
- Evansville
- Fellowsville
- Gladefarms
- Hardman (partial)
- Hazelton
- Herring
- Hopemont
- Hopewell
- Horse Shoe Run
- Howesville
- Independence
- Lenox
- Little Sandy
- Manheim
- Macomber
- Manown
- Marquess
- Mount Olivet
- Mount Vernon
- Orr
- Pisgah
- Pleasantdale
- Preston
- Rockville
- Rodemer
- Rohr
- Ruthbelle
- Saint Joe
- Scotch Hill
- Sell
- Silver Lake
- Sinclair
- Snider
- Stevensburg
- Sugar Valley
- Thornton
- Threefork Bridge
- Turner Douglass
- Valley Point
- Victoria
- West End
- White Oak Springs
- Zevely

== See also ==
- Preston County Schools
- Briery Mountain Wildlife Management Area
- National Register of Historic Places listings in Preston County, West Virginia
- Maryland v. West Virginia
- Snake Hill Wildlife Management Area
- Upper Decker's Creek Wildlife Management Area
