= East Palestine, Ohio, train derailment =

2023 disaster in Ohio, United States

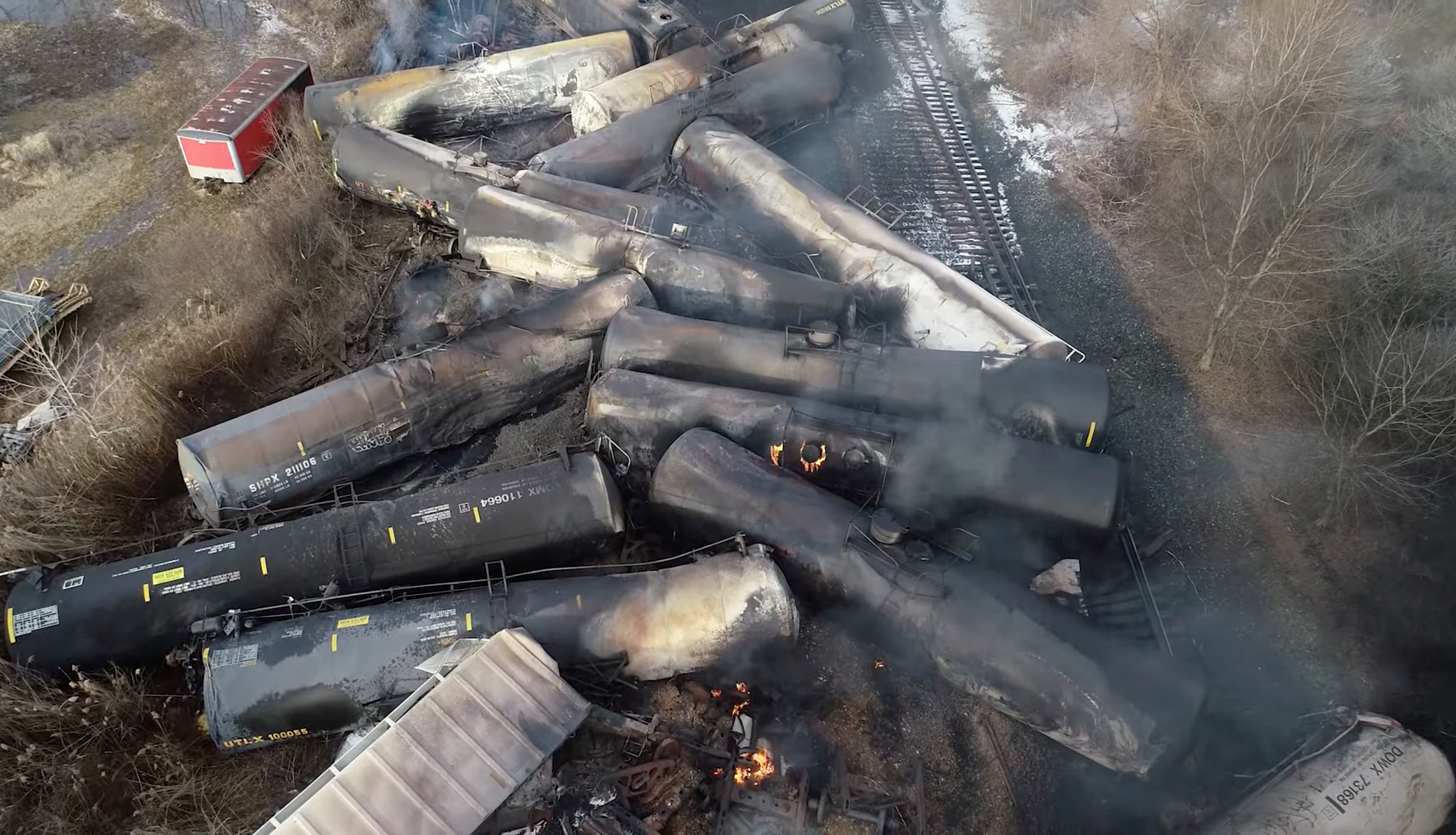
- Drone footage of the wrecked train
- Location of the derailment

Details
- Date: February 3, 2023; 3 years ago 8:55 p.m. EST (UTC−5)
- Location: East Palestine, Ohio
- Coordinates: 40.8360°N 80.5227°W
- Country: United States
- Operator: Norfolk Southern
- Incident type: Derailment
- Cause: Defective wheel bearing that overheated

Statistics
- Injured: 7 from initial derailment, an unknown number from exposure to atmospheric toxins

On February 3, 2023, at 8:55 p.m. EST (UTC−5), a Norfolk Southern freight train derailed in East Palestine, Ohio, United States. The train was carrying hazardous materials when 38 cars derailed. Several railcars burned for more than two days and emergency crews also conducted controlled burns of several railcars, which released hydrogen chloride and phosgene into the air. Residents within a 1-mile (1.6-kilometer) radius were evacuated. Agencies from Ohio, Pennsylvania, West Virginia, and Virginia assisted in the emergency response.

Following the derailment, reaction and commentary focused on industry working conditions and safety concerns, including: the lack of modern brake safety regulations, the implementation of precision scheduled railroading (PSR), reduced railway workers per train, and increased train lengths and weight. Critics said train companies had failed to invest in maintenance to prevent accidents, even though they conduct stock buybacks.

Several unions and consumer organizations expressed concern about private ownership of railways and a "profit-driven approach", which they said puts workers and communities at high risk. The United Electrical, Radio and Machine Workers of America (UE) also called for public ownership of the US railway systems.

Major US railroads promised to overhaul safety in the industry as a direct result of the East Palestine disaster. Although the number of derailments rose in the top five freight railroads in 2023, Norfolk Southern was the only railroad among the five to report a decline in accidents in that period. A group of the railroads also promised to enroll in the Federal Railroad Administration's "close-call incident reporting system." NS was the first to join the system, with BNSF joining a few months later.

In June 2024, the National Transportation Safety Board held a meeting in East Palestine to review its findings on the incident. The board voted unanimously to accept the findings and announced it would issue a report. Norfolk Southern announced it had endorsed the agency's recommendations.

By October 2023, Norfolk Southern removed more than 167,000 tons of contaminated soil and more than 39 million U.S. gallons (150 million liters) of tainted water from the derailment site.

As of February 2025, Norfolk Southern had committed more than $115 million to East Palestine, including $25 million for a regional safety training center and $25 million in planned improvements to East Palestine's park. The regional safety training center was removed from the settlement in January 2025. The company also paid $22.21 million directly to residents.

In January 2025, East Palestine and Norfolk Southern reached a $22 million settlement. The settlement was to fund village priorities related to the derailment, and acknowledged the $13.5 million Norfolk Southern had already paid for water treatment upgrades and new police and fire equipment. It also reaffirmed Norfolk Southern's $25 million commitment to ongoing improvements at East Palestine City Park, separate from the settlement. On February 3, 2025, a lawsuit alleged that at least seven people, including a one-week-old infant, died as a result of the toxic chemicals leak.

== Background ==
The train that derailed was Norfolk Southern 32N, operating from the Terminal Railroad Association of St. Louis yard in Madison, Illinois, to Norfolk Southern's Conway Yard in Conway, Pennsylvania, on the Fort Wayne Line. Aboard the 9,300-foot-long (1.76 mi; 2.8 km) train were an engineer, conductor, and conductor trainee.

The train consisted of three General Electric AC44C6M locomotives (Nos. 4178 and 4224 on the head-end and No. 4412 in the middle acting as distributed power), 141 loaded cars and nine empty cars. Other reports note one more car, for a total of 151 cars, weighing 18,000 tons. Of those cars, 20 were carrying hazardous materials, including chloroethene (vinyl chloride), butyl acrylate, 2-ethylhexyl acrylate, ethylene glycol monobutyl ether, isobutylene, combustible liquids, and benzene residue. The train departed Madison on February 1, and had suffered at least one mechanical failure before the derailment.

== Derailment ==
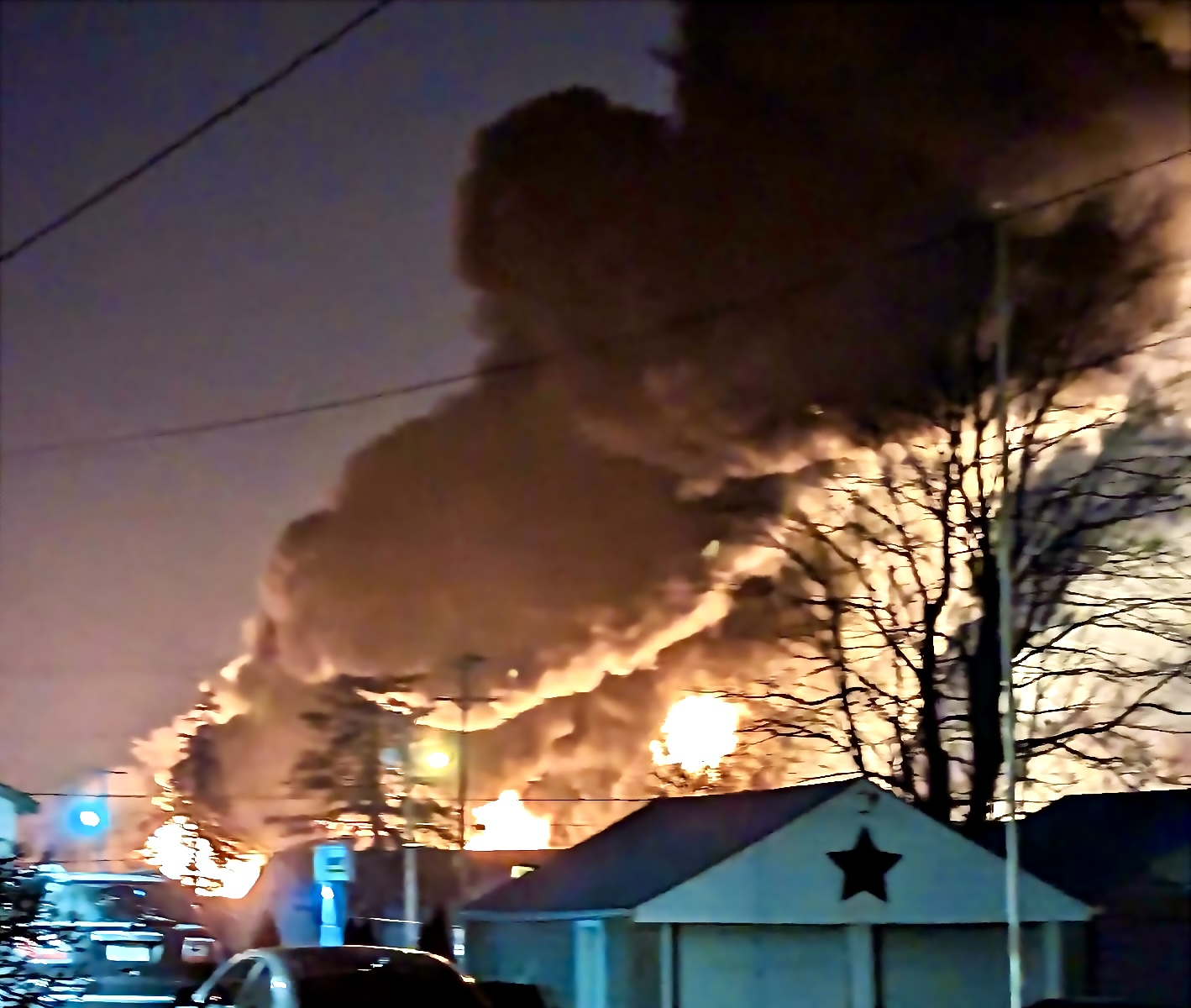
Smoke rises from the derailment pile on February 3

Video of smoke and fire

Security footage from a business in Salem, Ohio (20 miles [32 km] northwest of East Palestine), and a Ring doorbell camera from New Waterford, Ohio (4 miles [6 km] northwest from East Palestine), show fire emanating from underneath a rail car as it went by on the tracks. After this, at around 8:55 pm EST on February 3, 2023, 38 cars derailed on the east side of East Palestine, near the border with Pennsylvania. Of the 38 derailed cars, 11 were tank cars that dumped 100,000 US gallons (380,000 L) of hazardous materials, including vinyl chloride, benzene residue, and butyl acrylate.

List of derailed cars carrying high-hazard chemicals
Line #	Car ID	Capacity	Contents	Hazard class
28	TILX 402025	25,800 US gallons (98,000 L)	Vinyl chloride (stabilized)	2.1 (flammable gas)
29	OCPX 80235	25,800 US gallons (98,000 L)	Vinyl chloride (stabilized)	2.1 (flammable gas)
30	OCPX 80179	25,800 US gallons (98,000 L)	Vinyl chloride (stabilized)	2.1 (flammable gas)
31	GATX 95098	25,800 US gallons (98,000 L)	Vinyl chloride (stabilized)	2.1 (flammable gas)
36	SHPX 211226	30,110 US gallons (114,000 L)	2-Butoxyethanol	Combustible liquid
38	DOWX 73168	25,800 US gallons (98,000 L)	2-Ethylhexyl acrylate	Combustible liquid
49	NATX 35844	30,110 US gallons (114,000 L)	Isobutylene	2.1 (flammable gas)
50	UTLX 205907	30,110 US gallons (114,000 L)	Butyl acrylate (stabilized)	3 (flammable liquid)
55	OCPX 80370	25,800 US gallons (98,000 L)	Vinyl chloride (stabilized)	2.1 (flammable gas)
56	DPRX 259013	30,110 US gallons (114,000 L)	Benzene	3 (flammable liquid)
60	DPRX 258671	30,110 US gallons (114,000 L)	Benzene	3 (flammable liquid)

About 48 hours later, the National Transportation Safety Board (NTSB) released preliminary findings indicating that the derailment was caused by a mechanical problem on one of the railcars' trucks, which may be connected to reports that an axle was observed throwing sparks about an hour before. The crew received an alarm from a wayside defect detector shortly before the derailment indicating a mechanical problem, and then an emergency brake application was initiated.

== Emergency response and burn off ==
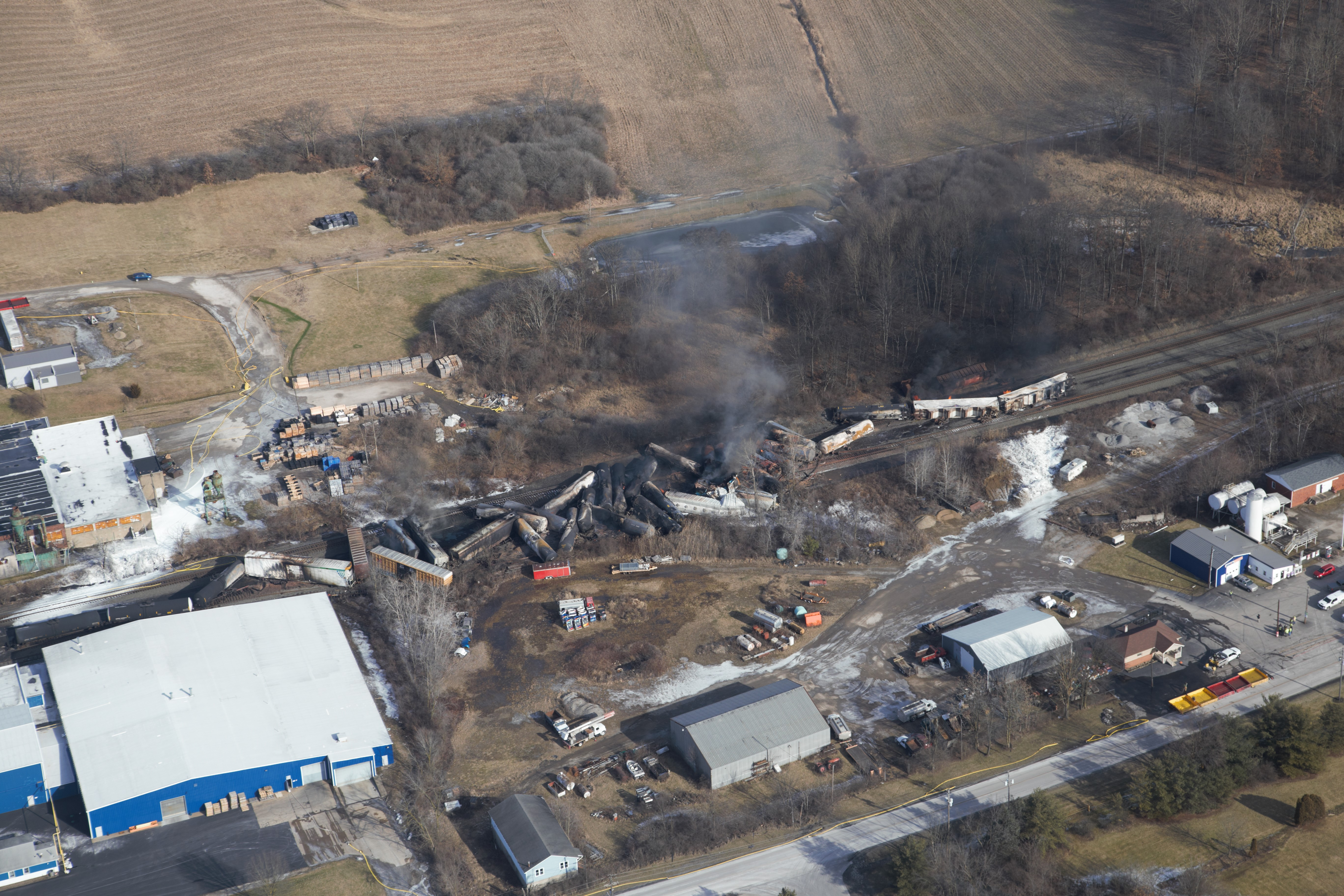
The crash site on February 5

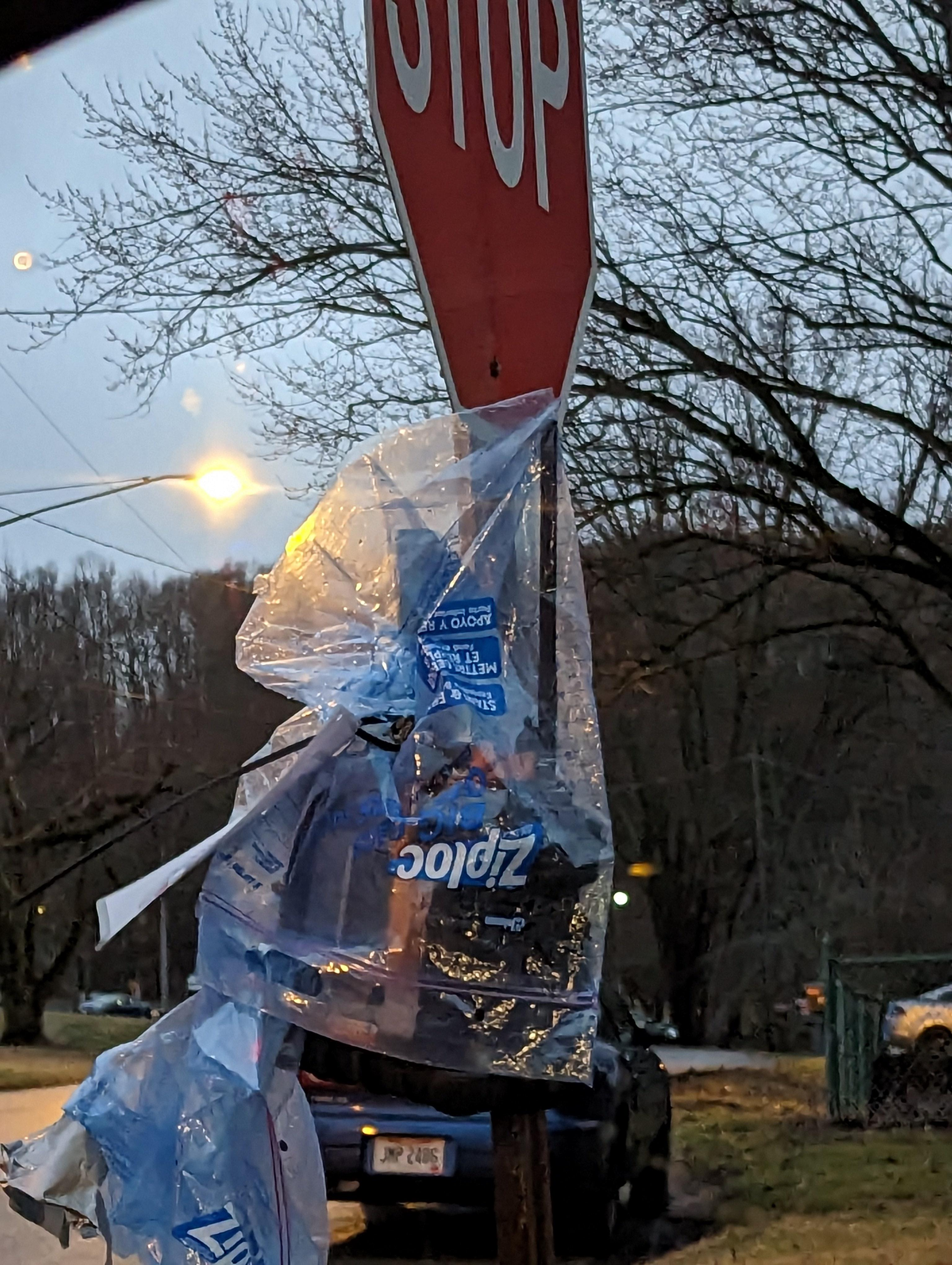
Air monitoring device

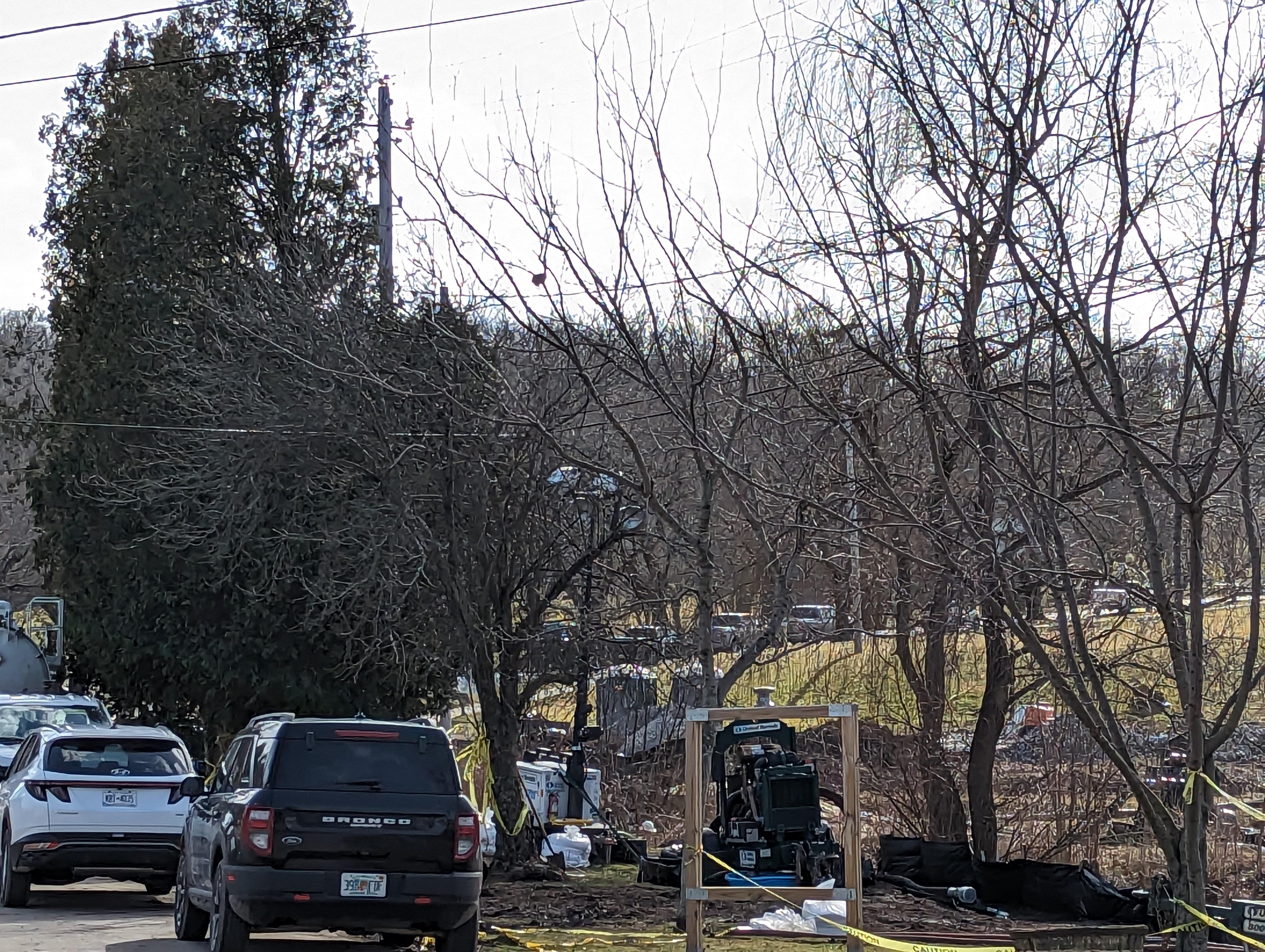
Workers digging up a creek and filtering the water at the entrance to a park

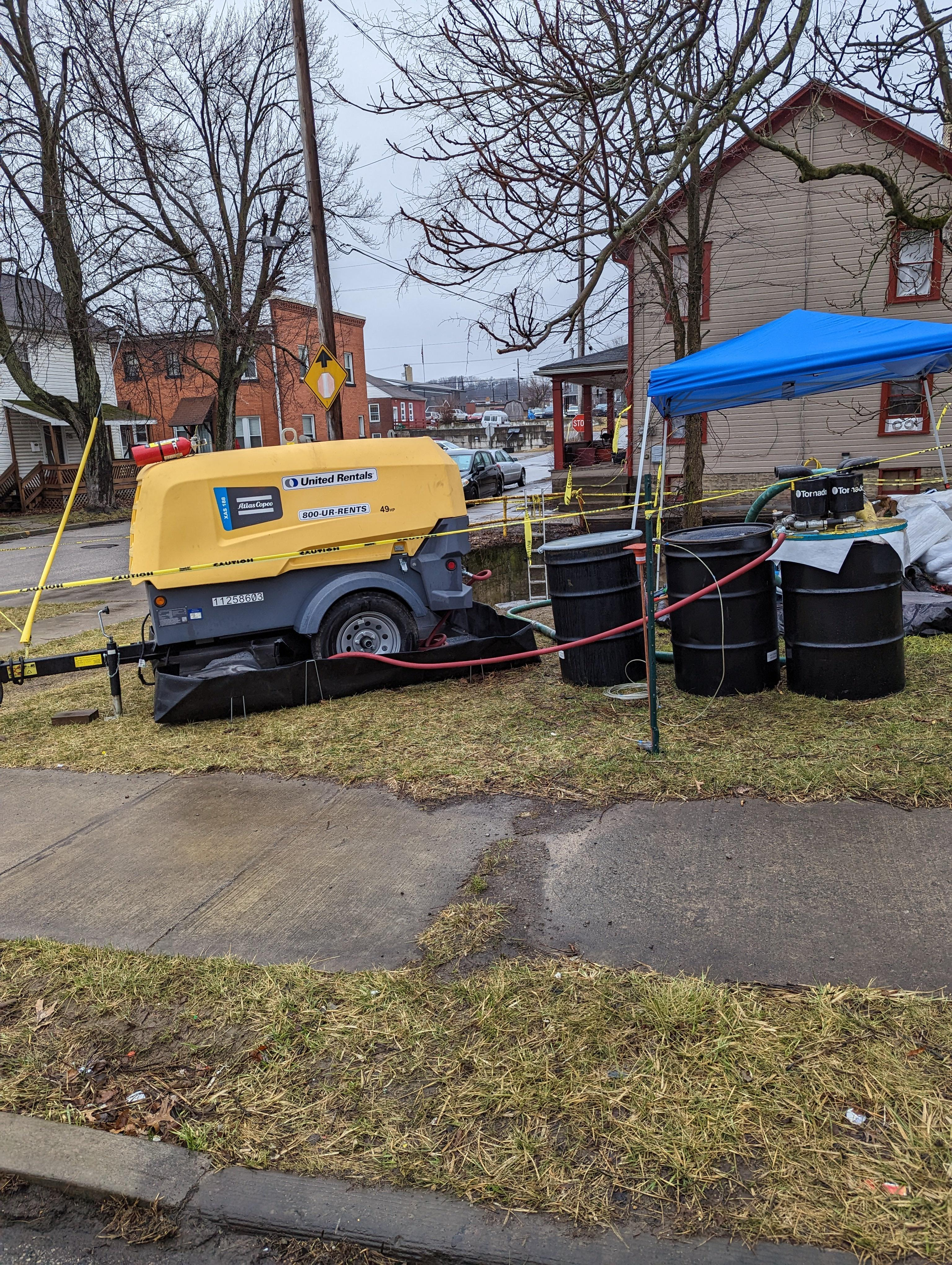
Cleanup of a small creek

Nearly 70 emergency agencies from Ohio, West Virginia, and Pennsylvania mobilized in response. East Palestine Mayor Trent Conaway declared a state of emergency.

Norfolk Southern personnel were first to respond on February 3. On February 4, they noticed water spillage into Sulphur Run and Leslie Run, and installed booms and underflow dams to separate the floating pollutant. The U.S. Environmental Protection Agency (EPA) and Norfolk Southern began monitoring air quality on February 3. According to the EPA, humans can smell butyl acrylate at a concentration lower than the screening level (exposure limit). The National Institute for Occupational Safety and Health (NIOSH) recommended exposure limit for butyl acrylate is a time-weighted average of 10 ppm (55 mg/m^{3}).

On February 5, a temperature change in one of the train cars caused fears of an explosion with the potential to disperse shrapnel as the fires continued to burn. Although five cars containing vinyl chloride remained intact following the crash, the relief valve on one of the cars had malfunctioned. Ohio Governor Mike DeWine activated the Ohio National Guard to assist local authorities in what he called "a matter of life and death". Pennsylvania Governor Josh Shapiro ordered an evacuation in areas of Beaver County which bordered the site. Officials in both states went door-to-door to evacuate residents. The fire from the accident burned until February 5. A Civil Emergency Message was issued by the National Weather Service in Pittsburgh, PA at 10:10 PM for Columbiana County, Ohio.

On February 6, DeWine and Shapiro ordered the mandatory evacuation of all residents within a 1-by-2-mile (1.6 by 3.2 km) area. In an effort to prevent further explosions, Norfolk Southern emergency crews, at the direction of Unified Command under the East Palestine fire chief, conducted a controlled release and burn of the five tanks of vinyl chloride into the air. The EPA was consulted in the decision to vent and burn. Small shaped charges were used to breach the tank cars, and the vinyl chloride was allowed to flow into a trench, where it was ignited by flares. The burn caused black clouds to form above the area, and released phosgene and hydrogen chloride into the air. Although officials reported that air quality readings were not showing anything concerning, residents in nearby Mahoning and Trumbull counties reported a chemical smell in their areas. Officials in the Youngstown region advised residents to stay indoors. Air monitoring conducted on February 7–8 revealed an increase in volatile organic compounds (VOCs) in the air below the screening level and an increase in particulate matter, probably from the soot.

On February 8, state and federal EPA workers noticed oily spillage on the soil and notified Norfolk Southern, which began removing it with a vacuum truck.

On the evening of February 8, Norfolk Southern resumed traffic through the town. East Palestine Mayor Trent Conaway said that he was displeased because the railroad had said that trains would not run again until all residents were able to return to their homes. On the morning of February 10, Amtrak's Capitol Limited resumed passing through East Palestine.

The evacuation was lifted on February 9 after the EPA reported that the air inside and outside the evacuation zone had returned to normal levels. Although toxicants were detected at the derailment site, they were not detected outside the area. The Ohio EPA also reported that drinking water (sourced from different waterways) was safe. In a testing report from February 8, the Ohio EPA showed WKBN-TV that vinyl chloride, benzene, some chlorinated organic compounds, and other VOCs were not detected in the water. As of January 2024, Norfolk Southern has committed $4.3 million to provide enhanced filtration to East Palestine's drinking water.

Toxic chemicals were borne into the atmosphere as they polluted the air in 16 states, 540,000 square miles (1,400,000 km^{2}), 14% of the US, according to a 2024 study from the National Atmospheric Deposition Program, at the University of Wisconsin–Madison. High concentrations of chloride were discovered in Virginia, South Carolina and Wisconsin with the highest concentrations on the Canada-New York border, downwind of East Palestine. Most of the chemicals had dissipated after two to three weeks. The study also showed unforeseen high pH levels and unusually high levels of base cations. Both measurements were greater than the 99th percentile vs. historic levels.

=== Burnoff unnecessary ===
In February 2024, Jennifer Homendy, the chair of the National Transportation Safety Board (NTSB), testified before the US Senate Committee on Commerce, Science and Transportation (SCCST) that the controlled release and burn of vinyl chloride was not necessary. Homendy stated that the decision-makers relied on contractors who were alarmed by the limited temperature readings they were able to get, combined with the violent way one of the tank cars released vinyl chloride with a roar from a pressure release valve after hours of calm. However, Homendy also stated that OxyVinyls, the company that manufactured and was shipping the volatile chemicals, did not believe polymerization was occurring. During the NTSB field hearing in June 2023, OxyVinyl's on-scene expert testified he had said he at one point believed polymerization could be occurring. DeWine was not made aware that officials from OxyVinyls were at the scene of the derailment. Norfolk Southern and their clean-up contractors testified that their rationale for the burn was the belief that polymerization of the vinyl chloride was imminent; this required quickly increasing ambient temperature and an oxygen infusion – neither of which occurred. The motivation in conducting the controlled release was to prevent an uncontrolled explosion. Officials from OxyVinyl, also involved in litigation from the incident, testified that the temperature in the derailed tank cars was descending, no deadly chemical reaction was occurring, so the controlled burn was unnecessary. The cars could have been left to cool down. NS maintains that OxyVinyls' opinion was not clear and conflicting, and contradicted previous literature the company had published. The smoke and residue of the burning chemicals have concerned local citizens about long-term health ramifications. Both Ohio senators reacted to Homendy's announcement. JD Vance wondered why the unnecessary burnoff was rushed and suggested Norfolk Southern wanted to open the rail line and move freight again. Sherrod Brown said the burnoff provided proof that Norfolk Southern considered profit more than safety. Data collected by the U.S. EPA, Norfolk Southern, and independent scientists have indicated the air is safe. The NTSB announced its final findings on the cause of the accident at a board meeting on June 25, 2024, at East Palestine High School. This was the second time the full board of the NTSB visited East Palestine. The first was in the summer of 2023.

== Health and environmental concerns ==
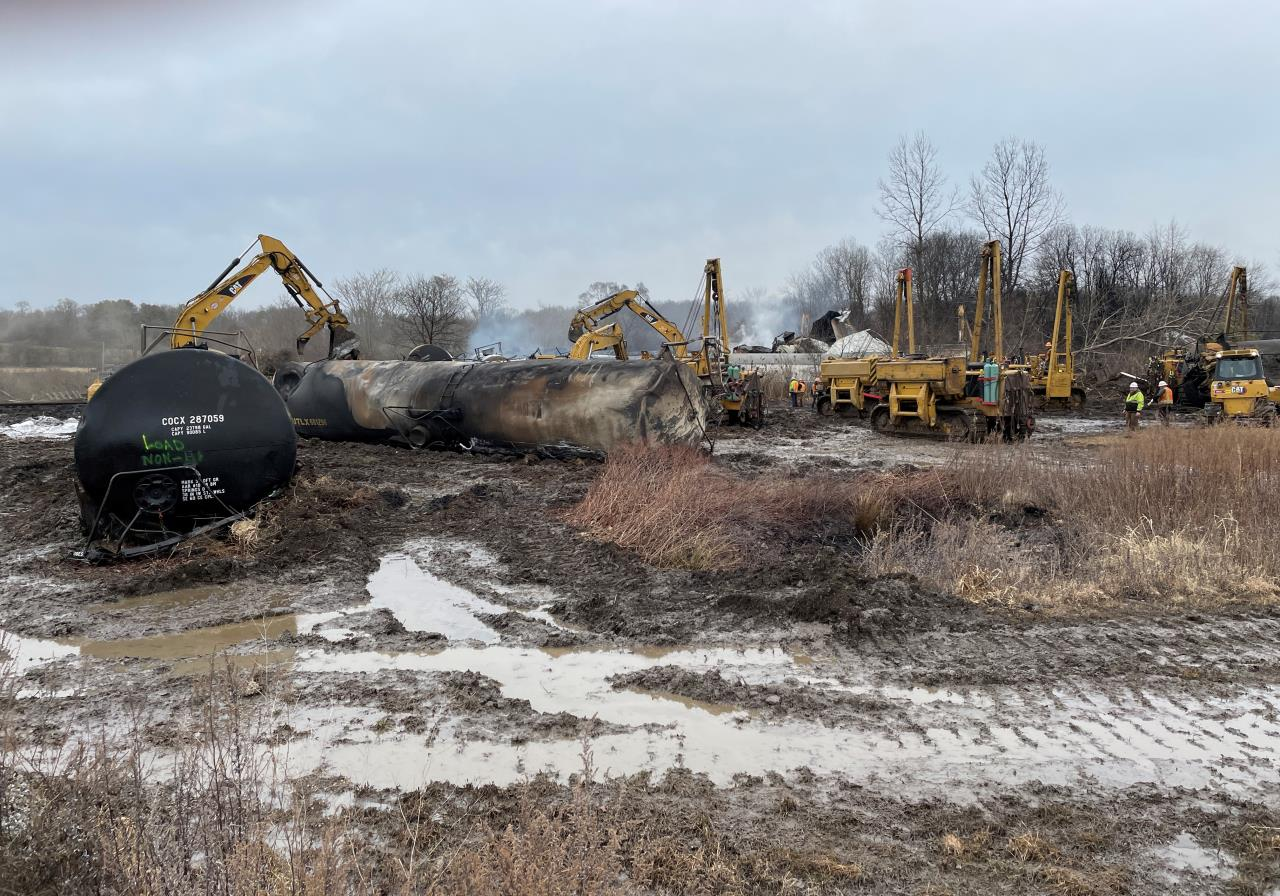
Norfolk Southern contractors during cleanup operations at the crash site on February 7

The Ohio Department of Natural Resources stated the chemical spill killed an estimated 3,500 small fish across 7.5 mi (12 km) of streams as of February 8. A later estimate put the number of minnows at 38,222, with other species of animals at 5,500, totaling 43,222. Several captive foxes at Parker Dairy became sick over the following weekend, and one died, which its owner attributed to the derailment. Material from the crash was observed in storm drains and detected in samples from Sulphur Run, Leslie Run, Bull Creek, North Fork Little Beaver Creek, Little Beaver Creek, and the Ohio River. An oily product was seen seeping into the soil. Emergency response staff are assessing potential impacts on aquatic life. On February 23, Mary Mertz, director of the Ohio Department of Natural Resources, stated that the derailment potentially killed more than 43,000 fish, crustaceans, amphibians and other marine animals. State officials said on February 23 that they have not seen deaths or other negative effects on animals living on the land. However, residents report that pets and animals as far as 10 miles (16 km) from the derailment site died overnight during the controlled release of vinyl chloride. In late March, CBS News reported that inhabitants have continued to experience health symptoms, despite officials asserting that no harmful chemicals were detected in the air or water. Employees of the CDC who investigated the derailment in early March also experienced symptoms.

Neil Donahue, a chemistry professor at Carnegie Mellon University (CMU), expressed concern about the potential production of dioxins during the burning of vinyl chloride, while Lynn Goldman, dean of the Milken Institute School of Public Health, worried more about residual vinyl chloride. Gaseous pollutants dissipate quickly in the air, but dioxins are persistent.

William M. Diesslin, board chair of the Institute of Hazardous Materials Management, suggested that burning vinyl chloride was "the lesser of two evils", from reading from the emergency response guide and from safety data sheets. DeWine's press secretary defended the decision months later.

The Guardian reported, quoting a police officer who presented at the incident: "We were never told about the cargo on the train and we were never told to wear protective clothing, although it did not matter because our personal protective equipment (PPE) dates back to 2010."

In early March 2023, seven investigators from the Centers for Disease Control and Prevention, including some from the Epidemic Intelligence Service, fell sick when inspecting the crash site, with symptoms matching those of East Palestine residents.

In summer 2023, the cleanup efforts continued as contractors had removed 25,000,000 gallons of contaminated water and 80,000 tons of tainted soil without a plan for cleaning up Sulphur Run, a creek that runs through downtown.

In June 2024, an analysis of precipitation and pollution data from rain and snow samples by the National Atmospheric Deposition Program revealed that "extreme concentrations of multiple pollutants", including chloride, and "exceptionally high" pH levels relative to historical levels were present over a widespread area, suggesting an area of impact from the accident and subsequent fire covering 1.4 million km^{2} and including portions of 16 US states (and likely Canada, for which data was not available).

In early 2025, ongoing site sampling by Norfolk Southern, under EPA oversight, detected low levels of 2-butoxyethanol and other chemicals east of the derailment site. Targeted soil excavations were planned to address the issue. The EPA also approved a plan for groundwater monitoring and helping further mitigate contamination in the derailment cleanup area.

=== Waste disposal ===
Officials in Michigan expressed disappointment that contaminated soil had been disposed of in southeast Michigan without their knowledge, while officials in Texas likewise acknowledged that they were only officially informed of waste water disposal from the derailment in Texas via an announcement on DeWine's website.

On February 26, a protest against the imported waste shipments was held in Romulus, Michigan, near one of the two EPA-approved waste disposal sites within the state of Michigan.

=== Independent testing ===
Researchers from multiple universities entered the impact area to conduct environmental sampling in February 2023. Results of the Texas A&M and a Carnegie Mellon University (CMU) investigation indicated chemical levels in the air above long-term exposure limits. In particular, 1,1,2-trichloroethane, 1,3-butadiene, acrolein, benzene, m-,p-,o-xylenes, naphthalene, trichloroethylene, and vinyl chloride were detected. An associate professor from CMU, Albert Presto, said that acrolein was a cause for continuing research because of potential risk. The presence of acrolein was found in some parts of East Palestine at levels as found in other American cities such as Pittsburgh. Acrolein was not listed in the chemicals that Norfolk Southern indicated were transported in the railcars; however, it can be produced by the combustion of fuel, wood and plastics.

The measuring technique by the CMU and Texas A&M researchers is by mobile lab in a van that draws in air above the van driver's head as it travels at low speed. The van is part of CMU's Center for Atmospheric Particle Studies. The van made measurements every ten feet as it drove through East Palestine. The testing unit can measure particles every second and can identify minuscule concentrations in parts per billion.

A Purdue University team collaborated with residents and a community group formed after the disaster called United for East Palestine. The Purdue University team was onsite from February 25 to 27, 2023 meeting with residents, as well as collecting creek and home drinking water samples. After visiting the site, the researchers called for warnings to be issued to the public about the acute risk posed by the heavily contaminated creeks. On March 1, USEPA Administrator Michael Regan publicly advised residents to stay away from the creeks. Also found by the team was that some private drinking water well owners had called the Columbiana Health Department multiple days multiple times to have their well tested, but the Health Department had not called them back. Results of the Purdue University studies will be released on their website.

=== Whistleblower and cover-up allegations ===
An EPA whistleblower alleged that the EPA covered up evidence of toxic chemicals by intentionally delaying the deployment of chemical-sensing aircraft and turning off chemical sensors. The EPA maintains that the allegations are false. According to the whistleblower, the EPA hid its misconduct from FOIA requests by falsifying records and instructing staff to omit keywords in order to evade in an FOIA search.

The whistleblower, Robert Kroutil, was a senior scientist managing the deployment of ASPECT aircraft that scanned the area for toxic chemicals. According to Kroutil, he was instructed to neglect scanning critical areas of concern. When the plane flew over contaminated creeks, he was instructed to turn off chemical-sensing equipment, a request that Kroutil characterized as highly unusual and against standard procedure. He was also asked to falsely backdate new procedures, written weeks after the chemical sensing mission. Kroutil continued to allege the EPA delayed the procedure by deploying aircraft several days after the derailment, while other deployments had occurred within hours.

== Aftermath ==
Immediately following the derailment, Norfolk Southern implemented a new six-point safety plan based on recommendations from an independent safety consultant.

On February 14, DeWine told reporters that he was not seeing any problems in the area after the controlled release of chemicals and that President Joe Biden had offered federal assistance but DeWine said that no further assistance was necessary.

A town hall meeting was held on February 15 between residents and local, state, and federal officials. Norfolk Southern representatives declined to attend due to a perceived physical threat. Some residents expressed distrust in the company and government. In late February 2023, Norfolk Southern CEO Alan Shaw visited East Palestine and spoke with local officials, first responders and NS employees residing in the region. He promised that Norfolk Southern is “…here to stay” until East Palestine is “…made whole.”

On February 16, DeWine released a statement saying after speaking with the White House, he requested more aid from the U.S. Department of Health and Human Services (HHS), the Health and Emergency Response Team (HERT), and the Centers for Disease Control and Prevention (CDC). DeWine also said his office had been informed by the Federal Emergency Management Agency (FEMA) that it was not eligible for FEMA assistance. He said during a press conference on February 17, "Although FEMA is synonymous with disaster support, they're most typically involved with disasters where there is tremendous home or property damage," such as tornadoes, flooding, or hurricanes. Biden's spokesperson said FEMA was supporting the other agencies which were better matched to this type of disaster.

On February 16, Sherrod Brown, senior senator of Ohio, visited East Palestine, met with EPA Head Regan and met with residents and first responders. He sent a letter to Governor DeWine, asking him to declare a state of emergency and to seek full federal support in cleanup efforts. He also sent letters to the NTSB and the EPA, calling on them to investigate the accident and to provide assistance in the area. On the following Sunday, February 19, when interviewed, Brown said that residents were "right to be skeptical". He said that Norfolk Southern should go beyond giving a $1,000 payment to every resident in the city. Brown said that the company should abide by its pledge to "make everybody whole".

On February 16, the Environmental Protection Agency administrator Michael S. Regan visited the scene to provide assistance. The EPA faced criticism for delays in testing for dioxins following the derailment.

As of October 2023, Norfolk Southern has removed more than 167,000 tons of contaminated soil and more than 39 million gallons of tainted water from the derailment site. On October 26, the EPA announced that major cleanup activities were completed. The EPA said soil confirmation sampling will continue to ensure all contaminants are gone. Norfolk Southern will continue to conduct additional cleanup and investigations at two creeks that run through East Palestine.

Health teams from the CDC and HHS were expected to arrive as early as February 20.

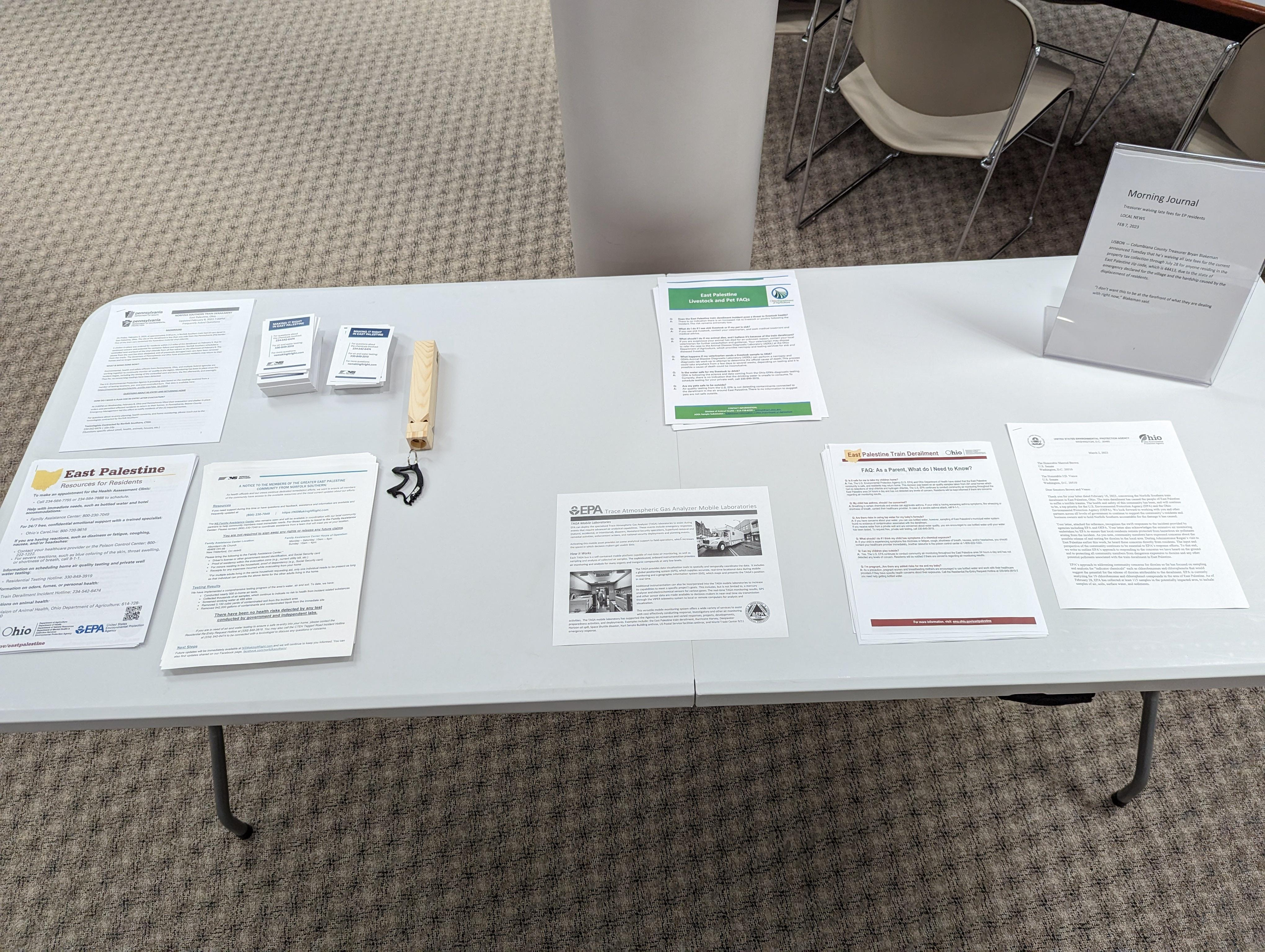
A table set up at the East Palestine Memorial Public Library on February 27

Former President Donald Trump visited East Palestine on February 22, giving a speech half a mile away from the wreckage in which he criticized the federal response to the disaster and offered relief. Trump provided thousands of bottles of "Trump Spring Water" for the community, walked through East Palestine, flanked by his son Donald Trump Jr. and Ohio Senator (future Vice President to Donald Trump) JD Vance, and then visited a local McDonald's to purchase food for the first responders.

On the evening of February 22, Governor DeWine, EPA Administrator Regan and Norfolk Southern CEO Alan Shaw appeared at a CNN town hall in East Palestine. Shaw apologized to the community's residents. "I'm terribly sorry for what has happened to your community." He added, "I want you to know that Norfolk Southern is here, and we're going to stay here. And we're going to make this right."

Giant Eagle announced on February 22, they would temporarily suspend the sale and product distribution of Salineville, Ohio sourced spring water. Spokesperson Dan Donovan, said, "[the company is] operating out of an abundance of caution," also mentioning, "[their water comes from] a protected spring located at a higher elevation than East Palestine and is not near groundwater sources directly impacted by the incident," adding that, "A third-party lab has been testing Salineville's raw water sources and finished products and "has not found any evidence" that the water was negatively impacted by the derailment."

On February 27, Senator Brown made a return trip to East Palestine, held a town hall and met with residents and business owners. In a press briefing afterward he promoted additional regulations for railcars to ensure that this sort of accident would not recur. He added, "I want to see rail safety legislation passed in the next few weeks."

On March 5, 2023, a local music group, The Conkle Brothers, partnered with the Brightside Project (a non-profit in Salem, Ohio), to put on a local music benefit for the residents of East Palestine featuring 20 local musicians and raising over $7,000.

Norfolk Southern has hired around 1,600 new employees over two years, including many conductors and engineers. The company has begun installing additional hot-box detectors, which can detect the kind of malfunction that led to the accident, including detectors on each side of East Palestine. The increased emphasis on safety has resulted in a 40% decrease in main line derailments in 2023.

=== Lawsuits and compensation ===
On February 8, affected businesses and residents filed three class action lawsuits against Norfolk Southern Railway. One demands the company to pay for the medical screenings and treatments of people living within a 30 mi (48 km) radius of the derailment. Norfolk Southern Railway offered $1,000 payments to locals to "cover costs related to the evacuation". Some residents expressed concerns that taking these payouts would limit their ability to join future legal actions.

On February 4, Norfolk Southern donated $25,000 to the Red Cross to support its efforts in East Palestine. On February 14, the company pledged a $1 million "community support fund", and free chemical testing of air, water, and soil. On February 16, the support fund was increased to $2.5 million.

On February 21, the EPA ordered Norfolk Southern to find and clean contaminated water and soil, and to pay for the EPA's own cleaning efforts. Norfolk Southern continues to backfill in excavated areas and assess chemical contamination in the area's creeks. Regional EPA administrator Debra Shore and Norfolk Southern's CEO Alan Shaw have promised to ensure all the contamination is gone before finishing the cleanup.

On March 6, Shapiro announced that Norfolk Southern pledged $5 million to reimburse the fire departments for damaged equipment and another $1 million for damages to the people or businesses of Beaver and Lawrence Counties in Pennsylvania. Another $1.4 million was promised by the company, totaling an additional $7.4 million to what was initially pledged by the company to state agencies that responded to the incident.

The following week, Ohio Attorney General Dave Yost filed a 58-count civil lawsuit against Norfolk Southern.

On March 30, the United States Department of Justice sued Norfolk Southern on behalf of the Environmental Protection Agency, accusing the company of polluting waterways in violation of the Clean Water Act, and seeking the company to cover the cost of the cleanup fully.

In May 2023, Norfolk Southern announced compensation plans for homeowners whose homes lost value near the 2023 derailment in East Palestine, Ohio. The program applies to parts of Ohio and Pennsylvania near the derailment site and applies to those with homes on the market, future listings or sold since February 3.

In August 2023, NS announced that they are investing $500,000 into East Palestine's economy. The money will be used to hire a professional economic development consultant, who will help put in place plans to grow the area's economy. The focus of the economic recovery will include rejuvenating downtown, filling empty storefronts, and attracting new manufacturing companies to the area.

One year after the incident, Norfolk Southern has committed more than $100 million to East Palestine, including $25 million for a regional safety training center and $25 million in planned improvements to East Palestine's park. The company has also paid $21 million directly to residents.

As of January 2024, the railroad's costs related to the derailment were $1.1 billion, with $101 million in insurance payments issued.

Norfolk Southern is set to end relocation assistance for families living within a mile of the site of the derailment by February 9, 2024. According to The Columbus Dispatch, families attempting to obtain the financial assistance through the company have described a "complex process that they found exhausting and arbitrary."

In March 2024, US District Judge (Northern District of Ohio) John R. Adams ruled that the cleanup for the derailment is the sole responsibility of Norfolk Southern, negating the railroad's claim that the chemical manufacturer, OxyVinyls and the rail car company, GATX, should bear equal culpability for the removal of the dangerous chemicals.

The company agreed in April 2024 to pay $600 million to settle the class-action lawsuit. It provides payment for personal injuries in a 10-mile radius and compensation for disruption for residents and businesses within a 20-mile radius. In May 2024 a federal judge in the Northern District of Ohio proffered preliminary approval to the $600 million lawsuit settlement claimed by East Palestine residents and businesses.

In May 2024, Norfolk Southern agreed to spend $310 million as a settlement for its part in the East Palestine derailment accident that streamed dangerous chemicals into the water table, nearby rivers and waterways.

In September 2024, Federal Judge Benita Person ruled a final approval on the $600 million (US) that Norfolk Southern offered as settlement for a class-action suit on the train derailment. Attorneys for a dissident resident filed an appeal to the judge’s decision, estimating that payments might be delayed six to 12 months, and might be postponed even longer if the appeal were argued up to the US Supreme Court.

In January 2025, a $5 million lawsuit was filed against Norfolk Southern by Kelly Likovich and Terry Berresford, owners of the State Line Tavern in East Palestine, alleging that the derailment caused irreparable damage to their business and a nearby rental property.

=== NTSB board meeting and findings ===
In June 2024, at a meeting of the NTSB board in East Palestine, the board was presented with findings on the derailment and its consequences. NTSB members voted unanimously to accept the findings and announced a final report would be issued in the near future. The board did proclaim that Norfolk Southern's decision to release and burn toxic chemicals was “misguided” and that NS had “…misinterpreted and disregarded…” evidence in deciding to perform the release and burn operation. The Chair of the NTSB board, Jennifer Homendy accused Norfolk Southern of threatening the NTSB board, attempting to manufacture evidence and withholding documents from the investigation. She called the company's activity "unconscionable" and "reprehensible". She then recounted a series of “inappropriate” and “unethical” actions including hiring a private lab to test the vinyl chloride, presenting “a threat” to the board and inviting the five-member board to confer personally with the railway on the day prior to the formal NTSB board meeting. Norfolk Southern said its decisions and actions were made in the safety interests of first responders and the community.

=== Federal Railroad Administration safety culture assessment ===
In August 2023, the Federal Railroad Administration (FRA) issued a report known as a safety culture assessment about operations at Norfolk Southern. Parts of the assessment make references to the East Palestine derailment. This incident raised concerns among federal officials about Norfolk Southern’s handling of hazardous materials and prompted a regulatory response from the U.S. Department of Transportation (DOT) and the FRA.

Following the derailment, U.S. Transportation Secretary Pete Buttigieg issued a Call-to-Action, urging improvements in rail safety and stricter regulations for high-hazard flammable trains (HHFTs). The FRA assessment identified several contributing factors, including deficiencies in Norfolk Southern’s processes for handling and analyzing data from wayside detectors, which are critical for identifying mechanical issues like overheated bearings. The report also noted inaccuracies in train documentation, which could hinder emergency response efforts in incidents involving hazardous materials. The FRA’s major concerns about Norfolk Southern are its safety culture, inadequate communication, inconsistent procedures, and a focus on meeting minimum safety standards rather than proactive improvement.

=== Community impact ===
Following the accident, trains carrying hazardous materials, including vinyl chloride and butyl acrylate, continue to frequently pass through the town, according to NPR. On average, a Norfolk Southern train with at least one car marked as carrying hazardous materials passes the derailment site a minimum of 10 times a day. Despite efforts to improve safety and provide support, tensions persist among residents regarding long-term health concerns and settlements, according to the Howard Center for Investigative Journalism.

== Inquiry and cause ==
In the aftermath of the disaster, Norfolk Southern was accused of prioritizing $10 billion stock buybacks for shareholders instead of maintenance. Shaw was accused of sidestepping questions about Norfolk Southern's support for President Trump's 2017 overturning of the Obama administration requirement for ECP brakes and Norfolk Southern's pressing the federal government against a rule that, in most cases, would require more than one person operating a freight train.

=== Hearings ===
On June 22, the NTSB began a two-day public "field hearing" in East Palestine, which included testimony from emergency responders and scientists, and from representatives from Norfolk Southern and their contractors, rail unions, and chemical manufacturers. It was the agency's first on-site investigative hearing since a 2017 small aircraft crash in Alaska. The prior evening, residents were given a chance to ask NTSB and other government officials about the investigative process in a community meeting, with many residents expressing support for improvements in rail safety.

In October 2023, Norfolk Southern installed a new generation of automated inspection portals on its tracks near East Palestine. The portals can quickly spot safety defects on moving trains by taking pictures of every passing locomotive and rail car and then analyzing them with artificial intelligence. Norfolk Southern said it expects to have at least a dozen of them installed across its 22-state network in the East by the end of 2024.

Jason Cox of the Transportation Communications Union testified that since 2019, Norfolk Southern has slashed the number of expert car inspectors it employs, and that it had been exploiting a loophole in Federal regulations by having train crews do a 12-point inspection on railcars instead of the 90 to 105-point checks done by an expert carman. He also testified that the defective car had passed through three railyards without being inspected by on-duty qualified personnel. He said that the 12-point inspections are "just supposed to be a stopgap to get the freight car to an inspection point", but they were increasingly becoming the primary method across the industry.

Responding to an NTSB preliminary report released on February 13, which said an overheated wheel bearing likely caused the derailment, and that the train had passed through three hotbox sensors prior to the incident, Norfolk Southern representative Jared Hopewell testified that the third sensor had notified the train crew of the overheated bearing, but by then the crew's efforts to stop the train were too late. Constantine Tarawneh of the University of Texas Rio Grande Valley testified that hotbox detectors are "inefficient", and urged railroads to deploy more acoustic bearing detectors; one NTSB official said there are only 16 or 17 such detectors on US railways. The Washington Post reported that there are about 6,000 hotbox detectors spaced every 15 to 30 miles across North American railways; according to Norfolk Southern, they have a network of 1,000 detectors costing $200 million, generating 2 billion readings a year, of which 80 indicate a car requiring attention. The railroad also told The Post that their alarm threshold of 200 degrees is among the industry's lowest.

Investigators testified that railcars are required to carry placards indicating what chemicals they're carrying, but that Federal regulations only specify that they withstand normal weather exposure, and that some placards on derailed cars had burned in the extreme heat of the fire. Chief Drabik testified that local jurisdictions lack centralized communication and a 911 command center, and that more hazmat training and federal funding was required for small, mostly volunteer, departments like his own.

Local fire chief Keith Drabick testified that he was "blindsided" by the question of whether to vent and burn the tank cars carrying vinyl chloride, and that Norfolk Southern had given him only 13 minutes to decide. Representatives from chemical manufacturer OxyVinyls testified they believed at the time that their product was stable and had notified Norfolk Southern that a vent and burn was not required, but that the railroad had not passed on that information. He said that he made the final call after a consensus from the unified command—consisting of the Village of East Palestine, Beaver County Emergency Management Coordinator, U.S. EPA, Columbiana County Emergency Management Agency, Ohio EPA, and Norfolk Southern—all agreed that the vent and burn was "the least bad option".

In mid-February 2024, NTSB announced a final report board meeting on Tuesday morning, June 25 at East Palestine High School.

=== Brakes ===
Electronically controlled pneumatic (ECP) brakes may potentially reduce stopping distances by up to 60 percent over conventional railway air brakes. The derailed train was not equipped with ECP brakes, which former Federal Railroad Administration official Steven Ditmeyer said would have mitigated the severity of the accident. The Obama administration proposed safety regulations for trains carrying hazardous materials in 2014; these were weakened by lobbying from the railway industry. In 2017, further lobbying persuaded the Trump administration to begin a repeal of the regulations requiring the use of such brakes on trains.

The U.S. Department of Transportation's Pipeline and Hazardous Materials Safety Administration (PHMSA) said the FAST Act, enacted by the Republican-controlled 114th United States Congress and signed by President Barack Obama, instead required them to repeal ECP brake mandates, after a regulatory impact analysis report stated in 2018 that "the expected costs of ECP brakes are significantly higher than the expected benefit." The Trump administration finalized a roll back of the requirement for electronically controlled brakes in September 2018. The NTSB has recommended this technology for all trains. As of 2023, the Biden administration had not reinstated this rule, although Transportation Secretary Pete Buttigieg said that technology may have prevented the derailment.

NTSB chair Jennifer Homendy explained that the train in this accident would not have been required to utilize the ECP braking system even if the FAST Act was not repealed, because the term "high-hazard flammable train" means a single train transporting 20 or more tank cars loaded with a Class 3 flammable liquid. As it had only three such placarded train cars, the derailed train did not meet the qualifications of a "high-hazard flammable" train. Homendy addressed speculation on Twitter that a rule on electronically controlled pneumatic (ECP) brakes, if implemented, would have prevented the train derailment, which she said was "false".

== Reactions ==
Within hours of the derailment, Erin Brockovich started getting calls for assistance from the community about the toxic chemical fires. She has been interviewed on various news outlets regarding the issue, from independent media to national networks. A few weeks later, Brockovich traveled to East Palestine, Ohio where she was interviewed by local media, and appeared at one of several high-profile town hall meetings on Friday night, Feb. 24th. At the meeting, Brockovich and an attorney highlighted decades of toxic chemical train derailments. Among Brockovich's many concerns is the potential groundwater contamination after chemicals were, as she describes it, "dumped in a big hole in the ground and burned off." On February 24, prior to Brockovich's first town hall in East Palestine, an Ohio law enforcement fusion center, the Ohio Statewide Terrorism Analysis & Crime Center Terrorism Analysis Unit Situational Awareness, issued a report to law enforcement agencies claiming that her insistence on "placing blame solely on Norfolk Southern" could result in "increased tensions in the community" and possibly even the emergence of "special interest terrorism"; after receiving criticism for the bulletin, the Ohio Department of Public Safety denied that it was deeming Brockovich to be a terrorist threat.

=== Congress ===
The Biden administration, in particular U.S. Secretary of Transportation Pete Buttigieg, faced criticism after the derailment. Some lawmakers and locals of East Palestine described the response as delayed and lackluster. East Palestine's mayor criticized Biden's visit to Ukraine amid the derailment crisis. Right-wing and Republican lawmakers criticized Buttigieg, and some on the political left, such as David Sirota, also criticized Buttigieg. The Biden administration defended their response to the derailment, saying they had "mobilized a robust, multi-agency effort to support the people of East Palestine, Ohio" that was refused by DeWine.

Ohio Senator JD Vance, joined by other lawmakers, asked the Biden administration for funding to conduct a long-term study on the health effects the derailment disaster might have on nearby residents. However, the administration turned down the request, stating that it did not consider the study necessary. The House Republicans intended to launch a probe into the incident, as well as the "too late response", accusing the Transportation Department of neglect.

=== Misinformation ===
The derailment sparked the spread and circulation of misinformation, fake news, and conspiracy theories. Most were exaggerations of the derailment and the events surrounding it.

Some commentators alleged that concurrently-reported high-altitude object events were being overemphasized or even faked as a red herring to distract the public from the derailment or cover it up entirely. Conspiracy theories, such as those promulgated by congresswoman Marjorie Taylor Greene and football player Aaron Rodgers, claimed the U.S. government had faked the high-altitude objects to distract from the derailment, allegations of American responsibility for the Nord Stream pipeline sabotage, and the release of Jeffrey Epstein's client list. Chinese Ministry of Foreign Affairs spokeswoman Hua Chunying and South China Morning Post columnist Alex Lo suggested Western media were deliberately overemphasizing high-altitude object stories over the derailment. However, the derailment received constant coverage from news outlets since the initial derailment, though Media Matters for America noted most television news coverage did not cover it in depth and presented it merely "as an accident", with little mention of railway industry lobbying or safety regulation concerns.

A Wired editorial noted that while social media attention increased coverage on traditional media outlets, it also created a "perfect storm" for alarmist posts and conspiracy theories.

Allegations that police were arresting journalists attempting to report on the incident were also false. Only one journalist was arrested—NewsNation reporter Evan Lambert on February 8 for disorderly conduct and trespassing—but this was recorded live in a room full of witnesses and other journalists (making any attempt at a cover-up impractical), and charges against Lambert were dismissed on February 15, with him freely continuing to report on the derailment after his release. The U.S. Press Freedom Tracker and the Committee to Protect Journalists have reported no further arrests since Lambert's, nor have they been aware of any press restrictions.

Criticizing the spread of misinformation in regard to the derailment, Homendy urged the public to let the NTSB investigate and stop "adding pain to a community that's been through enough", adding that if people genuinely wanted to help, the NTSB was hiring.

=== Comparisons ===
Several news reports have drawn parallels between this derailment and the 2012 Paulsboro train derailment, which also involved the release of vinyl chloride.

Erin Brockovich cited the Hinkley case and Flint water crisis, as well as the 2013 Lac-Megantic, Canada oil train catastrophe. A recurring theme from her appearances is that the nation has, for decades, in the name of profits over people, continued to put off necessary infrastructure improvements, tighter regulations and better response to protect the health, safety and welfare of communities from long-term bodily harm and environmental damage.

Historians have noted the connection of this event to a longer history of industrial pollution crises in the Ohio River valley, notably the nearby Donora Smog of 1948.

Similarities between the derailment and the plot of the 2022 film White Noise have been noted. The film features a cataclysmic train accident that creates a plume of toxic chemical waste over an Ohio town. It was adapted from the 1985 novel of the same name by Don DeLillo. The central character, Jack Gladney, teaches at an Ohio college. The scene itself was filmed in East Palestine, and at least one resident who had been affected had served as an extra in the film.

=== Fraudulent charity scheme ===
In the aftermath of the derailment, a fraudulent charity scheme emerged, allegedly exploiting the community’s need for assistance. The Ohio Clean Water Fund, co-founded by Mike Peppel, raised nearly $149,000 by claiming to support affected residents through the Second Harvest Food Bank. However, it was later revealed that only $10,000 was donated to the Food Bank, while the remainder of the funds were misappropriated. Peppel and two associates, Isaiah Wartman and Luke Mahoney, faced litigation initiated by the Ohio Attorney General’s Office.

== Subsequent derailments ==
On March 4, 2023, another Norfolk Southern train derailed near Springfield, Ohio. The train was not transporting any hazardous chemicals, according to Norfolk Southern. In a statement on Sunday, March 5, 2023, the company reported that 28 cars of the 212-car train derailed, after initially reporting that 20 had derailed. The company also reported that the train's two-person crew was unharmed. Ohio senator Brown referred to the two derailments as "unacceptable." The NTSB preliminary report, released on February 13, noted that an overheated wheel bearing had likely caused the derailment.

On March 9, 2023, a third train derailed, in Calhoun County, Alabama, hours before CEO Alan Shaw met with lawmakers to discuss the February derailment. Thirty-seven cars and two waybill locomotives derailed, but there were no injuries or hazardous leaks. An NTSB report determined the two waybill locomotives were missing "alignment control couplers", which are designed to "resist lateral coupler movement under compressive in-train forces." A company spokesperson claimed that Norfolk Southern did not own the two locomotives and that the couplers were uncommon on its network.

On March 2, 2024, three Norfolk Southern trains collided and derailed in Easton, Pennsylvania, causing approximately $2.5 million (US) damage to track and the railcars, as well as non-life-threatening injuries to seven NS crew members. According to an NTSB investigation, three of the cars contained ethanol residue and butane residue. Two locomotives toppled into the Lehigh River and leaked diesel fuel, which crews were able to vacuum from the water. The NTSB was to release a final investigative report in 2025 or 2026.

== See also ==
- List of American railroad accidents
- List of rail accidents (2020–present)
- 2022 United States railroad labor dispute
- Concrete ties
- 2002 Farragut derailment, another Norfolk Southern derailment which caused release of hazardous chemicals
- Graniteville train crash, two Norfolk Southern freight trains collided, releasing toxic chlorine gas which killed 10 and injured 250 others
- Hazardous Materials Transportation Act
- Lac-Mégantic rail disaster, a Montreal, Maine and Atlantic freight train carrying crude oil derailed, resulting in an explosion which killed 47
- 1986 Miamisburg train derailment, a Baltimore and Ohio freight train derailment resulting in release of hazardous chemicals and the largest mass evacuation in Ohio history
- 1979 Mississauga train derailment, a CP Rail freight train derailed, releasing hazardous chemicals
- 1992 Nemadji River train derailment, a Burlington Northern freight train derailed, releasing nearly 22,000 gallons of liquid benzene into the Nemadji River and toxic emissions into the air, resulting in the largest evacuation in U.S. history from a train accident
- Weyauwega, Wisconsin, derailment, a Wisconsin Central freight train derailed, releasing hazardous chemicals
