= 2-EHA =

2-EHA may refer to:

- 2-Ethylhexanoic acid
- 2-Ethylhexyl acrylate
