= Afton, West Virginia =

Unincorporated community in West Virginia, United States

Afton
- Unincorporated community
- Location within the state of West Virginia Afton (the United States)
- Coordinates: 39°32′9″N 79°32′19″W
- Country: United States
- State: West Virginia
- County: Preston
- Elevation: 2,674 ft (815 m)
- Time zone: UTC-5 (Eastern (EST))
  - Summer (DST): UTC-4 (EDT)
- GNIS feature ID: 1549558

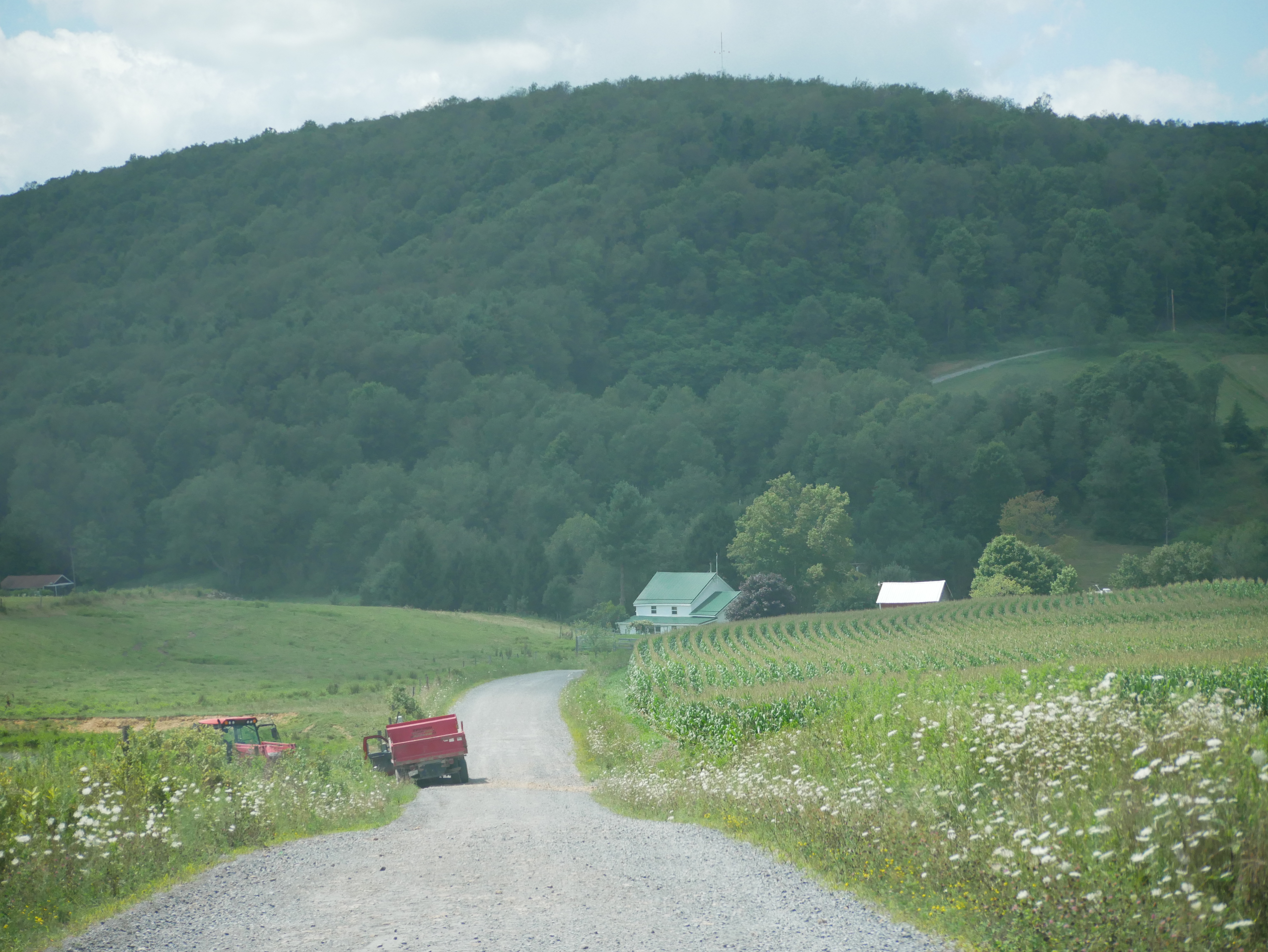
Afton as seen from County Route 36 heading west towards County Route 28.

Afton is an unincorporated community in Preston County, West Virginia, United States. It lies on County Route 28. Gregg Knob is located about two miles to the south.
