= National Weather Service Pittsburgh, Pennsylvania =

The National Weather Service Pittsburgh, Pennsylvania is a local forecast office of the National Weather Service responsible for monitoring weather conditions in western Pennsylvania, east-central Ohio and northern West Virginia, encompassing 35 counties. The Pittsburgh Weather Forecast Office (WFO) is located near Pittsburgh International Airport in Moon Township, Pennsylvania.

On November 10, 2020, the National Weather Service Baltimore/Washington assumed responsibility for Garrett County, Maryland from the National Weather Service Pittsburgh.

== First-order/climate sites ==
- Ohio
  - Harry Clever Field (New Philadelphia)
  - Zanesville Municipal Airport
- Pennsylvania
  - DuBois Regional Airport (Washington Township, Jefferson County)
  - Pittsburgh International Airport (Moon Township, Allegheny County)
- West Virginia
  - Morgantown Municipal Airport
  - Wheeling Ohio County Airport

== NOAA Weather Radio ==
The National Weather Service Pittsburgh, Pennsylvania forecast office provides programming for nine NOAA Weather Radio stations in Pennsylvania, Ohio, and West Virginia.

City of license	Call sign	Frequency (MHz)
Pittsburgh, Pennsylvania	KIH35	162.550 MHz
Bridgeport, Ohio	WWF35	162.525 MHz
High Hill, Ohio	WXJ47	162.475 MHz
Parker, Pennsylvania	WWG53	162.425 MHz
Backbone Mountain	KXI73	162.450 MHz
Gregg Knob	KWN36	162.500 MHz
Morgantown, West Virginia	KWN35	162.475 MHz
New Philadelphia, Ohio	WNG735	162.425 MHz
Punxsutawney, Pennsylvania	KZZ42	162.500 MHz
