= National Weather Service Baltimore/Washington =

National Weather Service Weather Forecast Office Baltimore/Washington

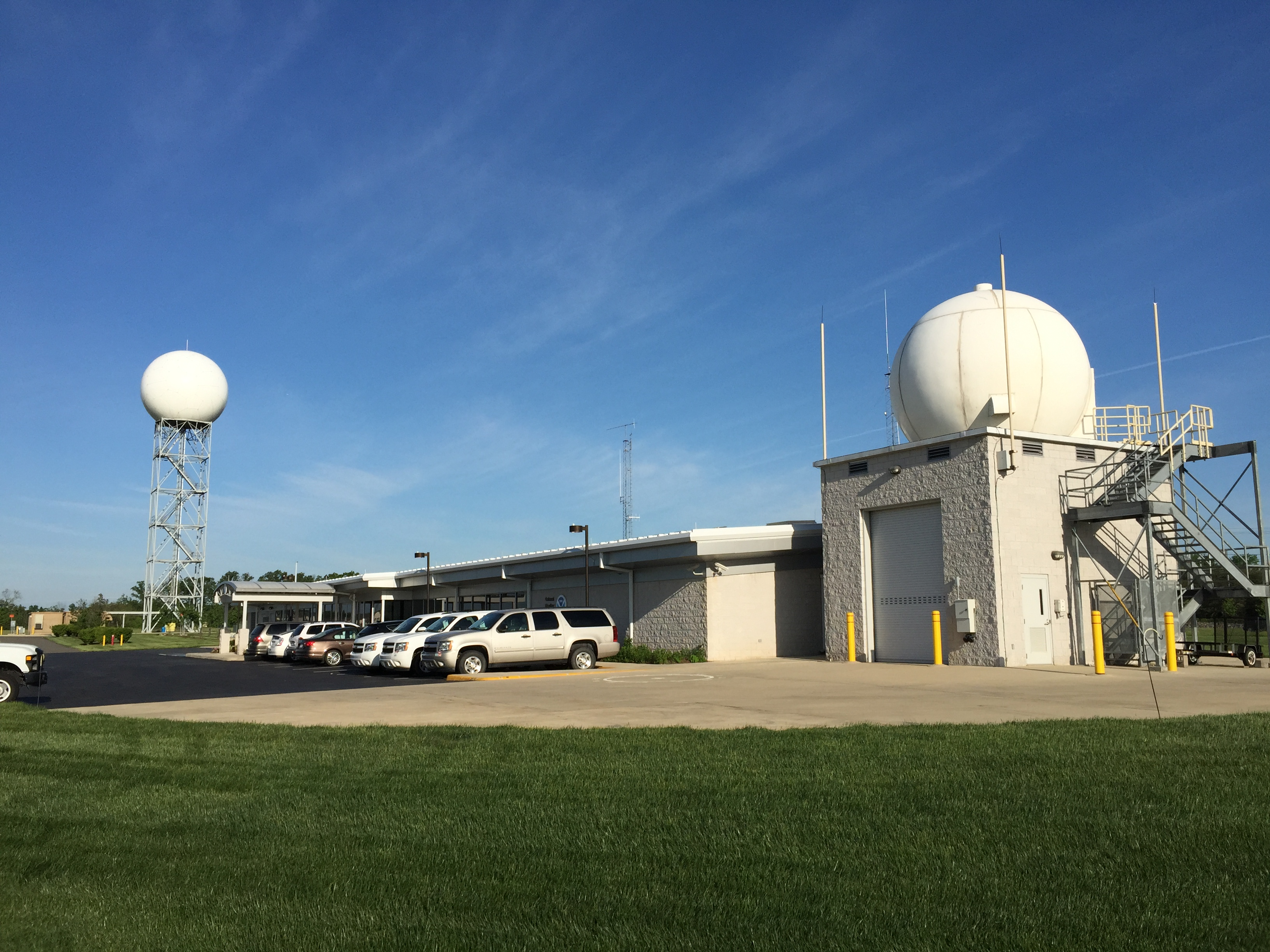
- The National Weather Service Forecast Office in Sterling, Virginia

Agency overview
- Type: Meteorological
- Jurisdiction: National Weather Service
- Headquarters: 43858 Weather Service Rd. Sterling, VA 20166; 38°58′35″N 77°29′08″W
- Employees: 25
- Agency executives: James E. Lee, Meteorologist in Charge; Christopher Strong, Warning Coordination Meteorologist
- Parent agency: National Weather Service
- Website: www.weather.gov/lwx/

The National Weather Service Baltimore/Washington is a local office of the National Weather Service responsible for monitoring weather conditions in 44 counties in eastern West Virginia, northern and central Virginia, the majority of the state of Maryland, as well as the city of Washington, D.C. Although labeled as the NWS Baltimore/Washington, its actual location is off Old Ox Road (Virginia State Route 606) in the Dulles section of Sterling, Virginia, adjacent to Washington Dulles International Airport.

The NWS Baltimore/Washington currently employs about 25 people including meteorologists, support personnel, and management staff, working rotating shifts 24 hours a day, 7 days a week.

As of November 10, 2020, the National Weather Service Baltimore/Washington is responsible for Cecil County, Maryland, rather than the National Weather Service Mount Holly/Philadelphia. As of the same date, the National Weather Service Baltimore/Washington is responsible for Garrett County, Maryland, rather than the National Weather Service Pittsburgh.

== Jurisdictions served ==
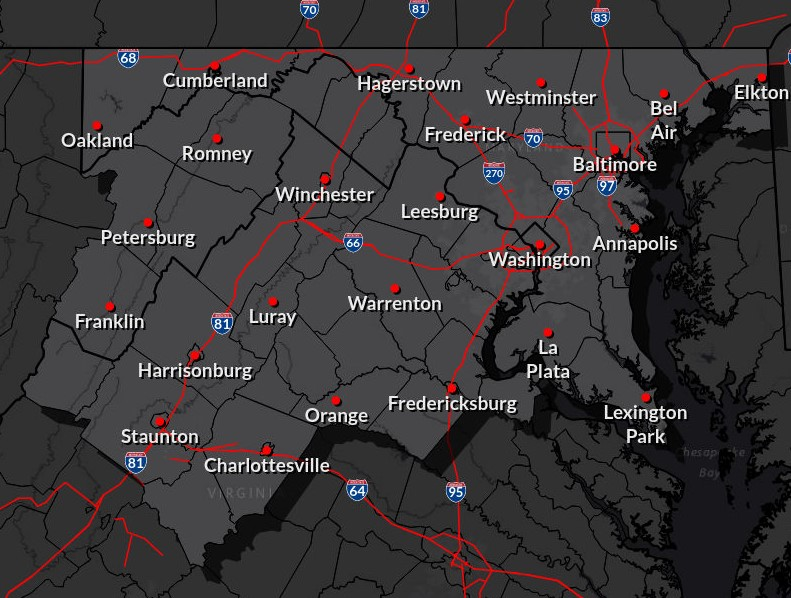
The National Weather Service Office in Sterling, Virginia's forecast area includes the District of Columbia, much of Maryland, Northern Virginia, and eastern West Virginia.

=== District of Columbia ===
- Washington, D.C.

=== Maryland ===
==== Counties ====
- Allegany County
- Anne Arundel County
- Baltimore County
- Calvert County
- Carroll County
- Cecil County (from November 10, 2020)
- Charles County
- Frederick County
- Garrett County (from November 10, 2020)
- Harford County
- Howard County
- Montgomery County
- Prince George's County
- St. Mary's County
- Washington County

==== Independent city ====
- City of Baltimore

=== Virginia ===
==== Counties ====
- Albemarle County
- Arlington County
- Augusta County
- Clarke County
- Culpeper County
- Fairfax County
- Fauquier County
- Frederick County
- Greene County
- Highland County
- King George County
- Loudoun County
- Madison County
- Nelson County
- Orange County
- Page County
- Prince William County
- Rappahannock County
- Rockingham County
- Shenandoah County
- Spotsylvania County
- Stafford County
- Warren County

==== Independent cities ====
- City of Alexandria
- City of Charlottesville
- City of Fairfax
- City of Falls Church
- City of Fredericksburg
- City of Harrisonburg
- City of Manassas
- City of Manassas Park
- City of Staunton
- City of Waynesboro
- City of Winchester

=== West Virginia ===
- Berkeley County
- Grant County
- Hampshire County
- Hardy County
- Jefferson County
- Mineral County
- Morgan County
- Pendleton County

== Aviation weather services locations ==
- Maryland
  - Baltimore–Washington International Airport (Linthicum)
  - Martin State Airport (Middle River)
- Virginia
  - Charlottesville-Albemarle Airport (Charlottesville)
  - Ronald Reagan Washington National Airport (Arlington)
  - Washington Dulles International Airport (Chantilly/Sterling)
- West Virginia
  - Shepherd Field/Eastern West Virginia Regional Airport (Martinsburg)

== First-order/climate sites ==
- Maryland
  - Baltimore–Washington International Airport (Linthicum)
  - Hagerstown Regional Airport
  - Maryland Science Center (Baltimore)
- Virginia
  - Charlottesville-Albemarle Airport
  - Ronald Reagan Washington National Airport (Arlington)
  - Washington Dulles International Airport (Chantilly/Sterling)
- West Virginia
  - Eastern WV Regional Airport (Martinsburg)

== NOAA Weather Radio ==
The National Weather Service Baltimore/Washington forecast office provides programming for eight NOAA Weather Radio stations.

City of license	Call sign	Frequency (MHz)	Power	Service area of transmitter
Baltimore, Maryland	KEC83	162.400 MHz	1,000 watts	Baltimore Metro Area and northeastern Maryland
Hagerstown, Maryland	WXM42	162.475 MHz	1,000 watts	Central Maryland, Northern Shenandoah Valley
Manassas, Virginia	KHB36	162.550 MHz	1,000 watts	Northern Virginia
Moorefield, West Virginia	WXM73	162.400 MHz	500 watts	Potomac Highlands, Shenandoah Valley
Frostburg, Maryland	WXM43	162.425 MHz	300 watts	Western Maryland, Potomac Highlands
Charlottesville, Virginia	KZZ28	162.450 MHz	1,000 watts	Charlottesville Metro Area and Central Virginia
Washington, D.C.	WNG736	162.450 MHz	300 watts	Immediate Washington Metro Area
Fredericksburg, Virginia	WZ2527	162.425 MHz	300 watts	Fredericksburg Metro Area and Northern Virginia
