= HAZMAT Class 2 Gases =

Hazard classification for gases in transport

The HAZMAT Class 2 in United States law includes all gases which are compressed and stored for transportation. Class 2 has three divisions: Flammable (also called combustible), Non-Flammable/Non-Poisonous, and Poisonous. This classification is based on the United Nations' Recommendations on the Transport of Dangerous Goods - Model Regulations. In Canada, the Transportation of Dangerous Goods Regulations, or TDGR, are also based on the UN Model Regulations and contain the same three divisions.

== Divisions ==
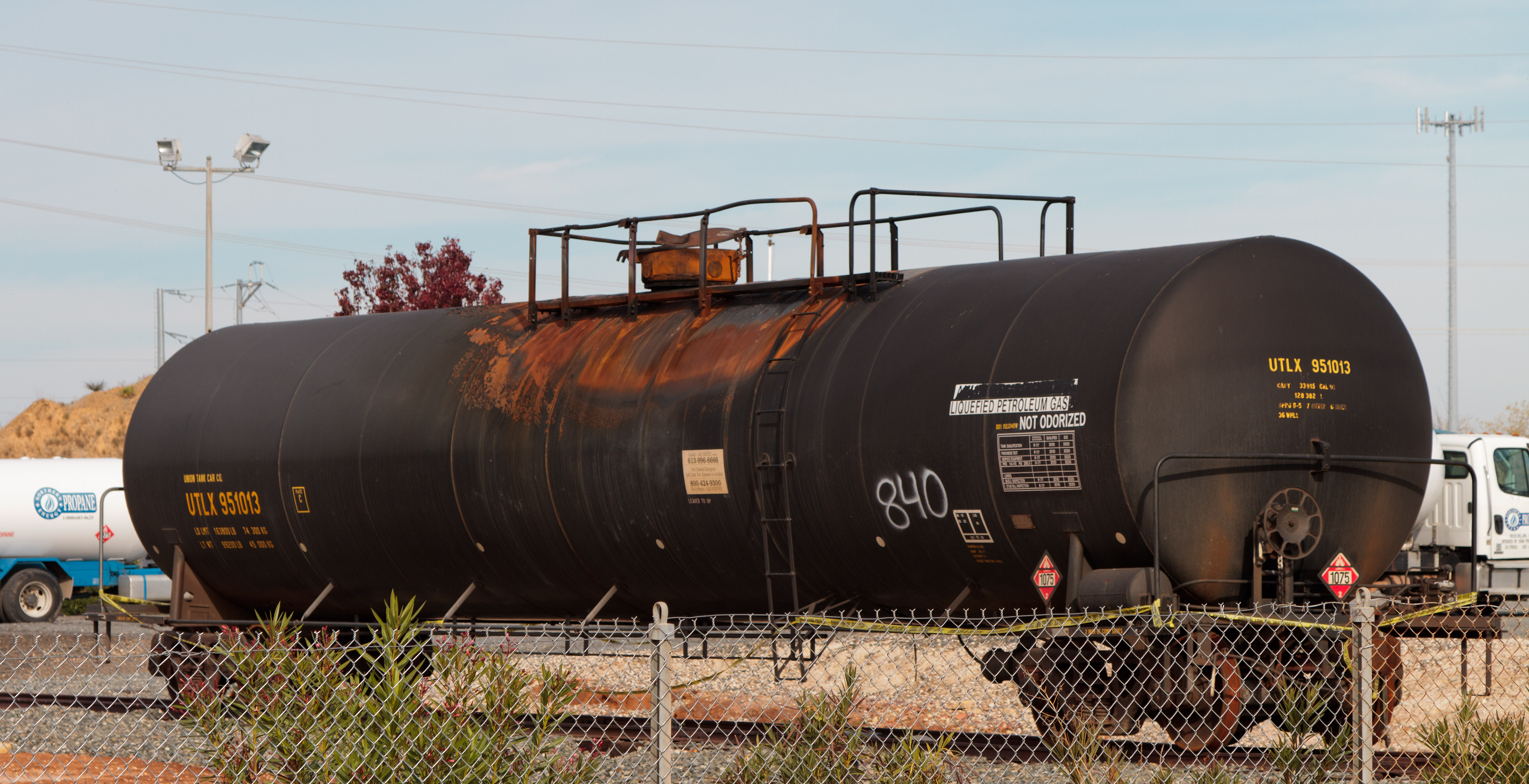
A propane tank car after a fire, the HAZMAT 1075 symbol can be seen in red as a warning of the danger posed by the gas.

A gas is a substance which

1. (a) at 50 °C (122 °F) has a vapor pressure greater than 300 kPa (43.51 PSI) or
2. (b) is completely gaseous at 20 °C (68 °F) at a standard pressure of 101.3 kPa (14.69 PSI).

Gases are assigned to one of three divisions

1. division 2.1 Flammable gas
2. division 2.2 Non flammable, Non-toxic gas
3. division 2.3 Toxic gas

Aerosols also fall into Class 2 divisions where an aerosol is defined as an article consisting of any non-refillable receptacle containing a gas compressed, liquefied or dissolved under pressure, the sole purpose of which is to expel a nonpoisonous (other than a Division 6.1 Packing Group III material) liquid, paste, or powder and fitted with a self-closing release device allowing the contents to be ejected by the gas.

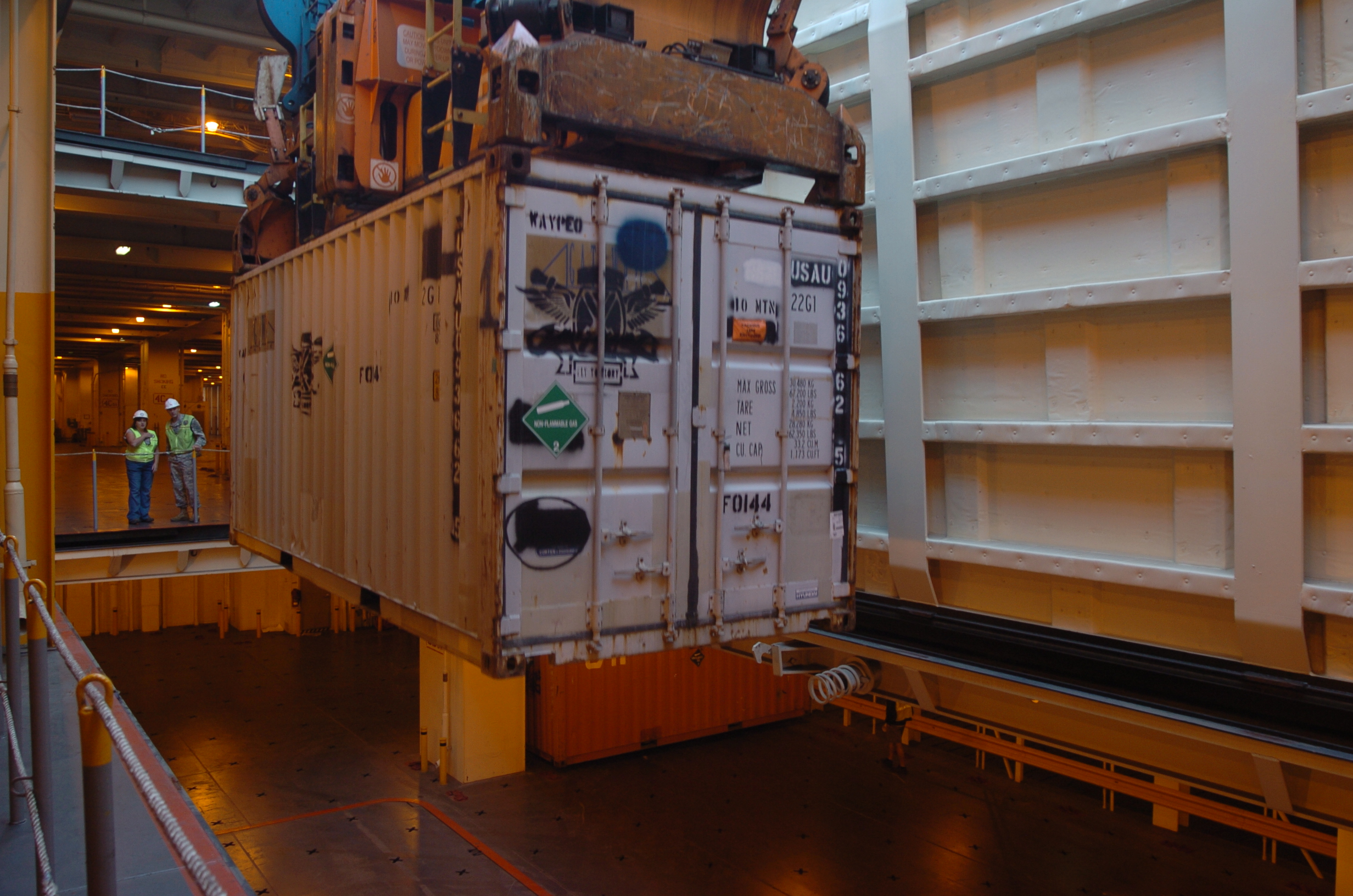
Loading a container (with the hazmat Class 2 symbol on the rear doors) aboard a ship.

Division 2.1: Flammable, Non-Toxic Gas

Flammable gas means any material that:

1. Is ignitable at 101.3 kPa (14.7 psia) when in a mixture of 13% or less by volume with air; or
2. Has a flammable range at 101.3 kPa with air of at least 12% regardless of the lower limit.
3. Is determined to be flammable in accordance with ASTM E681-85, Standard Test Method for Concentration Limits of Flammability of Chemicals

The following applies to aerosols:

1. An aerosol must be assigned to Division 2.1 if the contents include 85% by mass or more flammable components and the chemical heat of combustion is 30 kJ/g or more;
2. An aerosol must be assigned to Division 2.1 if it is deemed flammable in accordance with the appropriate tests of the UN Manual of Tests and Criteria for flammability.

Division 2.2: Non-Flammable, Non-Toxic Gas

This division includes compressed gas, liquefied gas, pressurized cryogenic gas, compressed gas in solution, asphyxiant gas and oxidizing gas. A non-flammable, nonpoisonous compressed gas (Division 2.2) means any material (or mixture) which:

A non-flammable gas means any material that:

1. Exerts in the packaging an absolute pressure of 280 kPa (40.6 psia) or greater at 20 °C (68 °F), and
2. Does not meet the definition of Division 2.1 or 2.3.

The following applies to aerosols:

1. An aerosol must be assigned to Division 2.2 if the contents contain 1% by mass or less flammable components and the heat of combustion is less than 20 kJ/g.

Division 2.3: Toxic Gas

Gas poisonous by inhalation means a material which is a gas at 20 °C or less and a pressure of 101.3 kPa (a material which has a boiling point of 20 °C or less at 101.3kPa (14.7 psi)) and which:

1. Is known to be so toxic to humans as to pose a hazard to health during transportation, or
2. In the absence of adequate data on human toxicity, is presumed to be toxic to humans because when tested on laboratory animals it has an LC_{50} value of not more than 5000 ml/m^{3}. See 49CFR 173.116(a) for assignment of Hazard Zones A, B, C or D. LC_{50} values for mixtures may be determined using the formula in 49 CFR 173.133(b)(1)(i)

== Placards ==
Hazardous Materials; Class 2.1: Flammable Gas	Hazardous Materials; Class 2.2: Nonflammable Gas
Hazardous Materials; Class 2.2: Oxygen (Alternative Placard)	Hazardous Materials; Class 2.3: Inhalation Hazard (Alternative Placard)

== Compatibility table ==
Load and Segregation Chart
	Mass		1.1	1.2	1.3	1.4	1.5	1.6	2.1	2.2	2.2	2.3		3	4.1	4.2	4.3	5.1	5.2	6.1	7	8
	Mass		1.1	1.2	1.3	1.4	1.5	1.6	2.1	2.2	2.2	A	B	3	4.1	4.2	4.3	5.1	5.2	A	7	8
2.1	1,001 lb (454 kg)		No	No	No	O	No					No	O							O	O	
2.2	1,001 lb (454 kg)	B	No				No					No	O									
2.2	1,001 lb (454 kg)	B	No				No					No	O									
2.3A	Any quantity		No	No	No	O	No		No					No	No	No	No	No	No			No
2.3B	Any quantity		No	No	No	O	No		O					O	O	O	O	O	O			
Key
The absence of any hazard class or division or a blank space in the table indicates that no restrictions apply.: X: These materials may not be loaded, transported, or stored together in the same transport vehicle or storage facility during the course of transportation.; O: Indicates that these materials may not be loaded, transported or stored together in the same transport vehicle or storage facility during the course of transportation, unless separated in a manner that, in the event of leakage from packages under conditions normally incident to transportation, commingling of hazardous materials would not occur.; B: For domestic shipments of compressed oxygen, or refrigerated liquid oxygen the "Oxygen" placard may be used instead of a "Non-flammable Gas" placard. See §172.504(f)(7).; Source: United States Code of Federal Regulations, Title 49 CFR §177.848 - Segregation of hazardous materials.
