= Reactive distillation =

Reactive distillation is a process where the chemical reactor is also the still. Separation of the product from the reaction mixture does not need a separate distillation step which saves energy (for heating) and materials. This technique can be useful for equilibrium-limited reactions such as esterification and ester hydrolysis reactions. Conversion can be increased beyond what is expected by the equilibrium due to the continuous removal of reaction products from the reactive zone. This approach can also reduce capital and investment costs.

The conditions in the reactive column are suboptimal both as a chemical reactor and as a distillation column, since the reactive column combines these. The introduction of an in situ separation process in the reaction zone or vice versa leads to complex interactions between vapor–liquid equilibrium, mass transfer rates, diffusion and chemical kinetics, which poses a great challenge for design and synthesis of these systems. Side reactors, where a separate column feeds a reactor and vice versa, are better for some reactions, if the optimal conditions of distillation and reaction differ too much.

== Applicable processes ==
Reactive distillation can be used with a wide variety of chemistries, including the following:

- Acetylation
- Aldol condensation
- Alkylation
- Amination
- Dehydration
- Esterification
- Etherification
- Hydrolysis
- Isomerization
- Neutralization
- Oligomerization
- Transesterification
- Hydrodesulfurization of light oil fractions

=== Examples ===
The esterification of acetic acid with alcohols including methanol, n-butanol, ethanol, isobutanol, and amyl alcohol.

Another interesting feature of this system is that it is associated with the formation of a minimum boiling ternary azeotrope of ester, alcohol and water, which is heterogeneous in nature. Hence, in a typical reactive distillation column that consists of both reactive and non-reactive zones, the heterogeneous azeotrope or a composition close to the azeotrope can be obtained as the distillate product. Moreover, the aqueous phase that forms after the condensation of the vapor is almost pure water. Depending on the requirement either of the phases can be withdrawn as a product and the other phase can be recycled back as reflux. The pure ester i.e. butyl acetate, being the least volatile component in the system, is realized as a bottom product.

Removing organic acids from aqueous alcohol (ethanol, isopropanol) in dewatering columns is a simple example. An aqueous base (NaOH, KOH) is added to the top of the column, acid-base reactions occur in the column, and the resulting organic salts and excess base exit the bottom of the column with the separated water.
