= Screening (environmental) =

Analytical methods used to monitor environmental hazards

In the environmental sciences, screening broadly refers to analytical techniques used to monitor levels of potentially hazardous organic compounds in the environment, particularly in tandem with mass spectrometry techniques. Such screening techniques are typically classified as either targeted, where compounds of interest are chosen before the analysis begins, or non-targeted, where compounds of interest are chosen at a later stage of the analysis. These two techniques can be organized into at least three approaches: target screening, using reference standards that are analogous to the target compound; suspect screening, which uses a library of cataloged data such as exact mass, isotope patterns, and chromatographic retention times in lieu of reference standards; and non-target screening, using no pre-existing knowledge for comparison before analysis.

As such, target screening is most useful when monitoring the presence of specific organic compounds—particularly for regulatory purposes—which requires higher selectivity and sensitivity. When the number of detected compounds and associated metabolites needs to be maximized for discovering new or emerging environmental trends or biomarkers for disease, a non-targeted approach has traditionally been used. However, the rapid improvement of mass spectrometers into more high-resolution forms, with increased sensitivity, has made suspect and non-target screening more attractive, either as stand-alone approaches or in conjunction with more targeted methods.

== Approaches to environmental screening ==
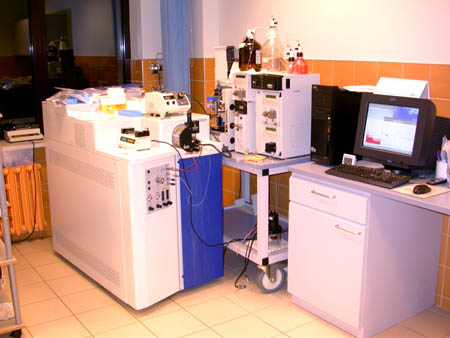
Mass spectrometry is used in conjunction with chromatography for environmental screening processes.

Mass spectrometry methods are generally used for analysis of environmental contaminant monitoring, particularly in aquatic environments (though they can be applied in non-aquatic environments, such as with screening pesticides on plant matter), paired with chromatography for separation. For target screening, this means using gas chromatography–mass spectrometry (GC-MS) or liquid chromatography–mass spectrometry (LC-MS) methods "that use single reaction monitoring (SIM) or selected reaction monitoring (SRM) modes."

However, for suspect and non-target screening, these methods are inadequate due to recording only a limited number of compounds and insufficient useful information can be determined about unknown compounds, particularly given the dearth of LC-MS comparison libraries. For those non-targeted screening approaches, high-resolution mass spectrometry and high mass accuracy chromatography techniques are required. Combinations of quadrupole, time-of-flight, ion trap, and orbitrap mass spectrometry analyzers have emerged, along with high-performance liquid chromatography (and ultra-high-performance liquid chromatography), to more rapidly and effectively tackle suspect and non-target screening.

=== Target screening ===
Target screening or analysis is useful when looking for a short list of predetermined organic compounds in a sample, while ignoring other compounds that may be present. Reference standards that align with the predetermined compounds are available and used to compare attributes such as chromatographic retention time, fragmentation pattern, and isotopic pattern. The workflow for target screening requires the optimization of sample extraction, sample clean-up, and instrumentation methods to those predetermined compounds in order to achieve "a specific and accurate measurement." Most analytical results will be quantitative in nature, given the narrow focus of screening.

As such, targeted approaches have traditionally been used in regulatory monitoring schemes. The downside, however, is that many hazardous organic compounds are not covered by environmental monitoring regulation and thus not specifically targeted, and the approach is not generally apt for rapid response approaches to providing early warning of contamination events.

=== Suspect screening ===
Suspect screening is useful when looking for one or more suspected compounds with known structures in a sample, but reference standards are unavailable or don't exist. In this case, user-built databases containing information such as mass accuracy, retention time, isotopic patterns, and other structure information for the suspected compounds are consulted, filtered, and compared against the results of high-resolution mass spectrometry analyses using SRM or full scans. The structure of the suspected compounds are then elucidated based on that information, ideally confirmed with authentic reference standards. Compared to targeted screening, the initial work performed in suspect screening is largely qualitative, with more quantitative work to potentially follow in a more targeted approach.

Aside from being able to analyze for more compounds, an additional benefit of this approach is that retrospective analysis, even years later, is enabled without reanalyzing the sample. A downside to the suspect approach is the complexity involved, including not only with data analysis (e.g., using in silico fragmentation software) but also carefully developing suspect screening lists and choosing databases.

=== Non-target screening ===
Non-target screening is useful when needing to investigate the presences of all the organic compounds within a sample. In this case, since no information is known about the compounds contained in the sample, no reference standard can be used for comparison, at least initially, overall making non-target screening one of the most challenging approaches. Rather, a full automated scan with mass filtering, peak detection, and other characteristics is used to make initial compound detection. Then elemental composition of detected compounds is deduced using accurate mass of the ions. Database searches can be performed to get a lock on what the most plausible structures are given the elemental composition.

Like suspect screening, the initial work performed in non-target screening is largely qualitative, with more quantitative work to potentially follow. Similar to suspect screening, the downside to a fully non-targeted approach is the data-intensive nature of the processes, requiring multivariate statistical models, and the wide variety of data processing workflows used by researchers further complicates evaluation of method performance of those data analysis processes.
