= HAZMAT Class 3 Flammable liquids =

Standardized liquid property

A flammable liquid is a liquid with flash point of not more than 60.5 °C (141 °F), or any material in a liquid phase with a flash point at or above 37.8 °C (100 °F) that is intentionally heated and offered for transportation or transported at or above its flash point in a bulk packaging.

== Divisions ==
Class 3: Flammable Liquids

A flammable liquid is a liquid having a flash point of not more than 60 °C (140 °F), or any material in a liquid phase with a flash point at or above 37.8 °C (100 °F) that is intentionally heated and offered for transportation or transported at or above its flash point in a bulk packaging. The following exceptions apply:

1. Any liquid meeting one of the definitions specified in 49CFR 173.115.
2. Any mixture having one or more components with a flash point of 60.5 °C (141 °F) or higher, that make up at least 99 percent of the total volume of the mixture, if the mixture is not offered for transportation or transported at or above its flash point.
3. Any liquid with a flash point greater than 35 °C (95 °F) which does not sustain combustion according to ASTM 4206 or the procedure in Appendix H of this part.
4. Any liquid with a flash point greater than 35 °C (95 °F) and with a fire point greater than 100 °C (212 °F) according to ISO 2592.
5. Any liquid with a flash point greater than 35 °C (95 °F) which is in a water-miscible solution with a water content of more than 90 percent by mass.

== Placards ==
Hazardous Materials; Class 3: Flammable Liquids	Hazardous Materials; Class 3: Combustible (Alternate Placard)	Hazardous Materials; Class 3: Fuel Oil (Alternate Placard)
	Hazardous Materials; Class 3: Gasoline (Alternate Placard)	

== Alternate placards and labeling ==
- Combustible Liquids:
  - A combustible liquid means any liquid that does not meet the definition of any other hazard class specified in this subchapter and has a flash point above 60.5 °C (141 °F) and below 93 °C (200 °F).
  - A flammable liquid with a flash point at or above 38 °C (100 °F) that does not meet the definition of any other hazard class may be reclassed as a combustible liquid. This provision does not apply to transportation by vessel or aircraft, except where other means of transportation is impracticable. An elevated temperature material that meets the definition of a Class 3 material because it is intentionally heated and offered for transportation or transported at or above its flash point may not be reclassed as a combustible liquid.
  - A combustible liquid which does not sustain combustion is not subject to the requirements of this subchapter as a combustible liquid. Either the test method specified in ASTM 4206 or the procedure in Appendix H of this part may be used to determine if a material sustains combustion when heated under test conditions and exposed to an external source of flame.
- Gasoline: This placard is an alternative placard, which may be used for gasoline in non-bulk quantities.
- Fuel Oil: This placard is an alternative placard, which may be used for fuel oil in non-bulk quantities.

== Compatibility table ==
Load and Segregation Chart
	Mass	1.1	1.2	1.3	1.4	1.5	1.6	2.1	2.2	2.2	2.3		3	4.1	4.2	4.3	5.1	5.2	6.1	7	8
	Mass	1.1	1.2	1.3	1.4	1.5	1.6	2.1	2.2	2.2	A	B	3	4.1	4.2	4.3	5.1	5.2	A	7	8
3	1,001 lb (454 kg)	No	No	No	O	No					No	O					O		No		
Key
The absence of any hazard class or division or a blank space in the table indicates that no restrictions apply.: X: These materials may not be loaded, transported, or stored together in the same transport vehicle or storage facility during the course of transportation.; O: Indicates that these materials may not be loaded, transported or stored together in the same transport vehicle or storage facility during the course of transportation, unless separated in a manner that, in the event of leakage from packages under conditions normally incident to transportation, commingling of hazardous materials would not occur.; Source: United States Code of Federal Regulations, Title 49 CFR §177.848 - Segregation of hazardous materials.

== Packing groups ==
Class 3 packing groups
Packing group	Flash point (closed-cup)	Initial boiling point
I		<=35°C (95°F)
II	<23°C (73°F)	>35°C (95°F)
III	>=23°C, <=60°C (140°F)	>35°C (95°F)
