= 2-Ethylhexyl acrylate =

Names
- Preferred IUPAC name 2-Ethylhexyl prop-2-enoate
- Other names 2-Ethylhexyl acrylate 2-EHA

Identifiers
CAS Number	103-11-7
3D model (JSmol)	Interactive image
ChEBI	CHEBI:82465
ChemSpider	7354
ECHA InfoCard	100.002.801
EC Number	203-080-7
KEGG	C19420
PubChem CID	7636
UNII	HR49R9S6XG
CompTox Dashboard (EPA)	DTXSID9025297
- InChI: InChI=1S/C11H20O2/c1-4-7-8-10(5-2)9-13-11(12)6-3/h6,10H,3-5,7-9H2,1-2H3 Key: GOXQRTZXKQZDDN-UHFFFAOYSA-N
- SMILES: CCCCC(CC)COC(=O)C=C

Properties
Chemical formula	C_{11}H_{20}O_{2}
Molar mass	184.279 g·mol^{−1}
Appearance	colorless liquid
Density	0.885 g/mL
Melting point	−90 °C (−130 °F; 183 K)
Boiling point	215–219 °C (419–426 °F; 488–492 K)
Solubility in water	organic solvents

Hazards
- GHS labelling
Pictograms	(GHS07: Exclamation mark)
Signal word	Warning
Hazard statements	H315, H317, H335, H412
Precautionary statements	P273, P280, P304+P340+P312, P333+P313
Flash point	82 °C; 180 °F; 355 K
Autoignition temperature	258 °C; 496 °F; 531 K
- Except where otherwise noted, data are given for materials in their standard state (at 25 °C [77 °F], 100 kPa). Infobox references

2-Ethylhexyl acrylate is a colorless liquid acrylate used in the making of paints, plastics and adhesives. It has an odor that has been variously described as pleasant or acrid and musty.

== Preparation ==
Racemic 2-ethylhexyl acrylate can be prepared with a high yield by esterification of acrylic acid with racemic 2-ethylhexanol in the presence of hydroquinone as a polymerization inhibitor and a strong acid such as methanesulfonic acid by reactive distillation using toluene as an azeotroping agent.

== Properties ==
2-Ethylhexyl acrylate polymerizes easily. The polymerization can be initiated by light, peroxides, heat, or contaminants. It can react violently when combined with strong oxidants and can form explosive mixtures with air at temperatures above 82 °C (180 °F). The chemical, physical, and toxicological properties, however, can be greatly modified by additives or stabilizers.

== Use ==
2-Ethylhexyl acrylate and butyl acrylate are the major base monomers for the preparation of acrylate adhesives. 2-Ethylhexyl acrylate can react by free-radical polymerization to form macromolecules having a molecular weight of up to 200,000 g/mol. Other monomers such as vinyl acetate, methyl acrylate, and styrene may be copolymerized to modify the properties of the resulting polymer.
