= Gregg Knob =

Mountain of West Virginia, United States

Coordinates: 39°30′05″N 79°32′00″W

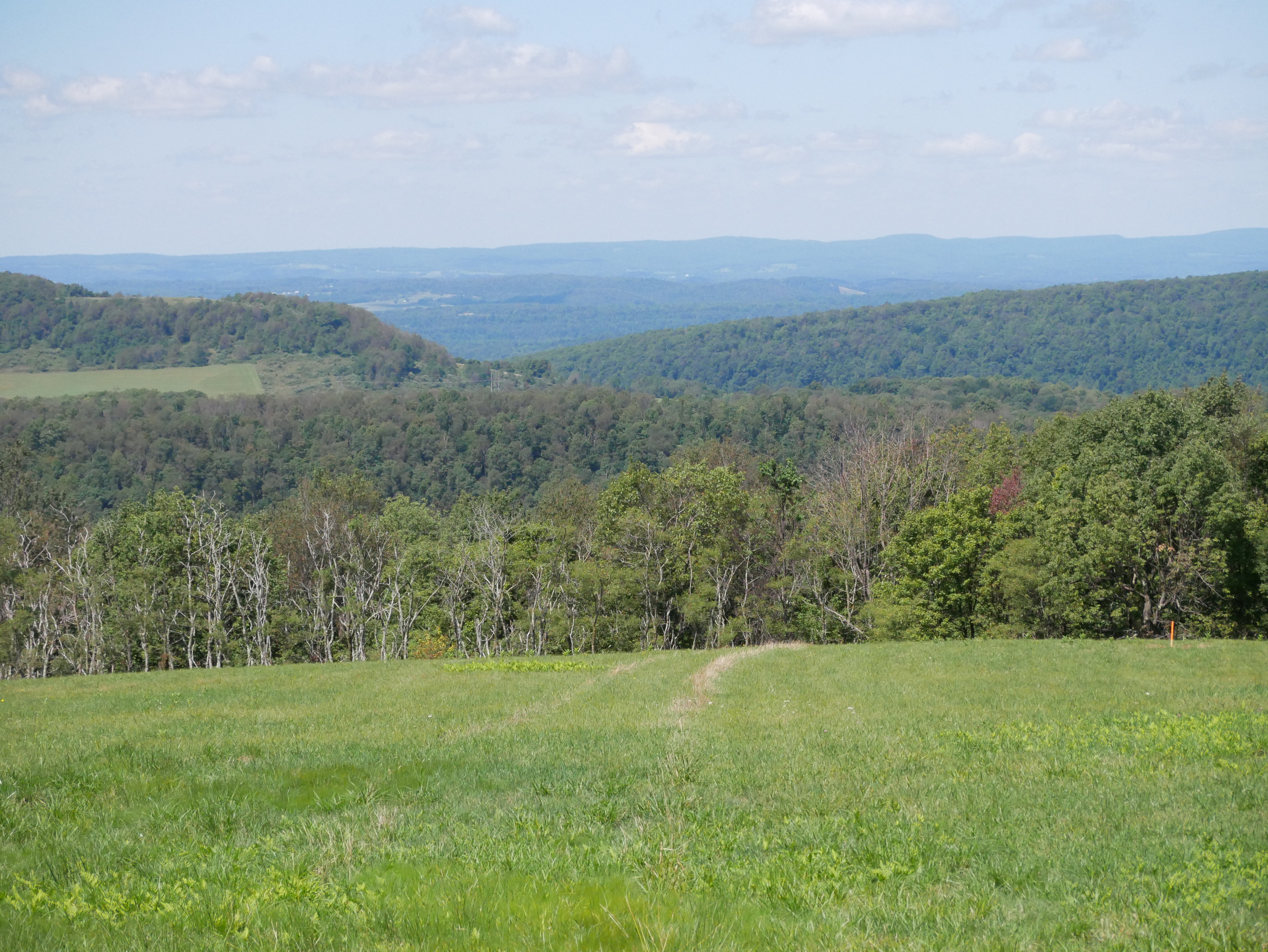
View from the northwestern side of Gregg Knob, looking northwest.

Gregg Knob is a summit near Afton, West Virginia, in the United States. With an elevation of 3,150 feet (960 m), Gregg Knob is the 302nd highest summit in the state of West Virginia.

The summit was named after Elihu Gregg, an early settler. A ski slope with two tows operated on the northeastern face of Gregg Knob from 1955 to 1961.
