= Old Hemlock =

Historic house in West Virginia, United States

- U.S. National Register of Historic Places
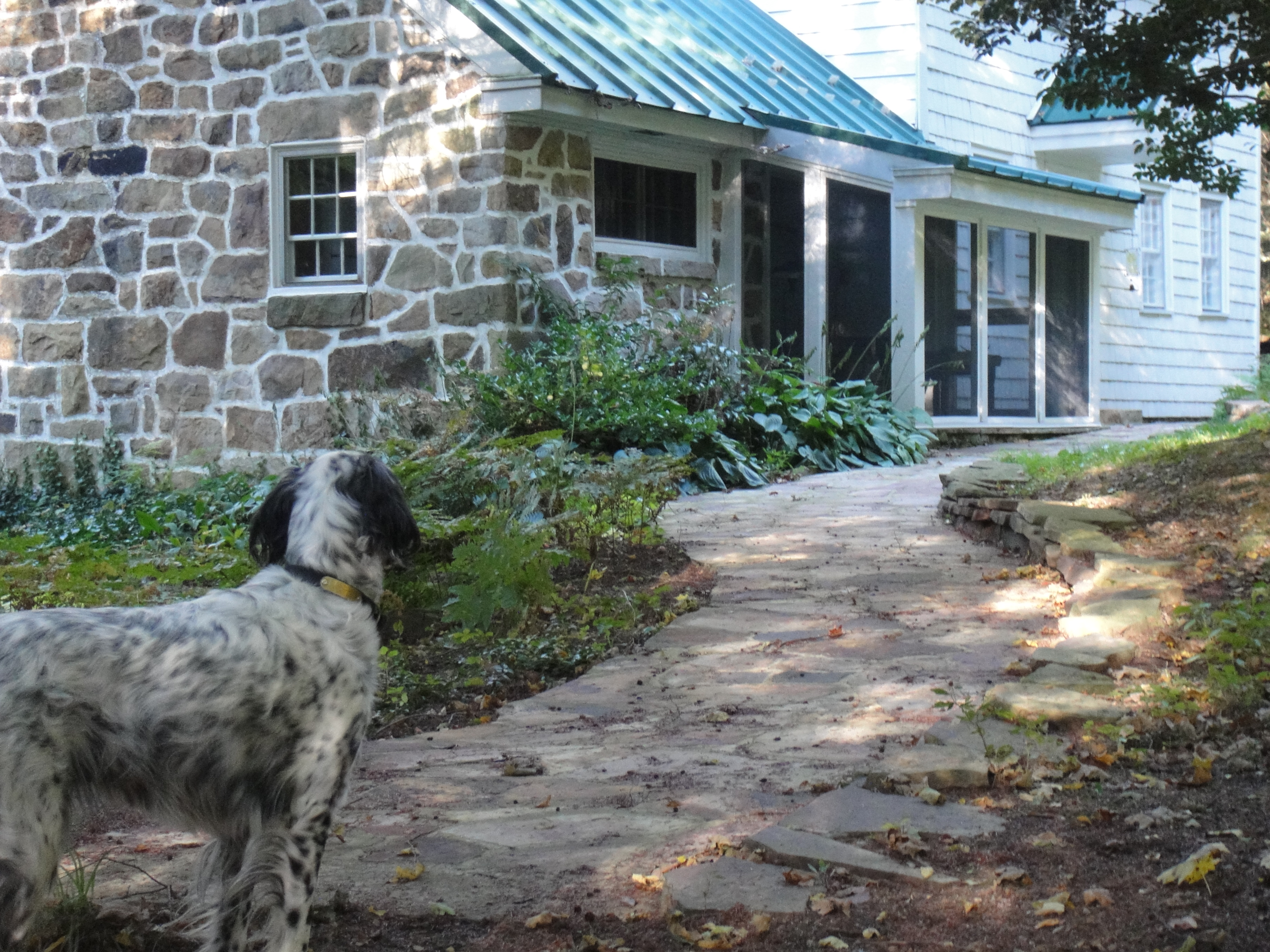

- Location within West Virginia Location within the United States
- Location: 17098 Brandonville Pike, Brandonville, West Virginia
- Coordinates: 39°38′54″N 79°37′2″W
- Area: 232 acres (94 ha)
- Built: 1782; 1939
- Architectural style: Log
- NRHP reference No.: 14001061
- Added to NRHP: December 16, 2014

Old Hemlock is a historic wildlife sanctuary on Brandonville Pike in Brandonville, West Virginia. It is an estate of 232 acres (94 ha), which includes a c. 1782 log house (one of the oldest in Preston County), that was owned from 1939 until his death in 1998 by George Bird Evans, a leading writer on the subject of bird hunting and bird dogs. Evans' writings had nationwide appeal, even though they were largely based in this region of the Allegheny Mountains. His estate is now owned by the Old Hemlock Foundation, established by his widow to preserve his legacy. The property is open for tours by appointment.

Old Hemlock was listed on the National Register of Historic Places in 2014.
