= Brandonville, West Virginia =

- Town
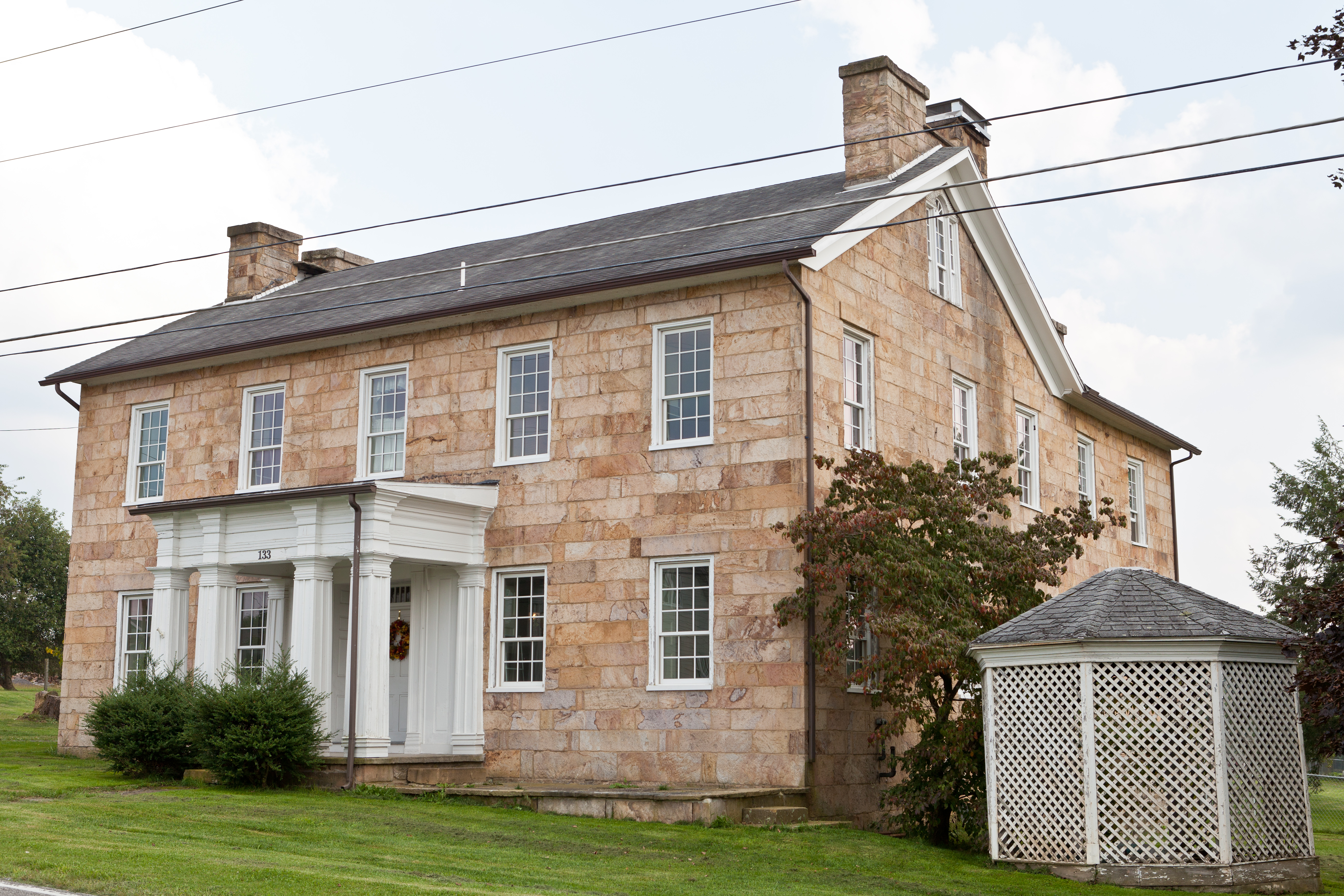
- Hagans Homestead (1830)

- Location of Brandonville in Preston County, West Virginia.
- Coordinates: 39°39′59″N 79°37′17″W
- Country: United States
- State: West Virginia
- County: Preston
- Laid out: 1827
- Chartered: 1858

Area
  - Total: 0.39 sq mi (1.00 km^{2})
  - Land: 0.39 sq mi (1.00 km^{2})
  - Water: 0 sq mi (0.00 km^{2})
- Elevation: 1,805 ft (550 m)

Population (2020)
  - Total: 129
  - Estimate (2021): 136
  - Density: 272.4/sq mi (105.19/km^{2})
- Time zone: UTC-5 (Eastern (EST))
  - Summer (DST): UTC-4 (EDT)
- ZIP code: 26525
- Area code: 304
- FIPS code: 54-09844
- GNIS feature ID: 1553965
- Website: https://local.wv.gov/brandonville/Pages/default.aspx

Brandonville is a town in northern Preston County, West Virginia, United States. The population was 136 at the 2020 census.

== History ==
Brandonville was laid out in 1827 by Jonathan Brandon, and named for him.

The Hagans Homestead was listed on the National Register of Historic Places in 1993.

The town made international headlines in 1987 when then mayor Clarence Fike issued civic election ballots with no names on them and "told everyone they could vote for themselves.

== Geography ==
Brandonville is located at 39°39′59″N 79°37′17″W (39.666321, -79.621517).

According to the United States Census Bureau, the town has a total area of 0.39 square miles (1.01 km^{2}), all land.

== Demographics ==
Historical population
Census	Pop.	Note	%±
1860	165		—
1870	100		−39.4%
1880	107		7.0%
1890	82		−23.4%
1900	68		−17.1%
1910	96		41.2%
1920	67		−30.2%
1930	82		22.4%
1940	113		37.8%
1950	100		−11.5%
1960	109		9.0%
1970	82		−24.8%
1980	92		12.2%
1990	73		−20.7%
2000	102		39.7%
2010	101		−1.0%
2020	129		27.7%
2021 (est.)	136	▲	5.4%
U.S. Decennial Census

=== 2010 census ===
At the 2010 census there were 101 people, 47 households, and 29 families living in the town. The population density was 259.0 inhabitants per square mile (100.0/km^{2}). There were 57 housing units at an average density of 146.2 per square mile (56.4/km^{2}). The racial makeup of the town was 95.0% White and 5.0% from other races. Hispanic or Latino of any race were 5.0%.

Of the 47 households 23.4% had children under the age of 18 living with them, 42.6% were married couples living together, 14.9% had a female householder with no husband present, 4.3% had a male householder with no wife present, and 38.3% were non-families. 31.9% of households were one person and 17.1% were one person aged 65 or older. The average household size was 2.15 and the average family size was 2.62.

The median age in the town was 41.9 years. 17.8% of residents were under the age of 18; 6% were between the ages of 18 and 24; 28.7% were from 25 to 44; 23.8% were from 45 to 64; and 23.8% were 65 or older. The gender makeup of the town was 47.5% male and 52.5% female.

=== 2000 census ===
At the 2000 census there were 102 people, 41 households, and 28 families living in the town. The population density was 259.3 inhabitants per square mile (101.0/km^{2}). There were 46 housing units at an average density of 116.9 per square mile (45.5/km^{2}). The racial makeup of the town was 97.06% White, and 2.94% from two or more races. Of the 41 households 26.8% had children under the age of 18 living with them, 46.3% were married couples living together, 17.1% had a female householder with no husband present, and 31.7% were non-families. 29.3% of households were one person and 17.1% were one person aged 65 or older. The average household size was 2.49 and the average family size was 3.04.

The age distribution was 25.5% under the age of 18, 6.9% from 18 to 24, 23.5% from 25 to 44, 21.6% from 45 to 64, and 22.5% 65 or older. The median age was 39 years. For every 100 females, there were 85.5 males. For every 100 females age 18 and over, there were 85.4 males.

The median household income was $28,125 and the median family income was $25,000. Males had a median income of $61,875 versus $17,917 for females. The per capita income for the town was $22,118. There were 17.6% of families and 24.5% of the population living below the poverty line, including 58.8% of under eighteens and 32.0% of those over 64.

== Notable people ==
- George Bird Evans, illustrator, mystery novelist, gunning and bird dog writer, and dog breeder
- Mrs. A. Elmore, writer, editor, temperance reformer, and philanthropist
