= Mrs. A. Elmore =

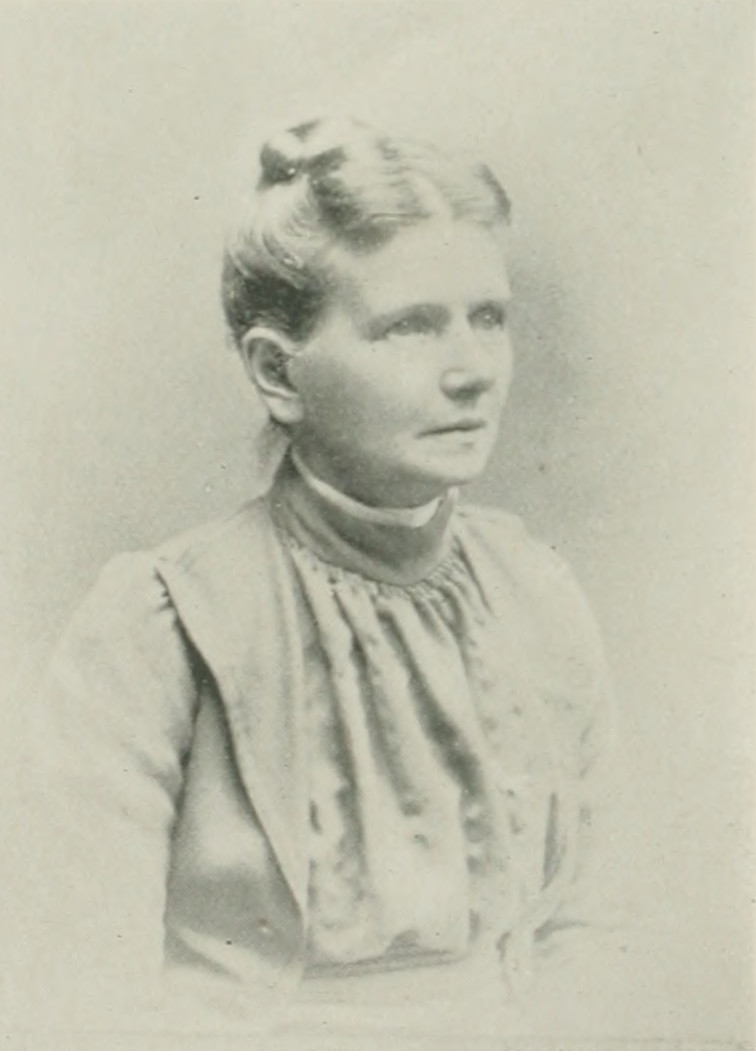
Photo in A Woman of the Century

Mrs. A. Elmore was the pen name of Ann Morrison Moore (née, Morrison; married name, Moore; March 29, 1829 – October 27, 1901), a radical American temperance reformer known also for her philanthropy, for her friendship with those who were oppressed, and for her extreme patriotism. She was a proprietor and editor of a monthly Prohibition magazine. She also wrote poetry and novels.

== Early life ==
Lucie Ann Morrison was born in Brandonville, Preston County, West Virginia, March 29, 1829. Her father, Chester Morrison (1809–1892), was a Methodist clergyman. Her mother was Civilla (née, Ludington) (1819–1900). Lucie had several younger siblings including Martha, Mary, James, Alfred, Chester, Civilla, and Monia.

== Career ==
A radical Woman's Christian Temperance Union (WCTU) woman, she was an eloquent and convincing speaker on temperance, social purity and anti-tobacco. She served as president of her local WCTU up until her death.

Elmore was widely known as a philanthropist. Even after she suffered financial reverses, she never stopped her charitable work.

Her chief literary works were her poems, one volume of which passed through a large edition. Her poems were published in the leading magazines. She was also the author of the popular story Billy's Mother. In addition, she held several editorial positions, including owner and editor of The Searchlight, a Prohibition monthly publication.

== Personal life ==
Her husband, A. E. L. Moore (1835–1868), served as an officer in the Union Army through the civil war. Her only child, Frances (1866–1867), died in infancy. Her home was in Englewood, New Jersey. She was an Episcopalian.

Ann Morrison Moore died in New Castle, Pennsylvania, October 27, 1901. Interment was in Greendale Cemetery, Meadville, Pennsylvania.

== Selected works ==
- A mother's story, 1879
- Billy's Mother, 1884
