= Bruceton Mills, West Virginia =

- Town
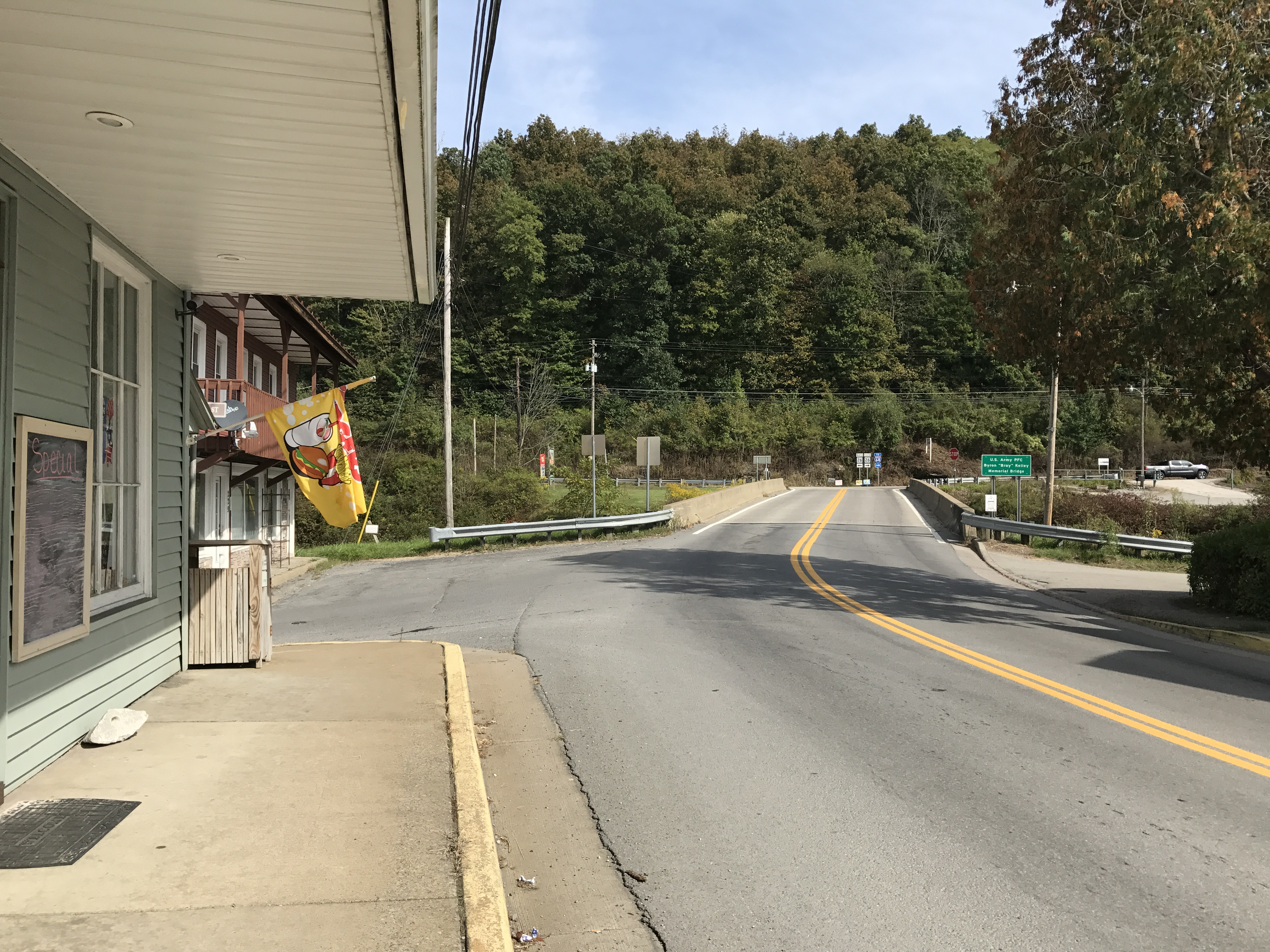
- Looking east from Morgantown Street toward North Preston Highway in Bruceton Mills

- Location of Bruceton Mills in Preston County, West Virginia
- Coordinates: 39°39′33″N 79°38′26″W
- Country: United States
- State: West Virginia
- County: Preston
- Chartered: 1853

Area
  - Total: 0.054 sq mi (0.14 km^{2})
  - Land: 0.054 sq mi (0.14 km^{2})
  - Water: 0 sq mi (0.00 km^{2})
- Elevation: 1,532 ft (467 m)

Population (2020)
  - Total: 63
  - Estimate (2021): 64
  - Density: 1,514.8/sq mi (584.87/km^{2})
- Time zone: UTC-5 (Eastern (EST))
  - Summer (DST): UTC-4 (EDT)
- ZIP code: 26525
- Area code: 304
- FIPS code: 54-10852
- GNIS feature ID: 1553998

Bruceton Mills is a town in northern Preston County, West Virginia, United States, along Big Sandy Creek. The population was 64 at the 2020 census, making it the second-least populous town in West Virginia, after Thurmond.

== History ==
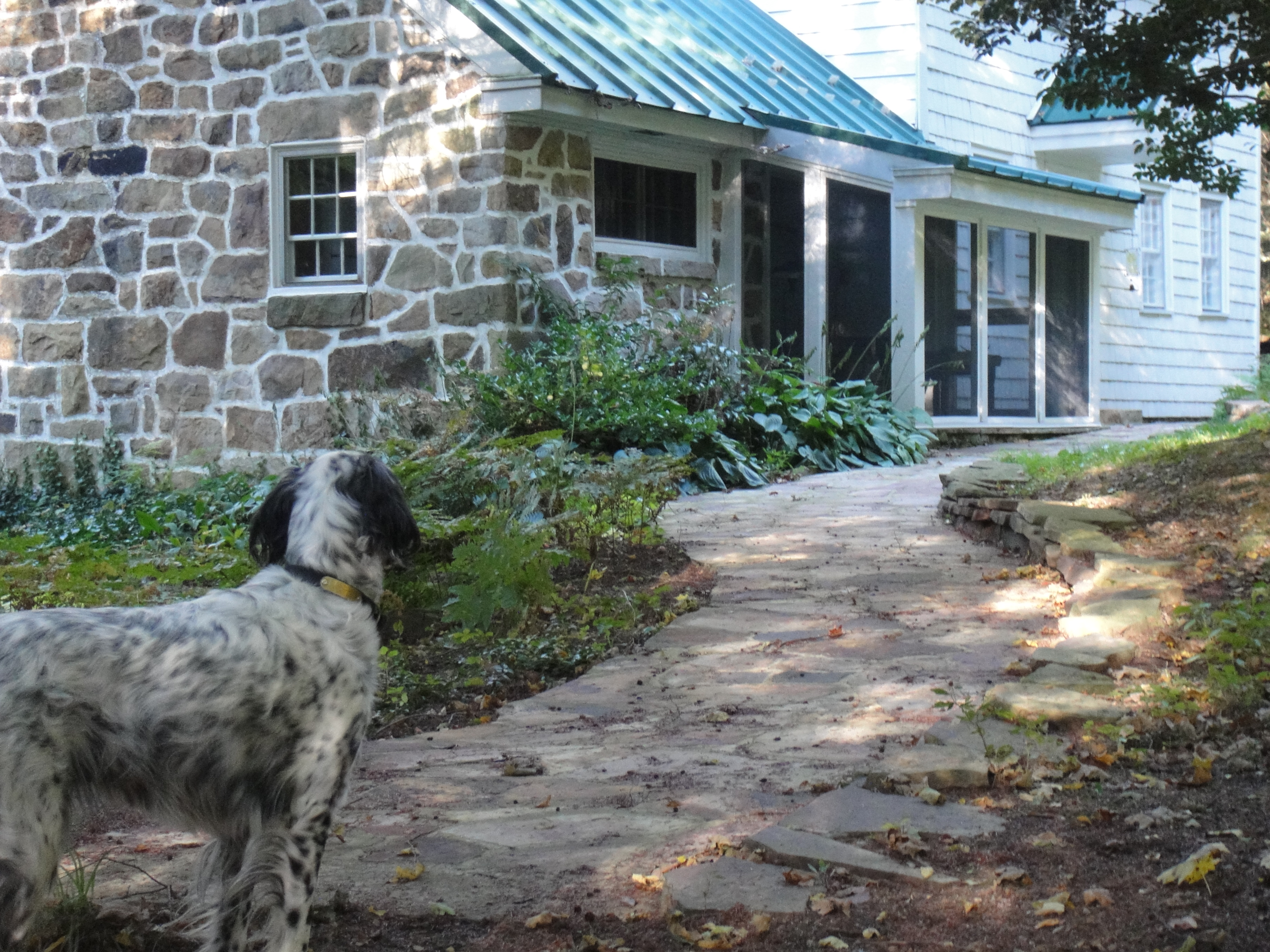
Old Hemlock southeast of Bruceton Mills

An early settler, John M. Hoffman, named this community for his stepfather, George Bruce, who claimed direct descendance from Robert the Bruce, King of Scotland. The post office existed in 1870. Bruceton Mills is the only place in the United States with this name.

== Geography ==
Bruceton Mills is located at 39°39′33″N 79°38′26″W (39.659111, -79.640693).

According to the United States Census Bureau, the town has a total area of 0.06 square miles (0.16 km^{2}), all land.

=== Climate ===
The climate in this area has mild differences between highs and lows, and there is adequate rainfall year-round. According to the Köppen Climate Classification system, Bruceton Mills has a marine west coast climate, abbreviated "Cfb" on climate maps.

== Demographics ==
Historical population
Census	Pop.	Note	%±
1880	84		—
1900	80		—
1910	116		45.0%
1920	106		−8.6%
1930	116		9.4%
1940	165		42.2%
1950	165		0.0%
1960	209		26.7%
1970	209		0.0%
1980	296		41.6%
1990	132		−55.4%
2000	74		−43.9%
2010	85		14.9%
2020	63		−25.9%
2021 (est.)	64	▲	1.6%
U.S. Decennial Census

=== 2010 census ===
As of the census of 2010, there were 85 people, 42 households, and 22 families living in the town. The population density was 1,416.7 inhabitants per square mile (547.0/km^{2}). There were 47 housing units at an average density of 783.3 per square mile (302.4/km^{2}). The racial makeup of the town was 100.0% White.

There were 42 households, of which 28.6% had children under the age of 18 living with them, 40.5% were married couples living together, 11.9% had a female householder with no husband present, and 47.6% were non-families. 45.2% of all households were made up of individuals, and 21.4% had someone living alone who was 65 years of age or older. The average household size was 2.02 and the average family size was 2.73.

The median age in the town was 41.4 years. 17.6% of residents were under the age of 18; 14.1% were between the ages of 18 and 24; 27.1% were from 25 to 44; 17.6% were from 45 to 64; and 23.5% were 65 years of age or older. The gender makeup of the town was 34.1% male and 65.9% female.

=== 2000 census ===
As of the census of 2000, there were 74 people, 39 households, and 20 families living in the town. The population density was 1,334.0 inhabitants per square mile (476.2/km^{2}). There were 44 housing units at an average density of 793.2 per square mile (283.1/km^{2}). The racial makeup of the town was 100.00% White.

There were 39 households, out of which 15.4% had children under the age of 18 living with them, 46.2% were married couples living together, 5.1% had a female householder with no husband present, and 46.2% were non-families. 43.6% of all households were made up of individuals, and 28.2% had someone living alone who was 65 years of age or older. The average household size was 1.90 and the average family size was 2.62.

In the town, the population was spread out, with 10.8% under the age of 18, 9.5% from 18 to 24, 23.0% from 25 to 44, 36.5% from 45 to 64, and 20.3% who were 65 years of age or older. The median age was 48 years. For every 100 females, there were 80.5 males. For every 100 females age 18 and over, there were 73.7 males.

The median income for a household in the town was $25,625, and the median income for a family was $38,333. Males had a median income of $35,417 versus $21,875 for females. The per capita income for the town was $17,369. There were no families and 6.2% of the population living below the poverty line, including no under eighteens and 22.2% of those over 64.
