= Hagans Homestead =

Historic house in West Virginia, United States

- U.S. National Register of Historic Places
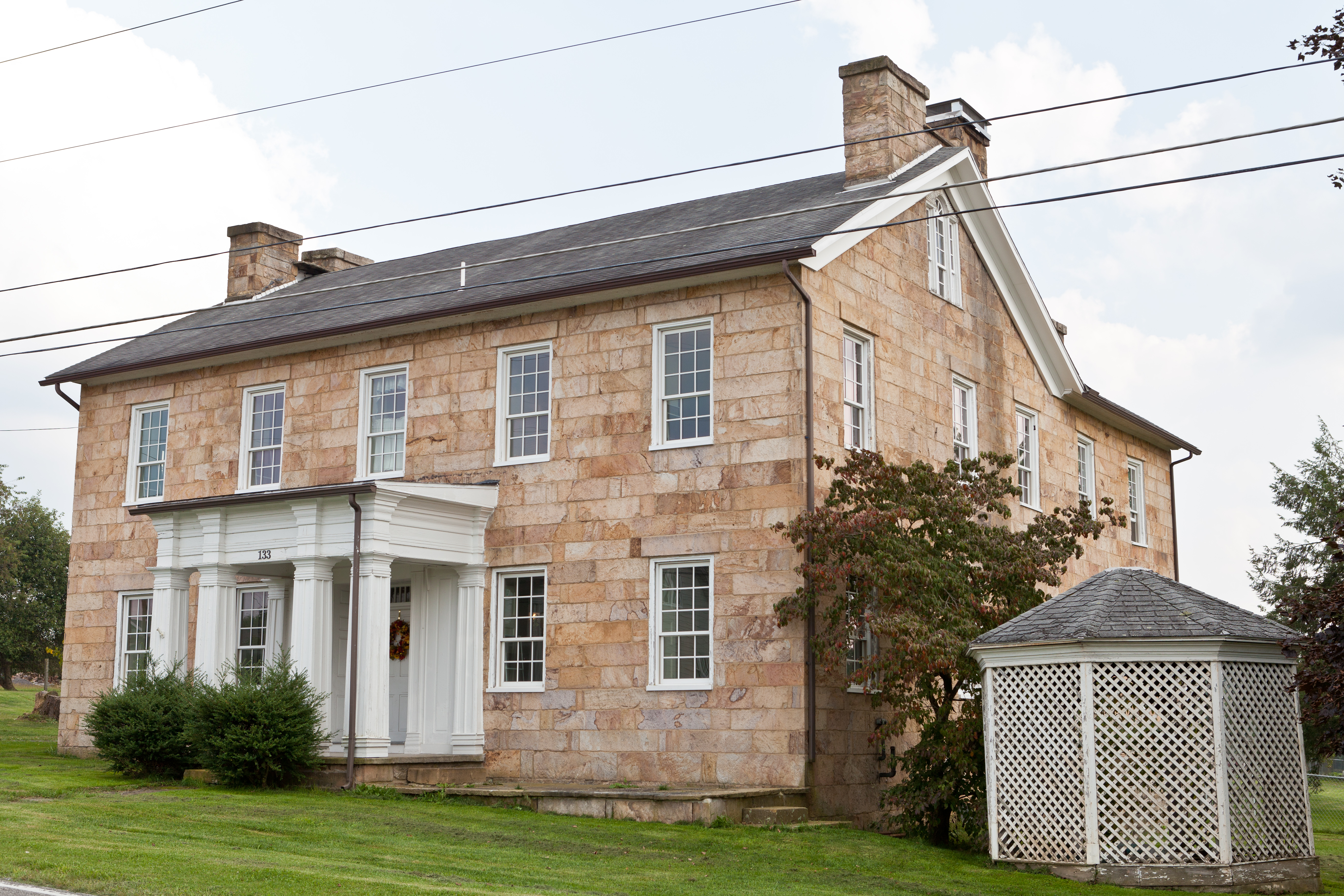

- Location within West Virginia Location within the United States
- Location: WV 26, 1 mi. N of jct. with I-68E (Exit 23), Brandonville, West Virginia
- Coordinates: 39°39′56″N 79°37′22″W
- Area: 1.1 acres (0.45 ha)
- Built: 1830; 196 years ago
- Architect: I. Newlon, C. Fuller
- Architectural style: Greek Revival
- NRHP reference No.: 93000617
- Added to NRHP: July 14, 1993

Hagans Homestead, also known as Barnes Hotel and Stone Manor Tourist Home, is a historic home located at Brandonville, Preston County, West Virginia. It was built in 1830, and is a large 2 1/2-story, L-shaped house built of native cut sandstone. It consists of a main block, measuring 28 by 24 feet (8.5 by 7.3 m), with a 1 1/2-story frame addition measuring 20 by 20 feet (6.1 by 6.1 m) feet. Also on the property is a Victorian gazebo, originally built as a well house. Built originally as a single-family dwelling, the Barnes family maintained the house as a hotel during the early 1900s, then later a tourist home in the 1940s and 1950s. It was divided into two apartments during the 1960s, then returned to a single-family home after 1970.

It was listed on the National Register of Historic Places in 1993.
