= George Bird Evans =

American novelist (1906–1998)

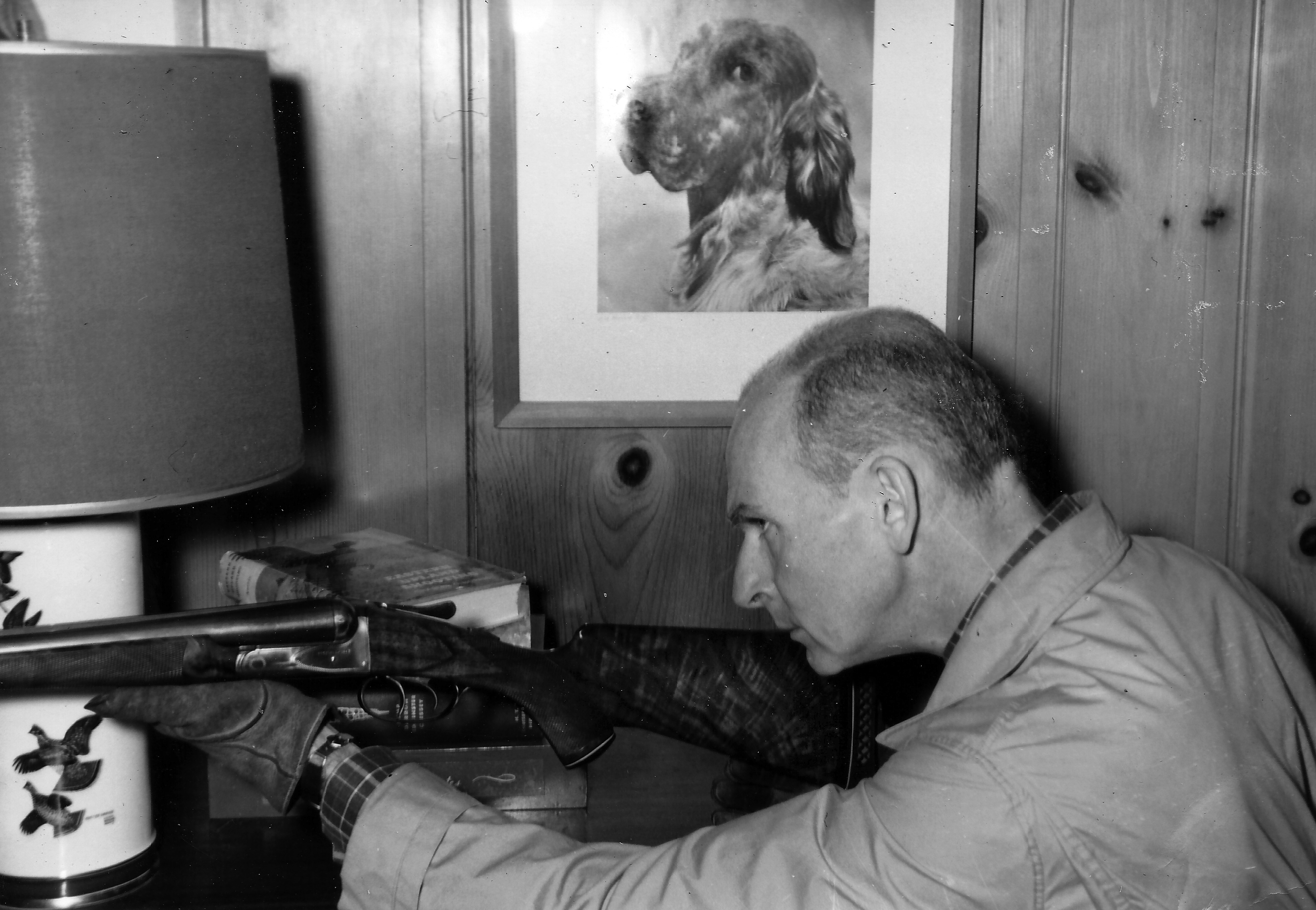
- Evans at Old Hemlock Farm
- Born: 28 December 1906; Uniontown, Pennsylvania, U.S.
- Died: 5 May 1998 (aged 91); Bruceton Mills, West Virginia, U.S.
- Occupations: Illustrator; writer; sportsman
- Spouse: Kay Harris Evans
- Parent(s): George Washington Bird Evans, Eve Hunt Evans

Signature
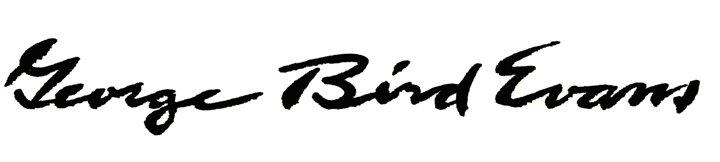

George Bird Evans (28 December 1906 – 5 May 1998) was an American writer, artist, dog breeder, and sportsman. Evans' most notable contributions are in the area of upland gunning with English Setters. Over the course of his career, Evans authored or edited over two dozen books and scores of magazine articles on this subject, becoming one of the world's best recognized authorities on upland gunning and bird dogs.

Evans' career also included success as an artist, providing illustrations for Cosmopolitan, American, Woman's Home Companion, and Redbook.

As a dog breeder, Evans created the Old Hemlock line of English Setters whose progeny continue to be prized by hunters across the United States for their bird hunting abilities.

== Early life ==
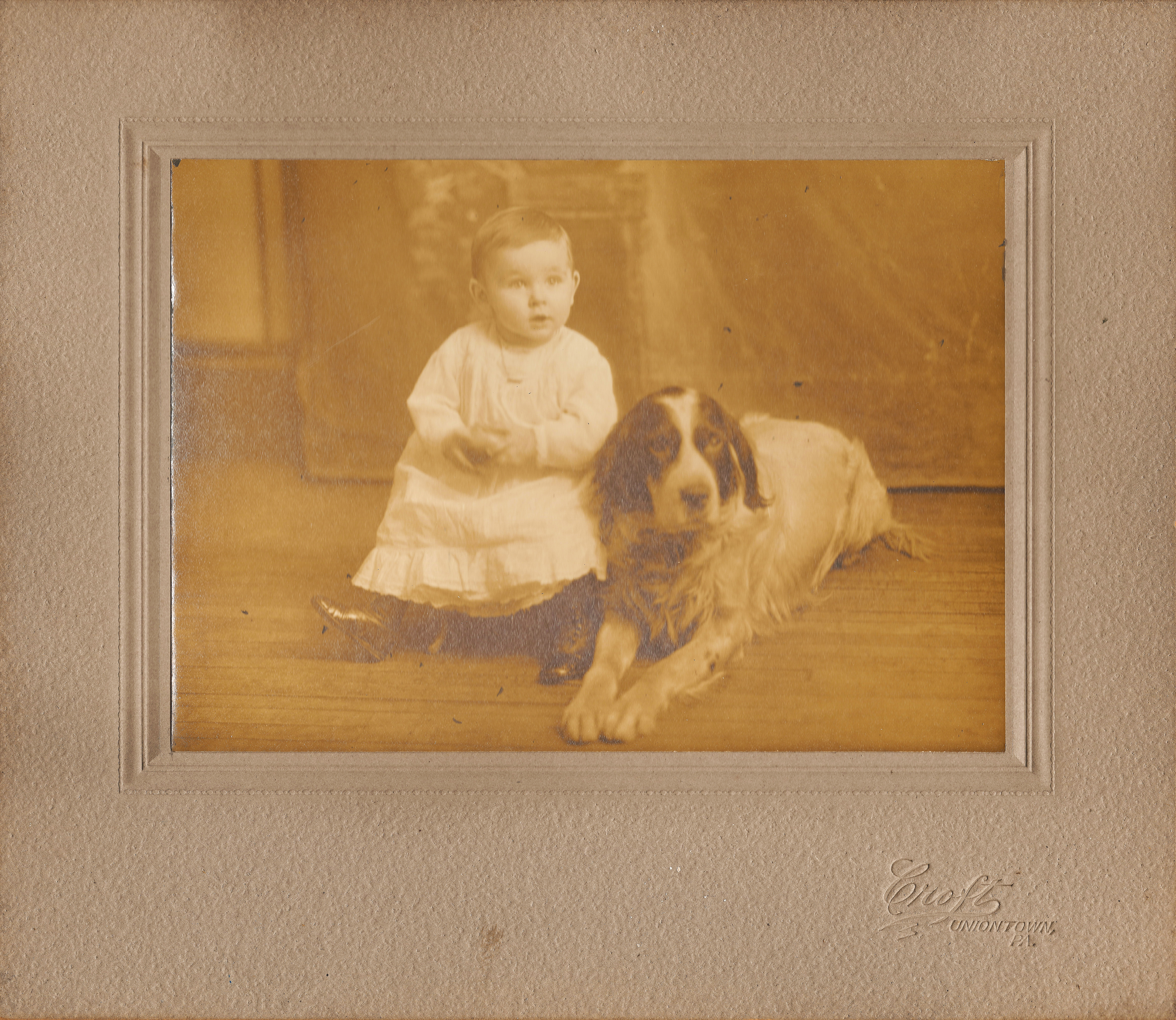
Evans as an infant, with a setter

George Bird Evans was born in Uniontown, Pennsylvania, on December 28, 1906, to George Washington Bird Evans and Eve Hunt Evans. He grew up as an only child. Evans' father was a tailor by trade; it was from him that Evans learned to hunt and work with bird dogs.

== Education ==
Evans enrolled at Carnegie Institute in Pittsburgh in 1924, planning to pursue a career as an artist. A year later, he transferred to the Chicago Art Institute, but left before graduating to start his art career in New York City in 1927.

== Career ==
=== Artist ===
In New York City, Evans found work freelancing for a variety of publications. He spent the next eleven years in New York working as a freelance artist until he signed an exclusive contract with Cosmopolitan in 1938 to illustrate mystery and detective stories.

In 1939, Evans moved from New York City to a Revolutionary War-era farmhouse (which he named "Old Hemlock") in Preston County, West Virginia, the better to pursue his love of hunting. He continued to provide illustrations under contract to Cosmopolitan.

Works by George Bird Evans

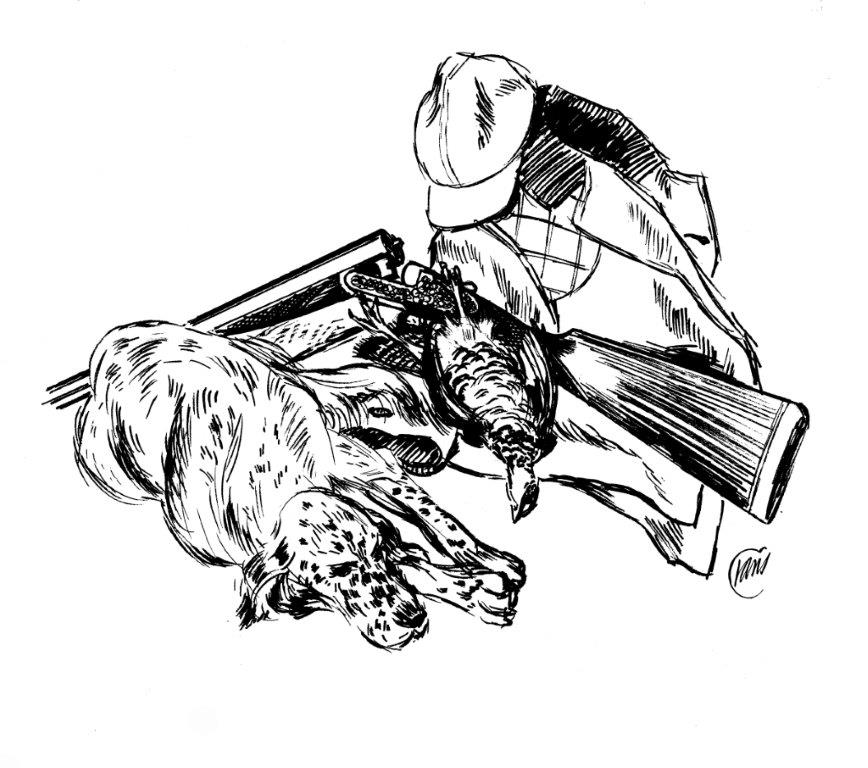
Setter Still Life

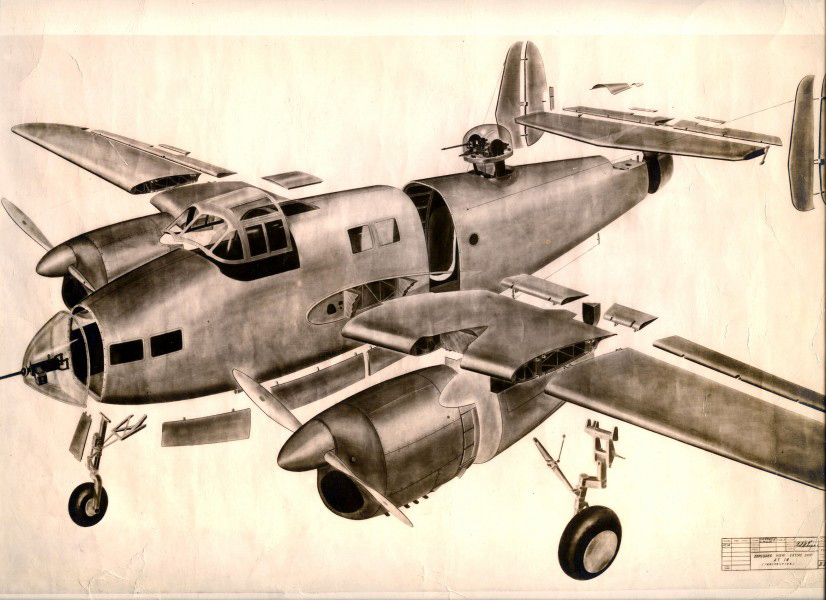
Navy Illustration

=== Navy ===
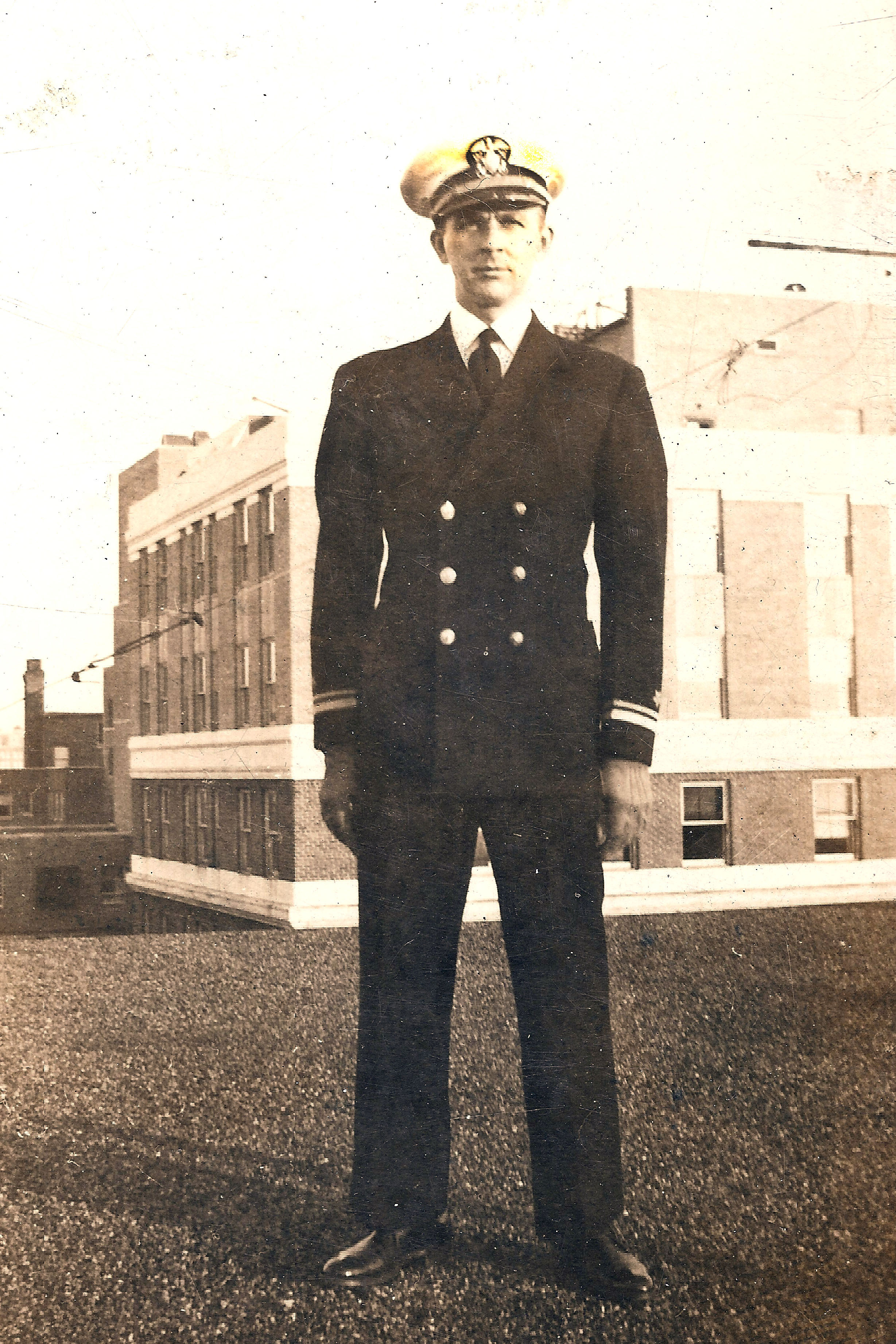
George in Navy Uniform

Evans was commissioned as a LTJG in the United States Navy during World War II, and based on his portfolio of earlier work for Fairchild Aircraft, was assigned to the Navy's Bureau of Aeronautics Engineering Division, where he illustrated equipment repair manuals. At the end of the War, Evans returned to Old Hemlock near Brandonville, WV.

=== Dog breeder ===
Unable to find English Setters to suit his desires, Evans set out to breed his own variety which would combine a natural ability to handle ruffed grouse, while possessing some of the beauty George believed to have been lost in the field trial dogs of the era. Beginning with "Blue", a blue belton with Llewellyn and George's Ryman's Sir Roger DeCoverley blood, and "Dawn", an orange belton contributing a mixture of English dual bench and field blood that Evans' father had found in Pittsburgh, Evans started his breeding program. The first brood of nine puppies has proven to be the beginning of a long line of prized bird dogs, continued through line breeding.

=== Author ===
After he returned to West Virginia at the end of World War II, as the magazine industry turned more towards photography, Evans found less and less work illustrating magazine stories. Instead, he turned to writing. Evans worked both as a novelist, producing mystery novels and stories with his wife, Kay Harris Evans, under the pseudonym Brandon Bird (and later Harris Evans), and later as a non-fiction writer, writing on the topics of upland bird hunting and bird dogs.

Evans' mystery writing began with Never Wake a Dead Man (1950), in which he introduced the characters of Hamp and Carmel, modeled after himself and his wife, who, while on a hunting outing, come upon a multiple murder mystery that they set out to solve. The pair, with their dog Ruff, appeared in a series of novels published by Don Meade in the Red Badge Series.

In addition to his co-written mystery novels, Evans also authored a number of non-fiction books and articles on the subject of shooting, hunting and bird dogs. His first article, "Design for Setters", was published in the December 1956 issue of Field and Stream. Evans would go on to publish, on average, three articles per year in various magazines read across the country, mostly in Field and Stream and Pennsylvania Game News.

In 1971, Evans published his first monograph. The Upland Shooting Life was a combination of manifesto, autobiography, manual, and wildlife romance all at once. In it, Evans lays out his philosophy and ethics of bird hunting as a "way of life." Evans' code of honor demanded respect and fairness in the hunt. He wrote:

If I could shoot a game bird and still not hurt it, the way I can take a trout and release it, I doubt if I would kill another one.

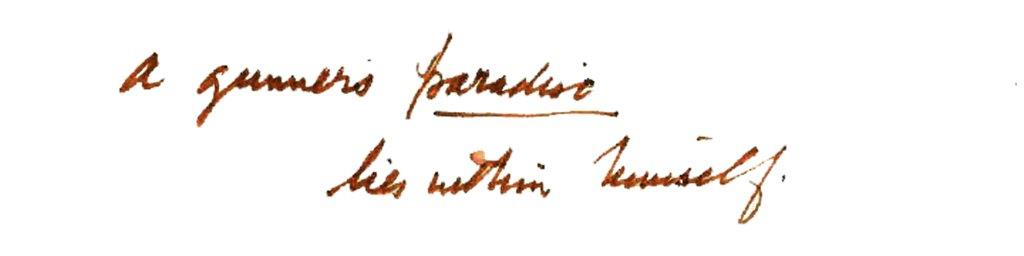
"A gunner's paradise lies within himself"

== The Old Hemlock Foundation ==
The Evanses formed the Old Hemlock Foundation as a philanthropic non-profit. The Foundation makes distributions to non-profit organizations to support scholarships and charitable educational purposes, and it maintains the Evans' "Old Hemlock" property: 230 acres (93 ha) of real estate in Preston County, West Virginia, containing virgin old-growth hemlock trees that is maintained as a nature and wildlife preserve.

At the death of Kay Evans in 2008, the Old Hemlock Foundation was established. Directors were appointed who are working to meet the mission of the Evans' wishes to preserve the house and land while providing funds for scholarships and local humane society and cultural programs at the local school. The Old Hemlock Foundation purposes include charitable, scientific and educational activities.

Old Hemlock

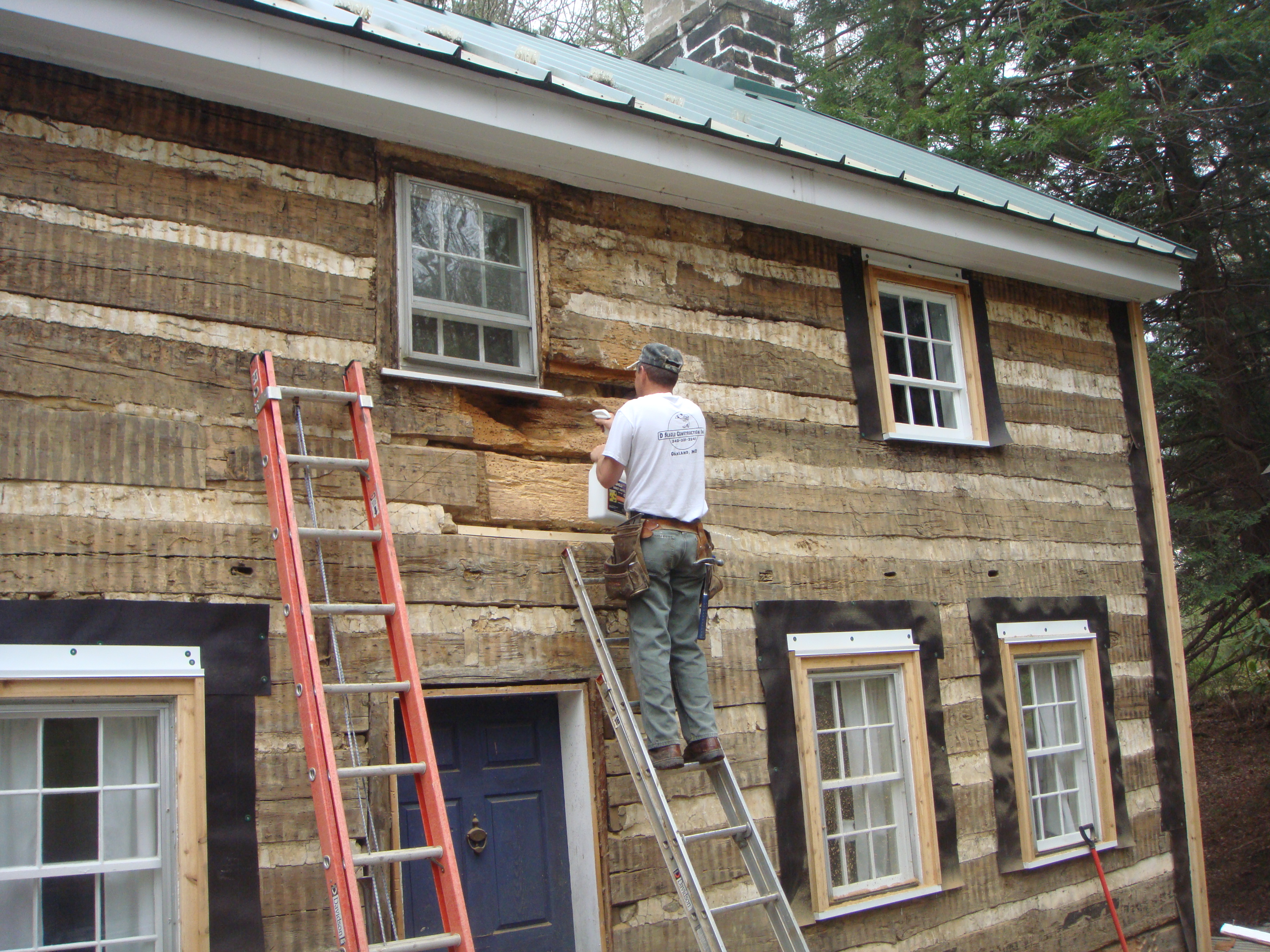
Old Hemlock Farmhouse before restoration

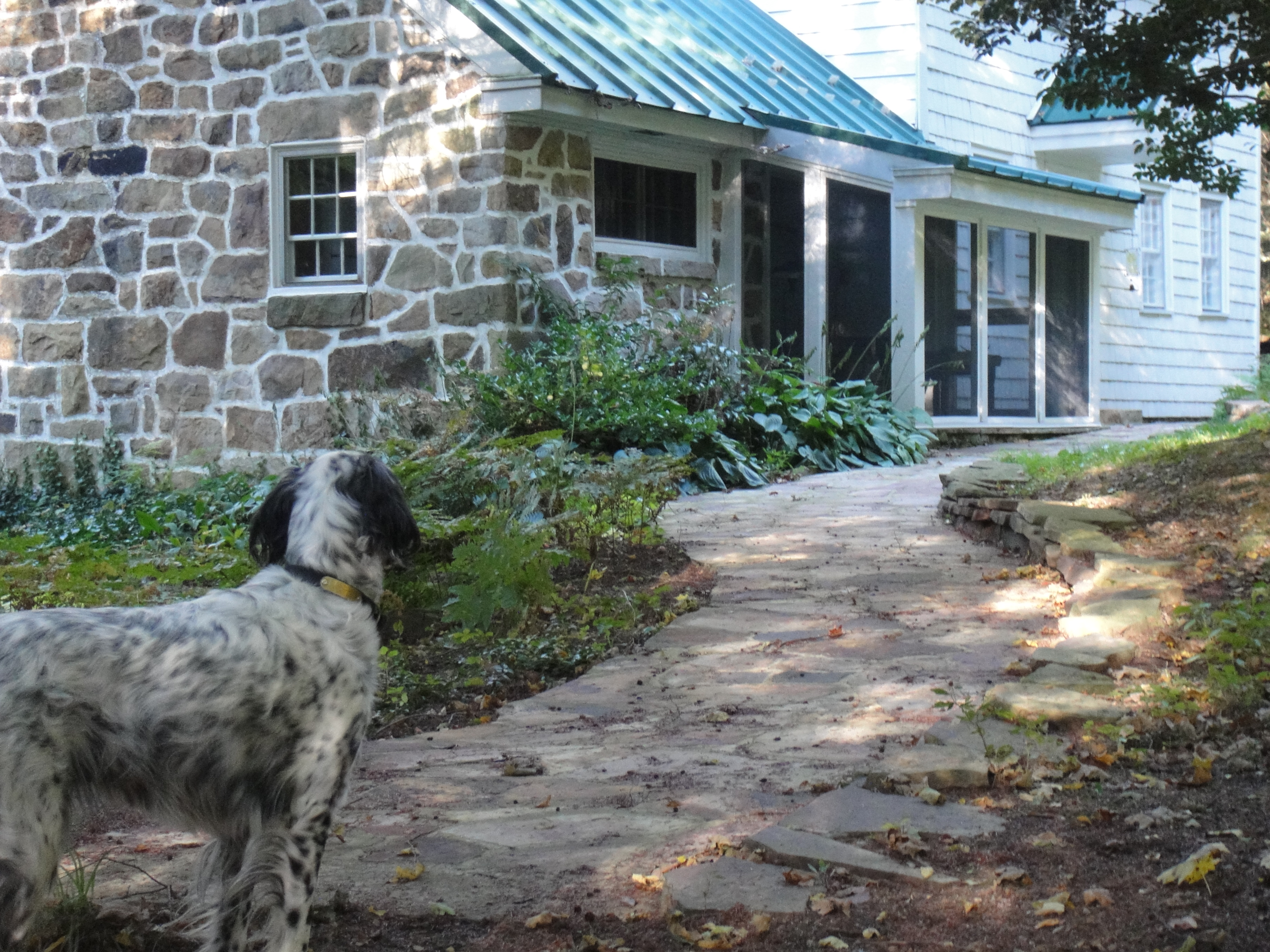
Old Hemlock Farmhouse after restoration

== Personal ==
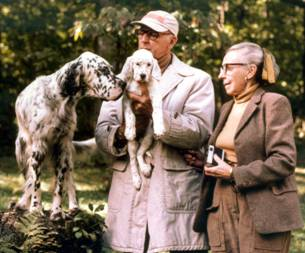
George and Kay with dogs

Evans married Kay Harris of Wheeling, West Virginia, with whom he co-wrote his mystery novels. They had no children.

== Selected bibliography ==
=== Books ===
Old Hemlock Mystery Quintet

1. Death In Four Colors (as Brandon Bird; Dodd, Mead & Co., New York, 1950)
2. Never Wake A Dead Man (as Brandon Bird; Dodd, Mead & Co., New York, 1950)
3. Downbeat For A Dirge (as Brandon Bird; Dodd, Mead & Co., New York, 1952)
4. Hawk Watch (as Brandon Bird; Dodd, Mead & Co., New York, 1954)
5. The Pink Carrara (as Harris Evans; Dodd, Mead & Co., New York, 1960)

Upland Gunning

- The Upland Shooting Life (Alfred A. Knopf, New York: 1971)
- The Best of Nash Buckingham (Winchester Press, Tulsa: 1973)
- Troubles With Bird Dogs (Winchester Press, Tulsa: 1975)
- The Ruffed Grouse Book (Amwell Press, Clinton, NJ: 1977)
- The Woodcock Book (Amwell Press, Clinton, NJ: 1977)
- Recollections of a Shooting Guest (Amwell Press, Clinton, NJ: 1978)
- The Bird Dog Book (Amwell Press, Clinton, NJ: 1979)
- The Upland Gunner's Book (Amwell Press, Clinton, NJ: 1979)
- An Affair With Grouse (Amwell Press, Clinton, NJ: 1982)
- Men Who Shot (Old Hemlock: 1983)
- Nash Buckingham's Letters to John Bailey (Old Hemlock: 1984)
- Troubles With Bird Dogs (Old Hemlock: 1985)
- Grouse Along The Tramroad (Old Hemlock: 1986)
- A Dog, A Gun, and Time Enough (Old Hemlock: 1987)
- October Fever (Old Hemlock: 1989)
- GBE Introduces (Old Hemlock: 1990)
- Living With Gun Dogs (Old Hemlock: 1992)
- Grouse On The Mountain (Old Hemlock: 1994)
- From My Covers: 22 selections from the Old Hemlock collection sporting books and myserty novels (Old Hemlock: 1995)
- Grouse & Woodcock in the Blackwater/Canaan (Old Hemlock: 1997)

== Sources ==
- "Evans, George Bird. Biographical Sketch" (PDF). The Upland Shooting Life. Archived from the original (PDF) on 2014-12-14.
- Evans, George Bird (1994). Grouse on the Mountain. Brandonville, WV: Old Hemlock.
- Evans, George Bird (1975). Troubles with Bird Dogs. New York: Winchester Press.
- Evans, Kay & George Bird (1996). The Old Hemlock Mystery Quintet.
- Hall, David L. (ed.). An Anthology of George Bird Evans/Old Hemlock Publications.
- Ross, Peggy (18 October 2012). "George Bird Evans". e-WV: The West Virginia Encyclopedia.
- "Finding Aid For: Evans, George Bird. Papers, 1932-2013". Guide to Archives and Manuscript Collections. West Virginia & Regional History Collection. Archived from the original on 29 November 2014.
