= Elk Fork (Point Pleasant Creek tributary) =

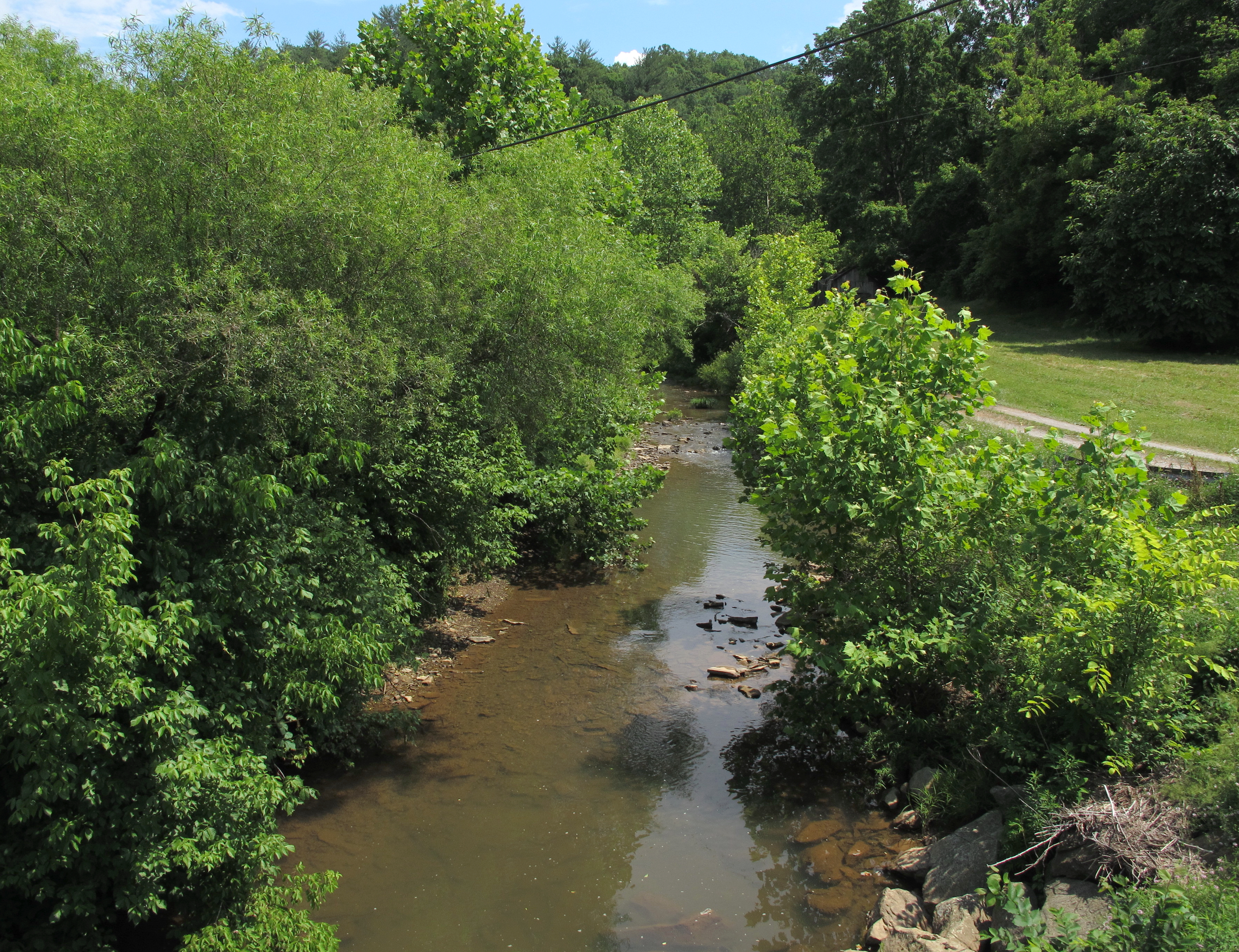
- Elk Fork near Polard

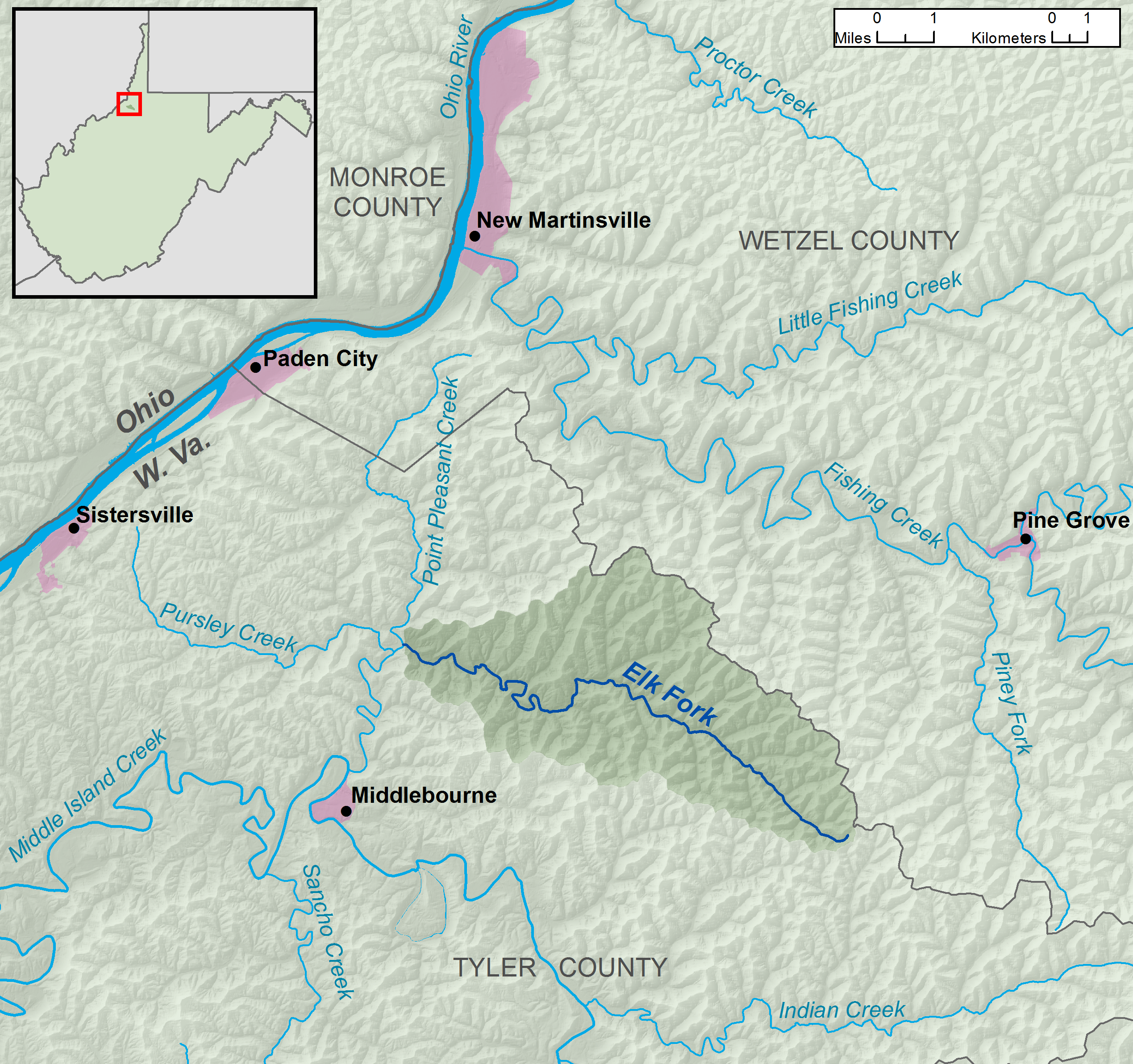
- A map of the Elk Fork and its watershed

Location
- Country: United States
- State: West Virginia
- County: Tyler

Physical characteristics
- Source
  - location: northeast of Link
  - coordinates: 39.4900809°N 80.7362138°W
  - elevation: 1,095 ft (334 m)
- Mouth: Point Pleasant Creek
  - location: near Kidwell
  - coordinates: 39.5359109°N 80.8851050°W
  - elevation: 682 ft (208 m)
- Length: 14.8 mi (23.8 km)
- Basin size: 21.1 sq mi (55 km^{2})

Basin features
- Hydrologic Unit Code: 050302010502 (USGS)

The Elk Fork is a tributary of Point Pleasant Creek, 14.8 miles (23.8 km) long, in northwestern West Virginia in the United States. Via Point Pleasant Creek, Middle Island Creek, and the Ohio River, it is part of the watershed of the Mississippi River, draining an area of 21.1 square miles (55 km^{2}) in a rural region on the unglaciated portion of the Allegheny Plateau.

The Elk Fork's entire course and watershed are in Tyler County. It rises approximately 0.7 miles (1.1 km) northeast of Link, and flows generally west-northwestward through the northern part of the county, through the unincorporated communities of Conaway, Iuka, Lonetree, and Polard. It flows into Point Pleasant Creek from the east near the community of Kidwell.

== See also ==
- List of rivers of West Virginia
