= Point Pleasant Creek =

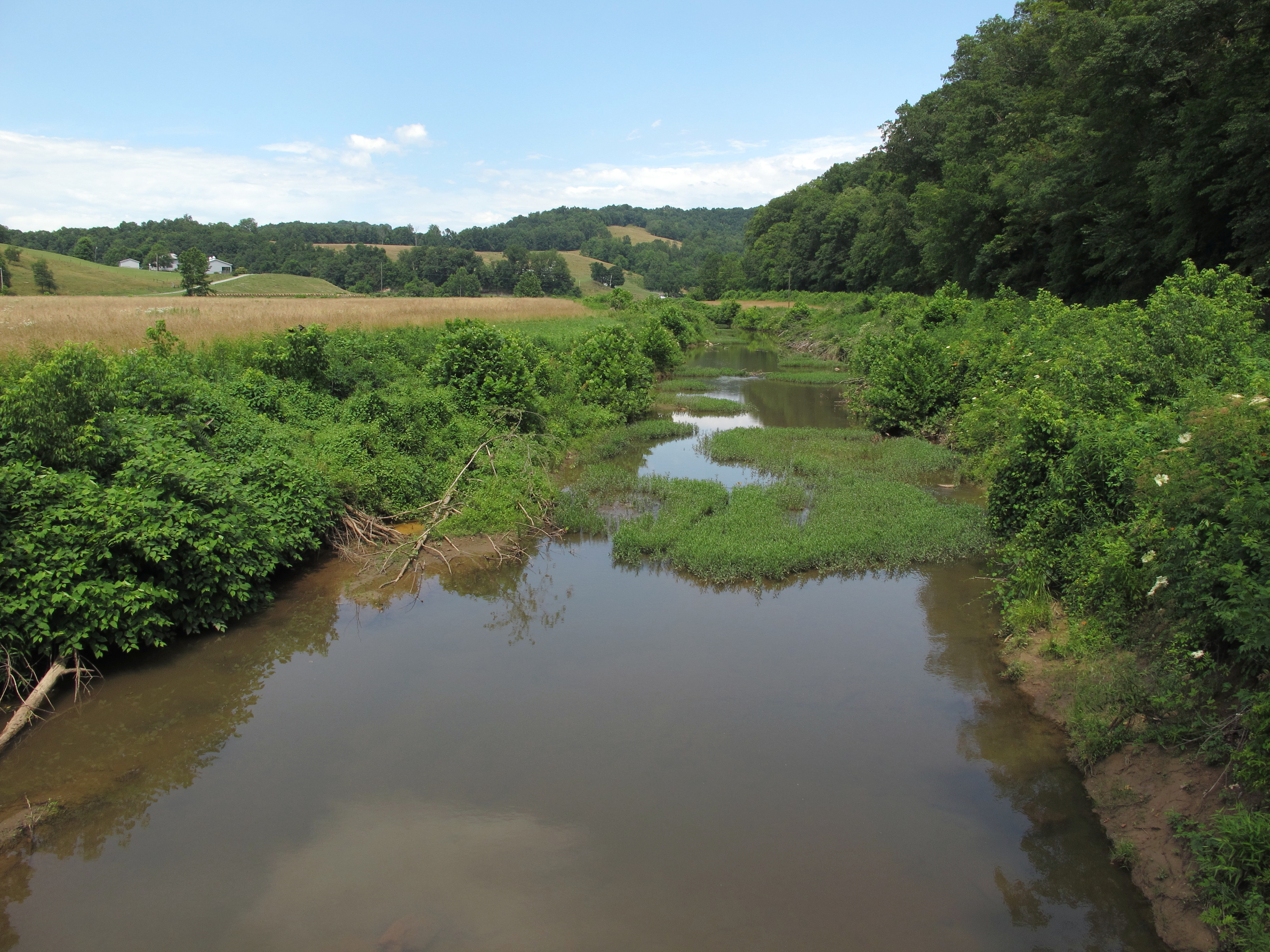
- Point Pleasant Creek in Kidwell

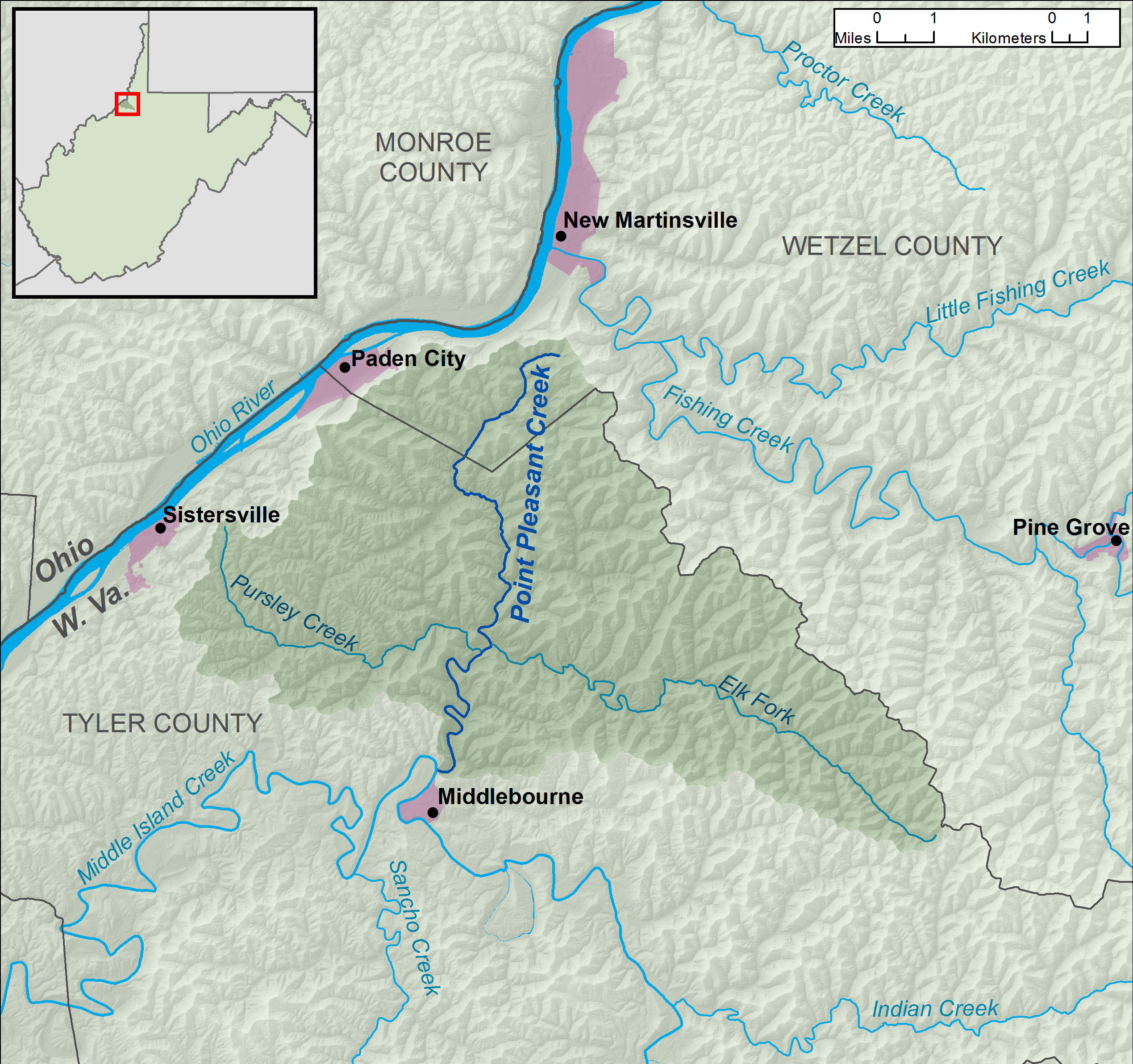
- A map of Point Pleasant Creek and its watershed

Location
- Country: United States
- State: West Virginia
- Counties: Wetzel, Tyler

Physical characteristics
- Source
  - location: south of New Martinsville, Wetzel County
  - coordinates: 39.6111883°N 80.8634343°W
  - elevation: 987 ft (301 m)
- Mouth: Middle Island Creek
  - location: Middlebourne, Tyler County
  - coordinates: 39.5036887°N 80.9028846°W
  - elevation: 663 ft (202 m)
- Length: 10.4 mi (16.7 km)
- Basin size: 60.5 sq mi (157 km^{2})

Basin features
- Tributaries
  - left: Elk Fork
- Hydrologic Unit Codes: 050302010502, 050302010503 (USGS)

Point Pleasant Creek is a tributary of Middle Island Creek, 10.4 miles (16.7 km) long, in northwestern West Virginia in the United States. Via Middle Island Creek and the Ohio River, it is part of the watershed of the Mississippi River, draining an area of 60.5 square miles (157 km^{2}) in a rural region on the unglaciated portion of the Allegheny Plateau.

Point Pleasant Creek rises in southwestern Wetzel County, approximately 2 miles (3.2 km) south of New Martinsville, and flows southward into Tyler County and through the unincorporated community of Kidwell, near which it collects its largest tributary, the Elk Fork. It flows into Middle Island Creek on the northern boundary of the town of Middlebourne. Upstream of Kidwell, it is paralleled by West Virginia Route 180; for the remainder of its course it is mostly paralleled by West Virginia Route 18.

== See also ==
- List of rivers of West Virginia
