= Centerville, Tyler County, West Virginia =

Unincorporated community in West Virginia, United States

Centerville, West Virginia
- Unincorporated community
- Location within West Virginia Location within the United States
- Coordinates: 39°25′55″N 80°50′24″W
- Country: United States
- State: West Virginia
- County: Tyler
- Incorporated: 1899
- Elevation: 764 ft (233 m)
- Time zone: UTC-5 (Eastern (EST))
  - Summer (DST): UTC-4 (EDT)
- ZIP code: 26320
- Area codes: 304 & 681
- GNIS feature ID: 1554098

Centerville (Formerly Ripley Mills) — also known as Alma — is an unincorporated community in Tyler County, West Virginia, United States. Centerville is located along West Virginia Route 18, 5.4 miles (8.7 km) southeast of Middlebourne. Centerville has a post office with ZIP code 26320; the post office uses the name Alma.

== History ==
The Centerville/Alma area is where three streams (McElroy Creek, Wheeler Run and Conaway Run) flow into Middle Island Creek within a short distance of one another. The earliest white settler was John McElroy who gave his name to McElroy Creek and was killed by Indians there. This was likely in the early 1790s, as the natives had effectively been expelled by 1795. William Underwood (1780-1866) and his family settled there on 23 March 1812. He had been appointed constable of the McElroy District and was granted 2000 acres of land on McElroy. He was also appointed Captain of the Virginia militia in the same year. He served as Justice of the Peace there for 37 years. In April 1840, "Squire" Underwood hosted John Brown (1800–59) — later the famous abolitionist and terrorist — who was in the area scouting land and properties. Centerville was incorporated by the circuit court in 1899.
