= Luzon (disambiguation) =

Luzon is the largest island in the Philippines. Luzon may also refer to:

== Places ==
- Luzon Strait between Taiwan and Luzon island
- Urban Luzon on Luzon island
- Luzon island group: Luzon plus other islands nearby
- Luzón, a municipality in Castile-La Mancha, Spain
- Luzon, West Virginia, an unincorporated community

== In the military ==
- Battle of Luzon, a World War II battle between the Allies and Japan
- USS Luzon (PG-47), a United States Navy gunboat
- USS Luzon (ARG-2), a United States Navy repair ship

== Buildings ==
- Luzon Apartment Building, Washington, DC
- Luzon Building, Tacoma, Washington state

== People ==
- Luzon B. Morris (1827-1895), American lawyer and Connecticut governor
- Luzon Sukezaemon (1565?-?), Japanese businessman
- Avraham Luzon (born 1955), Israeli football executive
- Guy Luzon (born 1975), Israeli football coach and former player
- Omri Luzon (born 1999), Israeli footballer
- Yaniv Luzon (born 1981), Israeli footballer
- Manila Luzon (born 1981), American drag queen and reality television personality
