= McElroy Creek =

River in the United States of America

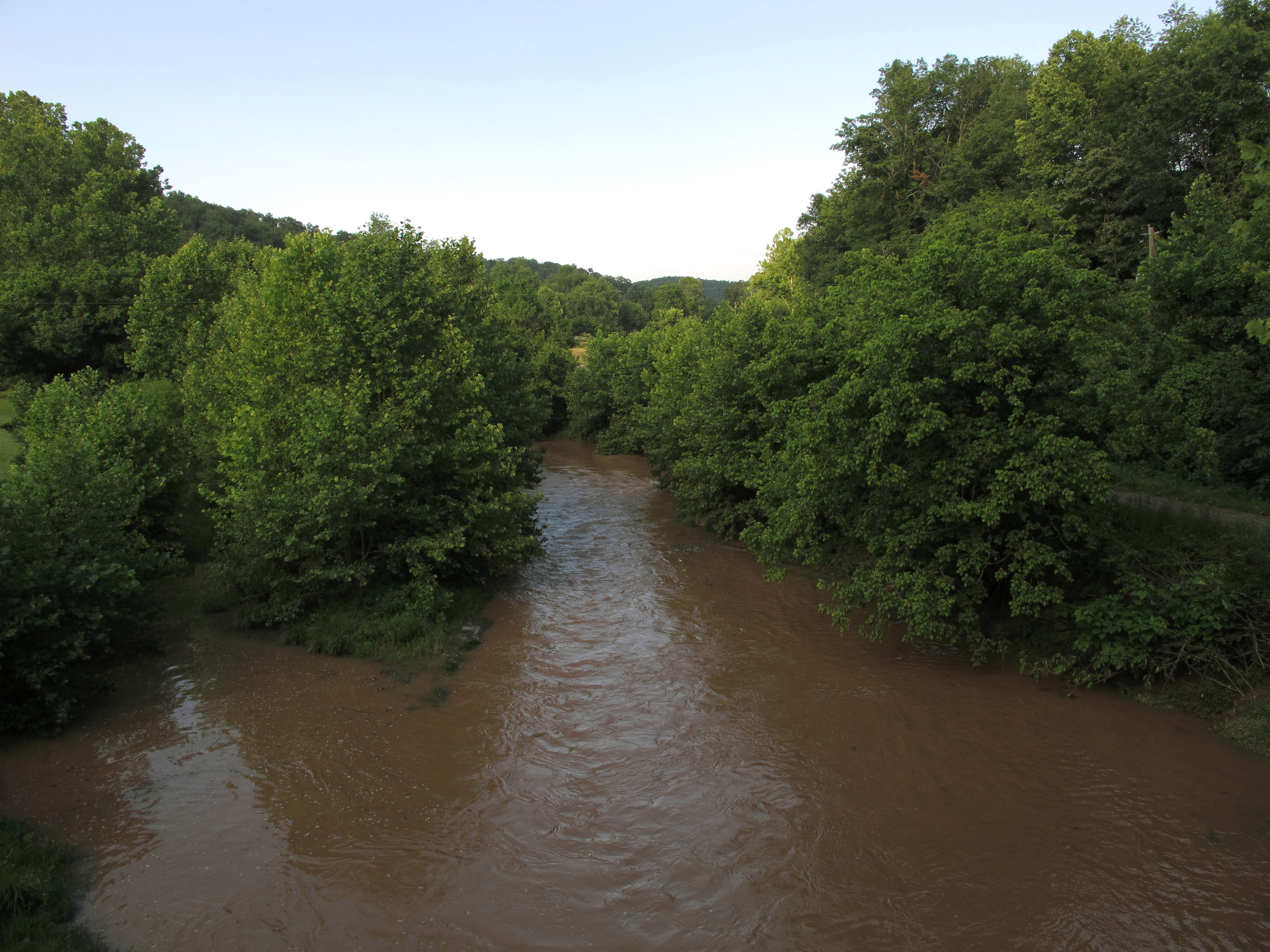
- McElroy Creek in Shirley

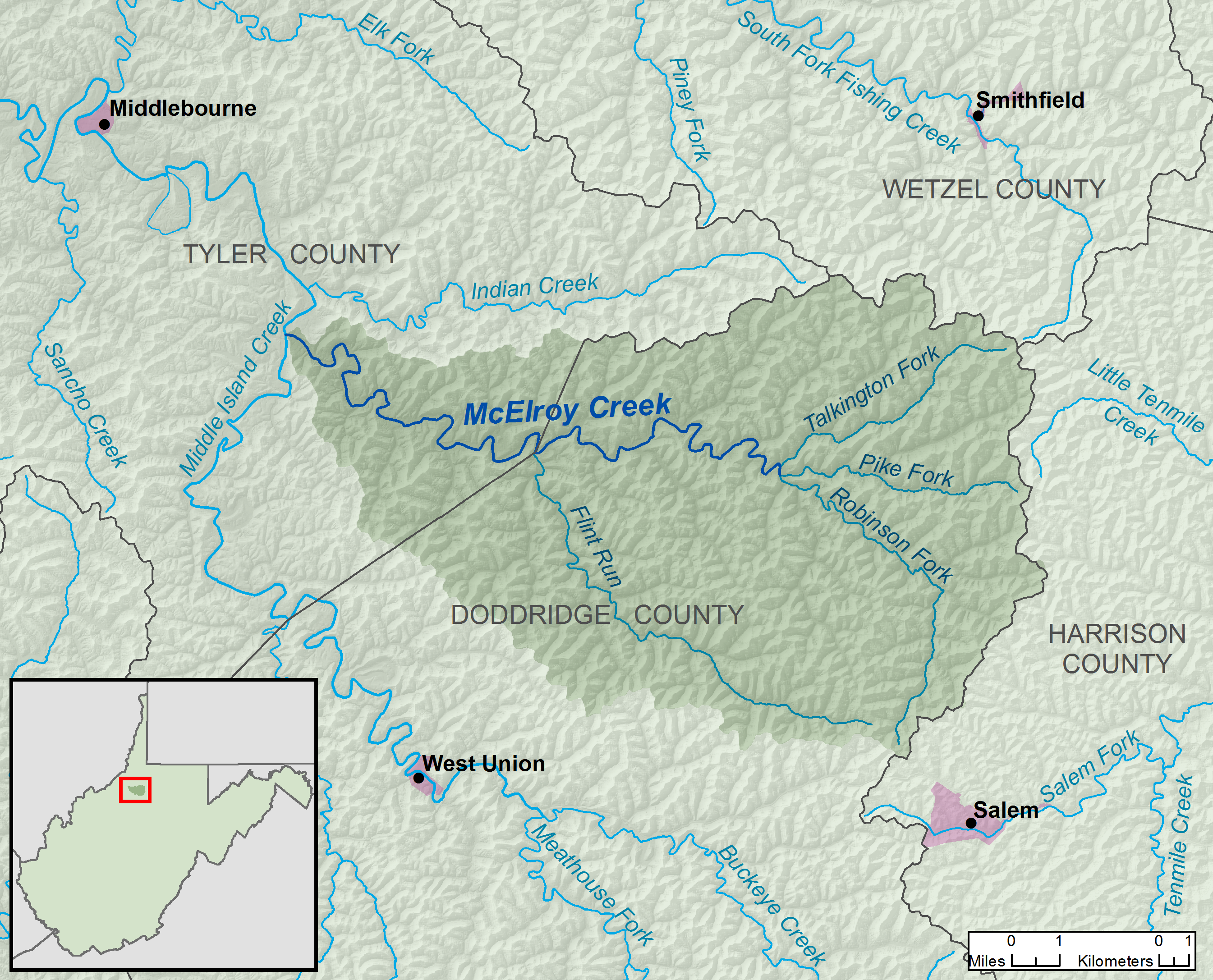
- A map of McElroy Creek and its watershed

Location
- Country: United States
- State: West Virginia
- Counties: Doddridge, Tyler

Physical characteristics
- Source: Robinson Fork
  - location: Doddridge County, northwest of Salem
  - coordinates: 39.3064755°N 80.5878753°W
  - length: 10 miles (16 km)
  - elevation: 1,153 ft (351 m)
- 2nd source: Pike Fork
  - location: Doddridge County, northeast of Sedalia
  - coordinates: 39.3848083°N 80.5431503°W
  - length: 5.8 miles (9.3 km)
  - elevation: 1,089 ft (332 m)
- Source confluence
  - location: Center Point, Doddridge County
  - coordinates: 39.389251°N 80.6370432°W
  - elevation: 781 ft (238 m)
- Mouth: Middle Island Creek
  - location: southwest of Tyler, Tyler County
  - coordinates: 39.4300801°N 80.8317721°W
  - elevation: 686 ft (209 m)
- Length: 22.1 mi (35.6 km)
- Basin size: 106.2 sq mi (275 km^{2})

Basin features
- Tributaries
  - left: Flint Run
  - right: Talkington Fork
- Hydrologic Unit Code: 0503020103 (USGS)

McElroy Creek is a tributary of Middle Island Creek, 22.1 miles (35.6 km) long, in northern West Virginia in the United States. Via Middle Island Creek and the Ohio River, it is part of the watershed of the Mississippi River, draining an area of 106.2 square miles (275 km^{2}) in a rural region on the unglaciated portion of the Allegheny Plateau.

== Geography ==
McElroy Creek is formed near the unincorporated community of Center Point in northern Doddridge County by the confluence of two streams:

- the Robinson Fork, 10 miles (16 km) long, which rises in Doddridge County approximately 2.3 miles (3.7 km) northwest of the city of Salem and flows northward and northwestward, through Sedalia
- the Pike Fork, 5.8 miles (9.3 km) long, which rises in Doddridge County approximately 2.6 miles (4.2 km) northeast of Sedalia and flows westward.

A short distance downstream of this confluence, it collects a third significant headwaters tributary, the Talkington Fork.

From Center Point, McElroy Creek flows generally westward into eastern Tyler County, through the unincorporated community of Ashley in Doddridge County and the unincorporated communities of Little Pittsburg and Shirley in Tyler County, collecting Flint Run, its largest tributary, on the boundary of Doddridge and Tyler Counties. It flows into Middle Island Creek from the east, a short distance southwest of the community of Tyler. The creek is paralleled by West Virginia Route 23 for most of its course.

According to the Geographic Names Information System, the creek has also been known historically by the spelling "McElroys Creek."

== History ==
The earliest white settler on McElroy Creek — and its namesake — was John McElroy who was killed by Indians near where it discharges into Middle Island Creek. This was likely in the early 1790s, as the natives had effectively been expelled by 1795. The "Three Forks of McElroy Creek" (near present Center Point) were first settled in 1812 by brothers Joshua Allen (1787–1867) and Israel Allen (1792–1853). This was then in District 19 of Harrison (later Doddridge) County. The district was renamed McClellan District after the American Civil War.

== See also ==
- List of rivers of West Virginia
- Center Point Covered Bridge
