= West Virginia Route 74 =

State highway in West Virginia, United States

West Virginia Route 74

Route information
- Maintained by WVDOH
- Length: 36.2 mi (58.3 km)

Major junctions
- South end: WV 47 in Coxs Mills
- US 50 near Pennsboro
- North end: WV 18 at Josephs Mills

Location
- Country: United States
- State: West Virginia
- Counties: Gilmer, Ritchie, Tyler

Highway system
- West Virginia State Highway System; Interstate; US; State
← WV 73	→ WV 75

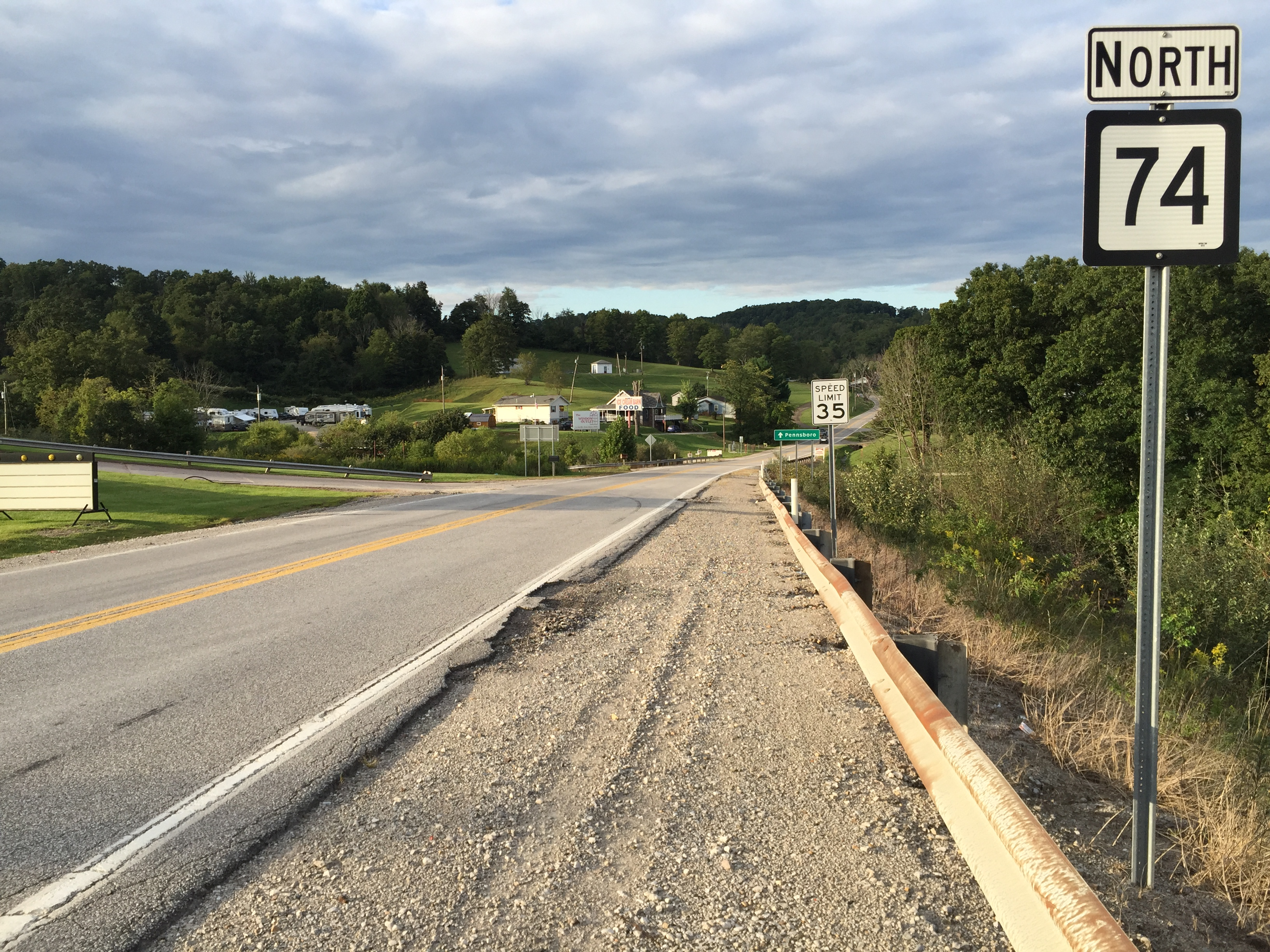
View north along WV 74 at US 50 in Pennsboro

West Virginia Route 74 is a north–south state highway in northwest West Virginia, United States. The southern terminus of the route is at West Virginia Route 47 in Coxs Mills. The northern terminus is at West Virginia Route 18 at Josephs Mills.

== Major intersections ==
County	Location	mi	km	Destinations	Notes
Gilmer	Coxs Mills			WV 47	
Ritchie	Pennsboro			US 50 – Parkersburg, Clarksburg	
Tyler	Josephs Mills			WV 18 – Middlebourne, Sistersville, West Union	
1.000 mi = 1.609 km; 1.000 km = 0.621 mi
