= Middle Island Creek =

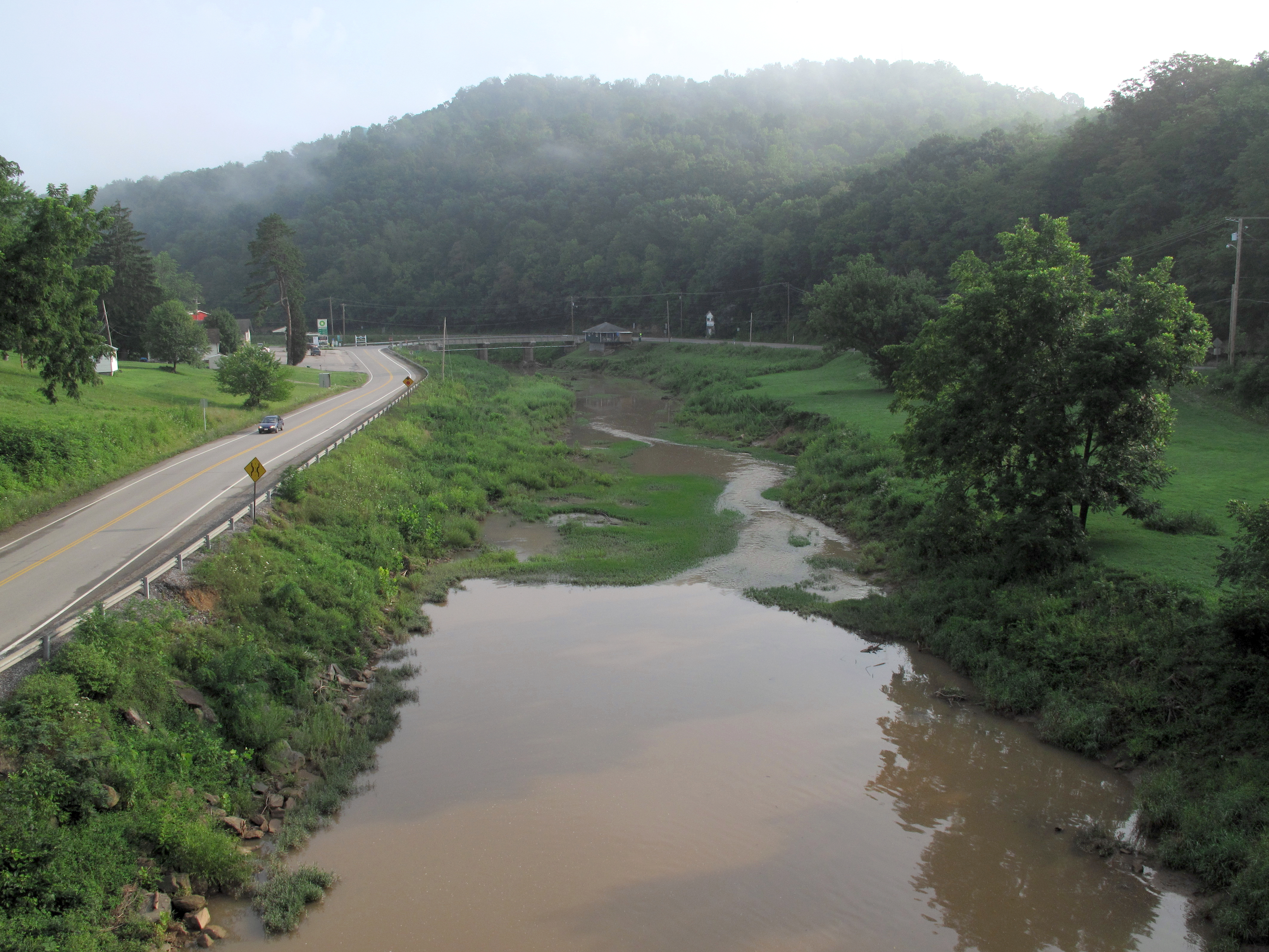
- View downstream from the North Bend Rail Trail in West Union

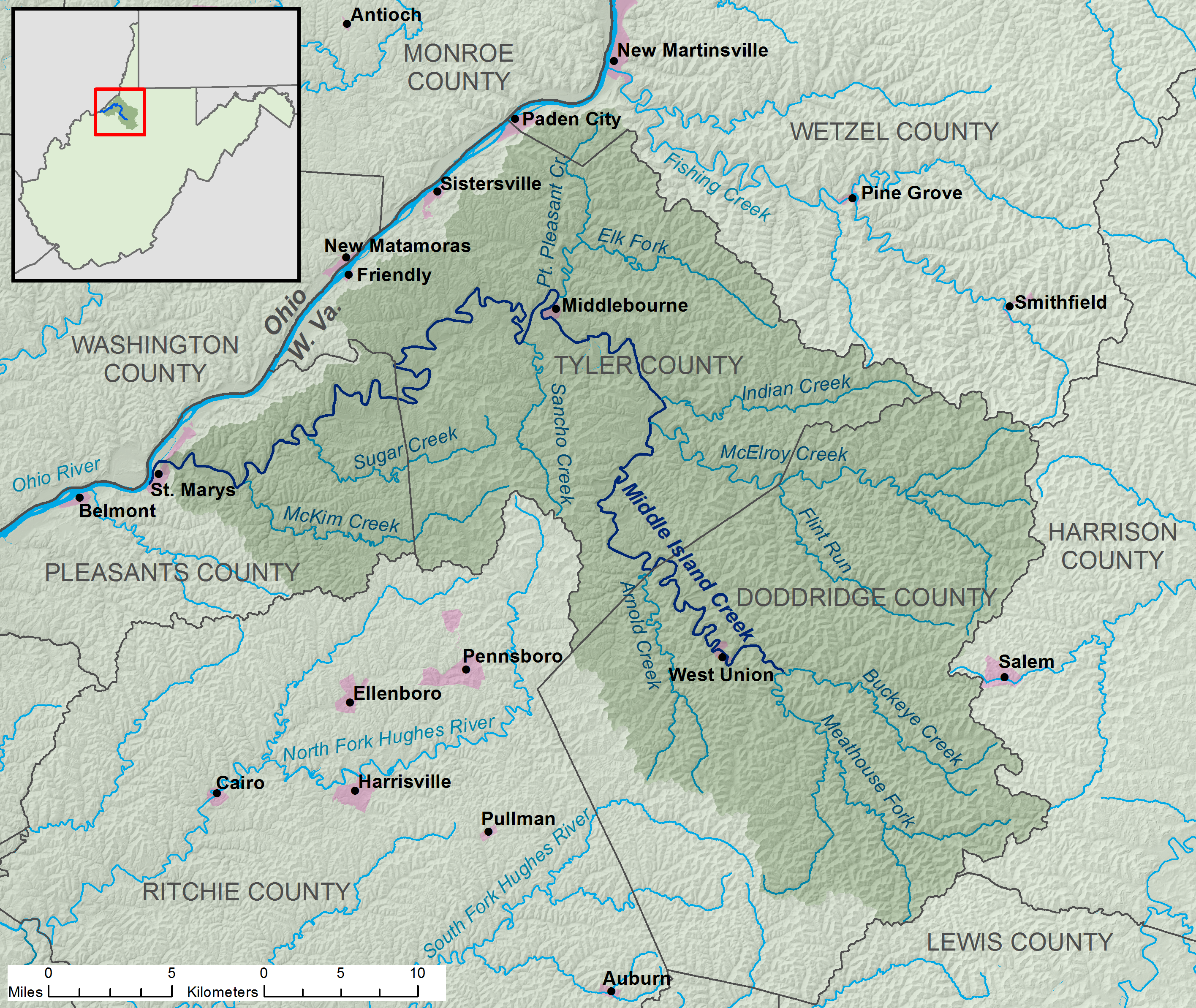
- A map of Middle Island Creek and its watershed

Location
- Country: United States
- State: West Virginia

Physical characteristics
- Source: Confluence of Meathouse Fork and Buckeye Creek
  - location: Smithburg, Doddridge County
  - coordinates: 39°17′04″N 80°43′41″W
  - elevation: 794 ft (242 m)
- Mouth: Ohio River
  - location: St. Marys
  - coordinates: 39°24′09″N 81°12′08″W
  - elevation: 607 ft (185 m)
- Length: 77 mi (124 km)
- Basin size: 565 sq mi (1,460 km^{2})
- Discharge
  - location: mouth
  - average: 844.37 cu ft/s (23.910 m^{3}/s) (estimate)

Basin features
- Tributaries
  - left: Meathouse Fork, Nutter Fork, Arnold Creek, Sancho Creek, Gorrell Run, Sugar Creek, McKim Creek
  - right: Buckeye Creek, McElroy Creek, Indian Creek, Point Pleasant Creek

Middle Island Creek is a river, 77 miles (124 km) long, in northwestern West Virginia in the United States. It is a tributary of the Ohio River, draining an area of 565 square miles (1,463 km^{2}) on the unglaciated Allegheny Plateau. It was named by late 18th century pioneering travelers on the Ohio River, who noted the location of the Creek's mouth opposite Middle Island in the larger river.

In an artifact of nomenclature, it is often pointed out that Middle Island Creek is the longest stream in West Virginia bearing the name of "creek".

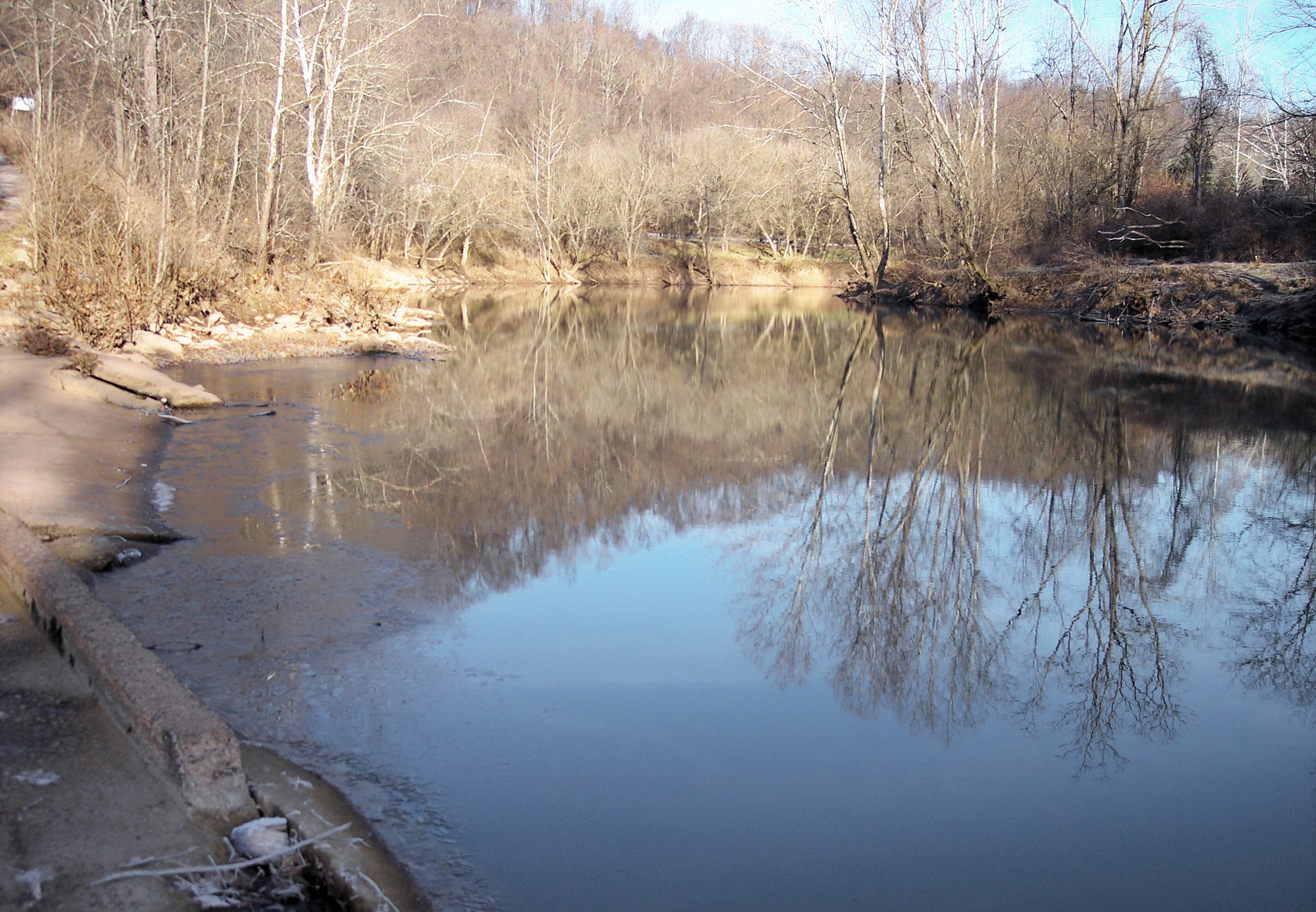
Middle Island Creek as it approaches the Jug in Tyler County

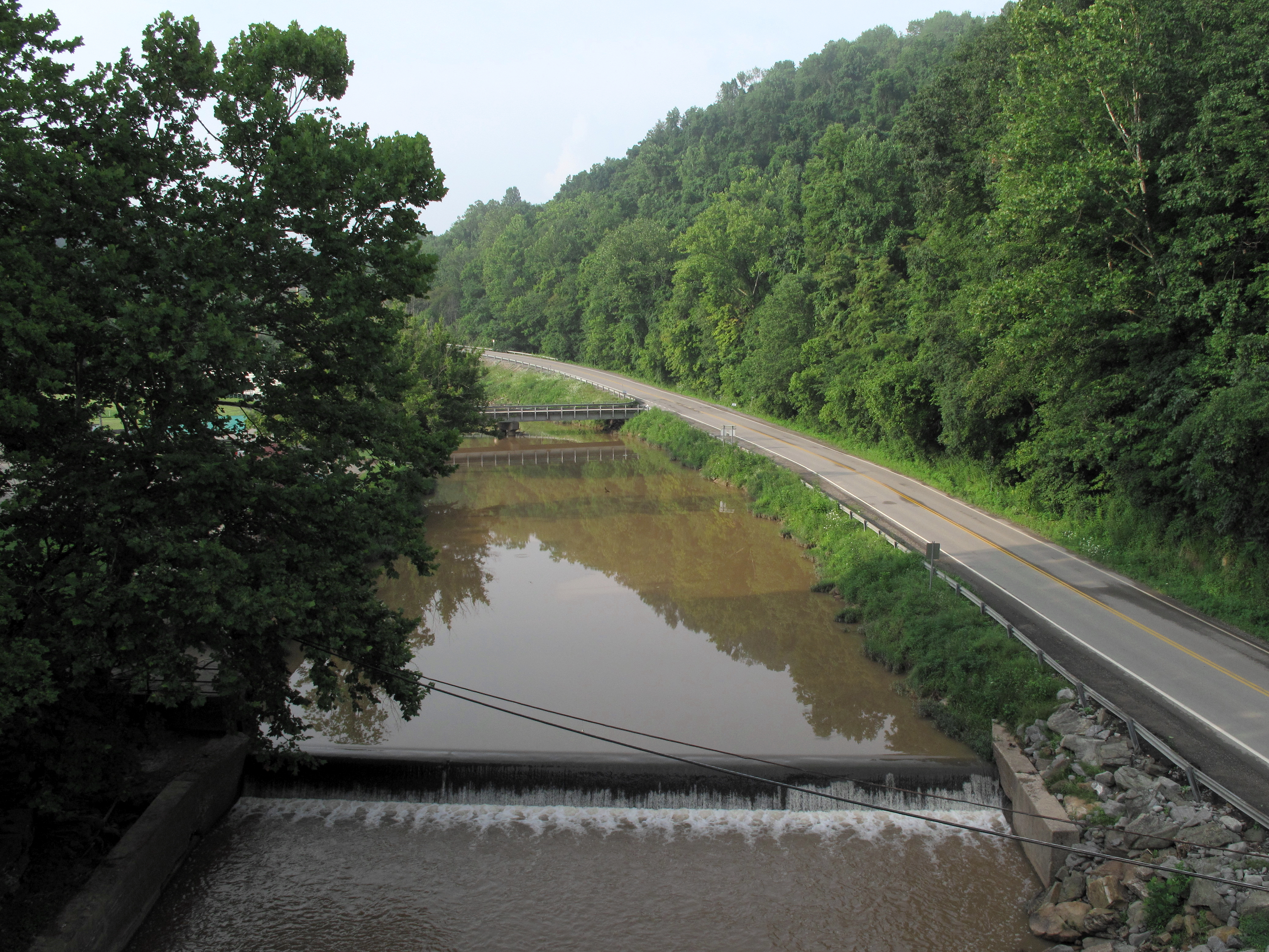
Middle Island Creek as viewed upstream from the North Bend Rail Trail in West Union

== Geography ==
=== Course ===
Middle Island Creek is formed at the community of Smithburg in Doddridge County by the confluence of Meathouse Fork and Buckeye Creek. It initially flows generally northwestward in a winding course through Doddridge and Tyler Counties, through the unincorporated community of Avondale and the town of West Union in Doddridge County; and in Tyler County, the unincorporated communities of Josephs Mills, Tyler, Blue, Frew, and Bridgeway, and the town of Middlebourne. From Middlebourne the creek turns to the southwest and flows roughly parallel to the Ohio River (excepting its numerous bends), through the unincorporated communities of Next, Little, Shiloh, and Falls Mills in Tyler County; and into Pleasants County, where it flows through the unincorporated communities of Arvilla, Sugar Valley, Union Mills, and DeLong and joins the Ohio River in the city of St. Marys. The lowermost 12 square miles (31 km^{2}) of the creek are inundated by backup from the Willow Island Locks and Dam downstream on the Ohio River.

In addition to the Meathouse Fork and Buckeye Creek, the largest tributaries of Middle Island Creek (ordered upstream to downstream) are Arnold Creek, which it collects on the boundary of Doddridge and Tyler counties; McElroy Creek, Indian Creek, Point Pleasant Creek, and Sancho Creek, each of which it collects in Tyler County; and Sugar Creek and McKim Creek, both of which it collects in Pleasants County.

=== The Jug ===
Middle Island Creek's most extreme meander forms a peninsula known as "the Jug," located upstream of Middlebourne. The creek rounds a 7-mile (11 km) bend only to return to within 100 feet (30 m) of itself. Sometime prior to 1800, a settler named George Gregg had a mill race carved across the narrow point of the peninsula and harnessed the resulting hydropower for a gristmill and sawmill. These were destroyed by a flood in 1852, while later mills were subsequently built and also washed away by floods. In 1947 the West Virginia Conservation Commission constructed a low water bridge which substantially dammed the cut-through and restored a steady flow to the bend of the creek. The land encircled by the creek's loop is operated as a Wildlife Management Area by the state of West Virginia.

== Variant names ==
According to sources gathered by the Geographic Names Information System, Middle Island Creek has also been known historically as:

- Be-Van-Soss Creek of the Indians
- Be-van-Soss Creek of the Indians
- Be-van-soss
- Be-yan-soss
- Bulls Creek
- By-En-Soss Creek
- By-en-Soss Creek
- By-en-soss
- Louisa River

== Economy ==
The creek's environs were the site of substantial oil and gas extraction activities in the late 19th century and 20th century. An oil boom began in the region in the 1860s. It peaked in Middlebourne in the 1890s, and an oil refinery operated in St. Marys between 1914 and 1987. Glass- and carbon-manufacturing facilities were built in West Union and Smithburg in the early 20th century, owing to the availability of natural gas.

== Fish life ==
Throughout its course Middle Island Creek is a slow-moving, low-gradient stream. It is considered one of the best streams in the state for muskellunge fishing; for many years in the 20th Century the West Virginia Division of Natural Resources harvested muskie eggs from the creek for use in its fish-stocking programs in streams elsewhere in the state. Other fish commonly found in the creek include spotted bass, smallmouth bass, rock bass, various species of sunfish, freshwater drum, channel catfish, and flathead catfish.

== See also ==
- List of West Virginia rivers
- West Union Covered Bridge (West Virginia)
