= Raymond LeRoy Archer =

American bishop

Raymond LeRoy Archer (October 31, 1887 – July 3, 1970) was an American bishop of The Methodist Church. He was elected in 1950.

== Birth and family ==
Raymond was born 31 October 1887 in Adonis, Tyler County, West Virginia, the son of William Jackson and Sarah V. (Twyford) Archer. Raymond married Edna Priscilla Caye of Wilmerding, Pennsylvania 27 April 1916.

== Education ==
Raymond was a student at Washington and Jefferson College, 1907-08. He earned the A.B. degree from the University of Pittsburgh in 1911. He earned the A.M. degree from Drew Theological Seminary in 1923. He studied at Union Theological Seminary in New York City, 1923–24, and at the University of Frankfurt, Frankfurt, Germany in 1929. He earned the Ph.D. degree from Hartford Theological Seminary in 1935.

== Ordained ministry ==
The Rev. Archer was received on-trial by the Pittsburgh Annual Conference of the Methodist Episcopal Church in 1909. He was received into full connection and ordained elder, October 1911. The Rev. Archer was appointed pastor of the Huston-Meadowlands Circuit, 1907–08, and of the West Holmstead Methodist Church, 1908-11.

== Missionary service ==
The Rev. Archer entered missionary service in 1911, transferring his conference membership to the Malaya Annual Conference, appointed to Buitenzorg, Java, 1911-23. In 1924 he transferred to the Sumatra Mission Conference, serving as superintendent of the Sumatra Mission, 1924-29.

In 1930 Rev. Archer returned to the U.S. and was appointed pastor of the Hockenam Methodist Church in East Hartford, Connecticut, in the Southern New England Annual Conference. But in 1933 he transferred back to the Malaya Conference, appointed as pastor of the Wesley Methodist Church in Singapore, 1933-34. He then also became the superintendent of the Singapore District, as well as the superintendent and treasurer of the Mission, 1933-42.

In 1943 the Rev. Dr. Archer became the assistant treasurer of the Division of Foreign Missions for The Methodist Church. Then he was appointed associate secretary for Foreign Missions, 1946-50.

== Episcopal ministry ==
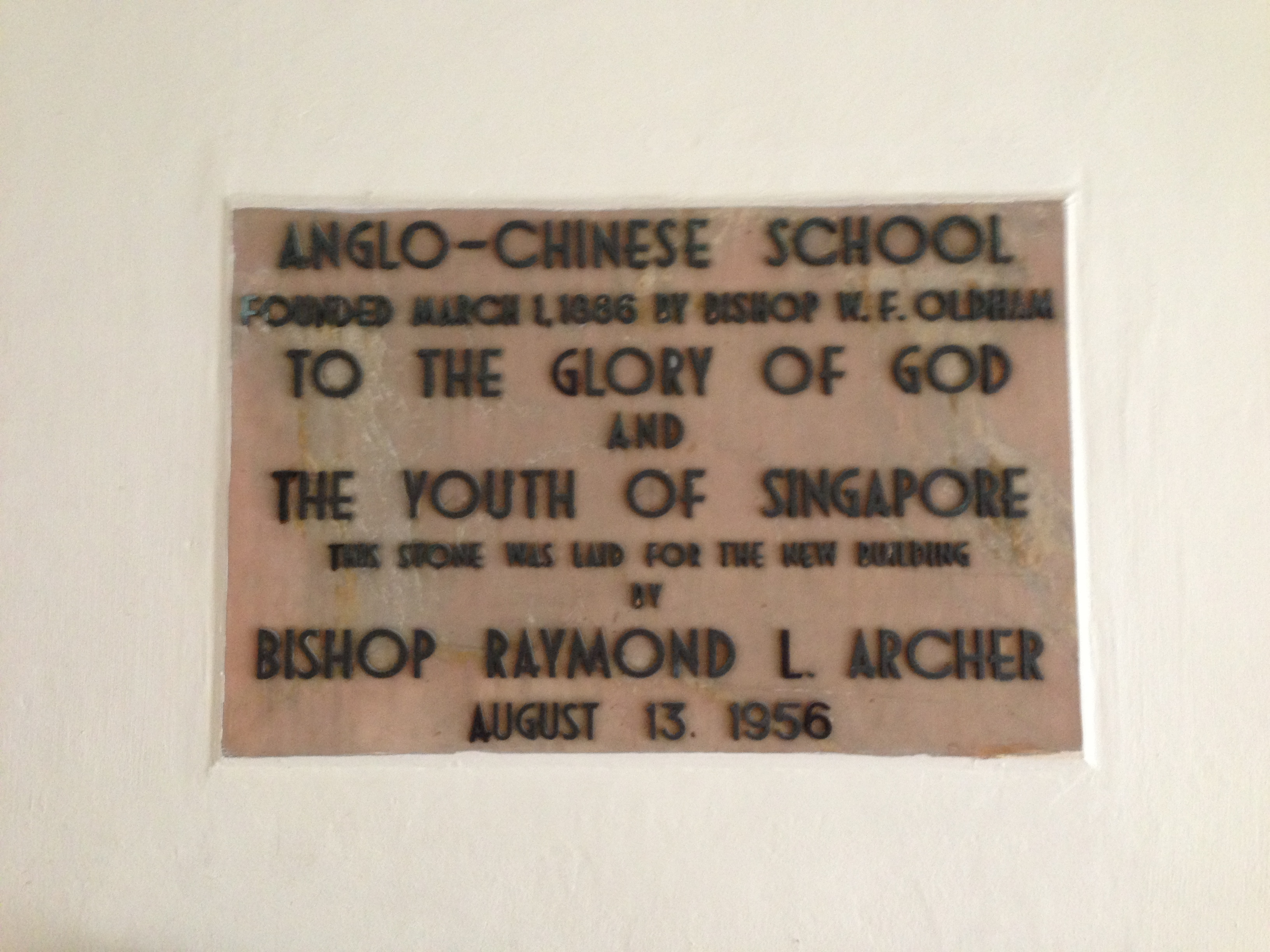
A plaque laid by Rev. Archer in 1956 to commemorate the construction of a new building at the Anglo-Chinese Primary School on Canning Rise. The building is now occupied by the National Archives of Singapore.

The Rev. Dr. Raymond LeRoy Archer was elected to the episcopacy of The Methodist Church by the Southeastern Asia Central Conference in 1950. He was assigned the Singapore episcopal area.

The Rev. Dr. Archer had been a member of Central Conferences since 1936. He also was a delegate to the 1936 and 1944 General Conferences of The Methodist Church, as well as the Uniting Conference of 1939.

Bishop Archer died 3 July 1970 in Pittsburgh, Pennsylvania.

== Selected writings ==
- Mohammedan Mysticism in Sumatra 1935.

== See also ==
- List of bishops of the United Methodist Church
