= Pursley =

Pursley may refer to:

- Pursley, West Virginia
- Greg Pursley
- Leo Aloysius Pursley
- Robert E. Pursley
- Tricia Pursley
- Purslane
