= Shirley, West Virginia =

- Unincorporated community
- Location within West Virginia Location within the United States
- Coordinates: 39°23′53″N 80°45′54″W
- Country: United States
- State: West Virginia
- County: Tyler
- Elevation: 722 ft (220 m)
- Time zone: UTC-5 (Eastern (EST))
  - Summer (DST): UTC-4 (EDT)
- ZIP code: 26434
- Area codes: 304 & 681
- GNIS feature ID: 1546696

Shirley is an unincorporated community in Tyler County, West Virginia, United States. Shirley is located along West Virginia Route 23 and McElroy Creek, 10 miles (16 km) southeast of Middlebourne. Shirley has a post office with ZIP code 26434.
