= Flint Run (West Virginia) =

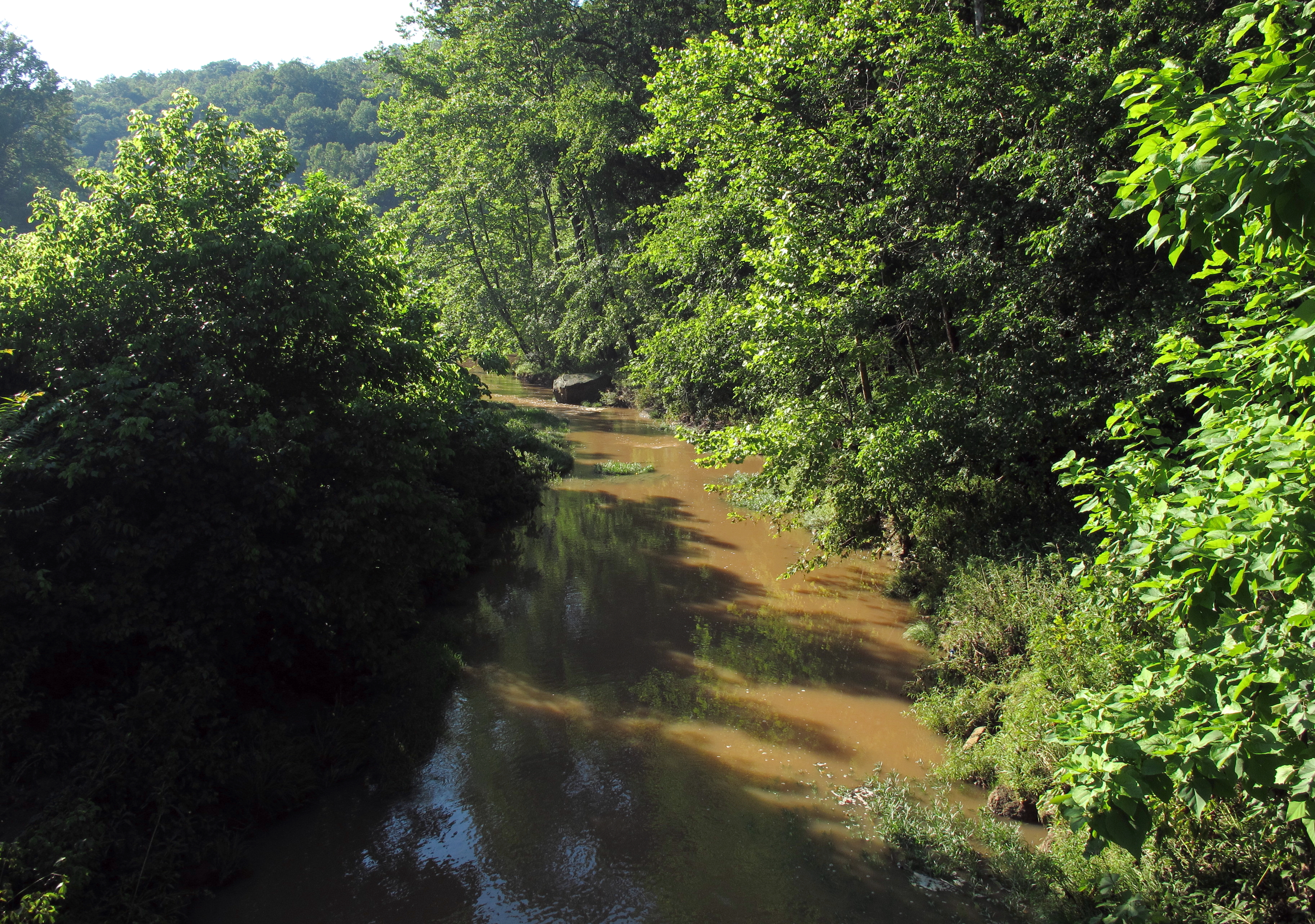
- Flint Run near its confluence with McElroy Creek

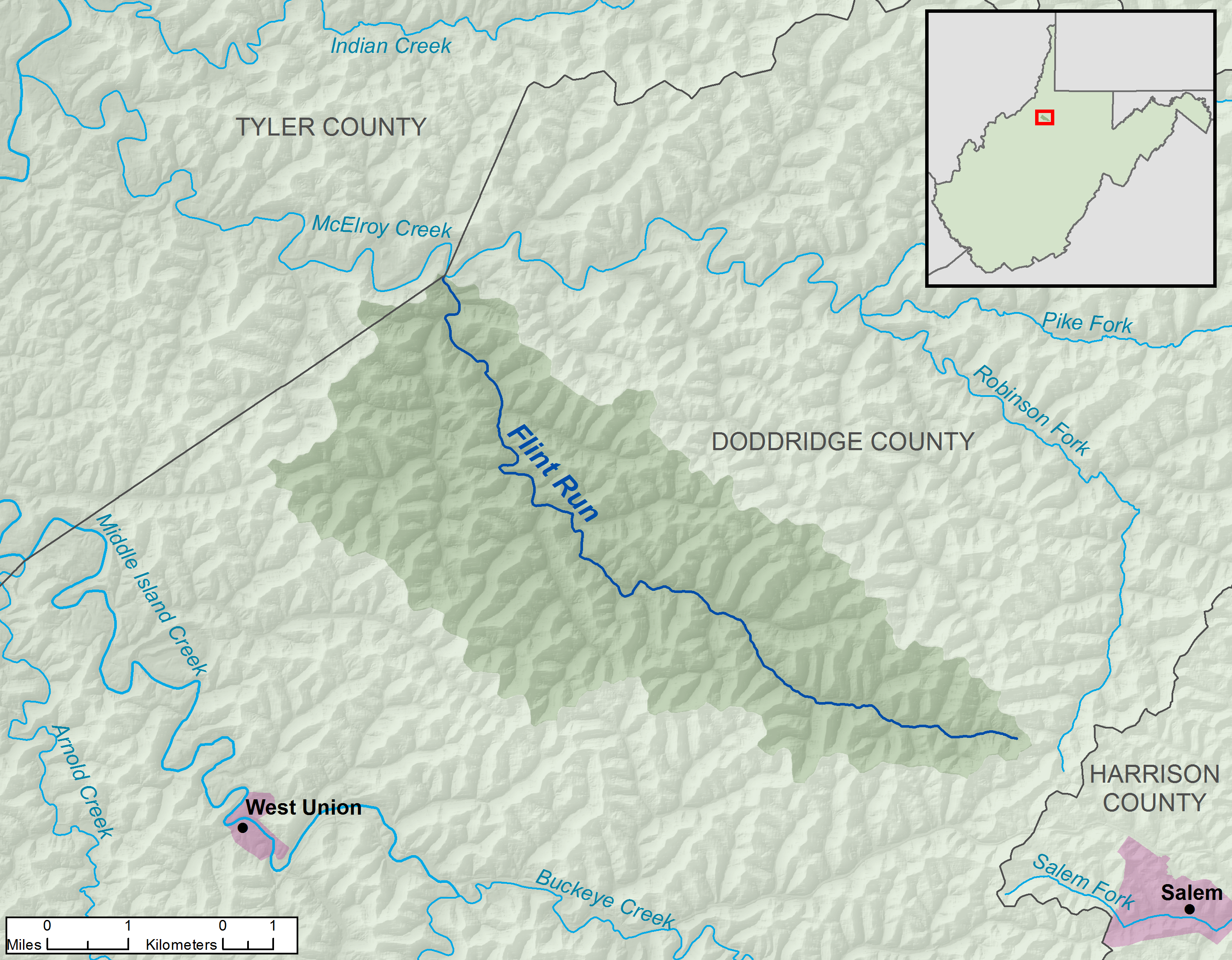
- A map of Flint Run and its watershed

Location
- Country: United States
- State: West Virginia
- Counties: Doddridge, Tyler

Physical characteristics
- Source
  - location: east of Doak
  - coordinates: 39.3134196°N 80.598709°W
  - elevation: 1,165 ft (355 m)
- Mouth: McElroy Creek
  - location: east of Little Pittsburg
  - coordinates: 39.3953603°N 80.7331584°W
  - elevation: 735 ft (224 m)
- Length: 7.5 mi (12.1 km)
- Basin size: 25.6 sq mi (66 km^{2})

Basin features
- Hydrologic Unit Code: 050302010302 (USGS)

Flint Run is a tributary of McElroy Creek, 7.5 miles (12.1 km) long, in northern West Virginia in the United States. Via McElroy Creek, Middle Island Creek, and the Ohio River, it is part of the watershed of the Mississippi River, draining an area of 25.6 square miles (66 km^{2}) in a rural region on the unglaciated portion of the Allegheny Plateau.

Flint Run rises in Doddridge County near its boundary with Harrison County, approximately 1.9 miles (3.1 km) east of the unincorporated community of Doak, and flows generally northwestward through northern Doddridge County, through Doak and the unincorporated community of Flint. It flows into McElroy Creek from the south on the boundary of Doddridge and Tyler counties, approximately 0.5 miles (0.80 km) east of Little Pittsburg.

According to the Geographic Names Information System, the stream has also been known historically by the name "Big Flint Run." It collects a tributary named Little Flint Run a short distance upstream of its mouth.

== See also ==
- List of rivers of West Virginia
