= West Virginia Route 18 =

State highway in West Virginia, United States

West Virginia Route 18

Route information
- Maintained by WVDOH
- Length: 57.4 mi (92.4 km)

Major junctions
- South end: WV 47 in Troy
- US 50 near West Union; WV 180 in Kidwell; WV 2 in Sistersville
- North end: Sistersville Ferry in Sistersville

Location
- Country: United States
- State: West Virginia
- Counties: Gilmer, Doddridge, Tyler

Highway system
- West Virginia State Highway System; Interstate; US; State
← WV 17	→ US 19

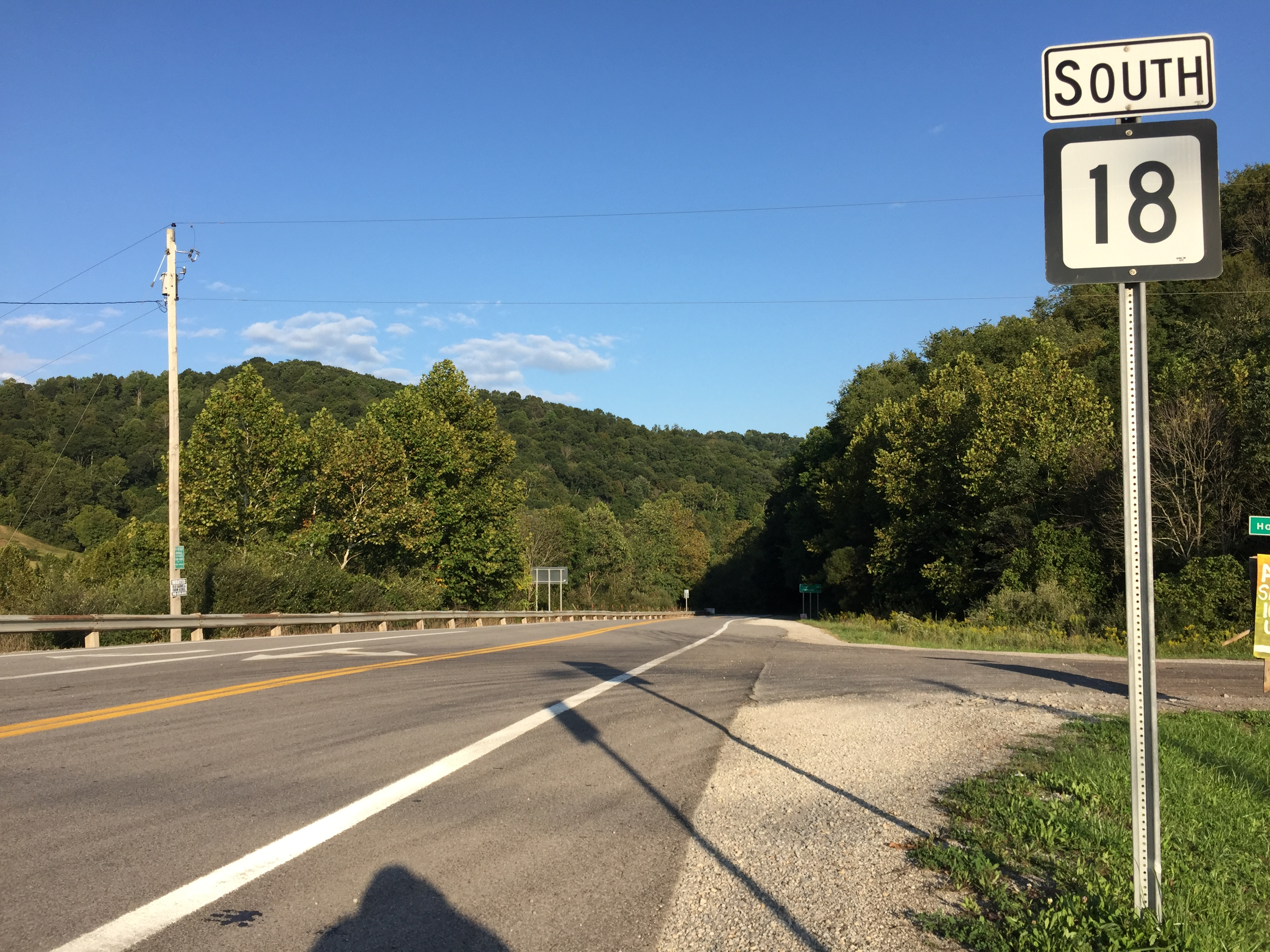
View south along WV 18 at CR 18/1 just south of West Union

West Virginia Route 18 is a north–south state highway in the northwestern portion of the U.S. state of West Virginia. The southern terminus of the route is at West Virginia Route 47 in Troy, Gilmer County. The northern terminus is at the Sistersville Ferry on Catherine St in Sistersville, Tyler County. WV 18 uses Charles St, Main St and Catherine St through Sistersville to reach the ferry. As of September 2015, WVDOH signage does not show WV 18 on WV 2.

== Major intersections ==
County	Location	mi	km	Destinations	Notes
Gilmer	Troy			WV 47 – Glenville	
Doddridge	West Union			US 50 – Parkersburg, Clarksburg	
Tyler	Josephs Mills			WV 74 south – Pennsboro	
Tyler	Tyler			WV 23 south	
Tyler	Kidwell			WV 180 north – New Martinsville	
Tyler	Sistersville			WV 2 – Paden City	
Tyler	Ohio River			Sistersville Ferry	To SR 7
1.000 mi = 1.609 km; 1.000 km = 0.621 mi
