= Flint Run =

Flint Run may refer to:

- Flint Run Archeological District, also known as the Flint Run Complex, in Virginia
- Flint Run (West Virginia), a stream
