= Sanco (disambiguation) =

Sanco can mean:

- Mie Kotsu Co., Ltd., also known as Sanco, a Japanese public transportation company
- DG-SANCO, a European Union organisation, now Directorate-General for Health and Food Safety
- South African National Civics Organisation (SANCO)
- Sanco, Texas, Coke County, Texas, U.S.
- Sancho Creek, formerly Sanco Creek, West Virginia, U.S.
