= Ashley, West Virginia =

Unincorporated community in West Virginia, United States

- Unincorporated community
- Location within West Virginia Location within the United States
- Coordinates: 39°24′16″N 80°40′33″W
- Country: United States
- State: West Virginia
- County: Doddridge
- Elevation: 804 ft (245 m)
- Time zone: UTC-5 (Eastern (EST))
  - Summer (DST): UTC-4 (EDT)
- Area codes: 304 & 681
- GNIS feature ID: 1553759

Ashley is an unincorporated community in Doddridge County, West Virginia, United States. Ashley is located along West Virginia Route 23 and McElroy Creek, 9 miles (14 km) northeast of West Union.

The community was named in honor of the local Ash family.
