= Long Reach =

Long Reach or Longreach may refer to:

== Places ==
- Long Reach, Columbia, Maryland, United States
- Long Reach, Kent, UK
- Long Reach, at Gravesend, Kent, UK
- Long Reach, West Virginia, United States
- Longreach, Queensland, Australia
- Longreach Region, Queensland
- Long Reach, Tasmania, Australia, near Bell Bay

== Other uses ==
- Operation Long Reach, part of the 1965 Pleiku Campaign in the Vietnam War
