= Bens Run, West Virginia =

Unincorporated community in West Virginia, United States

- Unincorporated community
- Location within West Virginia Location within the United States
- Coordinates: 39°27′57″N 81°06′30″W
- Country: United States
- State: West Virginia
- County: Tyler
- Elevation: 620 ft (190 m)
- Time zone: UTC-5 (Eastern (EST))
  - Summer (DST): UTC-4 (EDT)
- ZIP code: 26135
- Area codes: 304 & 681
- GNIS feature ID: 1535644

Bens Run is an unincorporated community in Tyler County, West Virginia, United States. Bens Run is located on the Ohio River at the junction of West Virginia Route 2 and County Route 5, 4.3 miles (6.9 km) southwest of Friendly. Bens Run had a post office, which closed on November 2, 2002.

Prehistoric earthworks were once located between Bens Run and the nearby community of Long Reach. Lewis Summers first described these earthworks in 1808 as "an ancient encampment" covering an area of 10 acres (4.0 ha) and surrounded by trenches; later accounts estimated their size at near 400 acres (160 ha). The Archaeology Section of the West Virginia Geological and Economic Survey formally noted the earthworks in 1965, by which point there were no remaining signs of their existence.

== Climate ==
The climate in this area is characterized by hot, humid summers and generally mild to cool winters. According to the Köppen Climate Classification system, Bens Run has a humid subtropical climate, abbreviated "Cfa" on climate maps.
