= Sedalia =

Sedalia is the name of several places:

== Canada ==
- Sedalia, Alberta, a hamlet in Alberta, Canada

== United States ==
- Sedalia, Colorado
- Sedalia, Indiana
- Sedalia, Kentucky
- Sedalia, Missouri, the largest US city named Sedalia
- Sedalia, North Carolina
- Sedalia, Ohio, also known as Midway
- Sedalia, South Carolina
- Sedalia, Texas
- Sedalia, Virginia
- Sedalia, West Virginia

== See also ==
- Sedalia is also the name of a type of Stone Age arrowhead
- Sedilia, a type of chair
