= William Wells House =

Historic house in West Virginia, United States

- U.S. National Register of Historic Places
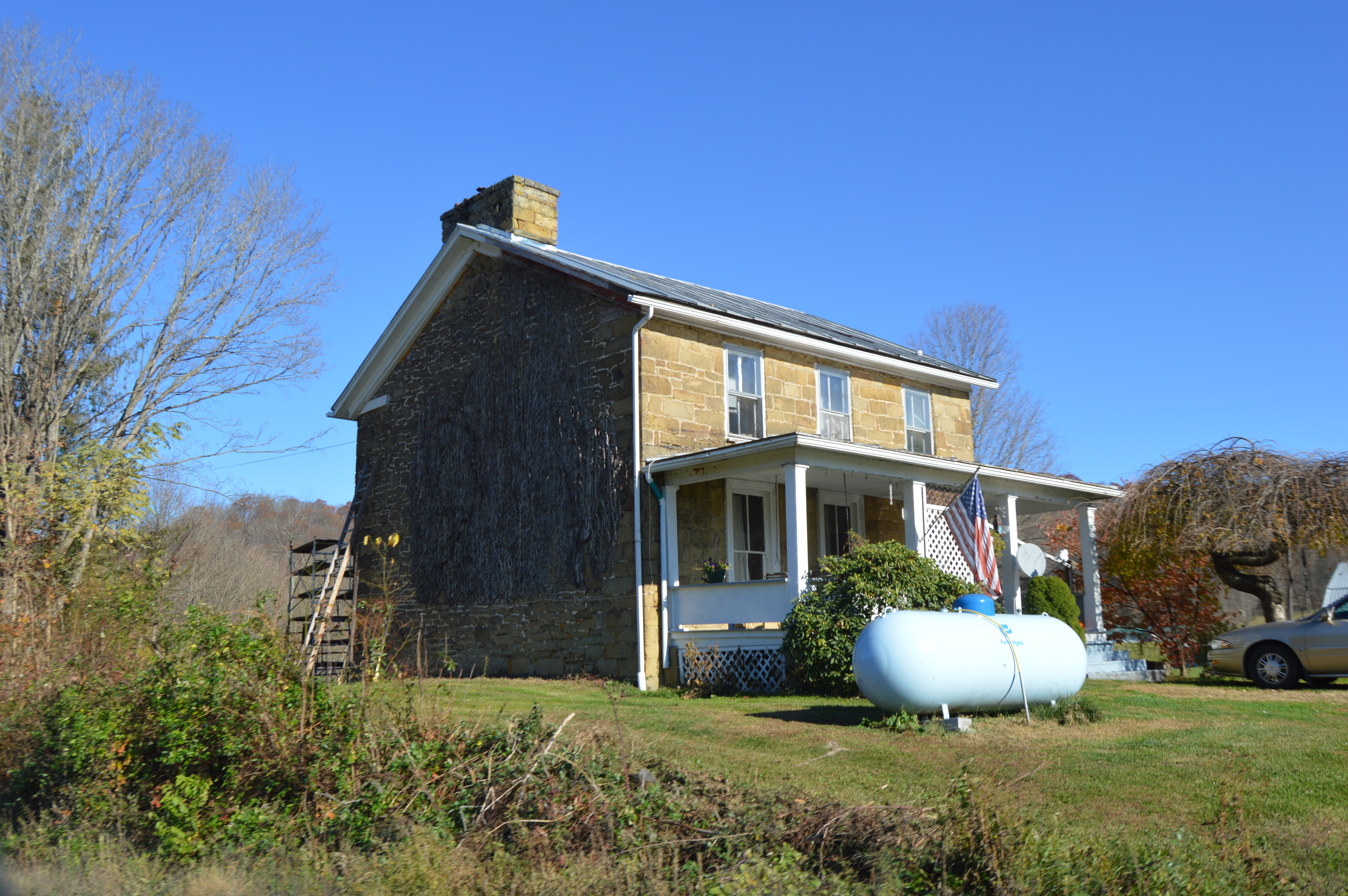
- Western side and front

- Location within West Virginia Location within the United States
- Location: WV 18, Tyler City, West Virginia
- Coordinates: 39°26′5.5″N 80°49′31″W
- Area: 3.5 acres (1.4 ha)
- Built: 1801
- Architect: William Wells
- NRHP reference No.: 87001176
- Added to NRHP: July 21, 1987

William Wells House, also known as the "Stone House" or "Stonehurst," is a historic home located at Tyler City, Tyler County, West Virginia. It was built about 1801–1804, and is a modest 2-story sandstone residence. The house is nearly square and has an unusually large interior chimney. A Victorian-style frame addition was built about 1895 at the rear of the house. It is recognized as the county's oldest house. Also located on the property is the family burial ground where Wells' grave marker stands.

It was listed on the National Register of Historic Places in 1987.
