= Sancho Creek =

River in the United States of America

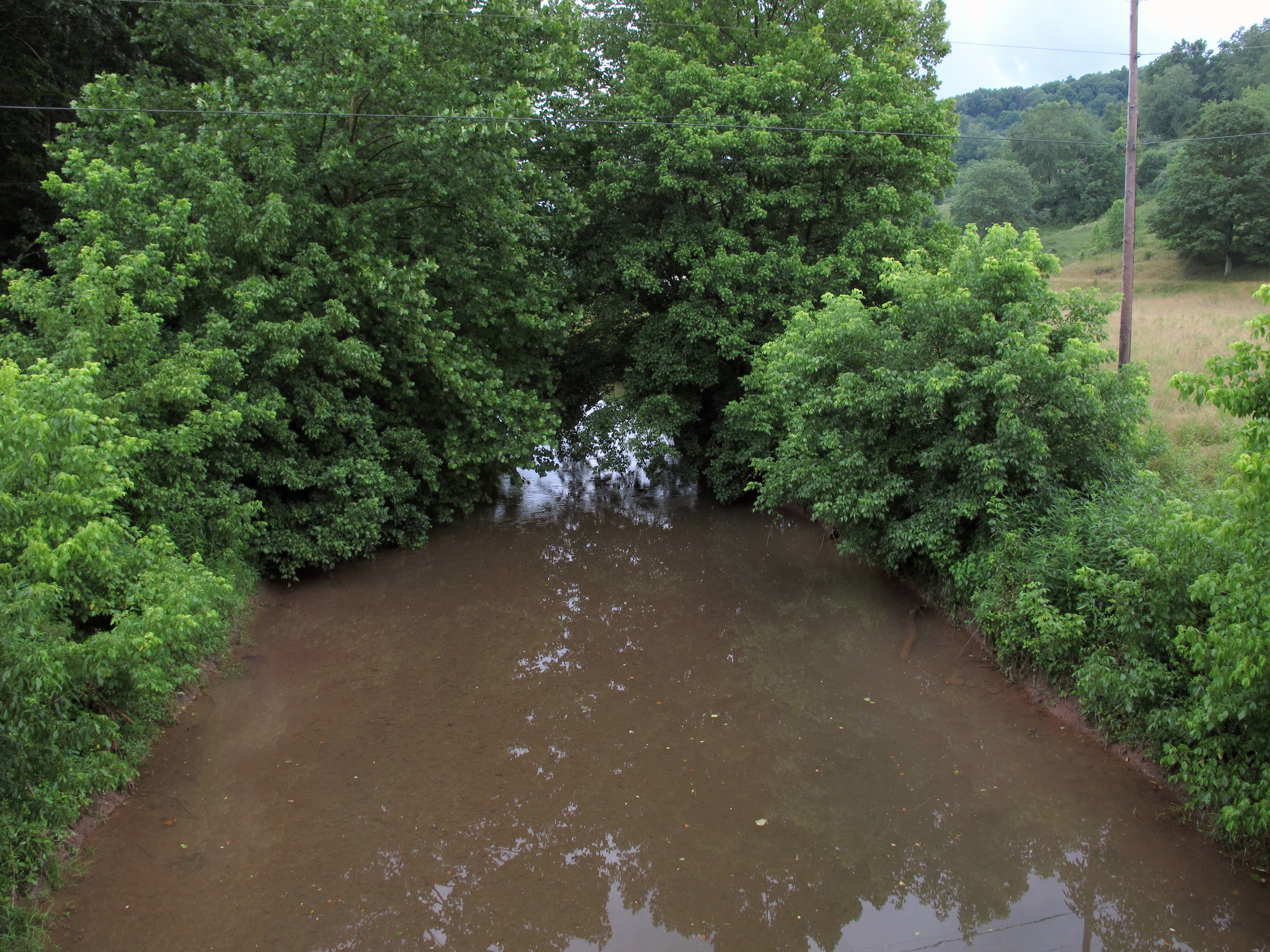
- Sancho Creek east of Locke

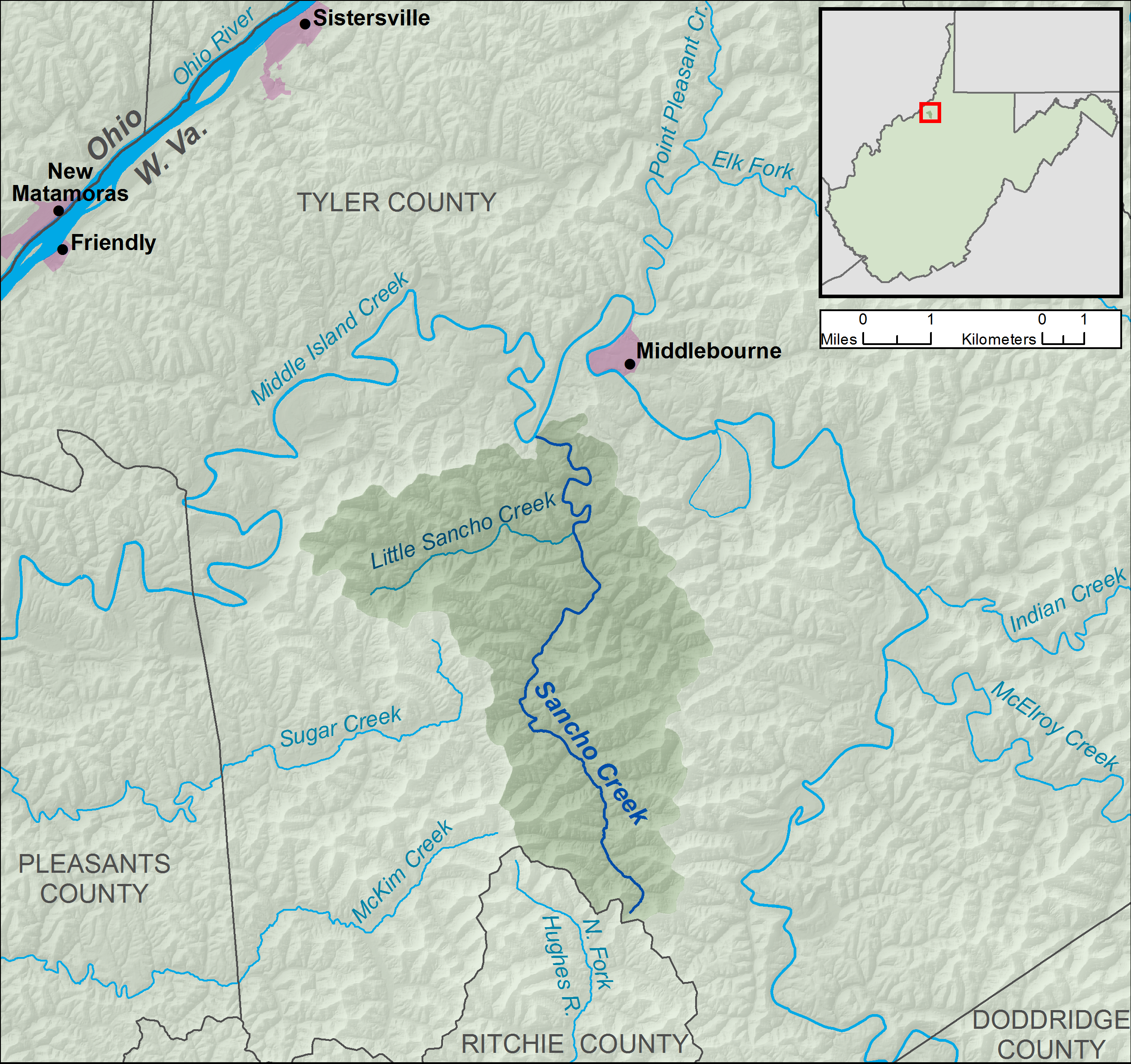
- A map of Sancho Creek and its watershed

Location
- Country: United States
- State: West Virginia
- County: Tyler

Physical characteristics
- Source
  - location: south of Bearsville
  - coordinates: 39.375°N 80.9013889°W
  - elevation: 1,033 ft (315 m)
- Mouth: Middle Island Creek
  - location: southwest of Middlebourne
  - coordinates: 39.4767442°N 80.9298299°W
  - elevation: 656 ft (200 m)
- Length: 9.6 mi (15.4 km)
- Basin size: 22.2 sq mi (57 km^{2})

Basin features
- Hydrologic Unit Code: 050302010505 (USGS)

Sancho Creek is a tributary of Middle Island Creek, 9.6 miles (15.4 km) long, in northwestern West Virginia in the United States. Via Middle Island Creek and the Ohio River, it is part of the watershed of the Mississippi River, draining an area of 22.2 square miles (57 km^{2}) in a rural region on the unglaciated portion of the Allegheny Plateau.

Sancho Creek's course and watershed are entirely in Tyler County. The creek rises in southern Tyler County near its boundary with Ritchie County, and flows generally northward through the unincorporated community of Bearsville to its confluence with Middle Island Creek, approximately 1.8 miles (2.9 km) southwest of Middlebourne.

According to the Geographic Names Information System, Sancho Creek has also been known historically by the spelling "Sanco Creek."

== See also ==
- List of rivers of West Virginia
