= Sunnyside, Tyler County, West Virginia =

Sunnyside
- Unincorporated community
- Location within the state of West Virginia Sunnyside (the United States)
- Coordinates: 39°25′24″N 80°49′6″W
- Country: United States
- State: West Virginia
- County: Tyler
- Elevation: 738 ft (225 m)
- Time zone: UTC-5 (Eastern (EST))
  - Summer (DST): UTC-4 (EDT)
- GNIS ID: 1678703

Sunnyside is an unincorporated community in Tyler County, West Virginia, United States.
