= Vincen, West Virginia =

Unincorporated community in West Virginia, US

Coordinates: 39°32′47″N 80°46′59″W

Location of Vincen within the state of West Virginia

Vincen is an unincorporated community in Tyler and Wetzel counties, in the U.S. state of West Virginia.

== History ==
A post office opened on the Wetzel County side at Vincen in 1890, where it remained in operation until it was discontinued in 1913. The community derives its name from Vincent Amos, an early settler. In Kenny Hamill's book he mistakenly listed Vincent as a Merett, because of a misplaced comma in John C. McEldowney's 1901 History of Wetzel County.
