= Conaway, West Virginia =

Unincorporated community in West Virginia, United States

- Unincorporated community
- Location of Conaway Corner in West Virginia Conaway, West Virginia (the United States)
- Coordinates: 39°30′27″N 80°46′11″W
- Country: United States
- State: West Virginia
- County: Tyler
- Elevation: 866 ft (264 m)
- Time zone: UTC-5 (Central (EST))
  - Summer (DST): UTC-4 (EDT)
- GNIS feature ID: 1549636

Conaway is an unincorporated community in Tyler County, West Virginia, United States along Elk Fork. Its post office (established December 21, 1868, and discontinued October 15, 1913) is closed.
