= Akron, West Virginia =

Unincorporated community in West Virginia, United States

Akron
- Unincorporated community
- Location within the state of West Virginia Akron (the United States)
- Coordinates: 39°24′53″N 80°48′20″W
- Country: United States
- State: West Virginia
- County: Tyler
- Time zone: UTC-5 (Eastern (EST))
  - Summer (DST): UTC-4 (EDT)
- FIPS code: 1678605

Akron is an unincorporated community in Tyler County, West Virginia, United States.
