= Iuka, West Virginia =

Iuka
- Unincorporated community
- Location within the state of West Virginia Iuka (the United States)
- Coordinates: 39°30′54″N 80°47′24″W
- Country: United States
- State: West Virginia
- County: Tyler
- Elevation: 797 ft (243 m)
- Time zone: UTC-5 (Eastern (EST))
  - Summer (DST): UTC-4 (EDT)
- GNIS ID: 1554786

Iuka is an unincorporated community in Tyler County, West Virginia, United States, along Elk Fork. Its post office is currently closed.
