= The Jug =

Island in West Virginia, United States

The Jug Wildlife Management Area
- IUCN category V (protected landscape/seascape)
- Location within West Virginia
- Location: Tyler, West Virginia, United States
- Coordinates: 39°28′05″N 80°52′31″W
- Area: 2,848 acres (11.53 km^{2})
- Elevation: 900 ft (270 m)
- Website: WVDNR District 6 Wildlife Management Areas

The Jug — formerly known as the Jug Handle — is a jug-shaped island formed by a horseshoe bend on Middle Island Creek near Middlebourne in Tyler County, West Virginia, USA. It is maintained by the state of West Virginia as The Jug Wildlife Management Area (2,848 acres, including the Jug and much land south of it).

== History ==
Middle Island Creek's most extreme meander forms a peninsula known as "the Jug", located upstream of Middlebourne. The creek rounds a 3.3 mile (5.3 km) bend only to return to within 100 feet (30 m) of itself. Sometime prior to 1800, an early white settler named George Gregg had a raceway (mill race) carved across the narrow point of the peninsula and harnessed the resulting hydropower of the stream's 13-foot (4 m) fall for a gristmill and sawmill at the site. These mills were destroyed by a flood in 1852; four more mills were subsequently built and respectively washed away by flooding in the later 19th century. Flooding had the effect of widening the raceway across the peninsula such that it became the main channel of the stream, inhibiting the flow of water through the longer loop and transforming the peninsula into an island. In 1947 the West Virginia Conservation Commission constructed a low water bridge which substantially dammed the cut-through and restored a steady flow to the bend of the creek. The low water bridge is known to be frequently impassable due to flooding. The land encircled by the creek's loop is operated as a Wildlife Management Area by the state of West Virginia.

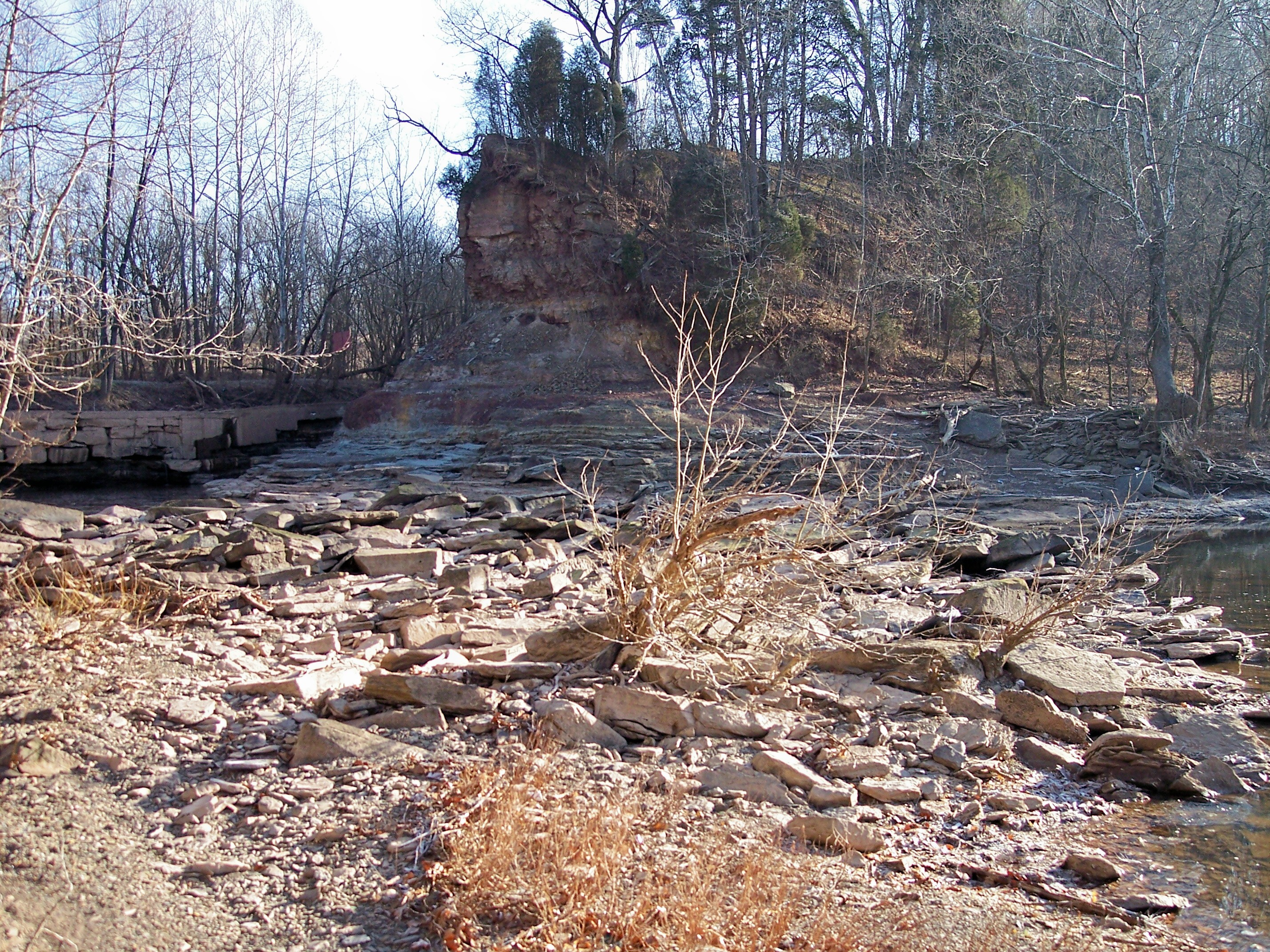
The remains of the 18th-19th century cut across the peninsula of the Jug, as viewed in 2006. The creek is partially prevented from flowing here by the dam effect of the low water bridge visible at left (see photograph below); the creek is slightly visible at right, having emerged from a 3.3 mile (5.3 km) meander.

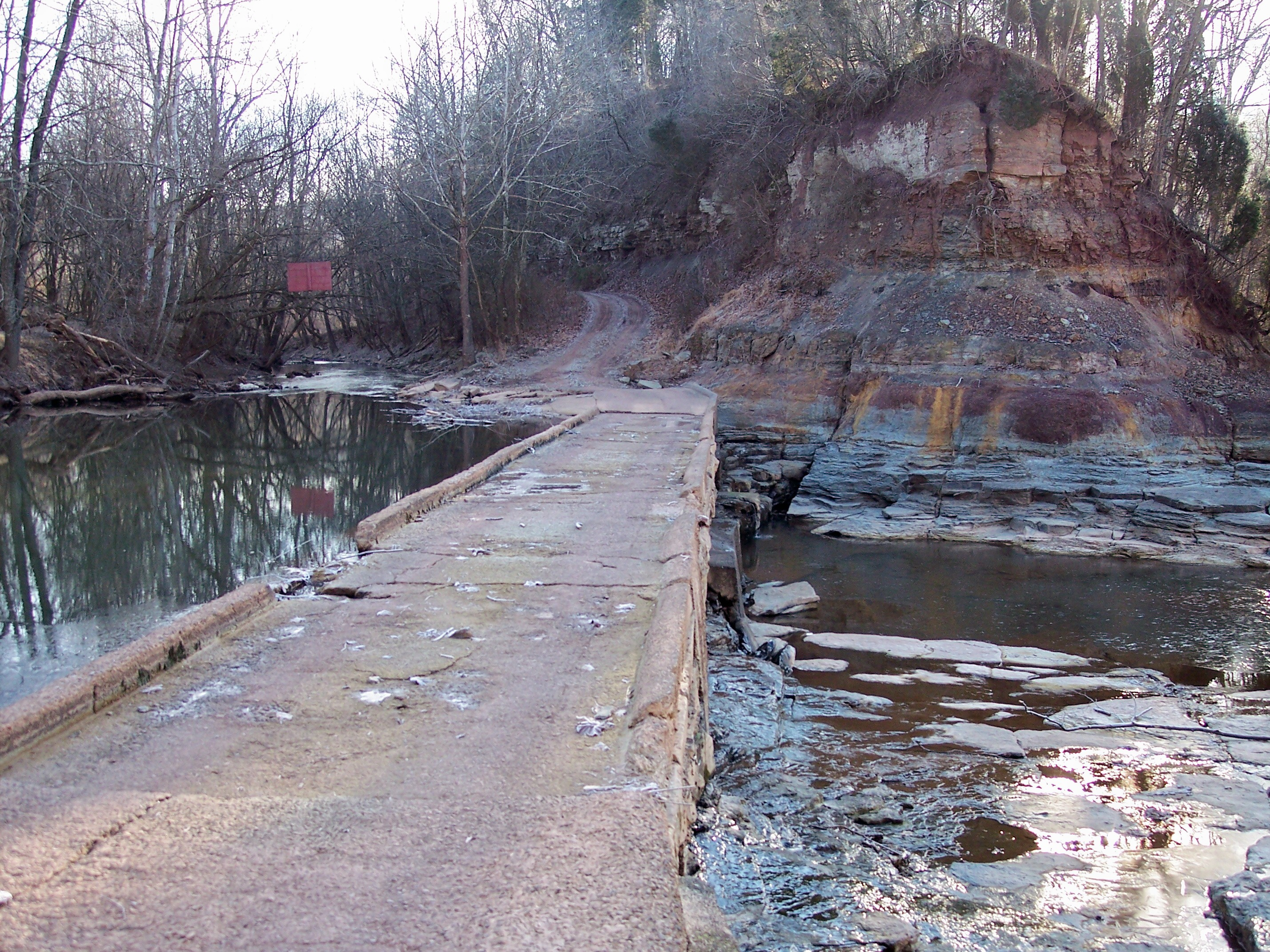
A 1947 low water bridge maintains the partial flow of Middle Island Creek (left) around the Jug. The creek emerges from the bend just to the right of the frame of the photograph.

== See also ==
- List of islands of West Virginia
