= Sandusky, West Virginia =

Sandusky
- Unincorporated community
- Location within the state of West Virginia Sandusky (the United States)
- Coordinates: 39°33′20″N 80°51′32″W
- Country: United States
- State: West Virginia
- County: Tyler
- Elevation: 741 ft (226 m)
- Time zone: UTC-5 (Eastern (EST))
  - Summer (DST): UTC-4 (EDT)
- GNIS ID: 1549911

Sandusky is an unincorporated community in Tyler County, West Virginia, United States. Its post office is closed.
