= Wilbur, West Virginia =

- Unincorporated community
- Location within West Virginia Location within the United States
- Coordinates: 39°22′35″N 80°49′28″W
- Country: United States
- State: West Virginia
- County: Tyler
- Elevation: 1,030 ft (310 m)
- Time zone: UTC-5 (Eastern (EST))
  - Summer (DST): UTC-4 (EDT)
- Area codes: 304 & 681
- GNIS feature ID: 1549127

Wilbur is an unincorporated community in Tyler County, West Virginia, United States. Wilbur is located along County Route 58, 9 miles (14 km) south-southeast of Middlebourne. Wilbur had a post office, which closed on February 1, 1988.
