= Watkins, West Virginia =

Watkins
- Unincorporated community
- Location within the state of West Virginia Watkins (the United States)
- Coordinates: 39°35′10″N 80°51′39″W
- Country: United States
- State: West Virginia
- County: Tyler
- Elevation: 1,184 ft (361 m)
- Time zone: UTC-5 (Eastern (EST))
  - Summer (DST): UTC-4 (EDT)
- GNIS ID: 1678711

Watkins was an unincorporated community in Tyler County, West Virginia, United States. Its post office is closed.
