= Polard, West Virginia =

Polard
- Unincorporated community
- Location within the state of West Virginia Polard (the United States)
- Coordinates: 39°31′18″N 80°50′53″W
- Country: United States
- State: West Virginia
- County: Tyler
- Elevation: 735 ft (224 m)
- Time zone: UTC-5 (Eastern (EST))
  - Summer (DST): UTC-4 (EDT)
- GNIS ID: 1549879

Polard is an unincorporated community in Tyler County, West Virginia, United States, along Elk Fork. Its post office is closed.
