= Middle Island (West Virginia) =

- Location within West Virginia

Geography
- Location: Ohio River, West Virginia, United States
- Coordinates: 39°24′25″N 81°12′02″W

Administration
- United States

Middle Island is a bar island on the Ohio River at St. Marys in Pleasants County, West Virginia, USA.

Middle Island lends its name to West Virginia's Middle Island Creek and lies at its confluence with "The Thoroughfare", a channel of the Ohio River that separates the island from the riverbank. A bridge (renovated in 2019) connects Middle Island to downtown St. Marys. Middle Island is protected as part of the Ohio River Islands National Wildlife Refuge.

== See also ==
- List of islands of West Virginia
