= Sancho, West Virginia =

Sancho
- Unincorporated community
- Location within the state of West Virginia Sancho (the United States)
- Coordinates: 39°25′57″N 80°55′39″W
- Country: United States
- State: West Virginia
- County: Tyler
- Elevation: 741 ft (226 m)
- Time zone: UTC-5 (Eastern (EST))
  - Summer (DST): UTC-4 (EDT)
- GNIS ID: 1678688

Sancho was an unincorporated community in Tyler County, West Virginia, United States.

The community most likely was named after nearby Sanch Creek.
