= Meeker, West Virginia =

Meeker
- Unincorporated community
- Location within the state of West Virginia Meeker (the United States)
- Coordinates: 39°27′58″N 80°47′16″W
- Country: United States
- State: West Virginia
- County: Tyler
- Elevation: 768 ft (234 m)
- Time zone: UTC-5 (Eastern (EST))
  - Summer (DST): UTC-4 (EDT)
- GNIS ID: 1555103

Meeker is an unincorporated community in Tyler County, West Virginia, United States. Its post office is closed.

Meeker Wilford Watters, an early postmaster, gave the town his name.
