= Doak, West Virginia =

Unincorporated community in West Virginia, United States

- Unincorporated community
- Location within the state of West Virginia Doak (the United States)
- Coordinates: 39°19′13″N 80°38′0″W
- Country: United States
- State: West Virginia
- County: Doddridge
- Elevation: 892 ft (272 m)
- Time zone: UTC-5 (Eastern (EST))
  - Summer (DST): UTC-4 (EDT)
- GNIS ID: 1554310

Doak is an unincorporated community in Doddridge County, West Virginia, United States, along Flint Run.
