= Link, West Virginia =

Link
- Unincorporated community
- Location within the state of West Virginia Link (the United States)
- Coordinates: 39°29′4″N 80°44′50″W
- Country: United States
- State: West Virginia
- County: Tyler
- Elevation: 1,204 ft (367 m)
- Time zone: UTC-5 (Eastern (EST))
  - Summer (DST): UTC-4 (EDT)
- GNIS ID: 1549786

Link is an unincorporated community in Tyler County, West Virginia, United States. Its post office is closed.

The community most likely was named after the local Link family.
