= Sedalia, West Virginia =

- Unincorporated community
- Location within the state of West Virginia Sedalia (the United States)
- Coordinates: 39°21′35″N 80°34′43″W
- Country: United States
- State: West Virginia
- County: Doddridge
- Elevation: 843 ft (257 m)
- Time zone: UTC-5 (Eastern (EST))
  - Summer (DST): UTC-4 (EDT)
- GNIS ID: 1546552

Sedalia is an unincorporated community in McClellan District, Doddridge County, West Virginia, United States. The community is located along Robinson Fork, a tributary of McElroy Creek. Its former post office is now closed.

The community most likely has the name of an early settler.
