= Troy, West Virginia =

- Unincorporated community
- Location within West Virginia Location within the United States
- Coordinates: 39°01′11″N 80°45′47″W
- Country: United States
- State: West Virginia
- County: Gilmer
- Incorporated: 1887
- Elevation: 751 ft (229 m)
- Time zone: UTC-5 (Eastern (EST))
  - Summer (DST): UTC-4 (EDT)
- ZIP code: 26443
- Area codes: 304 & 681
- GNIS feature ID: 1555827

Troy is an unincorporated community in Gilmer County, West Virginia, United States. Troy is located on West Virginia Route 47 along Leading Creek, 7 miles (11 km) northeast of Glenville. Troy has a post office with ZIP code 26443.

== History ==
The community was named after John Troy, a pioneer settler who served as the first postmaster. Troy was incorporated by the circuit court in 1887.
