= West Virginia Route 180 =

State highway in West Virginia, United States

West Virginia Route 180

Route information
- Maintained by WVDOH
- Length: 7.39 mi (11.89 km)

Major junctions
- South end: WV 18 near Middlebourne
- North end: WV 2 near New Martinsville

Location
- Country: United States
- State: West Virginia
- Counties: Tyler, Wetzel

Highway system
- West Virginia State Highway System; Interstate; US; State
← WV 161	→ WV 193

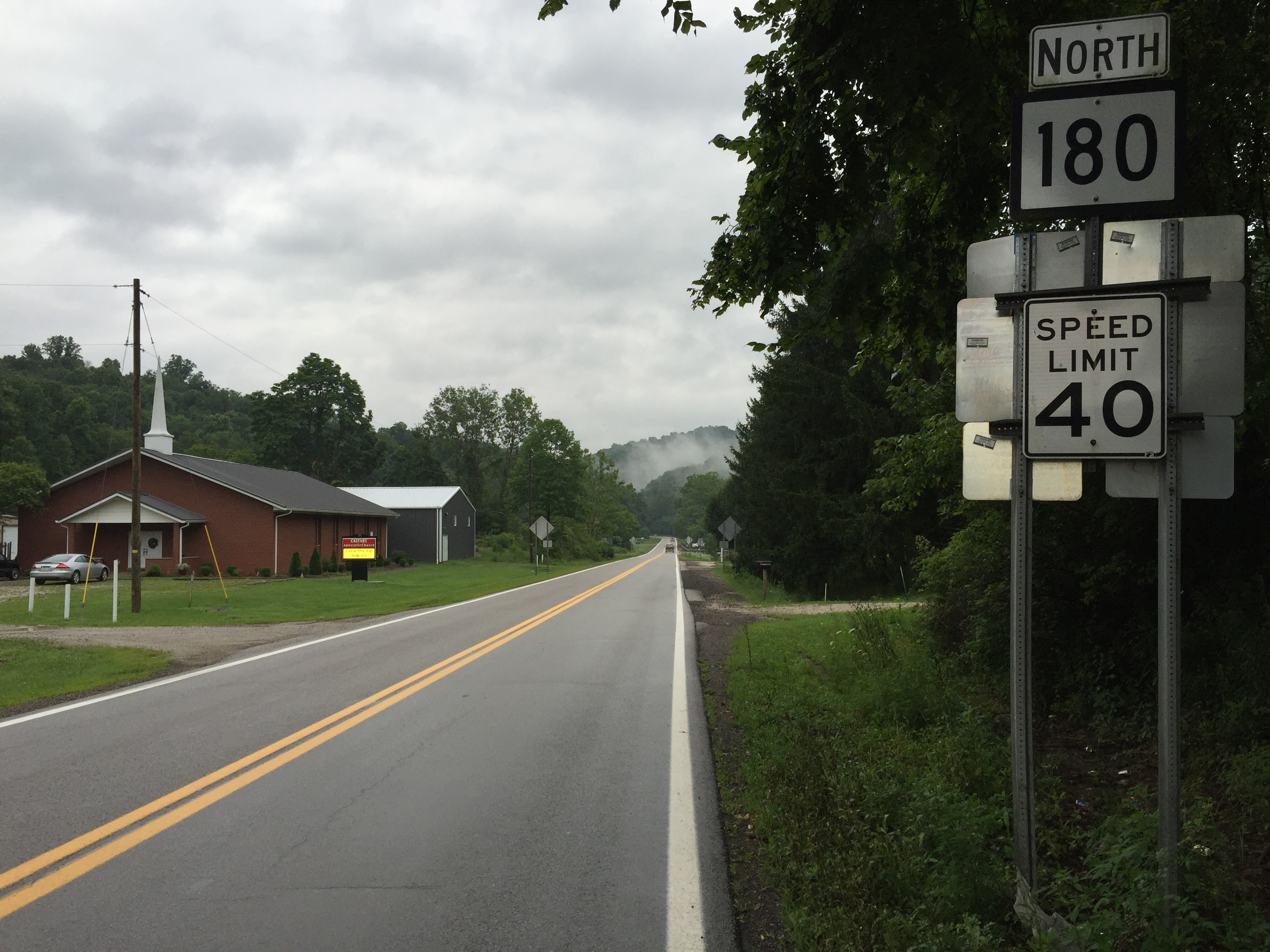
View north along WV 180 at WV 18 near Middlebourne

West Virginia Route 180 is a north–south state highway located in northern West Virginia. The southern terminus of the route is at West Virginia Route 18 north of Middlebourne. The northern terminus is at West Virginia Route 2 southwest of New Martinsville.

== History ==
WV 180 was formerly designated as Alternate WV 18.

== Major intersections ==
County	Location	mi	km	Destinations	Notes
Tyler		0.00	0.00	WV 18	
Wetzel		7.39	11.89	WV 2 – Parkersburg, Wheeling	
1.000 mi = 1.609 km; 1.000 km = 0.621 mi
