= Adonis, West Virginia =

Unincorporated community in West Virginia, United States

Adonis
- Unincorporated community
- Location within the state of West Virginia Adonis (the United States)
- Coordinates: 39°30′20″N 80°59′12″W
- Country: United States
- State: West Virginia
- County: Tyler
- Elevation: 692 ft (211 m)
- Time zone: UTC-5 (Eastern (EST))
  - Summer (DST): UTC-4 (EDT)
- GNIS ID: 1553698

Adonis is an unincorporated community in Tyler County, West Virginia, United States. Its post office is closed. Adonis is located on Adonis Ridge Road.
