= Pursley, West Virginia =

Pursley
- Unincorporated community
- Location within the state of West Virginia Pursley (the United States)
- Coordinates: 39°32′12″N 80°57′22″W
- Country: United States
- State: West Virginia
- County: Tyler
- Elevation: 774 ft (236 m)
- Time zone: UTC-5 (Eastern (EST))
  - Summer (DST): UTC-4 (EDT)
- Area code(s): 304 & 681
- GNIS ID: 1552569

Pursley is an unincorporated community in Tyler County, West Virginia, United States. Its post office is closed.

The community most likely derives its name from the surname Parsley.
