= Little, West Virginia =

Little
- Unincorporated community
- Location within the state of West Virginia Little (the United States)
- Coordinates: 39°28′29″N 80°59′49″W
- Country: United States
- State: West Virginia
- County: Tyler
- Elevation: 669 ft (204 m)
- Time zone: UTC-5 (Eastern (EST))
  - Summer (DST): UTC-4 (EDT)
- GNIS ID: 1542013

Little is an unincorporated community in Tyler County, West Virginia, United States. Its post office is currently closed.
