= Luzon Apartment Building =

- U.S. National Register of Historic Places
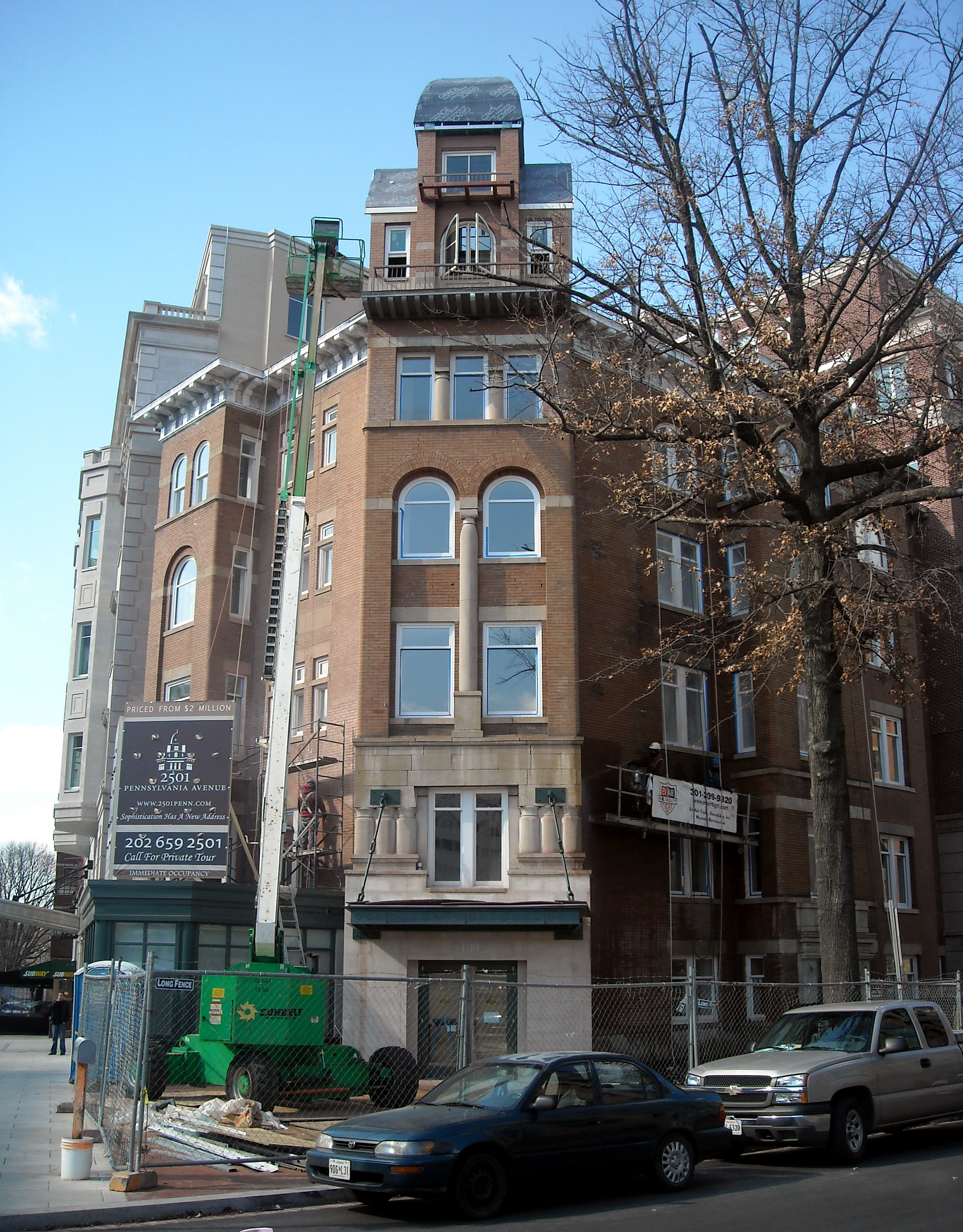

- Location within Washington, D.C.
- Location: 2501 Pennsylvania Avenue, NW; Washington, D.C.
- Coordinates: 38°54′1″N 77°0′57″W
- Built: 1896; 130 years ago
- Architect: Nicholas T. Haller
- Architectural style: Romanesque Revival
- MPS: Apartment Buildings in Washington, DC, MPS
- NRHP reference No.: 94001035
- Added to NRHP: September 7, 1994

The Luzon Apartment Building, also known as The Westover, is an historic structure located in the West End neighborhood of Washington, D.C. The building is one of the last surviving structures from the formative period of apartment buildings in the city. The Romanesque Revival building was designed by Nicholas T. Haller and completed in 1896. It was listed on the National Register of Historic Places in 1994.
