= Coxs Mills, West Virginia =

Unincorporated community in West Virginia, United States

- Unincorporated community
- Location within West Virginia Location within the United States
- Coordinates: 39°02′40″N 80°49′36″W
- Country: United States
- State: West Virginia
- County: Gilmer
- Elevation: 784 ft (239 m)
- Time zone: UTC-5 (Eastern (EST))
  - Summer (DST): UTC-4 (EDT)
- ZIP code: 26342
- Area codes: 304 & 681
- GNIS feature ID: 1537762

Coxs Mills is an unincorporated community in Gilmer County, West Virginia, United States. Coxs Mills is located on West Virginia Route 47, 7.5 miles (12.1 km) north of Glenville.
