= West Virginia Route 23 =

State highway in West Virginia, United States

West Virginia Route 23

Route information
- Maintained by WVDOH
- Length: 27.0 mi (43.5 km)

Major junctions
- South end: Main Street in Salem
- North end: WV 18 in Tyler

Location
- Country: United States
- State: West Virginia
- Counties: Tyler, Doddridge, Harrison

Highway system
- West Virginia State Highway System; Interstate; US; State
| ← US 22 | → WV 24 |

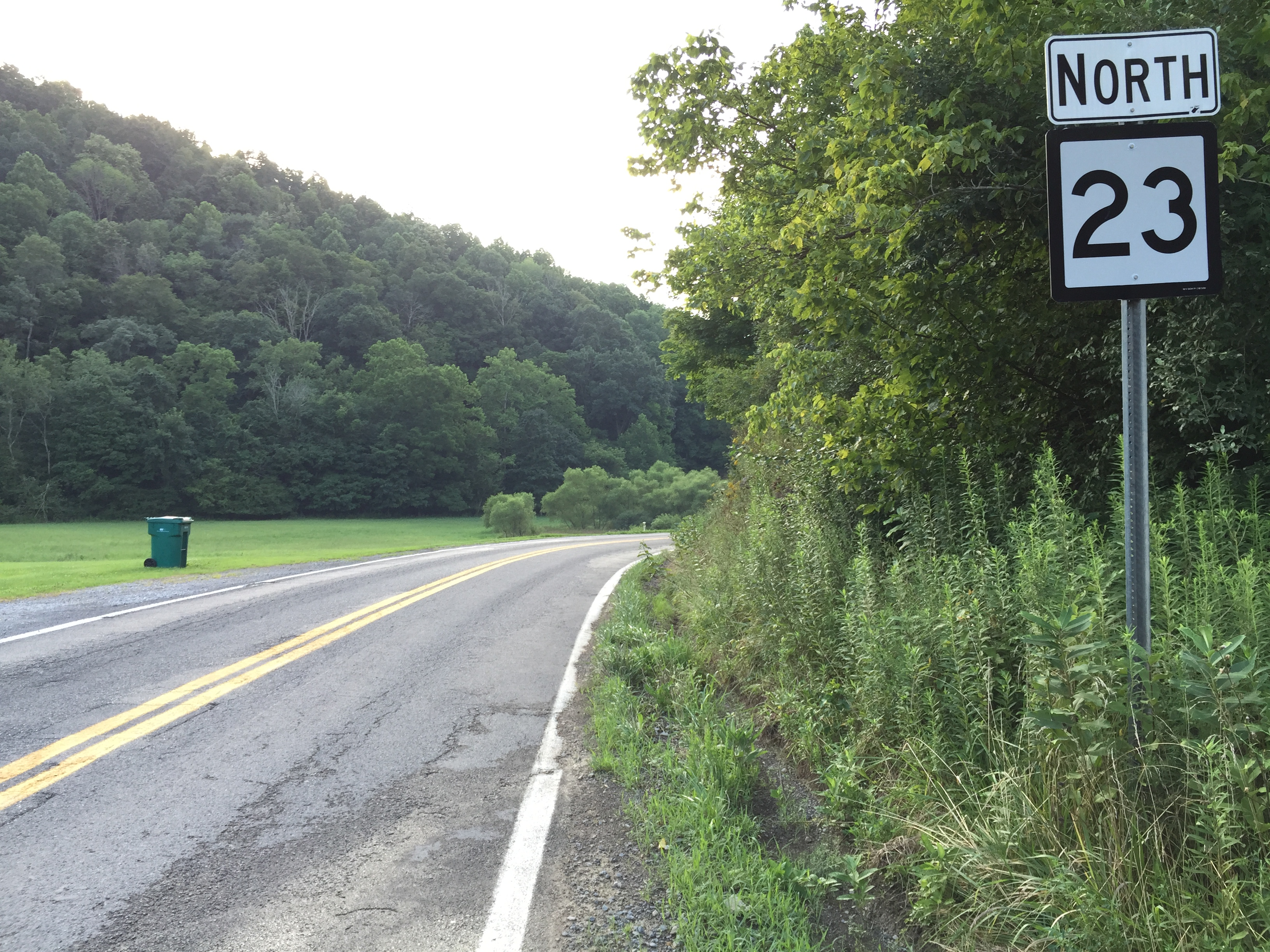
View north along WV 23 north of CR 55/10 in Sedalia

West Virginia Route 23 is a north–south state highway in the northern portion of the U.S. state of West Virginia. The northern terminus of the route is at West Virginia Route 18 in Tyler, Tyler County. The southern terminus is at old U.S. Route 50 in Salem, Harrison County.

== Major intersections ==
| County | Location | mi | km | Destinations | Notes |
|---|---|---|---|---|---|
| Harrison | Salem | | | Main Street | |
| Harrison | | | | US 50 – Parkersburg, Clarksburg | |
| Tyler | Tyler | | | WV 18 | |
1.000 mi = 1.609 km; 1.000 km = 0.621 mi
