= Long Reach, West Virginia =

- Unincorporated community
- Location within West Virginia Location within the United States
- Coordinates: 39°29′03″N 81°05′33″W
- Country: United States
- State: West Virginia
- County: Tyler
- Elevation: 646 ft (197 m)
- Time zone: UTC-5 (Eastern (EST))
  - Summer (DST): UTC-4 (EDT)
- Area codes: 304 & 681
- GNIS feature ID: 1549794

Long Reach is an unincorporated community in Tyler County, West Virginia, United States. Long Reach is located along the Ohio River and West Virginia Route 2, 2.8 miles (4.5 km) southwest of Friendly.

Long Reach is located along a 17-mile (27 km) relatively straight portion stretch of the Ohio River. This is the longest and straightest stretch of the entire river.
