= Kidwell, West Virginia =

Kidwell
- Unincorporated community
- Location within the state of West Virginia Kidwell (the United States)
- Coordinates: 39°32′3″N 80°53′28″W
- Country: United States
- State: West Virginia
- County: Tyler
- Elevation: 715 ft (218 m)
- Time zone: UTC-5 (Eastern (EST))
  - Summer (DST): UTC-4 (EDT)
- GNIS ID: 1554874

Kidwell is an unincorporated community in Tyler County, West Virginia, United States, along Point Pleasant Creek. It was also known as Glendenning. The Glendenning post office is closed.
