= Josephs Mills, West Virginia =

Josephs Mills
- Unincorporated community
- Location within the state of West Virginia Josephs Mills (the United States)
- Coordinates: 39°22′41″N 80°52′7″W
- Country: United States
- State: West Virginia
- County: Tyler
- Time zone: UTC-5 (Eastern (EST))
  - Summer (DST): UTC-4 (EDT)
- GNIS feature ID: 1541027

Josephs Mills is an unincorporated community in Tyler County, West Virginia, United States. It was the birthplace for Cecil H. Underwood, who was the Governor of West Virginia from 1957 to 1961, and from 1997 to 2001.
