= Tyler, West Virginia =

- Unincorporated community
- Location within West Virginia Location within the United States
- Coordinates: 39°25′59″N 80°49′36″W
- Country: United States
- State: West Virginia
- County: Tyler
- Elevation: 755 ft (230 m)
- Time zone: UTC-5 (Eastern (EST))
  - Summer (DST): UTC-4 (EDT)
- Area codes: 304 & 681
- GNIS feature ID: 1555847

Tyler is an unincorporated community in Tyler County, West Virginia, United States. Tyler is located on West Virginia Route 18, 6 miles (9.7 km) southeast of Middlebourne.

The William Wells House was listed on the National Register of Historic Places in 1987.
