= Tyler County, West Virginia =

County in West Virginia, United States

- County
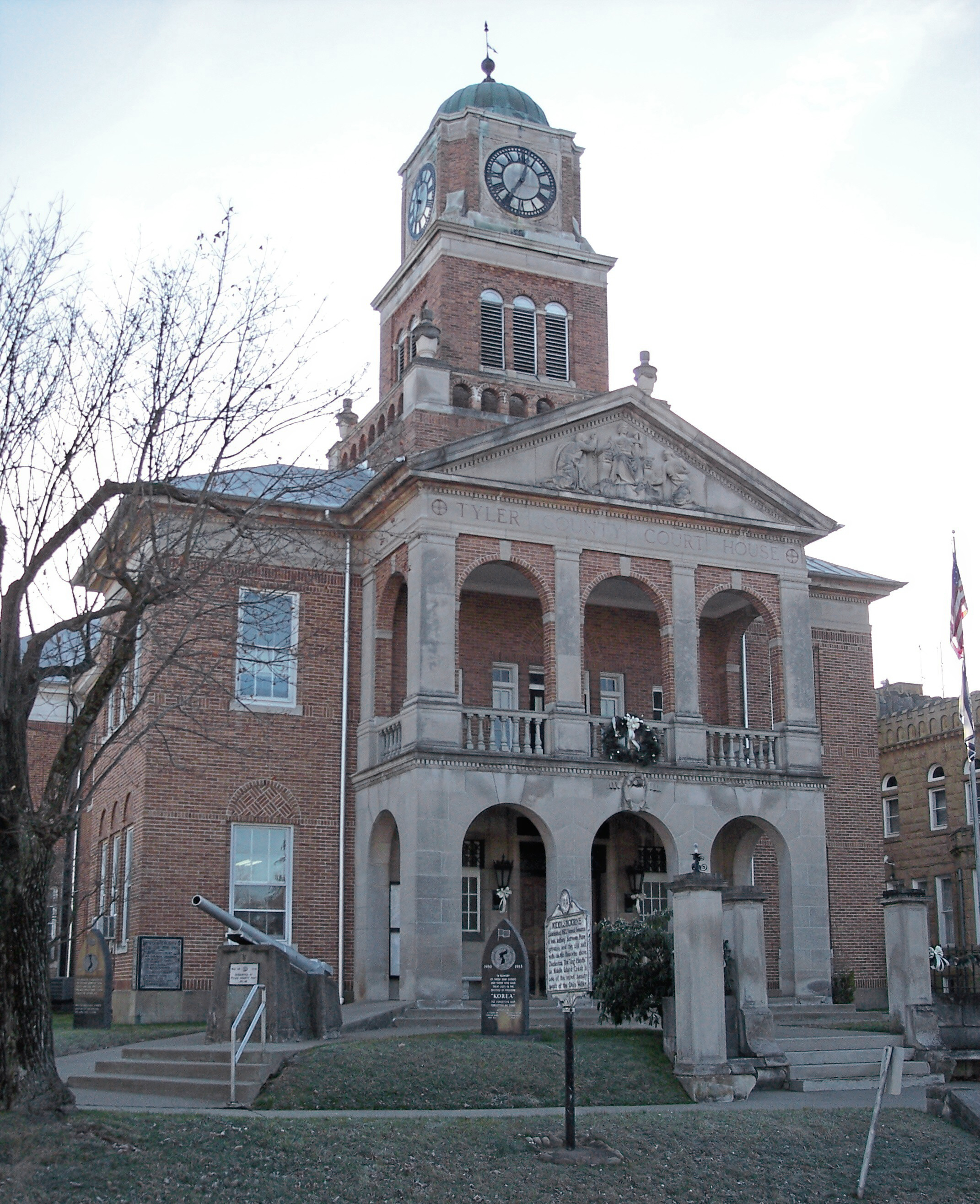
- Tyler County Courthouse in Middlebourne

- Location within the U.S. state of West Virginia
- Coordinates: 39°28′N 80°53′W
- Country: United States
- State: West Virginia
- Founded: December 6, 1814
- Named for: John Tyler Sr.
- Seat: Middlebourne
- Largest city: Paden City

Area
  - Total: 261 sq mi (680 km^{2})
  - Land: 256 sq mi (660 km^{2})
  - Water: 4.4 sq mi (11 km^{2}) 1.7%

Population (2020)
  - Total: 8,313
  - Estimate (2025): 7,881 ▼
  - Density: 32.5/sq mi (12.5/km^{2})
- Time zone: UTC−5 (Eastern)
  - Summer (DST): UTC−4 (EDT)
- Congressional district: 1st
- Website: www.tylercountywv.com

Tyler County is a county in the U.S. state of West Virginia. As of the 2020 census, the population was 8,313. Its county seat is Middlebourne. The county was founded in 1814 and is named after John Tyler, Sr., father of President John Tyler.

== History ==
The earliest white hunters (mainly of Scotch-Irish, English, and German descent) settled in what later became Tyler County in 1792 near the present town of Friendly. This area on the banks of the Ohio River was former Indian hunting grounds.

Tyler County was officially formed from a portion of what was then Ohio County, Virginia, on December 6, 1814. The following year, Middlebourne (founded 1798) became the county seat. This vast area was diminished over the years: in 1845 a small portion went the newly established Doddridge County; in 1846 the northern half went to make up the new Wetzel County; and in 1851 the southern third went to Pleasants County.

On June 20, 1863, at the height of the Civil War, Tyler was one of fifty Virginia counties that entered the Union as the state of West Virginia. Later that year, the counties were divided into civil townships, with the intention of encouraging local government. This proved impractical in the heavily rural state, and in 1872 the townships were converted into magisterial districts. Tyler County was divided into six districts: Centreville, (Note: Also spelled "Centerville" in early records.) Ellsworth, Lincoln, McElroy, Meade, and Union. Except for minor adjustments, these districts were largely unchanged until the 1980s, when they were consolidated into four new magisterial districts: Central, North, South, and West. The names and boundaries of the historic magisterial districts continued to exist in the form of tax and assessment districts.

== Geography ==
According to the United States Census Bureau, the county has a total area of 261 square miles (680 km^{2}), of which 256 square miles (660 km^{2}) is land and 4.4 square miles (11 km^{2}) (1.7%) is water.

=== Major highways ===
- WV 2
- WV 18
- WV 23
- WV 74
- WV 180

=== Adjacent counties ===
- Wetzel County (northeast)
- Doddridge County (southeast)
- Ritchie County (southwest)
- Pleasants County (west)
- Washington County, Ohio (west)
- Monroe County, Ohio (northwest)

=== National protected area ===
- Ohio River Islands National Wildlife Refuge (part)

== Demographics ==
Historical population
| Census | Pop. | Note | %± |
|---|---|---|---|
| 1820 | 2,314 | | — |
| 1830 | 4,104 | | 77.4% |
| 1840 | 6,954 | | 69.4% |
| 1850 | 5,498 | | −20.9% |
| 1860 | 6,517 | | 18.5% |
| 1870 | 7,832 | | 20.2% |
| 1880 | 11,073 | | 41.4% |
| 1890 | 11,962 | | 8.0% |
| 1900 | 18,252 | | 52.6% |
| 1910 | 16,211 | | −11.2% |
| 1920 | 14,186 | | −12.5% |
| 1930 | 12,785 | | −9.9% |
| 1940 | 12,559 | | −1.8% |
| 1950 | 10,535 | | −16.1% |
| 1960 | 10,026 | | −4.8% |
| 1970 | 9,929 | | −1.0% |
| 1980 | 11,320 | | 14.0% |
| 1990 | 9,796 | | −13.5% |
| 2000 | 9,592 | | −2.1% |
| 2010 | 9,208 | | −4.0% |
| 2020 | 8,313 | | −9.7% |
| 2025 (est.) | 7,881 | ▼ | −5.2% |
U.S. Decennial Census; 1790–1960 1900–1990; 1990–2000 2010–2020

=== 2020 census ===
As of the 2020 census, the county had a population of 8,313. Of the residents, 20.1% were under the age of 18 and 23.8% were 65 years of age or older; the median age was 47.5 years. For every 100 females there were 99.1 males, and for every 100 females age 18 and over there were 96.4 males.

There were 3,513 households in the county, of which 26.4% had children under the age of 18 living with them and 24.0% had a female householder with no spouse or partner present. About 29.0% of all households were made up of individuals and 15.2% had someone living alone who was 65 years of age or older.

Of the households, 50.1% were married couples living together and 17.6% had a male householder with no spouse present.

The racial makeup of the county was 96.0% White, 0.0% Black or African American, 0.2% American Indian and Alaska Native, 0.0% Asian, 0.2% from some other race, and 3.5% from two or more races. Hispanic or Latino residents of any race comprised 0.6% of the population.

There were 4,119 housing units, of which 14.7% were vacant. Among occupied housing units, 82.3% were owner-occupied and 17.7% were renter-occupied. The homeowner vacancy rate was 1.0% and the rental vacancy rate was 7.9%.

Tyler County, West Virginia – Racial and ethnic composition Note: the US Census treats Hispanic/Latino as an ethnic category. This table excludes Latinos from the racial categories and assigns them to a separate category. Hispanics/Latinos may be of any race.
| Race / Ethnicity (NH = Non-Hispanic) | Pop 2000 | Pop 2010 | Pop 2020 | % 2000 | % 2010 | % 2020 |
|---|---|---|---|---|---|---|
| White alone (NH) | 9,492 | 9,071 | 7,964 | 98.96% | 98.51% | 95.80% |
| Black or African American alone (NH) | 2 | 13 | 4 | 0.02% | 0.14% | 0.05% |
| Native American or Alaska Native alone (NH) | 5 | 16 | 15 | 0.05% | 0.17% | 0.18% |
| Asian alone (NH) | 8 | 12 | 3 | 0.08% | 0.13% | 0.04% |
| Pacific Islander alone (NH) | 1 | 0 | 0 | 0.01% | 0.00% | 0.00% |
| Other race alone (NH) | 1 | 1 | 13 | 0.01% | 0.01% | 0.16% |
| Mixed race or Multiracial (NH) | 42 | 46 | 261 | 0.44% | 0.50% | 3.14% |
| Hispanic or Latino (any race) | 41 | 49 | 53 | 0.43% | 0.53% | 0.64% |
| Total | 9,592 | 9,208 | 8,313 | 100.00% | 100.00% | 100.00% |

=== 2010 census ===
As of the 2010 United States census, there were 9,208 people, 3,858 households, and 2,638 families living in the county. The population density was 35.9 inhabitants per square mile (13.9/km^{2}). There were 5,000 housing units at an average density of 19.5 units per square mile (7.5 units/km^{2}). The racial makeup of the county was 99.0% white, 0.2% American Indian, 0.2% black or African American, 0.1% Asian, 0.0% from other races, and 0.5% from two or more races. Those of Hispanic or Latino origin made up 0.5% of the population. In terms of ancestry, 23.3% were German, 16.1% were English, 12.7% were Irish, and 11.8% were American.

Of the 3,858 households, 27.8% had children under the age of 18 living with them, 55.2% were married couples living together, 8.7% had a female householder with no husband present, 31.6% were non-families, and 27.2% of all households were made up of individuals. The average household size was 2.37 and the average family size was 2.84. The median age was 45.2 years.

The median income for a household in the county was $33,496 and the median income for a family was $42,209. Males had a median income of $37,414 versus $25,335 for females. The per capita income for the county was $18,245. About 12.9% of families and 18.1% of the population were below the poverty line, including 25.0% of those under age 18 and 9.8% of those age 65 or over.

=== 2000 census ===
As of the census of 2000, there were 9,592 people, 3,836 households, and 2,834 families living in the county. The population density was 37 people per square mile (14 people/km^{2}). There were 4,780 housing units at an average density of 19 units per square mile (7.3 units/km^{2}). The racial makeup of the county was 99.35% White, 0.02% Black or African American, 0.05% Native American, 0.08% Asian, 0.01% Pacific Islander, 0.03% from other races, and 0.45% from two or more races. 0.43% of the population were Hispanic or Latino of any race.

There were 3,836 households, out of which 30.30% had children under the age of 18 living with them, 61.40% were married couples living together, 8.60% had a female householder with no husband present, and 26.10% were non-families. 23.10% of all households were made up of individuals, and 12.10% had someone living alone who was 65 years of age or older. The average household size was 2.47 and the average family size was 2.89.

In the county, the population was spread out, with 23.30% under the age of 18, 6.50% from 18 to 24, 26.90% from 25 to 44, 26.90% from 45 to 64, and 16.50% who were 65 years of age or older. The median age was 41 years. For every 100 females there were 95.50 males. For every 100 females age 18 and over, there were 94.90 males.

The median income for a household in the county was $29,290, and the median income for a family was $35,320. Males had a median income of $34,250 versus $18,140 for females. The per capita income for the county was $15,216. About 12.20% of families and 16.60% of the population were below the poverty line, including 24.00% of those under age 18 and 12.70% of those age 65 or over.

== Politics ==
After having leaned strongly towards the Democratic Party between the New Deal and Bill Clinton's presidency, most of West Virginia has since 2000 seen an extremely rapid swing towards the Republican Party. In contrast, Tyler County, along with neighboring Doddridge County and Ritchie County were historically powerfully Unionist and have been rock-ribbed Republican since the Civil War. The only Democratic presidential candidates to have won Tyler County since West Virginia's statehood are Woodrow Wilson in 1912, who won by just 64 votes, and Bill Clinton in 1996. Clinton's win in 1996 is the last time a Democrat has tallied 40 percent of the county's vote, and one of only three times the Democrats have done so since Franklin Roosevelt.

United States presidential election results for Tyler County, West Virginia
| Year | Republican | | Democratic | | Third party(ies) | |
| Year | No. | % | No. | % | No. | % |
|---|---|---|---|---|---|---|
| 1912 | 706 | 22.08% | 1,193 | 37.30% | 1,299 | 40.62% |
| 1916 | 1,900 | 57.51% | 1,336 | 40.44% | 68 | 2.06% |
| 1920 | 3,654 | 66.33% | 1,762 | 31.98% | 93 | 1.69% |
| 1924 | 3,425 | 60.38% | 2,137 | 37.68% | 110 | 1.94% |
| 1928 | 3,881 | 70.14% | 1,591 | 28.75% | 61 | 1.10% |
| 1932 | 3,734 | 58.44% | 2,582 | 40.41% | 74 | 1.16% |
| 1936 | 4,031 | 61.46% | 2,509 | 38.25% | 19 | 0.29% |
| 1940 | 4,354 | 68.24% | 2,026 | 31.76% | 0 | 0.00% |
| 1944 | 3,429 | 70.60% | 1,428 | 29.40% | 0 | 0.00% |
| 1948 | 3,160 | 66.48% | 1,579 | 33.22% | 14 | 0.29% |
| 1952 | 3,488 | 69.61% | 1,523 | 30.39% | 0 | 0.00% |
| 1956 | 3,671 | 73.58% | 1,318 | 26.42% | 0 | 0.00% |
| 1960 | 3,537 | 69.42% | 1,558 | 30.58% | 0 | 0.00% |
| 1964 | 2,522 | 52.57% | 2,275 | 47.43% | 0 | 0.00% |
| 1968 | 2,897 | 63.90% | 1,324 | 29.20% | 313 | 6.90% |
| 1972 | 3,362 | 74.93% | 1,125 | 25.07% | 0 | 0.00% |
| 1976 | 2,514 | 58.05% | 1,817 | 41.95% | 0 | 0.00% |
| 1980 | 2,707 | 61.78% | 1,482 | 33.82% | 193 | 4.40% |
| 1984 | 3,170 | 69.29% | 1,395 | 30.49% | 10 | 0.22% |
| 1988 | 2,365 | 61.05% | 1,501 | 38.75% | 8 | 0.21% |
| 1992 | 1,593 | 37.90% | 1,587 | 37.76% | 1,023 | 24.34% |
| 1996 | 734 | 26.40% | 1,459 | 52.48% | 587 | 21.12% |
| 2000 | 2,582 | 65.73% | 1,214 | 30.91% | 132 | 3.36% |
| 2004 | 2,798 | 65.91% | 1,401 | 33.00% | 46 | 1.08% |
| 2008 | 2,415 | 64.55% | 1,241 | 33.17% | 85 | 2.27% |
| 2012 | 2,314 | 70.44% | 890 | 27.09% | 81 | 2.47% |
| 2016 | 2,996 | 81.15% | 507 | 13.73% | 189 | 5.12% |
| 2020 | 3,226 | 82.23% | 631 | 16.08% | 66 | 1.68% |
| 2024 | 2,991 | 82.69% | 554 | 15.32% | 72 | 1.99% |

== Attractions ==
=== Festivals ===
- Sisters Fest, Sistersville, mid-March
- Tyler County Fair, Middlebourne, early August
- Heroes Day, Sistersville, early September
- West Virginia Oil & Gas Festival, Sistersville, mid-September
- Sistersville Marble Festival, Sistersville, late September
- Middle Island Harvest Festival, Middlebourne, early October

=== Historical ===
- Sistersville Ferry, Sistersville
- Tyler County Museum, Middlebourne. Previously Tyler County High School, replaced by Tyler Consolidated High School in 1993
- Wells Inn, Sistersville

=== Natural ===
- Conaway Run Lake Wildlife Management Area, near Centerville (man-made)
- The Jug Wildlife Management Area, near Middlebourne

=== Other attractions ===
- Tyler County Speedway, Middlebourne

== Communities ==
=== Magisterial districts ===
==== Current ====
- Central
- North
- South
- West

==== Historic ====
- Centreville
- Ellsworth
- Lincoln
- McElroy
- Meade
- Union

=== Cities, Towns, and Villages ===
- Friendly
- Middlebourne (county seat)
- Paden City
- Sistersville

=== Unincorporated communities ===
A

- Adonis
- Akron
- Alma

B

- Bens Run
- Bert
- Big Moses
- Blue
- Booher
- Braden

C

- Centerville
- Conaway

D

- Dale

E

- Everett

F

- Frew

I

- Iuka

J

- Josephs Mills

K

- Kidwell

L

- Link
- Little
- Long Reach
- Luzon

M

- McKim
- Meeker

P

- Plum Run
- Polard
- Pursley

S

- Sancho
- Sandusky
- Shiloh
- Shirley
- Stringtown
- Sunnyside

T

- Tyler

V

- Vincen

W

- Watkins
- Wick
- Wilbur

== Notable people ==
- Wilbur Cooper (1892-1973) — Major League Baseball pitcher (1912–26), who spent most of his career with the Pittsburgh Pirates. Born on Davis Run.
- Arthur I. Boreman (1823–96) — West Virginia's first governor, moved to Middlebourne as an infant. He received his education and was admitted to the bar while resident here in 1845.
- Cecil H. Underwood (1922-2008) — Twice governor of West Virginia, he was the 25th and 32nd Governor of West Virginia, from 1957 until 1961 and from 1997 until 2001. He was born in Josephs Mills and graduated from Middlebourne High School in 1940.

== See also ==
- National Register of Historic Places listings in Tyler County, West Virginia
