= National Register of Historic Places listings in Doddridge County, West Virginia =

Location of Doddridge County in West Virginia

This is a list of the National Register of Historic Places listings in Doddridge County, West Virginia.

This is intended to be a complete list of the properties and districts on the National Register of Historic Places in Doddridge County, West Virginia, United States. The locations of National Register properties and districts for which the latitude and longitude coordinates are included below, may be seen in a Google map.

There are 9 properties and districts listed on the National Register in the county.

This National Park Service list is complete through NPS recent listings posted March 21, 2025.

Contents: Counties in West Virginia

Barbour - Berkeley - Boone - Braxton - Brooke - Cabell - Calhoun - Clay - Doddridge - Fayette - Gilmer - Grant - Greenbrier - Hampshire - Hancock - Hardy - Harrison - Jackson - Jefferson - Kanawha - Lewis - Lincoln - Logan - Marion - Marshall - Mason - McDowell - Mercer - Mineral - Mingo - Monongalia - Monroe - Morgan - Nicholas - Ohio - Pendleton - Pleasants - Pocahontas - Preston - Putnam - Raleigh - Randolph - Ritchie - Roane - Summers - Taylor - Tucker - Tyler - Upshur - Wayne - Webster - Wetzel - Wirt - Wood - Wyoming

== Current listings ==
	Name on the Register	Image	Date listed	Location	City or town	Description
1	Center Point Covered Bridge	Center Point Covered Bridge	August 29, 1983 (#83003235)	County Route 10 just north of WV 23; 39°23′22″N 80°38′04″W	Center Point	
2	Lathrop Russell Charter House	Lathrop Russell Charter House	March 25, 1993 (#93000219)	109 High St. 39°17′39″N 80°46′23″W	West Union	
3	Doddridge County Courthouse	Doddridge County Courthouse	March 18, 1982 (#82004316)	Court Sq. 39°17′39″N 80°46′28″W	West Union	
4	Gamsjager-Wysong Farm		September 4, 1986 (#86002181)	County Route 66; 39°07′28″N 80°41′33″W	St. Clara	
5	Krenn School	Krenn School	March 29, 1989 (#89000181)	County Route 66/Little Buck Run Rd. 39°07′25″N 80°41′26″W	New Milton	
6	Silas P. Smith Opera House	Silas P. Smith Opera House	July 25, 2001 (#01000788)	117 Court St. 39°17′38″N 80°46′30″W	West Union	
7	W. Scott Stuart House	W. Scott Stuart House	March 25, 1993 (#93000220)	104 Chancery St. 39°17′38″N 80°46′28″W	West Union	
8	West Union Downtown Historic District	West Union Downtown Historic District	May 22, 2003 (#03000458)	Roughly bounded by the Baltimore & Ohio railroad line, Court St, and Cottage St. 39°17′41″N 80°46′31″W	West Union	
9	West Union Residential Historic District	West Union Residential Historic District	December 14, 2010 (#10001029)	Roughly bounded by Court St., Stuart St., Wood St., and Garrison Ave. 39°17′35″N 80°46′33″W	West Union	

== See also ==
- List of National Historic Landmarks in West Virginia
- National Register of Historic Places listings in West Virginia
