= Maxwell =

Maxwell may refer to:

== People ==
- Maxwell (given name)
- Maxwell (surname)
- Justice Maxwell (disambiguation)
- Maxwell baronets, in the Baronetage of Nova Scotia
- Maxwell (footballer, born 1979), Brazilian forward
- Maxwell (footballer, born 1981), Brazilian left-back
- Maxwell (footballer, born 1986), Brazilian striker
- Maxwell (footballer, born 1989), Brazilian left-back
- Maxwell (footballer, born 1995), Brazilian forward
- Maxwell (musician) (born 1973), American R&B and neo-soul singer

== Places ==
=== United States ===
- Maxwell, California
- Maxwell, Indiana
- Maxwell, Iowa
- Maxwell, Nebraska
- Maxwell, New Mexico
- Maxwell, Texas
- Maxwell Air Force Base, Alabama
- Maxwell Street, Chicago, Illinois
- Maxwell Township (disambiguation)

=== Elsewhere ===
- Maxwell, Ontario (disambiguation), multiple locations in Canada
- Maxwell MRT station, in Singapore
- Maxwell Hill, in Perak, Malaysia
- Maxwelltown, Scotland
- Pākaraka, New Zealand, formerly known as Maxwell

=== In space ===
- Maxwell (crater), on the Moon
- 12760 Maxwell, a main-belt asteroid
- Maxwell Montes, on Venus

== Arts and entertainment ==
- Maxwell (film), a 2007 film about Robert Maxwell
- Maxwell, an 1830 novel by Theodore Hook
- Maxwell the pig, in the GEICO commercials
- Maxwell, the main protagonist of the Scribblenauts series
- Maxwell, the antagonist then turned protagonist of the Don't Starve series

== Businesses and organisations ==
- Maxwell Motor Company, an American automobile manufacturer 1904–1925
- Maxwell Technologies, an American developer and manufacturer

- Maxwell School, in Kuala Lumpur, Malaysia
- Maxwell School of Citizenship and Public Affairs, of Syracuse University, U.S.
- Maxwell International Bahá'í School, formerly in Shawnigan Lake, British Columbia, Canada
- William H. Maxwell Career and Technical Education High School, in Brooklyn, New York, U.S.
- Maxwell's, a bar/restaurant and music club in Hoboken, New Jersey, U.S.

== Science and technology ==
- Maxwell (microarchitecture), a graphics processor architecture developed by Nvidia
- Maxwell (unit), the cgs unit of magnetic flux
- Maxwell Render, 3D rendering engine software
- Maxwell's equations, describing the behavior of electric and magnetic fields
- Maxwell relations, a set of equations in thermodynamics

== Other uses ==
- Maxwell (1804 ship), an American-built British merchant ship
- Maxwell Award, presented by the Maxwell Football Club for the American football College Player of the Year

== See also ==
- Maxwell's theorem, in probability theory
- Maxwell's theorem (geometry)
- James Clerk Maxwell Telescope, on Mauna Kea, Hawaii
- Maxwell House (disambiguation)
- Maxell
