= Central Station, West Virginia =

Unincorporated community in West Virginia, United States

- Unincorporated community
- Location within West Virginia Location within the United States
- Coordinates: 39°17′38″N 80°49′32″W
- Country: United States
- State: West Virginia
- County: Doddridge
- Elevation: 801 ft (244 m)
- Time zone: UTC-5 (Eastern (EST))
  - Summer (DST): UTC-4 (EDT)
- Area codes: 304 & 681
- GNIS feature ID: 1554100

Central Station is an unincorporated community in Doddridge County, West Virginia, United States. Central Station is 2.5 miles (4.0 km) west of West Union.
