= West Union Covered Bridge (West Virginia) =

United States historic place

Coordinates: 39.2927894°N 80.7708965°W

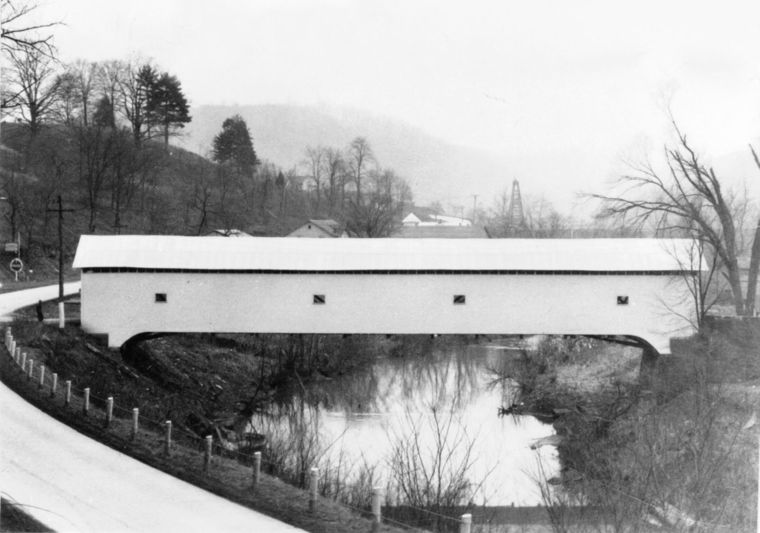
The West Union Covered Bridge as it appeared in the early 20th century.

The West Union Covered Bridge (1843), on Middle Island Creek, was a local historical landmark of West Union, West Virginia, USA, until its destruction in a flood in 1950. It was one of more than 100 covered bridges constructed throughout the state in the mid- and late 19th century.

== History ==
The locally celebrated bridge replaced an earlier one built at the settlement then called Lewisport. According to an early resident, A.A. Bee, "The first bridge across Middle Island Creek [at West Union] was of hewed logs with a center abutment of stones. In the great flood of 1835 it was washed away".

In 1842, a contract for a replacement was awarded to the well-known civil engineer Colonel Benoît "Claudius" Crozet (1789–1864). (Crozet was an immigrant from France who had served in the French military and later taught at the U.S. Military Academy at West Point, as well as helping found the Virginia Military Institute.) The new covered bridge at West Union was part of a series of public works along the Northwestern Turnpike which stretched from Winchester west to the Ohio River through what was then all the state of Virginia. Ephraim Bee (1802–1888), a local blacksmith, magistrate, and state legislator, made all the iron bolts and bands for the bridge, which was completed in 1843.

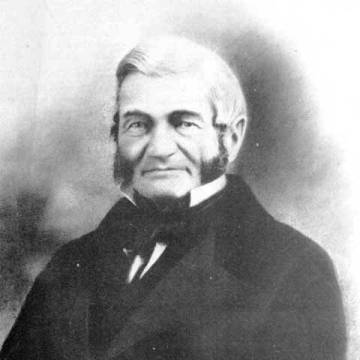
Crozet was a French civil engineer who immigrated to the U.S. becoming known as the "Pathfinder of the Blue Ridge".

The West Union Covered Bridge was destroyed after 107 years in a long-remembered flood that devastated the region in June 1950. The inundation also destroyed homes and businesses, killing more than 20 people throughout Doddridge County. The bridge collapsed into the river below, and, because officials feared that it would dam the flood water and create more problems, the still intact wooden structure was demolished.

== See also ==
- List of covered bridges in West Virginia
