= Virginia State Route 21 =

State Route 21 may refer to:

- State Route 21 (Virginia 1918-1933), now U.S. Route 211 and its former extension along U.S. Route 29 to Washington, D.C.
- U.S. Route 21 (Virginia), from 1926

== See also ==
- Virginia's 21st congressional district (VA 21)
