= Justice Maxwell =

Justice Maxwell may refer to:

- Augustus Maxwell (1820–1903), associate justice and chief justice of the Florida Supreme Court
- Edwin Maxwell (politician) (1825–1903), associate justice of the Supreme Court of Appeals of West Virginia
- Evelyn C. Maxwell (1863–1954), associate justice of the Florida Supreme Court
- Ralph L. Maxwell (1905–1956), associate justice of the Supreme Court of Illinois
- Haymond Maxwell (1879–1958), associate justice of the Supreme Court of Appeals of West Virginia
