= Krenn School =

- U.S. National Register of Historic Places
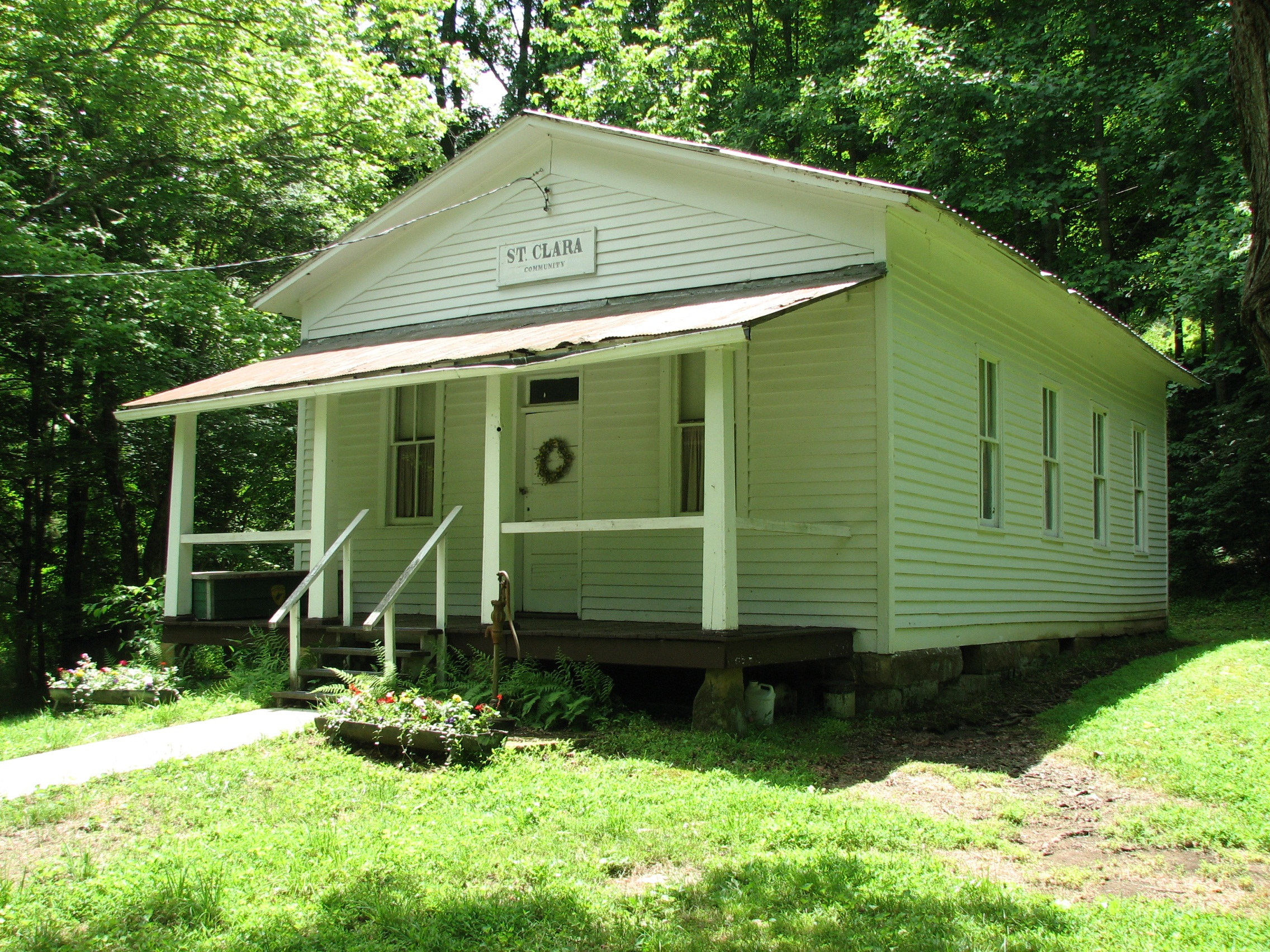

- Location within West Virginia Location within the United States
- Location: Co. Rt. 66/Little Buck Run Rd., New Milton, West Virginia
- Coordinates: 39°07′25″N 80°41′26″W
- Area: 0.3 acres (0.12 ha)
- Built: 1897
- Architectural style: Gabled 1-room plan
- NRHP reference No.: 89000181
- Added to NRHP: March 29, 1989

Krenn School, also known as St. Clara Community Building, is a historic one-room school building located at New Milton, Doddridge County, West Virginia. It was built in 1897, and is a one-story rectangular, wood-frame building measuring 35 feet deep and 24 feet wide. It has a low pitched gable roof covered in corrugated metal. The building was renovated in 1922. It was used as a school until the late 1930s, at which time it became a community center.

It was listed on the National Register of Historic Places in 1989.
