= Silas P. Smith Opera House =

- U.S. National Register of Historic Places
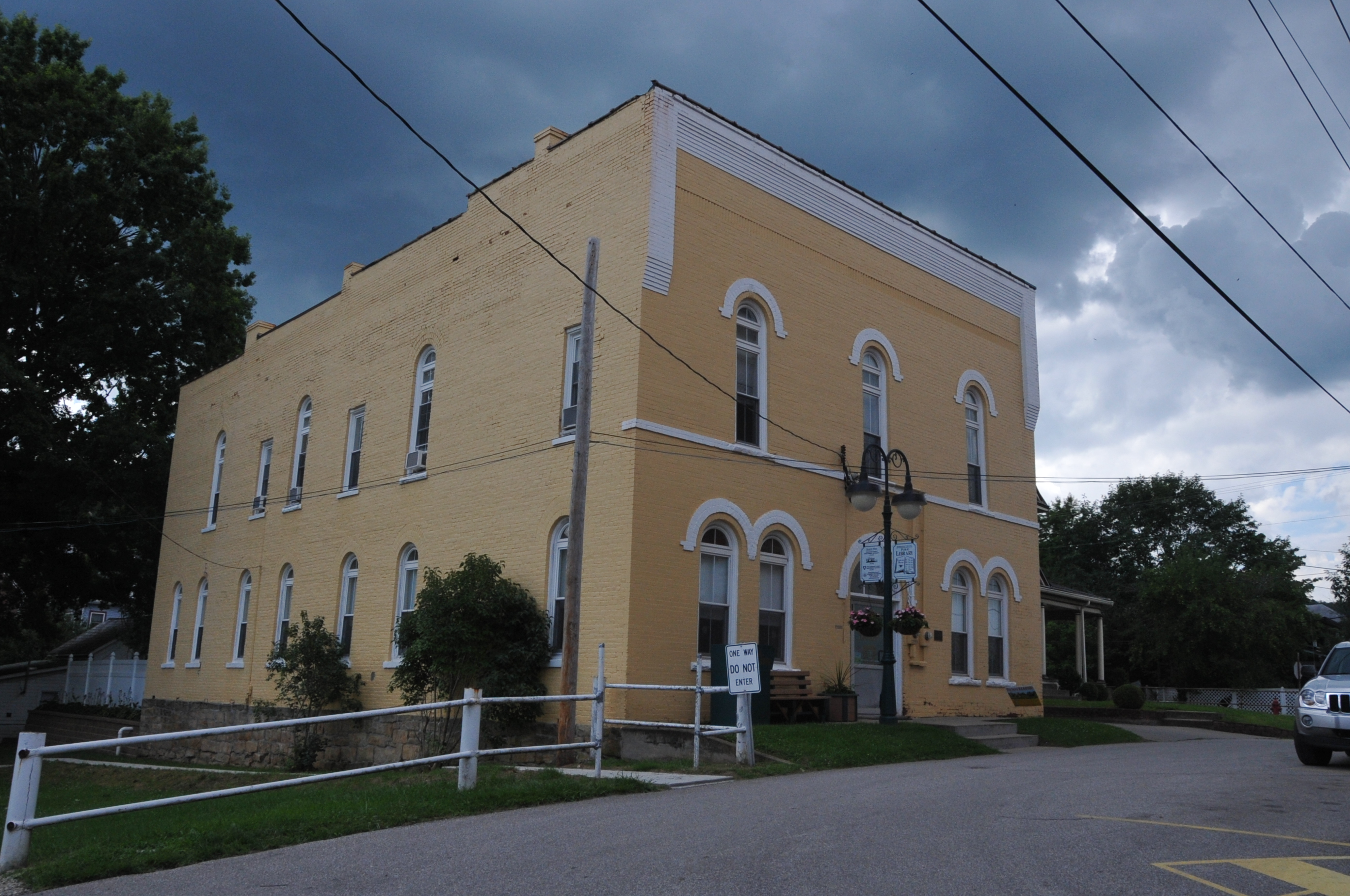
- Front and eastern side

- Location within West Virginia Location within the United States
- Location: 117 Court St., West Union, West Virginia
- Coordinates: 39°17′38″N 80°46′30″W
- Area: less than one acre
- Built: 1900
- Architectural style: Early Commercial, Romanesque
- NRHP reference No.: 01000788
- Added to NRHP: July 25, 2001

Silas P. Smith Opera House was a historic theatre located at West Union, Doddridge County, West Virginia. It was built in 1900, and was a two-story brick commercial building measuring 40 feet (12 m) wide and 70 feet (21 m) deep. It had simple Romanesque Revival style architectural details. At one time, the building housed the Doddridge County Public Library. It was demolished on November 13, 2019. It was included in both the West Union Downtown Historic District and the West Union Residential Historic District.

It was listed on the National Register of Historic Places in 2001.
