= William Smith (Virginia representative) =

Congressman from Virginia

Member of the U.S. House of Representatives from Virginia
- In office March 4, 1821 – March 4, 1827
- Preceded by: Ballard Smith (7th); Thomas Newton Jr. (21st)
- Succeeded by: Jabez Leftwich (7th); Lewis Maxwell (21st)
- Constituency: 7th district (1821-23); 21st district (1823-27)

Personal details
- Born: Unknown Chesterfield County, Virginia
- Died: Unknown
- Party: Jacksonian
- Other political affiliations: Democratic-Republican

William Smith was an eighteenth- and nineteenth-century congressman from Virginia.

== Life and career ==
Born in Chesterfield, Virginia, Smith graduated from the College of William and Mary in 1807. He studied law and relocated to Greenbrier County, Virginia.

During the War of 1812, Smith served as a captain of artillery, stationed in Norfolk, Virginia.

Smith was first elected to the House of Delegates for the session of 1819/20.

He was elected a Democratic-Republican, Crawford Republican, and Jacksonian to the United States House of Representatives in 1820, serving from 1821 to 1827.

Smith served a second time in the House of Delegates for the session of 1828/29.

Smith was elected to the Virginia Constitutional Convention of 1829-1830 from Greenbrier County, serving from a district made up of Monroe, Greenbriar, Bath, Botetourt, Alleghay, Pocahontas and Nicolas. He served there on the Committee on the Executive Department.

In the 1840s, Smith was an aide to Democratic Governor James McDowell 1843–46, and served as a presidential elector in 1844.

Smith was elected to the Virginia Constitutional Convention of 1850 from Greenbrier County, serving from a district made up of Greenbrier County, from an Assembly district made up of the transmontane Greenbrier, Pocahontas, Fayette, Raleigh, Nicholas and Kanawha Counties.

In the 1850s, Smith served from Greenbriar in the Virginia Senate in the sessions of 1857/58 and 1859/60. On the eve of the American Civil War, he again served in January 1861.

== Election of 1821 ==
Smith was elected to the U.S. House of Representatives with 53.17% of the vote, defeating fellow Democratic-Republican James Wilson.

== Bibliography ==
- "Biographical Directory of the United States Congress, 1774 - Present". bioguide.congress.gov. United States Congress. Archived from the original on April 23, 2010.
- Pulliam, David Loyd (1901). The Constitutional Conventions of Virginia from the foundation of the Commonwealth to the present time. John T. West, Richmond. ISBN 978-1-2879-2059-5.
- Swem, Earl Greg (1918). A Register of the General Assembly of Virginia, 1776-1918, and of the Constitutional Conventions. David Bottom, Superintendent of Public Printing. ISBN 978-1-3714-6242-0.

U.S. House of Representatives
Preceded by Ballard Smith	Member of the U.S. House of Representatives from Virginia's 7th congressional district 1821–1823	Succeeded by Jabez Leftwich
Preceded by Thomas Newton Jr.	Member of the U.S. House of Representatives from Virginia's 21st congressional district 1823–1827	Succeeded by Lewis Maxwell
