= Stedman, North Carolina =

- Town
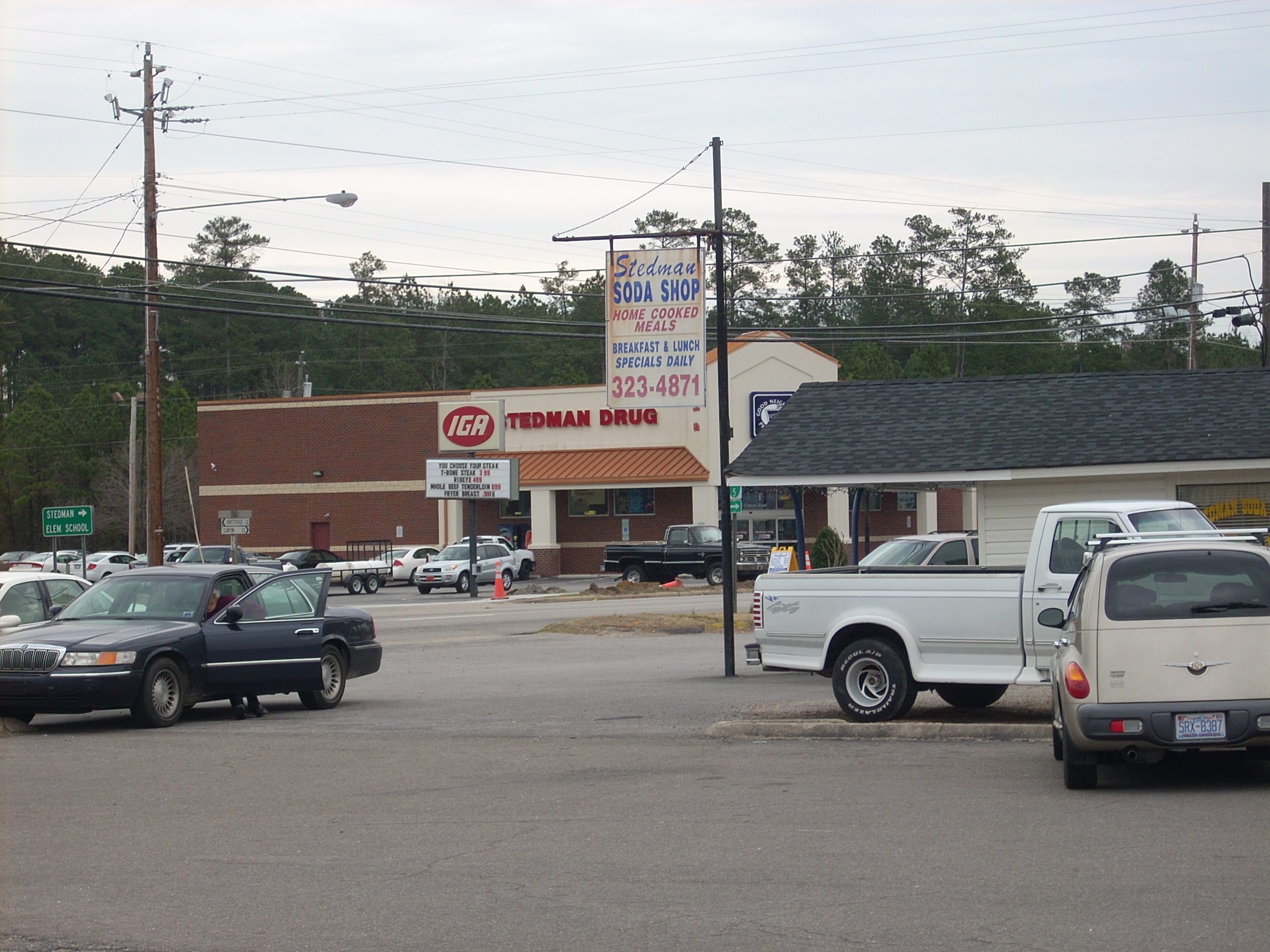
- Stedman Soda Shop and Stedman Drug

- Seal

- Location in Cumberland County and the state of North Carolina.
- Coordinates: 35°00′42″N 78°41′59″W
- Country: United States
- State: North Carolina
- County: Cumberland
- Settled: 1841
- Incorporated: 1917

Government
  - Mayor: Martin L. Jones

Area
  - Total: 1.69 sq mi (4.37 km^{2})
  - Land: 1.69 sq mi (4.37 km^{2})
  - Water: 0 sq mi (0.00 km^{2})
- Elevation: 128 ft (39 m)

Population (2020)
  - Total: 1,277
  - Density: 756.6/sq mi (292.13/km^{2})
- Time zone: UTC-5 (Eastern (EST))
  - Summer (DST): UTC-4 (EDT)
- ZIP code: 28391
- Area codes: 910, 472
- FIPS code: 37-64840
- GNIS feature ID: 2406663
- Website: www.townofstedman.com

Stedman is a town in Cumberland County, North Carolina, United States. As of the 2020 census, Stedman had a population of 1,277. It is named for Civil War Major Charles Manly Stedman.

== History ==
Stedman was settled in 1841 when John Culbreth Blocker built a stagecoach house and post office on land that he had purchased. The town was incorporated in 1917.

The Maxwell House was listed on the National Register of Historic Places in 1985.

== Geography ==
Stedman is located in eastern Cumberland County. North Carolina Highway 24 passes through the town, leading west 11 miles (18 km) to Fayetteville, the county seat, and east 22 miles (35 km) to Clinton.

According to the United States Census Bureau, the town has a total area of 2.1 square miles (5.4 km^{2}), all land.

== Demographics ==
Historical population
Census	Pop.	Note	%±
1920	121		—
1930	289		138.8%
1940	356		23.2%
1950	424		19.1%
1960	458		8.0%
1970	505		10.3%
1980	723		43.2%
1990	577		−20.2%
2000	664		15.1%
2010	1,028		54.8%
2020	1,277		24.2%
U.S. Decennial Census

=== 2020 census ===
Stedman racial composition
Race	Number	Percentage
White (non-Hispanic)	939	73.53%
Black or African American (non-Hispanic)	129	10.1%
Native American	15	1.17%
Asian	8	0.63%
Other/Mixed	105	8.22%
Hispanic or Latino	81	6.34%

As of the 2020 United States census, there were 1,277 people, 501 households, and 329 families residing in the town.

=== 2000 census ===
As of the census of 2000, there were 664 people, 261 households, and 196 families residing in the town. The population density was 484.0 inhabitants per square mile (186.9/km^{2}). There were 286 housing units at an average density of 208.5 per square mile (80.5/km^{2}). The racial makeup of the town was 82.53% White, 12.50% African American, 1.05% Native American, 0.45% Asian, 0.15% Pacific Islander, 1.20% from other races, and 2.11% from two or more races. Hispanic or Latino of any race were 2.41% of the population.

There were 261 households, out of which 32.2% had children under the age of 18 living with them, 57.1% were married couples living together, 12.6% had a female householder with no husband present, and 24.9% were non-families. 20.7% of all households were made up of individuals, and 7.7% had someone living alone who was 65 years of age or older. The average household size was 2.54 and the average family size was 2.93.

In the town, the population was spread out, with 23.8% under the age of 18, 7.1% from 18 to 24, 28.8% from 25 to 44, 28.2% from 45 to 64, and 12.2% who were 65 years of age or older. The median age was 40 years. For every 100 females, there were 96.4 males. For every 100 females age 18 and over, there were 89.5 males.

The median income for a household in the town was $47,321, and the median income for a family was $55,294. Males had a median income of $36,250 versus $21,875 for females. The per capita income for the town was $19,233. About 4.3% of families and 10.0% of the population were below the poverty line, including 18.8% of those under age 18 and 12.3% of those age 65 or over.
