= Wayne Underwood =

American football player (1913–1967)

Profile
- Position: Tackle

Personal information
- Born: December 8, 1913; West Union, West Virginia, U.S.
- Died: October 26, 1967 (aged 53); Grantsville, West Virginia, U.S.
- Listed height: 6 ft 1 in (1.85 m)
- Listed weight: 190 lb (86 kg)

Career information
- College: Marshall

Career history
- Cleveland Rams (1937)
- Stats at Pro Football Reference

Ivory "Wayne" Underwood (December 8, 1913 – October 26, 1967) was an American football tackle who played one season with the Cleveland Rams of the National Football League (NFL). He played college football at Marshall University.

== Professional career ==
Underwood played in three games for the Cleveland Rams in 1937.

== Personal life ==
Underwood went on to become a high school football coach and head of the physical education department at Calhoun County High School in Grantsville, West Virginia, He is a member of the West Virginia Sportswriters Hall of Fame and the Coach Of the Year Award in the Little Kanawha Conference is named after him. He died of a heart attack on October 26, 1967.
