= West Union Downtown Historic District =

Historic district in West Virginia, United States

- U.S. National Register of Historic Places
- U.S. Historic district
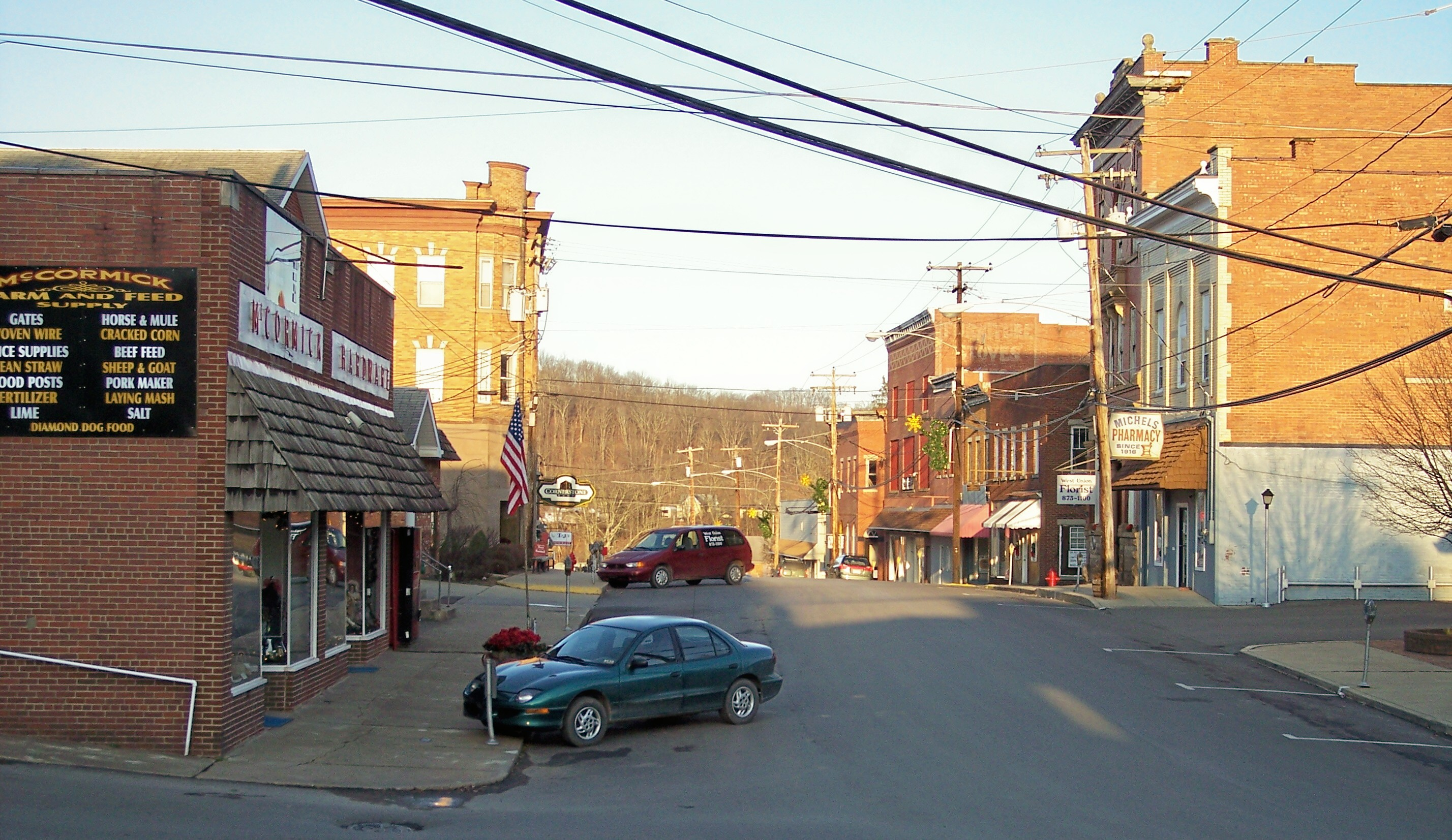
- West Union Downtown Historic District, December 2006

- Location within West Virginia Location within the United States
- Location: Roughly bounded by B&O RR, Court St, and Cottage St., West Union, West Virginia
- Coordinates: 39°17′41″N 80°46′31″W
- Area: 20.1 acres (8.1 ha)
- Built: 1903
- Architect: multiple
- Architectural style: Italianate, Queen Anne, et al.
- NRHP reference No.: 03000458
- Added to NRHP: May 22, 2003

West Union Downtown Historic District is a national historic district located at West Union, Doddridge County, West Virginia. It encompasses 27 contributing buildings that include the commercial and civic core of the town, and surrounding residential buildings. The district includes a number of buildings representative of popular architectural styles from the late-19th century and early-20th century including Romanesque Revival, Neoclassical, and Queen Anne. Notable buildings include the Doddridge County Courthouse (1903) and Jail (1937, now Doddridge County Museum), Scott W. Stuart House (c. 1905), Silas P. Smith House (c. 1903), Town Hall (1893), Droppleman Residence (c. 1917), Michel's Pharmacy (1925). Empire Oil Building (c. 1900), and Myles Manufacturing Co., Inc. (c. 1915). Also located in the district is the separately listed Silas P. Smith Opera House.

It was listed on the National Register of Historic Places in 2003.
