= Gamsjager–Wysong Farm =

Historic house in West Virginia, United States

- U.S. National Register of Historic Places
- Location within West Virginia Location within the United States
- Location: CR 66, St. Clara, West Virginia
- Coordinates: 39°7′28″N 80°41′33″W
- Area: 1.2 acres (0.49 ha)
- Built: 1906
- Architect: Gamsjager, John; Hinter, Frank
- Architectural style: German-style farmhouse
- NRHP reference No.: 86002181
- Added to NRHP: September 4, 1986

Gamsjager–Wysong Farm, also known as the Old Gamsjager Place, is a historic farmhouse located at St. Clara, Doddridge County, West Virginia. It was built in 1906, and is a two-story, rectangular German-style farmhouse with a two-story rear wing. It has a steeply pitched roof and sits on a sandstone foundation. Also on the property is a cellar house and 19th-century German bank barn.

It was listed on the National Register of Historic Places in 1986.
