= 1964 United States presidential election in West Virginia =

- November 3, 1964
- Turnout: 75.04% (of registered voters)

Nominee	Lyndon B. Johnson	Barry Goldwater
Party	Democratic	Republican
Home state	Texas	Arizona
Running mate	Hubert Humphrey	William E. Miller
Electoral vote	7	0
Popular vote	538,087	253,953
Percentage	67.94%	32.06%
County results
Johnson
50–60%
60–70%
70–80%
80–90%
Goldwater
50–60%
60–70%
President before election
Lyndon B. Johnson
Democratic
Elected President
Lyndon B. Johnson
Democratic

The 1964 United States presidential election in West Virginia took place on November 3, 1964, as part of the 1964 United States presidential election. West Virginia voters chose seven representatives, or electors, to the Electoral College, who voted for president and vice president.

West Virginia was won by incumbent President Lyndon B. Johnson (D–Texas), with 67.94 percent of the popular vote, against Senator Barry Goldwater (R–Arizona), with 32.06 percent of the popular vote.

In a state where Goldwater was widely perceived as an extremist and excessively allied with the Deep South, and where Johnson's campaign's presentation of his Republican opponent as a warmonger who would provoke nuclear war had particular resonance in an isolationist Appalachian population, the incumbent President's 67.94 percent vote share and 538,087-vote total are the highest percentage and vote count ever received by a Democratic presidential candidate in the state's history. It is also the most votes received by any candidate in West Virginia until Donald Trump surpassed this total in 2020. West Virginia would be easily Johnson's strongest antebellum slave state and his sixth-best overall behind Rhode Island, Hawaii, Massachusetts, Maine and New York, voting overall 13.29 percentage points more Democratic than the nation at-large even in a huge landslide.

As of the 2024 presidential election, this is the only election since the Civil War in which a Democratic presidential candidate won Preston County and Upshur County. It is also the last occasion when Berkeley County, Wood County, and Doddridge County backed a Democrat for President.

This also remains the last time that West Virginia and neighboring Virginia would simultaneously vote Democratic at the presidential level.

== Results ==
1964 United States presidential election in West Virginia
Party	Candidate	Votes	%
Democratic	Lyndon B. Johnson (incumbent)	538,087	67.94%
Republican	Barry Goldwater	253,953	32.06%
Total votes		792,040	100.00%

=== Results by county ===
County	Lyndon B. Johnson Democratic		Barry Goldwater Republican		Margin		Total votes cast
County	#	%	#	%	#	%	Total votes cast
Barbour	4,758	65.26%	2,533	34.74%	2,225	30.52%	7,291
Berkeley	8,628	61.26%	5,457	38.74%	3,171	22.52%	14,085
Boone	8,609	77.73%	2,467	22.27%	6,142	55.46%	11,076
Braxton	4,787	71.94%	1,867	28.06%	2,920	43.88%	6,654
Brooke	9,834	74.51%	3,364	25.49%	6,470	49.02%	13,198
Cabell	28,437	62.64%	16,957	37.36%	11,480	25.28%	45,394
Calhoun	2,626	67.32%	1,275	32.68%	1,351	34.64%	3,901
Clay	3,182	69.96%	1,366	30.04%	1,816	39.92%	4,548
Doddridge	1,587	50.09%	1,581	49.91%	6	0.18%	3,168
Fayette	19,990	83.15%	4,051	16.85%	15,939	66.30%	24,041
Gilmer	2,832	71.73%	1,116	28.27%	1,716	43.46%	3,948
Grant	1,494	37.75%	2,464	62.25%	−970	−24.50%	3,958
Greenbrier	10,112	68.97%	4,549	31.03%	5,563	37.94%	14,661
Hampshire	3,381	69.65%	1,473	30.35%	1,908	39.30%	4,854
Hancock	14,001	73.65%	5,009	26.35%	8,992	47.30%	19,010
Hardy	2,996	69.61%	1,308	30.39%	1,688	39.22%	4,304
Harrison	25,683	72.00%	9,986	28.00%	15,697	44.00%	35,669
Jackson	5,022	53.53%	4,359	46.47%	663	7.06%	9,381
Jefferson	4,892	72.02%	1,901	27.98%	2,991	44.04%	6,793
Kanawha	70,511	64.75%	38,383	35.25%	32,128	29.50%	108,894
Lewis	5,248	63.79%	2,979	36.21%	2,269	27.58%	8,227
Lincoln	5,852	63.01%	3,436	36.99%	2,416	26.02%	9,288
Logan	16,999	81.82%	3,776	18.18%	13,223	63.64%	20,775
Marion	22,047	74.10%	7,707	25.90%	14,340	48.20%	29,754
Marshall	11,757	65.56%	6,175	34.44%	5,582	31.12%	17,932
Mason	6,511	59.31%	4,467	40.69%	2,044	18.62%	10,978
McDowell	18,046	83.05%	3,684	16.95%	14,362	66.10%	21,730
Mercer	18,298	67.26%	8,905	32.74%	9,393	34.52%	27,203
Mineral	6,344	62.53%	3,801	37.47%	2,543	25.06%	10,145
Mingo	12,266	79.55%	3,154	20.45%	9,112	59.10%	15,420
Monongalia	17,358	72.84%	6,473	27.16%	10,885	45.68%	23,831
Monroe	3,367	58.54%	2,385	41.46%	982	17.08%	5,752
Morgan	1,820	49.38%	1,866	50.62%	−46	−1.24%	3,686
Nicholas	6,878	72.35%	2,628	27.65%	4,250	44.70%	9,506
Ohio	21,178	63.82%	12,006	36.18%	9,172	27.64%	33,184
Pendleton	2,498	65.84%	1,296	34.16%	1,202	31.68%	3,794
Pleasants	2,287	63.07%	1,339	36.93%	948	26.14%	3,626
Pocahontas	3,317	65.91%	1,716	34.09%	1,601	31.82%	5,033
Preston	6,264	60.94%	4,015	39.06%	2,249	21.88%	10,279
Putnam	6,910	62.39%	4,165	37.61%	2,745	24.78%	11,075
Raleigh	23,606	77.25%	6,952	22.75%	16,654	54.50%	30,558
Randolph	8,012	72.86%	2,984	27.14%	5,028	45.72%	10,996
Ritchie	2,244	45.23%	2,717	54.77%	−473	−9.54%	4,961
Roane	3,820	52.54%	3,451	47.46%	369	5.08%	7,271
Summers	5,037	71.97%	1,962	28.03%	3,075	43.94%	6,999
Taylor	4,442	65.96%	2,292	34.04%	2,150	31.92%	6,734
Tucker	2,664	66.97%	1,314	33.03%	1,350	33.94%	3,978
Tyler	2,275	47.43%	2,522	52.57%	−247	−5.14%	4,797
Upshur	3,774	51.14%	3,606	48.86%	168	2.28%	7,380
Wayne	11,578	68.44%	5,340	31.56%	6,238	36.88%	16,918
Webster	3,755	80.05%	936	19.95%	2,819	60.10%	4,691
Wetzel	6,239	65.99%	3,215	34.01%	3,024	31.98%	9,454
Wirt	1,286	58.86%	899	41.14%	387	17.72%	2,185
Wood	21,560	59.06%	14,947	40.94%	6,613	18.12%	36,507
Wyoming	9,188	73.12%	3,377	26.88%	5,811	46.24%	12,565
Totals	538,087	67.94%	253,953	32.06%	284,134	35.88%	

==== Counties that flipped from Republican to Democratic ====
- Barbour
- Berkeley
- Cabell
- Doddridge
- Jackson
- Kanawha
- Lewis
- Mason
- Mineral
- Monroe
- Pleasants
- Preston
- Putnam
- Roane
- Taylor
- Upshur
- Wetzel
- Wirt
- Wood
