= Edgar C. Wilson =

American politician

Member of the U.S. House of Representatives from Virginia's 21st district
- In office March 4, 1833 – March 3, 1835
- Preceded by: Lewis Maxwell
- Succeeded by: William S. Morgan

Personal details
- Born: Edgar Campbell Wilson; October 18, 1800 Morgantown, Virginia, U.S.
- Died: April 24, 1860 (aged 59) Morgantown, Virginia, U.S.
- Resting place: Oak Grove Cemetery; Morgantown, Virginia, U.S.
- Party: Anti-Jacksonian Party
- Children: Eugene McLanahan Wilson
- Parent: Thomas Wilson (father)
- Profession: lawyer; politician

Edgar Campbell Wilson (October 18, 1800 – April 24, 1860) was a U.S. representative from Virginia, son of Thomas Wilson and father of Eugene McLanahan Wilson.

== Early life ==
Edgar C. Wilson was born in Morgantown, Virginia (now West Virginia). Wilson completed preparatory studies and studied law.

== Career ==
He was admitted to the bar June 24, 1832, and commenced practice in Morgantown.

Wilson was elected as an Anti-Jacksonian to the Twenty-third Congress (March 4, 1833 – March 3, 1835). After he was unsuccessful in his reelection bid in 1834 to the Twenty-fourth Congress, he resumed the practice of law in Morgantown. He was appointed prosecuting attorney in the circuit court of Marion County in 1842.

== Death ==
He died in Morgantown on April 24, 1860. He was interred in Oak Grove Cemetery in Morgantown.

== Sources ==
- United States Congress. "Edgar C. Wilson (id: W000574)". Biographical Directory of the United States Congress.

U.S. House of Representatives
Preceded by Lewis Maxwell	Member of the U.S. House of Representatives from Virginia's 21st congressional district 1833–1835	Succeeded by William S. Morgan
