= Doddridge County Schools =

School district in West Virginia, United States

Doddridge County Schools is the operating school district within Doddridge County, West Virginia. It is governed by the Doddridge County Board of Education.

== Schools ==
=== High schools ===
- Doddridge County High School

=== Middle schools ===
- Doddridge County Middle School

=== Elementary schools ===
- Doddridge County Elementary School
