= Maxwell House (disambiguation) =

Maxwell House is an American brand of coffee.

Maxwell House may also refer to:

- Maxwell House (Stedman, North Carolina), a US historic home listed on the National Register of Historic Places
- Maxwell House Hotel, Nashville, Tennessee, US

== See also ==
- Maxwell House Haggadah, a haggadah produced by the Maxwell House Company
- Maxwell House Show Boat, US radio show sponsored by the coffee brand
- Maxwell House, part of The Printworks venue, Manchester, England
- House of Maxwell, a 3-part BBC miniseries about media mogul Robert Maxwell
