= William S. Morgan =

American politician

U.S. Representative from Virginia
- In office March 4, 1835 – March 4, 1839

William Stephen Morgan (September 7, 1801 – September 3, 1878) was a U.S. representative from Virginia.

== Early and family life ==
Born in Monongalia County, Virginia (now West Virginia), Morgan received a private education suitable for his class. He was a descendant of the first white settler of western Virginia, Morgan Morgan; his grandfather was Morgan Morgan's son David Morgan.

He married the former Mary Lanham, and they would have at least five sons (four of whom fought with the Confederate States Army, the youngest being too young) and two daughters.

== Career ==
He farmed at White Day, Virginia. Morgan was an unsuccessful candidate for election in 1832 to the Twenty-third Congress.

Morgan was elected as a Jacksonian to the Twenty-fourth Congress and reelected as a Democrat to the Twenty-fifth Congress (March 4, 1835 – March 4, 1839). He served as chairman of the Committee on Revolutionary Pensions (Twenty-fifth Congress). He declined to be a candidate for renomination in 1838 but was employed as a clerk in the House of Representatives in 1840.Transferred as a clerk to the legislature of Virginia.

He served as member of the state house of delegates 1841–1844, during which time he was responsible for the creation of Marion County. He was appointed a clerk in the Treasury Department and served from August 3, 1845, until June 30, 1861. He was employed in the Smithsonian Institution in 1861–1863.

He moved to Rivesville, West Virginia.

== American Civil War ==
Many in western Virginia who opposed secession met at the Wheeling Conventions in 1861, which led to the creation of West Virginia.

However, this Morgan's four sons enlisted in the Confederate States Army, most already having drilled with the Marion Guards. Stephen A. Morgan fought with the 31st Virginia Infantry as well as served in the Virginia House of Delegates and was captured near the war's end. His brothers Charles R. Morgan, William L. Morgan, and Edward L. Morgan also fought for the Confederacy. Their uncle (this Morgan's brother) George P. Morgan (1820–1861) enlisted in the Confederate States Army, was captured at a skirmish near Camp Bartow in October 1861, and died at Camp Chase, the same Ohio prisoner of war camp which Stephen A. Morgan would survive years later.

== Death and legacy ==
William S. Morgan died September 3, 1878, while on a visit to Washington, D.C., and was interred in the Congressional Cemetery.

== Sources ==
- United States Congress. "William S. Morgan (id: M000960)". Biographical Directory of the United States Congress.

U.S. House of Representatives
Preceded by Edgar C. Wilson	Member of the U.S. House of Representatives from Virginia's 21st congressional district 1835–1839	Succeeded by Lewis Steenrod
