= Ephraim Bee =

American politician

Ephraim Bee (December 26, 1802 – October 23, 1888) was an American pioneer, blacksmith, and inn-keeper of Doddridge County, West Virginia, which he represented in the West Virginia House of Delegates in 1863 and 1866–1867.

== Biography ==
Bee was born to Asa and Rhoda (Cox) Bee in Salem, New Jersey. He moved with his parents around 1820 to western Virginia, settling in what later became Lewisport. There he built his own cabin and blacksmith shop. He later operated a prosperous inn which was christened the "Beehive Inn". Bee was married twice: first to Catherine Davis (1803–1852) in 1823, and second to Mary Welch (1823–1905). Between them he had 17 children who survived infancy.

Bee is credited as the creator and founder (1845) of "the Celestial Order" of E Clampus Vitus, a facetious parody of more serious fraternal organizations. ECV was created for humor, entertainment and social purposes. A modern revival in 1931 is dedicated to the preservation of western U.S. history across eleven states.

When West Virginia became a state in 1863, Bee represented Doddridge County in the first state legislature. In 1864–65 he served as the U.S. Postmaster for West Union. He was elected to two later terms in the House of Delegates before his retirement.

In his later years Bee was also a successful land speculator, acquiring around 40,000 acres (160 km²) in West Virginia. An item in the West Union Record in 1885 stated that "Honorable Ephraim Bee, one of the first settlers in this area & now an old & respected citizen of this county is dangerously ill at his home on Cabin Run." He died on October 23, 1888, age 86, and was buried in Cabin Run Cemetery, near West Union, West Virginia.

== Family ==
Bee's grandson, Clair Bee (1896–1983), was a college basketball coach for Long Island University and, ultimately, a member of the Basketball Hall of Fame.
