= Haymond Maxwell =

American judge (1879–1958)

Haymond Maxwell (October 24, 1879 Clarksburg, West Virginia – December 19, 1958 Clarksburg, West Virginia) was an American lawyer, politician, judge, and justice of the Supreme Court of Appeals of West Virginia.

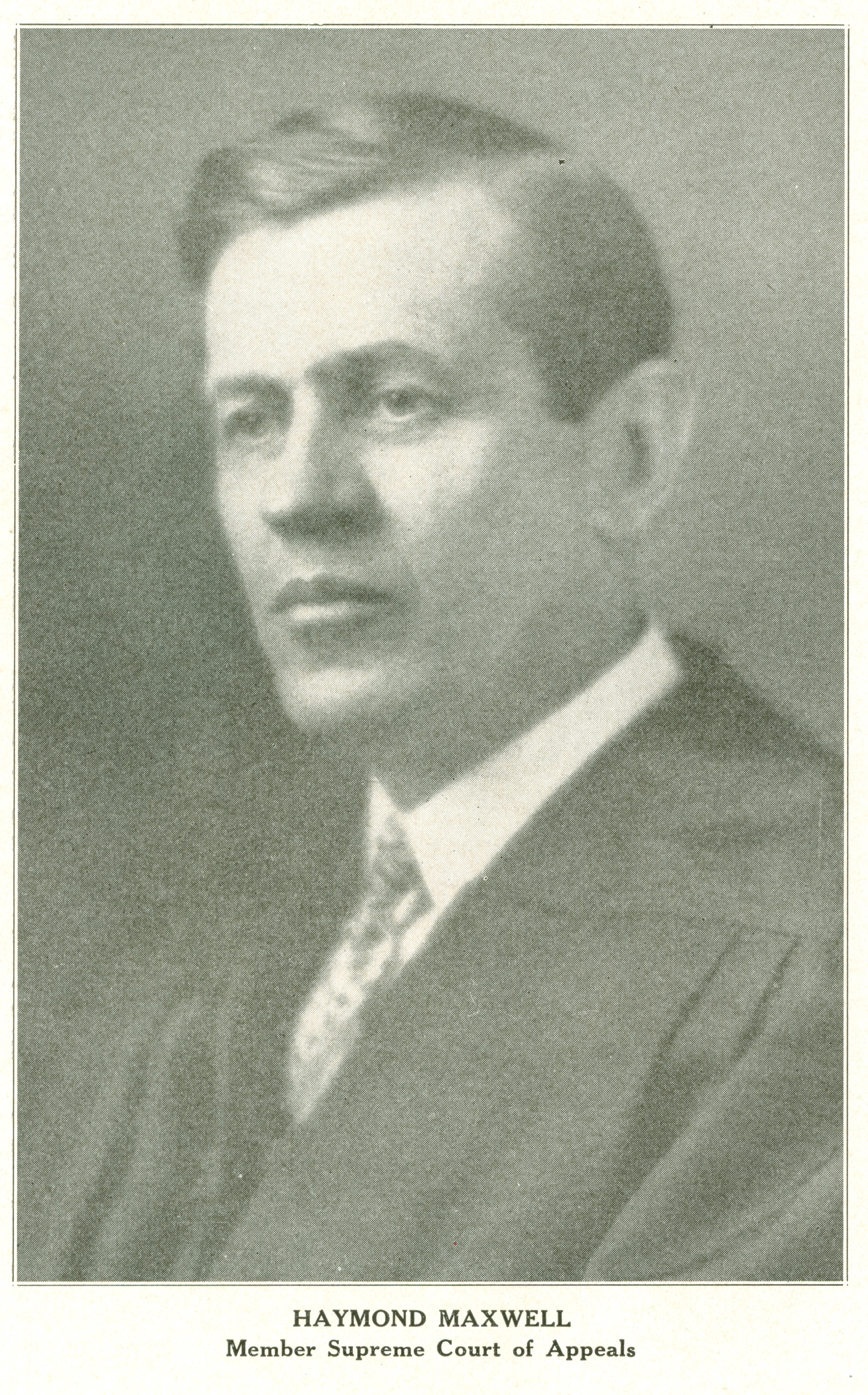
Haymond Maxwell (1879-1958)

== Early life and career ==
Maxwell was the son of Edwin Maxwell, a prominent West Virginia judge and politician, and Loretta Shuttleworth. Maxwell was educated in the public schools and then at West Virginia University, graduating in 1900. He received a law degree there in 1901. He opened a practice in Clarksburg, and was elected to the West Virginia House of Delegates in 1905 as a Republican. In May 1909 he was appointed as judge of the criminal court in Harrison County, serving until 1912. As of December 1909 he was, at the age of 30, the youngest judge in the state. In 1912 and 1920 he was elected to eight-year terms as Circuit Court judge. He resigned in 1925 to return to private practice. He was appointed to the West Virginia Supreme Court of Appeals on August 21, 1928, and elected on the Republican ticket to a full term in November of that year, serving until December 31, 1940. He was unsuccessful in seeking re-election in 1940 and 1944.

== Publisher ==
In 1938 Maxwell published The Story of Sycamore, a local history of the settlements along Sycamore Creek near Clarksburg.

== Personal life ==
Maxwell married his distant cousin Carrie Virginia Maxwell in 1905; they had five children. His son Porter Wilson Maxwell commanded a squadron of Navy divebombers during World War II; he was killed in action on July 24, 1945.
