= Lathrop Russell Charter House =

Historic house in West Virginia, United States

- U.S. National Register of Historic Places
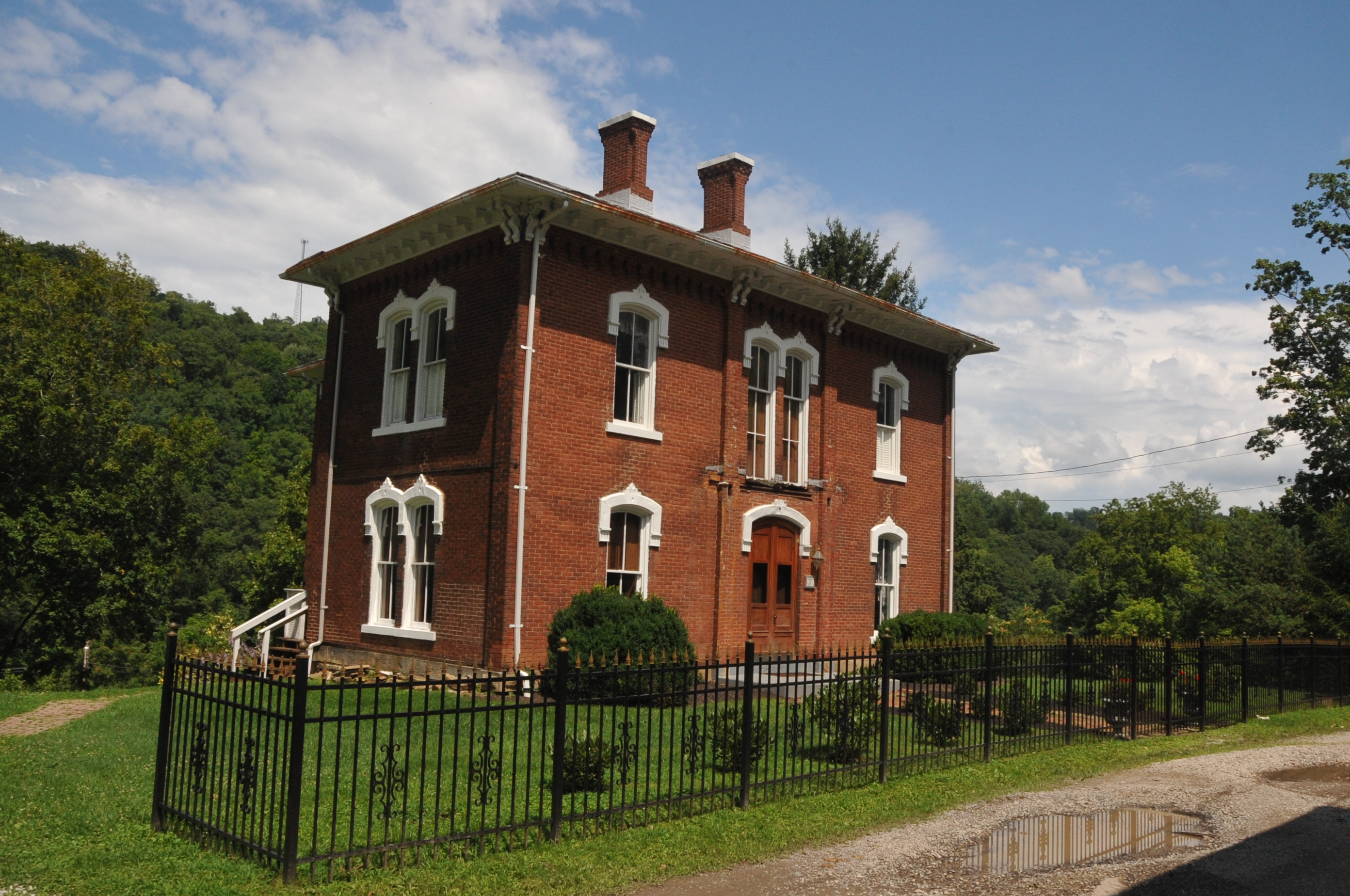
- Lathrop Russell Charter House, January 2007

- Location within West Virginia Location within the United States
- Location: 109 High St., West Union, West Virginia
- Coordinates: 39°17′39″N 80°46′23″W
- Area: 1 acre (0.40 ha)
- Built: 1877
- Architectural style: Italianate
- NRHP reference No.: 93000219
- Added to NRHP: March 25, 1993

The Lathrop Russell Charter House is a historic home located at West Union, Doddridge County, West Virginia, U.S.A. It was built in 1877, and is a two-story, T-shaped frame dwelling, with a low-pitched hipped roof with bracketed eaves. It features tall crowned windows and a two-story side porch. Also on the property is a contributing guest house.

It was listed on the National Register of Historic Places in 1993.

== Description ==
The L.R. Charter House, located at the end of High Street in West Union, is an intact and representative example of the Italianate style. The two-story house, constructed in 1877, remains substantially unaltered from its original appearance when the Charter family occupied the house. The building's most significant characteristics are its size; tall, crowned windows; low-pitched, hipped roof with broad, bracketed eaves; and two-story side porch. The Charter house has undergone few alterations and it retains the characteristics that are most illustrative of the Italianate style.

The house sits on a coursed, rough stone foundation and under its original metal roof. It has a T-shaped plan and an intersecting hipped roof. The front main block of the house is a symmetrical two-story box with three bays across both levels of the front and one bay of paired windows on the side. The main entrance faces south towards High Street. The panelled double doors are located in the center of the facade. The doors stand behind the original wooden storm doors in a segmental-arched frame. )4 molded, wooden crown tops the opening. The house's porch was recently removed because of its rotted condition but photographs taken during the 1970s reveal a typical Italianate porch located in front of the center bay. Arched openings, broad fluted supports, and a bracketed cornice adorned the porch. The porch supported a balcony above with a closed railing and finials on its corners. Tall, paired windows stand directly over the entrance and open onto the balcony. These windows and all other windows on the main block of the house stand in segmental arched openings and display decorative metal crowns over the top.

Other decorative features that embellish the house are the brick quoins that define each corner, the corbelled brick string course under the roofline, and the paired center chimneys. Another characteristic typical of Italianate houses is the bracketed roofline. The brackets across the eaves are small, simple, and decorative. On the corners of the house and over the brick pilasters flanking the entrance bay are larger, more elaborate scroll brackets that are only decorative but appear to be holding the broad eaves. The low-pitched hipped roof with its overhanging eaves and pronounced brackets, recalls the style's Italian Renaissance roots from which it is derived. The building's three-story rear wing was probably constructed at the same time or shortly after the front section. It was built more simply than the front section but still displays the same Italianate detail. The lindows and doors stand in segmental arched openings and have exterior shutters.
