= New Milton, West Virginia =

- Unincorporated community
- Location within the state of West Virginia New; Milton (the United States)
- Coordinates: 39°13′48″N 80°40′57″W
- Country: United States
- State: West Virginia
- County: Doddridge
- Time zone: UTC-5 (Eastern (EST))
  - Summer (DST): UTC-4 (EDT)
- ZIP codes: 26411

New Milton is an unincorporated community in central Doddridge County, West Virginia, United States. The community is located along Meathouse Fork, southeast of the town of West Union, the county seat of Doddridge County. Its elevation is 833 feet (254 m). It had a post office with the ZIP code 26411 but was closed several years ago.
