= Maxwell, Ontario =

Maxwell, Ontario can refer to:

- Maxwell, Grey County, Ontario
- Maxwell, Hastings County, Ontario
