= Maxwell House (Stedman, North Carolina) =

Historic house in North Carolina, United States

- U.S. National Register of Historic Places
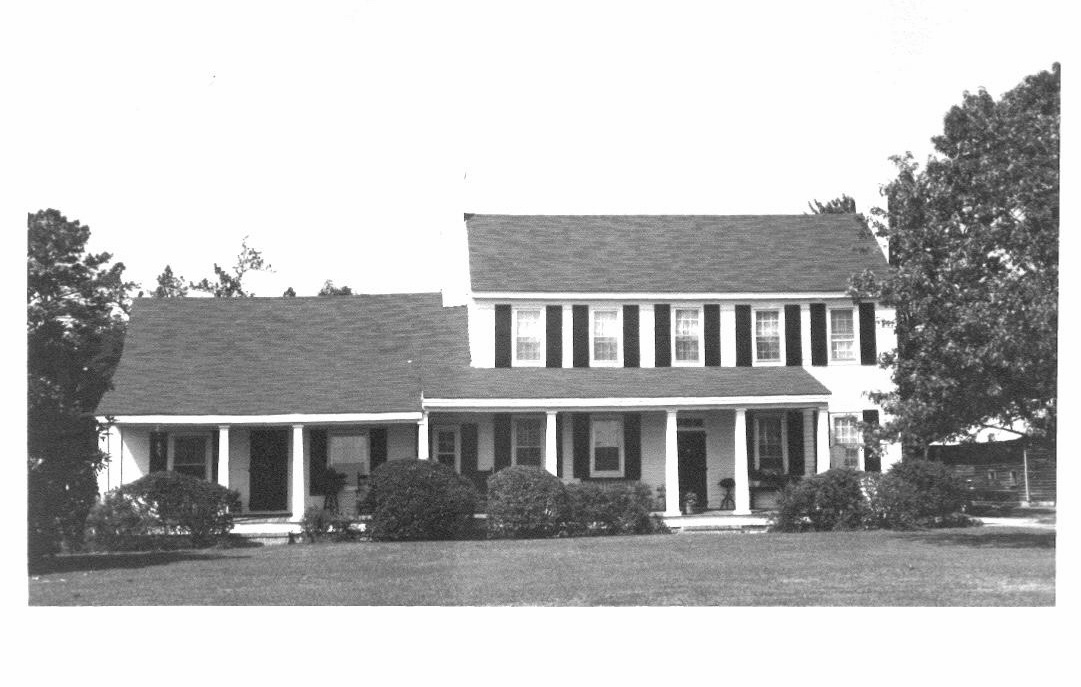

- Location within North Carolina Location within the United States
- Location: Off NC 24, near Stedman, North Carolina
- Coordinates: 35°1′18″N 78°43′23″W
- Area: 5 acres (2.0 ha)
- Built: c. 1790–1815, c. 1845
- Architectural style: Mixed (more Than 2 Styles From Different Periods)
- NRHP reference No.: 85000380
- Added to NRHP: February 28, 1985

Maxwell House is a historic home located near Stedman, Cumberland County, North Carolina. It consists of two sections: a coastal cottage form log section dated to about 1790–1815 and a two-story, five-bay, transitional Federal / Greek Revival style section dated to about 1845. Also on the property are the contributing dairy, a shed, cinder block smokehouse, a tin roof stable, and a diminutive slave kitchen.

It was listed on the National Register of Historic Places in 1985.
