= Maxwell Township =

Maxwell Township may refer to the following townships in the United States:

- Maxwell Township, Sangamon County, Illinois
- Maxwell Township, Lac qui Parle County, Minnesota
