= W. Scott Stuart House =

Historic house in West Virginia, United States

- U.S. National Register of Historic Places
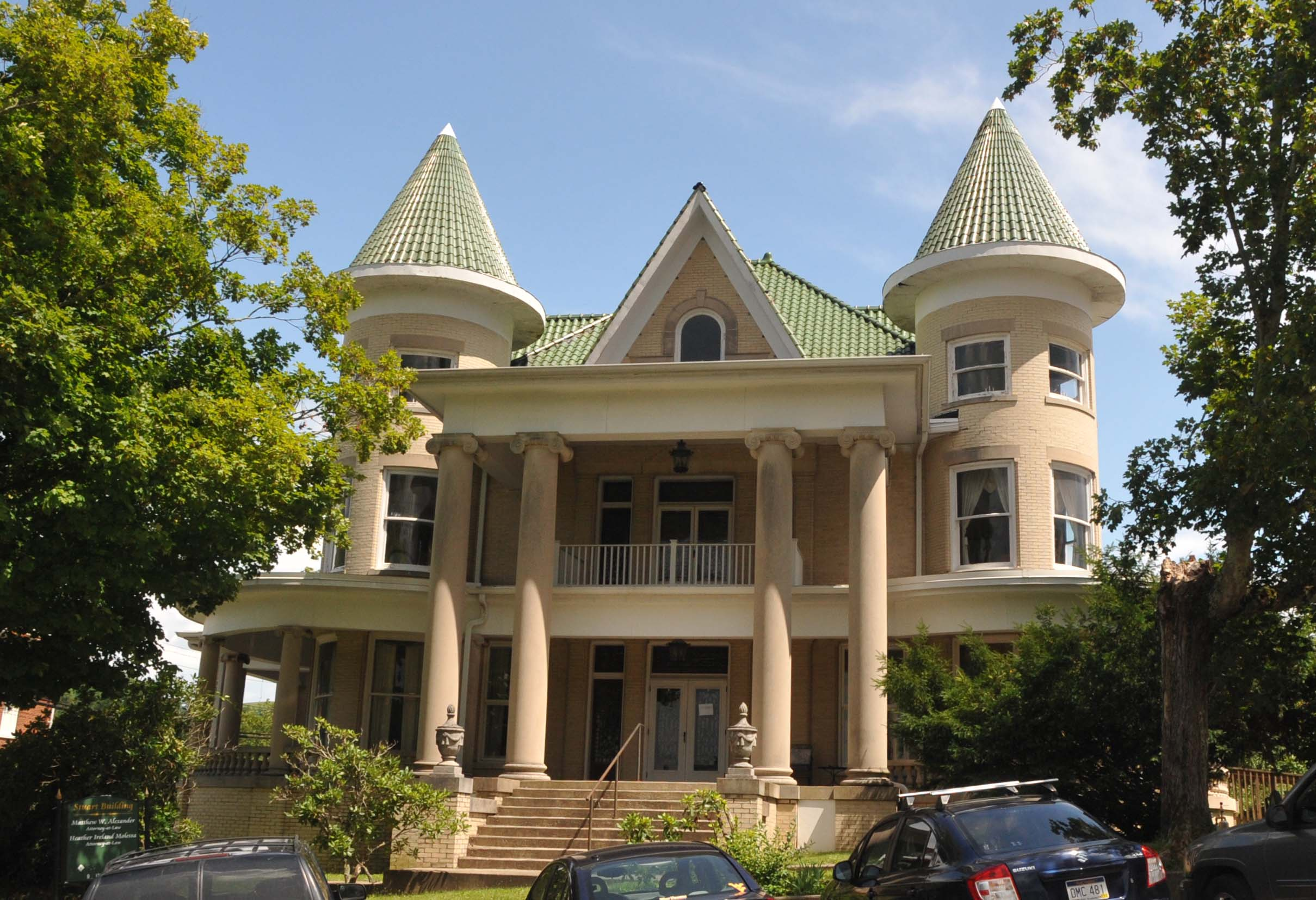

- Location within West Virginia Location within the United States
- Location: 104 Chancery St., West Union, West Virginia
- Coordinates: 39°17′38″N 80°46′28″W
- Area: less than one acre
- Built: 1905
- Architectural style: Late 19th And Early 20th Century American Movements
- NRHP reference No.: 93000220
- Added to NRHP: March 25, 1993

The W. Scott Stuart House is a historic home located at West Union, Doddridge County, West Virginia. It was built about 1905, and is a three-story, frame dwelling, with a two-story front portico with Ionic order columns, wrap-around porch, and an opulent interior in a transitional Queen Anne style. It features circular twin towers located on each front corner with tile conical roofs.

It was listed on the National Register of Historic Places in 1993.
