= Virginia's 21st congressional district =

1803–1843 US congressional district

Coordinates: 39°40′N 80°40′W

- Obsolete district
- Created: 1803
- Eliminated: 1843
- Years active: 1803–1843

Virginia's 21st congressional district is an obsolete congressional district. It was eliminated in 1843 after the 1840 U.S. census. Its last congressman was Lewis Steenrod.

== List of members representing the district ==
Representative	Party	Term	Cong ress	Electoral history
District established March 4, 1803
Thomas M. Randolph Jr. (Edge Hill)	Democratic-Republican	March 4, 1803 – March 3, 1807	8th 9th	Elected in 1803. Re-elected in 1805. Retired.
Wilson C. Nicholas (Charlottesville)	Democratic-Republican	March 4, 1807 – November 27, 1809	10th 11th	Elected in 1807. Re-elected in 1809. Resigned.
Vacant		November 28, 1809 – January 16, 1810	11th	
David S. Garland (Clifford)	Democratic-Republican	January 17, 1810 – March 3, 1811	11th	Elected to finish Nicholas's term. Retired.
Hugh Nelson (Milton)	Democratic-Republican	March 4, 1811 – March 3, 1813	12th	Elected in 1811. Redistricted to the 22nd district.
Thomas Newton Jr. (Norfolk)	Democratic-Republican	March 4, 1813 – March 3, 1823	13th 14th 15th 16th 17th	Redistricted from the 20th district and re-elected in 1813. Re-elected in 1815. Re-elected in 1817. Re-elected in 1819. Re-elected in 1821. Redistricted to the 1st district.
William Smith (Lewisburg)	Democratic-Republican	March 4, 1823 – March 3, 1825	18th 19th	Redistricted from the 7th district and re-elected in 1823. Re-elected in 1825. Retired.
William Smith (Lewisburg)	Jacksonian	March 4, 1825 – March 3, 1827	18th 19th	Redistricted from the 7th district and re-elected in 1823. Re-elected in 1825. Retired.
Lewis Maxwell (Weston)	Anti-Jacksonian	March 4, 1827 – March 3, 1833	20th 21st 22nd	Elected in 1827. Re-elected in 1829. Re-elected in 1831. Retired.
Edgar C. Wilson (Morgantown)	Anti-Jacksonian	March 4, 1833 – March 3, 1835	23rd	Elected in 1833. Lost re-election.
William S. Morgan (White Day)	Jacksonian	March 4, 1835 – March 3, 1837	24th 25th	Elected in 1835. Re-elected in 1837. Retired.
William S. Morgan (White Day)	Democratic	March 4, 1837 – March 3, 1839	24th 25th	Elected in 1835. Re-elected in 1837. Retired.
Lewis Steenrod (Wheeling)	Democratic	March 4, 1839 – March 3, 1843	26th 27th	Elected in 1839. Re-elected in 1841. Redistricted to the 15th district.
District dissolved March 4, 1843
