= St. Clara, West Virginia =

- Unincorporated community
- Location within the state of West Virginia St. Clara (the United States)
- Coordinates: 39°7′19″N 80°41′14″W
- Country: United States
- State: West Virginia
- County: Doddridge
- Time zone: UTC-5 (Eastern (EST))
  - Summer (DST): UTC-4 (EDT)
- GNIS feature ID: 1555554U.S. Geological Survey Geographic Names Information System: St. Clara, West Virginia

St. Clara is an unincorporated community in central Doddridge County, West Virginia, United States. Its elevation is 850 feet (254 m).

Joseph H. Diss Debar founded the German-Swiss immigrant colony and named it after his first wife, Clara Levassor. Located at St. Clara is the Gamsjager-Wysong Farm, listed on the National Register of Historic Places in 1986.
