= West Union Residential Historic District =

Historic district in West Virginia, United States

- U.S. National Register of Historic Places
- U.S. Historic district
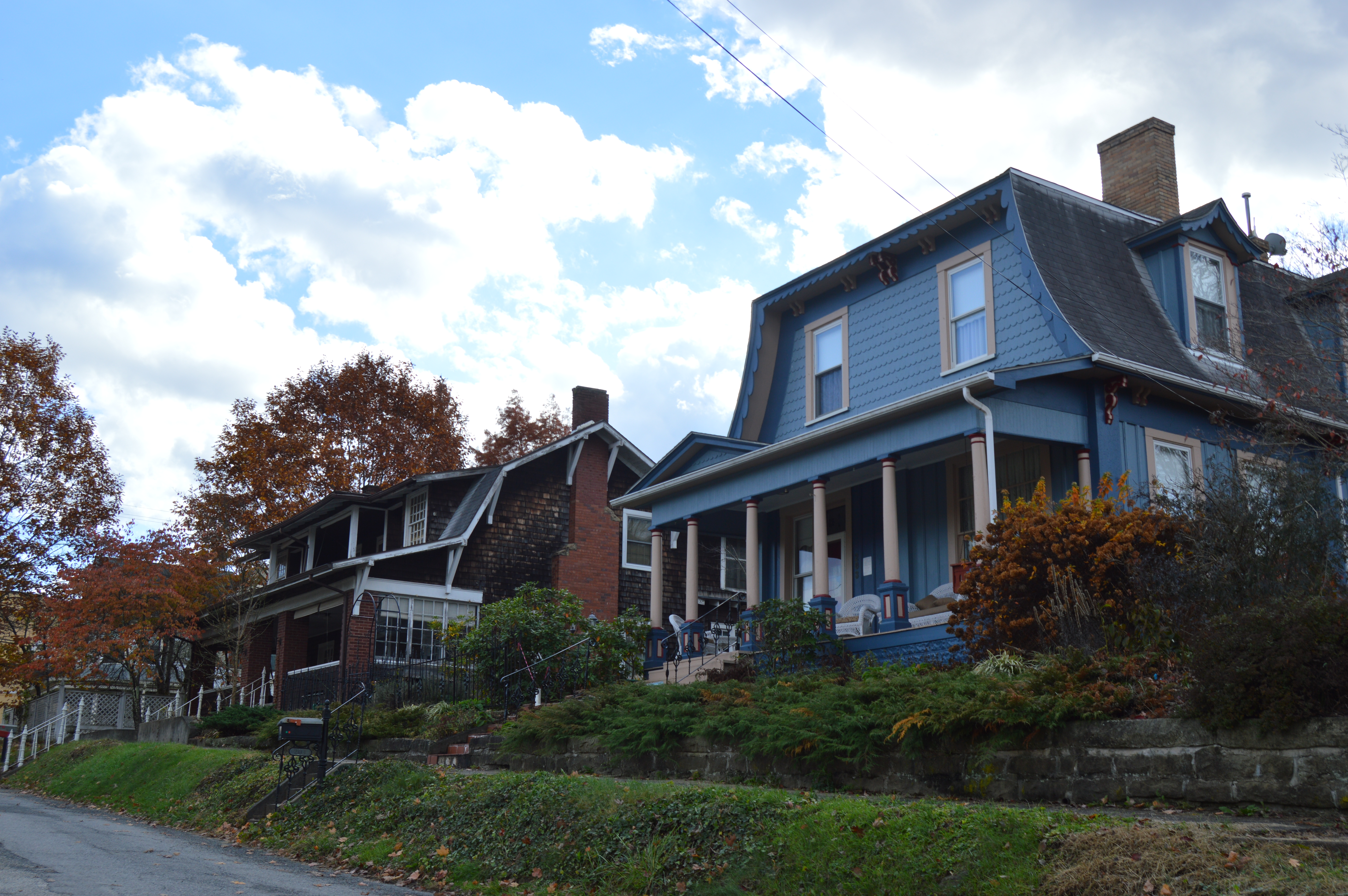
- Houses on Court Street

- Location within West Virginia Location within the United States
- Location: Roughly bounded by Court St., Stuart St., Wood St., and Garrison Ave., West Union, West Virginia
- Coordinates: 39°17′35″N 80°46′33″W
- Area: 36 acres (15 ha)
- Architect: multiple
- Architectural style: Colonial Revival, Queen Anne, et al.
- NRHP reference No.: 10001029
- Added to NRHP: December 14, 2010

West Union Residential Historic District is a national historic district located at West Union, Doddridge County, West Virginia. It encompasses 85 contributing residential buildings, built between about 1858 and 1940. They are representative of popular architectural styles from the late-19th century and early-20th century including Colonial Revival and Queen Anne. Notable non-residential buildings include the West Union Baptist Church, Emmanuel United Methodist Church, and Doddridge County High School.

It was listed on the National Register of Historic Places in 2010.
