= Doddridge County Courthouse =

- U.S. National Register of Historic Places
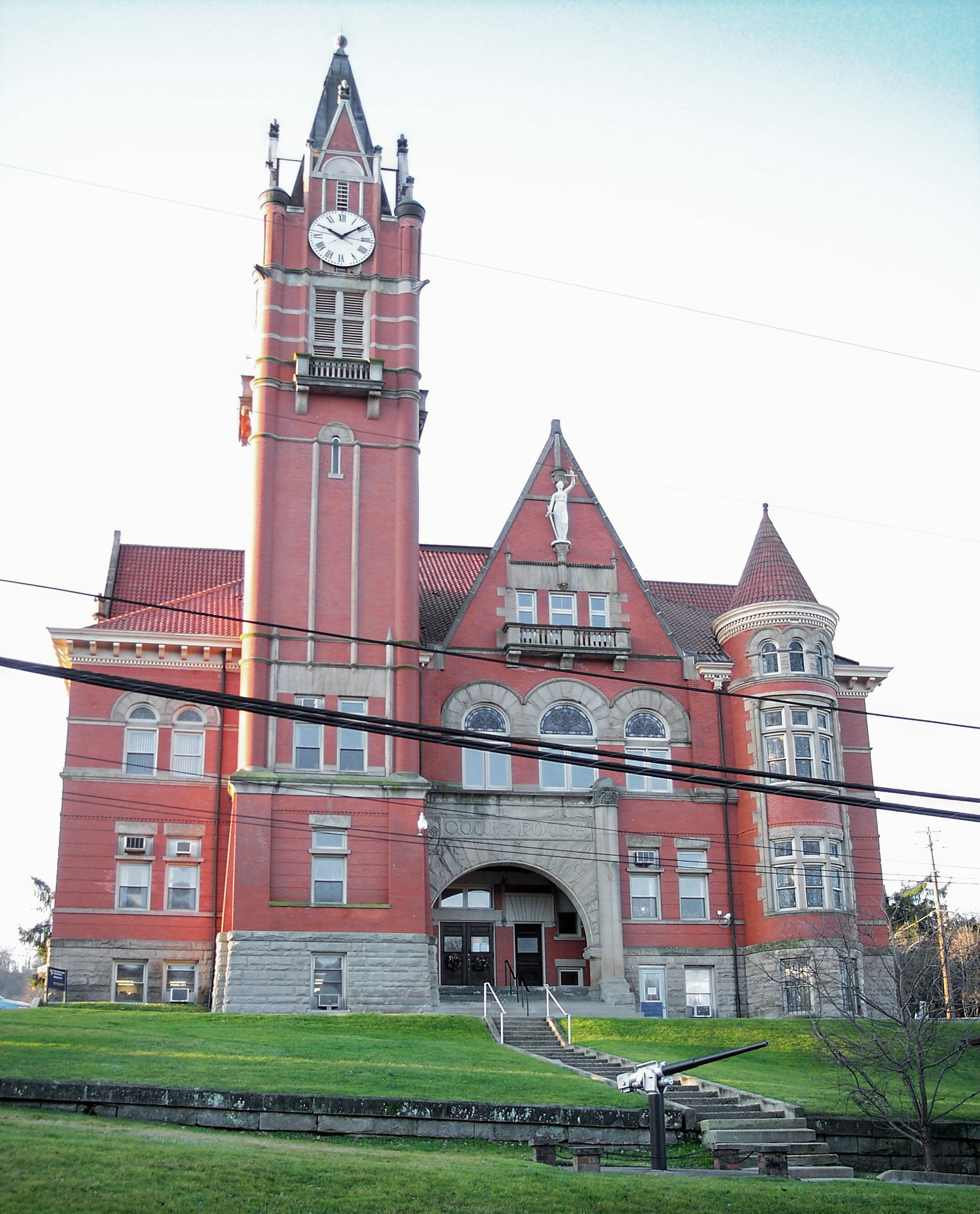

- Location within West Virginia Location within the United States
- Interactive map showing the location of Doddridge County Courthouse
- Location: Court Sq., West Union, West Virginia
- Coordinates: 39°17′39″N 80°46′28″W
- Built: 1899
- Architect: Fulton, J. Charles; Et al.
- Architectural style: Romanesque, Late Victorian Romanesque
- NRHP reference No.: 82004316
- Added to NRHP: March 18, 1982

The Doddridge County Courthouse in West Union, Doddridge County, West Virginia, USA, was designed in the Victorian Romanesque style by J. Charles Fulton, who also designed courthouses in Barbour County and Randolph County. Built in 1899 by contractor John B. Conn, the courthouse features stone carvings by James Grant. The courthouse replaced a previous courthouse that was destroyed by fire in 1898.
