= Lewis Maxwell =

American politician (1790–1862)

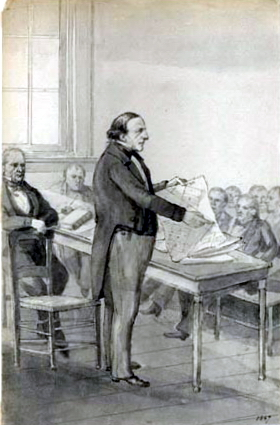
- Sketch of Lewis Maxwell by Joseph H. Diss Debar

Member of the U.S. House of Representatives from Virginia's 21st district
- In office March 4, 1827 – March 3, 1833
- Preceded by: William Smith
- Succeeded by: Edgar C. Wilson

Member of the Virginia House of Delegates
- In office 1821–1824

Personal details
- Born: April 17, 1790 Chester County, Pennsylvania, U.S.
- Died: February 13, 1862 (aged 71) West Union, Virginia, U.S.
- Resting place: Odd Fellows Cemetery
- Party: Anti-Jacksonian
- Other political affiliations: Adams
- Profession: Politician, lawyer

Lewis Maxwell (April 17, 1790 – February 13, 1862) was a U.S. representative from Virginia.

== Biography ==
Born in Chester County, Pennsylvania, Maxwell moved with his mother to Virginia about 1800. He completed a preparatory course. He studied law. He was admitted to the bar and commenced practice in Weston, Virginia (now West Virginia). He served as member of the State house of delegates in 1821–1824.

Maxwell was elected as an Adams candidate to the 20th U.S. Congress (1827-1829). He was reelected as an Anti-Jacksonian to the 21st and 22nd U.S. Congresses (1827–1833). He served as chairman of the Committee on Expenditures in the Department of War (Twenty-first Congress), Committee on Expenditures in the Department of the Navy (Twenty-second Congress). He was not a candidate for re-nomination in 1832. He resumed the practice of law and was also engaged as a surveyor and land patentee. He died in West Union, Virginia (now West Virginia), February 13, 1862. He was interred in Odd Fellows Cemetery.

== Sources ==
- United States Congress. "Lewis Maxwell (id: M000269)". Biographical Directory of the United States Congress.

U.S. House of Representatives
Preceded by William Smith	Member of the U.S. House of Representatives from Virginia's 21st congressional district 1827–1833	Succeeded by Edgar C. Wilson
