= Doddridge County, West Virginia =

County in West Virginia, United States

- County
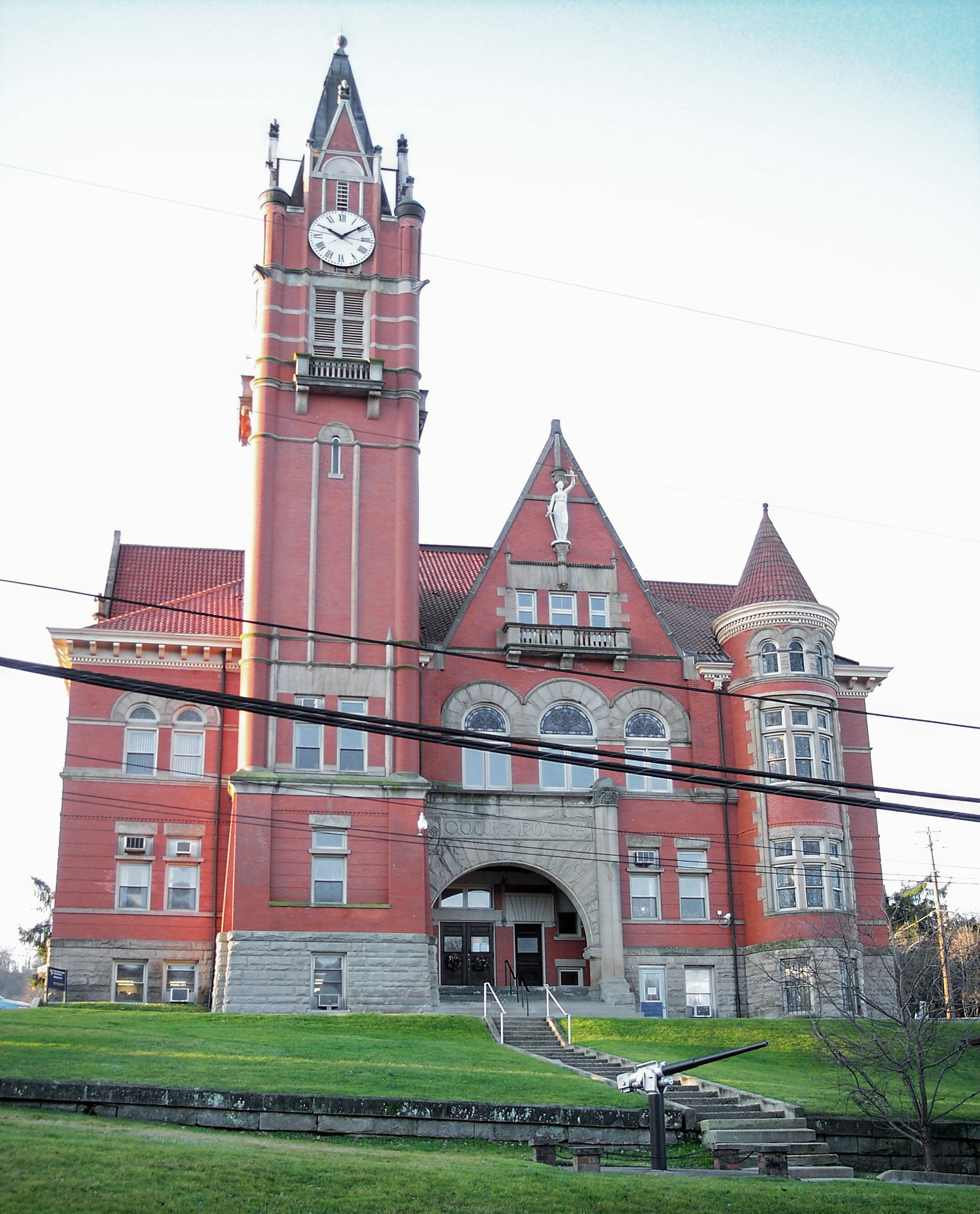
- The Doddridge County Courthouse (1899) in West Union

- Flag Seal

- Location within the U.S. state of West Virginia
- Coordinates: 39°16′N 80°42′W
- Country: United States
- State: West Virginia
- Founded: February 4, 1845
- Named for: Philip Doddridge
- Seat: West Union
- Largest town: West Union

Area
  - Total: 320 sq mi (830 km^{2})
  - Land: 320 sq mi (830 km^{2})
  - Water: 0.8 sq mi (2.1 km^{2}) 0.2%

Population (2020)
  - Total: 7,808
  - Estimate (2025): 7,634 ▼
  - Density: 24/sq mi (9.4/km^{2})
- Time zone: UTC−5 (Eastern)
  - Summer (DST): UTC−4 (EDT)
- Congressional district: 1st
- Website: www.doddridgecountywv.gov

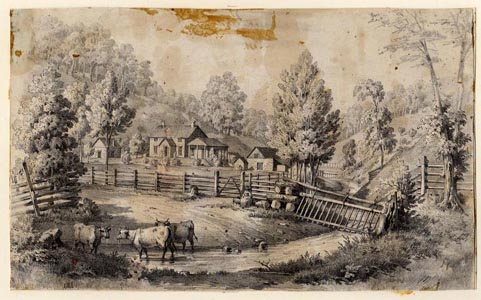
Debar House (built 1852), St. Clara Colony, Doddridge County, [West] Virginia

Doddridge County is a county in the U.S. state of West Virginia. As of the 2020 census, the population was 7,808. Its county seat is West Union.

Doddridge County is part of the Clarksburg, West Virginia, WV Micropolitan Statistical Area.

== History ==
=== First settlers ===
The area that became Doddridge County, Virginia – now West Virginia – was first settled in the late 1780s by James Caldwell, who owned 20,000 acres (81 km^{2}) of land that included present West Union. Caldwell sold this land to Nathan Davis Jr (1772–1866) and his brothers Joseph and William around 1807. They in turn sold 16,000 acres (65 km^{2}) to Lewis Maxwell (1790–1862), a Virginia Assembly delegate in the 1820s who later became a U.S. Congressman. In 1828 Ephraim Bee, Sr (1802–1888) and his wife Catherine established a log home on Meathouse Fork of Middle Island Creek, now part of West Union. They built an Inn across the "Creek" (really a river) at what was then called Lewisport (Congressman Maxwell's namesake), below a blockhouse on the Northwestern Turnpike. The "Beehive Inn" became a popular place for travelers and locals to meet, refresh themselves and re-provision. Bee operated the first local blacksmith shop; a farm, stables, tannery and horse-racing track soon followed.

According to Ephraim's father, A.A. Bee: "The first bridge across Middle Island Creek [at West Union] was of hewed logs with a center abutment of stones. In the great flood of 1835 it was washed away". In 1842, a contract was awarded to the well-known civil engineer Claudius Crozet to build a covered bridge at West Union, as part of a series of public works along the Turnpike. Ephraim Bee was later to become a district officer, magistrate, state legislator, hotelier, and postmaster. As blacksmith, he made all the bolts and bands for the West Union Covered Bridge, completed in 1843.

=== New county ===
Doddridge County was officially created in 1845 from parts of Harrison, Tyler, Ritchie, and Lewis Counties of what was then still Virginia. It was named for Philip Doddridge (1773–1832), the late statesman of western Virginia who was the leading voice for westerners during the Virginia Constitutional Convention of 1829–1830. When it was announced the new county would be formed, Ephraim Bee rallied to locate the county seat at Lewisport. But Nathan Davis Jr (who was Ephraim's wife's uncle), William Fitz Randolph, and others, won out in favor of West Union, across the river on the south side. There Ethelbert Bond (Nathan's son-in-law and William's wife's cousin) laid out the town lots in regular fashion on land formerly owned by Davis.

Progress of the Baltimore and Ohio Railroad, on its way from Clarksburg to Parkersburg, reached and bisected the county in 1856.

On the night of March 27, 1858, a fire devastated the town of West Union.

West Virginia became a state following the Wheeling Conventions of 1861, after the American Civil War had begun.

In 1863, West Virginia's counties were divided into civil townships, with the intention of encouraging local government. This proved impractical in the heavily rural state, and in 1872 the townships were converted into magisterial districts. Doddridge County was divided into six districts: Central, Grant, McClellan, New Milton, Southwest, and West Union. A seventh district, Greenbrier, was created from part of New Milton in 1885; and an eighth, Cove, was formed from part of Southwest District between 1890 and 1900. The historic magisterial districts were consolidated into four new districts between 1980 and 1990: Beech, Maple, Oak, and Pine.

Maxwell Ridge – named for the Congressman's family – is said to have a cave (Gatrell Cave) that was used by the Underground Railroad in the years leading up to the Civil War. Another nearby grotto, Jaco Cave, is said to have been used for the same purpose and is also featured in a movie from the 1970s called “No Drums, No Bugles” which features some locals as well as Martin Sheen, father of Charlie Sheen.

The county seat of West Union was incorporated on July 20, 1881.

=== Oil and gas boom ===
Doddridge County's oil and gas industry was an enormous boom to residents. The county's first oil pool, at Center Point, was discovered ("brought in" as it was then termed) and drilled in 1892. This was an extension of the technology and boom of the western Pennsylvania oil and gas fields into Tyler and Doddridge Counties. Many farm owners, and sons of farm owners, split their time between their farmwork and the petroleum operations. Almost every local farm benefited from this as free gas was piped to the farmhouses of many landowners. Gas was soon used for heating, lighting, and cooking, which replaced the wood stoves, kerosene and candles of previous generations. By 1906, the Ideal Glass Factory opened to take advantage of the abundant natural gas. It was followed by the Doddridge County Window Glass Company. The two plants employed about 300 people. In later years a garment factory opened, but closed in the mid-1990s.

A long-remembered flood devastated West Union in June 1950, destroying homes and businesses and killing more than 20 people throughout the county. (One casualty was the 107-year-old covered bridge.)

Today farming, timbering, oil and gas, and the business of county government and public education support the area, and many people commute to jobs in Salem, Clarksburg, and Parkersburg, or to the North Central Regional Jail in Greenwood.

The Lathrop Russell Charter House, Doddridge County Courthouse, Silas P. Smith Opera House, and W. Scott Stuart House are individually listed on the National Register of Historic Places. West Union is also home to two nationally recognized historic districts: West Union Downtown Historic District and West Union Residential Historic District.

== Geography ==
According to the United States Census Bureau, the county has a total area of 320 square miles (830 km^{2}), of which 320 square miles (830 km^{2}) is land and 0.8 square miles (2.1 km^{2}) (0.2%) is water.

=== Major highways ===
- U.S. Route 50
- West Virginia Route 18
- West Virginia Route 23

=== Adjacent counties ===
- Wetzel County (north)
- Harrison County (east)
- Lewis County (southeast)
- Gilmer County (south)
- Ritchie County (west)
- Tyler County (northwest)

== Demographics ==
Historical population
Census	Pop.	Note	%±
1850	2,750		—
1860	5,203		89.2%
1870	7,076		36.0%
1880	10,552		49.1%
1890	12,183		15.5%
1900	13,689		12.4%
1910	12,672		−7.4%
1920	11,976		−5.5%
1930	10,488		−12.4%
1940	10,923		4.1%
1950	9,026		−17.4%
1960	6,970		−22.8%
1970	6,389		−8.3%
1980	7,433		16.3%
1990	6,994		−5.9%
2000	7,403		5.8%
2010	8,202		10.8%
2020	7,808		−4.8%
2025 (est.)	7,634	▼	−2.2%
U.S. Decennial Census; 1790–1960 1900–1990; 1990–2000 2010–2020

=== 2020 census ===
As of the 2020 census, the county had a population of 7,808. Of the residents, 17.7% were under the age of 18 and 19.0% were 65 years of age or older; the median age was 42.1 years. For every 100 females there were 130.1 males, and for every 100 females age 18 and over there were 135.8 males.

The racial makeup of the county was 93.5% White, 2.2% Black or African American, 0.2% American Indian and Alaska Native, 0.2% Asian, 0.4% from some other race, and 3.4% from two or more races. Hispanic or Latino residents of any race comprised 1.0% of the population.

There were 2,713 households in the county, of which 28.1% had children under the age of 18 living with them and 20.1% had a female householder with no spouse or partner present. About 25.0% of all households were made up of individuals and 12.9% had someone living alone who was 65 years of age or older.

Of those households, 66.9% were married couples living together, 16.9% had a female householder with no spouse present, and 13.6% had a male householder with no spouse present; the average household and family size was 3.65. The median income for a household was $58,750 and the poverty rate was 15.2%.

There were 3,241 housing units, of which 16.3% were vacant. Among occupied housing units, 80.9% were owner-occupied and 19.1% were renter-occupied. The homeowner vacancy rate was 1.3% and the rental vacancy rate was 6.0%.

Doddridge County, West Virginia – Racial and ethnic composition Note: the US Census treats Hispanic/Latino as an ethnic category. This table excludes Latinos from the racial categories and assigns them to a separate category. Hispanics/Latinos may be of any race.
Race / Ethnicity (NH = Non-Hispanic)	Pop 2000	Pop 2010	Pop 2020	% 2000	% 2010	% 2020
White alone (NH)	7,252	7,926	7,290	97.96%	96.63%	93.36%
Black or African American alone (NH)	18	111	174	0.24%	1.35%	2.22%
Native American or Alaska Native alone (NH)	22	24	15	0.29%	0.29%	0.19%
Asian alone (NH)	11	14	15	0.14%	0.17%	0.19%
Pacific Islander alone (NH)	0	1	0	0.00%	0.01%	0.00%
Other race alone (NH)	0	1	15	0.00%	0.01%	0.19%
Mixed race or Multiracial (NH)	58	86	222	0.78%	1.04%	2.84%
Hispanic or Latino (any race)	42	39	77	0.56%	0.47%	0.98%
Total	7,403	8,202	7,808	100.00%	100.00%	100.00%

=== 2010 census ===
As of the 2010 United States census, there were 8,202 people, 3,099 households, and 2,169 families living in the county. The population density was 25.7 inhabitants per square mile (9.9/km^{2}). There were 3,946 housing units at an average density of 12.3 units per square mile (4.7 units/km^{2}). The racial makeup of the county was 97.0% white, 1.4% black or African American, 0.3% American Indian, 0.2% Asian, 0.1% from other races, and 1.1% from two or more races. Those of Hispanic or Latino origin made up 0.5% of the population. In terms of ancestry, 24.3% were German, 16.8% were Irish, 11.7% were English, 10.3% were American, and 6.1% were French Canadian.

Of the 3,099 households, 28.6% had children under the age of 18 living with them, 55.7% were married couples living together, 9.1% had a female householder with no husband present, 30.0% were non-families, and 26.1% of all households were made up of individuals. The average household size was 2.41 and the average family size was 2.87. The median age was 42.4 years.

The median income for a household in the county was $30,019 and the median income for a family was $34,016. Males had a median income of $30,219 versus $21,121 for females. The per capita income for the county was $14,658. About 15.4% of families and 25.1% of the population were below the poverty line, including 36.7% of those under age 18 and 20.2% of those age 65 or over.

=== 2000 census ===
As of the census of 2000, there were 7,403 people, 2,845 households, and 2,102 families living in the county. The population density was 23 people per square mile (8.9 people/km^{2}). There were 3,661 housing units at an average density of 11 units per square mile (4.2 units/km^{2}). The racial makeup of the county was 98.31% White, 0.27% Black or African American, 0.31% Native American, 0.15% Asian, 0.14% from other races, and 0.82% from two or more races. 0.57% of the population were Hispanic or Latino of any race.

There were 2,845 households, out of which 32.50% had children under the age of 18 living with them, 59.30% were married couples living together, 10.30% had a female householder with no husband present, and 26.10% were non-families. 22.50% of all households were made up of individuals, and 10.90% had someone living alone who was 65 years of age or older. The average household size was 2.56 and the average family size was 2.98.

In the county, the population was spread out, with 25.00% under the age of 18, 8.40% from 18 to 24, 26.60% from 25 to 44, 25.10% from 45 to 64, and 14.80% who were 65 years of age or older. The median age was 39 years. For every 100 females, there were 101.90 males. For every 100 females age 18 and over, there were 98.10 males.

The median income for a household in the county was $26,744, and the median income for a family was $30,502. Males had a median income of $26,902 versus $20,250 for females. The per capita income for the county was $13,507. About 15.30% of families and 19.80% of the population were below the poverty line, including 23.00% of those under age 18 and 13.60% of those age 65 or over.

== Politics ==
After having leaned strongly towards the Democratic Party between the New Deal and Bill Clinton's presidency, most of West Virginia has since 2000 seen an extremely rapid swing towards the Republican Party due to declining unionization and differences with the Democratic Party's liberal views on social issues. In contrast, Doddridge County along with neighbouring Ritchie County and Tyler County were historically powerfully Unionist and have always been rock-ribbed Republican since the Civil War. Only two Democratic presidential candidates have won Doddridge County since West Virginia's statehood: Samuel J. Tilden in 1876, and Lyndon Johnson – who won by just six votes – in 1964.

United States presidential election results for Doddridge County, West Virginia
Year	Republican		Democratic		Third party(ies)	
Year	No.	%	No.	%	No.	%
1912	622	22.83%	866	31.79%	1,236	45.37%
1916	1,803	62.07%	1,061	36.52%	41	1.41%
1920	3,135	72.96%	1,137	26.46%	25	0.58%
1924	2,777	62.70%	1,594	35.99%	58	1.31%
1928	2,919	70.83%	1,202	29.17%	0	0.00%
1932	2,780	58.86%	1,943	41.14%	0	0.00%
1936	3,023	63.72%	1,716	36.17%	5	0.11%
1940	3,293	68.78%	1,495	31.22%	0	0.00%
1944	2,611	72.31%	1,000	27.69%	0	0.00%
1948	2,433	67.60%	1,166	32.40%	0	0.00%
1952	2,741	72.49%	1,040	27.51%	0	0.00%
1956	2,594	73.51%	935	26.49%	0	0.00%
1960	2,402	69.52%	1,053	30.48%	0	0.00%
1964	1,581	49.91%	1,587	50.09%	0	0.00%
1968	1,861	65.28%	844	29.60%	146	5.12%
1972	2,284	77.98%	645	22.02%	0	0.00%
1976	1,804	59.17%	1,245	40.83%	0	0.00%
1980	1,888	61.88%	1,043	34.19%	120	3.93%
1984	2,343	73.33%	836	26.17%	16	0.50%
1988	1,880	66.03%	955	33.54%	12	0.42%
1992	1,500	50.13%	968	32.35%	524	17.51%
1996	1,335	51.45%	865	33.33%	395	15.22%
2000	1,955	69.42%	773	27.45%	88	3.13%
2004	2,362	74.30%	800	25.17%	17	0.53%
2008	2,218	73.49%	735	24.35%	65	2.15%
2012	2,130	76.78%	575	20.73%	69	2.49%
2016	2,358	82.36%	362	12.64%	143	4.99%
2020	2,619	84.46%	435	14.03%	47	1.52%
2024	2,541	85.96%	374	12.65%	41	1.39%

== Communities ==
=== Town ===
- West Union (county seat)

=== Magisterial districts ===
- Beech
- Maple
- Oak
- Pine

=== Unincorporated communities ===
- Ashley
- Avon
- Avondale
- Big Battle
- Big Flint
- Big Isaac
- Blandville
- Center Point
- Central Station
- Doak
- Duckworth
- Greenwood
- Industrial
- Joy
- Miletus
- New Milton
- Nina
- Oxford
- Sedalia
- Smithburg
- Zinnia

== Notable people ==
- Matthew M. Neely, only West Virginian to serve in both houses of the US Congress and as governor.
- J. H. Diss DeBar, designed the Great Seal and Coat of Arms of West Virginia.
- Bantz J. Craddock, four-star U.S. Army general.
- Ephraim Bee, founder of the Ancient and Honorable Order of E Clampus Vitus.
- Lewis Maxwell (1790 - 1862), U.S. Representative from Virginia
- Clyde Ware, novelist (The Eden Tree) and television and motion picture director and screenwriter (No Drums, No Bugles).

== See also ==
- Doddridge County Schools
- National Register of Historic Places listings in Doddridge County, West Virginia
- North Bend Rail Trail
