= West Union, West Virginia =

- Town
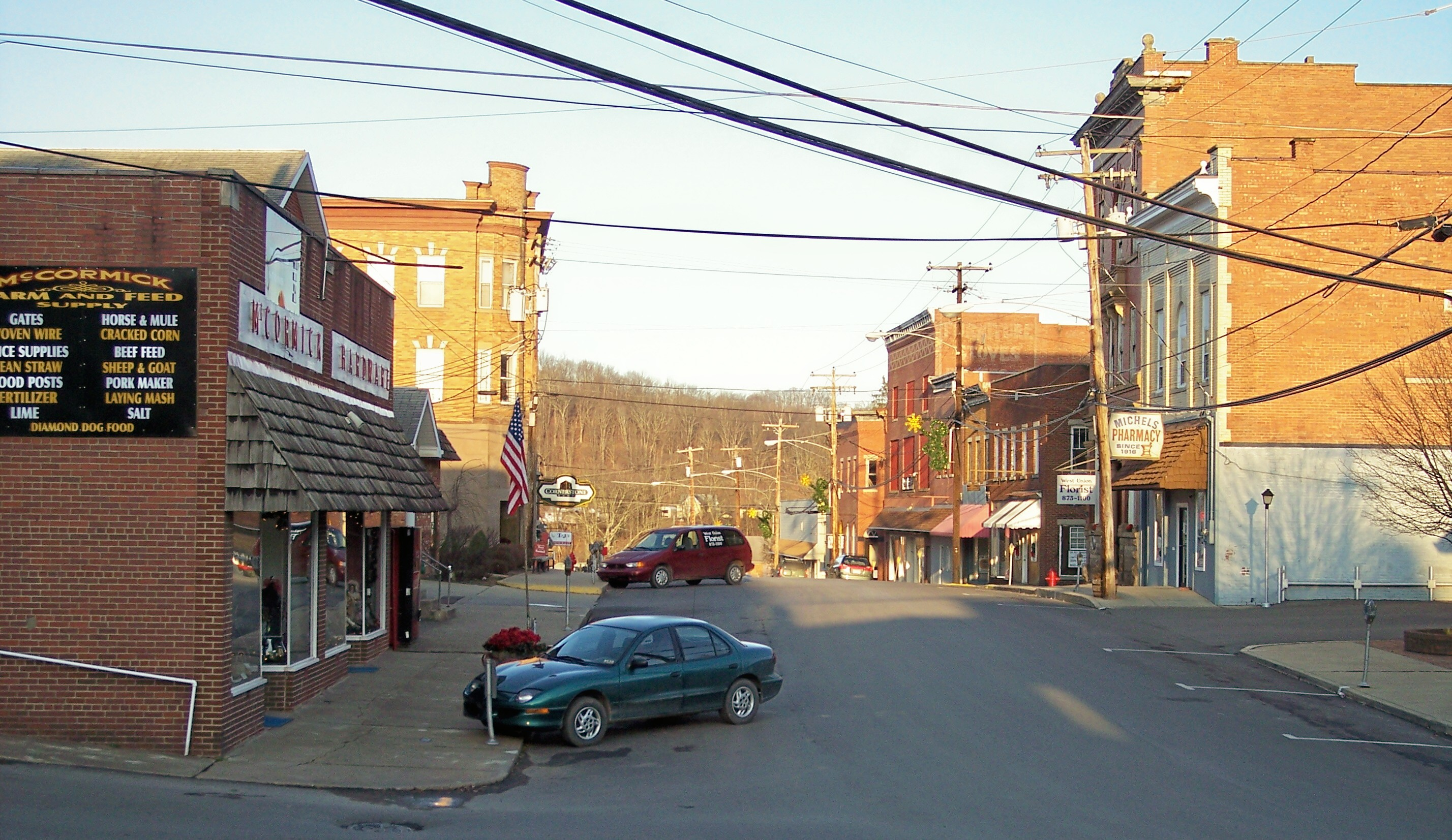
- Main Street in West Union in 2006

- Seal
- Interactive map of West Union, West Virginia
- Location within West Virginia Location within the United States
- Coordinates: 39°17′44″N 80°46′33″W
- Country: United States
- State: West Virginia
- County: Doddridge
- Incorporated: 1881

Area
  - Total: 0.37 sq mi (0.97 km^{2})
  - Land: 0.36 sq mi (0.93 km^{2})
  - Water: 0.015 sq mi (0.04 km^{2})
- Elevation: 790 ft (240 m)

Population (2020)
  - Total: 653
  - Estimate (2021): 661
  - Density: 2,217.9/sq mi (856.35/km^{2})
- Time zone: UTC-5 (Eastern (EST))
  - Summer (DST): UTC-4 (EDT)
- ZIP code: 26456
- Area code: 304
- FIPS code: 54-86116
- GNIS feature ID: 1548944

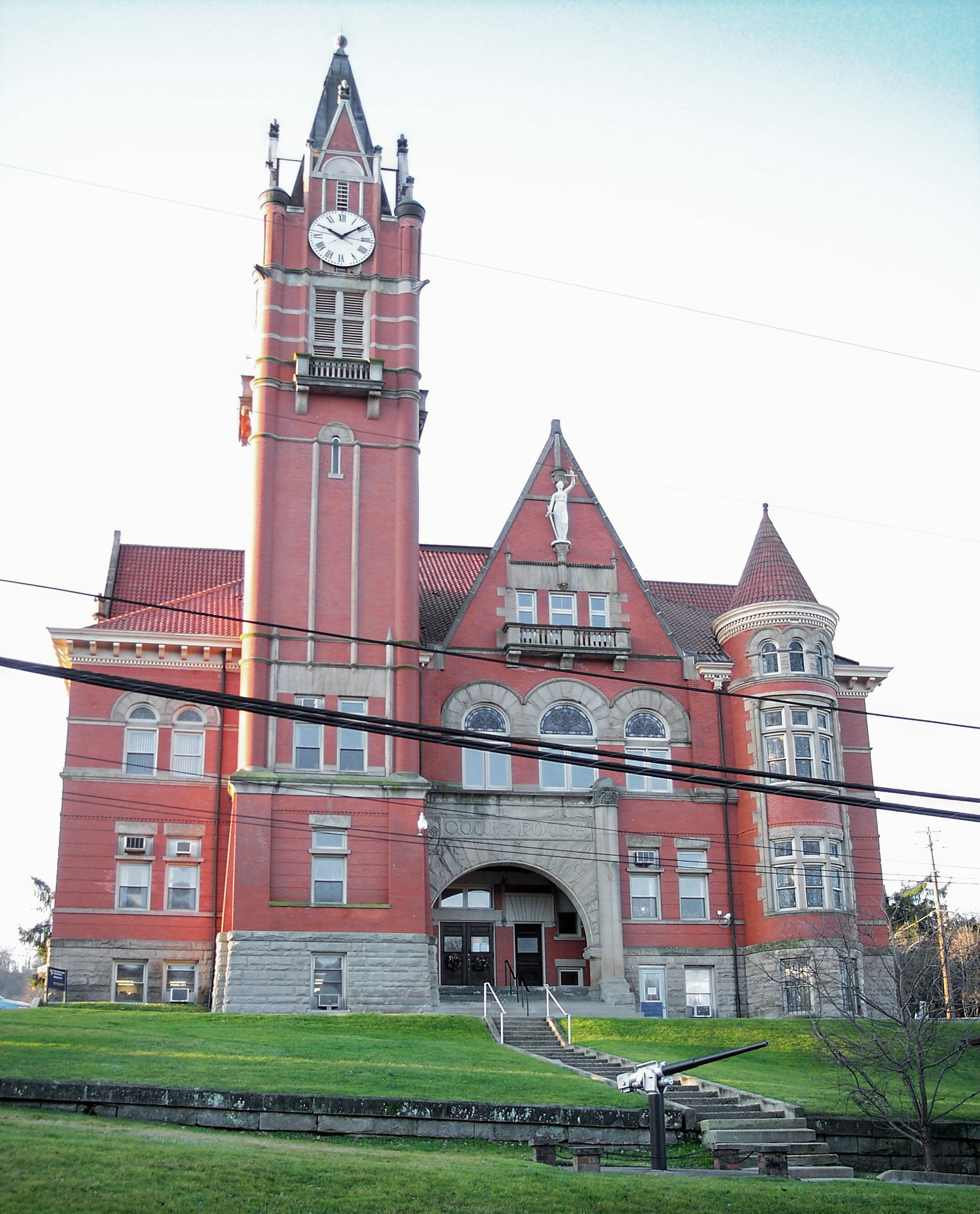
The Doddridge County Courthouse in West Union

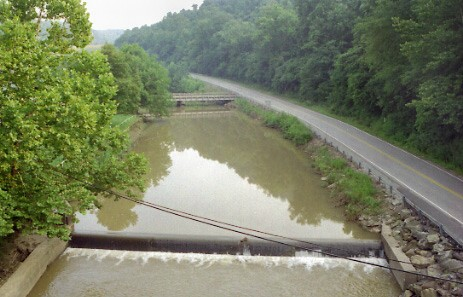
Middle Island Creek in West Union in 1996

West Union is a town in and the county seat of Doddridge County, West Virginia, United States. The population was 669 at the 2020 census. The town is located along Middle Island Creek at the junction of U.S. Route 50 and West Virginia Route 18; the North Bend Rail Trail also passes through the town. It was incorporated on July 20, 1881.

== History ==
=== 18th and 19th centuries ===
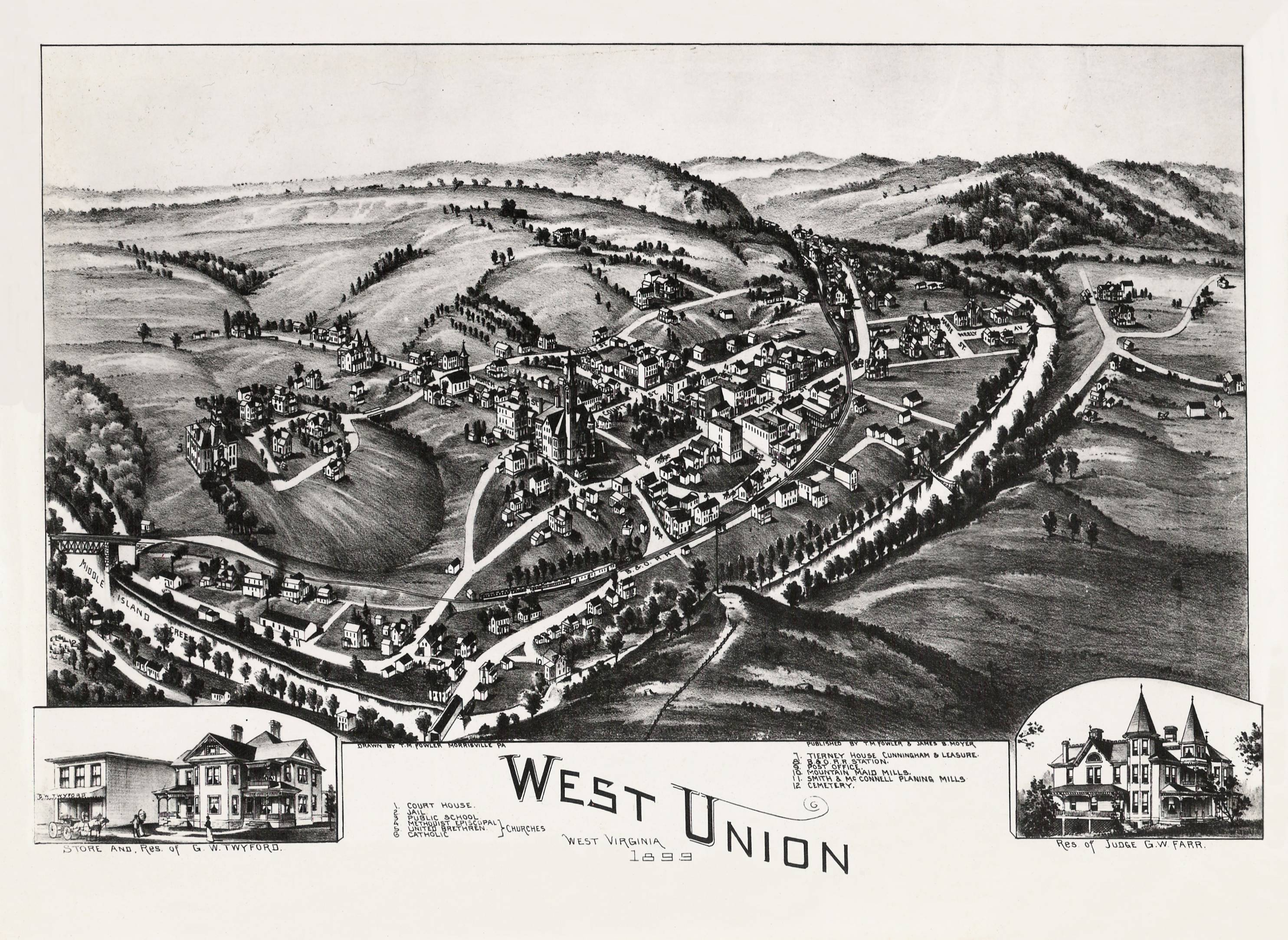
West Union, West Virginia, 1899

The area was first settled in the late 1780s by James Caldwell, who owned 20,000 acres (81 km^{2}) of land that included present West Union. Caldwell sold this land to Nathan Davis, Jr (1772-1866) and his brothers about 1807. They in turn sold 16,000 acres (65 km^{2}) to Lewis Maxwell (1790-1862), a Virginia congressman.

The settlement was originally called Lewisport, but Davis later supposedly suggested the name of "West Union", in deference to a proposed town of Union to be built on the eastern side of Middle Island Creek. (Union has disappeared, if it ever existed.) According to an early resident, A.A. Bee: "The first bridge across Middle Island Creek [at West Union] was of hewed logs with a center abutment of stones. In the great flood of 1835 it was washed away". In 1842, a contract was awarded to the well-known civil engineer Claudius Crozet to build a new covered bridge at West Union, as part of a series of public works along the Northwestern Turnpike. Ephraim Bee (1802–1888), a local blacksmith (who was also a district officer, magistrate, state legislator, hotelier, and postmaster at various times) made all the bolts and bands for the West Union Covered Bridge which was completed in 1843.

On the night of March 27, 1858, a fire utterly devastated the town of West Union. At the time, many of the citizens were attending the U.S. court at Clarksburg, and so were not available for fire suppression efforts. The fire originated in an upper room of the residence of Lathrop Russell Charter. The flames spread quickly to other buildings: first, a large hotel and store room belonging to James A. Foley. Next came the residence of Ethelbert Bond and a storehouse belonging to Arthur Ingram. Other buildings followed and the next morning the entire settlement appeared a "mass of smoldering ruins". The Parkersburg and Grafton branch of the Baltimore and Ohio Railroad had just been completed, however, and the town was able to revive economically and structurally fairly quickly.

Nearby Maxwell Ridge — named for the family of Congressman Maxwell — is said to have a cave that was used by the Underground Railroad in the years leading up to the Civil War.

West Union was home to Matthew M. Neely, grandfather of West Virginia's 21st governor. Governor Matthew M. Neely, also a US Senator, was born in 1874 just south of the town.

West Union was incorporated on July 20, 1881.

=== 20th century ===
Doddridge County's oil and gas industry was a boon to West Union. By 1906, the Ideal Glass Factory opened to take advantage of the abundant gas. It was followed by the Doddridge County Window Glass Company. The two plants employed about 300 people. In later years a garment factory opened, but closed in the 1970s. A long-remembered flood devastated West Union in June 1950, destroying homes and businesses and killing 22 people throughout the county. (One casualty was the 107-year-old covered bridge.)

Today farming, timbering, oil and gas, and the business of county government and public education support the area, and many people commute to jobs in Salem, Clarksburg, and Parkersburg, or to the North Central Regional Jail in Greenwood.

The Lathrop Russell Charter House, Doddridge County Courthouse, Silas P. Smith Opera House, and W. Scott Stuart House are individually listed on the National Register of Historic Places. West Union is also home to two nationally recognized historic districts: West Union Downtown Historic District and West Union Residential Historic District.

== Geography ==
West Union is located at 39°17′44″N 80°46′33″W (39.295594, -80.775888).

According to the United States Census Bureau, the town has a total area of 0.38 square miles (0.98 km^{2}), of which 0.36 square miles (0.93 km^{2}) is land and 0.02 square miles (0.05 km^{2}) is water.

=== Climate ===
The climate in this area is characterized by hot, humid summers and generally mild to cool winters. According to the Köppen Climate Classification system, West Union has a humid subtropical climate, abbreviated "Cfa" on climate maps.

Climate data for West Union, West Virginia (1991–2020 normals, extremes 1971–present)
Month	Jan	Feb	Mar	Apr	May	Jun	Jul	Aug	Sep	Oct	Nov	Dec	Year
Record high °F (°C)	76 (24)	81 (27)	87 (31)	90 (32)	92 (33)	97 (36)	103 (39)	101 (38)	98 (37)	95 (35)	82 (28)	78 (26)	103 (39)
Mean maximum °F (°C)	65.3 (18.5)	68.4 (20.2)	76.9 (24.9)	84.8 (29.3)	88.3 (31.3)	90.6 (32.6)	92.3 (33.5)	91.5 (33.1)	90.1 (32.3)	83.5 (28.6)	75.6 (24.2)	66.7 (19.3)	93.5 (34.2)
Mean daily maximum °F (°C)	40.9 (4.9)	44.4 (6.9)	54.0 (12.2)	67.0 (19.4)	75.2 (24.0)	81.7 (27.6)	84.8 (29.3)	84.1 (28.9)	79.0 (26.1)	67.9 (19.9)	55.6 (13.1)	45.3 (7.4)	65.0 (18.3)
Daily mean °F (°C)	30.9 (−0.6)	33.4 (0.8)	41.5 (5.3)	52.5 (11.4)	61.9 (16.6)	69.6 (20.9)	73.4 (23.0)	72.5 (22.5)	66.3 (19.1)	54.5 (12.5)	43.2 (6.2)	35.5 (1.9)	52.9 (11.6)
Mean daily minimum °F (°C)	20.8 (−6.2)	22.4 (−5.3)	28.9 (−1.7)	38.0 (3.3)	48.5 (9.2)	57.6 (14.2)	62.1 (16.7)	60.9 (16.1)	53.7 (12.1)	41.1 (5.1)	30.9 (−0.6)	25.7 (−3.5)	40.9 (4.9)
Mean minimum °F (°C)	−1.2 (−18.4)	2.4 (−16.4)	11.9 (−11.2)	23.9 (−4.5)	33.2 (0.7)	44.5 (6.9)	51.4 (10.8)	50.1 (10.1)	40.6 (4.8)	27.3 (−2.6)	17.3 (−8.2)	8.6 (−13.0)	−4.8 (−20.4)
Record low °F (°C)	−33 (−36)	−17 (−27)	−7 (−22)	15 (−9)	25 (−4)	32 (0)	38 (3)	40 (4)	28 (−2)	18 (−8)	7 (−14)	−18 (−28)	−33 (−36)
Average precipitation inches (mm)	3.69 (94)	3.51 (89)	4.25 (108)	3.89 (99)	5.09 (129)	4.93 (125)	5.73 (146)	3.66 (93)	3.68 (93)	3.47 (88)	3.21 (82)	3.98 (101)	49.09 (1,247)
Average snowfall inches (cm)	9.9 (25)	6.7 (17)	2.8 (7.1)	0.1 (0.25)	0.0 (0.0)	0.0 (0.0)	0.0 (0.0)	0.0 (0.0)	0.0 (0.0)	0.0 (0.0)	0.3 (0.76)	3.4 (8.6)	23.2 (59)
Average precipitation days (≥ 0.01 in)	15.6	13.4	13.6	13.7	14.6	13.0	12.5	11.2	10.0	11.1	11.8	14.9	155.4
Average snowy days (≥ 0.1 in)	5.3	4.1	1.6	0.1	0.0	0.0	0.0	0.0	0.0	0.0	0.4	3.0	14.5
Source: NOAA

== Demographics ==
Historical population
Census	Pop.	Note	%±
1880	356		—
1890	312		−12.4%
1900	623		99.7%
1910	779		25.0%
1920	1,270		63.0%
1930	984		−22.5%
1940	1,020		3.7%
1950	1,341		31.5%
1960	1,186		−11.6%
1970	1,141		−3.8%
1980	1,090		−4.5%
1990	830		−23.9%
2000	806		−2.9%
2010	825		2.4%
2020	653		−20.8%
2021 (est.)	661	▲	1.2%
U.S. Decennial Census

=== 2010 census ===
As of the census of 2010, there were 825 people, 362 households, and 217 families living in the town. The population density was 2,291.7 inhabitants per square mile (884.8/km^{2}). There were 452 housing units at an average density of 1,255.6 per square mile (484.8/km^{2}). The racial makeup of the town was 99.3% White, 0.2% Native American, 0.1% Asian, and 0.4% from two or more races. Hispanic or Latino of any race were 0.1% of the population.

There were 362 households, of which 29.0% had children under the age of 18 living with them, 43.1% were married couples living together, 12.4% had a female householder with no husband present, 4.4% had a male householder with no wife present, and 40.1% were non-families. 38.1% of all households were made up of individuals, and 19.6% had someone living alone who was 65 years of age or older. The average household size was 2.28 and the average family size was 2.96.

The median age in the town was 42.1 years. 24% of residents were under the age of 18; 6% were between the ages of 18 and 24; 23% were from 25 to 44; 25% were from 45 to 64; and 22% were 65 years of age or older. The gender makeup of the town was 48.5% male and 51.5% female.

=== 2000 census ===
As of the census of 2000, there were 806 people, 345 households, and 219 families living in the town. The population density was 2,197.3 inhabitants per square mile (848.4/km^{2}). There were 420 housing units at an average density of 1,145.0 per square mile (442.1/km^{2}). The racial makeup of the town was 99.5% White, 0.5% from other races. Hispanic or Latino of any race were 0.5% of the population.

There were 345 households, out of which 28.1% had children under the age of 18 living with them, 47.8% were married couples living together, 12.2% had a female householder with no husband present, and 36.5% were non-families. 33.3% of all households were made up of individuals, and 19.7% had someone living alone who was 65 years of age or older. The average household size was 2.34 and the average family size was 2.90.

In the town, the population was spread out, with 23.1% under the age of 18, 7.4% from 18 to 24, 23.0% from 25 to 44, 22.8% from 45 to 64, and 23.7% who were 65 years of age or older. The median age was 43 years. For every 100 females, there were 80.7 males. For every 100 females age 18 and over, there were 79.7 males.

The median income for a household in the town was $18,300, and the median income for a family was $21,875. Males had a median income of $25,000 versus $19,688 for females. The per capita income for the town was $10,539. About 28.3% of families and 33.8% of the population were below the poverty line, including 46.7% of those under age 18 and 17.9% of those age 65 or over.

== Notable people ==
- Lewis Maxwell (1790–1862), U.S. Representative from Virginia
- Ephraim Bee (1802–1888), founder of the Ancient and Honorable Order of E Clampus Vitus.
- Joseph H. Diss Debar (1817–1906), French-born artist and designer of the Seal of West Virginia
- Wayne Underwood (1913–1967), American football player
- Clyde Ware, Jr (1930–2010), Hollywood screenwriter/director and novelist; his The Eden Tree (1971) is a roman à clef about West Union in the 1930s, '40s and '50s
- Bantz J. Craddock (b. 1949), four-star U.S. Army general
