= Parkersburg–Vienna metropolitan area =

Coordinates: 39°22′N 81°31′W

Parkersburg–Marietta–Vienna, West Virginia–Ohio
- Combined Statistical Area
- Parkersburg–Marietta–Vienna, WV–OH, Combined Statistical Area
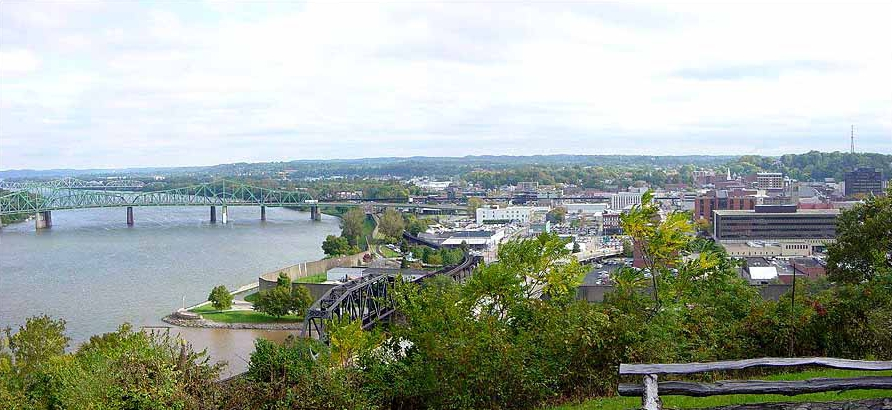
- Downtown Parkersburg as viewed from Fort Boreman Historical Park in 2006
Parkersburg–Marietta–Vienna, WV–OH CSA
Parkersburg–Vienna, WV MSA
Marietta, OH µSA
City of Parkersburg, WV
City of Vienna, WV
City of Marietta, OH
- Country: United States
- State: West Virginia; Ohio
- Largest city: Parkersburg, West Virginia
- Other cities: – Vienna, West Virginia – Marietta, Ohio

The Parkersburg–Vienna metropolitan area, officially the Parkersburg–Vienna, WV Metropolitan Statistical Area as defined by the United States Census Bureau, is an area consisting of two counties in West Virginia, anchored by the cities of Parkersburg and Vienna. As of the 2020 census, the MSA had a population of 89,490. Prior to the 2020 census, the metro area included the city of Marietta, Ohio and Washington County, which has since been redefined as its own micropolitan area. They now form the Parkersburg–Marietta–Vienna, WV–OH Combined Statistical Area.

== Counties ==
- Wirt County, West Virginia
- Wood County, West Virginia
- Washington County, Ohio

== Communities ==
=== Places with 10,000 to 30,000 inhabitants ===
- Parkersburg, West Virginia (Principal city)
- Marietta, Ohio (Principal city)
- Vienna, West Virginia (Principal city)

=== Places with 1,000 to 10,000 inhabitants ===
- Belmont, West Virginia
- Belpre, Ohio
- Beverly, Ohio
- Blennerhassett, West Virginia (census-designated place)
- Boaz, West Virginia (census-designated place)
- Devola, Ohio (census-designated place)
- Lubeck, West Virginia (census-designated place)
- Mineral Wells, West Virginia (census-designated place)
- St. Marys, West Virginia
- Washington, West Virginia (census-designated place)
- Williamstown, West Virginia

=== Places with less than 1,000 inhabitants ===
- Elizabeth, West Virginia
- Lowell, Ohio
- Lower Salem, Ohio
- Macksburg, Ohio
- Matamoras, Ohio
- North Hills, West Virginia

=== Unincorporated places ===
- Barlow, Ohio
- Bartlett, Ohio
- Burning Springs, West Virginia
- Calcutta, West Virginia
- Coal Run, Ohio
- Cutler, Ohio
- Fleming, Ohio

- Germantown, Ohio
- Hebron, West Virginia
- Little Hocking, Ohio
- Newport, Ohio
- Palestine, West Virginia
- Pine Grove, West Virginia

- Reno, Ohio
- Vincent, Ohio
- Waterford, Ohio
- Watertown, Ohio
- Whipple, Ohio
- Wingett Run, Ohio

=== Townships (Washington County, Ohio) ===
- Adams
- Aurelius
- Barlow
- Belpre
- Decatur
- Dunham
- Fairfield
- Fearing

- Grandview
- Independence
- Lawrence
- Liberty
- Ludlow
- Marietta
- Muskingum

- Newport
- Palmer
- Salem
- Warren
- Waterford
- Watertown
- Wesley

== Demographics ==
Historical population
Census	Pop.	Note	%±
1970	155,406		—
1980	171,072		10.1%
1990	161,907		−5.4%
2000	164,624		1.7%
2010	162,056		−1.6%
2015 (est.)	161,118		−0.6%
U.S. Decennial Census

As of the census of 2000, there were 164,624 people, 66,583 households, and 46,390 families residing within the MSA. The racial makeup of the MSA was 97.41% White, 0.93% African American, 0.23% Native American, 0.45% Asian, 0.04% Pacific Islander, 0.13% from other races, and 0.80% from two or more races. Hispanic or Latino of any race were 0.54% of the population.

The median income for a household in the MSA was $32,761, and the median income for a family was $38,427. Males had a median income of $31,772 versus $26,499 for females. The per capita income for the MSA was $16,769.

== See also ==
- West Virginia census statistical areas
- Ohio census statistical areas
