= McKim =

McKim is a surname. Notable people with the surname include:

- Alexander McKim (1748–1832), American politician from Maryland
- Andrew McKim (born 1970), Canadian ice hockey player
- Anne M. McKim, Scottish-New Zealand academic
- Charles Follen McKim (1847–1909), American architect
- Donald K. McKim (born 1950), American theologian
- Isaac McKim (1775–1838), American politician from Maryland, nephew of Alexander
- James Miller McKim (1810–1874), Presbyterian minister and abolitionist
- Josephine McKim (1910–1992), American swimmer
- Lucy McKim Garrison, American song collector
- Nick McKim (born 1965), Australian politician
- Randolph Harrison McKim (1842–1920), American Episcopal clergy and writer
- Robert McKim (disambiguation), multiple people
- Ruby McKim (1891–1976), English quilt designer, entrepreneur, and writer
- Sammy McKim (1924–2004), Canadian film actor

== See also ==
- 7845 Mckim (1996 AC), a Main-belt Asteroid discovered in 1996
- Ann McKim (clipper), famous Baltimore clipper, built in 1833
- McKim Observatory, astronomical observatory owned and operated by DePauw University
- McKim, Mead, and White, prominent architectural firm in the eastern US at the turn of the 20th century
- McKim, West Virginia
- McKim's School, historic school located in Baltimore, Maryland, United States
