= Arvilla =

Arvilla may refer to:

- Arvilla, North Dakota, a community in Grand Forks County, North Dakota, in the United States
- Arvilla, West Virginia
- USS Arvilla (SP-752), a US Navy patrol boat in commission from 1917 to 1919
- Arvilla (grape), a Spanish wine grape
