= Joseph Barker House =

Joseph Barker House may refer to:

- Judge Joseph Barker House
- Colonel Joseph Barker House
