= Bull Smith =

American baseball player (1880–1928)

- Outfielder
- Born: August 20, 1880; Plum, West Virginia, U.S.
- Died: May 1, 1928 (aged 47); Charleston, West Virginia, U.S.
- Batted: Right Threw: Right

MLB debut
- August 30, 1904, for the Pittsburgh Pirates

Last MLB appearance
- August 30, 1911, for the Washington Senators

MLB statistics
- Batting average: .140
- Home runs: 0
- Runs batted in: 0
- Stats at Baseball Reference

Teams
- Pittsburgh Pirates (1904); Chicago Cubs (1906); Washington Senators (1911)

Bull Smith
Profile
- Position: Halfback

Career information
- College: West Virginia

Career history

Playing
- 1905: Canton Athletic Club
- 1906: Canton Bulldogs

Coaching
- 1903: West Virginia Wesleyan

Lewis Oscar "Bull" Smith (August 20, 1880 – May 1, 1928) was a Major League Baseball outfielder. He played from 1904 to 1911 for the Chicago Cubs, Pittsburgh Pirates, and Washington Senators. In 1911 Bull was asked to “teach the finer points of the game” as a coach for the Washington Senators. Bull was given an official at-bat for the big club for his services. He took a walk. Smith attended West Virginia University, where he played four seasons (1900–1903) of college baseball for the Mountaineers.

Outside of baseball, Smith played football in 1905 for the Canton Athletic Club. He remained with the team in 1906 as they were renamed the Canton Bulldogs. Smith and Canton played in the "Ohio League", which was the direct predecessor to the National Football League. Smith played halfback for the Bulldogs in 1906 when a betting scandal involving Canton and their rival, the Massillon Tigers, arose.. The scandal, the first major match-fixing controversy in American professional football history, centered on allegations by a Massillon newspaper that Canton coach Blondy Wallace had conspired with Massillon end Walter East to fix their two-game championship series: Canton would win the first game and Massillon the second, forcing a lucrative deciding third game. A second account alleged that Wallace had attempted to bribe Massillon players to throw a game outright. Massillon Tigers stars Bob Shiring and Tiny Maxwell stated that Canton operatives had approached them to throw the contest, and that they had declined. Canton denied all charges. The scandal was never definitively resolved but it severely damaged the reputation of both clubs and reportedly contributed to the decline of professional football in Ohio for nearly a decade.

== Head coaching record ==
Year	Team	Overall	Conference	Standing	Bowl/playoffs
West Virginia Wesleyan Bobcats (Independent) (1903)
1903	West Virginia Wesleyan	3–4			
Richmond:		3–4			
Total:		3–4			
