= Union Mills, Pleasants County, West Virginia =

Union Mills
- Unincorporated community
- Location within the state of West Virginia Union Mills (the United States)
- Coordinates: 39°23′28″N 81°8′6″W
- Country: United States
- State: West Virginia
- County: Pleasants
- Elevation: 633 ft (193 m)
- Time zone: UTC-5 (Eastern (EST))
  - Summer (DST): UTC-4 (EDT)
- GNIS ID: 1555852

Union Mills is an unincorporated community in Pleasants County, West Virginia, United States. The community is located along McKim Creek at its confluence with Middle Island Creek.
