= 1896 United States presidential election in West Virginia =

- November 3, 1896

Nominee	William McKinley	William Jennings Bryan
Party	Republican	Democratic
Home state	Ohio	Nebraska
Running mate	Garret Hobart	Arthur Sewall
Electoral vote	6	0
Popular vote	105,379	94,480
Percentage	52.23%	46.83%
County results
McKinley
40–50%
50–60%
60–70%
70–80%
Bryan
50–60%
60–70%
70–80%
President before election
Grover Cleveland
Democratic
Elected President
William McKinley
Republican

The 1896 United States presidential election in West Virginia took place on November 3, 1896. All contemporary 45 states were part of the 1896 United States presidential election. Voters chose six electors to the Electoral College, which selected the president and vice president.

West Virginia was won by the Republican nominees, former Ohio Governor William McKinley and his running mate Garret Hobart of New Jersey. They defeated the Democratic nominee, former U.S. Representative from Nebraska William Jennings Bryan and his running mate Arthur Sewall. McKinley won the state by a margin of 5.4%,

This was the first time the Republicans had carried West Virginia since Ulysses S. Grant in 1872. From 1896 to 1928, West Virginia voted Republican in every election except for 1912.

McKinley's win resulted substantially from the fact that workers in West Virginia's growing coal industry opposed Bryan's free silver policy because it would cause inflation.

Bryan would lose West Virginia to McKinley again four years later and would later lose the state again in 1908 to William Howard Taft.

== Results ==
1896 United States presidential election in West Virginia
Party	Candidate	Votes	Percentage	Electoral votes
Republican	William McKinley	105,379	52.23%	6
Democratic	William Jennings Bryan	94,480	46.83%	0
Prohibition	Joshua Levering	1,220	0.60%	0
National Democratic	John M. Palmer	678	0.34%	0
Totals		201,757	100.00%	6
Voter turnout				—

=== Results by county ===
1896 United States presidential election in West Virginia by county
County	William McKinley Republican		William Jennings Bryan Democratic		Joshua Levering Prohibition		John M. Palmer National Democratic		Margin		Total votes cast
County	#	%	#	%	#	%	#	%	#	%	Total votes cast
Barbour	1,573	48.90%	1,643	51.07%	0	0.00%	1	0.03%	-70	-2.18%	3,217
Berkeley	2,497	53.64%	2,084	44.77%	20	0.43%	54	1.16%	413	8.87%	4,655
Boone	678	45.32%	813	54.34%	3	0.20%	2	0.13%	-135	-9.02%	1,496
Braxton	1,453	39.52%	2,188	59.51%	28	0.76%	8	0.22%	-735	-19.99%	3,677
Brooke	935	54.74%	748	43.79%	20	1.17%	5	0.29%	187	10.95%	1,708
Cabell	3,127	49.98%	3,076	49.16%	32	0.51%	22	0.35%	51	0.82%	6,257
Calhoun	804	40.40%	1,186	59.60%	0	0.00%	0	0.00%	-382	-19.20%	1,990
Clay	661	52.05%	606	47.72%	2	0.16%	1	0.08%	55	4.33%	1,270
Doddridge	1,747	58.25%	1,231	41.05%	17	0.57%	4	0.13%	516	17.21%	2,999
Fayette	4,543	61.47%	2,783	37.66%	53	0.72%	11	0.15%	1,760	23.82%	7,390
Gilmer	1,000	42.25%	1,356	57.29%	8	0.34%	3	0.13%	-356	-15.04%	2,367
Grant	1,306	77.32%	372	22.02%	8	0.47%	3	0.18%	934	55.30%	1,689
Greenbrier	1,661	40.37%	2,414	58.68%	18	0.44%	21	0.51%	-753	-18.30%	4,114
Hampshire	676	25.98%	1,909	73.37%	2	0.08%	15	0.58%	-1,233	-47.39%	2,602
Hancock	843	57.54%	584	39.86%	34	2.32%	4	0.27%	259	17.68%	1,465
Hardy	547	31.47%	1,146	65.94%	0	0.00%	45	2.59%	-599	-34.46%	1,738
Harrison	3,027	54.53%	2,485	44.77%	26	0.47%	13	0.23%	542	9.76%	5,551
Jackson	2,527	52.16%	2,286	47.18%	26	0.54%	6	0.12%	241	4.97%	4,845
Jefferson	1,283	33.54%	2,453	64.13%	27	0.71%	62	1.62%	-1,170	-30.59%	3,825
Kanawha	6,948	58.65%	4,824	40.72%	47	0.40%	28	0.24%	2,124	17.93%	11,847
Lewis	1,813	50.32%	1,718	47.68%	68	1.89%	4	0.11%	95	2.64%	3,603
Lincoln	1,334	49.30%	1,364	50.41%	2	0.07%	6	0.22%	-30	-1.11%	2,706
Logan	382	27.36%	992	71.06%	1	0.07%	21	1.50%	-610	-43.70%	1,396
Marion	3,420	49.89%	3,304	48.20%	105	1.53%	26	0.38%	116	1.69%	6,855
Marshall	3,561	61.42%	2,108	36.36%	112	1.93%	17	0.29%	1,453	25.06%	5,798
Mason	3,066	54.96%	2,492	44.67%	10	0.18%	11	0.20%	574	10.29%	5,579
McDowell	2,635	72.65%	986	27.19%	2	0.06%	4	0.11%	1,649	45.46%	3,627
Mercer	2,388	52.74%	2,123	46.89%	12	0.27%	5	0.11%	265	5.85%	4,528
Mineral	1,547	53.27%	1,307	45.01%	40	1.38%	10	0.34%	240	8.26%	2,904
Mingo	632	34.33%	1,204	65.40%	2	0.11%	3	0.16%	-572	-31.07%	1,841
Monongalia	2,684	63.66%	1,482	35.15%	32	0.76%	18	0.43%	1,202	28.51%	4,216
Monroe	1,323	45.40%	1,579	54.19%	9	0.31%	3	0.10%	-256	-8.79%	2,914
Morgan	1,107	69.40%	433	27.15%	31	1.94%	24	1.50%	674	42.26%	1,595
Nicholas	908	41.25%	1,226	55.70%	62	2.82%	5	0.23%	-318	-14.45%	2,201
Ohio	6,721	56.56%	5,016	42.22%	68	0.57%	77	0.65%	1,705	14.35%	11,882
Pendleton	784	40.73%	1,117	58.03%	18	0.94%	6	0.31%	-333	-17.30%	1,925
Pleasants	887	48.87%	921	50.74%	3	0.17%	4	0.22%	-34	-1.87%	1,815
Pocahontas	632	38.89%	983	60.49%	3	0.18%	7	0.43%	-351	-21.60%	1,625
Preston	3,528	72.04%	1,331	27.18%	31	0.63%	7	0.14%	2,197	44.86%	4,897
Putnam	1,876	52.33%	1,702	47.48%	3	0.08%	4	0.11%	174	4.85%	3,585
Raleigh	1,150	50.91%	1,103	48.83%	2	0.09%	4	0.18%	47	2.08%	2,259
Randolph	1,427	41.73%	1,969	57.57%	14	0.41%	10	0.29%	-542	-15.85%	3,420
Ritchie	2,211	57.13%	1,601	41.37%	56	1.45%	2	0.05%	610	15.76%	3,870
Roane	1,849	46.34%	2,125	53.26%	11	0.28%	5	0.13%	-276	-6.92%	3,990
Summers	1,599	47.52%	1,746	51.89%	17	0.51%	3	0.09%	-147	-4.37%	3,365
Taylor	1,838	57.93%	1,307	41.19%	21	0.66%	7	0.22%	531	16.73%	3,173
Tucker	1,259	53.12%	1,111	46.88%	0	0.00%	0	0.00%	148	6.24%	2,370
Tyler	2,430	57.07%	1,799	42.25%	22	0.52%	7	0.16%	631	14.82%	4,258
Upshur	2,281	69.46%	949	28.90%	36	1.10%	18	0.55%	1,332	40.56%	3,284
Wayne	2,031	45.25%	2,443	54.43%	3	0.07%	11	0.25%	-412	-9.18%	4,488
Webster	709	42.18%	972	57.82%	0	0.00%	0	0.00%	-263	-15.65%	1,681
Wetzel	1,685	39.83%	2,524	59.65%	13	0.31%	9	0.21%	-839	-19.83%	4,231
Wirt	1,068	47.66%	1,159	51.72%	9	0.40%	5	0.22%	-91	-4.06%	2,241
Wood	4,043	53.30%	3,484	45.93%	31	0.41%	27	0.36%	559	7.37%	7,585
Wyoming	735	54.53%	613	45.47%	0	0.00%	0	0.00%	122	9.05%	1,348
Totals	105,379	52.23%	94,480	46.83%	1,220	0.60%	678	0.34%	10,899	5.40%	201,757

== See also ==
- United States presidential elections in West Virginia
