= Poynette =

Poynette may refer to the following places in the United States:

- Poynette, West Virginia
- Poynette, Wisconsin
