= 1900 United States presidential election in West Virginia =

- November 6, 1900
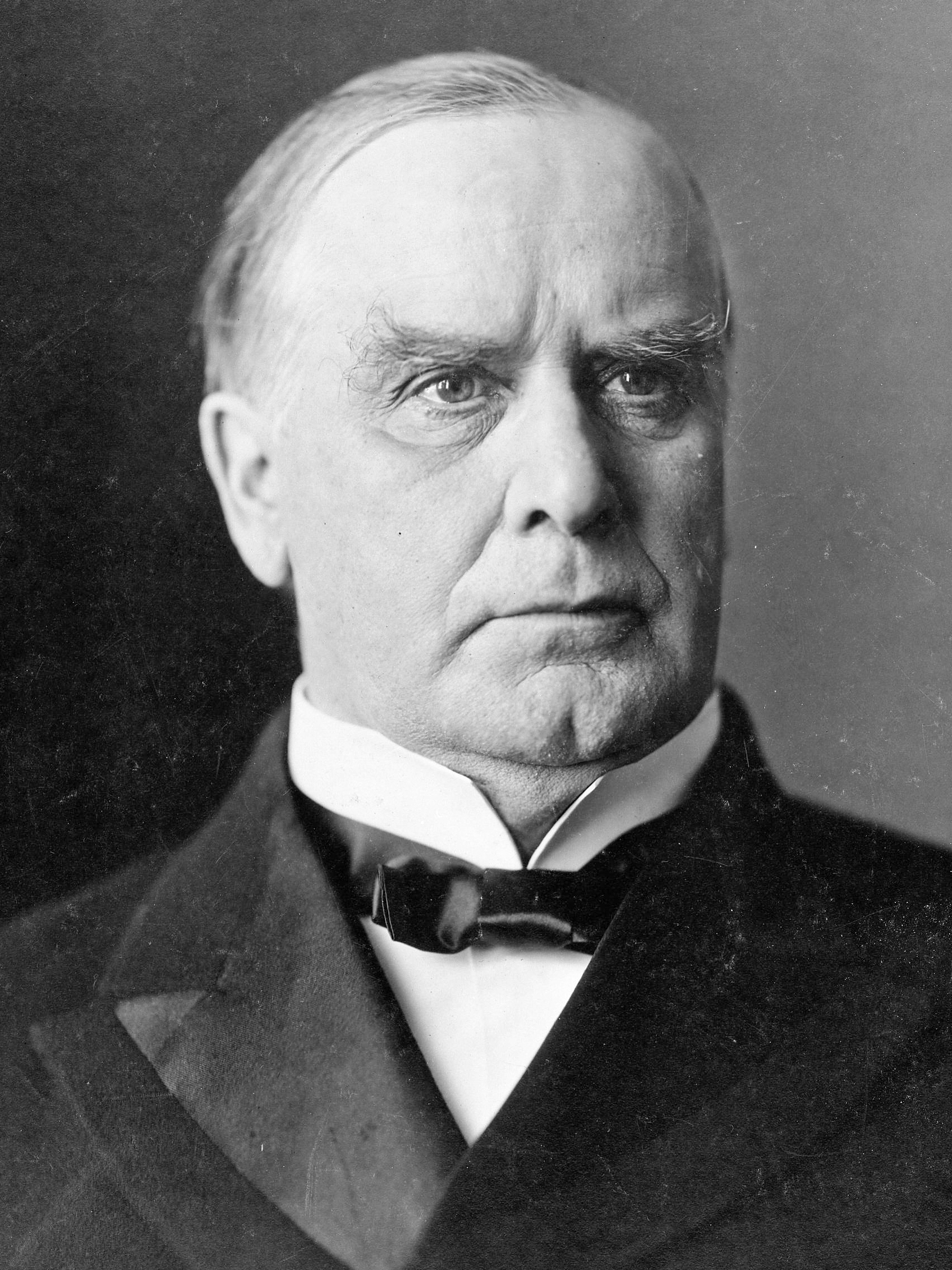

Nominee	William McKinley	William Jennings Bryan
Party	Republican	Democratic
Home state	Ohio	Nebraska
Running mate	Theodore Roosevelt	Adlai Stevenson I
Electoral vote	6	0
Popular vote	119,829	98,807
Percentage	54.27%	44.75%
County results
McKinley
40–50%
50–60%
60–70%
70–80%
Bryan
50–60%
60–70%
70–80%
President before election
William McKinley
Republican
Elected President
William McKinley
Republican

The 1900 United States presidential election in West Virginia took place on November 6, 1900. All contemporary 45 states were part of the 1900 United States presidential election. Voters chose six electors to the Electoral College, which selected the president and vice president.

West Virginia was won by the Republican nominees, incumbent President William McKinley of Ohio and his running mate Theodore Roosevelt of New York. They defeated the Democratic nominees, former U.S. Representative and 1896 Democratic presidential nominee William Jennings Bryan and his running mate, former Vice President Adlai Stevenson I. McKinley won the state by a margin of 9.52% in this rematch of the 1896 presidential election. The return of economic prosperity and recent victory in the Spanish–American War helped McKinley to score a decisive victory.

Bryan had previously lost West Virginia to McKinley four years earlier and would later lose it again in 1908 to William Howard Taft. McKinley was the last Republican until George W. Bush in 2004 to carry West Virginia twice.

== Results ==
1900 United States presidential election in West Virginia
Party	Candidate	Votes	Percentage	Electoral votes
Republican	William McKinley (incumbent)	119,829	54.27%	6
Democratic	William Jennings Bryan	98,807	44.75%	0
Prohibition	John G. Woolley	1,628	0.74%	0
Social Democratic	Eugene V. Debs	286	0.13%	0
Populist	Wharton Barker	246	0.11%	0
Totals		220,796	100.00%	6
Voter turnout				—

=== Results by county ===
1900 United States presidential election in West Virginia by county
County	William McKinley Republican		William Jennings Bryan Democratic		John G. Woolley Prohibition		Eugene V. Debs Socialist		Wharton Barker People's		Margin		Total votes cast
County	#	%	#	%	#	%	#	%	#	%	#	%	Total votes cast
Barbour	1,840	53.47%	1,579	45.89%	22	0.64%	0	0.00%	0	0.00%	261	7.59%	3,441
Berkeley	2,506	52.03%	2,287	47.49%	23	0.48%	0	0.00%	0	0.00%	219	4.55%	4,816
Boone	767	44.52%	956	55.48%	0	0.00%	0	0.00%	0	0.00%	-189	-10.97%	1,723
Braxton	1,894	47.02%	2,103	52.21%	16	0.40%	0	0.00%	15	0.37%	-209	-5.19%	4,028
Brooke	1,000	57.34%	717	41.11%	24	1.38%	3	0.17%	0	0.00%	283	16.23%	1,744
Cabell	3,667	52.50%	3,251	46.54%	59	0.84%	0	0.00%	8	0.11%	416	5.96%	6,985
Calhoun	946	42.36%	1,268	56.78%	6	0.27%	0	0.00%	13	0.58%	-322	-14.42%	2,233
Clay	902	55.30%	718	44.02%	7	0.43%	0	0.00%	4	0.25%	184	11.28%	1,631
Doddridge	1,893	60.23%	1,222	38.88%	22	0.70%	2	0.06%	4	0.13%	671	21.35%	3,143
Fayette	5,404	61.99%	3,230	37.05%	72	0.83%	7	0.08%	4	0.05%	2,174	24.94%	8,717
Gilmer	1,117	43.96%	1,410	55.49%	14	0.55%	0	0.00%	0	0.00%	-293	-11.53%	2,541
Grant	1,355	78.32%	367	21.21%	8	0.46%	0	0.00%	0	0.00%	988	57.11%	1,730
Greenbrier	1,870	43.01%	2,455	56.46%	18	0.41%	0	0.00%	5	0.11%	-585	-13.45%	4,348
Hampshire	659	24.33%	2,023	74.68%	8	0.30%	1	0.04%	18	0.66%	-1,364	-50.35%	2,709
Hancock	863	58.39%	564	38.16%	51	3.45%	0	0.00%	0	0.00%	299	20.23%	1,478
Hardy	596	31.50%	1,292	68.29%	4	0.21%	0	0.00%	0	0.00%	-696	-36.79%	1,892
Harrison	3,918	58.29%	2,678	39.85%	79	1.18%	3	0.04%	43	0.64%	1,240	18.45%	6,721
Jackson	2,840	56.03%	2,194	43.28%	24	0.47%	5	0.10%	6	0.12%	646	12.74%	5,069
Jefferson	1,207	30.43%	2,727	68.76%	31	0.78%	1	0.03%	0	0.00%	-1,520	-38.33%	3,966
Kanawha	7,249	60.17%	4,736	39.31%	0	0.00%	62	0.51%	1	0.01%	2,513	20.86%	12,048
Lewis	1,973	52.71%	1,702	45.47%	68	1.82%	0	0.00%	0	0.00%	271	7.24%	3,743
Lincoln	1,712	53.52%	1,487	46.48%	0	0.00%	0	0.00%	0	0.00%	225	7.03%	3,199
Logan	423	30.04%	985	69.96%	0	0.00%	0	0.00%	0	0.00%	-562	-39.91%	1,408
Marion	4,351	53.71%	3,612	44.59%	138	1.70%	0	0.00%	0	0.00%	739	9.12%	8,101
Marshall	3,790	61.66%	2,132	34.68%	189	3.07%	30	0.49%	6	0.10%	1,658	26.97%	6,147
Mason	3,162	56.03%	2,461	43.61%	10	0.18%	9	0.16%	1	0.02%	701	12.42%	5,643
McDowell	3,761	75.37%	1,218	24.41%	10	0.20%	1	0.02%	0	0.00%	2,543	50.96%	4,990
Mercer	2,699	55.75%	2,112	43.63%	20	0.41%	6	0.12%	4	0.08%	587	12.13%	4,841
Mineral	1,661	56.40%	1,241	42.14%	42	1.43%	1	0.03%	0	0.00%	420	14.26%	2,945
Mingo	838	38.07%	1,363	61.93%	0	0.00%	0	0.00%	0	0.00%	-525	-23.85%	2,201
Monongalia	2,978	64.15%	1,577	33.97%	83	1.79%	4	0.09%	0	0.00%	1,401	30.18%	4,642
Monroe	1,556	50.00%	1,532	49.23%	9	0.29%	0	0.00%	15	0.48%	24	0.77%	3,112
Morgan	1,091	64.10%	586	34.43%	25	1.47%	0	0.00%	0	0.00%	505	29.67%	1,702
Nicholas	1,051	44.40%	1,254	52.98%	62	2.62%	0	0.00%	0	0.00%	-203	-8.58%	2,367
Ohio	7,093	55.80%	5,394	42.44%	105	0.83%	116	0.91%	3	0.02%	1,699	13.37%	12,711
Pendleton	929	44.41%	1,154	55.16%	9	0.43%	0	0.00%	0	0.00%	-225	-10.76%	2,092
Pleasants	1,203	52.58%	1,085	47.42%	0	0.00%	0	0.00%	0	0.00%	118	5.16%	2,288
Pocahontas	793	44.23%	1,000	55.77%	0	0.00%	0	0.00%	0	0.00%	-207	-11.54%	1,793
Preston	3,800	73.43%	1,323	25.57%	42	0.81%	9	0.17%	1	0.02%	2,477	47.86%	5,175
Putnam	2,118	55.62%	1,676	44.01%	9	0.24%	5	0.13%	0	0.00%	442	11.61%	3,808
Raleigh	1,385	55.07%	1,126	44.77%	4	0.16%	0	0.00%	0	0.00%	259	10.30%	2,515
Randolph	1,771	45.09%	2,154	54.84%	0	0.00%	0	0.00%	3	0.08%	-383	-9.75%	3,928
Ritchie	2,512	59.19%	1,571	37.02%	149	3.51%	5	0.12%	7	0.16%	941	22.17%	4,244
Roane	2,156	50.28%	2,066	48.18%	19	0.44%	0	0.00%	47	1.10%	90	2.10%	4,288
Summers	1,751	49.01%	1,822	50.99%	0	0.00%	0	0.00%	0	0.00%	-71	-1.99%	3,573
Taylor	2,092	59.40%	1,416	40.20%	11	0.31%	0	0.00%	3	0.09%	676	19.19%	3,522
Tucker	1,694	58.47%	1,199	41.39%	0	0.00%	3	0.10%	1	0.03%	495	17.09%	2,897
Tyler	2,514	57.40%	1,831	41.80%	22	0.50%	2	0.05%	11	0.25%	683	15.59%	4,380
Upshur	2,400	73.28%	865	26.41%	4	0.12%	0	0.00%	6	0.18%	1,535	46.87%	3,275
Wayne	2,258	45.97%	2,654	54.03%	0	0.00%	0	0.00%	0	0.00%	-396	-8.06%	4,912
Webster	797	41.00%	1,147	59.00%	0	0.00%	0	0.00%	0	0.00%	-350	-18.00%	1,944
Wetzel	2,083	43.43%	2,664	55.55%	29	0.60%	4	0.08%	16	0.33%	-581	-12.11%	4,796
Wirt	1,235	51.63%	1,157	48.37%	0	0.00%	0	0.00%	0	0.00%	78	3.26%	2,392
Wood	4,808	56.46%	3,700	43.45%	0	0.00%	7	0.08%	1	0.01%	1,108	13.01%	8,516
Wyoming	898	54.00%	764	45.94%	1	0.06%	0	0.00%	0	0.00%	134	8.06%	1,663
Totals	119,829	54.29%	98,807	44.77%	1,548	0.70%	286	0.13%	246	0.11%	21,022	9.52%	220,716

== See also ==
- United States presidential elections in West Virginia
