= Pine Grove, West Virginia (disambiguation) =

Pine Grove, West Virginia may refer to multiple places:

- Pine Grove, Marion County, West Virginia
- Pine Grove, Pleasants County, West Virginia
- Pine Grove, Wetzel County, West Virginia, a town
