= McKim Creek =

McKim Creek may refer to:

- McKim Creek (Idaho), a tributary of the Salmon River (Idaho)
- McKim Creek (West Virginia), a tributary of Middle Island Creek
