= 1908 United States presidential election in West Virginia =

- November 3, 1908
- Turnout: 26.92% of the total population ▲1.89 pp

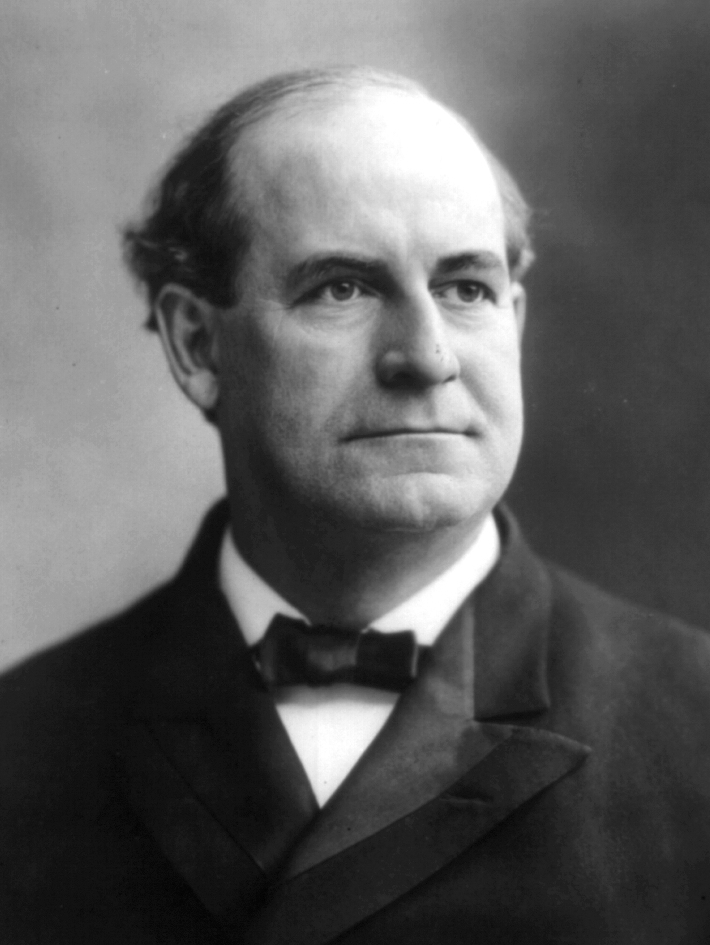
Nominee	William Howard Taft	William Jennings Bryan
Party	Republican	Democratic
Home state	Ohio	Nebraska
Running mate	James S. Sherman	John W. Kern
Electoral vote	7	0
Popular vote	137,869	111,418
Percentage	53.42%	43.17%
County results
Taft
40–50%
50–60%
60–70%
70–80%
Bryan
40–50%
50–60%
60–70%
70–80%
President before election
Theodore Roosevelt
Republican
Elected President
William Taft
Republican

The 1908 United States presidential election in West Virginia took place on November 3, 1908, as part of the 1908 United States presidential election. Voters chose seven representatives, or electors, to the Electoral College, who voted for president and vice president.

West Virginia was won by the 42nd Secretary of War William Howard Taft (R–Ohio), running with representative James S. Sherman, with 53.42 percent of the popular vote, against former representative William Jennings Bryan (D–Nebraska), running with John W. Kern, a former Indiana state senator with 43.17 percent of the popular vote. Taft won the state by a margin of 10.25%.

The Prohibition Party ran Eugene W. Chafin (P–Wisconsin) with Aaron S. Watkins, the president of Asbury College and received 1.99 percent of the vote. The Socialist Party of America chose four-time candidate for President of the United States Eugene V. Debs (S–Indiana), running with Ben Hanford, and received 1.43 percent of the popular vote.

Bryan had previously lost West Virginia to William McKinley in both 1896 and 1900.

== Results ==
1908 United States presidential election in West Virginia
Party	Candidate	Votes	%
Republican	William Howard Taft	137,869	53.42%
Democratic	William Jennings Bryan	111,418	43.17%
Prohibition	Eugene W. Chafin	5,139	1.99%
Socialist	Eugene V. Debs	3,679	1.43%
Total votes		258,105	100.00%

=== Results by county ===
1908 United States presidential election in West Virginia by county
County	William Howard Taft Republican		William Jennings Bryan Democratic		Eugene W. Chafin Prohibition		Eugene V. Debs Socialist		Other candidates Write-ins		Margin		Total votes cast
County	#	%	#	%	#	%	#	%	#	%	#	%	Total votes cast
Barbour	2,072	54.37%	1,634	42.88%	78	2.05%	27	0.71%			438	11.49%	3,811
Berkeley	2,675	49.98%	2,563	47.89%	100	1.87%	14	0.26%			112	2.09%	5,352
Boone	994	47.56%	1,031	49.33%	7	0.33%	58	2.78%			-37	-1.77%	2,090
Braxton	2,365	46.86%	2,565	50.82%	102	2.02%	15	0.30%			-200	-3.96%	5,047
Brooke	1,374	53.61%	1,074	41.90%	58	2.26%	57	2.22%			300	11.71%	2,563
Cabell	4,900	50.83%	4,467	46.34%	160	1.66%	111	1.15%	2	0.02%	433	4.49%	9,640
Calhoun	1,006	44.36%	1,212	53.44%	44	1.94%	6	0.26%			-206	-9.08%	2,268
Clay	1,320	59.06%	825	36.91%	68	3.04%	21	0.94%	1	0.04%	495	22.15%	2,235
Doddridge	1,773	62.50%	990	34.90%	46	1.62%	28	0.99%			783	27.60%	2,837
Fayette	5,874	56.27%	3,819	36.58%	282	2.70%	464	4.44%			2,055	19.69%	10,439
Gilmer	989	38.66%	1,512	59.11%	56	2.19%	1	0.04%			-523	-20.45%	2,558
Grant	1,305	78.14%	336	20.12%	25	1.50%	4	0.24%			969	58.02%	1,670
Greenbrier	2,415	46.50%	2,682	51.64%	49	0.94%	46	0.89%	2	0.04%	-267	-5.14%	5,194
Hampshire	683	27.58%	1,773	71.61%	19	0.77%	1	0.04%			-1,090	-44.02%	2,476
Hancock	1,185	59.73%	719	36.24%	60	3.02%	20	1.01%			466	23.49%	1,984
Hardy	646	34.55%	1,219	65.19%	1	0.05%	4	0.21%			-573	-30.64%	1,870
Harrison	4,946	52.40%	4,004	42.42%	397	4.21%	86	0.91%	6	0.06%	942	9.98%	9,439
Jackson	2,615	56.59%	1,950	42.20%	37	0.80%	19	0.41%			665	14.39%	4,621
Jefferson	1,255	32.84%	2,490	65.15%	76	1.99%	1	0.03%			-1,235	-32.31%	3,822
Kanawha	9,663	54.43%	7,117	40.09%	345	1.94%	624	3.51%	5	0.03%	2,546	14.34%	17,754
Lewis	2,239	52.79%	1,832	43.20%	149	3.51%	19	0.45%	2	0.05%	407	9.60%	4,241
Lincoln	2,202	55.08%	1,732	43.32%	58	1.45%	6	0.15%			470	11.76%	3,998
Logan	730	33.56%	1,399	64.32%	11	0.51%	33	1.52%	2	0.09%	-669	-30.76%	2,175
Marion	4,368	49.07%	3,961	44.50%	344	3.86%	222	2.49%	6	0.07%	407	4.57%	8,901
Marshall	3,680	55.46%	2,498	37.64%	220	3.32%	238	3.59%			1,182	17.81%	6,636
Mason	3,116	60.80%	1,928	37.62%	24	0.47%	56	1.09%	1	0.02%	1,188	23.18%	5,125
McDowell	6,176	75.90%	1,916	23.55%	45	0.55%	0	0.00%			4,260	52.35%	8,137
Mercer	4,229	57.96%	3,006	41.20%	24	0.33%	36	0.49%	1	0.01%	1,223	16.76%	7,296
Mineral	1,986	55.40%	1,512	42.18%	66	1.84%	17	0.47%	4	0.11%	474	13.22%	3,585
Mingo	2,058	57.23%	1,520	42.27%	9	0.25%	9	0.25%			538	14.96%	3,596
Monongalia	3,131	59.64%	1,758	33.49%	172	3.28%	187	3.56%	2	0.04%	1,373	26.15%	5,250
Monroe	1,523	49.54%	1,521	49.48%	29	0.94%	1	0.03%			2	0.07%	3,074
Morgan	1,134	65.78%	549	31.84%	37	2.15%	4	0.23%			585	33.93%	1,724
Nicholas	1,795	48.99%	1,730	47.22%	139	3.79%	0	0.00%			65	1.77%	3,664
Ohio	7,312	50.76%	6,497	45.10%	153	1.06%	441	3.06%	3	0.02%	815	5.66%	14,406
Pendleton	898	42.88%	1,193	56.97%	3	0.14%	0	0.00%			-295	-14.09%	2,094
Pleasants	987	50.54%	921	47.16%	41	2.10%	4	0.20%			66	3.38%	1,953
Pocahontas	1,687	54.99%	1,300	42.37%	73	2.38%	8	0.26%			387	12.61%	3,068
Preston	3,928	70.04%	1,454	25.93%	144	2.57%	81	1.44%	1	0.02%	2,474	44.12%	5,608
Putnam	2,098	53.63%	1,726	44.12%	36	0.92%	50	1.28%	2	0.05%	372	9.51%	3,912
Raleigh	2,530	55.16%	1,891	41.23%	44	0.96%	122	2.66%			639	13.93%	4,587
Randolph	2,363	44.92%	2,645	50.29%	142	2.70%	110	2.09%			-282	-5.36%	5,260
Ritchie	2,242	58.25%	1,346	34.97%	222	5.77%	38	0.99%	1	0.03%	896	23.28%	3,849
Roane	2,334	54.87%	1,868	43.91%	43	1.01%	9	0.21%			466	10.95%	4,254
Summers	1,940	47.31%	2,123	51.77%	35	0.85%	3	0.07%			-183	-4.46%	4,101
Taylor	2,106	54.89%	1,552	40.45%	129	3.36%	46	1.20%	4	0.10%	554	14.44%	3,837
Tucker	1,886	57.31%	1,265	38.44%	122	3.71%	18	0.55%			621	18.87%	3,291
Tyler	2,113	57.89%	1,355	37.12%	113	3.10%	69	1.89%			758	20.77%	3,650
Upshur	2,571	71.42%	846	23.50%	174	4.83%	9	0.25%			1,725	47.92%	3,600
Wayne	2,410	47.81%	2,590	51.38%	32	0.63%	9	0.18%			-180	-3.57%	5,041
Webster	932	43.03%	1,196	55.22%	32	1.48%	6	0.28%			-264	-12.19%	2,166
Wetzel	2,235	42.23%	2,874	54.31%	96	1.81%	85	1.61%	2	0.04%	-639	-12.07%	5,292
Wirt	1,028	48.81%	1,042	49.48%	29	1.38%	7	0.33%			-14	-0.66%	2,106
Wood	4,596	51.75%	4,063	45.74%	96	1.08%	127	1.43%			533	6.00%	8,882
Wyoming	1,251	58.90%	827	38.94%	44	2.07%	2	0.09%			424	19.96%	2,124
Totals	137,869	53.41%	111,418	43.16%	5,140	1.99%	3,679	1.43%	47	0.02%	26,451	10.25%	258,153

== See also ==
- United States presidential elections in West Virginia
