= Hi Carpenter Memorial Bridge =

Cantilever bridge between Ohio and West Virginia

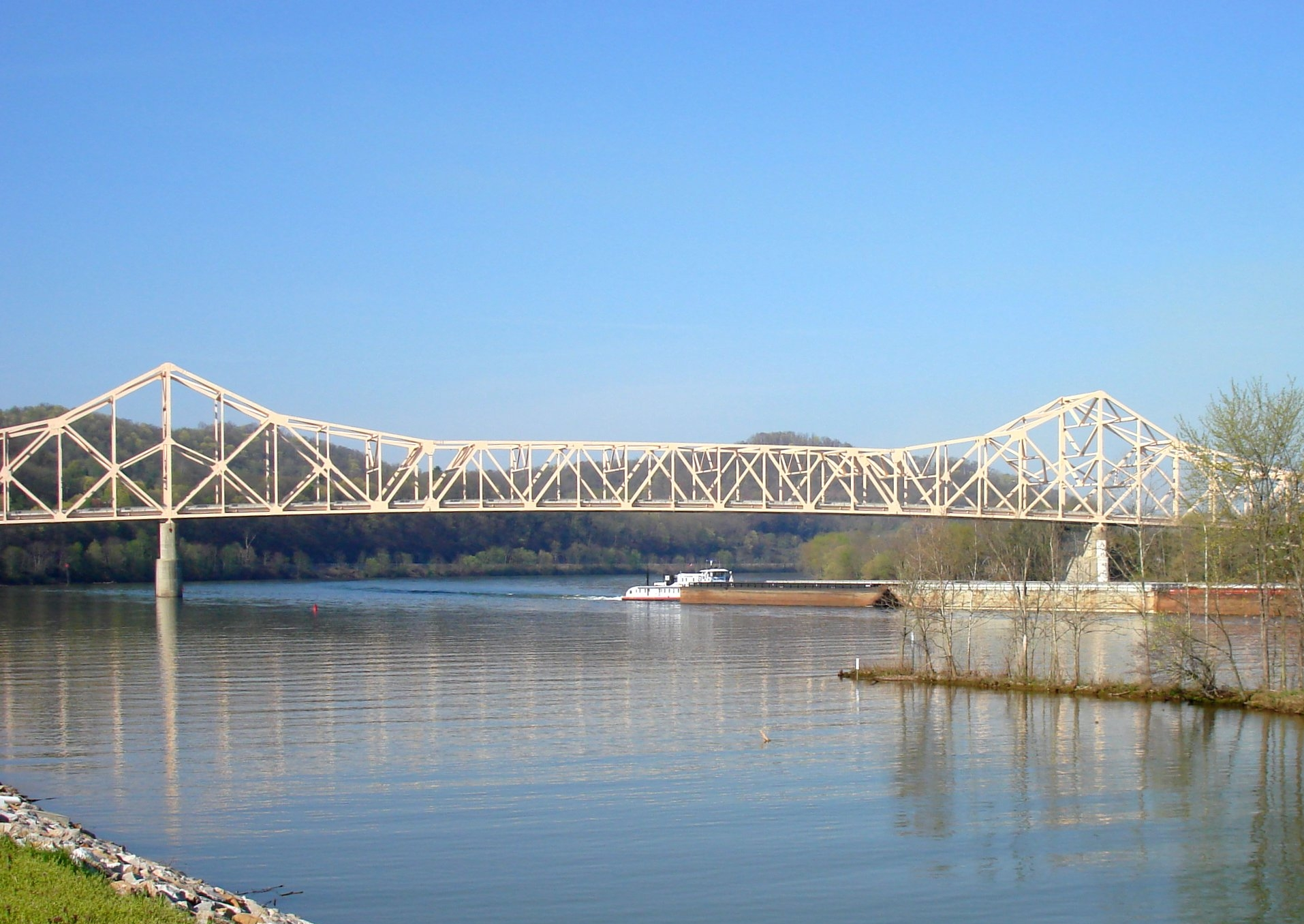
- Coordinates: 39°23′16″N 81°12′51″W
- Carries: 4 lanes of WV 807 / SR 807
- Crosses: Ohio River
- Maintained by: West Virginia Department of Transportation

Characteristics
- Design: Cantilever truss
- Total length: 2,579 feet (786 m)

History
- Designer: E. Lionel Pavlo Engineering Company, New York, N.Y.
- Construction start: June 19, 1973
- Construction cost: $25.1 million (US)
- Inaugurated: November 19, 1977

Location
- Interactive map of Hi Carpenter Memorial Bridge

The Hi Carpenter Memorial Bridge is a cantilever bridge over the Ohio River between Newport, Ohio and St. Marys, West Virginia. It carries Ohio State Route 807 (SR 807) and West Virginia Route 807 (WV 807) and serves to connect WV 2 with OH 7.

== Description ==
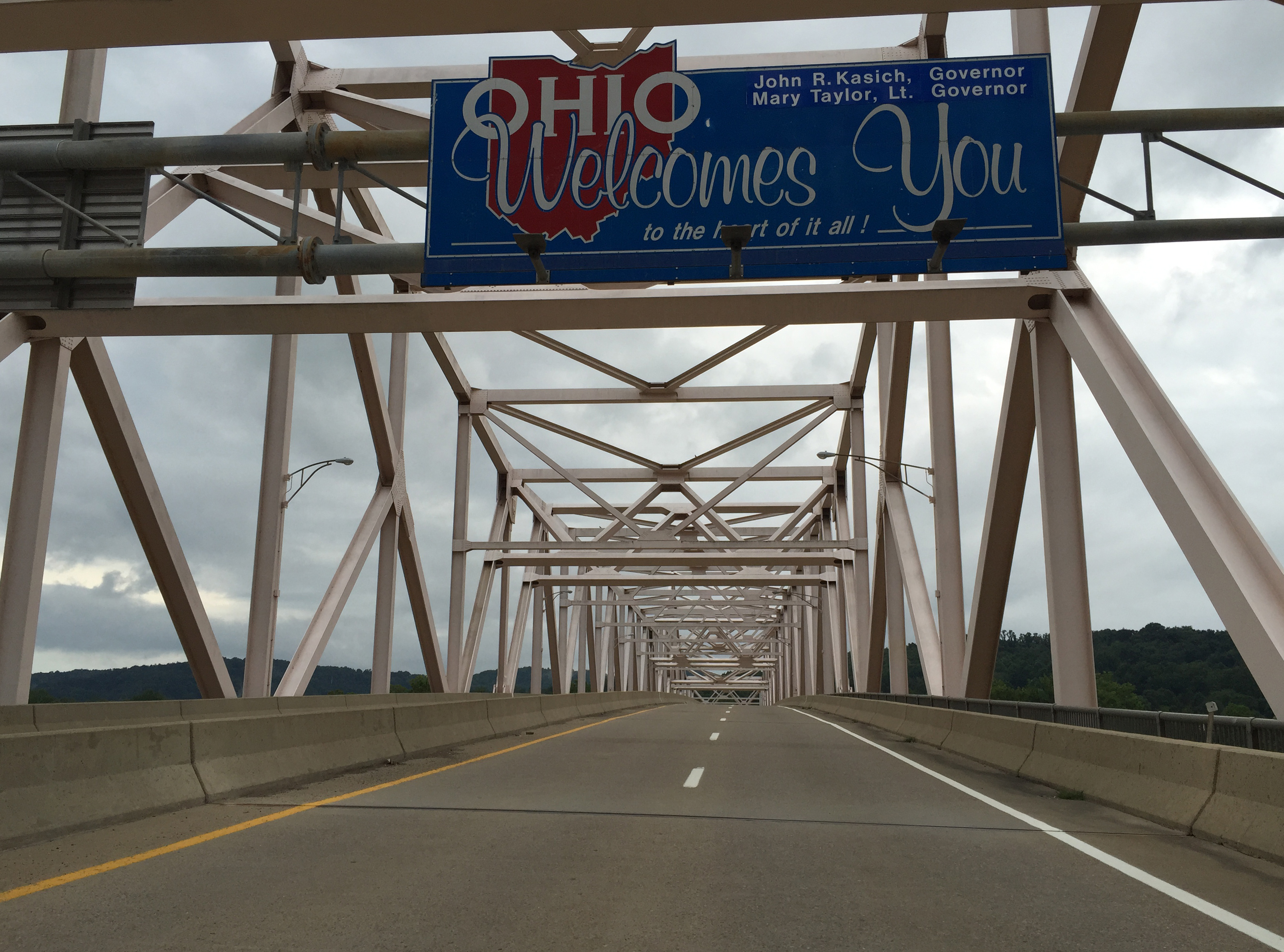
View while crossing the bridge from West Virginia to Ohio

The Hi Carpenter Memorial Bridge begins immediately to the north of the road's T intersection with WV 2 (Pleasants Highway) just west of the city of St. Marys in Pleasants County, West Virginia. WV 2 heads southwest toward Parkersburg and northeast into St. Marys, where it provides access to WV 16. The four-lane cantilever truss bridge crosses over CSX's Ohio River Subdivision rail line before crossing the Ohio River. The bridge crosses the West Virginia–Ohio state line near the Ohio bank of the river. The structure ends immediately after crossing over OH 7 just east of the unincorporated village of Newport in Newport Township in Washington County, Ohio. From the north end of the bridge, the northern approach road has a sharp U-curve to the southeast to its end at an intersection with OH 7. OH 7 heads west through Newport toward Marietta and northeast toward Matamoras. The Ohio portion of the bridge and its approach road is part of the 0.42-mile-long (0.68 km) OH 807. The West Virginia portion of the bridge and its approach road is part of WV 807.

Browse numbered routes
← SR 800	OH	→ SR 814
← WV 705	WV	→ WV 817

- Location: Ohio River near St Marys
- Length: 0.35 mi (560 m)

State Route 807
- Location: Ohio River near Newport

== History ==
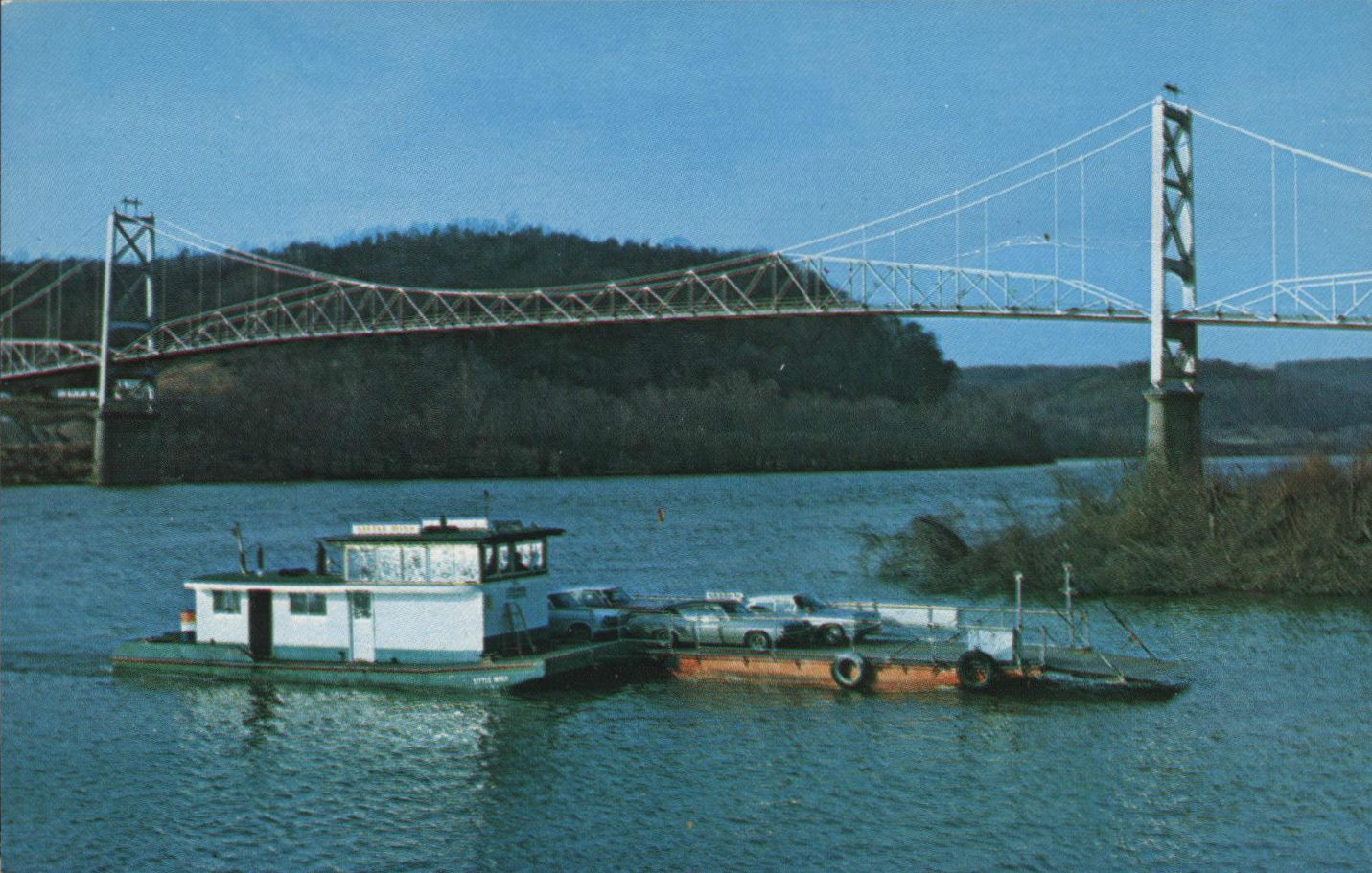
Photo of the original Hi Carpenter Bridge in 1970. The ferry in the foreground was used after the original bridge closed in 1967.

The Hi Carpenter Memorial Bridge was completed in 1977. This bridge replaced a 1928 eyebar suspension bridge that was closed immediately following the collapse of the similarly-designed Silver Bridge in 1967. SR 807 was established in 1977 with the completion of the current Hi Carpenter Memorial Bridge. The bridge is named in honor of Hiram A. Carpenter (December 3, 1880 – April 19, 1970), a well-known riverman who began his career ferrying mail between Raven Rock and Leith, Ohio, when he was 13 years old. He was successful in many enterprises, including the sand and gravel business, farming thirteen Ohio River islands that he owned at one time, apple raising, road construction, transportation, and his greatest undertaking, building the Short Route Bridge in 1928.

== See also ==
- List of crossings of the Ohio River
