= Cain House (St. Marys, West Virginia) =

Historic house in West Virginia, United States

- U.S. National Register of Historic Places
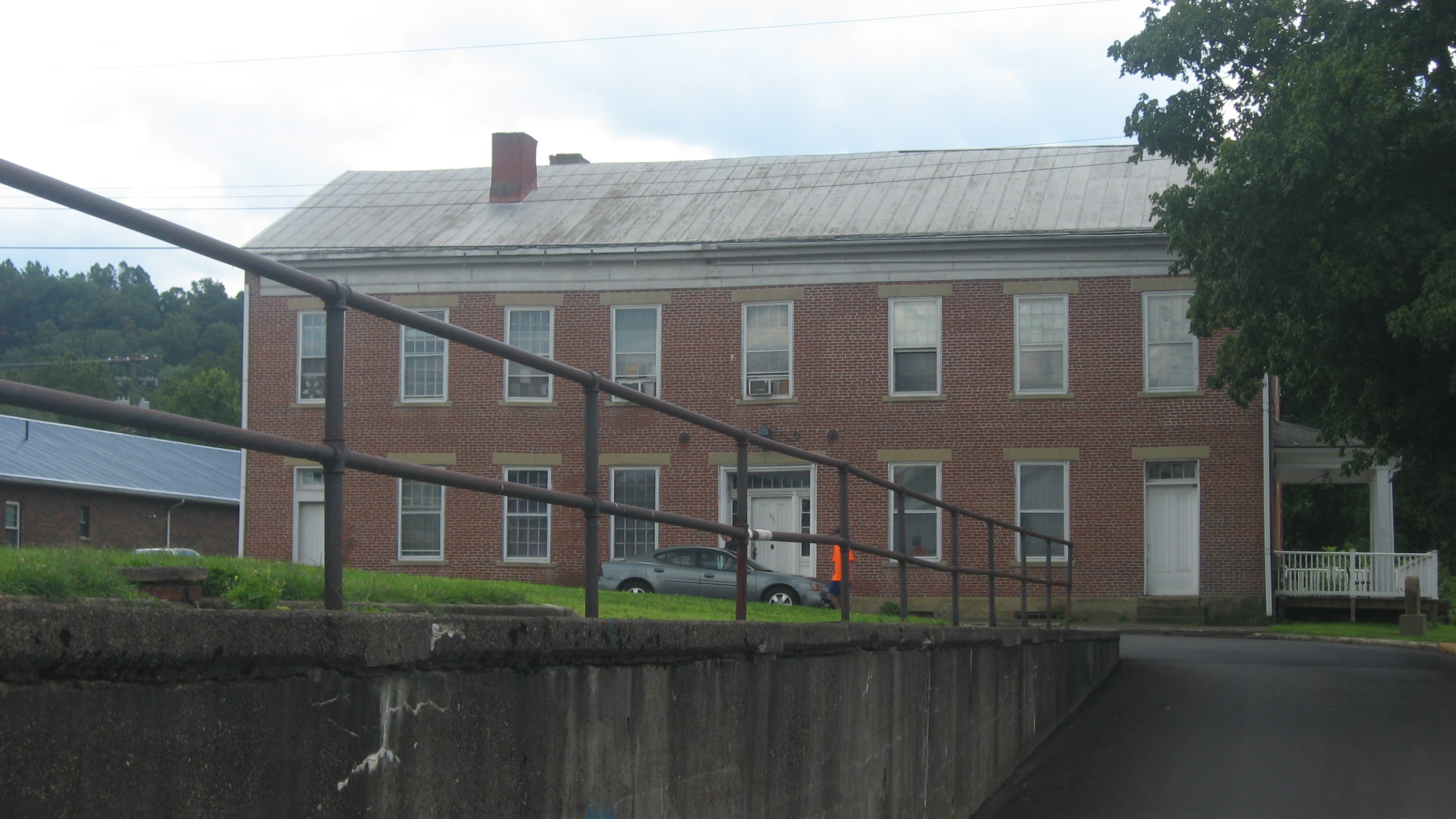
- Northern side

- Location within West Virginia Location within the United States
- Location: St. Marys, West Virginia
- Coordinates: 39°23′20″N 81°12′35″W
- Built: 1850
- Architectural style: Greek Revival
- NRHP reference No.: 80004037
- Added to NRHP: June 25, 1980

The Cain House, also known as the Alexander Creel Tavern and the St. Marys Lodge #41 A.F. & A. M. was built in 1850 for Alexander H. Creel in St. Marys, West Virginia. The Cain House provided lodging for travelers along the Ohio River, and functioned as a courthouse for Pleasants County immediately after its formation.

The Cain House was named for Zachariah Cain and his family, who operated the tavern in the late 19th and early 20th centuries. The house was acquired by a fraternal order, the Maccabees, before becoming home to a masonic lodge in 1957.
