= McKim Creek (West Virginia) =

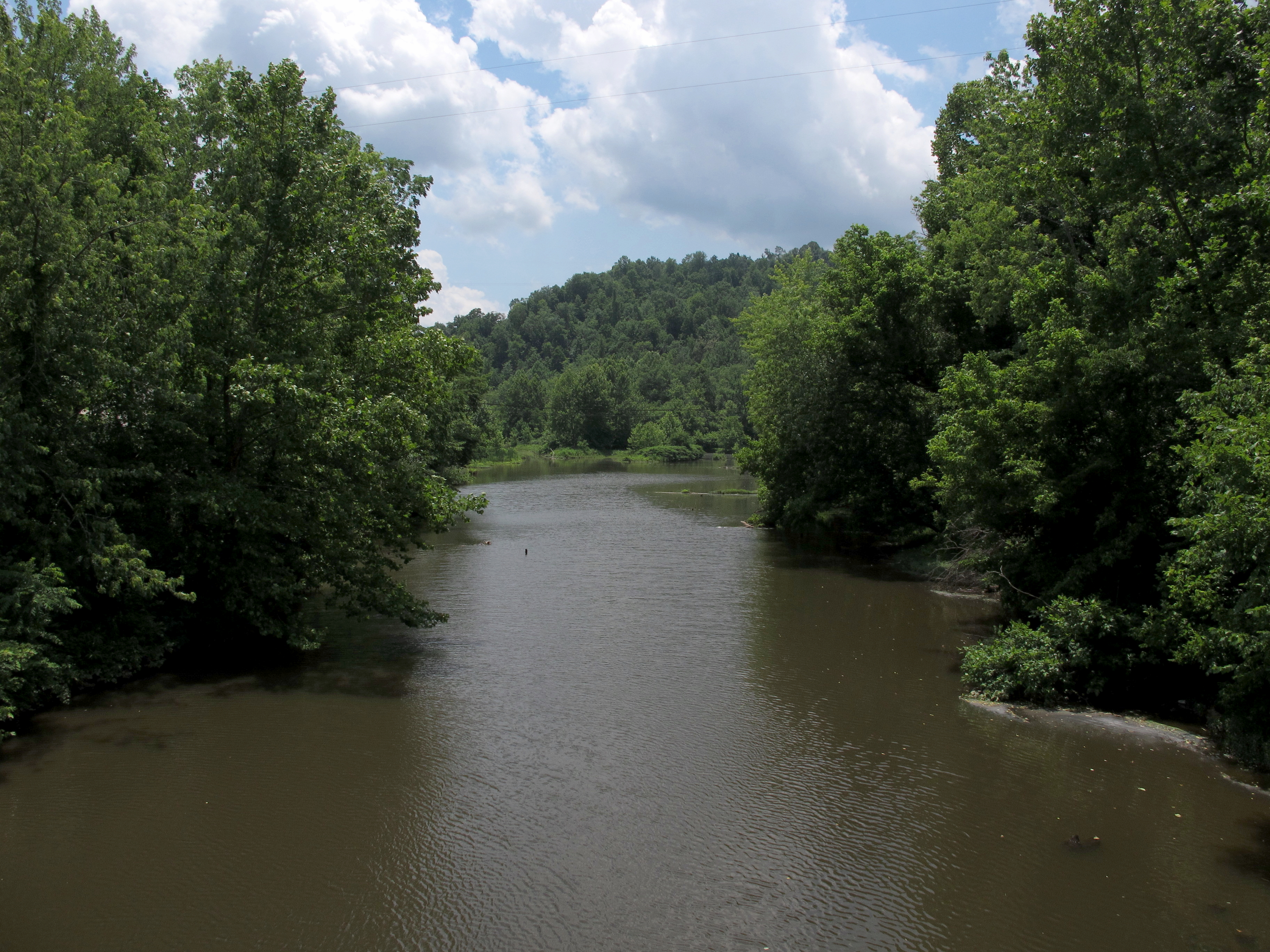
- McKim Creek near its mouth in Union Mills

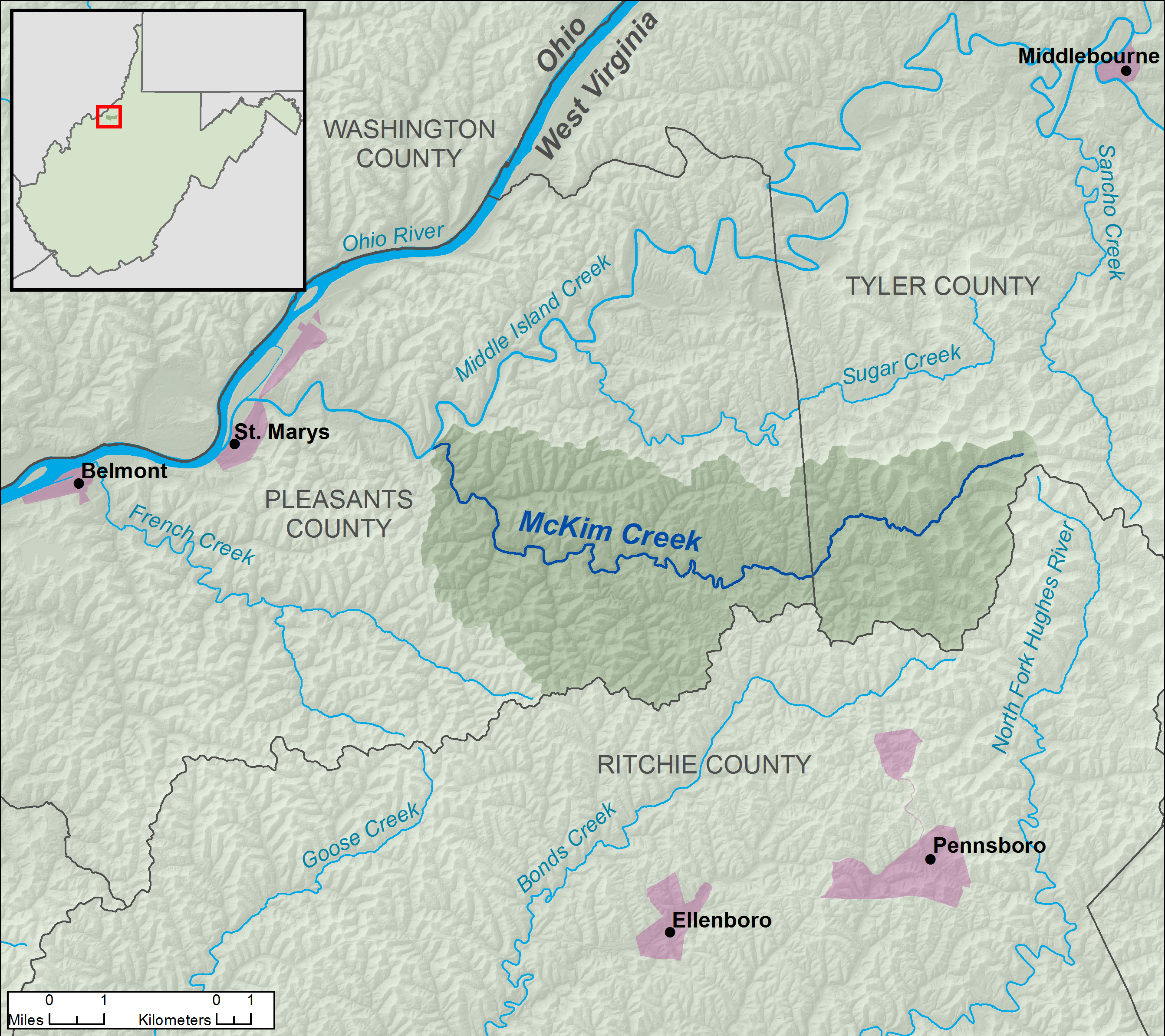
- A map of McKim Creek and its watershed

Location
- Country: United States
- State: West Virginia
- Counties: Tyler, Pleasants

Physical characteristics
- Source
  - location: near McKim, Tyler County
  - coordinates: 39.3909121°N 80.9359413°W
  - elevation: 990 ft (300 m)
- Mouth: Middle Island Creek
  - location: Union Mills, Pleasants County
  - coordinates: 39.3909094°N 81.1384453°W
  - elevation: 607 ft (185 m)
- Length: 20.4 mi (32.8 km)
- Basin size: 37.3 sq mi (97 km^{2})

Basin features
- Hydrologic Unit Code: 050302010508 (USGS)

McKim Creek is a tributary of Middle Island Creek, 20.4 miles (32.8 km) long, in northwestern West Virginia in the United States. Via Middle Island Creek and the Ohio River, it is part of the watershed of the Mississippi River, draining an area of 37.3 square miles (97 km^{2}) in a rural region on the unglaciated portion of the Allegheny Plateau.

McKim Creek rises just east of McKim in southwestern Tyler County and flows generally westward into eastern Pleasants County, through the unincorporated communities of McKim and Plum Run in Tyler County and Hebron in Pleasants County. It flows into Middle Island Creek at the community of Union Mills, 4.6 miles (7.4 km) upstream of Middle Island Creek's confluence with the Ohio River in St. Marys.

According to the Geographic Names Information System, McKim Creek has also been known historically by the name "McKim's Fork."

== See also ==
- List of rivers of West Virginia
