= Billy Greenhorn =

American poet

Billy Greenhorn (1937–1995) is the pseudonym of the American poet Bob Snyder.

Snyder was born on February 3, 1937, in St. Marys, West Virginia, and died in 1995.

Snyder wrote for the Soupbeans Poetry Collective with contributions in the Soupbean series "What's a Nice Hillbilly Like You..." He also wrote We'll See Who's a Peasant: Poems of Love and Family, printed by the Appalachian Press in 1977.

He was also director of the Southern Appalachian Circuit, a branch of Antioch College in Huntington, West Virginia. In 1973 the school changed its name to Antioch Appalachia and moved to Beckley, West Virginia.
