= Poynette, West Virginia =

Poynette
- Unincorporated community
- Location within the state of West Virginia Poynette (the United States)
- Coordinates: 39°20′2″N 81°8′9″W
- Country: United States
- State: West Virginia
- County: Pleasants
- Elevation: 768 ft (234 m)
- Time zone: UTC-5 (Eastern (EST))
  - Summer (DST): UTC-4 (EDT)
- GNIS ID: 1678566

Poynette is an unincorporated community in Pleasants County, West Virginia, United States.
