= Vaucluse, West Virginia =

Vaucluse
- Unincorporated community
- Location within the state of West Virginia Vaucluse (the United States)
- Coordinates: 39°23′5″N 81°13′53″W
- Country: United States
- State: West Virginia
- County: Pleasants
- Elevation: 636 ft (194 m)
- Time zone: UTC-5 (Eastern (EST))
  - Summer (DST): UTC-4 (EDT)
- GNIS ID: 1555881

Vaucluse is an unincorporated community in Pleasants County, West Virginia, United States.

The community was named after Vaucluse, in France.
