= Frances Dana Barker Gage =

American writer (1808–1884)

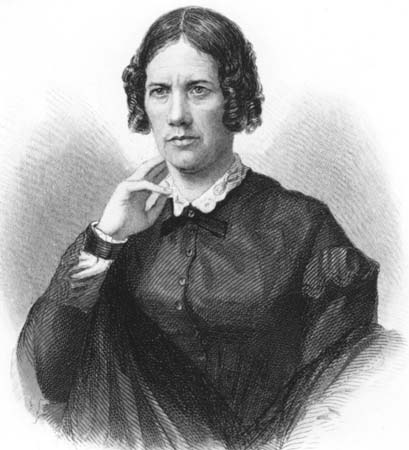
- Engraving of Frances Gage
- Born: October 12, 1808; Washington County, Ohio, U.S.
- Died: November 10, 1884 (aged 76); Greenwich, Connecticut, U.S.
- Occupations: Writer, poet, activist, abolitionist
- Spouse: James L. Gage (m. 1829; died 1863)

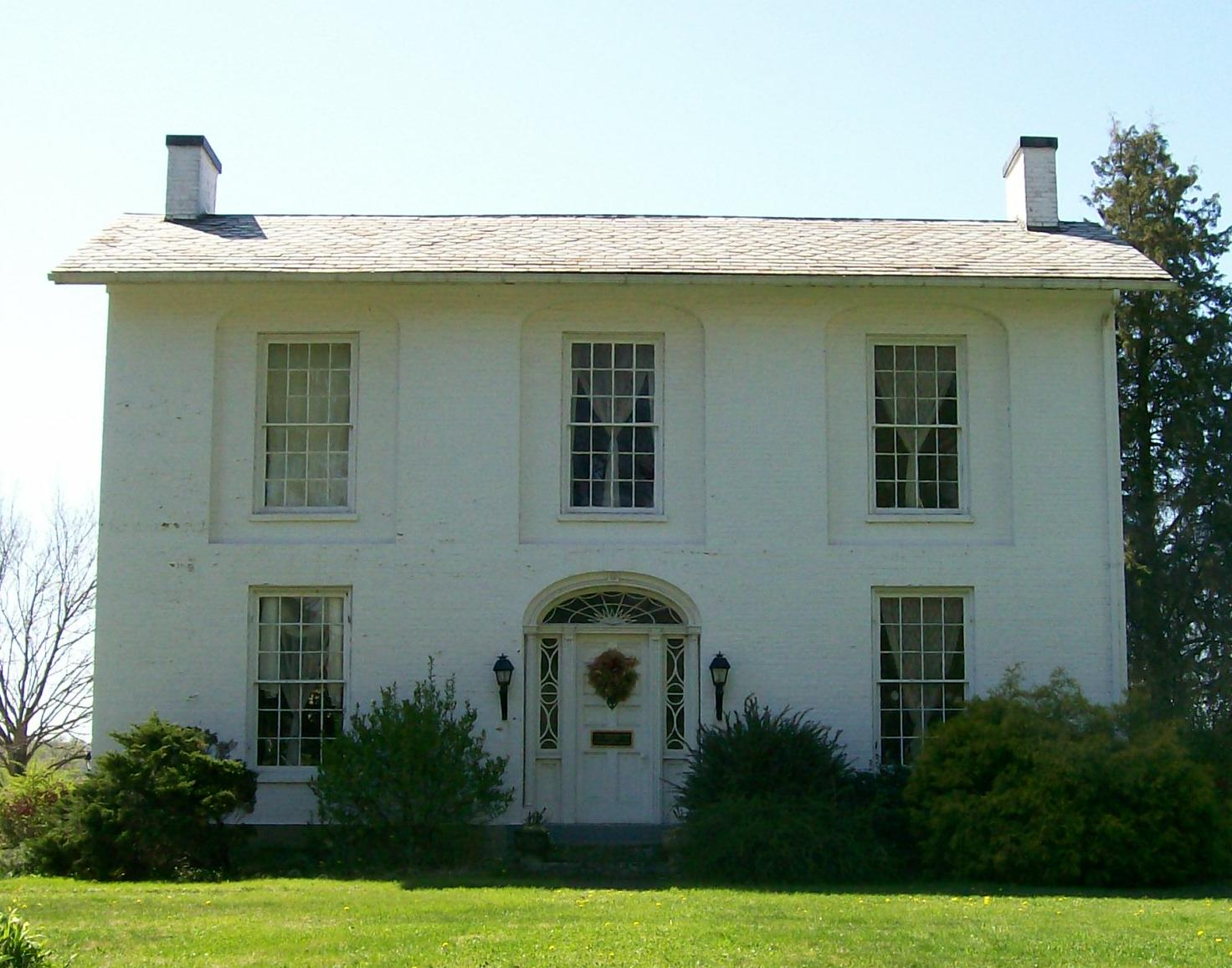
The Colonel Joseph Barker House in April 2010. It is the house in which Gage grew up.

Frances Dana Barker Gage (pen name, Aunt Fanny; October 12, 1808 – November 10, 1884) was a leading American reformer, feminist and abolitionist. She worked closely with Susan B. Anthony and Elizabeth Cady Stanton, along with other leaders of the early women's rights movement in the United States. She was among the first to champion voting rights for all citizens without regard to race or gender and was a particularly outspoken supporter of giving newly freed African American women the franchise during Reconstruction, along with African American men who had formerly been slaves.

== Early life and education ==
Frances Dana Barker was born near Marietta, Ohio on October 12, 1808, the daughter of farmers Elizabeth Dana (1771–1835) and Col. Joseph Barker (1765–1843); her family's house is still in existence and has been designated a historic site. Frances was the tenth of eleven children. In 1788 the Barkers left New Hampshire and crossed the Alleghenies with Rufus Putnam, and were among the first settlers in the United States Northwest Territory. On January 1, 1829, she married James L. Gage (1800–1863), an abolitionist lawyer from McConnelsville, Ohio. He was a Universalist and a friend of the evangelist Stephen R. Smith. Traveling Universalist preachers, like George Rogers and Nathaniel Stacy, often stayed in the Gage household.

== Career ==
=== Activism ===
Gage wrote that her woman suffrage work began when she was ten years old, in 1818. She recalled an incident in which she helped to make a barrel and was reprimanded by her father. As she returned to her place, she heard her father lament to the cooper, "What a pity she was not a boy!" Gage wrote that this was a turning point for her, the incident bringing up hatred to the limitations of sex and laying the foundation for her later activism.

Though Gage was inspired at an early age, she did not begin her activist work until after 1848. In 1850, she held a convention in McConnelsville, Ohio, which seventy people attended. Those at the convention fought to have race and gender removed from requirements for state citizenship and voting rights in the Ohio Constitution. Their work was not successful.

She was an activist in the temperance, anti-slavery, and woman's-rights movements, and in 1851 presided over a woman's-rights convention in Akron, Ohio, where her opening speech introducing Sojourner Truth attracted much attention. Twelve years later, in 1863, Gage recorded her recollection of Truth's speech, "Ain't I a Woman?." Gage's version notably differs from 1851 accounts, lengthening the speech, adding the oft-repeated "ain't I a woman" refrain, and rendering it in a minstrel-like imitation of the speech of Southern slaves – speech patterns which Truth, having grown up in New York speaking Dutch, did not possess. Despite its dubious historicity and racist undertones, her version has become the standard text and account of that famous speech.

In 1853, she moved to St. Louis, Missouri, where she was often threatened with violence due to her anti-slavery views. Six months after moving to St. Louis, she was elected chair of the National Woman's Rights Convention in Cleveland in October. In 1857 she visited Cuba, Saint Thomas and Santo Domingo, and returned to write and lecture. Gage's radicalism had limited outlets in a slave state, such as Missouri. She and her family moved back to Columbus, Ohio in 1860. James' health was declining and the family had survived three mysterious fires, likely brought on by Frances' abolitionist views.

In 1860, Gage became editor of the Ladies Department for the Ohio Cultivator where she advocated for feminists and abolitionists. She also lobbied for an Ohio law for married women to have the same property rights as men, but she was unsuccessful.

When the American Civil War began she was employed by the Western Sanitary Commission; she traveled down the Mississippi River to help the injured in Vicksburg, Natchez and Memphis. From 1863 to 1864 she was the superintendent, under General Rufus Saxton, in charge of Parris Island, South Carolina, a refuge for over 500 freed slaves. While there she met and became friends with nurse Clara Barton, who was working nearby. They compared their childhoods, and discussed Universalism and literature. Gage joined the American Equal Rights Association in 1863 as a paid lobbyist and writer.

Although in 1865 she was crippled when her carriage overturned in Galesburg, Illinois, she continued to lecture. Her addresses covered her "triune cause": first, abolition; second, women's rights; and third, temperance. The women's rights leaders and friends like Elizabeth Cady Stanton, Susan B. Anthony, Amelia Bloomer, Lucy Stone and Antoinette Brown encouraged Gage to be the women's rights emissary in America's midwest. Her lecture circuit included Illinois, Indiana, Iowa, Massachusetts, Missouri, Nebraska, New York, Ohio and Pennsylvania, Louisiana, Mississippi, and Tennessee. In 1867 she spoke at the First Anniversary of the American Equal Rights Association.

When we hold the ballot, we shall stand just there. Men will forget to tell us that politics are degrading. They will bow low, and actually respect the women to whom they now talk platitudes; and silly flatteries, sparkling eyes, rosy cheeks, pearly teeth, ruby lips, the soft and delicate hands of refinement and beauty, will not be the burden of their song; but the strength, the power, the energy, the force, the intellect and the nerve, which the womanhood of this country will bring to bear, and which will infuse itself through all the ranks of society, must make all its men and women wiser and better.

=== Publications ===
Gage wrote children's books and poems, under the pen name of "Aunt Fanny." Her books include Fanny at School, Fanny's Birthday, and Fanny's Journey. She wrote for The Ohio Cultivator and other regional journals; she portrayed herself as a warm, domestic persona who offered advice and guidance to isolated housewives in Ohio. She wrote essays, letters, poetry, and novels. Among the other publications to which she contributed were the Western Literary Magazine, New York's Independent, Missouri Democrat, Cincinnati's The Ladies' Repository, Field Notes, and The National Anti-Slavery Standard, as well as being an early contributor to the Saturday Review. Gage published Poems (1867); Elsie Magoon, or the Old Still-House in the Hollow: A Tale of the Past (1872); Steps Upward (1873); and Gertie's Sacrifice, or Glimpses of Two Lives (1869). "A Hundred Years Hence" was a hymn composed by Gage and first sung in 1875.

Oppression and war will be heard of no more
Nor the blood of a slave leave his print on our shore,
Conventions will then be a useless expense,
For we'll all go free suffrage, a hundred years hence.

== Personal life ==
She did not practice her religion all her life.

There came a time when Universalists refused to go with me as an abolitionist, an advocate for the rights of women, for earnest temperance pleaders," she wrote late in life. "Then it came to me that Christ's death as an atonement for sinners was not truth, but he had died for what he believed to be truth. Then came the war, then trouble, then paralysis, and for 14 years I have not listened to a sermon because I am too great a cripple. I have read much, thought much, and feel that life is too precious to be given to doctrines.

Frances married James L. Gage on New Year's Day in 1829. Throughout their marriage of 34 years, James supported Frances' commitment to help others. They raised eight children. Four of their sons fought for the Union Army during the American Civil War. In the autumn of 1862, Frances and her daughter Mary traveled to the Sea Islands in South Carolina to train ex-slaves. In 1863, James Gage became critically ill and died in Columbus, Ohio. Frances Gage suffered a debilitating stroke in 1867. She died in Greenwich, Connecticut on November 10, 1884.

== Selected works ==
=== Aunt Fanny series ===
- Fanny at School
- Fanny's Birthday
- Fanny's Journey

=== Other fiction ===
- Elsie Magoon, or the Old Still-House in the Hollow: A Tale of the Past (1872)
- Steps Upward (1873)
- Gertie's Sacrifice, or Glimpses of Two Lives (1869)

=== Poetry ===
- Poems (1867)

=== Hymns ===
- "A Hundred Years Hence"
