= Boaz, West Virginia =

- CDP
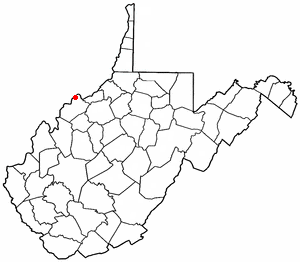
- Location of Boaz, West Virginia
- Coordinates: 39°22′25″N 81°29′44″W
- Country: United States
- State: West Virginia
- County: Wood

Area
  - Total: 4.5 sq mi (11.7 km^{2})
  - Land: 3.7 sq mi (9.6 km^{2})
  - Water: 0.81 sq mi (2.1 km^{2})
- Elevation: 663 ft (202 m)

Population (2020)
  - Total: 1,321
  - Density: 360/sq mi (140/km^{2})
- Time zone: UTC-5 (Eastern (EST))
  - Summer (DST): UTC-4 (EDT)
- Area code: 304
- FIPS code: 54-08836
- GNIS feature ID: 2389222

Boaz is a census-designated place (CDP) in Wood County, West Virginia, United States. It is part of the Parkersburg-Marietta-Vienna metropolitan area. As of the 2020 census, the CDP population was 1,321.

The community was named in 1878 by the United States Post Office Department, which selected from three names suggested by a resident named William Johnson: "Johnson," "Ruth," and "Boaz."

== Geography ==
Boaz is located along the Ohio River.

According to the United States Census Bureau, the CDP has a total area of 4.5 square miles (11.7 km^{2}), of which 3.7 square miles (9.6 km^{2}) is land and 0.8 square mile (2.1 km^{2}) (18.10%) is water. Boaz is bordered to the north on WV Route 14 by Williamstown, WV. The CDP is approximately 9 miles north of Parkersburg, WV.

Boaz has several unknown Indian mounds that have been protected by the residents of Boaz since they were discovered in 1895.

== Demographics ==
As of the census of 2000, there were 1,345 people, 534 households, and 412 families residing in the CDP. The population density was 362.5 people per square mile (140.0/km^{2}). There were 554 housing units at an average density of 149.3/sq mi (57.7/km^{2}). The racial makeup of the CDP was 98.74% White, 0.52% African American, 0.52% Native American, 0.07% from other races, and 0.15% from two or more races.

There were 534 households, out of which 33.9% had children under the age of 18 living with them, 63.5% were married couples living together, 11.6% had a female householder with no husband present, and 22.8% were non-families. 19.7% of all households were made up of individuals, and 10.7% had someone living alone who was 65 years of age or older. The average household size was 2.50 and the average family size was 2.85.

In the CDP, the population was spread out, with 23.8% under the age of 18, 7.7% from 18 to 24, 26.5% from 25 to 44, 28.0% from 45 to 64, and 14.0% who were 65 years of age or older. The median age was 39 years. For every 100 females, there were 91.1 males. For every 100 females age 18 and over, there were 87.0 males.

The median income for a household in the CDP was $39,250, and the median income for a family was $49,474. Males had a median income of $33,393 versus $24,605 for females. The per capita income for the CDP was $20,405. About 4.7% of families and 7.3% of the population were below the poverty line, including 15.0% of those under age 18 and 4.9% of those age 65 or over.

As of the 2020 US Census, there were 1,321 people, 581 households living in Boaz. An increase from the 2010 census of 1,297.

The Median Household Income was $77,750. 23.5% of residents had earned a Bachelor's Degree or higher.

== Climate ==
The climate in this area is characterized by relatively high temperatures and evenly distributed precipitation throughout the year. According to the Köppen Climate Classification system, Boaz has a Humid subtropical climate, abbreviated "Cfa" on climate maps.

Climate data for Boaz,_West_Virginia
Month	Jan	Feb	Mar	Apr	May	Jun	Jul	Aug	Sep	Oct	Nov	Dec	Year
Mean daily maximum °C (°F)	3 (37)	5 (41)	12 (53)	18 (64)	23 (73)	27 (80)	29 (84)	28 (82)	24 (75)	18 (64)	12 (53)	6 (42)	17 (62)
Mean daily minimum °C (°F)	−5 (23)	−4 (24)	0 (32)	5 (41)	10 (50)	15 (59)	18 (64)	17 (62)	13 (55)	6 (42)	2 (35)	−2 (28)	6 (42)
Average precipitation mm (inches)	66 (2.6)	64 (2.5)	100 (4.1)	86 (3.4)	97 (3.8)	97 (3.8)	110 (4.2)	110 (4.3)	81 (3.2)	74 (2.9)	84 (3.3)	81 (3.2)	1,050 (41.3)
Source: Weatherbase

== See also ==
- List of cities and towns along the Ohio River
