= McKim, West Virginia =

McKim
- Unincorporated community
- Location within the state of West Virginia McKim (the United States)
- Coordinates: 39°22′48″N 80°57′38″W
- Country: United States
- State: West Virginia
- County: Tyler
- Elevation: 830 ft (250 m)
- Time zone: UTC-5 (Eastern (EST))
  - Summer (DST): UTC-4 (EDT)
- GNIS ID: 1549814

McKim is an unincorporated community in Tyler County, West Virginia, United States, along McKim Creek. Its post office is closed.
