= Plum Run, West Virginia =

Plum Run
- Unincorporated community
- Location within the state of West Virginia Plum Run (the United States)
- Coordinates: 39°22′29″N 80°59′58″W
- Country: United States
- State: West Virginia
- County: Tyler
- Elevation: 797 ft (243 m)
- Time zone: UTC-5 (Eastern (EST))
  - Summer (DST): UTC-4 (EDT)
- GNIS ID: 1555378

Plum Run is an unincorporated community in Tyler County, West Virginia, United States, along McKim Creek. It was also known as Plum. The Plum post office is closed.
