= Newport, Washington County, Ohio =

Newport, Ohio
- CDP
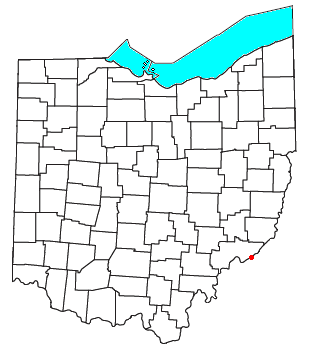
- Location of Newport, Washington County, Ohio
- Coordinates: 39°23′48″N 81°13′29″W
- Country: United States
- State: Ohio
- County: Washington
- Township: Newport
- Elevation: 742 ft (226 m)

Population (2020)
  - Total: 895
- Time zone: UTC-5 (Eastern (EST))
  - Summer (DST): UTC-4 (EDT)
- ZIP code: 45768
- Area code: 740
- GNIS feature ID: 2628944

Newport is a census-designated place in eastern Newport Township, Washington County, Ohio, United States. It has a post office with the ZIP code 45768. Newport lies along the Ohio River several miles above the county seat of Marietta. Today its main street is designated as State Route 7. The population of the CDP was 895 at the 2020 census.

Newport is the location of the Carpenter Bridge, which carries State Route 807 over the Ohio River.

== Geography ==
=== Climate ===
Climate data for Newport, Washington County, Ohio (1991–2020)
Month	Jan	Feb	Mar	Apr	May	Jun	Jul	Aug	Sep	Oct	Nov	Dec	Year
Mean daily maximum °F (°C)	39.4 (4.1)	43.2 (6.2)	52.8 (11.6)	65.9 (18.8)	74.0 (23.3)	81.2 (27.3)	84.3 (29.1)	83.5 (28.6)	77.9 (25.5)	66.6 (19.2)	54.2 (12.3)	43.9 (6.6)	63.9 (17.7)
Daily mean °F (°C)	30.5 (−0.8)	33.1 (0.6)	41.3 (5.2)	52.7 (11.5)	62.1 (16.7)	70.2 (21.2)	74.0 (23.3)	72.9 (22.7)	66.5 (19.2)	54.9 (12.7)	43.4 (6.3)	35.2 (1.8)	53.1 (11.7)
Mean daily minimum °F (°C)	21.6 (−5.8)	23.1 (−4.9)	29.8 (−1.2)	39.5 (4.2)	50.2 (10.1)	59.2 (15.1)	63.7 (17.6)	62.3 (16.8)	55.1 (12.8)	43.2 (6.2)	32.5 (0.3)	26.5 (−3.1)	42.2 (5.7)
Average precipitation inches (mm)	3.50 (89)	3.21 (82)	3.97 (101)	3.70 (94)	4.67 (119)	4.69 (119)	4.86 (123)	4.18 (106)	3.30 (84)	2.89 (73)	2.85 (72)	3.58 (91)	45.4 (1,153)
Average snowfall inches (cm)	8.9 (23)	7.0 (18)	3.9 (9.9)	0.1 (0.25)	0.0 (0.0)	0.0 (0.0)	0.0 (0.0)	0.0 (0.0)	0.0 (0.0)	0.0 (0.0)	0.3 (0.76)	3.6 (9.1)	23.8 (61.01)
Source: NOAA

== Demographics ==
As of the census of 2010, there were 1003 people, 399 households, and 296 families residing in the town. The racial makeup of the town was 98.8% White, 0.6% Asian, 0.1% Native American, and 0.5% from two or more races. Hispanic or Latino of any race were 0.4% of the population.

There were 399 households, of which 23.3% had children under the age of 18 living with them, 61.9% were married couples living together, 8.5% had a female householder with no husband present, 3.8% had a male householder with no wife present, and 25.8% were non-families. 22.3% of all households were made up of individuals, and 11.5% had someone living alone who was 65 years of age or older. The average household size was 2.51 and the average family size was 2.92.

The median age in the town was 42 years. The gender makeup of the town was 48.6% male and 51.4% female.

== History ==
The first European-American settlement at Newport was made as early as 1798, as settlers from Massachusetts were the first to make their home. However, the site was not platted until 1839. A post office called Newport has been in operation since 1815.

A short distance southwest of Newport on what is now SR7 is the Judge Joseph Barker House. Built in 1832, it is listed on the National Register of Historic Places.

== Education ==
It is in the Frontier Local School District.
