= Judge Joseph Barker House =

Historic house in Ohio, United States

- Judge Joseph Barker Jr. House
- U.S. National Register of Historic Places
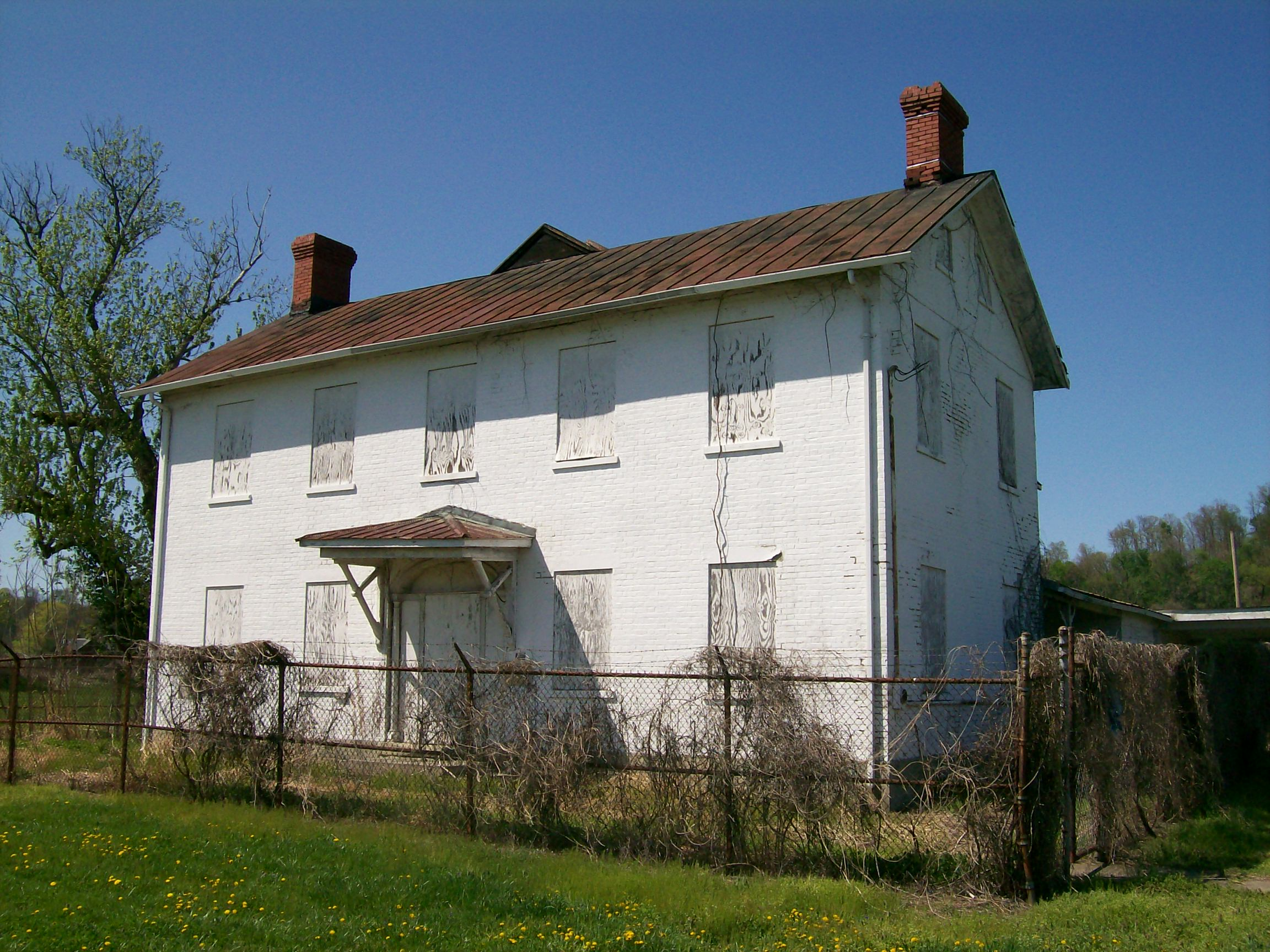
- Front of the house

- Location within Ohio Location within the United States
- Location: State Route 7
- Nearest city: Newport, Ohio
- Coordinates: 39°21′29″N 81°19′45″W
- Area: Less than 1 acre (0.40 ha)
- Built: 1832
- Architect: Col. Joseph Barker
- NRHP reference No.: 79001979
- Added to NRHP: July 26, 1979

The Judge Joseph Barker House is a historic residence in southern Washington County, Ohio, United States. Located along State Route 7 southwest of the community of Newport, it is a brick structure with a roof of metal, a foundation of sandstone, and other elements of wood and metal. Constructed in 1832, it is a two-story rectangular building that sits atop an Ohio River bluff. Its floor plan is five bays wide, featuring a central entrance with a fanlight and sidelights.

The house was built as the home of Joseph Barker Jr., whose parents moved to the newly founded village of Marietta in 1789. As a skilled builder of both buildings and ships, his father Joseph was a leading member of local society. Although the family spent some time living in Marietta during the Northwest Indian War and during a winter after their farm was destroyed by fire, they typically lived on a property several miles up the Muskingum River from its mouth at Marietta. Like his father, who held the office from 1830 to 1842, the younger Barker served on the Washington County Court of Common Pleas during the middle of the nineteenth century, only leaving office because of his death. Before this time, he had served in the Ohio General Assembly in the early 1830s.

Judge Barker's home was constructed by his father Joseph, a colonel in the Ohio militia; although Colonel Barker built many prominent houses throughout Washington County, very few survive to the present day. For this reason, Judge Barker's house is among the most significant of the county's historic buildings. In 1979, the Judge Joseph Barker House was listed on the National Register of Historic Places. Qualifying it for this distinction were its historically significant architecture and its association with the elder Barker. It is one of thirty-five Washington County places to be listed on the Register; among the other thirty-four is the home of the judge's father, which lies along Masonic Home Road north of Marietta. It is no longer a residence, having been converted into a government office under the ownership of the Army Corps of Engineers by the late 1970s.
