= Muskingum Township, Washington County, Ohio =

Township in Ohio, US

- Township
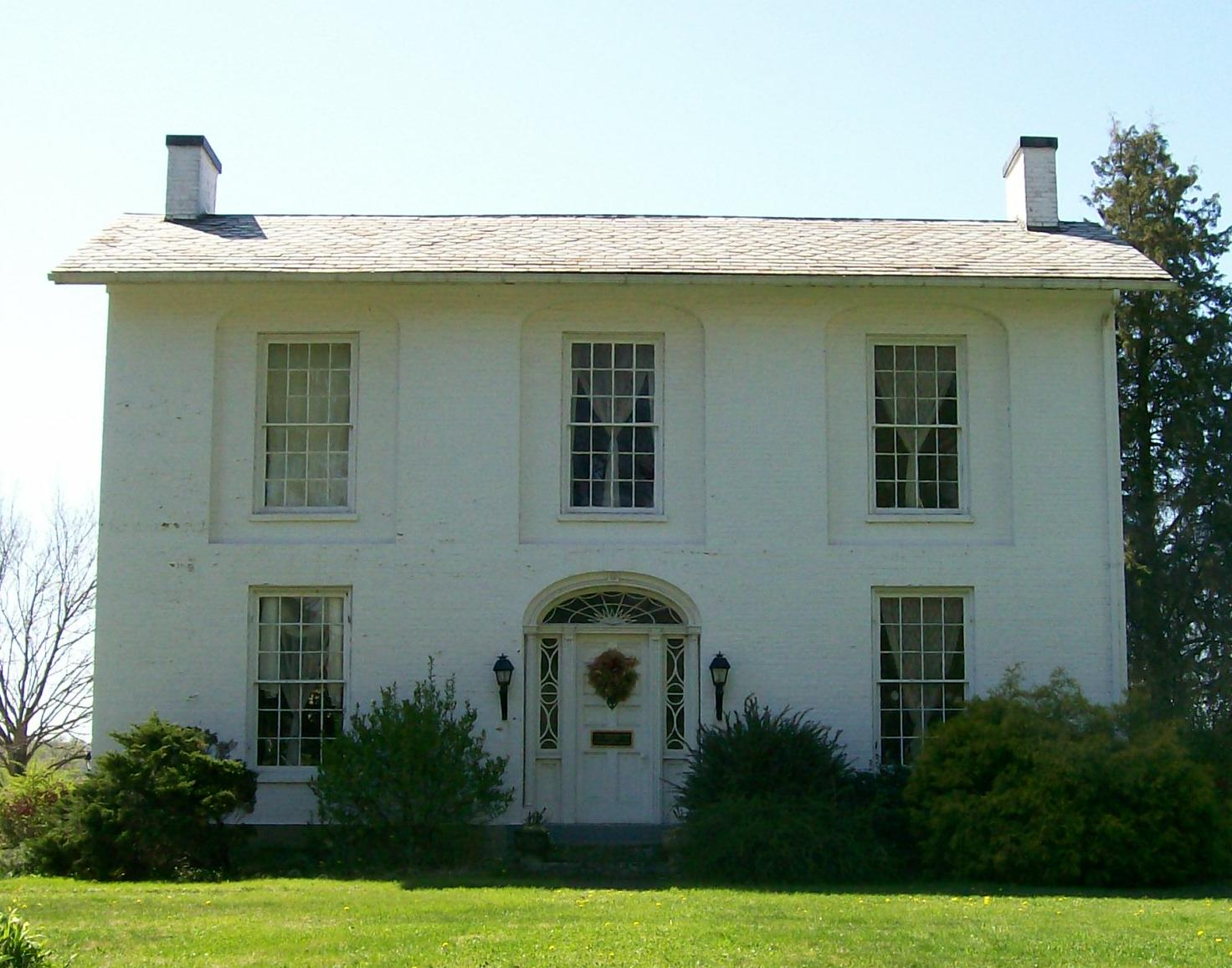
- Colonel Joseph Barker House, built 1811

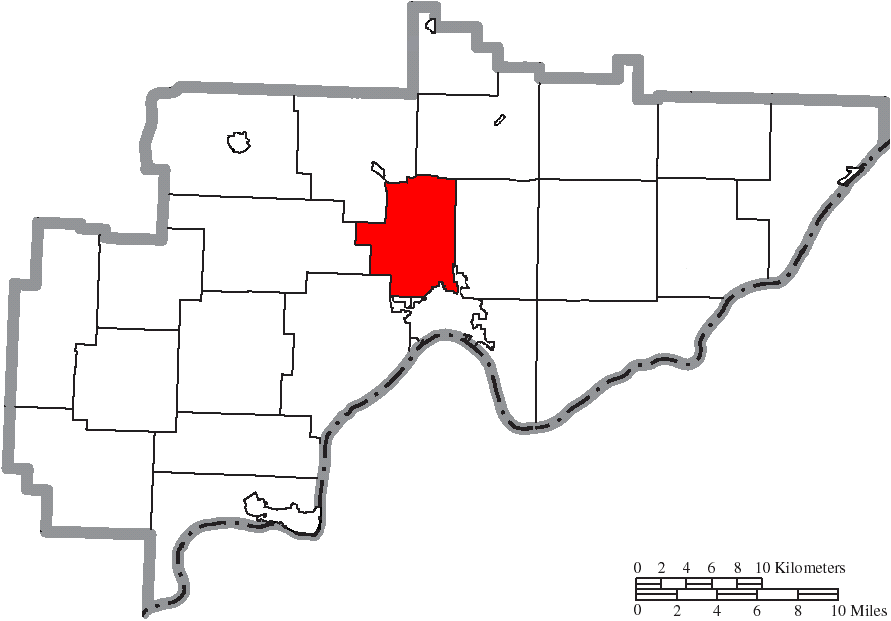
- Location of Muskingum Township in Washington County
- Coordinates: 39°28′30″N 81°28′27″W
- Country: United States
- State: Ohio
- County: Washington

Area
  - Total: 22.2 sq mi (57.4 km^{2})
  - Land: 21.4 sq mi (55.3 km^{2})
  - Water: 0.81 sq mi (2.1 km^{2})
- Elevation: 620 ft (189 m)

Population (2020)
  - Total: 4,424
  - Density: 210/sq mi (80/km^{2})
- Time zone: UTC-5 (Eastern (EST))
  - Summer (DST): UTC-4 (EDT)
- FIPS code: 39-53452
- GNIS feature ID: 1087140
- Website: https://muskingumtwp.org/

Muskingum Township is one of the twenty-two townships of Washington County, Ohio, United States. The 2020 census found 4,424 people in the township.

== Geography ==
Located in the central part of the county, it borders the following townships:

- Salem Township - north
- Fearing Township - east
- Marietta Township - south
- Warren Township - southwest
- Watertown Township - west
- Adams Township - northwest

Small portions of the county seat of Marietta are located in southern Muskingum Township, and much of the central part of the township is occupied by the census-designated place of Devola.

== Name and history ==
The name Muskingum may come from the Shawnee word mshkikwam 'swampy ground'. The name may also be from Lenape "Machkigen," referring to thorns, or a specific species of thorn bush. Muskingum has also been taken to mean 'elk's eye' (mus wəshkinkw) by folk etymology, as in mus 'elk' + wəshkinkw 'its eye'. Moravian missionary David Zeisberger wrote that the Muskingum River was called Elk's Eye "because of the numbers of elk that formerly fed on its banks."

Statewide, the only other Muskingum Township is located in Muskingum County.

== Government ==
The township is governed by a three-member board of trustees, who are elected in November of odd-numbered years to a four-year term beginning on the following January 1. Two are elected in the year after the presidential election and one is elected in the year before it. There is also an elected township fiscal officer, who serves a four-year term beginning on April 1 of the year after the election, which is held in November of the year before the presidential election. Vacancies in the fiscal officership or on the board of trustees are filled by the remaining trustees.
