= USS Arvilla =

Patrol vessel of the United States Navy

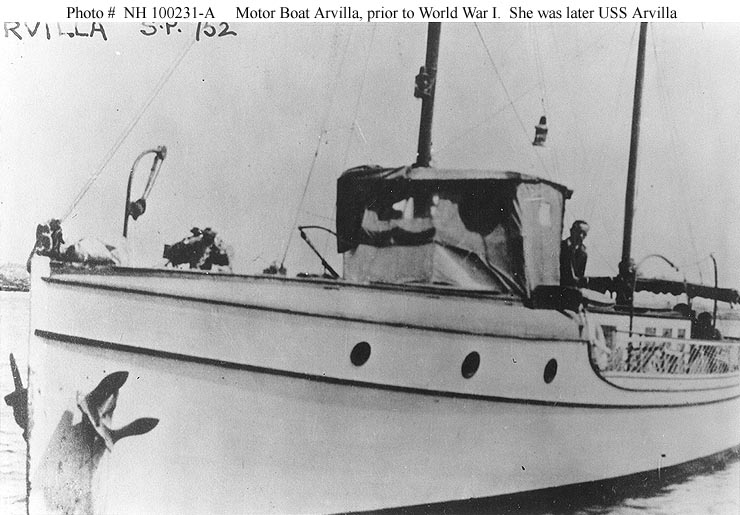
- Arvilla as a private motorboat sometime prior to her United States Navy service.

History

United States
- Name: USS Arvilla
- Namesake: Previous name retained
- Builder: Joe Fellows, Wilmington, Delaware
- Acquired: 24 June 1917
- Commissioned: 5 May 1917
- Decommissioned: January 1919
- Stricken: 12 March 1919
- Fate: Returned to owner 12 March 1919
- Notes: Operated as private motorboat Arvilla until 1917 and from 1919

General characteristics
- Type: Patrol vessel
- Tonnage: 11 Gross register tons
- Length: 46 ft 0 in (14.02 m)
- Beam: 10 ft 6 in (3.20 m)
- Draft: 3 ft 6 in (1.07 m)
- Speed: 12 miles per hour
- Complement: 7
- Armament: 1 × 1-pounder gun; 1 × machine gun

USS Arvilla (SP-752) was a United States Navy patrol vessel in commission from 1917 to 1919.

Arvilla was built as a private motorboat of the same name by Joe Fellows at Wilmington, Delaware. In 1917, the U.S. Navy acquired her under a free lease from her owner, Harry Fisher of San Diego, California, for use as a section patrol boat during World War I. She was commissioned on 5 May 1917 as USS Arvilla (SP-752), although the Navy did not actually take possession of her from Fisher until 24 June 1917.

Assigned to the 12th Naval District, Arvilla was tasked with patrol duties in San Diego Harbor and environs. While patrolling on 2 August 1917, she sank after the fishing vessel Higo accidentally rammed her. Raised and repaired, she returned to her patrol duties, which she carried out for the remainder of World War I.

Arvilla was decommissioned in January 1919. She was stricken from the Navy List on 12 March 1919 and returned to Fisher the same day.
