= Anne M. McKim =

Scottish-New Zealand academic

- Born: Glasgow, Scotland
- Education: University of Edinburgh
- Scientific career
- Thesis: The Bruce: a study of John Barbour's heroic deal (1979)

Anne M. McKim is a Scottish-New Zealand academic. She is currently Professor of English at the University of Waikato, with specialities including Medieval Studies and Eighteenth-Century Literature.

== Selected works ==
- Cowie, Bronwen, Rosemary Hipkins, Sally Boyd, Ally Bull, Paul Ashley Keown, Clive McGee, Beverley Cooper et al. "Curriculum implementation exploratory studies." (2009).
- Petrie, Kirsten Culhane, Alister Jones, and Anne M. McKim. "Effective professional learning in physical activity." (2007).
