= Hebron, Pleasants County, West Virginia =

Hebron
- Unincorporated community
- Location within the state of West Virginia Hebron (the United States)
- Coordinates: 39°21′36″N 81°1′5″W
- Country: United States
- State: West Virginia
- County: Pleasants
- Time zone: UTC-5 (Eastern (EST))
  - Summer (DST): UTC-4 (EDT)
- GNIS feature ID: 1540112

Hebron is an unincorporated community in Pleasants County, West Virginia, United States, along McKim Creek.

The community most likely was named after the ancient city of Hebron.
