= Calcutta, West Virginia =

Unincorporated community in West Virginia, United States

Calcutta
- Unincorporated community
- Location within the state of West Virginia Calcutta (the United States)
- Coordinates: 39°21′2″N 81°11′40″W
- Country: United States
- State: West Virginia
- County: Pleasants
- Time zone: UTC-5 (Eastern (EST))
  - Summer (DST): UTC-4 (EDT)
- GNIS feature ID: 1536855

Calcutta is an unincorporated community in Pleasants County, West Virginia, United States. It is named after the city of Calcutta (now Kolkata, former capital of British India) in India.
