= Arvilla, West Virginia =

Unincorporated community in West Virginia, United States

Arvilla
- Unincorporated community
- Location within the state of West Virginia Arvilla (the United States)
- Coordinates: 39°26′7″N 81°4′15″W
- Country: United States
- State: West Virginia
- County: Pleasants
- Elevation: 620 ft (190 m)
- Time zone: UTC-5 (Eastern (EST))
  - Summer (DST): UTC-4 (EDT)
- GNIS ID: 1535034

Arvilla is an unincorporated community in Pleasants County, West Virginia, United States. The community's post office no longer exists.
