= Robert McKim =

Robert McKim may refer to:

- Robert McKim (actor) (1886–1927), American actor
- Robert McKim (Ontario politician) (1828–1900), Ontario farmer and political figure
- Robert McKim (philosopher) (1952–2024), philosopher of religion
- Robert McKim (Wyoming politician) (1946–2018), American politician, member of the Wyoming House of Representatives
