= Colonel Joseph Barker House =

Historic house in Ohio, United States

- Col. Joseph Barker House
- U.S. National Register of Historic Places
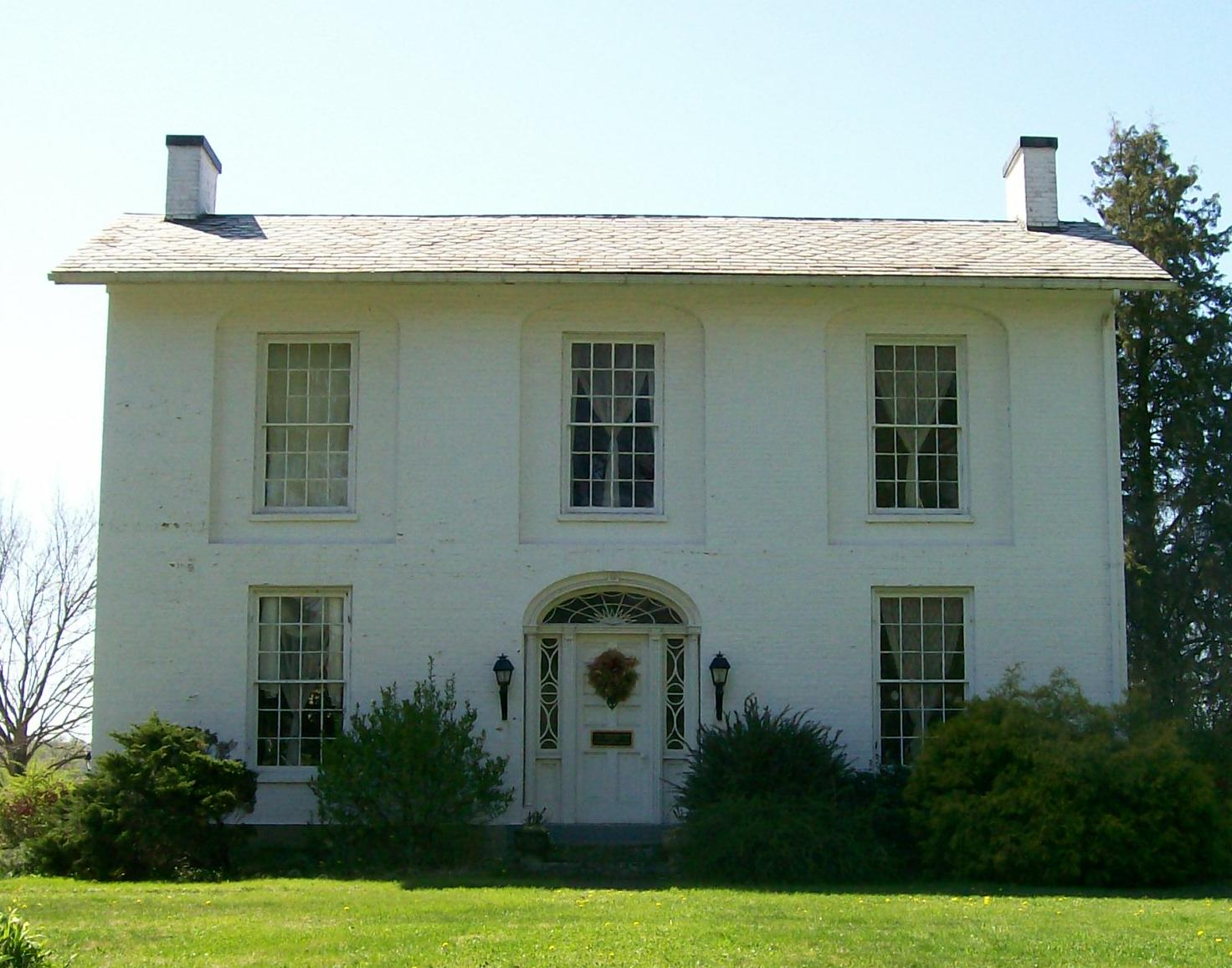
- Front of the house

- Location within Ohio Location within the United States
- Nearest city: Marietta, Ohio
- Coordinates: 39°29′11″N 81°29′19″W
- Area: 1.5 acres (0.61 ha)
- Built: 1811
- Architect: Col. Joseph Barker
- NRHP reference No.: 78002210
- Added to NRHP: June 23, 1978

The Colonel Joseph Barker House is a historic residence in Washington County, Ohio, United States. Located north of Marietta, in the Muskingum Township community of Devola, it has changed little since its construction in the early nineteenth century, and it has been designated a historic site.

== Barker's life ==
Born in Newmarket, New Hampshire in 1765, Joseph Barker moved his family to Ohio in 1789. After practicing carpentry in Marietta and serving in the militia during the Northwest Indian War, in 1795 he settled along the Muskingum River, about 7 miles (11 km) above Marietta. The family soon returned to that village, as their property and all of their stores were destroyed by fire in the following winter. Undaunted, they returned northward, becoming one of the first families to settle in Wiseman's Bottom along the river. Within a few years of settling in Ohio, Barker became a prominent member of local society: he was promoted to colonel of the militia during the war, was named a justice of the peace in 1799, and was elected to serve as the judge of Washington County's common pleas court from 1830 to 1842. Key to Barker's prominence in the community was his important skilled trade: besides being a carpenter, he was a capable architect and shipbuilder. Among the many ships that he built at his farm were some that were ultimately used for the Burr expedition.

Joseph Barker's daughter, Frances Dana Barker Gage, was a writer, and a leading American reformer, feminist and abolitionist. Barker's manuscript, Recollections, provides details of pioneer history regarding the first permanent American settlement of the new United States in the Northwest Territory.

== Architecture ==
Barker's house is a rectangular two-story structure completed in 1811. Measuring three bays wide, the facade features a central entrance with a large fanlight and sidelights flanking the doorway. All three windows on the facade's second story are placed within brick arches that are recessed into the wall of the house. Built of brick, the house rests on a foundation of sandstone and is covered with a slate roof. As one of Ohio's first master builders, Barker was responsible for constructing many prominent buildings in Marietta and vicinity; as the first such structure to be completed, the Barker House occupies a significant place in the architecture of the Marietta region. Contributing to its importance is its rarity and its unusually good state of preservation: few changes have been made to the house in the two centuries since its construction, and almost none of the other buildings designed by Barker have survived to the present day.

== Recognition ==
In 1978, the Colonel Joseph Barker House was listed on the National Register of Historic Places. Qualifying it for this distinction were its historically significant architecture and its association with Barker himself. It is one of thirty-five Washington County places to be listed on the Register; among the other thirty-four is the home of the colonel's son, Joseph Jr., which lies along State Route 7 above Marietta.
