= St. Marys, West Virginia =

City in West Virginia, US

- City
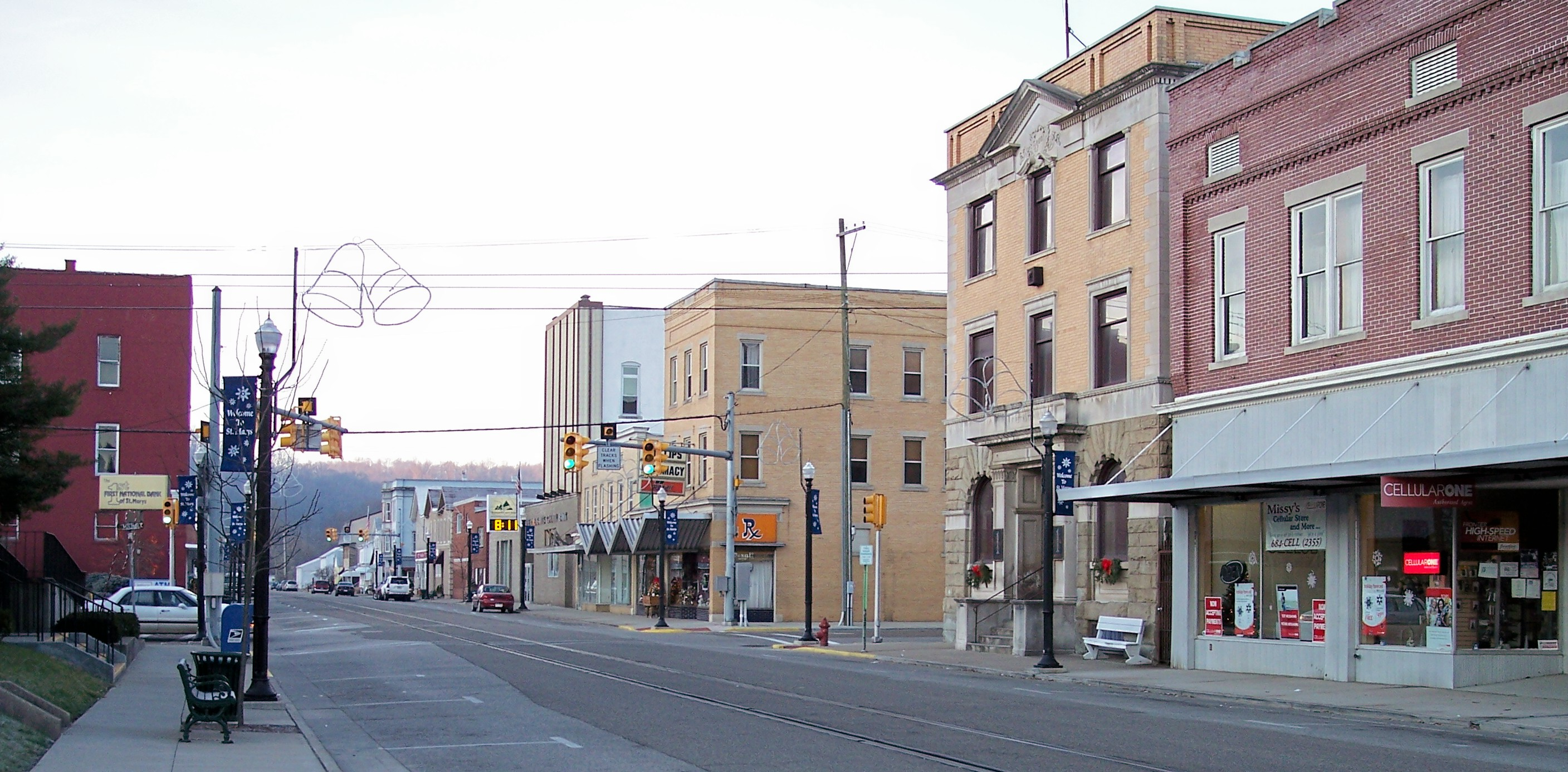
- 2nd Street in the central business district of St. Marys in 2006, with train tracks along the street
- Interactive map of St. Marys, West Virginia
- Location within West Virginia Location within the United States
- Coordinates: 39°23′28″N 81°12′11″W
- Country: United States
- State: West Virginia
- County: Pleasants
- Chartered: 1815
- Established: 1849

Area
  - Total: 1.03 sq mi (2.66 km^{2})
  - Land: 1.02 sq mi (2.65 km^{2})
  - Water: 0.0039 sq mi (0.01 km^{2})
- Elevation: 633 ft (193 m)

Population (2020)
  - Total: 1,831
  - Estimate (2021): 1,830
  - Density: 1,730.4/sq mi (668.12/km^{2})
- Time zone: UTC-5 (Eastern (EST))
  - Summer (DST): UTC-4 (EDT)
- ZIP Code: 26170
- Area code: 304
- FIPS code: 54-71356
- GNIS feature ID: 2390658
- Website: Official website

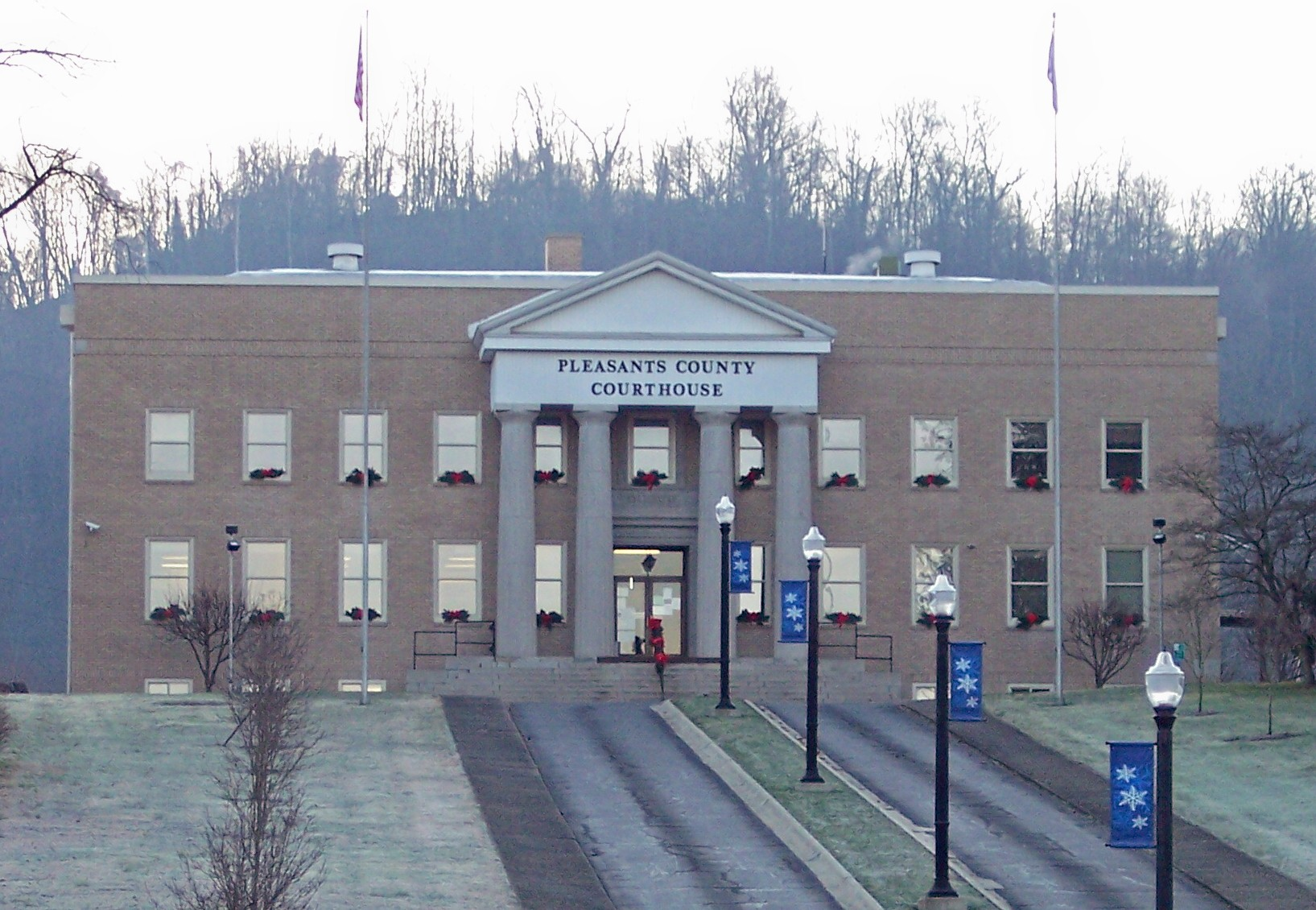
Pleasants County Courthouse

St. Marys is a city in and the county seat of Pleasants County, West Virginia, United States. The population was 1,847 at the 2020 census. It is part of the Parkersburg–Vienna metropolitan area. St. Marys was established in 1849 by Alexander Creel, who is said to have had a vision of Mary while passing the townsite by boat on the Ohio River.

Train tracks run down the middle of 2nd Street in St. Marys, and freight trains running through the middle of downtown St. Marys are a common sight. It is one of the few remaining towns in the United States where freight trains actually share city streets with automotive traffic.

== Geography ==
St. Marys is located along the Ohio River at the mouth of Middle Island Creek. Middle Island, which is part of the Ohio River Islands National Wildlife Refuge, is located in the Ohio River beside St. Marys; a bridge connects the city to the island.

According to the United States Census Bureau, the city has a total area of 1.02 square miles (2.64 km^{2}), all land.

== Demographics ==
Historical population
| Census | Pop. | Note | %± |
|---|---|---|---|
| 1880 | 350 | | — |
| 1890 | 520 | | 48.6% |
| 1900 | 825 | | 58.7% |
| 1910 | 1,358 | | 64.6% |
| 1920 | 1,648 | | 21.4% |
| 1930 | 2,182 | | 32.4% |
| 1940 | 2,201 | | 0.9% |
| 1950 | 2,196 | | −0.2% |
| 1960 | 2,443 | | 11.2% |
| 1970 | 2,348 | | −3.9% |
| 1980 | 2,219 | | −5.5% |
| 1990 | 2,148 | | −3.2% |
| 2000 | 2,017 | | −6.1% |
| 2010 | 1,860 | | −7.8% |
| 2020 | 1,831 | | −1.6% |
| 2021 (est.) | 1,830 | | −0.1% |
U.S. Decennial Census

=== 2020 census ===
As of the 2020 census, St. Marys had a population of 1,831. The median age was 41.8 years. 21.7% of residents were under the age of 18 and 21.8% of residents were 65 years of age or older. For every 100 females there were 94.8 males, and for every 100 females age 18 and over there were 87.3 males age 18 and over.

0.0% of residents lived in urban areas, while 100.0% lived in rural areas.

There were 799 households in St. Marys, of which 29.0% had children under the age of 18 living in them. Of all households, 45.2% were married-couple households, 16.5% were households with a male householder and no spouse or partner present, and 32.9% were households with a female householder and no spouse or partner present. About 33.8% of all households were made up of individuals and 17.1% had someone living alone who was 65 years of age or older.

There were 899 housing units, of which 11.1% were vacant. The homeowner vacancy rate was 2.8% and the rental vacancy rate was 5.4%.

Racial composition as of the 2020 census
| Race | Number | Percent |
|---|---|---|
| White | 1,749 | 95.5% |
| Black or African American | 6 | 0.3% |
| American Indian and Alaska Native | 8 | 0.4% |
| Asian | 5 | 0.3% |
| Native Hawaiian and Other Pacific Islander | 0 | 0.0% |
| Some other race | 9 | 0.5% |
| Two or more races | 54 | 2.9% |
| Hispanic or Latino (of any race) | 21 | 1.1% |

=== 2010 census ===
As of the census of 2010, there were 1,860 people, 841 households, and 543 families living in the city. The population density was 1,823.5 inhabitants per square mile (704.1/km^{2}). There were 954 housing units at an average density of 935.3 per square mile (361.1/km^{2}). The racial makeup of the city was 99.0% White, 0.1% African American, 0.2% Native American, 0.2% Asian, 0.1% from other races, and 0.4% from two or more races. Hispanic or Latino of any race were 1.3% of the population.

There were 841 households, of which 27.6% had children under the age of 18 living with them, 47.2% were married couples living together, 11.7% had a female householder with no husband present, 5.7% had a male householder with no wife present, and 35.4% were non-families. 31.2% of all households were made up of individuals, and 16% had someone living alone who was 65 years of age or older. The average household size was 2.21 and the average family size was 2.73.

The median age in the city was 43.9 years. 20.5% of residents were under the age of 18; 8% were between the ages of 18 and 24; 23.2% were from 25 to 44; 28.8% were from 45 to 64; and 19.5% were 65 years of age or older. The gender makeup of the city was 49.1% male and 50.9% female.

=== 2000 census ===
As of the census of 2000, there were 2,017 people, 879 households, and 588 families living in the city. The population density was 2,074.1 people per square mile (802.9/km^{2}). There were 961 housing units at an average density of 988.2 per square mile (382.5/km^{2}). The racial makeup of the city was 98.56% White, 0.05% African American, 0.64% Native American, 0.30% Asian, 0.15% from other races, and 0.30% from two or more races. Hispanic or Latino of any race were 0.25% of the population.

There were 879 households, out of which 29.2% had children under the age of 18 living with them, 52.0% were married couples living together, 11.3% had a female householder with no husband present, and 33.0% were non-families. 30.9% of all households were made up of individuals, and 18.8% had someone living alone who was 65 years of age or older. The average household size was 2.29 and the average family size was 2.81.

In the city, the population was spread out, with 22.2% under the age of 18, 7.1% from 18 to 24, 25.4% from 25 to 44, 24.5% from 45 to 64, and 20.8% who were 65 years of age or older. The median age was 42 years. For every 100 females, there were 90.1 males. For every 100 females age 18 and over, there were 84.3 males.

The median income for a household in the city was $30,755, and the median income for a family was $37,621. Males had a median income of $31,000 versus $21,522 for females. The per capita income for the city was $17,206. About 12.8% of families and 15.3% of the population were below the poverty line, including 19.0% of those under age 18 and 12.3% of those age 65 or over.

== See also ==
- List of cities and towns along the Ohio River
- Pleasants County Courthouse
- Cain House
- Billy Greenhorn
