= Pine Grove, Pleasants County, West Virginia =

Pine Grove
- Unincorporated community
- Location within the state of West Virginia Pine Grove (the United States)
- Coordinates: 39°22′1″N 81°2′39″W
- Country: United States
- State: West Virginia
- County: Pleasants
- Time zone: UTC-5 (Eastern (EST))
  - Summer (DST): UTC-4 (EDT)

Pine Grove is an unincorporated community in Pleasants County, West Virginia, United States. In 2005, the town was given a targeted grant of $75,000 to reduce emissions from its school buses.
