= Pleasants County, West Virginia =

County in West Virginia, United States

- County
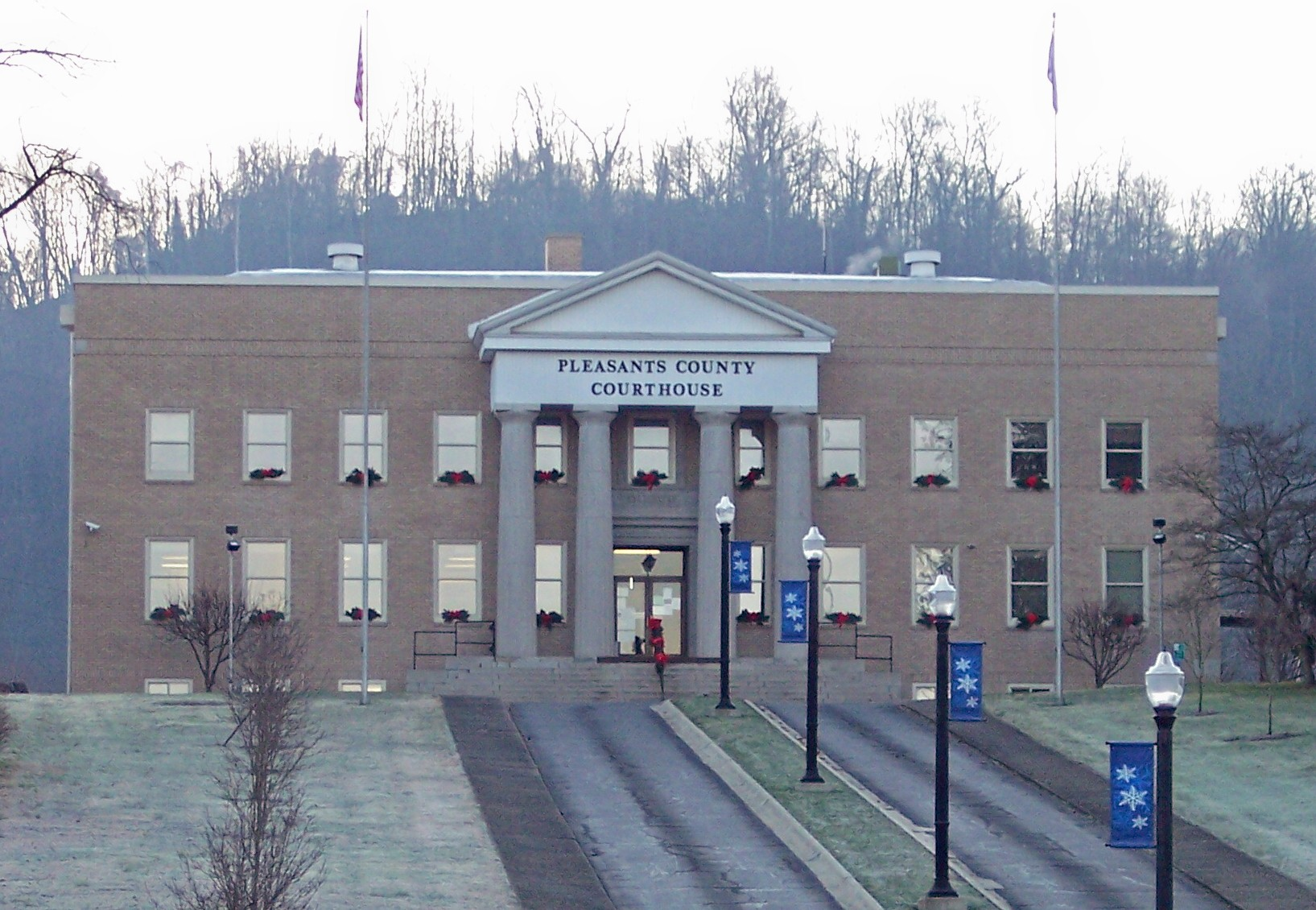
- Pleasants County Courthouse in St. Marys

- Location within the U.S. state of West Virginia
- Coordinates: 39°22′N 81°10′W
- Country: United States
- State: West Virginia
- Founded: March 29, 1851
- Named for: James Pleasants
- Seat: St. Marys
- Largest city: St. Marys

Area
  - Total: 135 sq mi (350 km^{2})
  - Land: 130 sq mi (340 km^{2})
  - Water: 4.4 sq mi (11 km^{2}) 3.3%

Population (2020)
  - Total: 7,653
  - Estimate (2025): 7,338 ▼
  - Density: 59/sq mi (23/km^{2})
- Time zone: UTC−5 (Eastern)
  - Summer (DST): UTC−4 (EDT)
- Congressional district: 1st
- Website: www.pleasantscountywv.gov

Pleasants County is a county located in the U.S. state of West Virginia. At the 2020 census, the population was 7,653. Its county seat is St. Marys.

== History ==
Pleasants County was formed by the Virginia General Assembly from portions of adjacent Wood, Ritchie and Tyler counties on March 29, 1851. The county's namesake is James Pleasants, Jr., an esteemed former US Senator and Virginia Governor. On June 20, 1863, at the height of the Civil War, Pleasants County was one of fifty Virginia counties that entered the Union as the state of West Virginia.

In 1863, West Virginia's counties were divided into civil townships, with the intention of encouraging local government. This proved impractical in the heavily rural state, and in 1872 the townships were converted into magisterial districts. Pleasants County was divided into six districts: Grant, Jefferson, Lafayette, McKim, Union, and Washington. These remained largely unchanged for over a century, but in the 1980s the six historic magisterial districts were consolidated into four new districts: District A, District B, District C, and District D.

== Geography ==
According to the United States Census Bureau, the county has a total area of 135 square miles (350 km^{2}), of which 130 square miles (340 km^{2}) is land and 4.4 square miles (11 km^{2}) (3.3%) is water. It is the fourth-smallest county in West Virginia by area.

=== Major highways ===
- West Virginia Route 2
- West Virginia Route 16
- West Virginia Route 807

=== Adjacent counties ===
- Washington County, Ohio (north)
- Tyler County (east)
- Ritchie County (southeast)
- Wood County (southwest)

=== National protected area ===
- Ohio River Islands National Wildlife Refuge (part)

== Demographics ==
Historical population
| Census | Pop. | Note | %± |
|---|---|---|---|
| 1860 | 2,945 | | — |
| 1870 | 3,012 | | 2.3% |
| 1880 | 6,256 | | 107.7% |
| 1890 | 7,539 | | 20.5% |
| 1900 | 9,345 | | 24.0% |
| 1910 | 8,074 | | −13.6% |
| 1920 | 7,379 | | −8.6% |
| 1930 | 6,545 | | −11.3% |
| 1940 | 6,692 | | 2.2% |
| 1950 | 6,369 | | −4.8% |
| 1960 | 7,124 | | 11.9% |
| 1970 | 7,274 | | 2.1% |
| 1980 | 8,236 | | 13.2% |
| 1990 | 7,546 | | −8.4% |
| 2000 | 7,514 | | −0.4% |
| 2010 | 7,605 | | 1.2% |
| 2020 | 7,653 | | 0.6% |
| 2025 (est.) | 7,338 | ▼ | −4.1% |
U.S. Decennial Census; 1790–1960 1900–1990; 1990–2000 2010–2020

=== 2020 census ===
As of the 2020 census, there were 7,653 people, 2,880 households, and 3,209 housing units in the county, of which 10.3% were vacant.

Of the households, 29.2% had children under the age of 18 living with them, 58.1% were married couples living together, 24.5% had a female householder with no spouse or partner present, and 18.2% had a male householder with no spouse present; the average household and family size was 3.06.

About 27.0% of all households were made up of individuals and 13.6% had someone living alone who was 65 years of age or older.

Of the residents, 18.8% were under the age of 18 and 20.6% were 65 years of age or older; the median age was 44.4 years. For every 100 females there were 117.8 males, and for every 100 females age 18 and over there were 118.8 males.

The racial makeup of the county was 94.7% White, 1.2% Black or African American, 0.3% American Indian and Alaska Native, 0.2% Asian, 0.3% from some other race, and 3.3% from two or more races. Hispanic or Latino residents of any race comprised 0.8% of the population.

Among occupied housing units, 81.0% were owner-occupied and 19.0% were renter-occupied. The homeowner vacancy rate was 1.9% and the rental vacancy rate was 7.4%.

Pleasants County, West Virginia – Racial and ethnic composition Note: the US Census treats Hispanic/Latino as an ethnic category. This table excludes Latinos from the racial categories and assigns them to a separate category. Hispanics/Latinos may be of any race.
| Race / Ethnicity (NH = Non-Hispanic) | Pop 2000 | Pop 2010 | Pop 2020 | % 2000 | % 2010 | % 2020 |
|---|---|---|---|---|---|---|
| White alone (NH) | 7,363 | 7,354 | 7,215 | 97.99% | 96.70% | 94.28% |
| Black or African American alone (NH) | 36 | 96 | 95 | 0.48% | 1.26% | 1.24% |
| Native American or Alaska Native alone (NH) | 33 | 11 | 22 | 0.44% | 0.14% | 0.29% |
| Asian alone (NH) | 15 | 8 | 17 | 0.20% | 0.11% | 0.22% |
| Pacific Islander alone (NH) | 0 | 0 | 0 | 0.00% | 0.00% | 0.00% |
| Other race alone (NH) | 2 | 8 | 10 | 0.03% | 0.11% | 0.13% |
| Mixed race or Multiracial (NH) | 37 | 67 | 231 | 0.49% | 0.88% | 3.02% |
| Hispanic or Latino (any race) | 28 | 61 | 63 | 0.37% | 0.80% | 0.82% |
| Total | 7,514 | 7,605 | 7,653 | 100.00% | 100.00% | 100.00% |

=== 2010 census ===
As of the 2010 United States census, there were 7,605 people, 2,861 households, and 2,021 families living in the county. The population density was 58.5 inhabitants per square mile (22.6/km^{2}). There were 3,390 housing units at an average density of 26.1 units per square mile (10.1 units/km^{2}). The racial makeup of the county was 97.3% white, 1.3% black or African American, 0.2% American Indian, 0.1% Asian, 0.1% from other races, and 1.0% from two or more races. Those of Hispanic or Latino origin made up 0.8% of the population. In terms of ancestry,

Of the 2,861 households, 31.0% had children under the age of 18 living with them, 56.1% were married couples living together, 9.8% had a female householder with no husband present, 29.4% were non-families, and 24.9% of all households were made up of individuals. The average household size was 2.44 and the average family size was 2.90. The median age was 42.4 years.

The median income for a household in the county was $38,882 and the median income for a family was $54,391. Males had a median income of $52,738 versus $23,750 for females. The per capita income for the county was $18,770. About 6.7% of families and 13.7% of the population were below the poverty line, including 12.6% of those under age 18 and 10.8% of those age 65 or over.

=== 2000 census ===
As of the census of 2000, there were 7,514 people, 2,887 households, and 2,136 families living in the county. The population density was 58 inhabitants per square mile (22/km^{2}). There were 3,214 housing units at an average density of 25 units per square mile (9.7 units/km^{2}). The racial makeup of the county was 98.30% White, 0.48% Black or African American, 0.47% Native American, 0.20% Asian, 0.07% from other races, and 0.49% from two or more races. 0.37% of the population were Hispanic or Latino of any race.

There were 2,887 households, out of which 32.70% had children under the age of 18 living with them, 60.10% were married couples living together, 10.40% had a female householder with no husband present, and 26.00% were non-families. 22.90% of all households were made up of individuals, and 12.30% had someone living alone who was 65 years of age or older. The average household size was 2.51 and the average family size was 2.93.

In the county, the population was spread out, with 23.80% under the age of 18, 7.80% from 18 to 24, 28.70% from 25 to 44, 24.80% from 45 to 64, and 14.90% who were 65 years of age or older. The median age was 39 years. For every 100 females there were 100.20 males. For every 100 females age 18 and over, there were 96.20 males.

The median income for a household in the county was $32,736, and the median income for a family was $37,795. Males had a median income of $31,068 versus $18,077 for females. The per capita income for the county was $16,920. About 10.90% of families and 13.70% of the population were below the poverty line, including 17.80% of those under age 18 and 7.90% of those age 65 or over.

== Education ==
In Pleasants County, there is a single school district including one high school, one middle school, and two elementary schools. The county is also served by the Mid Ohio Valley Technical Institute, which offers vocational education in a variety of fields.

== Politics ==
Although Pleasants County, like neighbouring rock-ribbed Unionist and Republican Ritchie, Doddridge and Tyler Counties, voted against secession at the Virginia Secession Convention, during the Third Party System the county voted consistently Democratic. However, from 1900 onwards the county has generally voted Republican except in strong Democratic election victories, and like all of West Virginia it has become rock-ribbed GOP in the twenty-first century as a consequence of de-unionization in the coal industry.

United States presidential election results for Pleasants County, West Virginia
| Year | Republican | | Democratic | | Third party(ies) | |
| Year | No. | % | No. | % | No. | % |
|---|---|---|---|---|---|---|
| 1912 | 493 | 29.43% | 796 | 47.52% | 386 | 23.04% |
| 1916 | 876 | 49.16% | 899 | 50.45% | 7 | 0.39% |
| 1920 | 1,657 | 52.91% | 1,449 | 46.26% | 26 | 0.83% |
| 1924 | 1,619 | 48.72% | 1,675 | 50.41% | 29 | 0.87% |
| 1928 | 1,821 | 60.06% | 1,210 | 39.91% | 1 | 0.03% |
| 1932 | 1,580 | 44.82% | 1,921 | 54.50% | 24 | 0.68% |
| 1936 | 1,820 | 48.73% | 1,907 | 51.06% | 8 | 0.21% |
| 1940 | 1,896 | 51.59% | 1,779 | 48.41% | 0 | 0.00% |
| 1944 | 1,622 | 51.84% | 1,507 | 48.16% | 0 | 0.00% |
| 1948 | 1,548 | 49.95% | 1,536 | 49.56% | 15 | 0.48% |
| 1952 | 1,900 | 53.79% | 1,632 | 46.21% | 0 | 0.00% |
| 1956 | 2,144 | 57.56% | 1,581 | 42.44% | 0 | 0.00% |
| 1960 | 1,982 | 53.22% | 1,742 | 46.78% | 0 | 0.00% |
| 1964 | 1,339 | 36.93% | 2,287 | 63.07% | 0 | 0.00% |
| 1968 | 1,534 | 47.06% | 1,522 | 46.69% | 204 | 6.26% |
| 1972 | 2,025 | 62.65% | 1,207 | 37.35% | 0 | 0.00% |
| 1976 | 1,608 | 48.62% | 1,699 | 51.38% | 0 | 0.00% |
| 1980 | 1,852 | 53.73% | 1,494 | 43.34% | 101 | 2.93% |
| 1984 | 2,255 | 60.54% | 1,458 | 39.14% | 12 | 0.32% |
| 1988 | 1,761 | 55.26% | 1,421 | 44.59% | 5 | 0.16% |
| 1992 | 1,248 | 36.97% | 1,387 | 41.08% | 741 | 21.95% |
| 1996 | 1,265 | 39.89% | 1,478 | 46.61% | 428 | 13.50% |
| 2000 | 1,884 | 58.73% | 1,267 | 39.50% | 57 | 1.78% |
| 2004 | 2,061 | 60.00% | 1,349 | 39.27% | 25 | 0.73% |
| 2008 | 1,772 | 59.56% | 1,142 | 38.39% | 61 | 2.05% |
| 2012 | 1,825 | 64.24% | 955 | 33.61% | 61 | 2.15% |
| 2016 | 2,358 | 74.17% | 621 | 19.53% | 200 | 6.29% |
| 2020 | 2,742 | 78.54% | 699 | 20.02% | 50 | 1.43% |
| 2024 | 2,632 | 78.61% | 656 | 19.59% | 60 | 1.79% |

== Communities ==
=== Cities ===
- City of St. Marys

=== Towns ===
- Town of Belmont

=== Magisterial districts ===
==== Current ====
- District A
- District B
- District C

==== Historic ====
- Grant
- Jefferson
- Lafayette
- McKim
- Union
- Washington

=== Unincorporated communities ===
- Arvilla
- Calcutta
- Hebron
- Pine Grove
- Vaucluse

== See also ==
- National Register of Historic Places listings in Pleasants County, West Virginia
