= Miletus (disambiguation) =

Miletus was an Ancient Greek city in Ionia.

Miletus can also refer to:

- Miletus (Crete), a town of ancient Crete, Greece
- Miletus (Mysia), a town of ancient Mysia, now in Turkey
- Miletus (Paphlagonia), a town of ancient Paphlagonia, now in Turkey
- Metropolis of Miletus, defunct diocese of the Church of Constantinople
- Miletus (mythology), mythical founder of the city
- Miletus, West Virginia, an unincorporated community
- Miletus (butterfly), a genus of butterflies
- Vitus Miletus (1549–1615), German Roman Catholic theologian

== See also ==
- List of ancient Milesians, many of them identified as "of Miletus"
- Meletius of Antioch (before 357 - 381), bishop
- Meletus (fl. 4th-3rd century BC), prosecutor in the trial of Socrates
