= Tornadoes of 1948 =

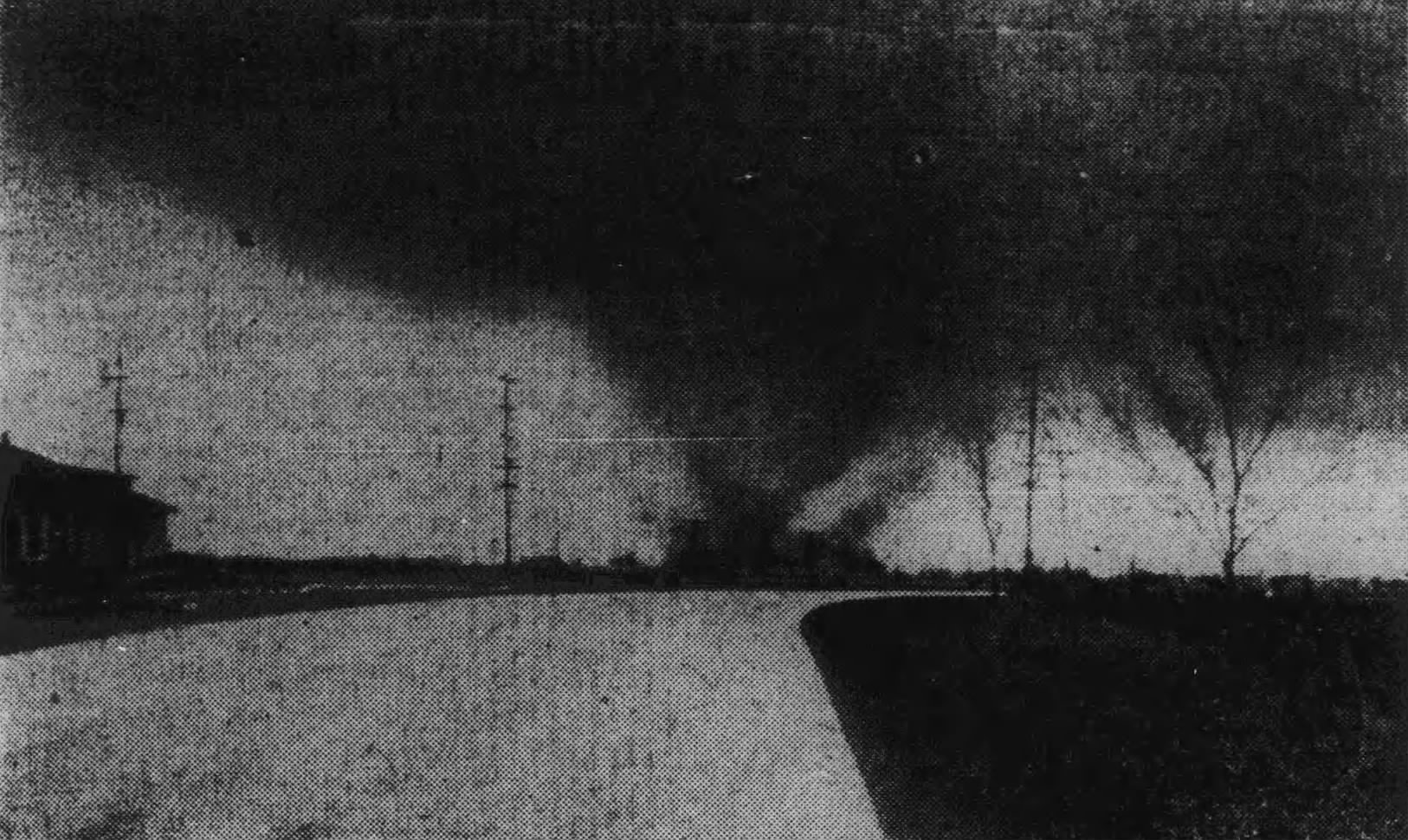
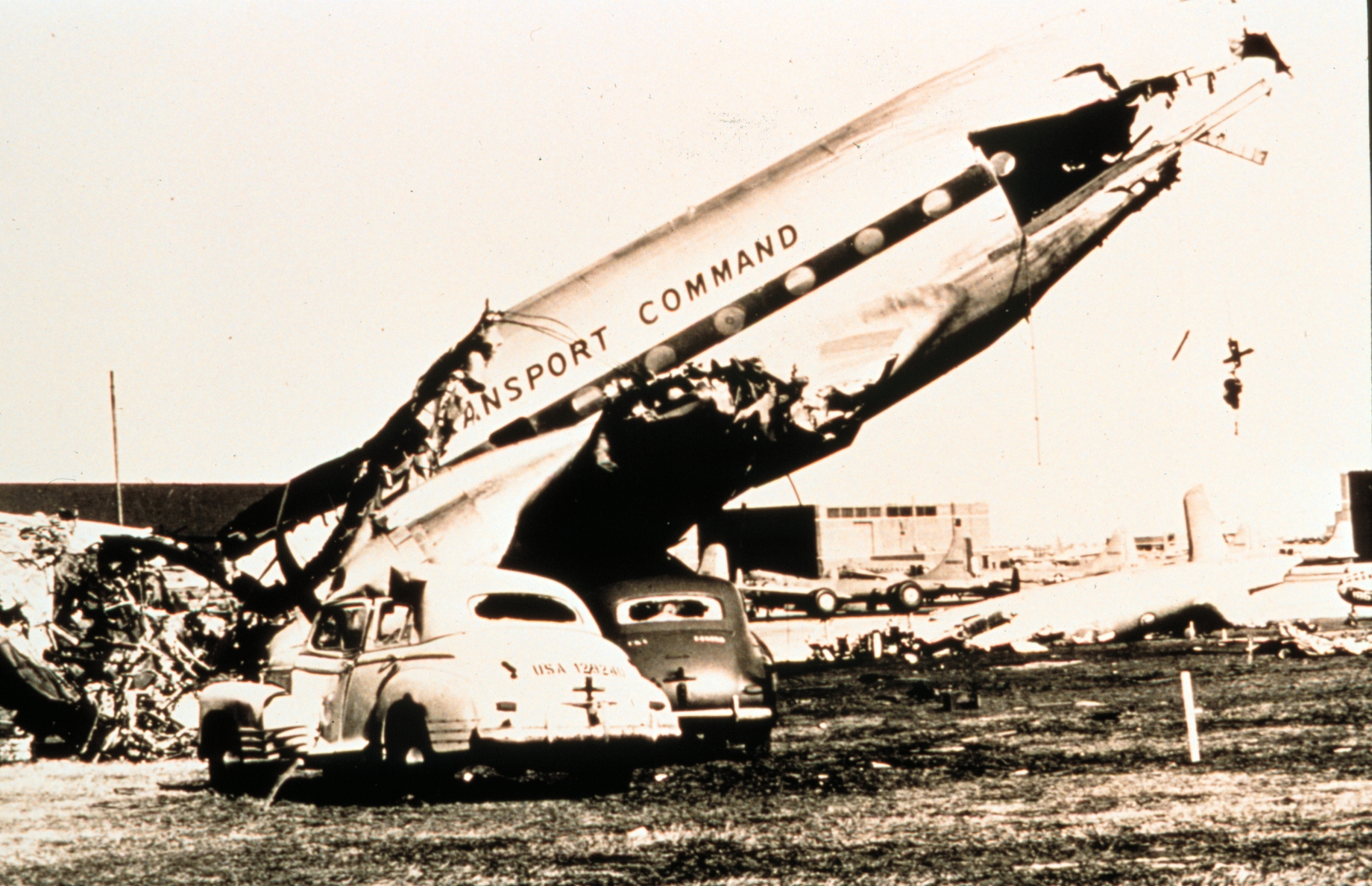
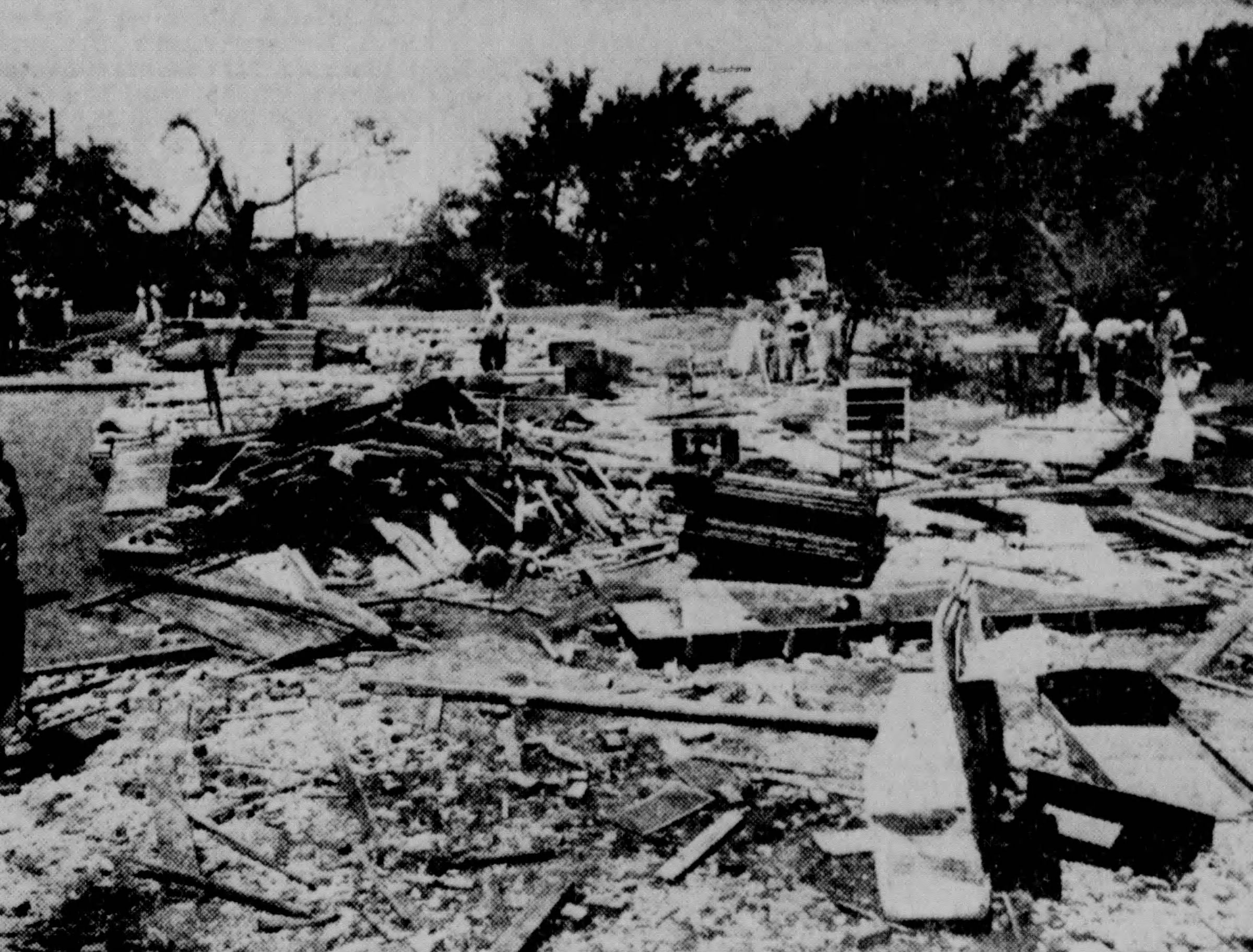
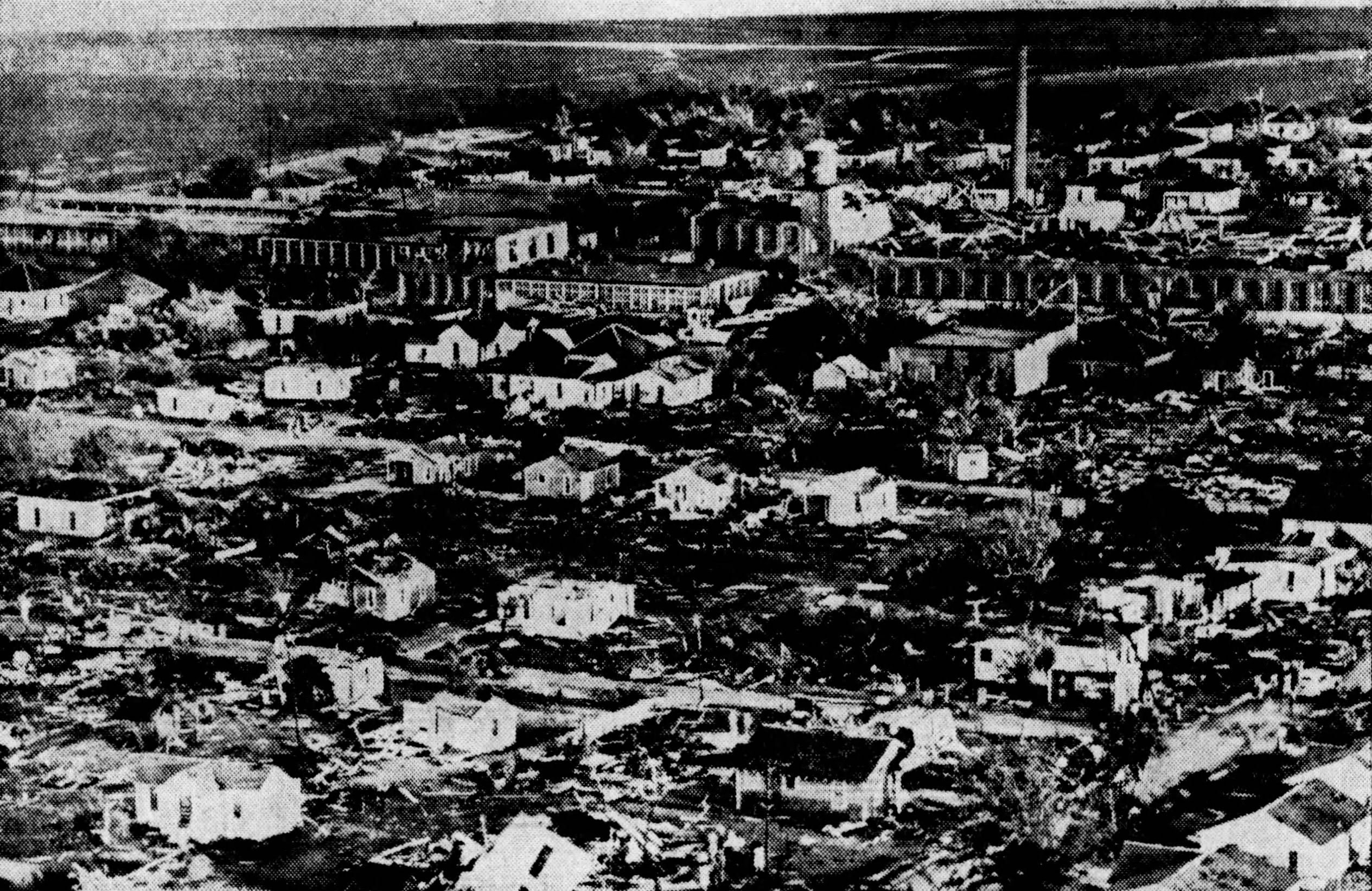
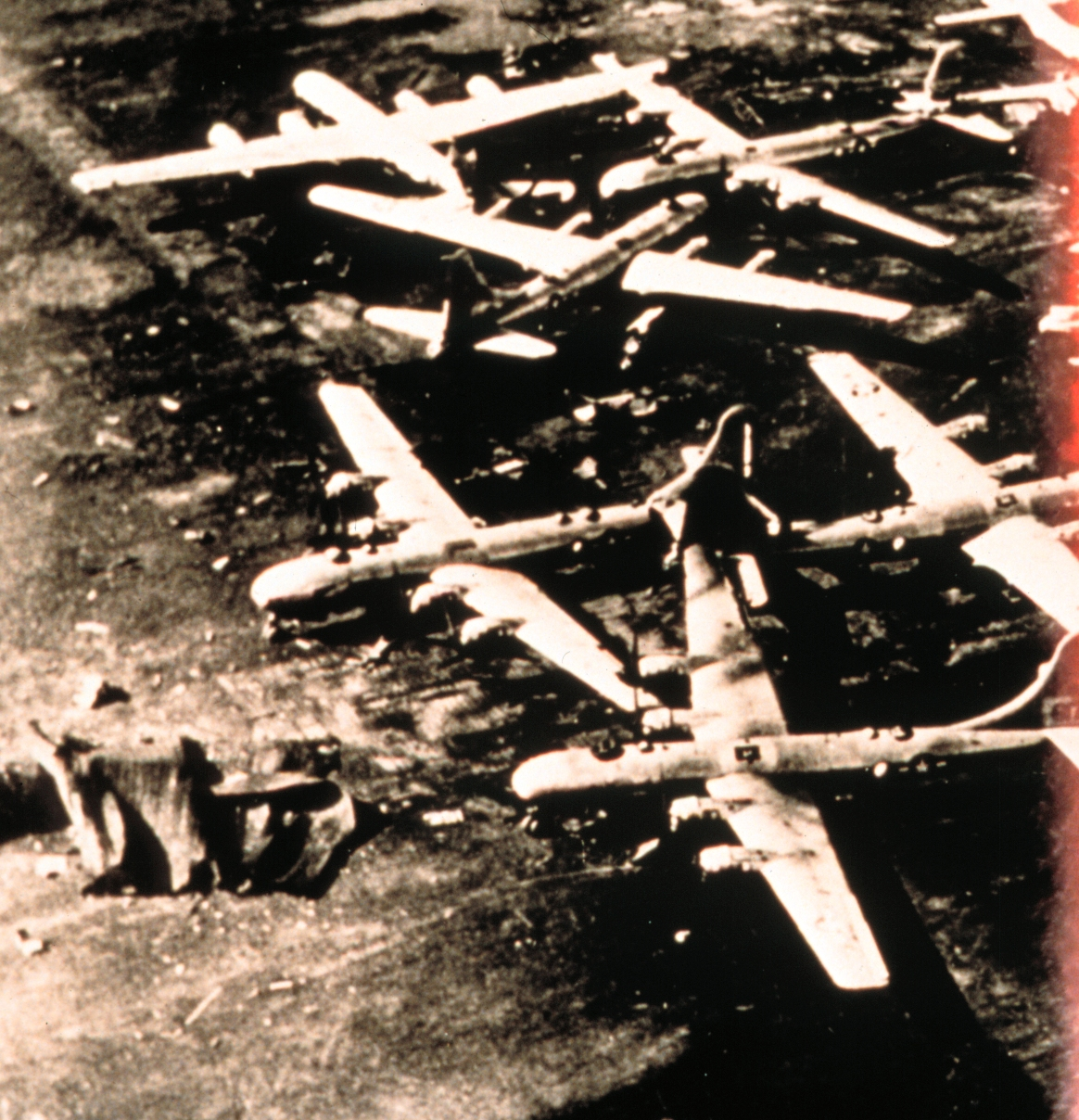
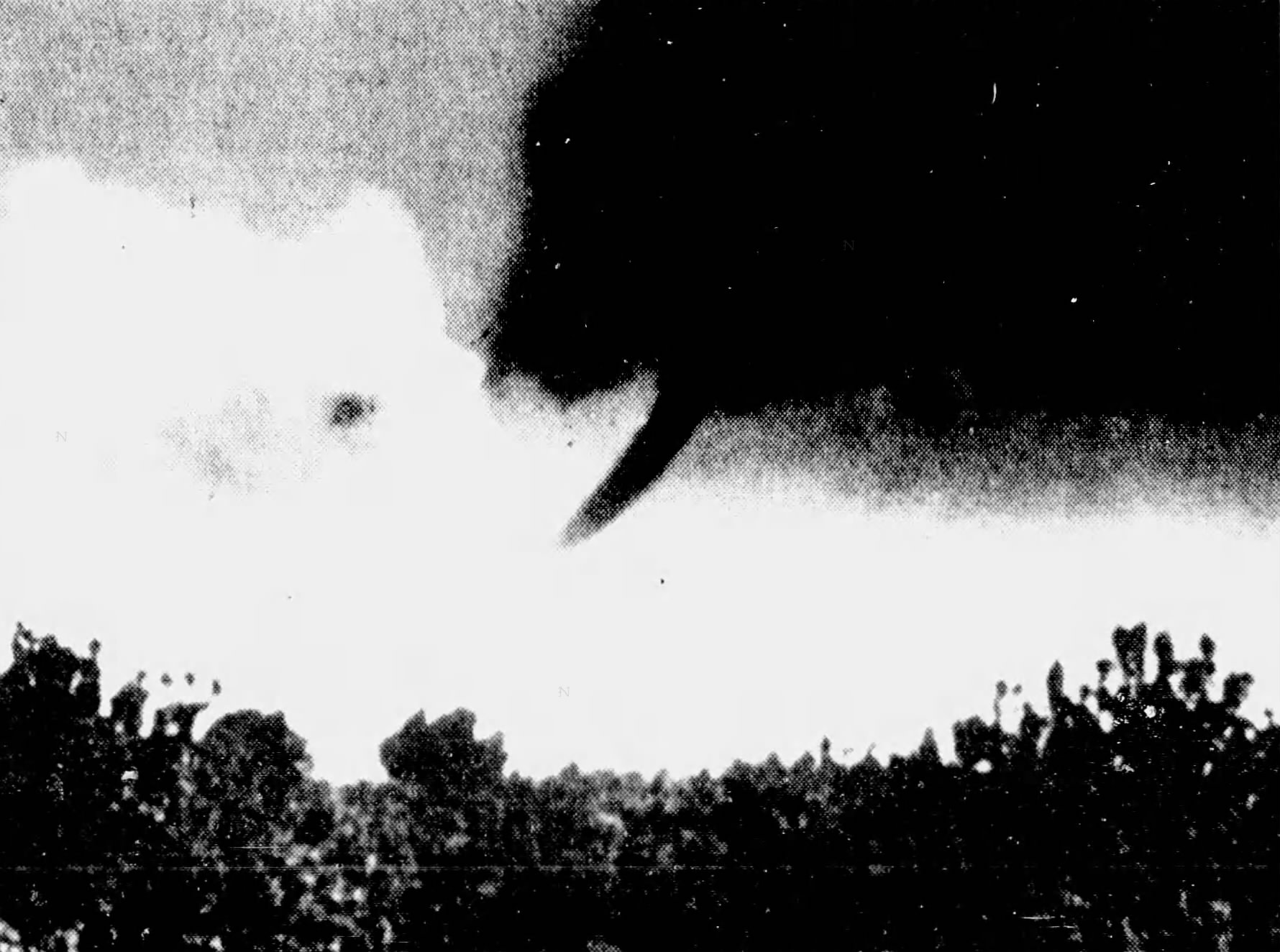
- Clockwise from top: A large multi-vortex F4 tornado near Manteno, Illinois on April 7; Damage to a home west of Talmage, Nebraska after an F4 tornado on June 22; Multiple planes on Tinker Air Force Base that were damaged by an F3 tornado on March 20; A funnel cloud over Yakima Valley AVA on May 20; An aerial view of McKinney, Texas after an F3 tornado on May 3; A large airplane on Tinker Air Force Base after an F3 tornado on March 25.
- Timespan: January 1 — November 19
Maximum rated tornado
F4 tornado
- List
  – Belgrade, Missouri
  on March 19
  – Bunker Hill-Gillespie, Illinois
  on March 19
  – Honey Bend, Illinois
  on March 19
  – Dustin, Oklahoma
  on March 25
  – Vian, Oklahoma
  on March 25
  – Coatsville, Indiana
  on March 26
  – Grant Park, Illinois-Hebron, Indiana
  on April 7
  – Ionia, Iowa
  on April 23
  – Neosho County, Kansas
  on May 1
  –Alpha-Sumter, Kentucky
  on May 2
  – Mill Creek, Oklahoma
  on May 3
  – Mercury, Texas
  on May 5
  – Henryville, Indiana
  on June 7
  – Wichita, Kansas
  on June 21
  – Nebraska City, Nebraska
  on June 22
- Tornadoes in U.S.: ≥159 (Note: Totals are from Grazulis, who only lists F2 and stronger tornadoes and F1/F0 tornadoes with fatalities.)
- Damage (U.S.): Unknown
- Fatalities (U.S.): ≥136
- Fatalities (worldwide): ≥139

This page documents the tornadoes and tornado outbreaks of 1948, primarily in the United States. Most tornadoes form in the U.S., although some events may take place internationally. Tornado statistics for older years like this often appear significantly lower than modern years due to fewer reports or confirmed tornadoes. Also, prior to 1950, tornadoes were not officially surveyed by the U.S. Weather Bureau, which would later become the National Weather Service, and thus had no official rating. All documented significant tornadoes were instead given unofficial ratings by tornado experts like Thomas P. Grazulis.

All documented significant tornadoes prior to 1950 in the United States were given unofficial ratings by tornado experts like Thomas P. Grazulis, which this article uses for the ratings below. Most of these records are limited to significant tornadoes; those rated F2 or higher on the Fujita scale, or which caused a fatality. Some events listed by Grazulis were likely tornado families rather than single tornadoes. There are also no official tornado counts for each month, so not every month is included in this article. In subsequent years, the documentation of tornadoes became much more widespread and efficient, with the average annual tornado count being around 1,253. Outside the United States, various meteorological organizations, like the European Severe Storms Laboratory rated tornadoes, which are considered official ratings.

== Events ==
Fatal United States tornadoes in 1948
- Approximate touchdown location of killer tornadoes in 1948 Summary of tornadoes: January 1 – Mississippi (1 death); February 13 – Mississippi (5 deaths); February 26 – Texas (2 deaths); February 27 – Texas (1 death); March 19 – Missouri (4 deaths); March 19 – Illinois (33 deaths); March 19 – Kentucky (2 deaths); March 19 – Ohio (3 deaths); March 19 – Ohio (1 death); March 25 – Oklahoma (10 deaths); March 25 – Oklahoma, Arkansas (4 deaths); March 26 – Indiana (19 deaths); March 26 – Indiana (1 death); March 26 – Alabama (3 deaths); April 1 – Georgia (1 death); April 6 – Kentucky (2 deaths); April 7 – Illinois, Indiana (4 deaths); April 23 – Iowa (5 deaths); May 1 – Kansas (2 deaths); May 1 – Oklahoma (4 deaths); May 2 – Kentucky (5 deaths); May 2 – West Virginia (4 deaths); May 3 – Texas (3 deaths); June 7 – Indiana (1 death); June 22 – Nebraska, Iowa (1 death); July 29 – Wisconsin (1 death); July 29 – Wisconsin (1 death); September 4 – Florida, Georgia (2 deaths); November 5 – Louisiana (1 death); November 5 – Kentucky (1 death); November 5 – Mississippi (9 deaths); November 5 – Mississippi (1 death); Total fatalities: ≥136

=== United States yearly total ===
Confirmed tornadoes by Fujita rating
FU	F0	F1	F2	F3	F4	F5	Total
≥	?	≥1?	≥114	≥29	≥15	≥0	≥159

== January ==
=== January 1 ===
FU	F0	F1	F2	F3	F4	F5
0	?	?	2	1	0	0

Tornadic activity continued into the new year from the previous day. An intense tornado, with an estimated intensity of F3, struck Atlanta, Carmack, and Mantee, Mississippi, scattering furniture for miles. One person was killed in Mantee. Later in the day, a tornado destroyed seven farms and tore the second story off an eighth farm. The tornado had an estimated strength of F2. Around the same time, a long-track tornado impacted Clermont, Brown, Clinton, and Fayette counties in Ohio. The tornado had an estimated strength of F2 as it destroyed three barns near Newtonsville and unroofed several homes along its 40 miles (64 km) path with an estimated width of 75 yards (69 m).

== February ==
=== February 13 ===
An F3 tornado struck Newton, Mississippi, which killed five people and injured 36 others. Thirty large and small homes were completely destroyed with debris scattered for miles and the tornado cut “a freight train into two parts”. It was noted that the path of this tornado was S-shaped or it was two tornadoes.

=== February 26–27 ===
FU	F0	F1	F2	F3	F4	F5
0	?	≥1	2	0	0	0

On the night of February 26, an F2 tornado destroyed seven homes and damaged 32 in Woodson, Texas. Three people were injured with two requiring hospitalization. After midnight, an F1 tornado briefly touched down near Bartonville, Texas. One victim died after she was pinned under a house and was unable to escape when coals from an overturned stove set it on fire. The following afternoon, F2 tornado damaged five homes and a store in Centerton, Indiana.

== March ==
=== March 18–27 ===
FU	F0	F1	F2	F3	F4	F5
0	0	0	19	11	6	0

A seven days tornado outbreak began on March 18 with a F3 tornado that hit Delhi, Oklahoma that resulted in three injuries, a F2 tornado struck Clinton, Oklahoma that resulted in many businesses unroofed and barns destroyed with one injury. Another F3 tornado struck Slaughterville destroying two homes and several barns. On March 19, a skipping tornado (F2) destroyed a church in Landeck, Ohio with two deaths before destroying a barn where one was killed, in total three were killed and 17 were injured by this tornado. An early morning F4 tornado struck Belgrade, Missouri with four deaths and 38 injuries in eight destroyed homes, the deadliest tornado of the outbreak struck Fosterburg (nine), Bunker Hill (19) and Gillepsie (five) at F4 intensity which left a total of 33 fatalities and 449 injuries. Another F4 tornado (part of the Bunker Hill tornado family) destroyed many homes and barns near Honey Bend, a F3 tornado struck Rising Sun, Indiana with 19 injuries. The next day, a F3 tornado struck the Tinker Air Force Base on March 20 which injured 8 people with three of the injuries were in the watch tower and caused $10 million in damage while a F2 tornado damaged few buildings from the corner of the air force base. On March 23, F3 tornado destroyed a small home near Charlotte Airport, North Carolina. On March 25, a F3 tornado struck Tinker Air Force Base which left many hangars and airplanes destroyed, only one was injured and the tornado was successfully forecasted, a F4 tornado (tornado family) killed 10 and injuring 25 from Hughes to McIntosh County, Oklahoma. Another tornado family (F4) moved from McIntosh County Oklahoma to Crawford County, Arkansas leaving four deaths and 15 injuries. The next day, a F4 tornado destroyed 80% of Coatsville, Indiana with 13 (one indirect) deaths, the tornado also left six additional fatalities before and after hitting Coatsville. The outbreak ended on March 27 with three (non-fatal) F2 tornadoes in Georgia. In total, the tornado outbreak left 80 deaths and 896 injuries. The second Tinker Air Force Base tornado (March 25) marks the first successful tornado forecast.

== April ==
=== April 6–9 ===
This three day-outbreak started with two isolated non-fatal F2 tornadoes in Alabama and Missouri. The following day, a high end F3 tornado destroyed seven farms and eight home with some of the homes damaged at near-F4 intensity near Braidwood, Illinois. Another F3 tornado tore seven farm homes apart and destroying barns near Leverett, two were injured in Urbana by this tornado. The only violent tornado of the outbreak was a multi vortex F4 tornado that killed four, three north of Grant Park, Illinois and one south of Hebron, Indiana. An F2 tornado originating in Cook County, Illinois struck Gary, Indiana where many homes were unroofed or torn apart. Eleven were injured by this tornado, one in Illinois and ten others in Indiana. Another F2 tornado injured one in Vermillion County, Illinois and three others in Indiana. The last intense tornado to form during the outbreak was a high-end F3 that struck Alexandria, Indiana where five homes, a grocery store, and four farms outside of town were destroyed. Eight people were injured by this tornado. The next day, the last killer tornado of the outbreak was an F2 that struck the western part of Lexington, Kentucky where many barns and stables were destroyed at a race track; one was killed. The last tornado of the outbreak was a brief but strong F2 which unroofed or shifted many homes north-northwest of Houston Center. Overall, the outbreak produced 10 tornadoes and left five deaths and 95 injuries.

=== April 23–24 ===
A small but deadly tornado outbreak began on April 23 when a F4 tornado killed five people in Ionia, Iowa and a F2 tornado destroying barns, silos, machinery and windmills on four farms in northeast Rochester, Minnesota. The rest of the outbreak features four non-fatal F2 tornadoes in Kansas and South Dakota. In total, the outbreak produced seven tornadoes, leaving five deaths and 38 injuries.

== May ==
=== May 1–5 ===
A four day deadly tornado outbreak began with two F2 tornadoes that destroyed barns and damaged a few homes in mostly rural areas of Kansas. Later, a multi-vortex F4 tornado destroyed 60 farms in Neosho County resulting in two deaths west and north of Erie. In Oklahoma, an F3 tornado destroyed 14 farms in Craig County before killing four and injuring over 100 on the shore of Grand Lake where 60 small homes were damaged or destroyed. Another F3 tornado injured 15 and destroyed dozens of cabins as well as a large home. This tornado was parallel to the previous F3 tornado. The first day of the outbreak produced six tornadoes, causing six deaths and 197 injuries.

The second day of the outbreak, May 2, began with two F2 tornadoes in Ohio that mostly destroyed barns and damaged a few homes. A violent F4 tornado leveled many homes in Clinton and Wayne Counties, Kentucky, causing five deaths, three being in Alpha and two in Sumter, as well as 60 injuries. An F3 tornado killed four in Big Isaac, West Virginia, resulting in 78 injuries. An F2 tornado injured 8 in Indiana before dissipating in Mercer County, Ohio. The second day of the outbreak resulted in nine deaths and 146 injuries from five separate tornadoes.

The third day of the outbreak, May 3, featured two tornadoes: one in Oklahoma and another in Texas. An F4 tornado caused three injuries as it tracked through scarcely populated ranch country, while also leveling seven farm houses near Mill Creek, Oklahoma. An F3 tornado killed 3 and injuring 43 in McKinney, Texas, most coming from residential areas.

The fourth day of the outbreak, May 4 saw two non-fatal tornadoes. The first was an F2 tornado that destroyed a school and unroofed several homes in Plainview, Louisiana. The second was an F2 in Georgia that destroyed a barn, unroofed a home, and uprooted several trees.

The final day of the outbreak, May 5, featured two tornadoes, one in Oklahoma and another in Texas. The first was a violent F4 tornado in Mercury, Texas. This tornado swept away two ranch homes and a barn, destroying farming equipment and killing livestock in the process. No casualties were confirmed with this tornado. The final tornado of the outbreak was an F2 tornado that destroyed four homes and a church while unroofing many homes in Blocker, Oklahoma. In total, the outbreak produced 17 tornadoes while killing 18 (+ one indirect) and injuring 390 others.

=== May 24 (Germany) ===
A significant tornado, rated F2/T5 by the European Severe Storms Laboratory struck Ahrenshagen-Daskow, Germany.

== June ==
=== June 4 (Soviet Union) ===
FU	F0	F1	F2	F3	F4	F5
0	0	0	2	0	0	0

An F2 tornado struck Nizhnie Posady, Soviet Union with winds up to 50 to 60 metres per second (110 to 130 mph; 180 to 220 km/h). The tornado pulled a “heavy metal detail” that weighed 500 kilograms (1,100 lb) and threw it 200 metres (220 yd) and the tornado lifted a 250 kilograms (550 lb) metal tube and threw it several meters. The tornado also sucked water up from a river, destroyed one home, and tore the roofs off several other homes along a path of 13.5 kilometres (8.4 mi) with an average width of 60 metres (66 yd). 20 minutes after the previous tornado touched down, a second F2 tornado struck Zherdëvo and Novo-Rusanovo, Soviet Union, uprooting large trees, ripping roofs off multiple homes and destroying a church dome along a path of 12.5 kilometres (7.8 mi).

== July ==
=== July 22 (Germany and Belarus) ===
FU	F0	F1	F2	F3	F4	F5
2	0	2	0	0	0	0

A F1/T3 tornado struck the Bavaria region of Germany, causing damage along a path of 0.5 to 5 kilometres (0.31 to 3.11 mi) with an average width of 100 metres (110 yd). It was noted that this tornado was visually observed by a person as it occurred over a rural, cropland. About an hour after the F1/T3 tornado, another tornado struck Nuremberg, killing 11 people and injuring four others while it destroyed 40 homes. The European Severe Storms Laboratory did not give a rating to the tornado, however, it was noted that it was a “strong tornado”, meaning equivalent to at least F2 on the Fujita scale. About one hour after the Nuremberg tornado, a long-track tornado struck Auerbach in der Oberpfalz, killing a 12-year-old girl. The tornado traveled 25 kilometres (16 mi) due east. Like the Nuremberg tornado, the European Severe Storms Laboratory did not give a rating to the tornado, however, it was noted that it was a “strong tornado”, meaning equivalent to at least F2 on the Fujita scale. About an hour after the previous tornado, a fourth tornado struck Novy Pahost, Belarus. A barn was destroyed, other buildings were “almost fully destroyed”, and a woman was lifted by the tornado, which received a rating of F1 from the European Severe Storms Laboratory. It was noted that the Belarusian State University conducted research on this tornado.

== September ==
=== September 13 (Denmark) ===
Emergency management reported a tornado that ripped the roof off a farmhouse in Strandby, Denmark. The European Severe Storms Laboratory rated this tornado F2 on the Fujita scale.

=== September 14 (Italy) ===
A waterspout came ashore in Anzio, Italy, which threw a mobile home 40 metres (44 yd) and threw a car “violently” into a tree. Other structures sustained damage and tree damage occurred. This tornado has not received a rating from the European Severe Storms Laboratory. The La Stampa newspaper wrote an article about the “exceptionally violent” tornado, saying it lasted for 20 minutes as it caused damage. According to La Stampa, a wooden and brick home was completely destroyed, ten homes had their roofs completely torn off, and about 50 large pine trees were completely uprooted. The tornado caused several million lire in damage.

== October ==
=== October 18 (United Kingdom) ===
A tornado, rated F2/T4 by the European Severe Storms Laboratory struck St Albans, England. It was noted that a damage survey was conducted by a “severe weather expert” with no further information given.

== November ==
=== November 5 ===
FU	F0	F1	F2	F3	F4	F5
0	0	0	9	2	0	0

== December ==
=== December 13 (United Kingdom) ===
A tornado, rated F2/T5 by the European Severe Storms Laboratory struck Dudley, England. It was noted that a damage survey was conducted by a “severe weather expert” with no further information given.
