= Meathouse Fork =

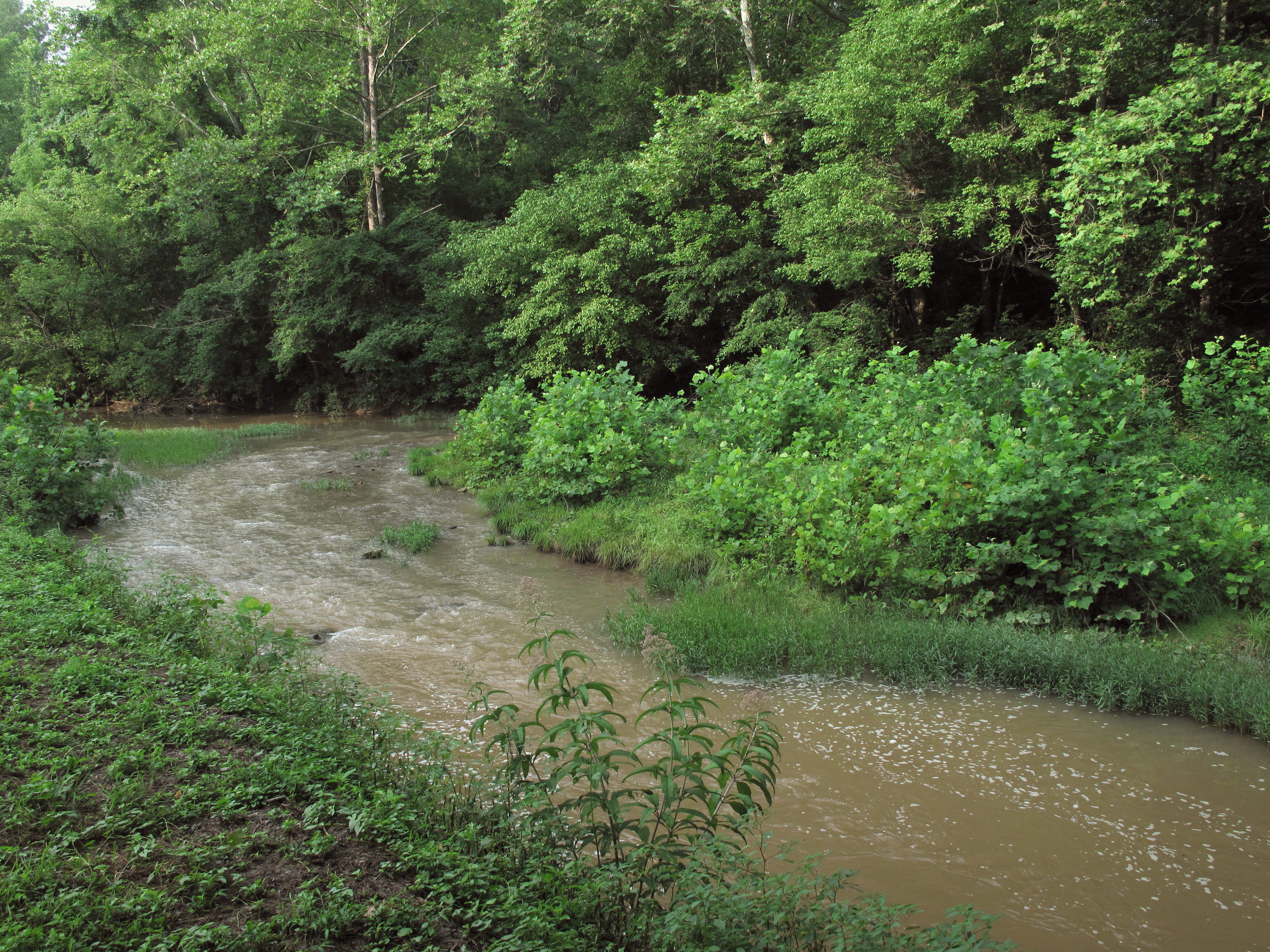
- Meathouse Fork south of Smithburg, West Virginia

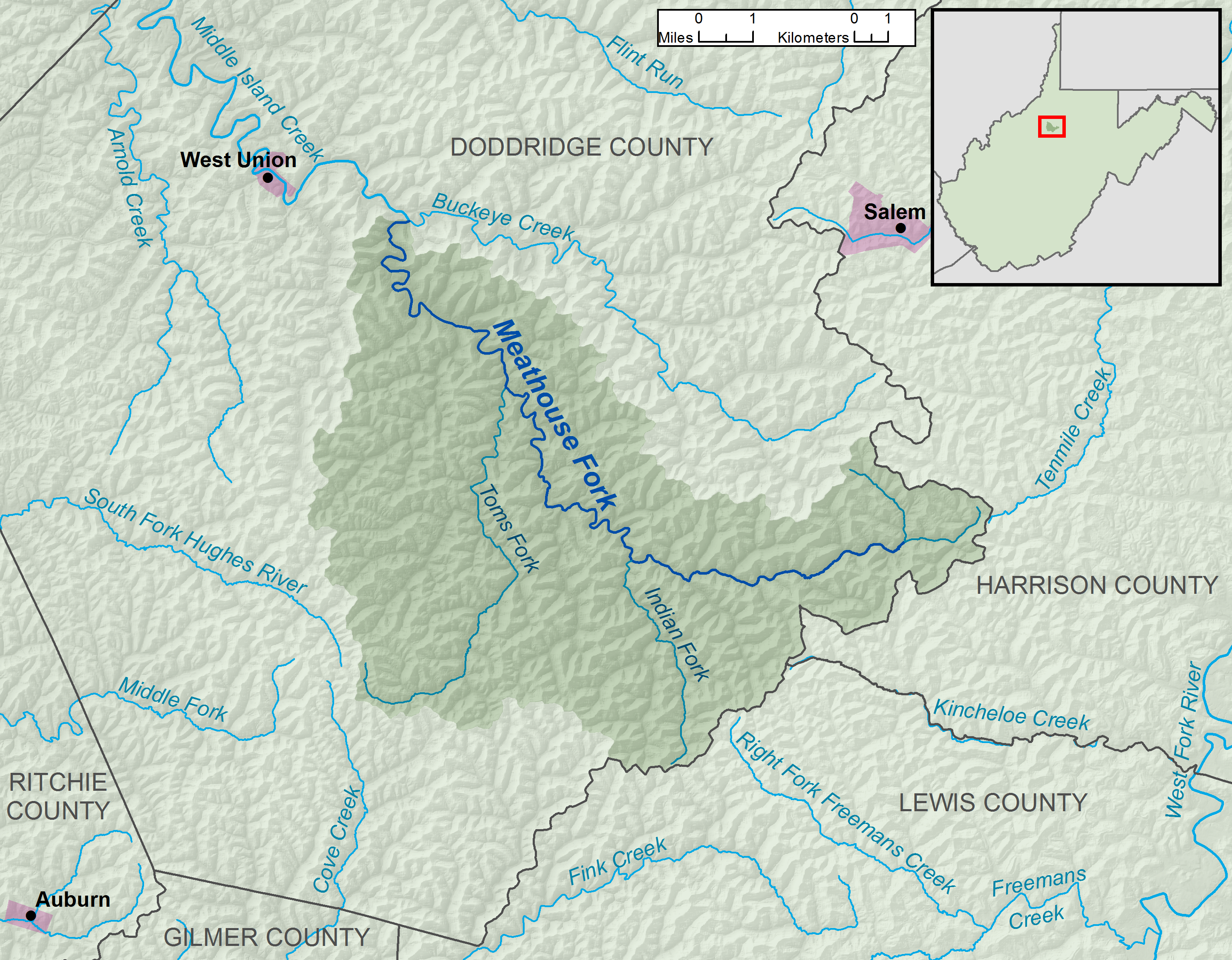
- A map of the Meathouse Fork and its watershed

Location
- Country: United States
- State: West Virginia
- County: Doddridge

Physical characteristics
- Source: Big Isaac Creek
  - location: southeast of Miletus
  - coordinates: 39.2191667°N 80.5761111°W
  - length: 2 miles (3.2 km)
  - elevation: 1,190 ft (360 m)
- 2nd source: Laurel Run
  - location: northeast of Big Isaac
  - coordinates: 39.2105556°N 80.5327778°W
  - length: 1.6 miles (2.6 km)
  - elevation: 1,154 ft (352 m)
- Source confluence
  - location: west of Big Isaac
  - coordinates: 39.2000893°N 80.5556517°W
  - elevation: 935 ft (285 m)
- Mouth: Middle Island Creek
  - location: Smithburg
  - coordinates: 39.2842512°N 80.7281587°W
  - elevation: 794 ft (242 m)
- Length: 19.7 mi (31.7 km)
- Basin size: 64.6 sq mi (167 km^{2})

Basin features
- Tributaries
  - left: Toms Fork
- Hydrologic Unit Codes: 050302010401, 050302010403 (USGS)

The Meathouse Fork is a tributary of Middle Island Creek, 19.7 miles (31.7 km) long, in north-central West Virginia in the United States. Via Middle Island Creek and the Ohio River, it is part of the watershed of the Mississippi River, draining an area of 64.6 square miles (167 km^{2}) in a rural region on the unglaciated portion of the Allegheny Plateau.

== Geography ==
The Meathouse Fork's entire course and watershed are in southern and central Doddridge County. It is formed in southeastern Doddridge County by the confluence of Big Isaac Creek, 2 miles (3.2 km) long, which rises approximately 1 mile (1.6 km) southeast of the community of Miletus and flows southeastward; and Laurel Run, 1.6 miles (2.6 km) long, which rises approximately 0.75 miles (1.21 km) northeast of the community of Big Isaac and flows westward, through Big Isaac. From this confluence, approximately 0.9 miles (1.4 km) west of Big Isaac, the Meathouse Fork flows generally northwestward, through the unincorporated communities of Avon, New Milton, Sugar Camp, and Blandville, to Smithburg, where it joins Buckeye Creek to form Middle Island Creek.

The Meathouse Fork collects its largest tributary, Toms Fork, at Sugar Camp. In the vicinity of Sugar Camp and Blandville, it is paralleled by West Virginia Route 18.

== History ==
The origin of the name of this watershed and community, given by the earliest white settlers in the 1820s, was detailed by a local historian a century later:

On this spot of ground hunters from other sections who came to this community to hunt deer and bear built a log cabin in which to store their meat until they could move it to their homes in other and, sometimes, remote sections. From this meat house, the branch of Middle Island Creek which extends from near Smithburg to Big Isaac took the name of Meat House Fork.

== Recreation ==
=== Fishing ===
Multiple West Virginia stage record fish were caught along the Meathouse Fork.

== See also ==
- List of rivers of West Virginia
