= Alexandria Monroe High School =

Location
- 1 Burden Court; Alexandria, Madison County, Indiana 46001; United States; 40.2492°N 85.6779°W

Information
- Type: Public, secondary
- School district: Alexandria Community School Corporation
- Principal: Greg Kyle
- Teaching staff: 51.00 (FTE)
- Grades: 7-12
- Gender: Co-educational
- Enrollment: 690 (2023-2024)
- Student to teacher ratio: 13.53
- Color
- Athletics conference: Central Indiana Athletic Conference
- Mascot: Tiger
- Nickname: Alex
- Rival: Madison-Grant, Frankton, Elwood
- Website: Official website

Alexandria Monroe High School is a high school in Alexandria, Indiana, United States.

== About ==
Alexandria Monroe High School is a co-educational public school enrolling students in grades 9–12. It is under the auspices of the Alexandria Community School Corporation. The school enrolls around 800 students.

== Athletics ==
The Alexandria-Monroe Tigers compete in the Central Indiana Athletic Conference. The Tigers won the IHSAA AA championship in baseball in 1998 as well as 2019. They also won the IHSAA AA Championship for boys basketball in 1998.

== Notable alumni ==
- J.D. Closser - former MLB catcher for the Colorado Rockies, current catcher coach for the MiLB AAA Indianapolis Indians
- Joey Martin Feek - former country music artist; married to singer/songwriter Rory Feek; starred in Can You Duet on CMT
- Bill Gaither - gospel singer and songwriter; married to Gloria Gaither; member of Gaither Vocal Band and was in Gaither Homecoming

== See also ==
- List of high schools in Indiana
