= JD Closser =

American baseball player (born 1980)

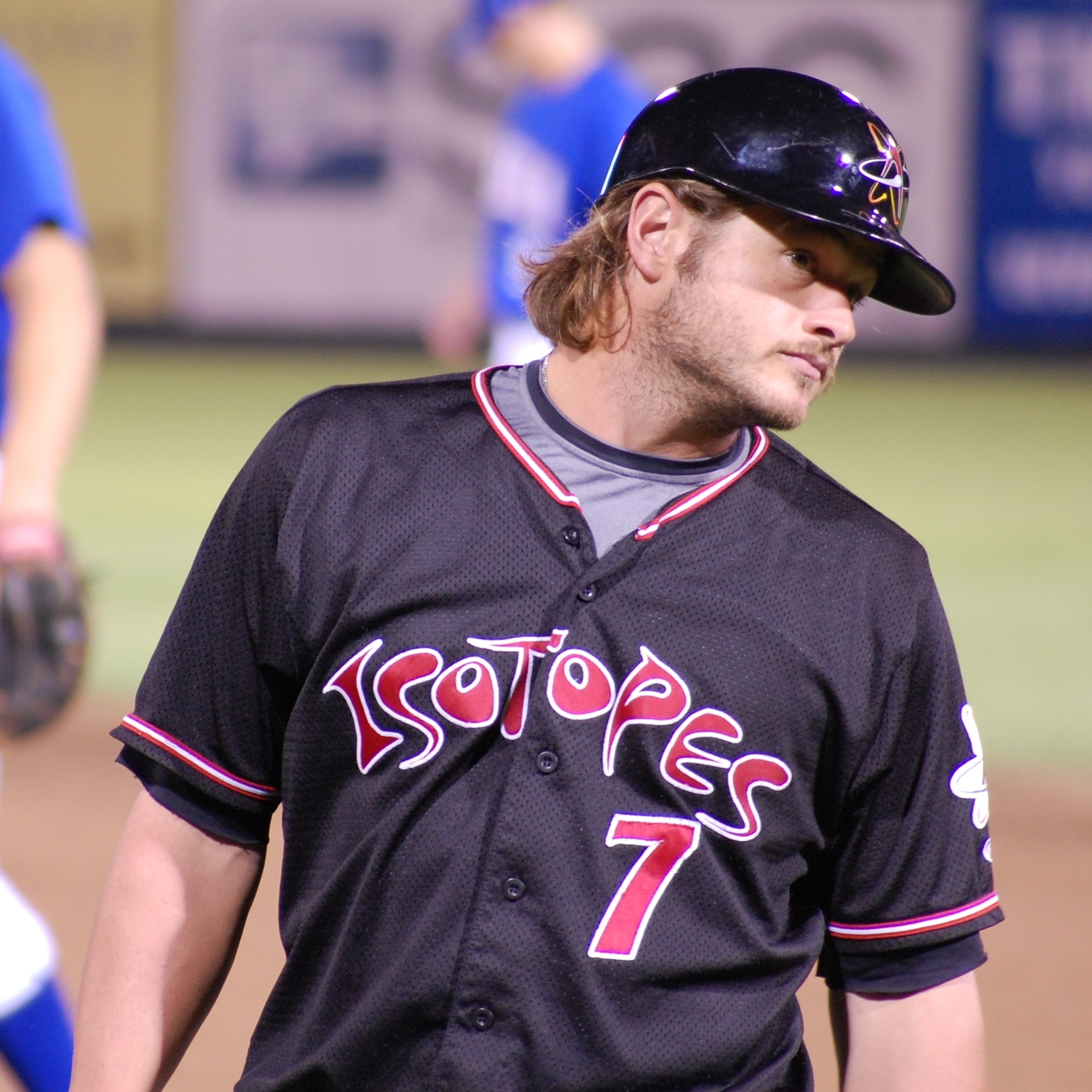
- Closser with the Albuquerque Isotopes in 2010
- Catcher
- Born: January 15, 1980 (age 46); Beech Grove, Indiana, U.S.
- Batted: Switch Threw: Right

MLB debut
- June 30, 2004, for the Colorado Rockies

Last MLB appearance
- October 1, 2006, for the Colorado Rockies

MLB statistics
- Batting average: .239
- Home runs: 10
- Runs batted in: 48
- Stats at Baseball Reference

Teams
- Colorado Rockies (2004–2006)

Jeffery Darrin Closser (born January 15, 1980) is an American former Major League Baseball catcher and current professional baseball coach.

== Baseball career ==
=== Arizona Diamondbacks ===
Closser was selected by the Arizona Diamondbacks in the 5th round of the 1998 MLB draft and played in their minor league system through 2001. In 1999 he was named to the Short Season A All-Star team and Pioneer League All-Star team while playing for the South Bend Silver Hawks.

=== Colorado Rockies ===
The Diamondbacks traded Closser and Jack Cust to the Colorado Rockies on January 2, 2002, for Mike Myers. With the Tulsa Drillers in 2003, Closser hit .283 with 13 home runs and 54 RBI, earning a spot on the Texas League All-Star team.

Closser made his debut midway through the 2004 season. Closser began the 2005 season as the starting catcher for the Colorado Rockies. The second half of the 2005 campaign, he lost his starting role to backup catcher Danny Ardoin. Closser was up and down from the minors to the majors in the 2006 season with the Rockies.

=== Milwaukee Brewers/Oakland Athletics ===
He was claimed off waivers by the Milwaukee Brewers on October 13, 2006. After just 17 games with the Nashville Sounds he was traded to the Oakland Athletics for outfielder Charles Thomas. He appeared in 81 games with the Sacramento River Cats, hitting .231 and then was selected

=== Chicago Cubs/New York Yankees/San Diego Padres ===
On April 10, 2008, Closser was released from the Iowa Cubs, the Triple-A team for the Chicago Cubs and signed with New York Yankees, who assigned him to the Scranton/Wilkes-Barre Yankees, their Triple-A affiliate. He was released by the Yankees on August 6 and signed with the Portland Beavers, the Triple-A affiliate of the San Diego Padres.

=== Los Angeles Dodgers ===
In February 2009, Closser signed a minor league contract with the Los Angeles Dodgers. He started play for the Chattanooga Lookouts, the Dodgers Double-A affiliate. On June 15, Closser was called up to the Albuquerque Isotopes, the Triple-A affiliate. With the Isotopes, Closser batted .295 with 2 homers and 31 RBI while alternating time at catcher and first base, sharing the catching duties with A. J. Ellis. In 2010, he spent the entire season at Albuquerque, appearing in 92 games with a .268 batting average. In 2011, he appeared in 69 games for the Isotopes, hitting .297, with 10 home runs while splitting time between catcher and first base. On July 16, he was released by the Dodgers and became a free agent.

He played with the Edmonton Capitals of the North American Baseball League in 2011.

== Coaching career ==
=== New York Yankees ===
Closser served as a coach for the Tampa Yankees in 2015, and as the Bullpen Coach for the Trenton Thunder in 2016 and 2017.

=== Atlanta Braves ===
During the 2021 season, Closser served as catching coordinator in the Atlanta Braves organization.

=== Pittsburgh Pirates ===
In 2026, Closser was named as the catching coach for the Indianapolis Indians the Triple-A affiliate of the Pittsburgh Pirates.

== Personal life ==
Closser officially changed his first name to "JD". Closser and his wife, Holley, have three daughters, Isabelle, Callie, and Maebry Ruth. He attended Alexandria Monroe High School in Alexandria, Indiana, where he led the Tigers to an IHSAA Class 2a state championship, and won the Indiana Mr. Baseball award in 1998.
