= Smithburg =

Smithburg may refer to:

- Smithburg, New Jersey
- Smithburg, West Virginia
- Smithsburg, Maryland
