= Orestes, Indiana =

- Town
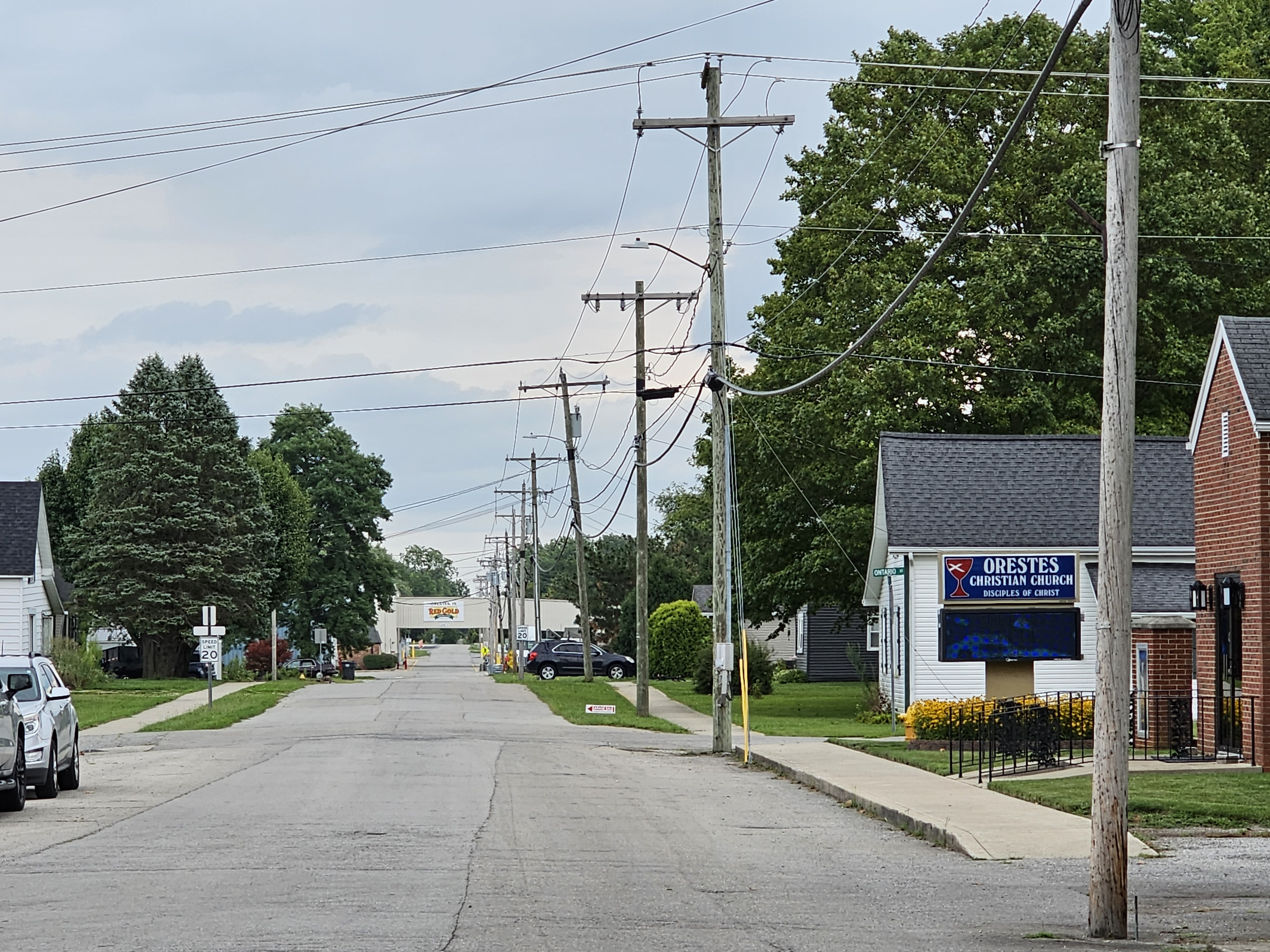

- Flag

- Location in Madison County, Indiana
- Coordinates: 40°16′18″N 85°43′30″W
- Country: United States
- State: Indiana
- County: Madison
- Township: Monroe

Government
  - Type: Council–manager government

Area
  - Total: 0.40 sq mi (1.04 km^{2})
  - Land: 0.40 sq mi (1.04 km^{2})
  - Water: 0 sq mi (0.00 km^{2})
- Elevation: 869 ft (265 m)

Population (2020)
  - Total: 329
  - Estimate (2025): 348 ▲
  - Density: 815.9/sq mi (315.01/km^{2})
- Time zone: UTC-5 (Eastern (EST))
  - Summer (DST): UTC-4 (EDT)
- ZIP code: 46063
- Area code: 765
- FIPS code: 18-56952
- GNIS feature ID: 2396835
- Website: www.townoforestes.org

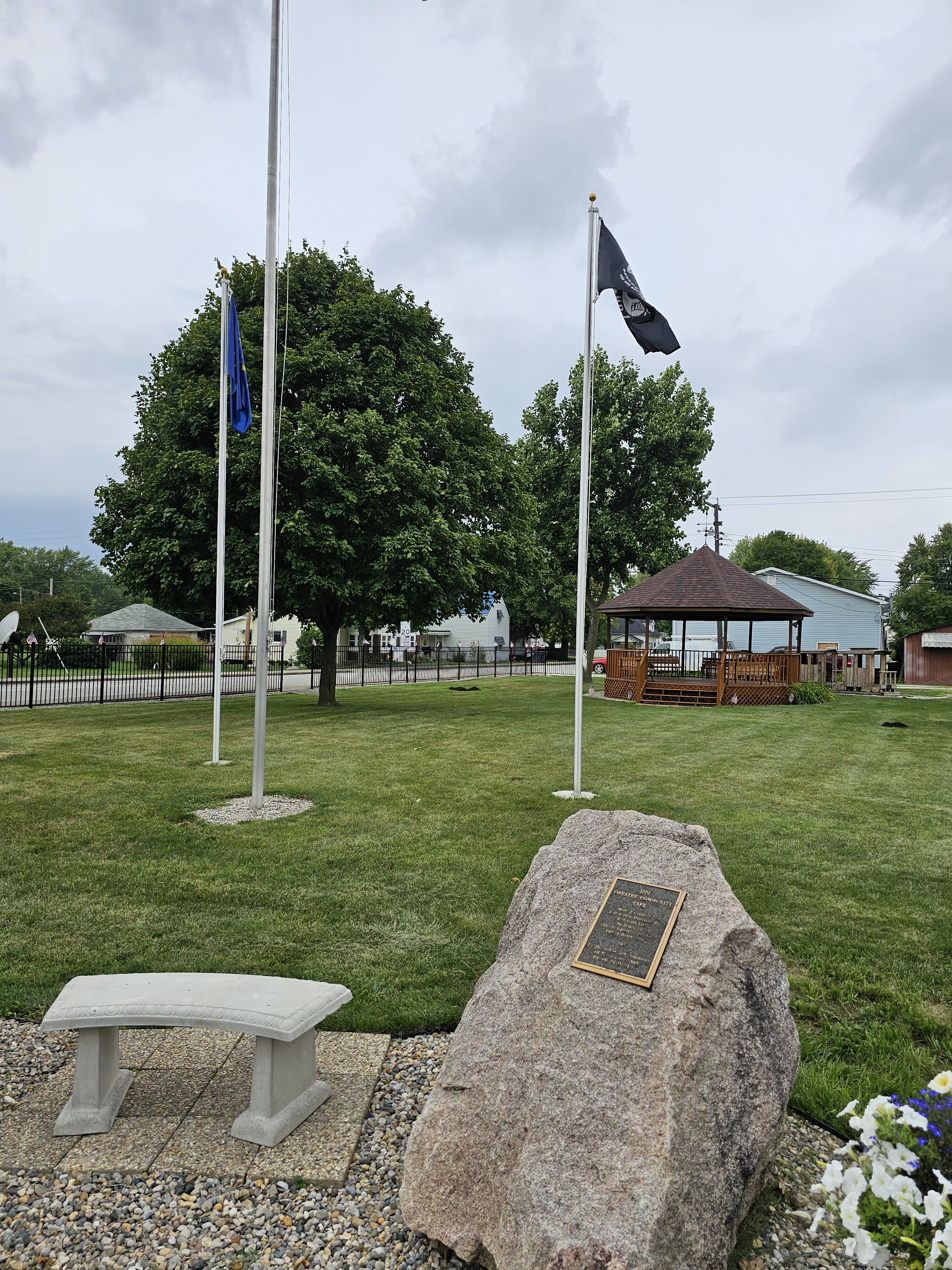
Orestes Community Park

Orestes is a town in Monroe Township, Madison County, Indiana, United States. It is part of the Indianapolis–Carmel–Anderson metropolitan statistical area. The population was 329 at the 2020 census, down from 414 in 2010.

== History ==
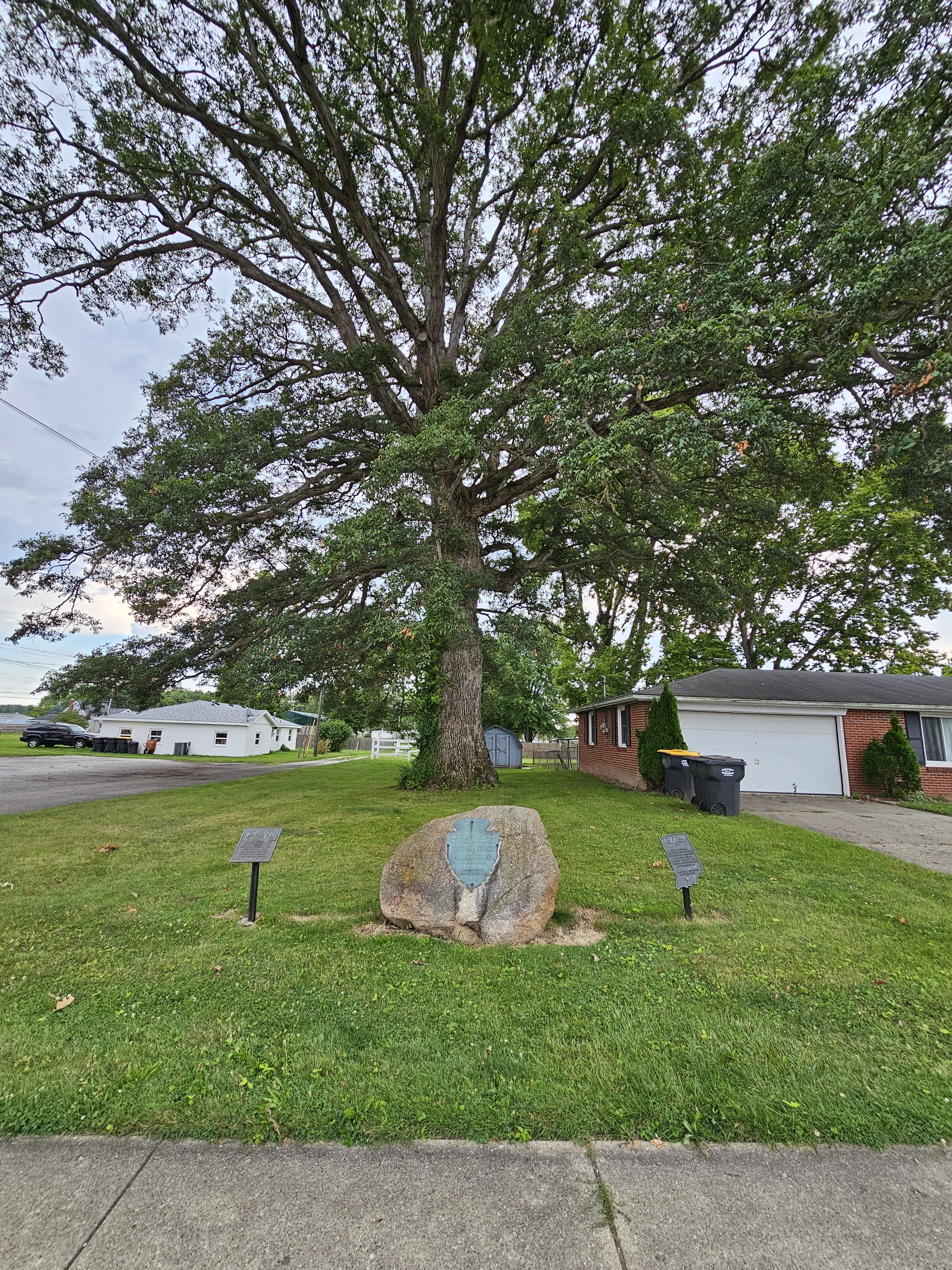
The Orestes Oak Tree has been a local landmark since approximately 1670.

Orestes was founded in 1876 when the railroad was extended to that point. Orestes was incorporated as a town in 1894.

Orestes was a little village known as "Lowrys Switch" until the town board decided to change the name and ask for suggestions for the name. Nathan McMahan sent in his son's name and upon its acceptance, the town became known as Orestes. Orestes McMahan was born on Christmas Day, 1876, and died September 14, 1946. He was a farmer all his life and never married.

Orestes is home to an oak tree that is estimated to be at least 350 years old. For many years the town hosted an annual Oak Tree Festival. It is also home to a Red Gold Tomatoes canning plant.

== Geography ==
Orestes is located in northern Madison County. Indiana State Road 28 runs along the northern border of the town, leading east 3 miles (5 km) to Alexandria and west 6 miles (10 km) to Elwood. Anderson, the Madison county seat, is 14 miles (23 km) to the south.

According to the U.S. Census Bureau, Orestes has a total area of 0.47 square miles (1.22 km^{2}), all land. Lilly Creek flows past the southeast corner of the town, leading southwest to Pipe Creek just south of the town limits, part of the White River watershed.

== Demographics ==
=== 2010 census ===
As of the census of 2010, there were 414 people, 148 households, and 114 families living in the town. The population density was 667.7 inhabitants per square mile (257.8/km^{2}). There were 177 housing units at an average density of 285.5 per square mile (110.2/km^{2}). The racial makeup of the town was 95.7% White, 0.2% African American, 0.5% Native American, 2.9% from other races, and 0.7% from two or more races. Hispanic or Latino of any race were 4.8% of the population.

There were 148 households, of which 38.5% had children under the age of 18 living with them;60.1% were married couples living together; 12.2% had a female householder with no husband present; 4.7% had a male householder with no wife present;and 23.0% were non-families. 18.9% of all households were made up of individuals, and 10.8% had someone living alone who was 65 years of age or older. The average household size was 2.80 and the average family size was 3.11.

The median age in the town was 35.8 years. 24.6% of residents were under the age of 18; 11.8% were between the ages of 18 and 24; 24.6% were from 25 to 44; 25.6% were from 45 to 64; and 13.3% were 65 years of age or older. The gender makeup of the town was 51.4% male and 48.6% female.

=== 2000 census ===
As of the census of 2000, there were 334 people, 129 households, and 94 families living in the town. The population density was 848.5 inhabitants per square mile (327.6/km^{2}). There were 147 housing units at an average density of 373.5 per square mile (144.2/km^{2}). The racial makeup of the town was 97.31% White, 0.30% African American, 0.30% Asian, 1.50% from other races, and 0.60% from two or more races. Hispanic or Latino of any race were 3.29% of the population.

There were 129 households, out of which 31.8% had children under the age of 18 living with them, 54.3% were married couples living together, 7.0% had a female householder with no husband present, and 27.1% were non-families. 22.5% of all households were made up of individuals, and 11.6% had someone living alone who was 65 years of age or older. The average household size was 2.59 and the average family size was 2.91.

In the town, the population was spread out, with 25.1% under the age of 18, 11.7% from 18 to 24, 29.9% from 25 to 44, 19.8% from 45 to 64, and 13.5% who were 65 years of age or older. The median age was 34 years. For every 100 females, there were 111.4 males. For every 100 females age 18 and over, there were 103.3 males.

Historical population
Census	Pop.	Note	%±
1900	778		—
1910	420		−46.0%
1920	395		−6.0%
1930	357		−9.6%
1940	412		15.4%
1950	482		17.0%
1960	507		5.2%
1970	519		2.4%
1980	539		3.9%
1990	458		−15.0%
2000	334		−27.1%
2010	414		24.0%
2020	329		−20.5%
2025 (est.)	348	▲	5.8%
U.S. Decennial Census

The median income for a household in the town was $39,219, and the median income for a family was $39,602. Males had a median income of $30,750 versus $21,250 for females. The per capita income for the town was $18,037. None of the families and 3.8% of the population were living below the poverty line, including no under eighteens and 11.8% of those over 64.

== Education ==
It is in the Alexandria Community School Corporation.

== Flag ==
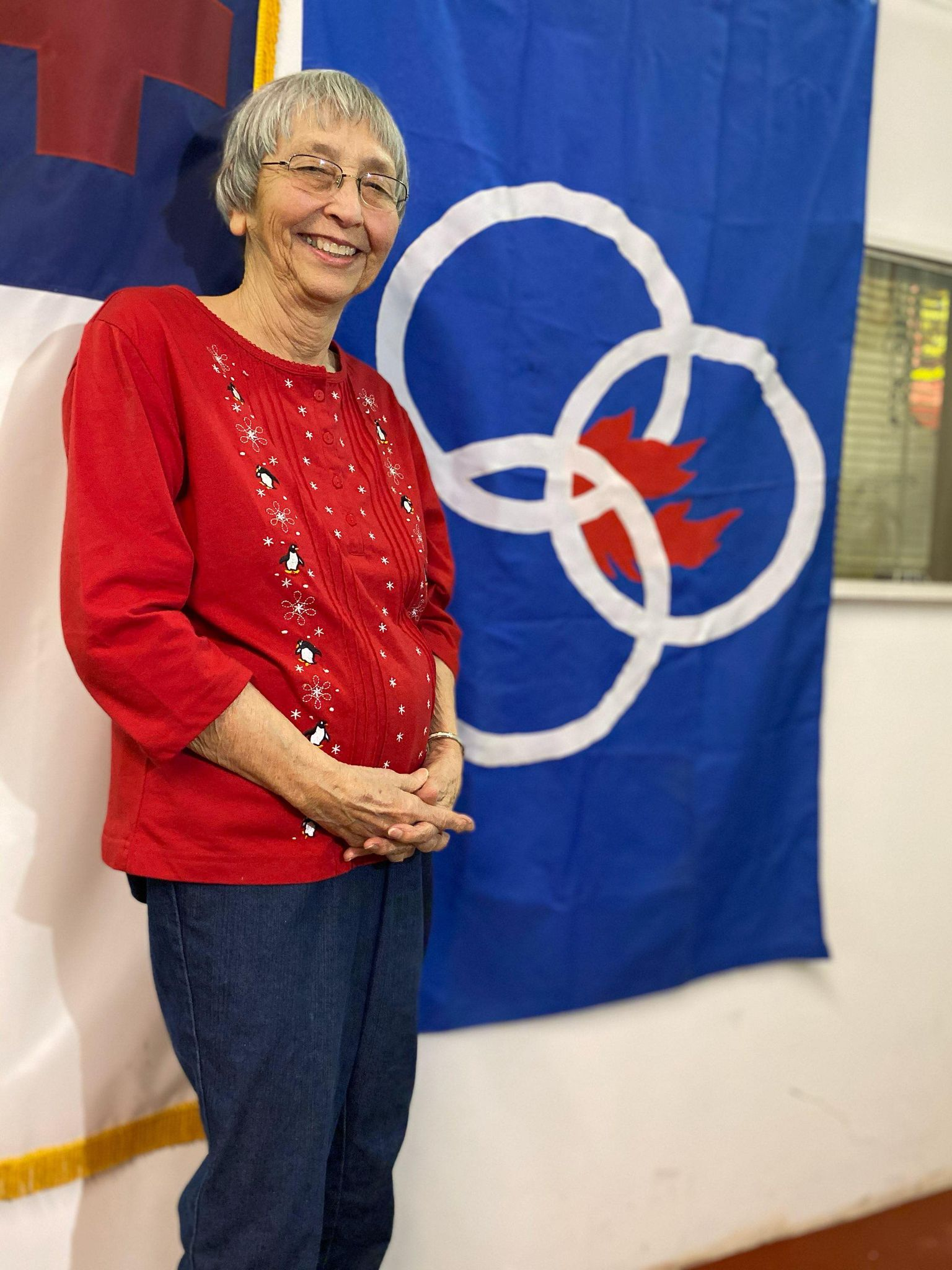
Mrs. Carolyn Shettle standing next to her flag which she created for the town of Orestes

The current flag of the town of Orestes was designed by town resident Carolyn Shettle and accepted by the Town Board in 1976. The flag consists of three white rings on a blue background with a red flame amidst the rings. The symbolism of the flag and its rings is as follows:

- Ring 1 stands for continuity, and the past, present, and future of Orestes.
- Ring 2 symbolizes Orestes' Delaware-Indian heritage.
- Ring 3 stands for Orestes itself.

The red flame on the flag represents the discovery of gas in the town, and also suggests the torch of liberty. Unintentionally, however, this flame outlines a descending dove, which is a symbol of peace and Christianity. The three colors of the flag (red, white, and blue) represent freedom, with the blue specifically representing independence.
