= Blandville =

Blandville may refer to several places in the United States:

- Blandville, Kentucky, city in Ballard County, Kentucky
- Blandville, West Virginia, unincorporated community in Doddridge County, West Virginia
