= Charles Thomas (baseball) =

American baseball player (born 1978)

- Left fielder
- Born: December 26, 1978 (age 47); Fairfield, California, U.S.
- Batted: Left Threw: Left

MLB debut
- June 23, 2004, for the Atlanta Braves

Last MLB appearance
- June 8, 2005, for the Oakland Athletics

MLB statistics
- Batting average: .259
- Home runs: 7
- Runs batted in: 32
- Stats at Baseball Reference

Former teams
- Atlanta Braves (2004); Oakland Athletics (2005)

Charles Wesley Thomas (born December 26, 1978) is an American former left fielder in Major League Baseball. Thomas played with the Atlanta Braves (2004), and Oakland Athletics (2005). He batted and threw left-handed.

== Amateur career ==
Thomas played baseball and graduated from Asheville High School in Asheville, North Carolina. He would play collegiately at Western Carolina University. In 1999, he played collegiate summer baseball with the Orleans Cardinals of the Cape Cod Baseball League. He was selected by the Braves in the 19th round of the 2000 MLB draft.

== Professional career ==
He steadily improved while splitting time between two teams in 2003, hitting .324 in 47 games after being called up to Double-A Greenville. That season, he got a chance to play at Triple-A Richmond when Atlanta called up or released the outfielders ahead of him. Thomas took advantage of the opportunity. He went 31-for-79 (.379) in June, led the International League in hitting and on-base percentage, and was selected to the All-Star team.

Thomas started 2004 as the fourth outfielder for Richmond and made the big club in the mid-season. He posted a .288 batting average with seven home runs and 31 RBI in 83 games. He showed a great batting eye, speedy running, and outstanding defense.

At the 2004 Winter Meetings, the Braves traded Thomas and pitchers Juan Cruz and Dan Meyer to the Oakland Athletics for Tim Hudson.

In the 2005 season, he had a rough start and despite starting nearly every game went weeks without getting a hit. Eventually, Thomas was demoted to AAA, where he spent most of his remaining time in Oakland. On May 4, 2007, he was dealt to the Brewers in exchange for JD Closser. He played the rest of the 2007 season with Milwaukee's Triple-A club, the Nashville Sounds.
