= Toms Fork =

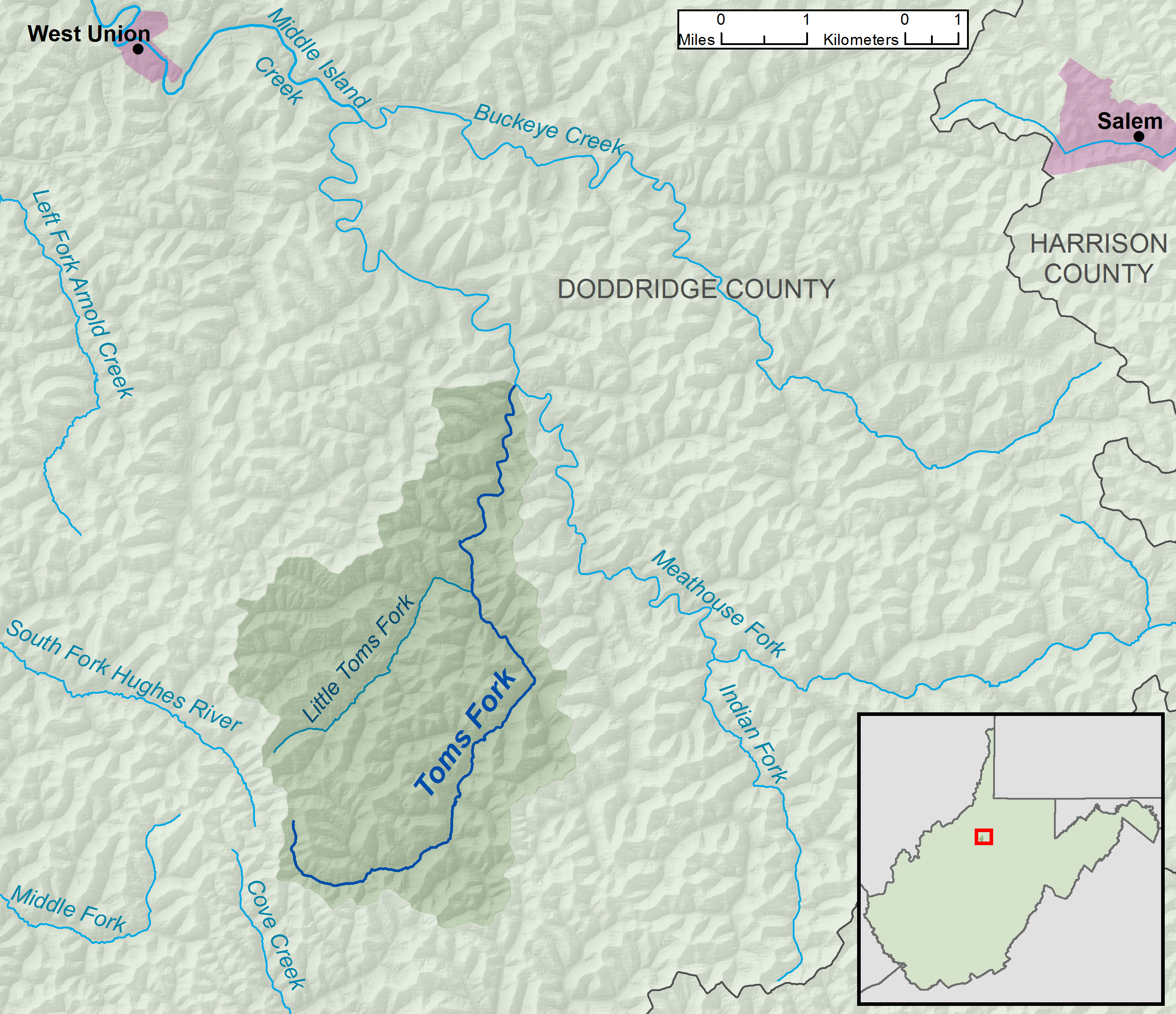
- A map of Toms Fork and its watershed

Location
- Country: United States
- State: West Virginia
- County: Doddridge

Physical characteristics
- Source
  - location: southeast of Porto Rico
  - coordinates: 39.1669444°N 80.7411111°W
  - elevation: 1,229 ft (375 m)
- Mouth: Meathouse Fork
  - location: Sugar Camp
  - coordinates: 39.2400859°N 80.6937130°W
  - elevation: 810 ft (250 m)
- Length: 9.3 mi (15.0 km)
- Basin size: 15.5 sq mi (40 km^{2})

Basin features
- Hydrologic Unit Code: 050302010401 (USGS)

Toms Fork is a tributary of the Meathouse Fork, 9.3 miles (15.0 km) long, in north-central West Virginia in the United States. Via the Meathouse Fork, Middle Island Creek, and the Ohio River, it is part of the watershed of the Mississippi River, draining an area of 15.5 square miles (40 km^{2}) in a rural region on the unglaciated portion of the Allegheny Plateau.

Toms Fork's course is entirely in southern Doddridge County. It rises approximately 1.6 miles (2.6 km) southeast of the unincorporated community of Porto Rico, and flows generally north-northeastward, through the unincorporated community of Market, to Sugar Camp, where it flows into the Meathouse Fork. Toms Fork is paralleled for most of its course by West Virginia Route 18. It collects its largest tributary, Little Toms Fork, at Market.

== See also ==
- List of rivers of West Virginia
