= Alexandria Community School Corporation =

School district in Madison County, Indiana, US

Alexandria Community School Corporation is a school district headquartered in Alexandria, Indiana.

The district includes Alexandria and Orestes.

== Schools ==
- Alexandria-Monroe Jr./Sr. High School
- Alexandria-Monroe Academy
- Alexandria-Monroe Elementary School
