= Alexandria Airport (Indiana) =

- IATA: none; ICAO: none; FAA LID: I99

Summary
- Airport type: Public
- Owner: Central Indiana Soaring Society
- Serves: Alexandria, Indiana
- Elevation AMSL: 900 ft (270 m)
- Coordinates: 40°13′57″N 085°38′15″W
- Interactive map of Alexandria Airport

Runways
Direction	Length		Surface
Direction	ft	m	Surface
9/27	2,591	790	Asphalt

Statistics (2005)
- Aircraft operations: 7,074
- Based aircraft: 18
- Source: Federal Aviation Administration

Alexandria Airport (FAA LID: I99) is a public use airport located three nautical miles (6 km) southeast of the central business district of Alexandria, a city in Madison County, Indiana, United States.

== History ==
Alexandria airport was started as a privately owned - public use airport in a field. In 2004, the 40-year-old Central Indiana Soaring Society rebased from Indianapolis Executive Airport. In 2007, the club rezoned the land for an airport, and purchased the airfield for its use.

== Facilities and aircraft ==
Alexandria Airport covers an area of 22 acres (8.9 ha) at an elevation of 900 feet (274 m) above mean sea level. It has one runway designated 9/27 with an asphalt surface measuring 2,591 by 60 feet (790 x 18 m).

For the 12-month period ending May 2, 2005, the airport had 7,074 general aviation aircraft operations, an average of 19 per day. At that time there were 18 aircraft based at this airport: 11% single-engine and 89% glider.

Since 2020, local paramotorists have enjoyed safe flights from Alexandria airfield, sharing the love of aviation on early mornings and late evenings when the thermals cease and the skies are friendly for ultralight operations.

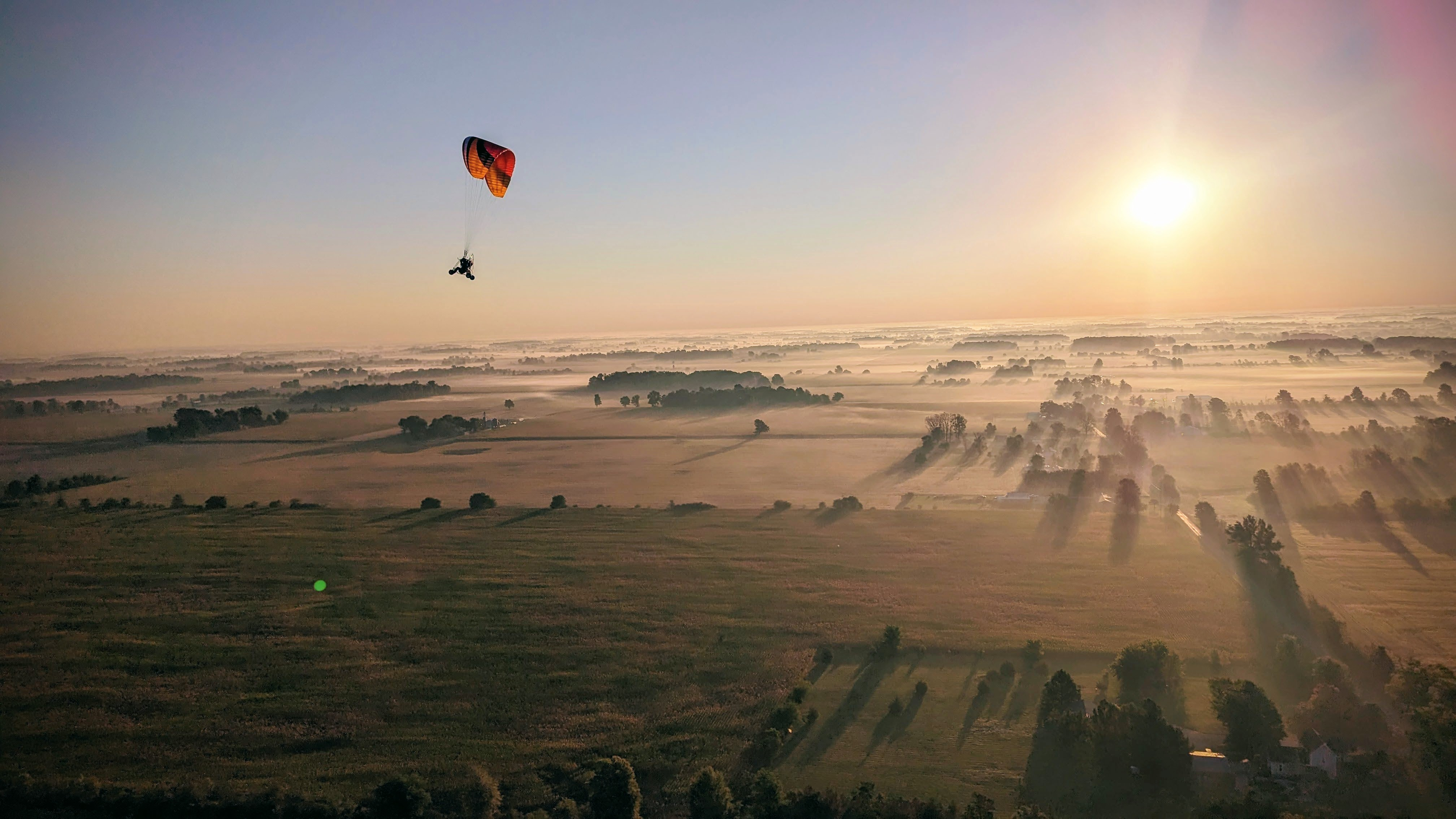
Paramotoring near Alexandria Airport

Unfortunately, the airport is currently restricting operations to only glider activities under threat of trespass to other aviators.

== See also ==
- List of airports in Indiana
