= Monroe Township, Madison County, Indiana =

Monroe Township
- Township
- Location in Madison County
- Coordinates: 40°15′52″N 85°39′28″W
- Country: United States
- State: Indiana
- County: Madison

Government
  - Type: Indiana township

Area
  - Total: 51.25 sq mi (132.7 km^{2})
  - Land: 51.22 sq mi (132.7 km^{2})
  - Water: 0.02 sq mi (0.052 km^{2}) 0.04%
- Elevation: 873 ft (266 m)

Population (2020)
  - Total: 8,777
  - Density: 171.5/sq mi (66.2/km^{2})
- ZIP codes: 46001, 46063, 46070
- GNIS feature ID: 0453642

Monroe Township is one of fourteen townships in Madison County, Indiana, United States. In the 2010 census, its population was 8,786 and it contained 4,098 housing units.

== History ==
Monroe Township was organized in 1836. It was named for President James Monroe.

== Geography ==
According to the 2010 census, the township has a total area of 51.25 square miles (132.7 km^{2}), of which 51.22 square miles (132.7 km^{2}) (or 99.94%) is land and 0.02 square miles (0.052 km^{2}) (or 0.04%) is water.

=== Cities, towns, villages ===
- Alexandria
- Orestes

=== Unincorporated towns ===
- Gehring and Gumz Ditch at 40.234486°N 85.578307°W
- Gimco City at 40.258374°N 85.683865°W
- Innisdale at 40.2574°N 85.6923°W

(This list is based on USGS data and may include former settlements.)

=== Cemeteries ===
The township contains these six cemeteries: Bell, Donahue, Parkview, Pisgah, Star and Walker.

=== Major highways ===
- Indiana State Road 9
- Indiana State Road 28

=== Airports and landing strips ===
- Alexandria Airport

== Education ==
- Alexandria Community School Corporation

Monroe Township residents may obtain a free library card from the Alexandria-Monroe Public Library in Alexandria.

== Political districts ==
- Indiana's 5th congressional district
- State House District 35
- State House District 36
- State Senate District 25
