= Buckeye Creek (West Virginia) =

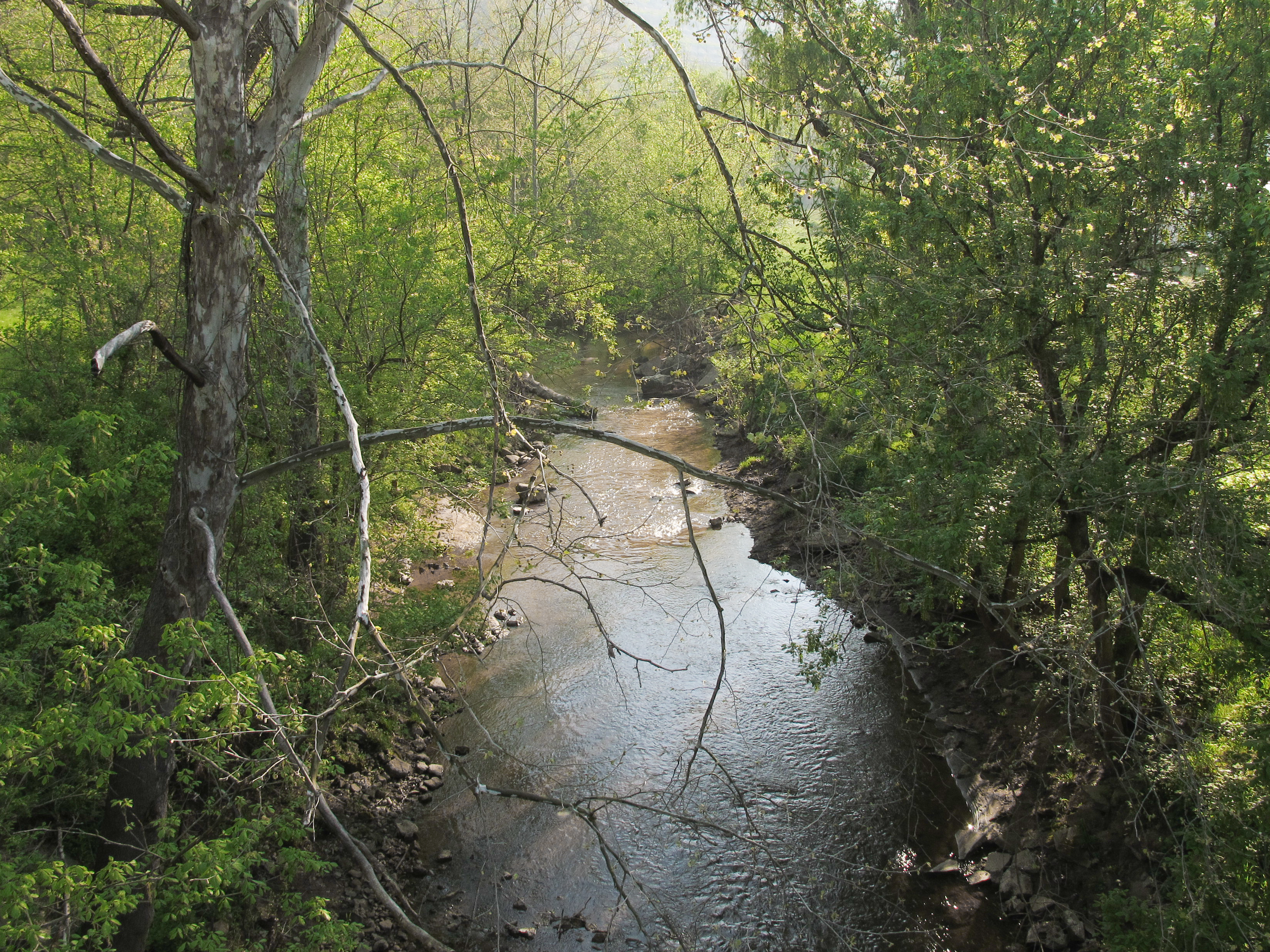
- Buckeye Creek east of Smithburg, West Virginia

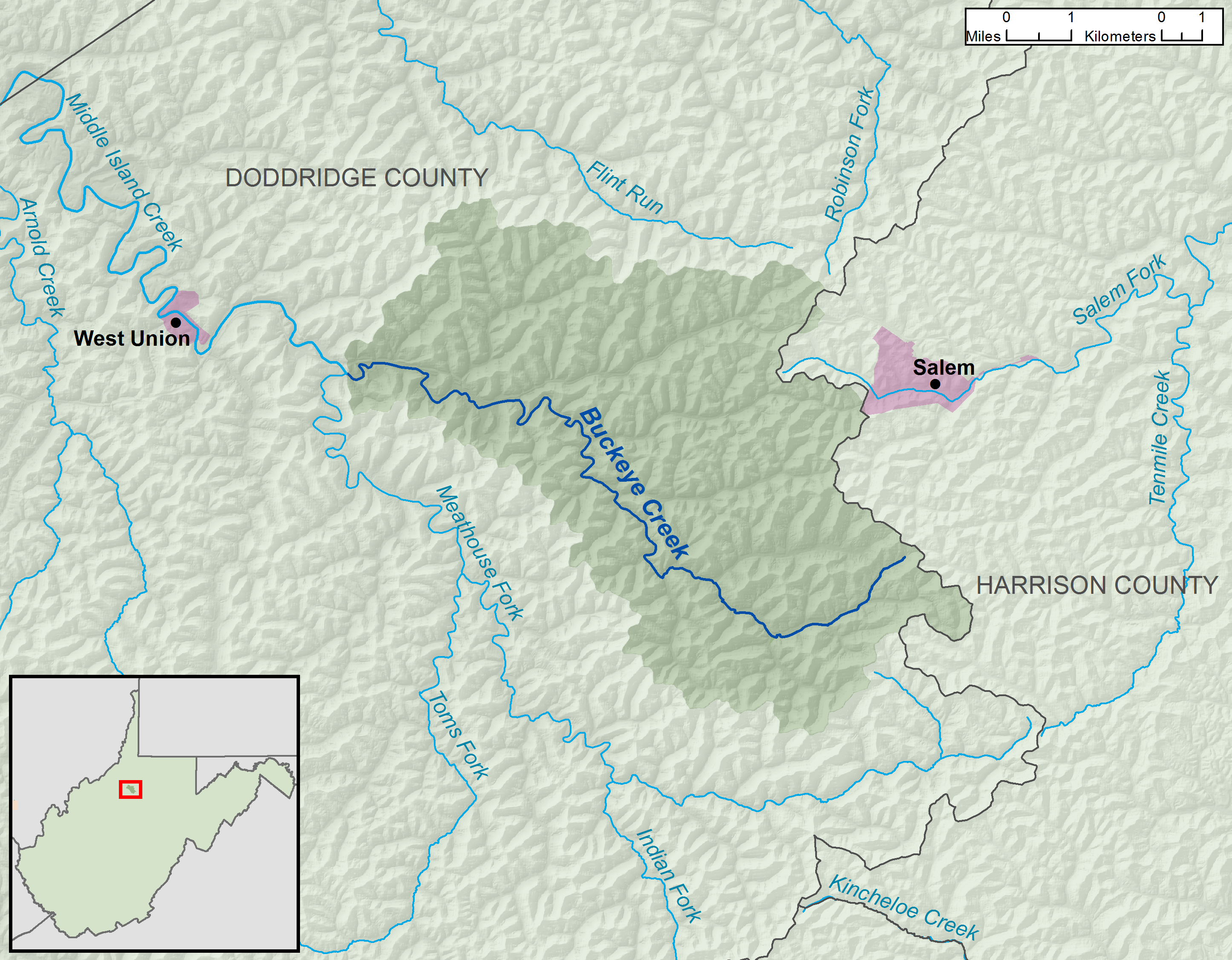
- Buckeye Creek and its watershed

Location
- Country: United States
- State: West Virginia
- County: Doddridge

Physical characteristics
- Source
  - location: northeast of Miletus
  - coordinates: 39.2456437°N 80.5645416°W
  - elevation: 1,145 ft (349 m)
- Mouth: Middle Island Creek
  - location: Smithburg
  - coordinates: 39.2842512°N 80.7281587°W
  - elevation: 794 ft (242 m)
- Length: 12.7 mi (20.4 km)
- Basin size: 39.1 sq mi (101 km^{2})

Basin features
- Hydrologic Unit Code: 050302010402 (USGS)

Buckeye Creek is a tributary of Middle Island Creek, 12.7 miles (20.4 km) long, in north-central West Virginia in the United States. Via Middle Island Creek and the Ohio River, it is part of the watershed of the Mississippi River, draining an area of 39.1 square miles (101 km^{2}) in a rural region on the unglaciated portion of the Allegheny Plateau.

Buckeye Creek's course is entirely in Doddridge County. It rises near the boundary of Doddridge and Harrison counties, approximately 1.6 miles (2.6 km) northeast of the unincorporated community of Miletus, and flows generally west-northwestward, through Miletus and the unincorporated communities of Zinnia, Nina, and Sherwood. Downstream of Sherwood, the stream is largely paralleled by U.S. Route 50 and the North Bend Rail Trail. It joins the Meathouse Fork to form Middle Island Creek at the community of Smithburg.

According to the Geographic Names Information System, Buckeye Creek has also been known historically by the name "Buckey Fork."

== See also ==
- List of rivers of West Virginia
