= Sherwood, West Virginia =

- Unincorporated community
- Location within the state of West Virginia Sherwood (the United States)
- Coordinates: 39°16′46″N 80°40′39″W
- Country: United States
- State: West Virginia
- County: Doddridge
- Elevation: 820 ft (250 m)
- Time zone: UTC-5 (Eastern (EST))
  - Summer (DST): UTC-4 (EDT)
- GNIS ID: 1549927

Sherwood is an unincorporated community in Doddridge County, West Virginia, United States, along Buckeye Creek.
