= Big Isaac, West Virginia =

Unincorporated community in West Virginia, United States

- Unincorporated community
- Location within West Virginia Location within the United States
- Coordinates: 39°12′00″N 80°32′19″W
- Country: United States
- State: West Virginia
- County: Doddridge
- Elevation: 984 ft (300 m)
- Time zone: UTC-5 (Eastern (EST))
  - Summer (DST): UTC-4 (EDT)
- Area codes: 304 & 681
- GNIS feature ID: 1535868

Big Isaac is an unincorporated community in Doddridge County, West Virginia, United States. Big Isaac is 6 miles (9.7 km) south-southeast of Salem, along Laurel Run, a headwaters tributary of Meathouse Fork. The Big Isaac post office closed on December 31, 1962.

According to tradition, the community bears the name of Periue "Big" Isaac, an early settler noted for his especially large shoe size.

== Gallery ==
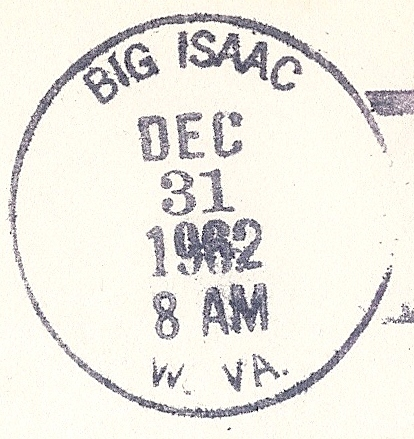
Big Isaac postmark
