= Miletus (Mysia) =

Coordinates: 39°31′42″N 26°58′27″E

Miletus or Miletos (Ancient Greek: Μίλητος) was a town of ancient Mysia, in the territory of Scepsis, on the river Evenus, which was destroyed as early as the time of Pliny the Elder.

The site of Miletus is tentatively located a near Uyuncak Köprü, over Havran Çay, in Anatolia.
