= Smithburg, West Virginia =

- Unincorporated community
- Nickname: Home of the Thellers
- Location within the state of West Virginia Smithburg (the United States)
- Coordinates: 39°17′21″N 80°44′4″W
- Country: United States
- State: West Virginia
- County: Doddridge
- Time zone: UTC-5 (Eastern (EST))
  - Summer (DST): UTC-4 (EDT)
- ZIP codes: 26436
- FIPS code: 1547006

Smithburg is an unincorporated community in Doddridge County in the U.S. state of West Virginia. It is located along U.S. Route 50. Middle Island Creek, the longest stream in West Virginia to be named a "creek," is formed in Smithburg by the confluence of Meathouse Fork and Buckeye Creek. The North Bend Rail Trail passes through the community.
