= Miletus (Paphlagonia) =

Miletus or Miletos (Ancient Greek: Μίλητος), was a town of ancient Paphlagonia, located on the road between Amastris and Sinope.

The site of Miletus is unlocated.
