= Blandville, West Virginia =

Unincorporated community in West Virginia, United States

- Unincorporated community
- Location within West Virginia Location within the United States
- Coordinates: 39°15′24″N 80°42′38″W
- Country: United States
- State: West Virginia
- County: Doddridge
- Elevation: 807 ft (246 m)
- Time zone: UTC-5 (Eastern (EST))
  - Summer (DST): UTC-4 (EDT)
- Area codes: 304 & 681
- GNIS feature ID: 1536087

Blandville is an unincorporated community in Doddridge County, West Virginia, United States. Blandville is located along West Virginia Route 18 and Meathouse Fork, 4.5 miles (7.2 km) southeast of West Union. Blandville had a post office, which closed on November 9, 2002.
