= Alexandria, Indiana =

- City
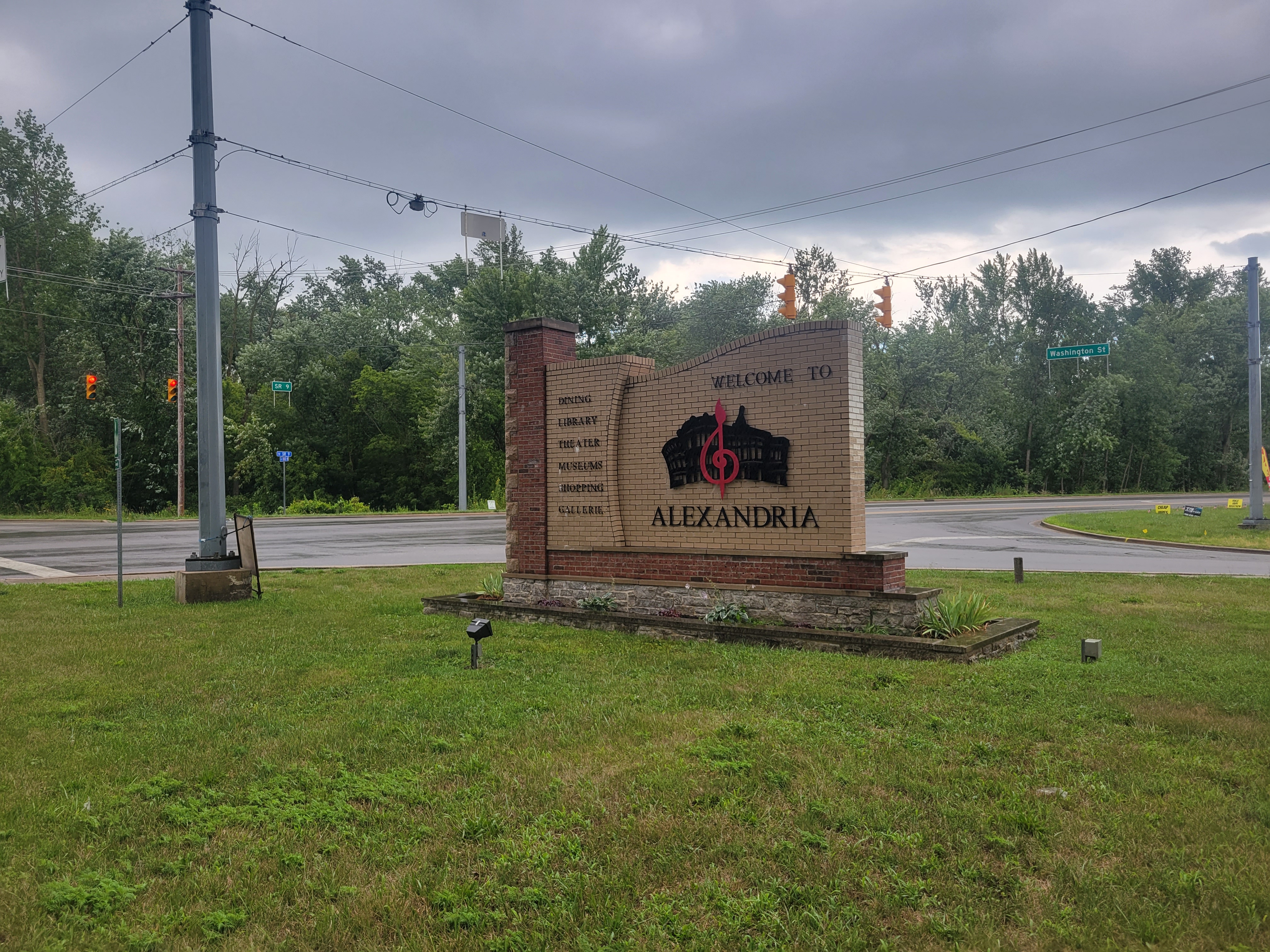

- Seal
- Nickname: "Small Town USA"
- Location in Madison County, Indiana

- Location within Indiana Location within the United States Location within North America
- Coordinates: 40°15′17″N 85°40′23″W
- Country: United States
- State: Indiana
- County: Madison
- Township: Monroe
- Established: 1836
- Incorporated: 1898

Government
  - Mayor: Todd Naselroad (R)

Area
  - Total: 3.02 sq mi (7.83 km^{2})
  - Land: 3.02 sq mi (7.83 km^{2})
  - Water: 0 sq mi (0.00 km^{2})
- Elevation: 869 ft (265 m)

Population (2020)
  - Total: 5,149
  - Estimate (2025): 5,197 ▲
  - Density: 1,702.3/sq mi (657.25/km^{2})
- Time zone: UTC-5 (EST)
  - Summer (DST): UTC-4 (EDT)
- ZIP code: 46001
- Area code: 765
- FIPS code: 18-00910
- GNIS feature ID: 2393917
- Website: www.in.gov/cities/alexandria

Alexandria is a city in Monroe Township, Madison County, Indiana, United States. It is about 48 miles (77 km) northeast of Indianapolis. According to the 2020 census, its population was 5,149, nearly unchanged from 2010.

== History ==
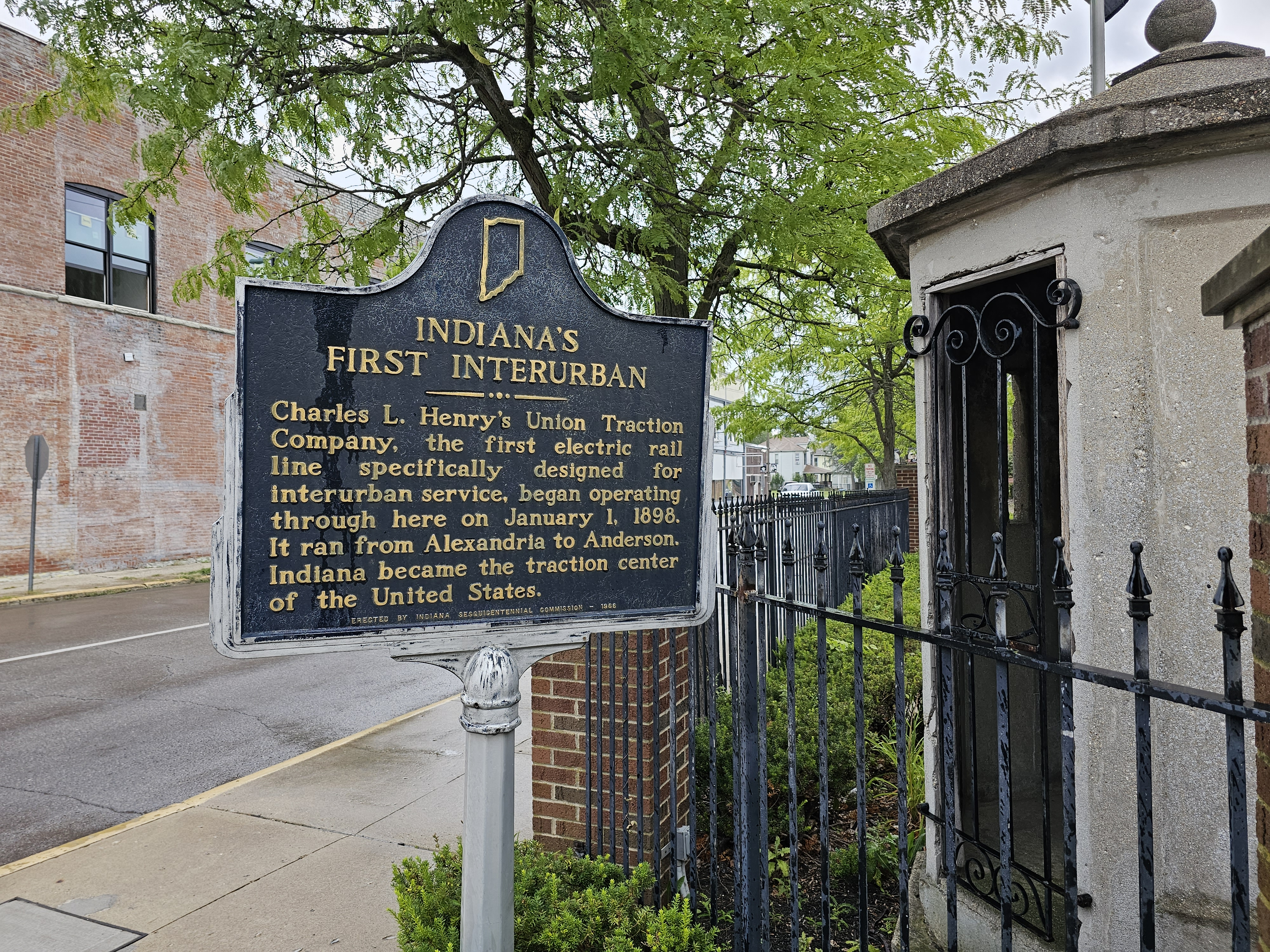
Historical marker about Indiana's First Interurban Railway line.

Alexandria was platted in 1836, when it was certain that the Indiana Central Canal would be extended to that point. It was incorporated as a town in 1898.

In 1898, Indiana's first Interurban railway line began operating between Alexandria and Anderson.

== Geography ==
Alexandria is located in northern Madison County. Indiana State Road 9 passes through the east side of the city, leading south 11 miles (18 km) to Anderson, the county seat, and north 21 miles (34 km) to Marion. State Road 28 crosses the northern tip of Alexandria, leading west 9 miles (14 km) to Elwood and east 23 miles (37 km) to Albany.

According to the U.S. Census Bureau, Alexandria has a total area of 3.0 square miles (7.8 km^{2}), all land. Pipe Creek crosses the city south of its center, flowing southwest to join the White River at Perkinsville.

== Demographics ==
Historical population
Census	Pop.	Note	%±
1870	287		—
1880	488		70.0%
1890	715		46.5%
1900	7,221		909.9%
1910	5,096		−29.4%
1920	4,172		−18.1%
1930	4,408		5.7%
1940	4,801		8.9%
1950	5,147		7.2%
1960	5,582		8.5%
1970	5,600		0.3%
1980	6,028		7.6%
1990	5,709		−5.3%
2000	6,260		9.7%
2010	5,145		−17.8%
2020	5,149		0.1%
2025 (est.)	5,197		0.9%
U.S. Decennial Census

Alexandria is part of the Indianapolis–Carmel–Anderson metropolitan statistical area.

=== 2020 census ===
As of the 2020 census, Alexandria had a population of 5,149. The median age was 38.4 years. 24.8% of residents were under the age of 18 and 16.6% of residents were 65 years of age or older. For every 100 females there were 95.3 males, and for every 100 females age 18 and over there were 87.8 males age 18 and over.

99.2% of residents lived in urban areas, while 0.8% lived in rural areas.

There were 2,142 households in Alexandria, of which 32.2% had children under the age of 18 living in them. Of all households, 38.5% were married-couple households, 20.3% were households with a male householder and no spouse or partner present, and 32.3% were households with a female householder and no spouse or partner present. About 32.2% of all households were made up of individuals and 14.0% had someone living alone who was 65 years of age or older.

There were 2,524 housing units, of which 15.1% were vacant. The homeowner vacancy rate was 1.9% and the rental vacancy rate was 12.0%.

Racial composition as of the 2020 census
Race	Number	Percent
White	4,756	92.4%
Black or African American	40	0.8%
American Indian and Alaska Native	3	0.1%
Asian	13	0.3%
Native Hawaiian and Other Pacific Islander	0	0.0%
Some other race	60	1.2%
Two or more races	277	5.4%
Hispanic or Latino (of any race)	151	2.9%

=== 2010 census ===
As of the census of 2010, there were 5,145 people, 2,113 households, and 1,362 families living in the city. The population density was 1,956.3 inhabitants per square mile (755.3/km^{2}). There were 2,507 housing units at an average density of 953.2 per square mile (368.0/km^{2}). The racial makeup of the city was 97.4% White, 0.3% African American, 0.1% Native American, 0.2% Asian, 0.8% from other races, and 1.1% from two or more races. Hispanic or Latino people of any race were 1.7% of the population.

Of the 2,113 households 33.6% had children under the age of 18 living with them, 42.2% were married couples living together, 15.7% had a female householder with no husband present, 6.6% had a male householder with no wife present, and 35.5% were non-families. 30.1% of households were one person and 12.8% were one person aged 65 or older. The average household size was 2.41 and the average family size was 2.95.

The median age was 38.2 years. 25.6% of residents were under the age of 18; 8.8% were between the ages of 18 and 24; 24.8% were from 25 to 44; 25.1% were from 45 to 64; and 15.6% were 65 or older. The gender makeup of the city was 47.8% male and 52.2% female.

=== 2000 census ===
As of the census of 2000, there were 6,260 people, 2,481 households, and 1,654 families living in the city. The population density was 2,308.6 inhabitants per square mile (891.4/km^{2}). There were 2,704 housing units at an average density of 997.2 per square mile (385.0/km^{2}). The racial makeup of the city was 98.10% White, 0.46% Black or African American, 0.08% Native American, 0.11% Asian, 0.02% Pacific Islander, 0.43% from other races, and 0.80% from two or more races. 0.99% of the population were Hispanic or Latino of any race.

Of the 2,481 households 33.9% had children under the age of 18 living with them, 49.0% were married couples living together, 12.7% had a female householder with no husband present, and 33.3% were non-families. 28.9% of households were one person and 13.1% were one person aged 65 or older. The average household size was 2.48 and the average family size was 3.04.

The age distribution was 27.8% under the age of 18, 8.9% from 18 to 24, 28.0% from 25 to 44, 19.5% from 45 to 64, and 15.9% 65 or older. The median age was 35 years. For every 100 females, there were 91.4 males. For every 100 females age 18 and over, there were 87.4 males.

The median household income was $35,359 and the median family income was $42,731. Males had a median income of $30,529 versus $23,384 for females. The per capita income for the city was $15,578. About 4.2% of families and 7.0% of the population were below the poverty line, including 4.1% of those under age 18 and 15.0% of those age 65 or over.

== Government ==
The city council consists of seven members. Five members are elected from individual districts, and two are elected at large. The city is governed by a "strong" mayor system that appoints two council members and/or city residents to serve at the mayor's pleasure on the board of public works and safety. The chief financial officer is the clerk-treasurer. The clerk-treasurer and mayor are full-time elected officials.

== Transportation ==
=== Airport ===
Alexandria Airport is a public use airport located 3 miles (5 km) southeast of the central business district of Alexandria.

== Education ==
It is in the Alexandria Community School Corporation.

The town has a lending library, the Alexandria-Monroe Public Library.

== Notable people ==
- Joey Feek, country singer
- Bill Gaither, gospel singer/songwriter
- Danny Gaither, gospel singer
- Gloria Gaither, author/lyricist, gospel singer
- Robert L. Rock, politician

== Gallery ==
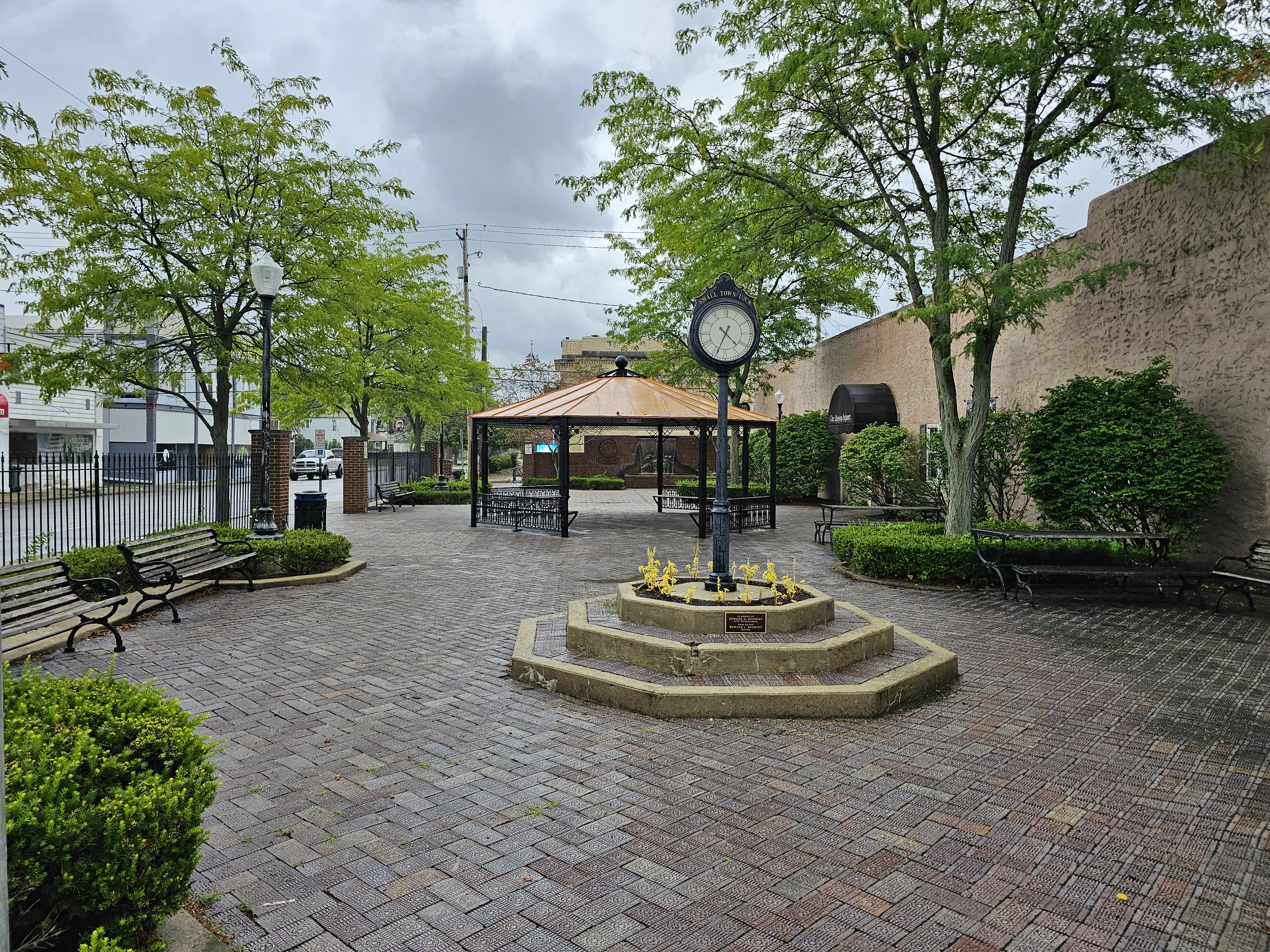
Clock in Alexandria, Indiana

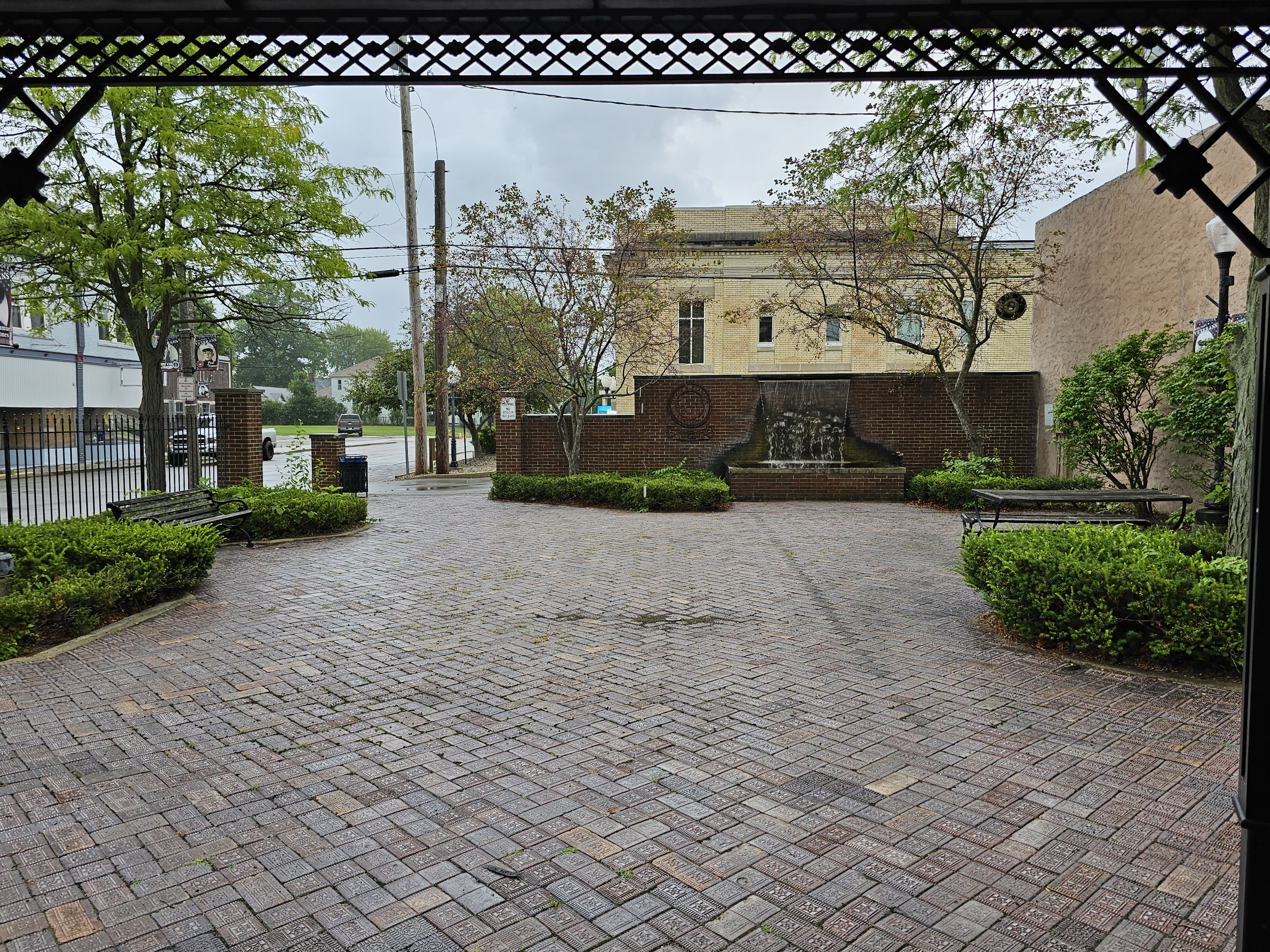
Fountain in park in Alexandria

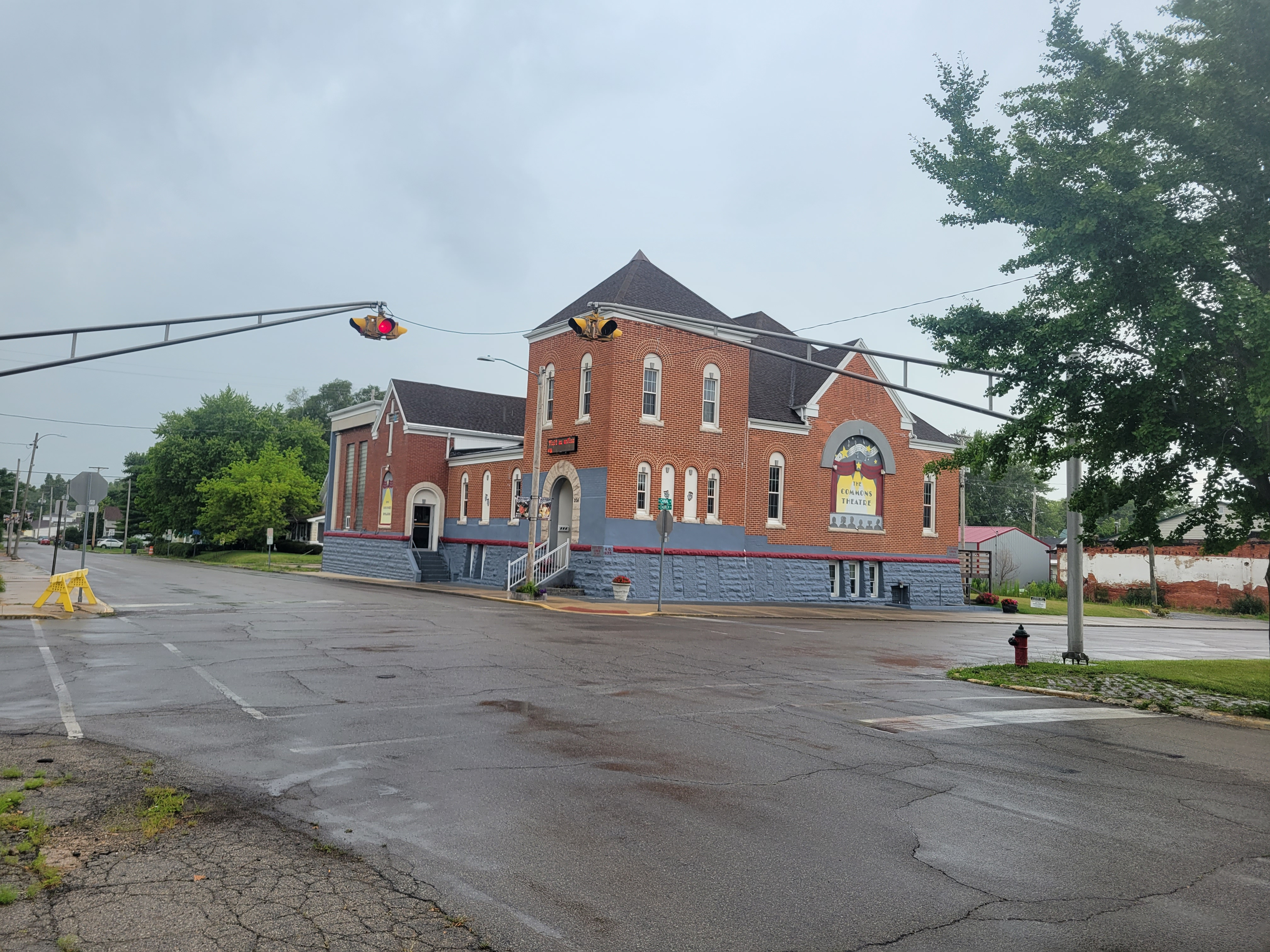
The Commons Theatre in Alexandria Indiana

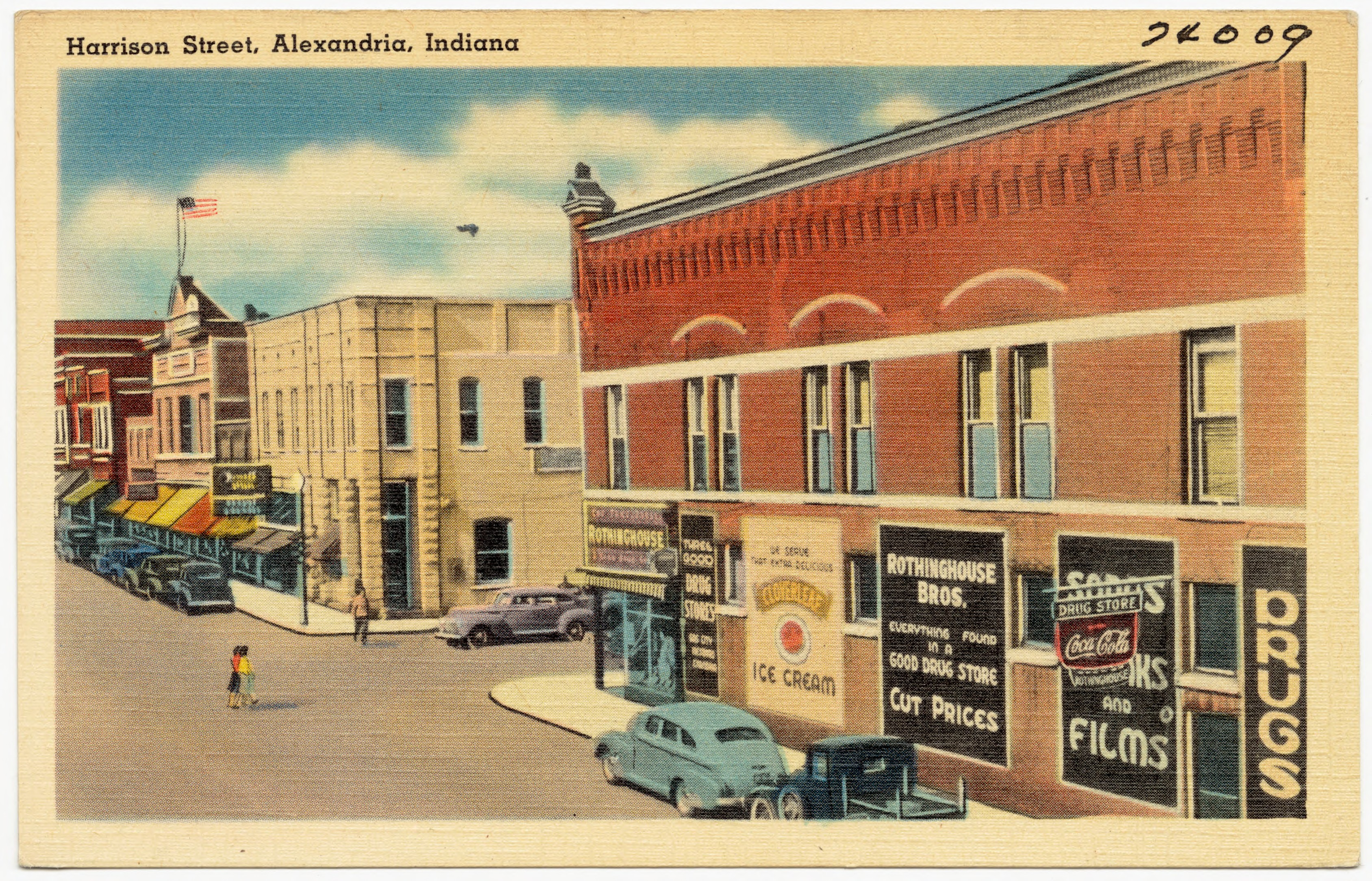
Harrison Street in Alexandria, circa 1930–1945

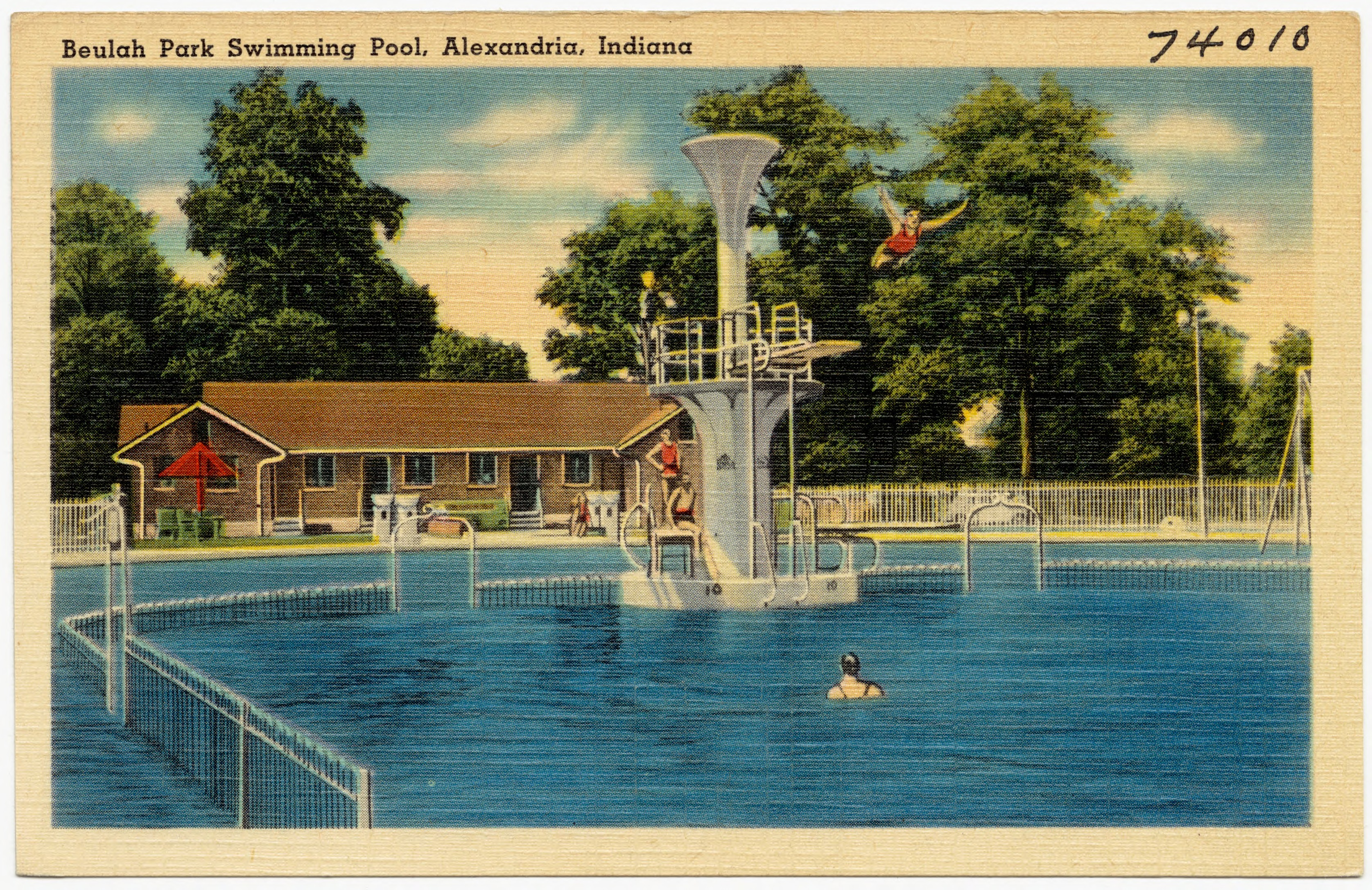
Beulah Park Swimming Pool in Alexandria, circa 1930–1945

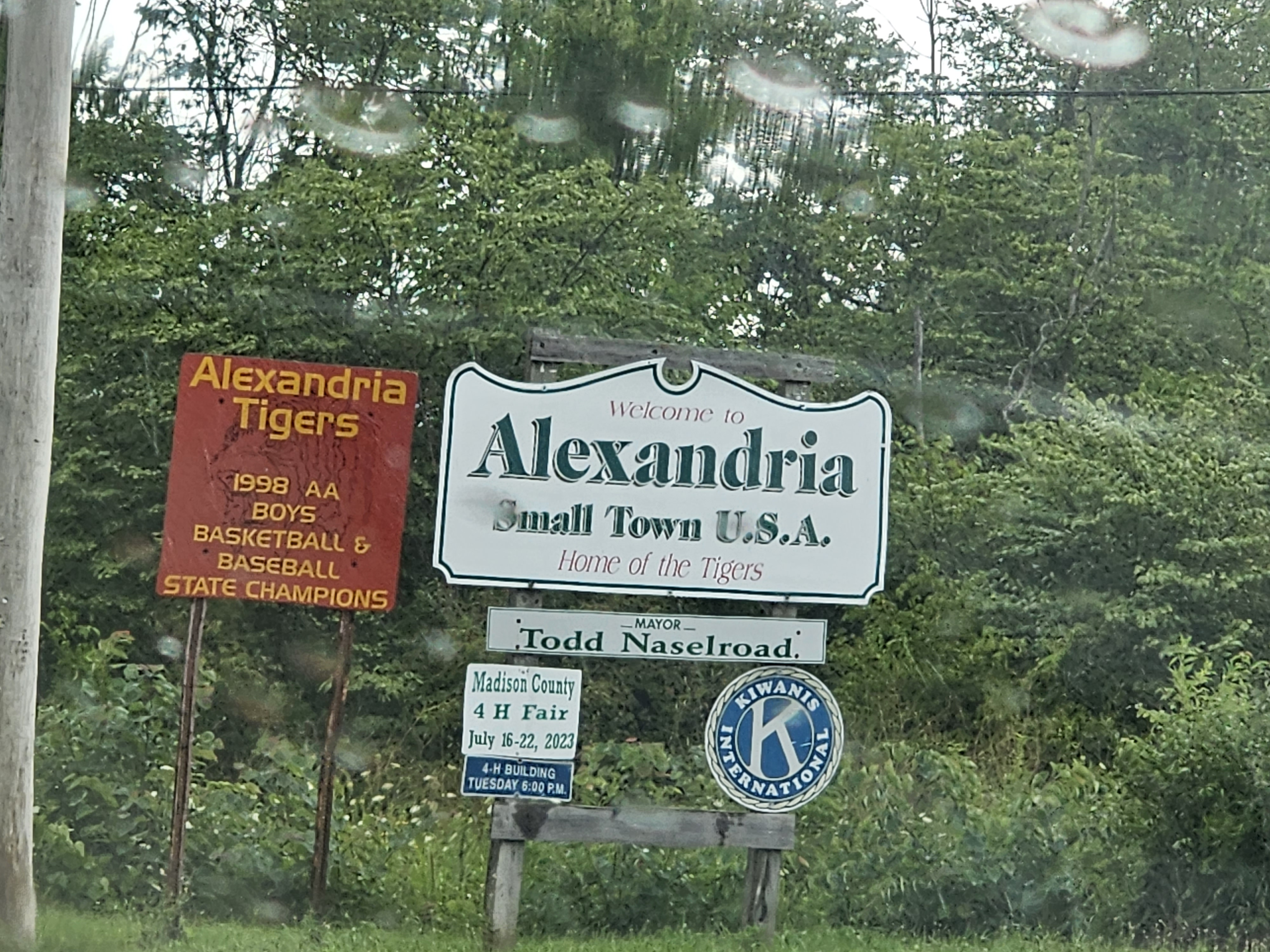
Welcome to Alexandria
