= Politics of West Virginia =

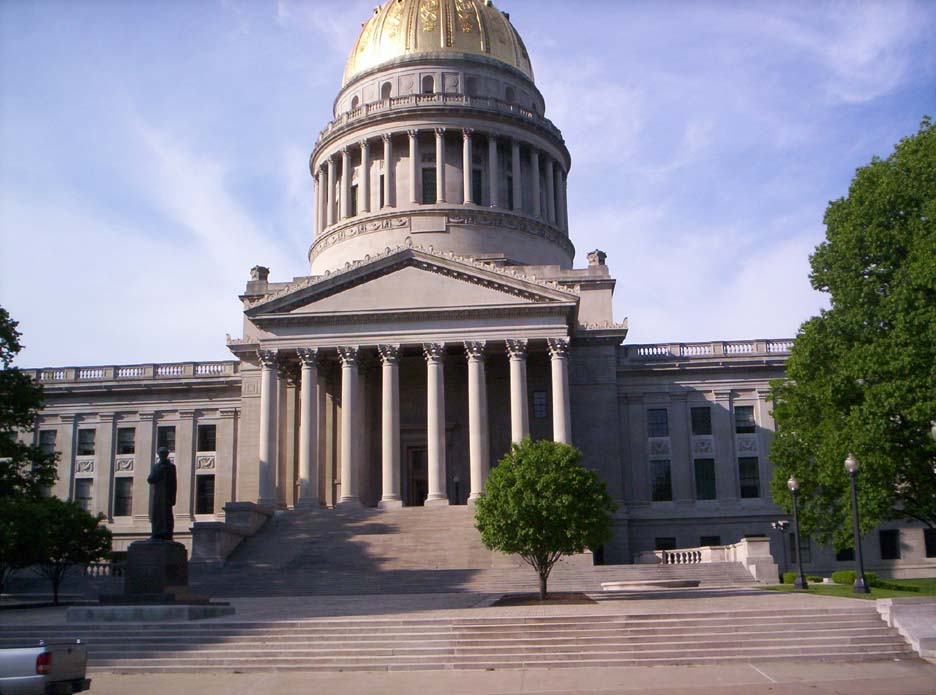
The West Virginia State Capitol

From the time of the Great Depression through the 1990s, the politics of West Virginia were largely dominated by the Democratic Party. In the 2000 presidential election, George W. Bush claimed a surprise victory over Al Gore, with 52% of the vote; he won West Virginia again in 2004, with 56% of the vote. West Virginia is now a heavily Republican state, with John McCain winning the state in 2008, Mitt Romney in 2012 and Donald Trump in 2016, 2020, and 2024.

Before 2000, West Virginia had voted almost exclusively Democratic in each presidential election starting in 1932, only voting Republican amidst national landslides in 1956, 1972, and 1984. However starting with the 2000 election, West Virginia began a sharp realignment from mostly supporting Democrats to mostly supporting Republicans. By the 2010s, the state had become at the presidential level one of the most Republican in the nation. By 2015, Republicans had gained one of the state's two Senate seats, all its U.S. House seats, and both chambers of the state legislature.

In the 2016 presidential election, Donald Trump took an overwhelming victory in West Virginia, garnering 68.5% of the state's vote, his best performance of any state. Despite this, Democratic candidate Jim Justice was elected governor on the same ballot, marking five consecutive Democratic gubernatorial victories in the state. However, seven months into his term, Justice switched affiliation to the Republican Party, leaving Joe Manchin and John Perdue as the only Democrats holding statewide office in West Virginia. In 2020, Trump again carried West Virginia in a landslide, taking 68.6% of the state's vote, only less than longstanding Republican stronghold Wyoming. Perdue lost reelection as State Treasurer after serving six terms, leaving Manchin as the only remaining statewide Democrat until his departure from the party in 2024. Manchin won his last U.S. Senate reelection campaign by 3% in 2018, a sharp decline from his 24% margin of victory in 2012. He did not seek reelection in 2024, and the seat was won by then-Republican Jim Justice, the first time since 1931 that both of West Virginians Senate seats were held by Republicans. (Note: Republicans technically held both of West Virginia's Senate seats in 1958 when Republican John Hoblitzell was appointed to continue the term of Democrat Matthew M. Neely before losing his bid to finish Neely's term in a special election the same year.)

In a 2020 study, West Virginia was ranked as the 16th hardest state for citizens to vote in.

== History ==
United States presidential election results for West Virginia
Year	Republican		Democratic		Third party(ies)	
Year	No.	%	No.	%	No.	%
1864	23,799	68.24%	11,078	31.76%	0	0.00%
1868	29,015	58.83%	20,306	41.17%	0	0.00%
1872	32,320	51.74%	29,532	47.28%	615	0.98%
1876	41,997	42.15%	56,546	56.75%	1,104	1.11%
1880	46,243	41.05%	57,390	50.95%	9,008	8.00%
1884	63,096	47.75%	67,311	50.94%	1,738	1.32%
1888	78,171	49.03%	78,677	49.35%	2,592	1.63%
1892	80,292	46.93%	84,467	49.37%	6,320	3.69%
1896	105,379	52.23%	94,480	46.83%	1,898	0.94%
1900	119,829	54.27%	98,807	44.75%	2,160	0.98%
1904	132,620	55.26%	100,855	42.03%	6,511	2.71%
1908	137,869	53.42%	111,418	43.17%	8,818	3.42%
1912	56,754	21.11%	113,197	42.11%	98,877	36.78%
1916	143,124	49.38%	140,403	48.44%	6,325	2.18%
1920	282,007	55.30%	220,789	43.30%	7,146	1.40%
1924	288,635	49.45%	257,232	44.07%	37,795	6.48%
1928	375,551	58.43%	263,784	41.04%	3,417	0.53%
1932	330,731	44.47%	405,124	54.47%	7,919	1.06%
1936	325,358	39.20%	502,582	60.56%	2,005	0.24%
1940	372,414	42.90%	495,662	57.10%	0	0.00%
1944	322,819	45.11%	392,777	54.89%	0	0.00%
1948	316,251	42.24%	429,188	57.32%	3,311	0.44%
1952	419,970	48.08%	453,578	51.92%	0	0.00%
1956	449,297	54.08%	381,534	45.92%	0	0.00%
1960	395,995	47.27%	441,786	52.73%	0	0.00%
1964	253,953	32.06%	538,087	67.94%	0	0.00%
1968	307,555	40.78%	374,091	49.60%	72,560	9.62%
1972	484,964	63.61%	277,435	36.39%	0	0.00%
1976	314,760	41.93%	435,914	58.07%	0	0.00%
1980	334,206	45.30%	367,462	49.81%	36,047	4.89%
1984	405,483	55.11%	328,125	44.60%	2,134	0.29%
1988	310,065	47.46%	341,016	52.20%	2,230	0.34%
1992	241,974	35.39%	331,001	48.41%	110,736	16.20%
1996	233,946	36.76%	327,812	51.51%	74,701	11.74%
2000	336,475	51.92%	295,497	45.59%	16,152	2.49%
2004	423,778	56.06%	326,541	43.20%	5,568	0.74%
2008	397,466	55.58%	303,857	42.49%	13,800	1.93%
2012	417,655	62.14%	238,269	35.45%	16,195	2.41%
2016	489,371	67.85%	188,794	26.18%	43,096	5.98%
2020	545,382	68.62%	235,984	29.69%	13,365	1.68%
2024	533,556	69.97%	214,309	28.10%	14,719	1.93%

Robert C. Byrd, a Democrat, represented the state of West Virginia in Congress for over 57 years, as a Member of the House from the now-defunct 6th District from 1953 to 1959, and as a United States Senator from 1959 to 2010. He served as Democratic Senate Leader from 1977 to 1989. In 2006 he became the longest-serving Senator in history, and in 2009 the longest-serving member of Congress in history. Senator Byrd died of pneumonia on June 28, 2010, aged 92. Governor Joe Manchin appointed Carte Goodwin to fill the seat until a special election was held in November 2010. Manchin was elected to the seat to fulfill the remainder of Byrd's term.

In the Republican landslide of 1988, it was one of only ten states, and the only southern state (as defined by the United States Census), to support Michael Dukakis; it was one of only six states to support Jimmy Carter over Ronald Reagan in 1980; and it supported Bill Clinton by large margins in both 1992 and 1996. The state has trended increasingly Republican in presidential elections; despite the earlier Democratic wins in presidential match-ups, it narrowly elected George W. Bush over Al Gore in 2000, then re-elected Bush by a much larger margin in 2004 and voted for John McCain in 2008 by a slightly larger margin than 2004. West Virginia was one of only 5 states, the others being Arkansas, Louisiana, Oklahoma and Tennessee, where McCain won by a larger margin in 2008 than George W. Bush in 2004. Mitt Romney won the state in the 2012 presidential election with 62% of the vote, a significant improvement over McCain's 56% vote share in 2008 and the first time in American history that a candidate for president won every county in the state. Republican presidential candidate Donald Trump won the state with a 42% margin, outdoing Romney's performance substantially.

In the 2014 elections, the GOP took control of the state legislature for the first time in 80 years, and it took one of West Virginia's two U.S. Senate seats and all three U.S. House districts. In the 2016 elections, the Republicans held on to their seats and made gains in the State Senate and gained three statewide offices.

West Virginia's U.S. Senators are Republicans Shelley Moore Capito and Jim Justice. The two seats in the United States House of Representatives are occupied by Republicans Alex Mooney, and Carol Miller. Republicans also maintain strong positions in statewide offices and the state legislature. Democrats continue to hold many local offices. West Virginia also has a very strong tradition of union membership.

Democratic politicians in the state are typically more conservative than the national party, especially on social issues. The late Senator Robert Byrd opposed affirmative action and same-sex marriage. Former Senator and Governor Joe Manchin and former Congressman Nick Rahall are anti-abortion. National Democrats such as Barack Obama, Nancy Pelosi and Harry Reid are extremely unpopular in West Virginia. As of late 2011, President Obama had a 24% approval rating in the state, with 76% disapproving During his 2010 Senate campaign, then-Governor Joe Manchin released an ad touting his endorsement from the Republican-leaning NRA and slamming Obama's then-proposed cap and trade legislation.

=== Voter registration ===
Voter registration as of October 13, 2026
Party	Total voters	Percentage
Republican	527,532	43.59%
Democratic	326,697	26.99%
Unaffiliated	307,373	25.40%
Minor parties	35,009	2.89%
Libertarian	10,876	0.90%
Mountain	2,810	0.23%
Total	1,210,297	100%

== Demographics ==
Evangelical Christians comprised 52 percent of the state's voters in 2008. A poll in 2005 showed that 53 percent of West Virginia voters are anti-abortion, the seventh highest in the country. In 2018, West Virginia voters adopted a No Right to Abortion in Constitution Measure, which passed with 51.73% of the vote, a contrast to other conservative-leaning states in Appalachia which have rejected similar amendments or passed referendums codifying abortion up to viability. 3 In 2006, only 16 percent favored gay marriage. In 2008, 58 percent favored troop withdrawal from Iraq while just 32 percent wanted troops to remain. On fiscal policy in 2008, 52 percent said raising taxes on the wealthier individuals would benefit the economy, while 45 percent disagreed.

The most consistent support for Democrats historically was found in the larger cities of state as well the coal fields of Southern West Virginia (McDowell, Mingo, Logan, Wyoming, and Boone Counties), but the coal-field counties have become some of the most Republican-dominated areas in the nation at the presidential level. Republicans are also the majority to the east of the Allegheny Mountains, including the state's eastern panhandle and Potomac Highlands, as well as in the Huntington and Charleston suburbs, most typified in Putnam County. The farming region of the Mid-Ohio Valley, particularly Wood, Jackson, and Mason Counties, also historically leaned Republican and continue to do so today. The northern panhandle and North-Central West Virginia regions once leaned Democratic, especially in local and state elections, but has become dominated by Republicans in recent elections. Nonetheless, Monongalia County, home to Morgantown, where West Virginia University is located, remains competitive at the federal and state level, and Jefferson County, in the eastern panhandle, although Republican-leaning remains somewhat competitive in state and federal elections due to its location near Washington D.C. Kanawha County, home to Charleston, also has remained somewhat competitive in state and local elections, but leans Republican at the federal level, although to a lesser degree than more rural counties nearby. Coal interests have contributed more than $4 million to candidates for governor, the state Supreme Court and the West Virginia Legislature. The 2004 election was a record-setter for the coal industry. Gov. Joe Manchin received $571,214 from coal interests for his campaign and $174,500 for his inaugural. West Virginians for Coal, the West Virginia Coal Association's political action committee, contributed more money than any other coal industry donor.

== Federal representation ==
=== Senate ===
- Shelley Moore Capito (R)
- Jim Justice (R)

=== House of Representatives ===
- Carol Miller (R)
- Riley Moore (R)

=== Judiciary ===
West Virginia is part of the United States District Court for the Northern District of West Virginia and the United States District Court for the Southern District of West Virginia in the federal judiciary. The district's cases are appealed to the Richmond-based United States Court of Appeals for the Fourth Circuit.

== See also ==
- United States presidential elections in West Virginia
- Political party strength in West Virginia
- Government of West Virginia
