= 2016 United States presidential election in West Virginia =

- November 8, 2016
- Turnout: 57.45%

Nominee	Donald Trump	Hillary Clinton
Party	Republican	Democratic
Home state	New York	New York
Running mate	Mike Pence	Tim Kaine
Electoral vote	5	0
Popular vote	489,371	188,794
Percentage	68.50%	26.43%

Trump
40–50%
50–60%
60–70%
70–80%
80–90%
90–100%
Clinton
40–50%
50–60%
60–70%
70–80%
80–90%
90–100%
President before election
Barack Obama
Democratic
Elected President
Donald Trump
Republican

Treemap of the popular vote by county

The 2016 United States presidential election in West Virginia was held on November 8, 2016, as part of the 2016 general election in which all 50 states plus the District of Columbia participated. West Virginia voters chose electors to represent them in the Electoral College via a popular vote pitting the Republican nominee, businessman Donald Trump, and running mate Indiana Governor Mike Pence against Democratic nominee, former Secretary of State Hillary Clinton and her running mate, Virginia Senator Tim Kaine. Trump won West Virginia with 68.5% of the vote, his largest vote share in any state during the election. Clinton received just over a quarter of the vote, with 26.4%.

On May 10, 2016, in the presidential primaries, West Virginia voters expressed their preferences for the Democratic, Republican, Green, and Libertarian parties' respective nominees for president. Registered members of each party only voted in their party's primary, while voters who were unaffiliated chose any one primary in which to vote.

== Primary elections ==
=== Democratic primary ===
County results of the West Virginia Democratic presidential primary, 2016 Bernie Sanders

Six candidates appeared on the Democratic presidential primary ballot (alphabetically):

- Hillary Clinton
- Rocky De La Fuente
- Paul T. Farrell Jr.
- Keith Judd
- Martin O'Malley (withdrawn)
- Bernie Sanders

West Virginia Democratic primary, May 10, 2016
Candidate	Popular vote		Delegates		
Candidate	Count	Percentage	Pledged	Unpledged	Total
Bernie Sanders	124,700	51.41%	18		18
Hillary Clinton	86,914	35.84%	11	8	19
Paul T. Farrell Jr.	21,694	8.94%			
Keith Judd	4,460	1.84%			
Martin O'Malley (withdrawn)	3,796	1.57%			
Rocky De La Fuente	975	0.40%			
Uncommitted	—N/a		0	0	0
Total	242,539	100%	29	8	37

=== Republican primary ===
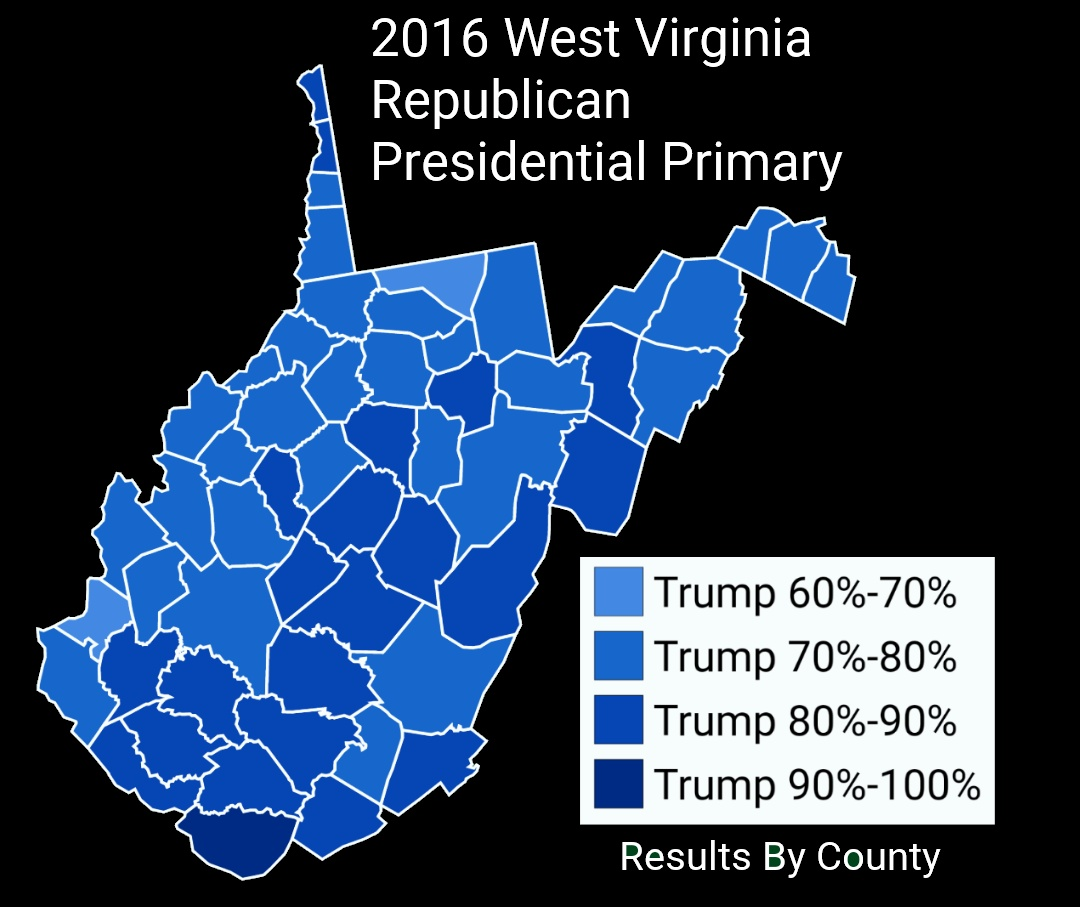
County results of the West Virginia Republican presidential primary, 2016 Donald Trump

Eleven candidates appeared on the Republican presidential primary ballot:

- Jeb Bush (withdrawn)
- Ben Carson (withdrawn)
- Chris Christie (withdrawn)
- Ted Cruz (withdrawn)
- Carly Fiorina (withdrawn)
- Mike Huckabee (withdrawn)
- John Kasich (withdrawn)
- Rand Paul (withdrawn)
- Marco Rubio (withdrawn)
- Donald Trump

West Virginia Republican primary, May 10, 2016
Candidate	Votes	Percentage	Actual delegate count		
Candidate	Votes	Percentage	Bound	Unbound	Total
Donald Trump	157,238	77.05%	30	0	30
Ted Cruz (withdrawn)	18,301	8.97%	0	0	0
John Kasich (withdrawn)	13,721	6.72%	1	0	1
Ben Carson (withdrawn)	4,421	2.17%	0	0	0
Marco Rubio (withdrawn)	2,908	1.43%	0	0	0
Jeb Bush (withdrawn)	2,305	1.13%	0	0	0
Rand Paul (withdrawn)	1,798	0.88%	0	0	0
Mike Huckabee (withdrawn)	1,780	0.87%	0	0	0
Chris Christie (withdrawn)	727	0.36%	0	0	0
Carly Fiorina (withdrawn)	659	0.32%	0	0	0
David Eames Hall	203	0.10%	0	0	0
Uncommitted			3	0	3
Unprojected delegates:			0	0	0
Total:	204,061	100.00%	34	0	34
Source: The Green Papers

== General election ==
State senate district results: Trump 50–60% 60–70% 70–80% 80–90%

=== Predictions ===
Source	Ranking	As of
Los Angeles Times	Safe R	November 6, 2016
CNN	Safe R	November 4, 2016
Cook Political Report	Safe R	November 7, 2016
Electoral-vote.com	Safe R	November 8, 2016
Rothenberg Political Report	Safe R	November 7, 2016
Sabato's Crystal Ball	Safe R	November 7, 2016
RealClearPolitics	Safe R	November 8, 2016
Fox News	Safe R	November 7, 2016

=== Results ===
Chart of popular vote
1. Trump (68.5%)
2. Clinton (26.4%)
3. Johnson (3.22%)
4. Write-ins (0.53%)
5. Stein (1.13%)

2016 United States presidential election in West Virginia
Party	Candidate	Running mate	Popular vote		Electoral vote		Swing
Party	Candidate	Running mate	Count	%	Count	%	Swing
Republican	Donald Trump of New York	Mike Pence of Indiana	489,371	68.50%	5	100.00%	▲6.30%
Democratic	Hillary Clinton of New York	Tim Kaine of Virginia	188,794	26.43%	0	0.00%	▼9.11%
Libertarian	Gary Johnson of New Mexico	Bill Weld of Massachusetts	23,004	3.22%	0	0.00%	▲2.28%
Mountain	Jill Stein of Massachusetts	Ajamu Baraka of Illinois	8,075	1.13%	0	0.00%	▲0.47%
Constitution	Darrell L. Castle of Tennessee	Scott N. Bradley of Utah	3,807	0.53%	0	0.00%	▲0.51%
Write-in	Various of Various	Various of Various	1,372	0.19%	0	0.00%	▼0.03%
Total			714,423	100.00%	5	100.00%	

==== By county ====
County	Donald Trump Republican		Hillary Clinton Democratic		Various candidates Other parties		Margin		Total
County	#	%	#	%	#	%	#	%	Total
Barbour	4,527	74.02%	1,222	19.98%	367	6.00%	3,305	54.04%	6,116
Berkeley	28,244	65.13%	12,321	28.41%	2,799	6.46%	15,923	36.72%	43,364
Boone	6,504	74.09%	1,790	20.39%	485	5.52%	4,714	53.70%	8,779
Braxton	3,537	69.35%	1,321	25.90%	242	4.75%	2,216	43.45%	5,100
Brooke	6,625	68.33%	2,568	26.49%	503	5.18%	4,057	41.84%	9,696
Cabell	19,850	59.09%	11,447	34.08%	2,294	6.83%	8,403	25.01%	33,591
Calhoun	2,035	77.14%	456	17.29%	147	5.57%	1,579	59.85%	2,638
Clay	2,300	76.79%	568	18.96%	127	4.25%	1,732	57.83%	2,995
Doddridge	2,358	82.36%	362	12.64%	143	5.00%	1,996	69.72%	2,863
Fayette	10,357	66.91%	4,290	27.72%	831	5.37%	6,067	39.19%	15,478
Gilmer	1,896	73.52%	545	21.13%	138	5.35%	1,351	52.39%	2,579
Grant	4,346	87.53%	512	10.31%	107	2.16%	3,834	77.22%	4,965
Greenbrier	9,556	67.18%	3,765	26.47%	903	6.35%	5,791	40.71%	14,224
Hampshire	6,692	77.11%	1,580	18.20%	407	4.69%	5,112	58.91%	8,679
Hancock	8,909	69.59%	3,262	25.48%	631	4.93%	5,647	44.11%	12,802
Hardy	4,274	75.33%	1,155	20.36%	245	4.31%	3,119	54.97%	5,674
Harrison	18,750	66.14%	7,694	27.14%	1,907	6.72%	11,056	39.00%	28,351
Jackson	9,020	73.31%	2,663	21.64%	621	5.05%	6,357	51.67%	12,304
Jefferson	13,204	53.88%	9,518	38.84%	1,786	7.28%	3,686	15.04%	24,508
Kanawha	43,850	57.03%	28,263	36.76%	4,775	6.21%	15,587	20.27%	76,888
Lewis	5,274	76.04%	1,347	19.42%	315	4.54%	3,927	56.62%	6,936
Lincoln	5,307	74.36%	1,459	20.44%	371	5.20%	3,848	53.92%	7,137
Logan	9,897	79.56%	2,092	16.82%	451	3.62%	7,805	62.74%	12,440
Marion	14,668	62.77%	6,964	29.80%	1,735	7.43%	7,704	32.97%	23,367
Marshall	9,666	72.39%	2,918	21.85%	769	5.76%	6,748	50.54%	13,353
Mason	7,654	74.54%	2,081	20.26%	534	5.20%	5,573	54.28%	10,269
McDowell	4,629	74.11%	1,438	23.02%	179	2.87%	3,191	51.09%	6,246
Mercer	17,404	75.03%	4,704	20.28%	1,089	4.69%	12,700	54.75%	23,197
Mineral	9,070	77.71%	2,050	17.56%	551	4.73%	7,020	60.15%	11,671
Mingo	7,911	83.17%	1,370	14.40%	231	2.43%	6,541	68.77%	9,512
Monongalia	18,432	50.13%	14,699	39.97%	3,641	9.90%	3,733	10.16%	36,772
Monroe	4,443	75.92%	1,111	18.98%	298	5.10%	3,332	56.94%	5,852
Morgan	5,732	74.09%	1,573	20.33%	432	5.58%	4,159	53.76%	7,737
Nicholas	7,251	75.70%	1,840	19.21%	488	5.09%	5,411	56.49%	9,579
Ohio	11,139	61.16%	5,493	30.16%	1,582	8.68%	5,646	31.00%	18,214
Pendleton	2,398	73.69%	729	22.40%	127	3.91%	1,669	51.29%	3,254
Pleasants	2,358	74.17%	621	19.53%	200	6.30%	1,737	54.64%	3,179
Pocahontas	2,496	67.92%	928	25.25%	251	6.83%	1,568	42.67%	3,675
Preston	9,538	74.73%	2,470	19.35%	756	5.92%	7,068	55.38%	12,764
Putnam	17,788	70.56%	5,884	23.34%	1,539	6.10%	11,904	47.22%	25,211
Raleigh	22,048	73.76%	6,443	21.55%	1,401	4.69%	15,605	52.21%	29,892
Randolph	7,629	69.55%	2,735	24.93%	605	5.52%	4,894	44.62%	10,969
Ritchie	3,405	82.95%	496	12.08%	204	4.97%	2,909	70.87%	4,105
Roane	3,781	71.12%	1,222	22.99%	313	5.89%	2,559	48.13%	5,316
Summers	3,455	70.61%	1,190	24.32%	248	5.07%	2,265	46.29%	4,893
Taylor	4,733	71.79%	1,491	22.61%	369	5.60%	3,242	49.18%	6,593
Tucker	2,565	73.26%	751	21.45%	185	5.29%	1,814	51.81%	3,501
Tyler	2,996	81.15%	507	13.73%	189	5.12%	2,489	67.42%	3,692
Upshur	7,005	75.34%	1,766	18.99%	527	5.67%	5,239	56.35%	9,298
Wayne	11,152	72.67%	3,357	21.87%	838	5.46%	7,795	50.80%	15,347
Webster	2,302	76.45%	556	18.47%	153	5.08%	1,746	57.98%	3,011
Wetzel	4,519	71.59%	1,359	21.53%	434	6.88%	3,160	50.06%	6,312
Wirt	1,911	78.90%	386	15.94%	125	5.16%	1,525	62.96%	2,422
Wood	25,434	70.51%	8,400	23.29%	2,237	6.20%	17,034	47.22%	36,071
Wyoming	6,547	83.08%	1,062	13.48%	271	3.44%	5,485	69.60%	7,880
Totals	489,371	67.85%	188,794	26.18%	43,096	5.97%	300,577	41.67%	721,261

==== By congressional district ====
Trump won all three congressional districts.

District	Trump	Clinton	Representative
1st	68%	26%	David McKinley
2nd	66%	29%	Alex Mooney
3rd	73%	23%	Evan Jenkins

== Analysis ==
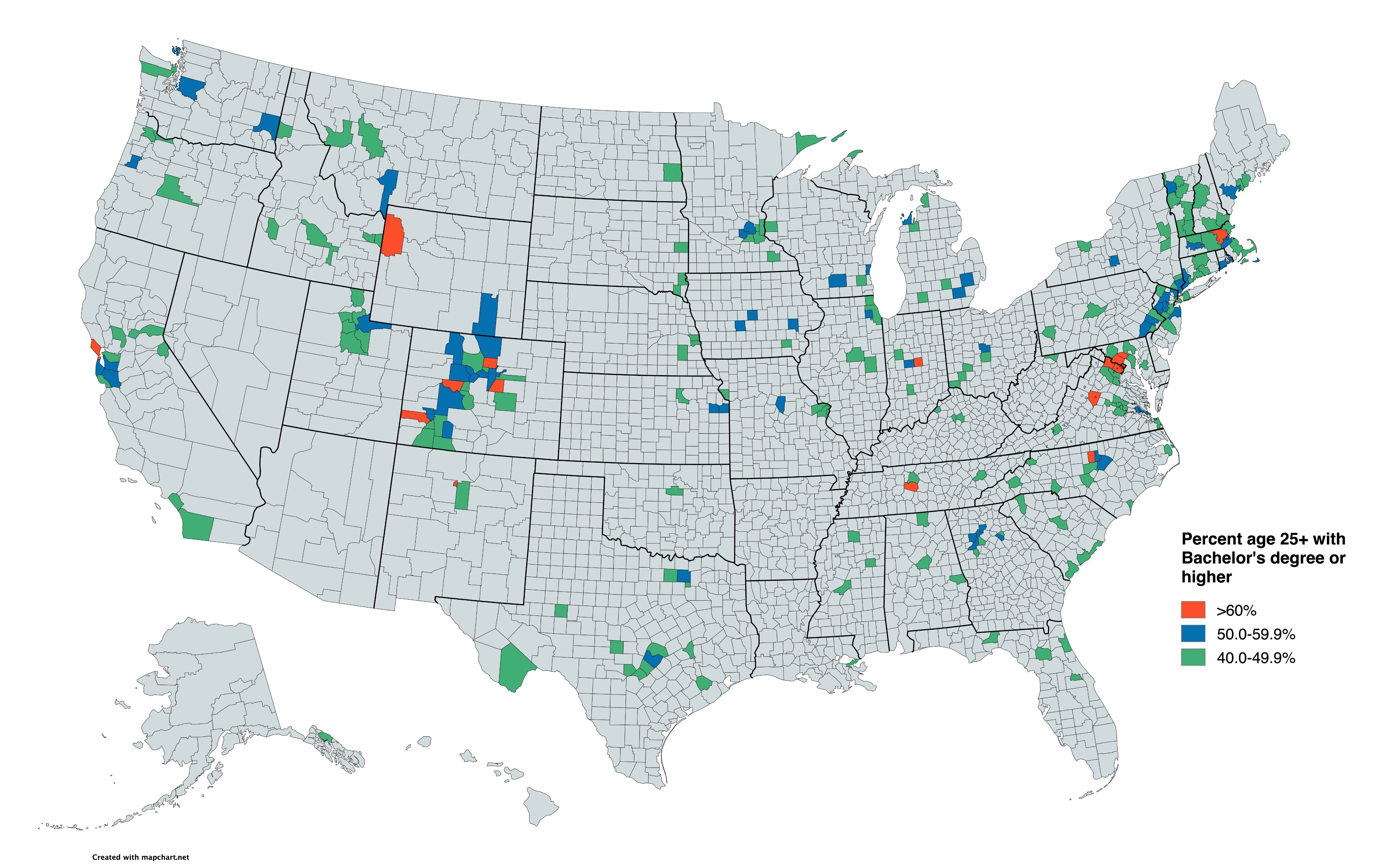
A map of the most college-educated counties in the United States

As expected, Republican nominee Donald Trump won West Virginia in a 42-point rout over Democratic nominee Hillary Clinton, thanks to ardent support from coal industry workers in Appalachia. He thus captured all five electoral votes from West Virginia. With a 15.41% swing to Trump, West Virginia had the second largest swing to Trump after North Dakota.

In addition to being his strongest state in the election and scoring what was at the time the best vote share for a presidential candidate in the state's history, West Virginia was one of two states where Trump won every county, the other being Oklahoma. This was the second consecutive presidential election where every county in the state voted Republican. Trump's 42.1% margin of victory is the largest of any presidential candidate from either party in the state's history, besting Abraham Lincoln's 36.4% margin of victory in 1864. He would be unable to best this record margin of victory in his subsequent presidential runs in 2020 and 2024 despite earning 68.62% and 69.97% of the vote, respectively, both of them greater vote shares than his 2016 performance.

Clinton's performance was the worst by a major party nominee since 1912, when three candidates split the vote and received over 20% of the vote each. As of 2024, it also remains the worst performance ever by a Democrat in West Virginia. Clinton won fewer votes in the general election than were cast in her party's primary overall, as well as fewer votes than she received in the 2008 state primary. Clinton also received the fewest votes for a Democrat in a West Virginia presidential election since 1916, exactly 100 years prior.

West Virginia is one of the least-educated states in the country, with only one county having at least 40% of its adult residents with a bachelor's degree. That county, Monongalia County (home to West Virginia University), had the smallest swing to Trump out of any county in the state. The rest of the state swung massively to Trump.

Trump had promised to bring back mining jobs in economically depressed areas of coal country, whereas his opponent had proposed investing millions into converting the region to a producer of green energy. Democrats' championing of environmentalism is viewed as a threat in coal country, and Clinton faced a towering rejection from Mountain State voters. Clinton was also seen as being "haunted" by a comment she made within the state itself, in which, while describing the transition to sustainable energy, she stated "We're going to put a lot of coal miners and coal companies out of business."

West Virginia was once a solidly Democratic state; it voted Democratic in every election from 1932 to 1996, except for the Republican landslides of 1956, 1972, and 1984. However, in recent years it has drifted to becoming solidly Republican and has stayed that way since it was won by George W. Bush in 2000. Barack Obama, for example, failed to win even a single county in 2012.

The change to increasing Republican control had also been reflected at the state level. While West Virginia was one of several states with a Democratic governor (Earl Ray Tomblin) in 2016 where Trump won, Republicans had won both chambers of the state legislature in the 2014 elections. In the ensuing years, more statewide executive offices also were won by Republican candidates.

== See also ==
- Democratic Party presidential debates, 2016
- Democratic Party presidential primaries, 2016
- Republican Party presidential debates, 2016
- Republican Party presidential primaries, 2016
