= 2020 United States presidential election in West Virginia =

- November 3, 2020
- Turnout: 63.25% ▲

Nominee	Donald Trump	Joe Biden
Party	Republican	Democratic
Home state	Florida	Delaware
Running mate	Mike Pence	Kamala Harris
Electoral vote	5	0
Popular vote	545,382	235,984
Percentage	68.62%	29.69%

Trump
40–50%
50–60%
60–70%
70–80%
80–90%
90–100%
Biden
40–50%
50–60%
60–70%
70–80%
80–90%
90–100%
President before election
Donald Trump
Republican
Elected President
Joe Biden
Democratic

The 2020 United States presidential election in West Virginia was held on Tuesday, November 3, 2020, as part of the 2020 United States presidential election in which all 50 states plus the District of Columbia participated. West Virginia voters chose electors to represent them in the Electoral College via a popular vote, pitting the Republican Party's nominee, incumbent President Donald Trump, and running mate Vice President Mike Pence against Democratic Party nominee, former Vice President Joe Biden, and his running mate California Senator Kamala Harris. West Virginia had five electoral votes in the Electoral College.

Trump easily carried West Virginia on Election Day by 38.9 points, although this marked a decrease from his 42.1-point victory in 2016, thereby making this the first time the state shifted to the left from the previous presidential election since 1996. Prior to the election, all 16 news organizations declared West Virginia a safe, or likely, red state. This was the first time ever that an incumbent Republican president carried the state while losing re–election.

With 68.62% of its vote, West Virginia would prove to be Trump's second-strongest state in 2020, only behind Wyoming. Overall, Trump earned the largest share of the vote won by any presidential candidate in the state until his subsequent performance in 2024, where he would win 69.97% of the vote. Since West Virginia became a Republican stronghold in recent elections, Biden is only the third Democrat ever to win the presidency without carrying the state, after Barack Obama and Woodrow Wilson.

== Primary elections ==
The primary elections were originally scheduled for May 12, 2020. In April, they were moved to June 9 due to concerns over the COVID-19 pandemic.

=== Democratic primary ===
Vice President Joe Biden won the Democratic primary and received all of West Virginia's 28 pledged delegates, as well as all six unpledged PLEO (party leaders and elected officials) delegates, to the 2020 Democratic National Convention.

2020 West Virginia Democratic presidential primary
Candidate	Votes	%	Delegates
Joe Biden	122,518	65.35	28
Bernie Sanders (withdrawn)	22,793	12.16	
David Lee Rice	15,470	8.25	
Elizabeth Warren (withdrawn)	5,741	3.06	
Tulsi Gabbard (withdrawn)	4,163	2.22	
Michael Bloomberg (withdrawn)	3,759	2.01	
Pete Buttigieg (withdrawn)	3,455	1.84	
Amy Klobuchar (withdrawn)	3,011	1.61	
Andrew Yang (withdrawn)	2,590	1.38	
Michael Bennet (withdrawn)	1,865	0.99	
Tom Steyer (withdrawn)	1,235	0.66	
Deval Patrick (withdrawn)	882	0.47	
Total	187,482	100%	28

=== Republican primary ===
Incumbent President Donald Trump won the Republican primary and received all of West Virginia's 35 delegates to the 2020 Republican National Convention.

2020 West Virginia Republican presidential primary
Candidate	Popular vote		Pledged delegates
Candidate	#	%	Pledged delegates
Donald Trump (incumbent)	198,691	94.39	35
Joe Walsh (withdrawn)	3,806	1.81	0
Bill Weld (withdrawn)	3,721	1.77	0
Rocky De La Fuente	1,537	0.73	0
Bob Ely	1,436	0.68	0
Matthew Mattern	1,315	0.62	0
Total	210,506	100%	35

=== Mountain (Green) primary ===
West Virginia's Green Party affiliate conducted an online party-run primary, utilizing the state's original primary date of May 12, 2020, as its deadline.

West Virginia Mountain (Green) Party presidential primary
Candidate	Percentage	National delegates
Howie Hawkins	78.3%	5
David Rolde	8.7%	0
Jesse Ventura (write-in)	8.7%	0
Dario Hunter	4.3%	0
Total	100.00%	5

== General election ==
=== Predictions ===
Source	Ranking	As of
The Cook Political Report	Safe R	September 10, 2020
Inside Elections	Safe R	September 4, 2020
Sabato's Crystal Ball	Safe R	July 14, 2020
Politico	Safe R	September 8, 2020
RCP	Safe R	August 3, 2020
Niskanen	Safe R	July 26, 2020
CNN	Safe R	August 3, 2020
The Economist	Safe R	September 2, 2020
CBS News	Likely R	August 16, 2020
270towin	Safe R	August 2, 2020
ABC News	Safe R	July 31, 2020
NPR	Likely R	August 3, 2020
NBC News	Safe R	August 6, 2020
538	Safe R	September 9, 2020

=== Polling ===
View source data.

Aggregate polls

Source of poll aggregation	Dates administered	Dates updated	Joe Biden Democratic	Donald Trump Republican	Other/ undecided (Note: Calculated by taking the difference of 100% and all other candidates combined.)	Margin
270 to Win	October 13–23, 2020	November 3, 2020	38.5%	55.5%	6.0%	Trump +17.0
FiveThirtyEight	until November 2, 2020	November 3, 2020	33.5%	62.1%	4.4%	Trump +28.6
Average			36.0%	58.8%	5.2%	Trump +22.8

Polls

Poll source	Date(s) administered	Sample size (Note: Key: A – all adults RV – registered voters LV – likely voters V – unclear)	Margin of error	Donald Trump Republican	Joe Biden Democratic	Jo Jorgensen Libertarian	Howie Hawkins Mountain	Other	Undecided
SurveyMonkey/Axios	Oct 20 – Nov 2, 2020	816 (LV)	± 5%	67% (Note: Overlapping sample with the previous SurveyMonkey/Axios poll, but more information available regarding sample size)	32%	–	–	–	–
SurveyMonkey/Axios	Oct 1–28, 2020	1,359 (LV)	–	66%	32%	–	–	–	–
Triton Polling and Research/WMOV	Oct 19–21, 2020	544 (LV)	± 4.2%	58%	38%	–	–	–	4%
Research America Inc./West Virginia Metro News	Oct 6–9, 2020	450 (LV)	± 4.6%	53%	39%	4%	1%	–	3%
Triton Polling & Research/WMOV	Sep 29–30, 2020 (Note: Additional data sourced from FiveThirtyEight)	525 (RV)	± 4.3%	56%	38%	–	–	–	5%
SurveyMonkey/Axios	Sep 1–30, 2020	516 (LV)	–	62%	36%	–	–	–	2%
SurveyMonkey/Axios	Aug 1–31, 2020	496 (LV)	–	65%	32%	–	–	–	2%
SurveyMonkey/Axios	Jul 1–31, 2020	494 (LV)	–	67%	32%	–	–	–	1%
SurveyMonkey/Axios	Jun 8–30, 2020	264 (LV)	–	72%	27%	–	–	–	1%
WPA Intelligence/Club for Growth (Note: The Club for Growth is a PAC supporting the Donald Trump 2020 presidential campaign.)	Jan 7–9, 2020	500 (LV)	± 4.4%	66%	31%	–	–	–	3%

Former candidates

Donald Trump vs. Bernie Sanders

Poll source	Date(s) administered	Sample size	Margin of error	Donald Trump (R)	Bernie Sanders (D)	Undecided
WPA Intelligence/Club for Growth	Jan 7–9, 2020	500 (LV)	± 4.4 %	66%	29%	5%
Tulchin Research	Oct 6–13, 2017	400 (LV)	± 4.9%	46%	48%	6%

Donald Trump vs. Elizabeth Warren

Poll source	Date(s) administered	Sample size	Margin of error	Donald Trump (R)	Elizabeth Warren (D)	Undecided
Zogby Analytics	Aug 17–23, 2017	401 (LV)	± 4.9%	43%	40%	17%

=== Results ===
State Senate district results

Trump won West Virginia, carrying the popular vote in each of the state's 55 counties.

2020 United States presidential election in West Virginia
Party	Candidate	Votes	%	±%
Republican	Donald Trump Mike Pence	545,382	68.62	+0.10%
Democratic	Joe Biden Kamala Harris	235,984	29.69	+3.27%
Libertarian	Jo Jorgensen Spike Cohen	10,687	1.34	−1.88%
Mountain	Howie Hawkins Angela Walker	2,599	0.33	−0.80%
Socialism and Liberation	Gloria La Riva Sunil Freeman (write-in)	9	0.00	N/A
Write-in		70	0.01	−0.18%
Total votes		794,731	100.00	N/A

==== By congressional district ====
Trump won all three congressional districts.

District	Trump	Biden	Representative
1st	68%	30%	David McKinley
2nd	65%	33%	Alex Mooney
3rd	73%	25%	Carol Miller

==== By county ====
County	Donald Trump Republican		Joe Biden Democratic		Various candidates Other parties		Margin		Total
County	#	%	#	%	#	%	#	%	Total
Barbour	5,116	76.62%	1,457	21.82%	104	1.56%	3,659	54.80%	6,677
Berkeley	33,279	64.57%	17,186	33.35%	1,074	2.08%	16,093	31.22%	51,539
Boone	6,816	75.62%	2,041	22.65%	156	1.73%	4,775	52.97%	9,013
Braxton	4,120	72.74%	1,457	25.72%	87	1.54%	2,663	47.02%	5,664
Brooke	7,545	70.81%	2,947	27.66%	164	1.53%	4,598	43.15%	10,656
Cabell	21,721	58.14%	14,994	40.13%	645	1.73%	6,727	18.01%	37,360
Calhoun	2,364	79.57%	568	19.12%	39	1.31%	1,796	60.45%	2,971
Clay	2,679	79.61%	641	19.05%	45	1.34%	2,038	60.56%	3,365
Doddridge	2,619	84.46%	435	14.03%	47	1.51%	2,184	70.43%	3,101
Fayette	11,580	68.64%	5,063	30.01%	227	1.35%	6,517	38.63%	16,870
Gilmer	2,012	75.58%	599	22.50%	51	1.92%	1,413	53.08%	2,662
Grant	4,871	88.40%	607	11.02%	32	0.58%	4,264	77.38%	5,510
Greenbrier	10,925	68.93%	4,655	29.37%	270	1.70%	6,270	39.56%	15,850
Hampshire	8,033	79.65%	1,939	19.22%	114	1.13%	6,094	60.43%	10,086
Hancock	9,806	71.05%	3,790	27.46%	206	1.49%	6,016	43.59%	13,802
Hardy	4,859	76.73%	1,381	21.81%	93	1.46%	3,478	54.92%	6,333
Harrison	20,683	67.89%	9,215	30.25%	567	1.86%	11,468	37.64%	30,465
Jackson	10,093	74.71%	3,207	23.74%	209	1.55%	6,886	50.97%	13,509
Jefferson	15,033	54.26%	12,127	43.77%	545	1.97%	2,906	10.49%	27,705
Kanawha	46,398	56.41%	34,344	41.76%	1,508	1.83%	12,054	14.65%	82,250
Lewis	5,782	77.52%	1,538	20.62%	139	1.86%	4,244	56.90%	7,459
Lincoln	6,012	76.77%	1,711	21.85%	108	1.38%	4,301	54.92%	7,831
Logan	10,534	80.87%	2,333	17.91%	159	1.22%	8,201	62.96%	13,026
Marion	16,300	63.18%	8,901	34.50%	598	2.32%	7,399	28.68%	25,799
Marshall	10,435	74.11%	3,455	24.54%	190	1.35%	6,980	49.57%	14,080
Mason	8,491	75.77%	2,526	22.54%	189	1.69%	5,965	53.23%	11,206
McDowell	5,148	78.87%	1,333	20.42%	46	0.71%	3,815	58.45%	6,527
Mercer	19,237	76.53%	5,556	22.10%	342	1.37%	13,681	54.43%	25,135
Mineral	10,040	77.97%	2,660	20.66%	176	1.37%	7,380	57.31%	12,876
Mingo	8,544	85.22%	1,397	13.93%	85	0.85%	7,147	71.29%	10,026
Monongalia	20,803	49.44%	20,282	48.20%	994	2.36%	521	1.24%	42,079
Monroe	5,068	78.09%	1,345	20.72%	77	1.19%	3,723	57.37%	6,490
Morgan	6,537	75.17%	1,998	22.98%	161	1.85%	4,539	52.19%	8,696
Nicholas	8,279	77.86%	2,226	20.93%	128	1.21%	6,053	56.93%	10,633
Ohio	12,354	62.08%	7,223	36.30%	323	1.62%	5,131	25.78%	19,900
Pendleton	2,782	76.03%	820	22.41%	57	1.56%	1,962	53.62%	3,659
Pleasants	2,742	78.54%	699	20.02%	50	1.44%	2,043	58.52%	3,491
Pocahontas	2,895	72.21%	1,047	26.12%	67	1.57%	1,848	46.09%	4,009
Preston	11,190	76.79%	3,163	21.70%	220	1.51%	8,027	55.09%	14,573
Putnam	20,034	70.29%	7,878	27.64%	589	2.07%	12,156	42.65%	28,501
Raleigh	24,673	74.51%	7,982	24.10%	459	1.39%	16,691	50.41%	33,114
Randolph	8,673	71.09%	3,362	27.56%	165	1.35%	5,311	43.53%	12,200
Ritchie	3,649	85.20%	586	13.68%	48	1.12%	3,063	71.52%	4,283
Roane	4,213	73.10%	1,455	25.25%	95	1.65%	2,758	47.85%	5,763
Summers	4,074	72.95%	1,448	25.93%	63	1.12%	2,626	47.02%	5,585
Taylor	5,477	74.18%	1,796	24.33%	110	1.49%	3,681	49.85%	7,383
Tucker	2,841	73.89%	938	24.40%	66	1.71%	1,903	49.49%	3,845
Tyler	3,226	82.23%	631	16.08%	66	1.69%	2,595	66.15%	3,923
Upshur	7,771	76.01%	2,256	22.07%	196	1.92%	5,515	53.94%	10,223
Wayne	12,585	74.26%	4,088	24.12%	274	1.62%	8,497	50.14%	16,947
Webster	2,759	81.10%	610	17.93%	33	0.97%	2,149	63.17%	3,402
Wetzel	4,993	74.87%	1,539	23.08%	137	2.05%	3,454	51.79%	6,669
Wirt	2,134	80.44%	466	17.57%	53	1.99%	1,668	62.87%	2,653
Wood	27,202	70.17%	10,926	28.19%	637	1.64%	16,276	41.98%	38,765
Wyoming	7,353	85.58%	1,157	13.47%	82	0.95%	6,196	72.11%	8,592
Totals	545,382	68.62%	235,984	29.69%	13,365	1.69%	309,398	38.93%	794,731

== Analysis ==
West Virginia, which was solidly Democratic territory for much of the 20th century, has consistently voted Republican in presidential elections since 2000. Republicans started making gains in the state in the 21st century due to championing of environmentalism by Democrats such as 2000 Democratic nominee Al Gore, which challenged entrenched coal-mining interests.

West Virginia gave Trump his second-highest vote share in 2020, swapping places with Wyoming, after having been Trump's strongest state by vote share in 2016. This is the best Republican performance in state history, surpassing the record set in the previous election. West Virginia was one of two states where Trump won every county, the other being Oklahoma. The closest county in the state, and the only one Trump won without a majority of the vote, was Monongalia County, home to Morgantown and the main campus of West Virginia University. Biden's losing margin of 1.24% in Monongalia marked the closest a Democrat has come to winning any county in West Virginia since 2008. This was the third consecutive presidential election where every county within the state voted Republican, but the first since 1996 in which the Democratic vote share increased relative to the preceding election. Biden received over 40% of the vote in only 4 counties - Monongalia; Kanawha County, home to the state capital and largest city Charleston; Cabell County, home to Marshall University and to the state's second largest city Huntington; and Jefferson County, home to Washington, D.C., exurbs.

Per exit polls by the Associated Press, Trump's strength in West Virginia came from voters who prioritized protecting and expanding production of fossil fuels, such as coal, who comprised 58% of voters and broke for Trump by 90%. Trump's strongest region was southern West Virginia. This coal-mining, union-heavy region was once among the most heavily Democratic places in the nation; Logan County, for example, broke 72% of its ballots for Bill Clinton in 1996, 61% for Al Gore in 2000, 52% for John Kerry in 2004, and even 51% for George McGovern in his only statewide county win in 1972; but by 2008, John McCain flipped it to the Republican column with 54% of the vote, which increased to 68% for Mitt Romney in 2012 and by 2016 and 2020, it had voted 79.6% and 80.9% for Trump, respectively.

During the same election cycle, incumbent Republican Senator Shelley Moore Capito was re-elected by a margin slightly larger than Trump's, beating out Democrat Paula Jean Swearengin by 43.3 points.

== Notes ==
Partisan clients

== See also ==
- United States presidential elections in West Virginia
- 2020 United States presidential election
- 2020 Democratic Party presidential primaries
- 2020 Green Party presidential primaries
- 2020 Libertarian Party presidential primaries
- 2020 Republican Party presidential primaries
- 2020 United States elections
- 2020 United States Senate election in West Virginia
- 2020 United States House of Representatives elections in West Virginia
