= Knob Fork =

Knob Fork may refer to:

- Knob Fork, West Virginia, an unincorporated community
- Knob Fork (West Virginia), a stream in West Virginia
