= Carbide, Wetzel County, West Virginia =

Unincorporated community in West Virginia, United States

Carbide
- Unincorporated community
- Location within the state of West Virginia Carbide (the United States)
- Coordinates: 39°32′22″N 80°40′0″W
- Country: United States
- State: West Virginia
- County: Wetzel
- Elevation: 732 ft (223 m)
- Time zone: UTC-5 (Eastern (EST))
  - Summer (DST): UTC-4 (EDT)
- GNIS ID: 1554069

Carbide is an unincorporated community in Wetzel County, West Virginia, United States.
