= Mobley, West Virginia =

Mobley
- Unincorporated community
- Location within the state of West Virginia Mobley (the United States)
- Coordinates: 39°33′25″N 80°32′55″W
- Country: United States
- State: West Virginia
- County: Wetzel
- Elevation: 886 ft (270 m)
- Time zone: UTC-5 (Eastern (EST))
  - Summer (DST): UTC-4 (EDT)
- GNIS ID: 1549829

Mobley is an unincorporated community in Wetzel County, West Virginia, United States.
