= Kodol, West Virginia =

Kodol
- Unincorporated community
- Location within the state of West Virginia Kodol (the United States)
- Coordinates: 39°37′22″N 80°32′26″W
- Country: United States
- State: West Virginia
- County: Wetzel
- Elevation: 1,148 ft (350 m)
- Time zone: UTC-5 (Eastern (EST))
  - Summer (DST): UTC-4 (EDT)
- GNIS ID: 1554894

Kodol is an unincorporated community in Wetzel County, West Virginia, United States.

The community was named after a type of medicine, namely Kodol Dyspepsia Cure.
