= Harker Run =

Stream in West Virginia, US

Coordinates: 39°37′12″N 80°28′07″W

Location
- Country: United States

Physical characteristics
- Source
  - location: Wetzel County, West Virginia, US
  - elevation: 430 m (1,410 ft)
- Mouth
  - location: Long Drain, West Virginia, US
- Length: 2.8 km (1.7 mi)

Harker Run is a stream located in Wetzel County, West Virginia, United States. The mouth of Harker Run is approximately 300 m (1000 ft) south-southwest of the small village of Earnshaw. The creek flows roughly from southwest to northeast, and is approximately 2.8 km (1.7 mi) in total length. It drains into Long Drain at its northeastern end at 330 m (1080 ft) above sea level. At its highest point, the creek is at approximately 430 m (1400 ft) elevation. The entire length of the stream is paralleled by Harker Run Road.

== See also ==
- List of rivers of West Virginia
