= Fanlight, West Virginia =

Unincorporated community in West Virginia, United States

Fanlight
- Unincorporated community
- Location within the state of West Virginia Fanlight (the United States)
- Coordinates: 39°42′42″N 80°36′19″W
- Country: United States
- State: West Virginia
- County: Wetzel
- Elevation: 1,286 ft (392 m)
- Time zone: UTC-5 (Eastern (EST))
  - Summer (DST): UTC-4 (EDT)
- GNIS ID: 1717676

Fanlight was an unincorporated community in Wetzel County, West Virginia, United States. Its post office no longer exists.
