= Rockport, West Virginia =

Rockport, West Virginia may refer to:

- Rockport, Wetzel County, West Virginia
- Rockport, Wood County, West Virginia
