= Reader, West Virginia =

Reader
- Census-designated place (CDP)
- Location within the state of West Virginia
- Coordinates: 39°34′8″N 80°43′58″W
- Country: United States
- State: West Virginia
- County: Wetzel

Area
  - Total: 0.946 sq mi (2.45 km^{2})
  - Land: 0.929 sq mi (2.41 km^{2})
  - Water: 0.017 sq mi (0.044 km^{2})

Population (2020)
  - Total: 278
  - Density: 299/sq mi (116/km^{2})
- Time zone: UTC-5 (Eastern (EST))
  - Summer (DST): UTC-4 (EDT)

Reader is a census-designated place (CDP) in Wetzel County, West Virginia, United States. As of the 2020 census, its population was 278 (down from 397 at the 2010 census).

Reader got its start circa 1901 when the railroad was extended to that point. The community took its name from nearby Reader Run creek.
