= Coburn, West Virginia =

Unincorporated community in West Virginia, United States

Coburn
- Unincorporated community
- Location within the state of West Virginia Coburn (the United States)
- Coordinates: 39°35′34″N 80°30′12″W
- Country: United States
- State: West Virginia
- County: Wetzel
- Time zone: UTC-5 (Eastern (EST))
  - Summer (DST): UTC-4 (EDT)

Coburn is an unincorporated community in Wetzel County, West Virginia, United States. It lies at an elevation of 978 feet (298 m).

Coburn bears the name of an early settler.
