= Folsom, West Virginia =

Unincorporated community in West Virginia, United States

Folsom
- Unincorporated community
- Nickname: Robinson
- Location within the state of West Virginia Folsom (the United States)
- Coordinates: 39°28′14″N 80°31′13″W
- Country: United States
- State: West Virginia
- County: Wetzel
- Time zone: UTC-5 (Eastern (EST))
  - Summer (DST): UTC-4 (EDT)
- ZIP code: 26348

Folsom is an unincorporated community in Wetzel County, West Virginia, United States. It lies at an elevation of 925 feet (282 m).

Folsom used to be called Robinson, named after the Robinson Improvement Company, and was later changed to Folsom, after Francis Folsom, the maiden name of Grover Cleveland's wife.

Chinese worked alongside West Virginians on the construction of the railroad in Folsom and through the rest of the Shortline area. Folsom Grade School was consolidated into Smithfield School which was later consolidated into Reader's Shortline School. There also used to be a sawmill in Folsom, but when Route 20 came through, this mill and also a few houses were displaced.
