= 2000 United States presidential election in West Virginia =

- November 7, 2000
- Turnout: 61.94%

Nominee	George W. Bush	Al Gore
Party	Republican	Democratic
Home state	Texas	Tennessee
Running mate	Dick Cheney	Joe Lieberman
Electoral vote	5	0
Popular vote	336,475	295,497
Percentage	51.92%	45.59%

Bush
40–50%
50–60%
60–70%
70–80%
Gore
40–50%
50–60%
60–70%
President before election
Bill Clinton
Democratic
Elected President
George W. Bush
Republican

The 2000 United States presidential election in West Virginia took place on November 7, 2000, as part of the 2000 United States presidential election. Voters chose 5 representatives, or electors to the Electoral College, who voted for president and vice president.

West Virginia gave its 5 electoral votes to the Republican nominee, Texas Governor George W. Bush, marking the first time a Republican carried the state since Ronald Reagan in 1984, and only the fourth time since 1928. While West Virginia was traditionally a Democratic stronghold, this election marked the beginning of a political realignment of the two Virginias.

From 1932 to 1996, West Virginia only voted Republican in their landslide victories in 1956, 1972, and 1984. Conversely, Virginia always voted Republican from 1968 to 2004, never voting even for Democrats who won the presidency.

But starting in 2000, West Virginia has always voted Republican, nearly always by increasing margins. Meanwhile, Virginia has nearly always trended more Democratic relative to the nation in every subsequent election.

This was the first time West Virginia voted for a Republican in a close election. In this election, West Virginia voted 6.84% more Republican than the nation at-large. In 2008, West Virginia voted for a Republican who lost the presidential election. Since 2012, the Republican nominee has won every county in the state. Since 2016, West Virginia has been the most or second-most Republican state in the nation.

As of the 2024 presidential election, this is the last election in which the Democratic candidate won Kanawha County, Harrison County, Lincoln County, and Wyoming County. This was the first time since 1928 that a non-incumbent Republican won West Virginia. This is also the last presidential election in which a Democrat won any congressional district in the state, the last time the state was won by single digits, the last time West Virginia voted to the left of Virginia, and the last time a Democrat won at least 45% of the vote in the state.

== General election ==
=== Predictions ===
Source	Rating	As of
The Cook Political Report	Toss Up	November 1, 2000

=== Polling ===
Poll source	Date(s)	Sample size	Margin of error	George W. Bush (R)	Al Gore (D)	Ralph Nader (G)	Other / undecided (Note: Calculated by taking the difference of 100% and all other listed candidates combined. For polls that do not report a figure for Nader, this includes his support.)
Harris Insights & Analytics	November 3, 2000	1,689	—	50%	46%	3%	1%
Rasmussen Reports	November 2, 2000	1,066	—	45%	42%	—	13%
West Virginia Research Center	October 25, 2000	536	—	41%	39%	1%	19%
RMS Research	October 22, 2000	605	—	46%	36%	—	18%
Ohio State University	October 18, 2000	645 (RV)	—	49%	39%	3%	9%
Rasmussen Reports	October 18, 2000	1,036	—	44%	42%	—	14%

=== Results ===
2000 United States presidential election in West Virginia
Party	Candidate	Running mate	Popular vote		Electoral vote		Swing
Party	Candidate	Running mate	Count	%	Count	%	Swing
Republican	George W. Bush of Texas	Dick Cheney of Wyoming	336,475	51.92%	5	100.00%	▲15.16%
Democratic	Al Gore of Tennessee	Joe Lieberman of Connecticut	295,497	45.59%	0	0.00%	▼5.92%
Green	Ralph Nader of Connecticut	Winona LaDuke of Minnesota	10,680	1.65%	0	0.00%	▲1.65%
Reform	Pat Buchanan of Virginia	Ezola B. Foster of California	3,169	0.49%	0	0.00%	▼10.77%
Libertarian	Harry Browne of Tennessee	Art Olivier of California	1,912	0.30%	0	0.00%	▼0.18%
Constitution	Howard Phillips of Virginia	Darrell Castle of Tennessee	23	0.00%	0	0.00%	Steady
Natural Law	John Hagelin of Iowa	Nat Goldhaber of California	367	0.06%	0	0.00%	▲0.06%
Write-in	Various of Various	Various of Various	1	0.00%	0	0.00%	Steady
Total			648,124	100.00%	5	100.00%	

==== By county ====
County	George W. Bush Republican		Al Gore Democratic		Various candidates Other parties		Margin		Total
County	#	%	#	%	#	%	#	%	Total
Barbour	3,411	56.37%	2,503	41.37%	137	2.26%	908	15.00%	6,051
Berkeley	13,619	59.19%	8,797	38.23%	594	2.58%	4,822	20.96%	23,010
Boone	3,353	36.68%	5,656	61.88%	132	1.44%	-2,303	-25.20%	9,141
Braxton	2,529	47.47%	2,719	51.03%	80	1.50%	-190	-3.56%	5,328
Brooke	4,195	44.60%	4,678	49.74%	532	5.66%	-483	-5.14%	9,405
Cabell	16,440	51.03%	14,896	46.24%	880	2.73%	1,544	4.79%	32,216
Calhoun	1,425	54.49%	1,112	42.52%	78	2.98%	313	11.97%	2,615
Clay	1,887	52.68%	1,617	45.14%	78	2.18%	270	7.54%	3,582
Doddridge	1,955	69.42%	773	27.45%	88	3.13%	1,182	41.97%	2,816
Fayette	5,897	40.34%	8,371	57.26%	351	2.40%	-2,474	-16.92%	14,619
Gilmer	1,560	56.93%	1,092	39.85%	88	3.21%	468	17.08%	2,740
Grant	3,571	78.76%	891	19.65%	72	1.59%	2,680	59.11%	4,534
Greenbrier	6,866	53.61%	5,627	43.93%	315	2.46%	1,239	9.68%	12,808
Hampshire	3,879	63.62%	2,069	33.93%	149	2.44%	1,810	29.69%	6,097
Hancock	6,458	47.94%	6,249	46.39%	765	5.68%	209	1.55%	13,472
Hardy	2,816	62.38%	1,621	35.91%	77	1.71%	1,195	26.47%	4,514
Harrison	12,948	48.72%	13,009	48.95%	621	2.34%	-61	-0.23%	26,578
Jackson	6,341	55.05%	4,937	42.86%	240	2.08%	1,404	12.19%	11,518
Jefferson	7,045	49.00%	6,860	47.71%	473	3.29%	185	1.29%	14,378
Kanawha	36,809	48.01%	38,524	50.25%	1,337	1.74%	-1,715	-2.24%	76,670
Lewis	3,606	58.79%	2,355	38.39%	173	2.82%	1,251	20.40%	6,134
Lincoln	3,389	45.40%	3,939	52.77%	136	1.82%	-550	-7.37%	7,464
Logan	5,334	36.94%	8,927	61.83%	178	1.23%	-3,593	-24.89%	14,439
Marion	9,972	43.60%	12,315	53.84%	586	2.56%	-2,343	-10.24%	22,873
Marshall	6,859	50.81%	6,000	44.45%	639	4.73%	859	6.36%	13,498
Mason	5,972	53.21%	4,963	44.22%	288	2.57%	1,009	8.99%	11,223
McDowell	2,348	32.15%	4,845	66.34%	110	1.51%	-2,497	-34.19%	7,303
Mercer	10,206	54.07%	8,347	44.22%	322	1.71%	1,859	9.85%	18,875
Mineral	6,180	63.18%	3,341	34.15%	261	2.67%	2,839	29.03%	9,782
Mingo	3,866	38.49%	6,049	60.23%	128	1.27%	-2,183	-21.74%	10,043
Monongalia	13,595	49.68%	12,603	46.05%	1,169	4.27%	992	3.63%	27,367
Monroe	2,940	57.21%	2,094	40.75%	105	2.04%	846	16.46%	5,139
Morgan	3,639	63.05%	1,939	33.59%	194	3.36%	1,700	29.46%	5,772
Nicholas	4,359	50.81%	4,059	47.31%	161	1.88%	300	3.50%	8,579
Ohio	9,607	53.48%	7,653	42.60%	704	3.92%	1,954	10.88%	17,964
Pendleton	1,996	61.97%	1,172	36.39%	53	1.65%	824	25.58%	3,221
Pleasants	1,884	58.73%	1,267	39.50%	57	1.78%	617	19.23%	3,208
Pocahontas	1,970	56.82%	1,392	40.15%	105	3.03%	578	16.67%	3,467
Preston	6,607	63.29%	3,515	33.67%	317	3.04%	3,092	29.62%	10,439
Putnam	12,173	59.60%	7,891	38.63%	362	1.77%	4,282	20.97%	20,426
Raleigh	12,587	52.31%	11,047	45.91%	427	1.77%	1,540	6.40%	24,061
Randolph	5,248	55.00%	4,028	42.21%	266	2.79%	1,220	12.79%	9,542
Ritchie	2,717	71.27%	1,024	26.86%	71	1.86%	1,693	44.41%	3,812
Roane	3,172	56.39%	2,332	41.46%	121	2.15%	840	14.93%	5,625
Summers	2,304	48.89%	2,299	48.78%	110	2.33%	5	0.11%	4,713
Taylor	3,124	54.69%	2,473	43.29%	115	2.01%	651	11.40%	5,712
Tucker	1,935	57.83%	1,319	39.42%	92	2.75%	616	18.41%	3,346
Tyler	2,582	65.73%	1,214	30.91%	132	3.36%	1,368	34.82%	3,928
Upshur	5,165	63.58%	2,770	34.10%	188	2.31%	2,395	29.48%	8,123
Wayne	7,993	49.21%	7,940	48.89%	308	1.90%	53	0.32%	16,241
Webster	1,484	44.86%	1,764	53.33%	60	1.81%	-280	-8.47%	3,308
Wetzel	3,239	51.51%	2,849	45.31%	200	3.18%	390	6.20%	6,288
Wirt	1,518	63.73%	818	34.34%	46	1.93%	700	29.39%	2,382
Wood	20,428	60.34%	12,664	37.40%	765	2.26%	7,764	22.94%	33,857
Wyoming	3,473	44.08%	4,289	54.44%	116	1.47%	-816	-10.36%	7,878
Totals	336,475	51.92%	295,497	45.59%	16,152	2.49%	40,978	6.33%	648,124

===== Counties that flipped from Democratic to Republican =====
- Barbour (Largest city: Philippi)
- Cabell (Largest city: Huntington)
- Calhoun (Largest city: Grantsville)
- Clay (Largest city: Clay)
- Gilmer (Largest city: Glenville)
- Greenbrier (Largest city: Lewisburg)
- Hancock (Largest city: Weirton)
- Hardy (Largest city: Moorefield)
- Jackson (Largest city: Ravenswood)
- Jefferson (Largest city: Charles Town)
- Lewis (Largest city: Weston)
- Marshall (Largest city: Moundsville)
- Mason (Largest city: Point Pleasant)
- Mercer (Largest city: Bluefield)
- Monongalia (Largest city: Morgantown)
- Monroe (Largest city: Peterstown)
- Nicholas (Largest city: Summersville)
- Ohio (Largest city: Wheeling)
- Pendleton (Largest city: Franklin)
- Pleasants (Largest city: St. Marys)
- Pocahontas (Largest city: Marlinton)
- Raleigh (Largest city: Beckley)
- Randolph (Largest city: Elkins)
- Roane (Largest city: Spencer)
- Summers (Largest city: Hinton)
- Taylor (Largest city: Grafton)
- Tucker (Largest city: Parsons)
- Tyler (Largest city: Paden City)
- Wayne (Largest city: Kenova)
- Wetzel (Largest city: New Martinsville)

==== By congressional district ====
Bush won two of three congressional districts, including one that elected a Democrat.

District	Gore	Bush	Representative
1st	43%	54%	Alan Mollohan
2nd	44%	54%	Bob Wise
2nd	44%	54%	Shelley Moore Capito
3rd	51%	47%	Nick Rahall

== Analysis ==
West Virginia is the only state that voted twice against George H. W. Bush and vote twice for George W. Bush. It is also the only state lost by George H. W. Bush in 1988 to be carried by George W. Bush in 2000.

West Virginia was also one of nine states Gore lost in 2000 that Bill Clinton won in both 1992 and 1996.
