= Wileyville, West Virginia =

Wileyville
- Unincorporated community
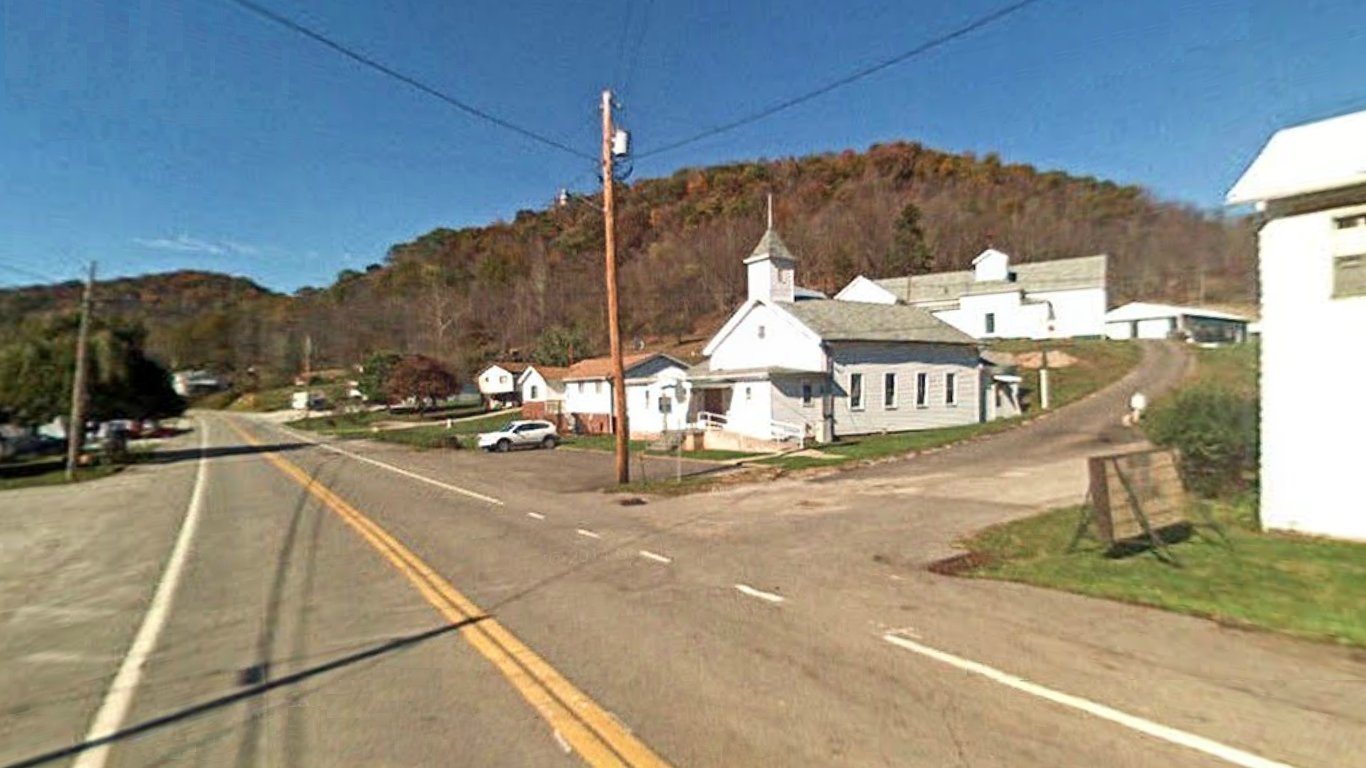

- Location within the state of West Virginia Wileyville (the United States)
- Coordinates: 39°37′50″N 80°40′24″W
- Country: United States
- State: West Virginia
- County: Wetzel
- Time zone: UTC-5 (Eastern (EST))
  - Summer (DST): UTC-4 (EDT)
- ZIP codes: 26581

Wileyville is an unincorporated community in Wetzel County, West Virginia, United States. It lies at an elevation of 804 feet (245 m). Wileyville once had a post office with ZIP code 26186, which closed on March 10, 2007. The post office is now located within Littleton and for mailing purposes both Wileyville and Littleton have a ZIP code of 26581.
