= Big Run, Wetzel County, West Virginia =

Unincorporated community in West Virginia, United States

Big Run
- Unincorporated community
- Location within the state of West Virginia Big Run (the United States)
- Coordinates: 39°35′4″N 80°34′39″W
- Country: United States
- State: West Virginia
- County: Wetzel
- Time zone: UTC-5 (Eastern (EST))
  - Summer (DST): UTC-4 (EDT)
- ZIP codes: 25651
- GNIS feature ID: 1549594

Big Run is an unincorporated community in Wetzel County, West Virginia, United States. It is named for Big Run, on which it is located.
