= Porters Falls, West Virginia =

Porters Falls
- Unincorporated community
- Location within the state of West Virginia Porters Falls (the United States)
- Coordinates: 39°34′47″N 80°46′34″W
- Country: United States
- State: West Virginia
- County: Wetzel
- Time zone: UTC-5 (Eastern (EST))
  - Summer (DST): UTC-4 (EDT)
- ZIP codes: 26162

Porters Falls (also Little Morgantown, Morgantown, or Porter's Falls) is an unincorporated community in Wetzel County, West Virginia, United States. It lies at an elevation of 682 feet (208 m).

The first settlement at Porters Falls was made in 1818.
