= Knob Fork, West Virginia =

Knob Fork
- Unincorporated community
- Location within the state of West Virginia Knob Fork (the United States)
- Coordinates: 39°38′55″N 80°32′48″W
- Country: United States
- State: West Virginia
- County: Wetzel
- Time zone: UTC-5 (Eastern (EST))
  - Summer (DST): UTC-4 (EDT)

Knob Fork is an unincorporated community in Wetzel County, West Virginia, United States. It lies at an elevation of 1050 feet (320 m). Other names for the community include Geaneytown, Jolliff, Jolliffe, Jolliffes Store, Knobfork Store, Sugar Run, and Uniontown. The present name is after nearby Knob Fork creek.
