= Smithfield, West Virginia =

- Town
- Location of Smithfield in Wetzel County, West Virginia.
- Coordinates: 39°29′49″N 80°33′40″W
- Country: United States
- State: West Virginia
- County: Wetzel
- Incorporated: 1904

Area
  - Total: 0.30 sq mi (0.77 km^{2})
  - Land: 0.29 sq mi (0.76 km^{2})
  - Water: 0.0039 sq mi (0.01 km^{2})
- Elevation: 846 ft (258 m)

Population (2020)
  - Total: 103
  - Estimate (2021): 101
  - Density: 499.6/sq mi (192.88/km^{2})
- Time zone: UTC-5 (Eastern (EST))
  - Summer (DST): UTC-4 (EDT)
- ZIP code: 26437
- Area code: 304
- FIPS code: 54-74788
- GNIS feature ID: 1555648

Smithfield is a town in Wetzel County, West Virginia, United States. The population was 103 at the 2020 census.

Smithfield was named for Henry Smith, who kept a store there.

== Geography ==
Smithfield is located at 39°29′49″N 80°33′40″W (39.496806, -80.561242).

According to the United States Census Bureau, the town has a total area of 0.30 square miles (0.78 km^{2}), of which 0.29 square miles (0.75 km^{2}) is land and 0.01 square miles (0.03 km^{2}) is water.

=== Climate ===
The climate in this area is characterized by hot, humid summers and generally mild to cool winters. According to the Köppen Climate Classification system, Smithfield has a humid subtropical climate, abbreviated "Cfa" on climate maps.

== Demographics ==
Historical population
Census	Pop.	Note	%±
1910	765		—
1920	774		1.2%
1930	609		−21.3%
1940	455		−25.3%
1950	390		−14.3%
1960	361		−7.4%
1970	294		−18.6%
1980	278		−5.4%
1990	205		−26.3%
2000	177		−13.7%
2010	145		−18.1%
2020	103		−29.0%
2021 (est.)	101	▼	−1.9%
U.S. Decennial Census

=== 2010 census ===
At the 2010 census there were 145 people, 63 households, and 39 families living in the town. The population density was 500.0 inhabitants per square mile (193.1/km^{2}). There were 92 housing units at an average density of 317.2 per square mile (122.5/km^{2}). The racial makeup of the town was 97.2% White, 0.7% Native American, and 2.1% from two or more races. Of the 63 households 31.7% had children under the age of 18 living with them, 39.7% were married couples living together, 9.5% had a female householder with no husband present, 12.7% had a male householder with no wife present, and 38.1% were non-families. 36.5% of households were one person and 14.2% were one person aged 65 or older. The average household size was 2.30 and the average family size was 3.03.

The median age in the town was 44.8 years. 22.8% of residents were under the age of 18; 6.1% were between the ages of 18 and 24; 21.3% were from 25 to 44; 32.4% were from 45 to 64; and 17.2% were 65 or older. The gender makeup of the town was 47.6% male and 52.4% female.

=== 2000 census ===
At the 2000 census there were 177 people, 77 households, and 49 families living in the town. The population density was 703.4 inhabitants per square mile (273.4/km^{2}). There were 98 housing units at an average density of 389.5 per square mile (151.4/km^{2}). The racial makeup of the town was 100.00% White. Hispanic or Latino of any race were 1.13%.

Of the 77 households 23.4% had children under the age of 18 living with them, 39.0% were married couples living together, 15.6% had a female householder with no husband present, and 35.1% were non-families. 29.9% of households were one person and 16.9% were one person aged 65 or older. The average household size was 2.30 and the average family size was 2.82.

The age distribution was 19.8% under the age of 18, 11.9% from 18 to 24, 24.3% from 25 to 44, 19.8% from 45 to 64, and 24.3% 65 or older. The median age was 42 years. For every 100 females, there were 108.2 males. For every 100 females age 18 and over, there were 97.2 males.

The median household income was $78,500 and the median family income was $92,188. Males had a median income of $73,125 versus $35,000 for females. The per capita income for the town was $58,279. About 1.8% of families and 2.9% of the population were below the poverty line, including 43.9% of those under the age of eighteen and 13.2% of those sixty five or over.
