= Wheat, West Virginia =

Wheat
- Unincorporated community
- Location within the state of West Virginia Wheat (the United States)
- Coordinates: 39°37′35″N 80°35′41″W
- Country: United States
- State: West Virginia
- County: Wetzel
- Elevation: 1,040 ft (320 m)
- Time zone: UTC-5 (Eastern (EST))
  - Summer (DST): UTC-4 (EDT)
- GNIS ID: 1555963

Wheat is an unincorporated community in Wetzel County, West Virginia, United States. Its post office opened in 1837, closed in 1950.

The community was named for wheat fields near the original town site.
