= 1928 United States presidential election in West Virginia =

- November 6, 1928

Nominee	Herbert Hoover	Al Smith
Party	Republican	Democratic
Home state	California	New York
Running mate	Charles Curtis	Joseph T. Robinson
Electoral vote	8	0
Popular vote	375,551	263,784
Percentage	58.43%	41.04%
County results
Hoover
50–60%
60–70%
70–80%
80–90%
Smith
50–60%
President before election
Calvin Coolidge
Republican
Elected President
Herbert Hoover
Republican

The 1928 United States presidential election in West Virginia took place on November 6, 1928, as part of the 1928 United States presidential election which was held throughout all contemporary 48 states. Voters chose eight representatives, or electors to the Electoral College, who voted for president and vice president.

West Virginia voted for the Republican nominee, former Secretary of Commerce Herbert Hoover of California, over the Democratic nominee, Governor Alfred E. Smith of New York. Hoover's running mate was Senate Majority Leader Charles Curtis of Kansas, while Smith ran with Senator Joseph Taylor Robinson of Arkansas.

Hoover won the state by a margin of 17.39 percent; historians have attributed this margin to Appalachian anti-Catholicism against New Yorker Smith. This was the last time that a non-incumbent Republican won West Virginia until 2000. Hoover was the only Republican to carry Logan County until John McCain in 2008, the first-ever Republican victor in Wetzel County, the first Republican since Ulysses S. Grant in 1868 to carry Greenbrier County, and the first Republican since Abraham Lincoln in 1864 to carry Wayne County.

== Results ==
1928 United States presidential election in West Virginia
Party	Candidate	Votes	Percentage	Electoral votes
Republican	Herbert Hoover	375,551	58.43%	8
Democratic	Alfred E. Smith	263,784	41.04%	0
Prohibition	William F. Varney	1,703	0.26%	0
Socialist	Norman Thomas	1,313	0.20%	0
Workers	William Z. Foster	401	0.06%	0
N/A	Write-ins	9 (Note: These votes were listed as a state-wide total and not separated by county.)	0.01%	0
Totals		642,752	100.00%	8

=== Results by county ===
1928 United States presidential election in West Virginia by county
County	Herbert Hoover Republican		Al Smith Democratic		William F. Varney Prohibition		Norman Thomas Socialist		William Z. Foster Workers		Margin		Total votes cast
County	#	%	#	%	#	%	#	%	#	%	#	%	Total votes cast
Barbour	4,023	53.54%	3,491	46.46%	0	0.00%	0	0.00%	0	0.00%	532	7.08%	7,514
Berkeley	8,477	70.30%	3,540	29.36%	23	0.19%	16	0.13%	3	0.02%	4,937	40.94%	12,059
Boone	4,000	45.27%	4,805	54.39%	9	0.10%	16	0.18%	5	0.06%	-805	-9.11%	8,835
Braxton	4,028	46.56%	4,582	52.96%	32	0.37%	6	0.07%	3	0.03%	-554	-6.40%	8,651
Brooke	5,277	68.14%	2,419	31.24%	16	0.21%	16	0.21%	16	0.21%	2,858	36.91%	7,744
Cabell	21,091	57.65%	15,340	41.93%	84	0.23%	47	0.13%	21	0.06%	5,751	15.72%	36,583
Calhoun	1,745	44.27%	2,179	55.28%	11	0.28%	7	0.18%	0	0.00%	-434	-11.01%	3,942
Clay	2,551	56.76%	1,929	42.92%	5	0.11%	2	0.04%	7	0.16%	622	13.84%	4,494
Doddridge	2,919	70.83%	1,202	29.17%	0	0.00%	0	0.00%	0	0.00%	1,717	41.66%	4,121
Fayette	12,961	51.00%	12,351	48.60%	60	0.24%	38	0.15%	6	0.02%	610	2.40%	25,416
Gilmer	1,705	42.16%	2,313	57.20%	17	0.42%	2	0.05%	7	0.17%	-608	-15.03%	4,044
Grant	2,648	82.83%	542	16.95%	4	0.13%	2	0.06%	1	0.03%	2,106	65.87%	3,197
Greenbrier	6,423	50.88%	6,141	48.65%	32	0.25%	18	0.14%	10	0.08%	282	2.23%	12,624
Hampshire	1,779	45.31%	2,132	54.30%	15	0.38%	0	0.00%	0	0.00%	-353	-8.99%	3,926
Hancock	5,461	74.06%	1,884	25.55%	17	0.23%	12	0.16%	0	0.00%	3,577	48.51%	7,374
Hardy	1,611	44.97%	1,965	54.86%	3	0.08%	3	0.08%	0	0.00%	-354	-9.88%	3,582
Harrison	17,502	57.70%	12,483	41.16%	232	0.76%	98	0.32%	16	0.05%	5,019	16.55%	30,331
Jackson	4,150	62.86%	2,452	37.14%	0	0.00%	0	0.00%	0	0.00%	1,698	25.72%	6,602
Jefferson	3,050	47.78%	3,312	51.88%	15	0.23%	6	0.09%	1	0.02%	-262	-4.10%	6,384
Kanawha	35,788	58.16%	25,563	41.54%	80	0.13%	70	0.11%	34	0.06%	10,225	16.62%	61,535
Lewis	5,290	57.37%	3,825	41.48%	81	0.88%	19	0.21%	6	0.07%	1,465	15.89%	9,221
Lincoln	3,823	52.81%	3,416	47.19%	0	0.00%	0	0.00%	0	0.00%	407	5.62%	7,239
Logan	11,404	53.32%	9,944	46.49%	30	0.14%	7	0.03%	4	0.02%	1,460	6.83%	21,389
Marion	16,088	60.34%	10,133	38.00%	106	0.40%	315	1.18%	21	0.08%	5,955	22.33%	26,663
Marshall	9,204	65.22%	4,785	33.91%	51	0.36%	39	0.28%	33	0.23%	4,419	31.31%	14,112
Mason	5,125	64.13%	2,814	35.21%	22	0.28%	21	0.26%	10	0.13%	2,311	28.92%	7,992
McDowell	14,810	64.02%	8,294	35.85%	10	0.04%	11	0.05%	10	0.04%	6,516	28.17%	23,135
Mercer	12,887	55.52%	10,273	44.26%	36	0.16%	12	0.05%	2	0.01%	2,614	11.26%	23,210
Mineral	5,860	71.36%	2,310	28.13%	11	0.13%	25	0.30%	6	0.07%	3,550	43.23%	8,212
Mingo	6,904	50.28%	6,801	49.53%	17	0.12%	7	0.05%	3	0.02%	103	0.75%	13,732
Monongalia	11,364	64.08%	6,182	34.86%	89	0.50%	91	0.51%	8	0.05%	5,182	29.22%	17,734
Monroe	3,025	56.14%	2,346	43.54%	14	0.26%	2	0.04%	1	0.02%	679	12.60%	5,388
Morgan	2,539	76.75%	758	22.91%	4	0.12%	6	0.18%	1	0.03%	1,781	53.84%	3,308
Nicholas	3,917	52.36%	3,495	46.72%	52	0.70%	8	0.11%	9	0.12%	422	5.64%	7,481
Ohio	20,064	60.04%	13,132	39.30%	41	0.12%	122	0.37%	56	0.17%	6,932	20.75%	33,415
Pendleton	1,710	47.09%	1,921	52.91%	0	0.00%	0	0.00%	0	0.00%	-211	-5.81%	3,631
Pleasants	1,821	60.06%	1,210	39.91%	1	0.03%	0	0.00%	0	0.00%	611	20.15%	3,032
Pocahontas	3,141	55.55%	2,487	43.99%	21	0.37%	4	0.07%	1	0.02%	654	11.57%	5,654
Preston	7,783	76.18%	2,355	23.05%	45	0.44%	22	0.22%	11	0.11%	5,428	53.13%	10,216
Putnam	3,346	57.76%	2,406	41.53%	21	0.36%	15	0.26%	5	0.09%	940	16.23%	5,793
Raleigh	11,581	52.77%	10,366	47.23%	0	0.00%	0	0.00%	0	0.00%	1,215	5.54%	21,947
Randolph	4,436	46.22%	5,085	52.99%	28	0.29%	40	0.42%	8	0.08%	-649	-6.76%	9,597
Ritchie	4,195	70.40%	1,711	28.71%	41	0.69%	10	0.17%	2	0.03%	2,484	41.68%	5,959
Roane	4,472	59.54%	3,007	40.03%	18	0.24%	7	0.09%	7	0.09%	1,465	19.50%	7,511
Summers	4,063	51.88%	3,752	47.91%	12	0.15%	2	0.03%	3	0.04%	311	3.97%	7,832
Taylor	5,101	66.20%	2,548	33.07%	30	0.39%	19	0.25%	7	0.09%	2,553	33.13%	7,705
Tucker	2,525	51.83%	2,263	46.45%	19	0.39%	56	1.15%	9	0.18%	262	5.38%	4,872
Tyler	3,881	70.14%	1,591	28.75%	41	0.74%	7	0.13%	13	0.23%	2,290	41.39%	5,533
Upshur	5,277	75.20%	1,683	23.98%	36	0.51%	16	0.23%	5	0.07%	3,594	51.22%	7,017
Wayne	5,630	51.89%	5,177	47.72%	18	0.17%	16	0.15%	8	0.07%	453	4.18%	10,849
Webster	1,936	45.53%	2,306	54.23%	6	0.14%	3	0.07%	1	0.02%	-370	-8.70%	4,252
Wetzel	4,428	51.86%	4,052	47.45%	32	0.37%	20	0.23%	7	0.08%	376	4.40%	8,539
Wirt	1,561	54.41%	1,272	44.34%	34	1.19%	2	0.07%	0	0.00%	289	10.07%	2,869
Wood	15,184	69.90%	6,412	29.52%	81	0.37%	30	0.14%	14	0.06%	8,772	40.38%	21,721
Wyoming	3,987	56.68%	3,047	43.32%	0	0.00%	0	0.00%	0	0.00%	940	13.36%	7,034
Totals	375,551	58.43%	263,784	41.04%	1,703	0.26%	1,313	0.20%	401	0.06%	111,767	17.39%	642,752
