= Earnshaw, West Virginia =

Unincorporated community in West Virginia, United States

Earnshaw
- Unincorporated community
- Location within the state of West Virginia Earnshaw (the United States)
- Coordinates: 39°37′21″N 80°28′03″W
- Country: United States
- State: West Virginia
- County: Wetzel
- Time zone: UTC-5 (Eastern (EST))
  - Summer (DST): UTC-4 (EDT)

Earnshaw (also Lewistown) is an unincorporated community in Wetzel County, West Virginia, United States. It lies at an elevation of 1,070 feet (326 m).
