= Rockport, Wetzel County, West Virginia =

Rockport, West Virginia
- Unincorporated community
- Location within the state of West Virginia Rockport, West Virginia (the United States)
- Coordinates: 39°42′27″N 80°34′52″W
- Country: United States
- State: West Virginia
- County: Wetzel
- Elevation: 892 ft (272 m)
- Time zone: UTC-5 (Eastern (EST))
  - Summer (DST): UTC-4 (EDT)
- ZIP codes: 26169
- GNIS feature ID: 1555507

Rockport is an unincorporated community in Wetzel County, West Virginia, United States. It lies at an elevation of 892 feet (272 m).
