= 2014 West Virginia elections =

- November 4, 2014
- Registered: 1,225,926
- Turnout: 462,864; 37.8% (▼17.2%)

West Virginia held elections on November 4, 2014. Elections to the United States House of Representatives, as well as the House of Delegates and 17 of 34 Senate seats were held. These elections were held concurrently with other elections nationwide. Primary elections were held on May 13, 2014.

== Federal offices ==
=== House of Representatives ===
Incumbent David McKinley was easily re-elected to the 1st district, while in the 2nd district, Republican Alex Mooney narrowly won the election to replace outgoing incumbent Shelley Moore Capito, who retired to run for Senate. In the 3rd district, longtime incumbent Democrat Nick Rahall was defeated by Republican Evan Jenkins by a 10-point margin. 2014 marks the first time since 1920 that West Virginia elected an entirely Republican House delegation.

=== Senate ===
Incumbent Democratic senator Jay Rockefeller retired, leaving an open seat. Republican congresswoman Shelley Moore Capito defeated Democratic secretary of state Natalie Tennant by a 27.6 point margin, a near flip from the results of the seat's last election, in which Rockefeller defeated the Republican nominee by 27.4 points.

== State Legislature ==
=== State Senate ===
17 of the Senate's 34 seats were up for election in 2014, including 3 Republicans and 14 Democrats. Democrats Evan Jenkins, Samuel J. Cann, and Brooks McCabe retired. Jenkins retired to run for House of Representatives as a Republican. Republicans won 11 of the 17 seats up for election, tying the chamber 17–17. However, Democratic senator Daniel Hall changed his party affililiation to Republican, giving the GOP a majority going into the 82nd Legislature.

Party	Leader	Before	After	Change
Republican	Mike Hall	10	17	▲7
Democratic	Jeff Kessler	24	17	▼7
Total		34	34	

=== House of Delegates ===
All 100 seats in the House of Delegates were up for election in 2014. 15 members retired or lost renomination, including 10 Democrats and 5 Republicans. Republicans won 64 of the 100 seats, flipping the chamber's control from the Democrats for the first time in 83 years.

Party	Leader	Before	After	Change
Republican	Tim Armstead	47	64	▲17
Democratic	Tim Miley	53	36	▼17
Total		100	100	
