= 1996 United States presidential election in West Virginia =

- November 5, 1996
- Turnout: 67.30%

Nominee	Bill Clinton	Bob Dole	Ross Perot
Party	Democratic	Republican	Reform
Home state	Arkansas	Kansas	Texas
Running mate	Al Gore	Jack Kemp	Patrick Choate
Electoral vote	5	0	0
Popular vote	327,812	233,946	71,639
Percentage	51.51%	36.76%	11.26%

Clinton
40–50%
50–60%
60–70%
70–80%
Dole
40–50%
50–60%
60–70%
President before election
Bill Clinton
Democratic
Elected President
Bill Clinton
Democratic

The 1996 United States presidential election in West Virginia took place on November 5, 1996, as part of the 1996 United States presidential election. Voters chose five representatives, or electors to the Electoral College, who voted for president and vice president.

West Virginia was easily won by President Bill Clinton (D-AR) over Senator Bob Dole (R-KS), with Clinton winning 51.51% to 36.76% by a margin of 14.75%. Billionaire businessman Ross Perot (Reform-TX) finished in third, with 11.26% of the popular vote.

As of 2024, this is the last time that West Virginia supported a Democratic nominee, as Republican George W. Bush would narrowly win the state four years later.

Hillary Clinton lost the state twenty years later by more than 40 points without carrying a single county. However, she won neighboring Virginia, which Bill Clinton did not win either time.

This was also the last election in which Mason County, Cabell County, Roane County, Ohio County, Jackson County, Pendleton County, Mercer County, Pleasants County, Monroe County, Lewis County, Hardy County, Raleigh County, Wayne County, Greenbrier County, Marshall County, Hancock County, Randolph County, Nicholas County, Taylor County, Barbour County, Wetzel County, Summers County, Calhoun County, Clay County, Gilmer County, Pocahontas County, Tyler County, and Tucker County voted for a Democratic presidential candidate.

== Primary elections ==
=== Democratic primary ===
1996 West Virginia Democratic presidential primary
- May 12, 1996

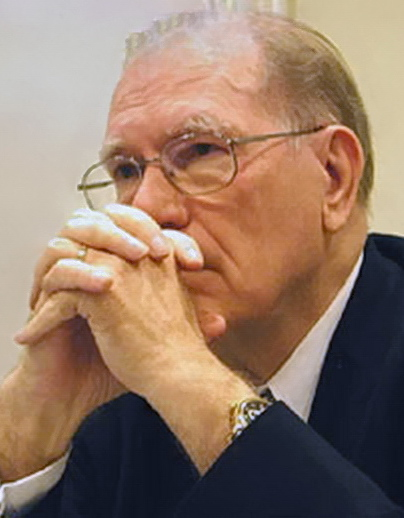
Candidate	Bill Clinton	Lyndon LaRouche
Home state	Arkansas	Virginia
Delegate count	28	0
Popular vote	257,087	40,034
Percentage	86.53%	13.47%
County results
Clinton
70–80%
80–90%
>90%

The West Virginia Democratic presidential primary was held on May 12 in the U.S. state of West Virginia as one of the Democratic Party's statewide nomination contests ahead of the 1996 presidential election.

While incumbent president Bill Clinton comfortably won the contest by a 73-point margin, West Virginia was Lyndon LaRouche's best state, amassing 13% of the vote.

== Results ==
1996 United States presidential election in West Virginia
Party	Candidate	Running mate	Popular vote		Electoral vote		Swing
Party	Candidate	Running mate	Count	%	Count	%	Swing
Democratic	Bill Clinton of Arkansas (incumbent)	Al Gore of Tennessee (incumbent)	327,812	51.51%	5	100.00%	▲3.10%
Republican	Bob Dole of Kansas	Jack Kemp of New York	233,946	36.76%	0	0.00%	▲1.37%
Reform	Ross Perot of Texas	Patrick Choate of Washington, D.C.	71,639	11.26%	0	0.00%	▼4.66%
Libertarian	Harry Browne of Tennessee	Jo Jorgensen of South Carolina	3,062	0.48%	0	0.00%	▲0.21%
Total			636,459	100.00%	5	100.00%	

=== Results by congressional district ===
Clinton won all three congressional districts.

District	Clinton	Dole	Other	Representative
1st	49%	38%	13%	Alan Mollohan
2nd	49%	40%	11%	Bob Wise
3rd	58%	32%	10%	Nick Rahall

=== Results by county ===
County	Bill Clinton Democratic		Bob Dole Republican		Ross Perot Reform		Harry E. Browne Libertarian		Margin		Total votes cast
County	#	%	#	%	#	%	#	%	#	%	Total votes cast
Barbour	3,076	50.87%	2,155	35.64%	784	12.97%	32	0.53%	921	15.23%	6,047
Berkeley	8,321	40.44%	9,859	47.92%	2,291	11.13%	105	0.51%	-1,538	-7.48%	20,576
Boone	6,048	67.79%	1,917	21.49%	927	10.39%	30	0.34%	4,131	46.30%	8,922
Braxton	3,001	60.07%	1,441	28.84%	527	10.55%	27	0.54%	1,560	31.23%	4,996
Brooke	5,338	56.19%	2,741	28.85%	1,375	14.47%	46	0.48%	2,597	27.34%	9,500
Cabell	16,277	49.99%	13,179	40.48%	2,968	9.12%	136	0.42%	3,098	9.51%	32,560
Calhoun	1,402	51.45%	1,000	36.70%	307	11.27%	16	0.59%	402	14.75%	2,725
Clay	2,074	57.98%	1,137	31.79%	355	9.92%	11	0.31%	937	26.19%	3,577
Doddridge	865	33.33%	1,335	51.45%	382	14.72%	13	0.50%	-470	-18.12%	2,595
Fayette	9,471	64.18%	3,669	24.86%	1,552	10.52%	66	0.45%	5,802	39.32%	14,758
Gilmer	1,390	52.47%	933	35.22%	316	11.93%	10	0.38%	457	17.25%	2,649
Grant	1,206	28.07%	2,599	60.48%	481	11.19%	11	0.26%	-1,393	-32.41%	4,297
Greenbrier	6,286	51.55%	4,434	36.36%	1,418	11.63%	56	0.46%	1,852	15.19%	12,194
Hampshire	2,335	40.39%	2,814	48.68%	605	10.47%	27	0.47%	-479	-8.29%	5,781
Hancock	7,521	53.64%	4,268	30.44%	2,158	15.39%	73	0.52%	3,253	23.20%	14,020
Hardy	1,911	44.87%	1,895	44.49%	438	10.28%	15	0.35%	16	0.38%	4,259
Harrison	14,746	54.93%	8,857	33.00%	3,135	11.68%	105	0.39%	5,889	21.93%	26,843
Jackson	4,882	46.73%	4,235	40.54%	1,295	12.40%	35	0.34%	647	6.19%	10,447
Jefferson	6,361	48.68%	5,287	40.46%	1,307	10.00%	113	0.86%	1,074	8.22%	13,068
Kanawha	40,357	52.76%	29,311	38.32%	6,412	8.38%	415	0.54%	11,046	14.44%	76,495
Lewis	2,868	46.46%	2,285	37.02%	974	15.78%	46	0.75%	583	9.44%	6,173
Lincoln	4,994	60.64%	2,530	30.72%	696	8.45%	15	0.18%	2,464	29.92%	8,235
Logan	10,840	72.00%	2,627	17.45%	1,532	10.18%	57	0.38%	8,213	54.55%	15,056
Marion	12,994	58.78%	6,160	27.86%	2,881	13.03%	72	0.33%	6,834	30.92%	22,107
Marshall	7,045	51.11%	4,460	32.35%	2,202	15.97%	78	0.57%	2,585	18.76%	13,785
Mason	5,284	50.65%	3,581	34.32%	1,533	14.69%	35	0.34%	1,703	16.33%	10,433
McDowell	5,989	72.97%	1,550	18.88%	655	7.98%	14	0.17%	4,439	54.09%	8,208
Mercer	8,721	46.64%	7,768	41.54%	2,141	11.45%	70	0.37%	953	5.10%	18,700
Mineral	3,487	38.42%	4,380	48.26%	1,170	12.89%	39	0.43%	-893	-9.84%	9,076
Mingo	7,584	69.74%	2,229	20.50%	1,020	9.38%	42	0.39%	5,355	49.24%	10,875
Monongalia	13,406	49.99%	10,189	37.99%	3,040	11.33%	185	0.69%	3,217	12.00%	26,820
Monroe	2,382	46.78%	2,131	41.85%	559	10.98%	20	0.39%	251	4.93%	5,092
Morgan	1,929	37.97%	2,599	51.16%	513	10.10%	39	0.77%	-670	-13.19%	5,080
Nicholas	4,769	55.87%	2,649	31.03%	1,071	12.55%	47	0.55%	2,120	24.84%	8,536
Ohio	8,781	48.23%	7,267	39.92%	2,065	11.34%	93	0.51%	1,514	8.31%	18,206
Pendleton	1,591	48.10%	1,431	43.26%	276	8.34%	10	0.30%	160	4.84%	3,308
Pleasants	1,478	46.61%	1,265	39.89%	416	13.12%	12	0.38%	213	6.72%	3,171
Pocahontas	1,796	51.59%	1,242	35.68%	426	12.24%	17	0.49%	554	15.91%	3,481
Preston	4,237	41.11%	4,257	41.31%	1,760	17.08%	52	0.50%	-20	-0.20%	10,306
Putnam	8,029	42.69%	8,803	46.80%	1,901	10.11%	76	0.40%	-774	-4.11%	18,809
Raleigh	12,547	53.12%	8,628	36.53%	2,355	9.97%	92	0.39%	3,919	16.59%	23,622
Randolph	5,469	54.21%	3,348	33.18%	1,184	11.74%	88	0.87%	2,121	21.03%	10,089
Ritchie	1,385	36.15%	1,906	49.75%	522	13.63%	18	0.47%	-521	-13.60%	3,831
Roane	2,572	48.71%	2,069	39.19%	622	11.78%	17	0.32%	503	9.52%	5,280
Summers	2,397	54.94%	1,505	34.49%	438	10.04%	23	0.53%	892	20.45%	4,363
Taylor	2,692	48.65%	1,977	35.73%	844	15.25%	20	0.36%	715	12.92%	5,533
Tucker	1,649	49.79%	1,217	36.75%	424	12.80%	22	0.66%	432	13.04%	3,312
Tyler	1,459	52.48%	734	26.40%	563	20.25%	24	0.86%	725	26.08%	2,780
Upshur	3,052	40.98%	3,325	44.65%	1,031	13.84%	39	0.52%	-273	-3.67%	7,447
Wayne	8,300	53.63%	5,492	35.49%	1,633	10.55%	51	0.33%	2,808	18.14%	15,476
Webster	2,292	68.81%	654	19.63%	369	11.08%	16	0.48%	1,638	49.18%	3,331
Wetzel	3,209	51.12%	2,037	32.45%	1,004	15.99%	27	0.43%	1,172	18.67%	6,277
Wirt	906	42.52%	928	43.55%	280	13.14%	17	0.80%	-22	-1.03%	2,131
Wood	13,261	40.59%	15,502	47.45%	3,694	11.31%	215	0.66%	-2,241	-6.86%	32,672
Wyoming	5,550	64.92%	2,155	25.21%	812	9.50%	32	0.37%	3,395	39.71%	8,549
Totals	327,812	51.51%	233,946	36.76%	71,639	11.26%	3,062	0.48%	93,866	14.75%	636,459

==== County that flipped from Democratic to Republican ====
- Wirt

==== Counties that flipped from Republican to Democratic ====
- Hardy
- Tyler
