= 1984 United States presidential election in West Virginia =

- November 6, 1984
- Turnout: 72.3% (of registered voters) ▲51.7% (of voting age population) ▼

Nominee	Ronald Reagan	Walter Mondale
Party	Republican	Democratic
Home state	California	Minnesota
Running mate	George H. W. Bush	Geraldine Ferraro
Electoral vote	6	0
Popular vote	405,483	328,125
Percentage	55.11%	44.60%
County results
Reagan
50–60%
60–70%
70–80%
80–90%
Mondale
50–60%
60–70%
President before election
Ronald Reagan
Republican
Elected President
Ronald Reagan
Republican

The 1984 United States presidential election in West Virginia took place on November 6, 1984. All 50 states and the District of Columbia, were part of the 1984 United States presidential election. West Virginia voters chose 6 electors to the Electoral College, which selected the president and vice president of the United States. West Virginia was won by incumbent United States President Ronald Reagan of California, who was running against former Vice President Walter Mondale of Minnesota. Reagan ran for a second time with incumbent Vice President and former C.I.A. Director George H. W. Bush of Texas, and Mondale ran with Representative Geraldine Ferraro of New York, the first major female candidate for the vice presidency.

The presidential election of 1984 was a very partisan election for West Virginia, with over 99% of the electorate voting for either the Democratic or Republican parties, and only five parties appearing on the ballot. Most counties turned out for Reagan except for a bloc of heavily unionized, coal-dependent counties in the southern part of the state bordering Virginia and Kentucky.

Reagan won the election in West Virginia by a decisive 10.6 percentage point margin. While a comfortable victory, this made West Virginia 7.6 percentage points more Democratic than the nation at large, as well as Walter Mondale's ninth-best state. Mondale's greatest strength came from heavily unionized southern West Virginia, where he broke 60% in McDowell, Logan, Mingo, Boone, and Fayette Counties; he also carried a number of counties in central West Virginia and two in the Northern Panhandle. Reagan comfortably carried Kanawha County, the state's biggest county and one that was less typically Democratic at the time than some others in the state (having voted to re-elect Carter by only 0.3 percent), and also carried the state's other then-typically Democratic population centers, Harrison County (Clarksburg), Raleigh County (Beckley), and Monongalia County (Morgantown), by margins ranging from narrow to substantial. He won the swing population center of Cabell County (Huntington) by about the same as his national margin, and got over 2/3 of the vote in the state's largest typically Republican county, Wood County (Parkersburg).

West Virginia did not vote for a Republican again in a presidential race until 2000, after which the state has always gone Republican. West Virginia was one of five states, alongside Georgia, Hawaii, Maryland and Rhode Island, that Reagan lost in 1980 but won in 1984.

== Results ==
1984 United States presidential election in West Virginia
Party	Candidate	Votes	Percentage	Electoral votes
Republican	Ronald Reagan (incumbent)	405,483	55.11%	6
Democratic	Walter Mondale	328,125	44.60%	0
America First	Bob Richards	996	0.14%	0
Socialist Workers Party	Melvin Mason	645	0.09%	0
New Alliance Party	Dennis Serrette	493	0.07%	0
Totals		735,742	100.00%	6

=== Results by county ===
County	Ronald Reagan Republican		Walter Mondale Democratic		Bob Richards Populist		Melvin Mason Socialist Workers		Dennis Serrette New Alliance		Margin		Total
County	#	%	#	%	#	%	#	%	#	%	#	%	Total
Barbour	3,877	55.43%	3,108	44.43%	6	0.09%	2	0.03%	2	0.03%	769	11.00%	6,995
Berkeley	12,887	67.50%	6,181	32.37%	14	0.07%	7	0.04%	3	0.02%	6,706	35.13%	19,092
Boone	4,656	39.39%	7,121	60.24%	19	0.16%	16	0.14%	9	0.08%	-2,465	-20.85%	11,821
Braxton	2,902	46.32%	3,350	53.47%	7	0.11%	3	0.05%	3	0.05%	-448	-7.15%	6,265
Brooke	4,819	41.91%	6,636	57.71%	18	0.16%	13	0.11%	12	0.10%	-1,817	-15.80%	11,498
Cabell	21,815	58.26%	15,513	41.43%	56	0.15%	33	0.09%	28	0.07%	6,302	16.83%	37,445
Calhoun	1,765	53.88%	1,473	44.96%	8	0.24%	29	0.89%	1	0.03%	292	8.92%	3,276
Clay	1,667	43.91%	2,117	55.77%	5	0.13%	5	0.13%	2	0.05%	-450	-11.86%	3,796
Doddridge	2,343	73.33%	836	26.17%	9	0.28%	4	0.13%	3	0.09%	1,507	47.16%	3,195
Fayette	7,360	38.56%	11,650	61.04%	46	0.24%	16	0.08%	14	0.07%	-4,290	-22.48%	19,086
Gilmer	1,953	56.58%	1,494	43.28%	4	0.12%	1	0.03%	0	0.00%	459	13.30%	3,452
Grant	3,715	81.58%	828	18.18%	4	0.09%	4	0.09%	3	0.07%	2,887	63.40%	4,554
Greenbrier	7,337	56.55%	5,599	43.16%	18	0.14%	9	0.07%	11	0.08%	1,738	13.39%	12,974
Hampshire	4,065	65.70%	2,102	33.97%	8	0.13%	4	0.06%	8	0.13%	1,963	31.73%	6,187
Hancock	7,326	45.44%	8,708	54.01%	34	0.21%	28	0.17%	28	0.17%	-1,382	-8.57%	16,124
Hardy	2,938	64.05%	1,641	35.78%	2	0.04%	2	0.04%	4	0.09%	1,297	28.27%	4,587
Harrison	19,400	56.33%	14,969	43.47%	32	0.09%	21	0.06%	15	0.04%	4,431	12.86%	34,437
Jackson	7,117	62.93%	4,147	36.67%	24	0.21%	7	0.06%	15	0.13%	2,970	26.26%	11,310
Jefferson	5,884	58.06%	4,216	41.60%	18	0.18%	10	0.10%	6	0.06%	1,668	16.46%	10,134
Kanawha	51,499	57.51%	37,832	42.25%	81	0.09%	84	0.09%	46	0.05%	13,667	15.26%	89,542
Lewis	5,297	65.96%	2,693	33.53%	32	0.40%	9	0.11%	0	0.00%	2,604	32.43%	8,031
Lincoln	4,405	44.49%	5,467	55.21%	15	0.15%	11	0.11%	4	0.04%	-1,062	-10.72%	9,902
Logan	6,425	36.96%	10,892	62.66%	23	0.13%	25	0.14%	17	0.10%	-4,467	-25.70%	17,382
Marion	13,106	48.50%	13,833	51.20%	52	0.19%	24	0.09%	5	0.02%	-727	-2.70%	27,020
Marshall	8,615	51.85%	7,947	47.83%	17	0.10%	13	0.08%	24	0.14%	668	4.02%	16,616
Mason	6,648	53.64%	5,701	46.00%	17	0.14%	11	0.09%	16	0.13%	947	7.64%	12,393
McDowell	4,284	33.25%	8,546	66.34%	13	0.10%	31	0.24%	9	0.07%	-4,262	-33.09%	12,883
Mercer	13,910	60.07%	9,164	39.58%	43	0.19%	20	0.09%	18	0.08%	4,746	20.49%	23,155
Mineral	7,291	65.46%	3,832	34.40%	10	0.09%	4	0.04%	1	0.01%	3,459	31.06%	11,138
Mingo	4,275	33.59%	8,434	66.27%	6	0.05%	7	0.06%	4	0.03%	-4,159	-32.68%	12,726
Monongalia	14,972	52.95%	13,236	46.81%	23	0.08%	27	0.10%	16	0.06%	1,736	6.14%	28,274
Monroe	3,612	60.67%	2,333	39.18%	5	0.08%	3	0.05%	1	0.02%	1,279	21.49%	5,954
Morgan	3,469	70.34%	1,457	29.54%	5	0.10%	1	0.02%	0	0.00%	2,012	40.80%	4,932
Nicholas	4,656	50.21%	4,588	49.48%	16	0.17%	5	0.05%	8	0.09%	68	0.73%	9,273
Ohio	13,447	56.83%	10,163	42.95%	24	0.10%	13	0.05%	15	0.06%	3,284	13.88%	23,662
Pendleton	2,047	58.19%	1,464	41.61%	5	0.14%	2	0.06%	0	0.00%	583	16.58%	3,518
Pleasants	2,255	60.54%	1,458	39.14%	6	0.16%	2	0.05%	4	0.11%	797	21.40%	3,725
Pocahontas	2,479	56.52%	1,903	43.39%	2	0.05%	1	0.02%	1	0.02%	576	13.13%	4,386
Preston	6,955	63.05%	4,054	36.75%	8	0.07%	7	0.06%	7	0.06%	2,901	26.30%	11,031
Putnam	9,238	63.75%	5,208	35.94%	20	0.14%	13	0.09%	13	0.09%	4,030	27.81%	14,492
Raleigh	14,571	50.03%	14,442	49.59%	68	0.23%	24	0.08%	17	0.06%	129	0.44%	29,122
Randolph	6,100	55.64%	4,839	44.14%	11	0.10%	7	0.06%	7	0.06%	1,261	11.50%	10,964
Ritchie	3,355	72.79%	1,231	26.71%	17	0.37%	5	0.11%	1	0.02%	2,124	46.08%	4,609
Roane	3,751	60.11%	2,468	39.55%	9	0.14%	8	0.13%	4	0.06%	1,283	20.56%	6,240
Summers	2,975	52.57%	2,670	47.18%	4	0.07%	4	0.07%	6	0.11%	305	5.39%	5,659
Taylor	4,007	59.23%	2,754	40.71%	1	0.01%	2	0.03%	1	0.01%	1,253	18.52%	6,765
Tucker	2,240	55.80%	1,766	44.00%	8	0.20%	0	0.00%	0	0.00%	474	11.80%	4,014
Tyler	3,170	69.29%	1,395	30.49%	3	0.07%	4	0.09%	3	0.07%	1,775	38.80%	4,575
Upshur	5,951	70.29%	2,468	29.15%	26	0.31%	5	0.06%	16	0.19%	3,483	41.14%	8,466
Wayne	8,811	51.12%	8,378	48.61%	23	0.13%	11	0.06%	13	0.08%	433	2.51%	17,236
Webster	1,565	39.86%	2,355	59.98%	5	0.13%	1	0.03%	0	0.00%	-790	-20.12%	3,926
Wetzel	4,626	56.37%	3,549	43.24%	7	0.09%	15	0.18%	10	0.12%	1,077	13.13%	8,207
Wirt	1,450	62.45%	868	37.38%	1	0.04%	3	0.13%	0	0.00%	582	25.07%	2,322
Wood	24,821	68.42%	11,357	31.30%	66	0.18%	18	0.05%	17	0.05%	13,464	37.12%	36,279
Wyoming	5,379	48.48%	5,691	51.29%	10	0.09%	15	0.14%	0	0.00%	-312	-2.81%	11,095
Total	405,483	55.11%	328,125	44.60%	996	0.14%	645	0.09%	493	0.07%	77,358	10.51%	735,742

==== Counties that flipped from Democratic to Republican ====
- Barbour
- Calhoun
- Gilmer
- Greenbrier
- Harrison
- Jefferson
- Kanawha
- Marshall
- Monongalia
- Nicholas
- Pendleton
- Pocahontas
- Raleigh
- Randolph
- Summers
- Taylor
- Tucker
- Wayne
- Wetzel

== Analysis ==
Reagan's best county was the Unionist and ancestrally Republican Grant County, where no Democrat has ever reached forty percent and which gave Reagan over eighty percent of its ballots. His strongest performances, in general, were in the northeast of the state, where, along with strong support from Grant and likewise unionist and ancestrally Republican Morgan County, he also did well in Hampshire and Hardy Counties, which had begun to transition from typically Democratic to typically Republican in 1968; and along the middle portion of West Virginia's river border with Ohio. Both were typically Republican-leaning regions within what was otherwise an overall Democratic state at the time.

== See also ==
- Presidency of Ronald Reagan
- United States presidential elections in West Virginia
