= Knob Fork (West Virginia) =

Stream in West Virginia, U.S.

Coordinates: 39°42′27″N 80°33′39″W

Knob Fork is a stream in the U.S. state of West Virginia.

Knob Fork heads at a type of summit called a knob, hence the name.

== See also ==
- List of rivers of West Virginia
