= 1968 United States presidential election in West Virginia =

1968 United States presidential elections in West Virginia
- November 5, 1968
- Turnout: 75.9% (of registered voters); 71.0% (of voting age population)

Nominee	Hubert Humphrey	Richard Nixon	George Wallace
Party	Democratic	Republican	American Independent
Home state	Minnesota	New York (Note: Although he was born in California and he served as a U.S. senator from California, in 1968 Richard Nixon’s official state of residence was New York, because he moved there to practice law after his defeat in the 1962 California gubernatorial election. During his first term as president, Nixon re-established his residency in California. Consequently, most reliable reference books list Nixon's home state as New York in the 1968 election and his home state as California in the 1972 (and 1960) election.)	Alabama
Running mate	Edmund Muskie	Spiro Agnew	S. Marvin Griffin
Electoral vote	7	0	0
Popular vote	374,091	307,555	72,560
Percentage	49.60%	40.78%	9.62%
County results
Humphrey
40–50%
50–60%
60–70%
Nixon
40–50%
50–60%
60–70%
70–80%
President before election
Lyndon B. Johnson
Democratic
Elected President
Richard Nixon
Republican

The 1968 United States presidential election in West Virginia took place on November 5, 1968, as part of the 1968 United States presidential election. West Virginia voters chose seven representatives, or electors, to the Electoral College, who voted for president and vice president.

West Virginia was won by the Democratic candidate, Vice President Hubert Humphrey, with 49.60 percent of the popular vote, against the Republican candidate, former Senator and Vice President Richard Nixon, with 40.78 percent of the popular vote. American Party candidate and former and future Alabama Governor George Wallace also appeared on the ballot, finishing with 9.62 percent of the popular vote.

West Virginia was Wallace's weakest antebellum slave state, whilst it was Humphrey's strongest as it had been for outgoing President Johnson. Wallace fared best in the Eastern Panhandle, urbanised Kanawha County and the emerging Rust Belt of the extreme Northern Panhandle, but even in those areas he did not crack a sixth of the vote in any county.

Strong unionisation meant that the state's predominant poverty-stricken white population did not turn to Wallace in significant numbers. The state's relative loyalty to Humphrey was enhanced by its deep ties to the New Deal and the resultant unionisation, as in all of Appalachian coal country between the 1930s and 1990s. This was helped by the fact that Johnson focused on this state, alongside Texas and culturally allied Kentucky, as critical for Humphrey's hope of regaining the White House. Humphrey nonetheless did lose eighteen percent on Johnson's record performance from 1964.

== Results ==
1968 United States presidential election in West Virginia
Party	Candidate	Votes	%
Democratic	Hubert Humphrey	374,091	49.60%
Republican	Richard Nixon	307,555	40.78%
American	George Wallace	72,560	9.62%
Total votes		754,206	100.00%

=== Results by county ===
County	Hubert Humphrey Democratic		Richard Nixon Republican		George Wallace American		Margin		Total votes cast
County	#	%	#	%	#	%	#	%	Total votes cast
Barbour	3,210	47.34%	3,206	47.28%	365	5.38%	4	0.06%	6,781
Berkeley	4,929	34.06%	7,223	49.91%	2,321	16.04%	-2,294	-15.85%	14,473
Boone	6,391	62.13%	2,970	28.87%	926	9.00%	3,421	33.26%	10,287
Braxton	3,268	54.02%	2,441	40.35%	341	5.64%	827	13.67%	6,050
Brooke	7,506	57.12%	4,191	31.89%	1,444	10.99%	3,315	25.23%	13,141
Cabell	19,018	44.12%	19,418	45.05%	4,666	10.83%	-400	-0.93%	43,102
Calhoun	1,682	46.57%	1,612	44.63%	318	8.80%	70	1.94%	3,612
Clay	1,916	51.24%	1,474	39.42%	349	9.33%	442	11.82%	3,739
Doddridge	844	29.60%	1,861	65.28%	146	5.12%	-1,017	-35.68%	2,851
Fayette	14,546	66.96%	5,246	24.15%	1,931	8.89%	9,300	42.81%	21,723
Gilmer	1,582	49.48%	1,401	43.82%	214	6.69%	181	5.66%	3,197
Grant	786	19.76%	2,936	73.81%	256	6.44%	-2,150	-54.05%	3,978
Greenbrier	6,318	46.46%	5,559	40.88%	1,722	12.66%	759	5.58%	13,599
Hampshire	1,791	40.30%	1,959	44.08%	694	15.62%	-168	-3.78%	4,444
Hancock	10,174	54.03%	6,181	32.82%	2,476	13.15%	3,993	21.21%	18,831
Hardy	1,767	43.90%	1,768	43.93%	490	12.17%	-1	-0.03%	4,025
Harrison	18,872	54.22%	13,703	39.37%	2,234	6.42%	5,169	14.85%	34,809
Jackson	3,462	36.13%	5,173	53.99%	947	9.88%	-1,711	-17.86%	9,582
Jefferson	3,129	45.16%	2,718	39.23%	1,082	15.62%	411	5.93%	6,929
Kanawha	46,650	46.70%	41,712	41.76%	11,524	11.54%	4,938	4.94%	99,886
Lewis	3,168	40.43%	4,027	51.40%	640	8.17%	-859	-10.97%	7,835
Lincoln	4,386	50.82%	3,662	42.43%	583	6.75%	724	8.39%	8,631
Logan	13,686	67.42%	4,754	23.42%	1,861	9.17%	8,932	44.00%	20,301
Marion	17,246	58.94%	10,177	34.78%	1,838	6.28%	7,069	24.16%	29,261
Marshall	8,449	49.47%	7,252	42.46%	1,379	8.07%	1,197	7.01%	17,080
Mason	4,549	42.77%	5,208	48.97%	879	8.26%	-659	-6.20%	10,636
McDowell	12,842	67.81%	4,020	21.23%	2,075	10.96%	8,822	46.58%	18,937
Mercer	12,739	48.83%	9,985	38.28%	3,363	12.89%	2,754	10.55%	26,087
Mineral	4,225	42.07%	4,545	45.26%	1,273	12.68%	-320	-3.19%	10,043
Mingo	8,677	62.89%	3,988	28.90%	1,133	8.21%	4,689	33.99%	13,798
Monongalia	13,128	54.83%	9,261	38.68%	1,556	6.50%	3,867	16.15%	23,945
Monroe	2,412	40.95%	2,925	49.66%	553	9.39%	-513	-8.71%	5,890
Morgan	1,015	27.28%	2,244	60.32%	461	12.39%	-1,229	-33.04%	3,720
Nicholas	4,858	51.81%	3,678	39.22%	841	8.97%	1,180	12.59%	9,377
Ohio	15,026	49.65%	13,073	43.20%	2,164	7.15%	1,953	6.45%	30,263
Pendleton	1,643	45.29%	1,687	46.50%	298	8.21%	-44	-1.21%	3,628
Pleasants	1,522	46.69%	1,534	47.06%	204	6.26%	-12	-0.37%	3,260
Pocahontas	1,948	43.93%	2,040	46.01%	446	10.06%	-92	-2.08%	4,434
Preston	4,020	39.35%	5,636	55.16%	561	5.49%	-1,616	-15.81%	10,217
Putnam	5,009	43.18%	5,252	45.27%	1,340	11.55%	-243	-2.09%	11,601
Raleigh	17,744	60.14%	8,775	29.74%	2,987	10.12%	8,969	30.40%	29,506
Randolph	5,562	50.72%	4,508	41.11%	897	8.18%	1,054	9.61%	10,967
Ritchie	1,281	27.42%	3,106	66.50%	284	6.08%	-1,825	-39.08%	4,671
Roane	2,639	38.17%	3,851	55.70%	424	6.13%	-1,212	-17.53%	6,914
Summers	3,521	52.75%	2,305	34.53%	849	12.72%	1,216	18.22%	6,675
Taylor	2,953	45.92%	3,012	46.84%	466	7.25%	-59	-0.92%	6,431
Tucker	1,758	48.82%	1,511	41.96%	332	9.22%	247	6.86%	3,601
Tyler	1,324	29.20%	2,897	63.90%	313	6.90%	-1,573	-34.70%	4,534
Upshur	2,319	31.72%	4,565	62.44%	427	5.84%	-2,246	-30.72%	7,311
Wayne	8,227	50.41%	6,004	36.79%	2,088	12.79%	2,223	13.62%	16,319
Webster	2,582	62.87%	1,241	30.22%	284	6.92%	1,341	32.65%	4,107
Wetzel	4,038	45.12%	4,122	46.06%	789	8.82%	-84	-0.94%	8,949
Wirt	820	40.78%	1,051	52.26%	140	6.96%	-231	-11.48%	2,011
Wood	14,293	39.02%	18,960	51.76%	3,379	9.22%	-4,667	-12.74%	36,632
Wyoming	6,641	57.27%	3,947	34.04%	1,007	8.68%	2,694	23.23%	11,595
Totals	374,091	49.60%	307,555	40.78%	72,560	9.62%	66,536	8.82%	754,206

==== Counties that flipped from Democratic to Republican ====
- Berkeley
- Cabell
- Doddridge
- Hampshire
- Hardy
- Jackson
- Lewis
- Mineral
- Mason
- Monroe
- Pendleton
- Pleasants
- Pocahontas
- Preston
- Putnam
- Roane
- Taylor
- Upshur
- Wetzel
- Wood
- Wirt
