= 1956 United States presidential election in West Virginia =

- November 6, 1956

All 8 West Virginia votes to the Electoral College
- Turnout: 75.02%

Nominee	Dwight D. Eisenhower	Adlai Stevenson
Party	Republican	Democratic
Home state	Pennsylvania (Note: Although he was born in Texas and grew up in Kansas before his military career, at the time of the 1952 election Eisenhower was president of Columbia University and was, officially, a resident of New York. During his first term as president, he moved his private residence to Gettysburg, Pennsylvania, and officially changed his residency to Pennsylvania.)	Illinois
Running mate	Richard Nixon	Estes Kefauver
Electoral vote	8	0
Popular vote	449,297	381,534
Percentage	54.08%	45.92%
County results
Eisenhower
50–60%
60–70%
70–80%
80–90%
Stevenson
50–60%
60–70%
President before election
Dwight D. Eisenhower
Republican
Elected President
Dwight D. Eisenhower
Republican

The 1956 United States presidential election in West Virginia took place on November 6, 1956, as part of the 1956 United States presidential election. West Virginia voters chose eight representatives, or electors, to the Electoral College, who voted for president and vice president.

West Virginia was won by incumbent President Dwight D. Eisenhower (R–Pennsylvania), running with Vice President Richard Nixon, with 54.08 percent of the popular vote, against Adlai Stevenson (D–Illinois), running with Senator Estes Kefauver, with 45.92 percent of the popular vote. Along with Kentucky and Louisiana, West Virginia was one of three states that Dwight Eisenhower lost in 1952, but managed to flip in 1956. This was the only time between 1928 and 2000 in which West Virginia voted for a Republican presidential candidate outside a 49-state landslide.

== Results ==
1956 United States presidential election in West Virginia
Party	Candidate	Votes	%
Republican	Dwight D. Eisenhower (inc.)	449,297	54.08%
Democratic	Adlai Stevenson	381,534	45.92%
Total votes		830,831	100.00%

=== Results by county ===
County	Dwight D. Eisenhower Republican		Adlai Stevenson Democratic		Margin		Total votes cast
County	#	%	#	%	#	%	Total votes cast
Barbour	4,460	54.61%	3,707	45.39%	753	9.22%	8,167
Berkeley	9,071	61.62%	5,649	38.38%	3,422	23.24%	14,720
Boone	5,196	42.17%	7,126	57.83%	-1,930	-15.66%	12,322
Braxton	3,441	46.79%	3,913	53.21%	-472	-6.42%	7,354
Brooke	5,944	45.67%	7,072	54.33%	-1,128	-8.66%	13,016
Cabell	28,882	61.07%	18,408	38.93%	10,474	22.14%	47,290
Calhoun	2,094	52.06%	1,928	47.94%	166	4.12%	4,022
Clay	2,820	51.76%	2,628	48.24%	192	3.52%	5,448
Doddridge	2,594	73.51%	935	26.49%	1,659	47.02%	3,529
Fayette	10,218	38.55%	16,286	61.45%	-6,068	-22.90%	26,504
Gilmer	1,774	46.81%	2,016	53.19%	-242	-6.38%	3,790
Grant	3,408	84.31%	634	15.69%	2,774	68.62%	4,042
Greenbrier	7,684	52.99%	6,817	47.01%	867	5.98%	14,501
Hampshire	2,676	53.18%	2,356	46.82%	320	6.36%	5,032
Hancock	8,750	47.88%	9,524	52.12%	-774	-4.24%	18,274
Hardy	2,202	49.36%	2,259	50.64%	-57	-1.28%	4,461
Harrison	21,860	55.48%	17,541	44.52%	4,319	10.96%	39,401
Jackson	4,984	65.75%	2,596	34.25%	2,388	31.50%	7,580
Jefferson	3,380	50.20%	3,353	49.80%	27	0.40%	6,733
Kanawha	58,597	53.81%	50,289	46.19%	8,308	7.62%	108,886
Lewis	6,203	66.01%	3,194	33.99%	3,009	32.02%	9,397
Lincoln	4,954	49.91%	4,972	50.09%	-18	-0.18%	9,926
Logan	10,588	41.71%	14,794	58.29%	-4,206	-16.58%	25,382
Marion	16,112	49.88%	16,192	50.12%	-80	-0.24%	32,304
Marshall	10,223	57.80%	7,463	42.20%	2,760	15.60%	17,686
Mason	6,306	62.59%	3,769	37.41%	2,537	25.18%	10,075
McDowell	11,138	39.77%	16,865	60.23%	-5,727	-20.46%	28,003
Mercer	14,648	52.53%	13,236	47.47%	1,412	5.06%	27,884
Mineral	6,412	64.12%	3,588	35.88%	2,824	28.24%	10,000
Mingo	7,916	44.15%	10,014	55.85%	-2,098	-11.70%	17,930
Monongalia	14,046	56.05%	11,016	43.95%	3,030	12.10%	25,062
Monroe	3,529	56.01%	2,772	43.99%	757	12.02%	6,301
Morgan	2,946	72.74%	1,104	27.26%	1,842	45.48%	4,050
Nicholas	5,263	51.89%	4,880	48.11%	383	3.78%	10,143
Ohio	22,165	62.69%	13,191	37.31%	8,974	25.38%	35,356
Pendleton	1,959	49.49%	1,999	50.51%	-40	-1.02%	3,958
Pleasants	2,144	57.56%	1,581	42.44%	563	15.12%	3,725
Pocahontas	2,937	53.69%	2,533	46.31%	404	7.38%	5,470
Preston	7,953	70.27%	3,365	29.73%	4,588	40.54%	11,318
Putnam	5,560	53.91%	4,754	46.09%	806	7.82%	10,314
Raleigh	16,318	50.08%	16,264	49.92%	54	0.16%	32,582
Randolph	5,448	48.88%	5,697	51.12%	-249	-2.24%	11,145
Ritchie	4,140	73.78%	1,471	26.22%	2,669	47.56%	5,611
Roane	4,701	59.85%	3,153	40.15%	1,548	19.70%	7,854
Summers	3,712	48.99%	3,865	51.01%	-153	-2.02%	7,577
Taylor	4,743	60.64%	3,079	39.36%	1,664	21.28%	7,822
Tucker	2,326	52.21%	2,129	47.79%	197	4.42%	4,455
Tyler	3,671	73.58%	1,318	26.42%	2,353	47.16%	4,989
Upshur	5,707	73.28%	2,081	26.72%	3,626	46.56%	7,788
Wayne	8,429	52.41%	7,655	47.59%	774	4.82%	16,084
Webster	2,457	44.44%	3,072	55.56%	-615	-11.12%	5,529
Wetzel	5,024	56.88%	3,809	43.12%	1,215	13.76%	8,833
Wirt	1,444	54.95%	1,184	45.05%	260	9.90%	2,628
Wood	21,096	61.30%	13,320	38.70%	7,776	22.60%	34,416
Wyoming	7,044	49.74%	7,118	50.26%	-74	-0.52%	14,162
Totals	449,297	54.08%	381,534	45.92%	67,763	8.16%	830,831

==== Counties that flipped from Democratic to Republican ====
- Calhoun
- Clay
- Greenbrier
- Hampshire
- Jefferson
- Mercer
- Monongalia
- Nicholas
- Raleigh
- Tucker
- Wayne
