= 1972 United States presidential election in West Virginia =

- November 7, 1972
- Turnout: 72.8% (of registered voters); 63.5% (of voting age population)

Nominee	Richard Nixon	George McGovern
Party	Republican	Democratic
Home state	California	South Dakota
Running mate	Spiro Agnew	Sargent Shriver
Electoral vote	6	0
Popular vote	484,964	277,435
Percentage	63.61%	36.39%
County results
Nixon
50–60%
60–70%
70–80%
80–90%
McGovern
50–60%
President before election
Richard Nixon
Republican
Elected President
Richard Nixon
Republican

The 1972 United States presidential election in West Virginia took place on November 7, 1972, as part of the 1972 United States presidential election. West Virginia voters chose six representatives, or electors, to the Electoral College, who voted for president and vice president.

West Virginia was won by incumbent President Richard Nixon (R–California), with 63.61 percent of the popular vote, against George McGovern (D–South Dakota), with 36.39 percent of the popular vote. Nixon won every county in the state except for Logan County, which McGovern won by 2.62 percentage points.

In this socially conservative state, McGovern was largely portrayed as a left-wing extremist due to his support for busing and civil rights, alongside fears that McGovern would legalize abortion and illicit drugs if elected — despite the fact that his running mate (after Senator Thomas Eagleton was dropped from the ticket) Sargent Shriver was firmly opposed to abortion being legal. This was the only time West Virginia voted more Republican than the national popular vote between 1936 and 1996, and the only time between 1936 and 2008 that McDowell County voted for the Republican candidate.

== Results ==
1972 United States presidential election in West Virginia
Party	Candidate	Votes	%
Republican	Richard Nixon (inc.)	484,964	63.61%
Democratic	George McGovern	277,435	36.39%
Total votes		762,399	100.00%

=== Results by county ===
County	Richard Nixon Republican		George McGovern Democratic		Margin		Total votes cast
County	#	%	#	%	#	%	Total votes cast
Barbour	4,432	66.25%	2,258	33.75%	2,174	32.50%	6,690
Berkeley	10,954	70.78%	4,523	29.22%	6,431	41.56%	15,477
Boone	5,985	52.84%	5,342	47.16%	643	5.68%	11,327
Braxton	3,155	53.24%	2,771	46.76%	384	6.48%	5,926
Brooke	7,544	59.08%	5,226	40.92%	2,318	18.16%	12,770
Cabell	29,582	67.39%	14,312	32.61%	15,270	34.78%	43,894
Calhoun	1,992	56.59%	1,528	43.41%	464	13.18%	3,520
Clay	2,168	54.23%	1,830	45.77%	338	8.46%	3,998
Doddridge	2,284	77.98%	645	22.02%	1,639	55.96%	2,929
Fayette	11,876	54.37%	9,966	45.63%	1,910	8.74%	21,842
Gilmer	2,056	60.20%	1,359	39.80%	697	20.40%	3,415
Grant	3,556	85.28%	614	14.72%	2,942	70.56%	4,170
Greenbrier	8,827	66.62%	4,423	33.38%	4,404	33.24%	13,250
Hampshire	3,084	65.33%	1,637	34.67%	1,447	30.66%	4,721
Hancock	10,634	61.25%	6,727	38.75%	3,907	22.50%	17,361
Hardy	2,609	63.34%	1,510	36.66%	1,099	26.68%	4,119
Harrison	22,196	63.23%	12,910	36.77%	9,286	26.46%	35,106
Jackson	7,226	70.61%	3,007	29.39%	4,219	41.22%	10,233
Jefferson	4,822	63.41%	2,782	36.59%	2,040	26.82%	7,604
Kanawha	65,021	63.09%	38,032	36.91%	26,989	26.18%	103,053
Lewis	5,778	73.70%	2,062	26.30%	3,716	47.40%	7,840
Lincoln	4,673	54.66%	3,876	45.34%	797	9.32%	8,549
Logan	9,533	48.69%	10,045	51.31%	-512	-2.62%	19,578
Marion	16,095	57.57%	11,864	42.43%	4,231	15.14%	27,959
Marshall	10,966	63.23%	6,378	36.77%	4,588	26.46%	17,344
Mason	7,129	64.01%	4,008	35.99%	3,121	28.02%	11,137
McDowell	8,942	56.76%	6,811	43.24%	2,131	13.52%	15,753
Mercer	17,846	69.52%	7,826	30.48%	10,020	39.04%	25,672
Mineral	7,157	68.60%	3,276	31.40%	3,881	37.20%	10,433
Mingo	7,484	57.27%	5,585	42.73%	1,899	14.54%	13,069
Monongalia	16,758	60.98%	10,721	39.02%	6,037	21.96%	27,479
Monroe	3,716	63.74%	2,114	36.26%	1,602	27.48%	5,830
Morgan	3,014	72.94%	1,118	27.06%	1,896	45.88%	4,132
Nicholas	5,907	61.95%	3,628	38.05%	2,279	23.90%	9,535
Ohio	18,435	63.73%	10,491	36.27%	7,944	27.46%	28,926
Pendleton	2,207	63.88%	1,248	36.12%	959	27.76%	3,455
Pleasants	2,025	62.65%	1,207	37.35%	818	25.30%	3,232
Pocahontas	2,391	59.39%	1,635	40.61%	756	18.78%	4,026
Preston	7,807	72.39%	2,977	27.61%	4,830	44.78%	10,784
Putnam	8,265	63.40%	4,771	36.60%	3,494	26.80%	13,036
Raleigh	19,150	64.40%	10,586	35.60%	8,564	28.80%	29,736
Randolph	6,923	64.51%	3,809	35.49%	3,114	29.02%	10,732
Ritchie	3,635	78.59%	990	21.41%	2,645	57.18%	4,625
Roane	4,253	64.06%	2,386	35.94%	1,867	28.12%	6,639
Summers	3,895	60.74%	2,518	39.26%	1,377	21.48%	6,413
Taylor	4,385	67.77%	2,085	32.23%	2,300	35.54%	6,470
Tucker	2,163	59.75%	1,457	40.25%	706	19.50%	3,620
Tyler	3,362	74.93%	1,125	25.07%	2,237	49.86%	4,487
Upshur	6,449	78.23%	1,795	21.77%	4,654	56.46%	8,244
Wayne	9,775	60.99%	6,251	39.01%	3,524	21.98%	16,026
Webster	2,114	50.54%	2,069	49.46%	45	1.08%	4,183
Wetzel	6,046	64.86%	3,276	35.14%	2,770	29.72%	9,322
Wirt	1,442	67.60%	691	32.40%	751	35.20%	2,133
Wood	27,315	71.50%	10,886	28.50%	16,429	43.00%	38,201
Wyoming	7,926	63.95%	4,468	36.05%	3,458	27.90%	12,394
Totals	484,964	63.61%	277,435	36.39%	207,529	27.22%	762,399
