= Wetzel County, West Virginia =

County in West Virginia, United States

- County
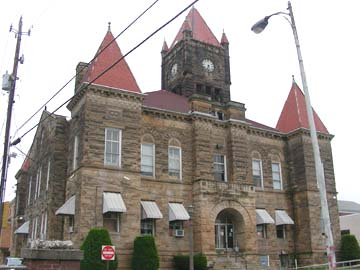
- Wetzel County Courthouse

- Seal

- Location within the U.S. state of West Virginia
- Coordinates: 39°37′N 80°38′W
- Country: United States
- State: West Virginia
- Founded: January 10, 1846
- Named for: Lewis Wetzel
- Seat: New Martinsville
- Largest city: New Martinsville

Area
  - Total: 361 sq mi (930 km^{2})
  - Land: 358 sq mi (930 km^{2})
  - Water: 3.3 sq mi (8.5 km^{2}) 0.9%

Population (2020)
  - Total: 14,442
  - Estimate (2025): 13,734 ▼
  - Density: 40.3/sq mi (15.6/km^{2})
- Time zone: UTC−5 (Eastern)
  - Summer (DST): UTC−4 (EDT)
- Congressional district: 1st
- Website: www.wetzelcountywv.gov

Wetzel County is a county in the U.S. state of West Virginia. As of the 2020 census, the population was 14,442. Its county seat is New Martinsville. The county, founded in 1846, is named for Lewis Wetzel, a famous frontiersman and Indian fighter. Its northern border aligns with the Mason–Dixon line, but is to the west of the line's western terminus.

== History ==
Wetzel County was formed in 1846 from part of Tyler County, Virginia. On June 20, 1863, at the height of the Civil War, Wetzel was one of fifty Virginia counties admitted to the Union as the state of West Virginia.

Later that year, West Virginia's counties were divided into civil townships, with the intention of encouraging local government. This proved impractical in the heavily rural state, and in 1872 the townships were converted into magisterial districts. Wetzel County was divided into six districts: Center, (Note: Initially spelled "Centre".) Church, Grant, Green, Magnolia, and Proctor. A seventh district, Clay, was formed in the 1880s. New Martinsville, the county seat, was in Magnolia District. Except for minor adjustments, the seven historic magisterial districts remained largely unchanged for a century, until the 1980s, when they were consolidated into three new districts: District 1, District 2, and District 3.

== Geography ==
According to the United States Census Bureau, the county has a total area of 361 square miles (930 km^{2}), of which 358 square miles (930 km^{2}) is land and 3.3 square miles (8.5 km^{2}) (0.9%) is water.

=== Major highways ===
- US 250
- WV 2
- WV 7
- WV 20
- WV 69
- WV 180

=== Adjacent counties ===
- Marshall County (north)
- Greene County, Pennsylvania (northeast)
- Monongalia County (east)
- Marion County (east)
- Harrison County (southeast)
- Doddridge County (south)
- Tyler County (southwest)
- Monroe County, Ohio (west)

=== National protected area ===
- Ohio River Islands National Wildlife Refuge (part)

== Demographics ==
Historical population
Census	Pop.	Note	%±
1850	4,284		—
1860	6,703		56.5%
1870	8,595		28.2%
1880	13,896		61.7%
1890	16,841		21.2%
1900	22,880		35.9%
1910	23,855		4.3%
1920	23,069		−3.3%
1930	22,334		−3.2%
1940	22,342		0.0%
1950	20,154		−9.8%
1960	19,347		−4.0%
1970	20,314		5.0%
1980	21,874		7.7%
1990	19,258		−12.0%
2000	17,693		−8.1%
2010	16,583		−6.3%
2020	14,442		−12.9%
2025 (est.)	13,734	▼	−4.9%
U.S. Decennial Census; 1790–1960 1900–1990; 1990–2000 2010–2020

=== 2020 census ===
As of the 2020 census, the county had a population of 14,442. Of the residents, 19.4% were under the age of 18 and 23.7% were 65 years of age or older; the median age was 47.0 years. For every 100 females there were 98.4 males, and for every 100 females age 18 and over there were 96.5 males.

The racial makeup of the county was 95.2% White, 0.2% Black or African American, 0.1% American Indian and Alaska Native, 0.3% Asian, 0.3% from some other race, and 3.7% from two or more races. Hispanic or Latino residents of any race comprised 1.0% of the population.

There were 6,229 households in the county, of which 25.1% had children under the age of 18 living with them and 26.4% had a female householder with no spouse or partner present. About 31.2% of all households were made up of individuals and 15.7% had someone living alone who was 65 years of age or older.

There were 7,254 housing units, of which 14.1% were vacant. Among occupied housing units, 77.1% were owner-occupied and 22.9% were renter-occupied. The homeowner vacancy rate was 1.3% and the rental vacancy rate was 14.6%.

Wetzel County, West Virginia – Racial and ethnic composition Note: the US Census treats Hispanic/Latino as an ethnic category. This table excludes Latinos from the racial categories and assigns them to a separate category. Hispanics/Latinos may be of any race.
Race / Ethnicity (NH = Non-Hispanic)	Pop 2000	Pop 2010	Pop 2020	% 2000	% 2010	% 2020
White alone (NH)	17,439	16,319	13,704	98.56%	98.41%	94.89%
Black or African American alone (NH)	15	24	34	0.08%	0.14%	0.24%
Native American or Alaska Native alone (NH)	17	12	18	0.10%	0.07%	0.12%
Asian alone (NH)	57	40	50	0.32%	0.24%	0.35%
Pacific Islander alone (NH)	4	1	0	0.02%	0.01%	0.00%
Other race alone (NH)	2	3	11	0.01%	0.02%	0.08%
Mixed race or Multiracial (NH)	85	101	477	0.48%	0.61%	3.30%
Hispanic or Latino (any race)	74	83	148	0.42%	0.50%	1.02%
Total	17,693	16,583	14,442	100.00%	100.00%	100.00%

=== 2010 census ===
As of the 2010 United States census, there were 16,583 people, 6,968 households, and 4,768 families living in the county. The population density was 46.3 inhabitants per square mile (17.9/km^{2}). There were 8,173 housing units at an average density of 22.8 units per square mile (8.8 units/km^{2}). The racial makeup of the county was 98.7% white, 0.2% Asian, 0.1% American Indian, 0.1% black or African American, 0.2% from other races, and 0.6% from two or more races. Those of Hispanic or Latino origin made up 0.5% of the population. In terms of ancestry, 27.5% were German, 16.0% were Irish, 12.8% were American, and 12.4% were English.

Of the 6,968 households, 28.1% had children under the age of 18 living with them, 53.4% were married couples living together, 10.4% had a female householder with no husband present, 31.6% were non-families, and 27.4% of all households were made up of individuals. The average household size was 2.36 and the average family size was 2.83. The median age was 44.8 years.

The median income for a household in the county was $36,636 and the median income for a family was $48,523. Males had a median income of $45,833 versus $25,033 for females. The per capita income for the county was $19,899. About 13.1% of families and 17.5% of the population were below the poverty line, including 26.5% of those under age 18 and 13.7% of those age 65 or over.

=== 2000 census ===
As of the census of 2000, there were 17,693 people, 7,164 households, and 5,079 families living in the county. The population density was 49 people per square mile (19 people/km^{2}). There were 8,313 housing units at an average density of 23 units per square mile (8.9 units/km^{2}). The racial makeup of the county was 98.92% White, 0.08% Black or African American, 0.10% Native American, 0.32% Asian, 0.02% Pacific Islander, 0.03% from other races, and 0.53% from two or more races. 0.42% of the population were Hispanic or Latino of any race.

There were 7,164 households, out of which 30.20% had children under the age of 18 living with them, 57.70% were married couples living together, 9.30% had a female householder with no husband present, and 29.10% were non-families. 25.70% of all households were made up of individuals, and 12.80% had someone living alone who was 65 years of age or older. The average household size was 2.45 and the average family size was 2.92.

In the county, the population was spread out, with 23.80% under the age of 18, 6.80% from 18 to 24, 26.50% from 25 to 44, 26.80% from 45 to 64, and 16.20% who were 65 years of age or older. The median age was 40 years. For every 100 females there were 94.30 males. For every 100 females age 18 and over, there were 91.20 males.

The median income for a household in the county was $30,935, and the median income for a family was $36,793. Males had a median income of $37,296 versus $19,339 for females. The per capita income for the county was $16,818. About 15.30% of families and 19.80% of the population were below the poverty line, including 26.60% of those under age 18 and 15.20% of those age 65 or over.

== Politics ==
Wetzel County was a rarity among northern West Virginia counties in supporting secession at the Virginia Secession Convention, and it reliably supported Democratic presidential candidates for the next ninety years. The first Republican to carry Wetzel County was Herbert Hoover in 1928 due to anti-Catholicism, but the county afterwards stayed Democratic until 1952. Since that time Wetzel County has followed the politics of West Virginia: a Democratic-leaning state up to the Clinton Era, after which the Democratic Party's consistent shift to social-liberal positions and support of green policies – an antithesis to the region's traditional economy – have caused Wetzel County to trend rapidly toward the Republican Party.

United States presidential election results for Wetzel County, West Virginia
Year	Republican		Democratic		Third party(ies)	
Year	No.	%	No.	%	No.	%
1912	1,092	23.24%	2,710	57.68%	896	19.07%
1916	1,910	39.92%	2,797	58.47%	77	1.61%
1920	3,619	46.37%	4,103	52.58%	82	1.05%
1924	3,458	39.60%	4,998	57.24%	276	3.16%
1928	4,428	51.86%	4,052	47.45%	59	0.69%
1932	3,351	35.10%	6,118	64.08%	78	0.82%
1936	3,770	36.74%	6,463	62.98%	29	0.28%
1940	4,443	44.28%	5,590	55.72%	0	0.00%
1944	3,604	45.40%	4,335	54.60%	0	0.00%
1948	3,326	42.48%	4,477	57.18%	26	0.33%
1952	4,476	50.57%	4,375	49.43%	0	0.00%
1956	5,024	56.88%	3,809	43.12%	0	0.00%
1960	5,149	54.27%	4,338	45.73%	0	0.00%
1964	3,215	34.01%	6,239	65.99%	0	0.00%
1968	4,122	46.06%	4,038	45.12%	789	8.82%
1972	6,046	64.86%	3,276	35.14%	0	0.00%
1976	3,793	42.93%	5,042	57.07%	0	0.00%
1980	3,588	44.77%	4,035	50.34%	392	4.89%
1984	4,626	56.37%	3,549	43.24%	32	0.39%
1988	3,381	46.00%	3,928	53.44%	41	0.56%
1992	2,271	29.89%	3,753	49.40%	1,573	20.71%
1996	2,037	32.45%	3,209	51.12%	1,031	16.43%
2000	3,239	51.51%	2,849	45.31%	200	3.18%
2004	3,656	51.95%	3,330	47.31%	52	0.74%
2008	3,342	51.78%	2,942	45.58%	170	2.63%
2012	3,473	59.11%	2,217	37.74%	185	3.15%
2016	4,519	71.59%	1,359	21.53%	434	6.88%
2020	4,993	74.87%	1,539	23.08%	137	2.05%
2024	4,718	76.49%	1,294	20.98%	156	2.53%

== Local lore ==
In the mid-to-late 19th century a band similar to the James Gang of legend existed that was known as the Jennings Gang. A number of robberies and murders were accounted to this gang. They were known to be located near the head of Doolin Run near Tarpan Ridge. The home they occupied was found to have an escape tunnel that had been used to escape capture on several occasions. A local group of citizens known as the "Redmen" ultimately cornered the gang at this home and a number of the members were killed. A detailed description exists in the Wetzel County History written approximately in 1900.

The oldest oil well location known is of one drilled on Long Run near Doolin Run which reached oil at a depth about 360 ft.

Wetzel County has a long history in the Oil and Gas producing industry. During the Oil boom of the 19th century it is reported that the Proctor Creek watershed had 12 saloons and numerous livery/hotels to accommodate the hundreds of logging and oil field workers.

== Communities ==
=== Cities ===
- New Martinsville (county seat)
- Paden City (part)

=== Towns ===
- Hundred
- Pine Grove
- Smithfield

=== Magisterial districts ===
==== Current ====
- District 1
- District 2
- District 3

==== Historic ====
- Center
- Church
- Clay
- Grant
- Green
- Magnolia
- Proctor

=== Census-designated places ===
- Jacksonburg
- Littleton
- Reader

=== Unincorporated communities ===
- Bebee
- Big Run
- Burton
- Coburn
- Earnshaw
- Folsom
- Hastings
- Knob Fork
- Maud
- Porters Falls
- Proctor
- Rockport
- Silver Hill
- Wheat
- Wileyville

== See also ==
- Wetzel County Schools
- Cecil H. Underwood Wildlife Management Area
- Harker Run
- Lewis Wetzel Wildlife Management Area
- National Register of Historic Places listings in Wetzel County, West Virginia
