= National Register of Historic Places listings in Ritchie County, West Virginia =

Location of Ritchie County in West Virginia

This is a list of the National Register of Historic Places listings in Ritchie County, West Virginia.

This is intended to be a complete list of the properties and districts on the National Register of Historic Places in Ritchie County, West Virginia, United States. The locations of National Register properties and districts for which the latitude and longitude coordinates are included below, may be seen in a Google map.

There are 6 properties and districts listed on the National Register in the county.

This National Park Service list is complete through NPS recent listings posted March 21, 2025.

Contents: Counties in West Virginia

Barbour - Berkeley - Boone - Braxton - Brooke - Cabell - Calhoun - Clay - Doddridge - Fayette - Gilmer - Grant - Greenbrier - Hampshire - Hancock - Hardy - Harrison - Jackson - Jefferson - Kanawha - Lewis - Lincoln - Logan - Marion - Marshall - Mason - McDowell - Mercer - Mineral - Mingo - Monongalia - Monroe - Morgan - Nicholas - Ohio - Pendleton - Pleasants - Pocahontas - Preston - Putnam - Raleigh - Randolph - Ritchie - Roane - Summers - Taylor - Tucker - Tyler - Upshur - Wayne - Webster - Wetzel - Wirt - Wood - Wyoming

== Current listings ==
| | Name on the Register | Image | Date listed | Location | City or town | Description |
|---|---|---|---|---|---|---|
| 1 | Bank of Cairo | Bank of Cairo | September 19, 1996 (#96000986) | Junction of Main St. and former Baltimore & Ohio railroad line 39°12′29″N 81°09′24″W | Cairo | |
| 2 | Harrisville Grade School | Harrisville Grade School | January 9, 1997 (#96001570) | 217 W. Main St. 39°12′34″N 81°03′14″W | Harrisville | |
| 3 | Harrisville Historic District | Harrisville Historic District | August 18, 2011 (#11000558) | Roughly bounded by North, South, and Stout Sts., and Moats Ave. 39°12′36″N 81°03′11″W | Harrisville | |
| 4 | Old Stone House | Old Stone House | July 21, 1978 (#78002811) | 310 W. Myles Ave. 39°17′05″N 80°58′19″W | Pennsboro | |
| 5 | Pennsboro B&O Depot | Pennsboro B&O Depot | March 27, 2007 (#07000242) | corner of Broadway St. and Collins Ave. 39°17′06″N 80°58′07″W | Pennsboro | |
| 6 | Ritchie County Courthouse | Ritchie County Courthouse | August 25, 2004 (#04000916) | 115 E. Main St. 39°12′36″N 81°03′06″W | Harrisville | |

== See also ==
- List of National Historic Landmarks in West Virginia
- National Register of Historic Places listings in West Virginia
