= Berea, West Virginia =

Unincorporated community in West Virginia, United States

Berea
- Unincorporated community
- Location within the state of West Virginia Berea (the United States)
- Coordinates: 39°8′11″N 80°56′1″W
- Country: United States
- State: West Virginia
- County: Ritchie

Population (2010)
  - Total: 83
- Time zone: UTC-5 (Eastern (EST))
  - Summer (DST): UTC-4 (EDT)
- ZIP codes: 26327

Berea (also Seven-Day Mill or Seventh Day Settlement) is an unincorporated community in southeastern Ritchie County, West Virginia, United States. It lies along West Virginia Route 74, southeast of Harrisville, the county seat of Ritchie County. Its elevation is 751 feet (229 m).

Although it is unincorporated and has no post office, the ZIP code is 26327. Postal customers are serviced by the Harrisville and Auburn post offices.

The community is situated where Otterslide Creek flows into the South Fork Hughes River. It was named after the city of Berea, mentioned in the Bible.
