= Addis Run =

Stream in West Virginia, USA

Addis Run Tributary to North Fork Hughes River
- Location of Addis Run mouth Addis Run (the United States)

Location
- Country: United States
- State: West Virginia
- County: Ritchie

Physical characteristics
- Source: Third Run divide
  - location: about 2 miles southwest of Harrisville, West Virginia
  - coordinates: 39°10′50″N 081°04′57″W
  - elevation: 960 ft (290 m)
- Mouth: North Fork Hughes River
  - location: about 1 mile northeast of Riverside, West Virginia
  - coordinates: 39°11′06″N 081°09′41″W
  - elevation: 663 ft (202 m)
- Length: 4.70 mi (7.56 km)
- Basin size: 4.89 square miles (12.7 km^{2})
- Discharge
  - location: North Fork Hughes River
  - average: 7.03 cu ft/s (0.199 m^{3}/s) at mouth with North Fork Hughes River

Basin features
- Progression: North Fork Hughes River → Hughes River → Little Kanawha River → Ohio River → Mississippi River → Gulf of Mexico
- River system: Ohio River
- Tributaries
  - left: unnamed tributaries
  - right: unnamed tributaries
- Bridges: WV 31, Buttercup Lane, Bias Road, Pew Hill Road, Moneypenny Lane

Addis Run is a tributary stream of the Hughes River in the U.S. state of West Virginia.

Addis Run has the name of a pioneer landowner. This is the only stream of this name in the United States.

== Course ==
Addis Run rises about 2 miles southwest of Harrisville, West Virginia, in Ritchie County and then flows generally west to join North Fork Hughes River about 1 mile northeast of Riverside.

== Watershed ==
Addis Run drains 4.89 square miles (12.7 km^{2}) of area, receives about 44.8 in/year of precipitation, has a wetness index of 258.50, and is about 89% forested.

== See also ==
- List of rivers of West Virginia
