= Bee Run =

Bee Run may refer to:

- Bee Run (Missouri), a stream in Missouri
- Bee Run (Spring Creek), a stream in Miami County, Ohio
- Bee Run (Ritchie County, West Virginia), a stream
