= Gillespie Run =

Stream in West Virginia, U.S.

Coordinates: 39°08′28″N 81°15′33″W

Gillespie Run is a stream in Ritchie County, West Virginia, United States. It is a tributary to North Fork Hughes River.

Gillespie Run was named after Richard Gillespie.

== See also ==
- List of rivers of West Virginia
