= Burnt House, West Virginia =

Unincorporated community in West Virginia, United States

- Unincorporated community
- Location within West Virginia Location within the United States
- Coordinates: 39°02′47″N 80°59′14″W
- Country: United States
- State: West Virginia
- County: Ritchie
- Elevation: 817 ft (249 m)
- Time zone: UTC-5 (Eastern (EST))
  - Summer (DST): UTC-4 (EDT)
- ZIP code: 26336
- Area codes: 304 & 681
- GNIS feature ID: 1554036

Burnt House is an unincorporated community in Ritchie County, West Virginia, United States. Burnt House is located on West Virginia Route 47 and Grass Run, 11.8 miles (19.0 km) south-southeast of Harrisville. The Burnt House Post Office closed 5/23/1986.

The community's name recalls a tavern which burned at the town site circa 1840.
