= South Fork Hughes River =

Stream in West Virginia, USA

South Fork Hughes River Tributary to Hughes River
- Location of South Fork Hughes River mouth South Fork Hughes River (the United States)

Location
- Country: United States
- State: West Virginia
- County: Ritchie; Wirt; Doddridge

Physical characteristics
- Source: Cove Creek divide
  - location: about 2 miles northeast of Grove, West Virginia
  - coordinates: 39°09′46″N 080°44′44″W
  - elevation: 1,060 ft (320 m)
- Mouth: Hughes River
  - location: about 4 miles southwest of Freeport, West Virginia
  - coordinates: 39°07′05″N 081°16′31″W
  - elevation: 614 ft (187 m)
- Length: 55.67 mi (89.59 km)
- Basin size: 250.29 square miles (648.2 km^{2})
- Discharge
  - location: Hughes River
  - average: 343.17 cu ft/s (9.717 m^{3}/s) at mouth with Hughes River

Basin features
- Progression: Hughes River → Little Kanawha River → Ohio River → Mississippi River → Gulf of Mexico
- River system: Ohio River
- Tributaries
  - left: Painter Run, Upper Wizrd Run, Lower Wizard Run, Taylor Drain, Sugar Run, Middle Fork, Otterslide Creek, Bone Creek, Spruce Creek, Grass Run, Leatherbark Creek, Crab Run, Lick Run, Big Cove Run, Dutchman Run, Laurel Run, Bear Run, Big Island Run, Fall Run
  - right: Cain Run, Dry Run, Camp Run, Big Run, Holt Run, Sheep Run, White Oak Creek, Turtle Run, Slab Creek, Smith Run, Jesse Cain Run, Long Run, Lick Run, Lamb Run, Owl Run, Wigner Run, Cedar Run, Indian Creek, McFarlan Creek, Louthers Run, Locust Run
- Bridges: Freedom Road, Haystack Lane, Taylor Drain Road, Joy Cabin Run Road, Zinn Road (x2), Holbrook Road, Otterslide Creek Road, WV 74, Prunty Road (x2), CR-28/1, Dungeon Road, Prunty Road (x2), Hazelgreen Road, Mill Road, WV 47, Freeland Lane, Crab Run, Steel Bridge Drive, Dutchman Road, WV 47, WV 47, WV 53

South Fork Hughes River is a 55.67 mi (89.59 km) long 4th order tributary to Hughes River in Ritchie and Wirt Counties, West Virginia. This is the only stream of this name in the United States.

== Course ==
South Fork Hughes River rises about 2 miles northeast of Grove, West Virginia, and then flows westerly and joins the Hughes River about 4 miles southeast of Freeport.

== Watershed ==
South Fork Hughes River drains 250.29 square miles (648.2 km^{2}) of area, receives about 45.4 in/year of precipitation, has a wetness index of 255.86, and is about 87% forested.

== See also ==
- List of rivers of West Virginia
