= North Bend Lake =

Lake in West Virginia, United States

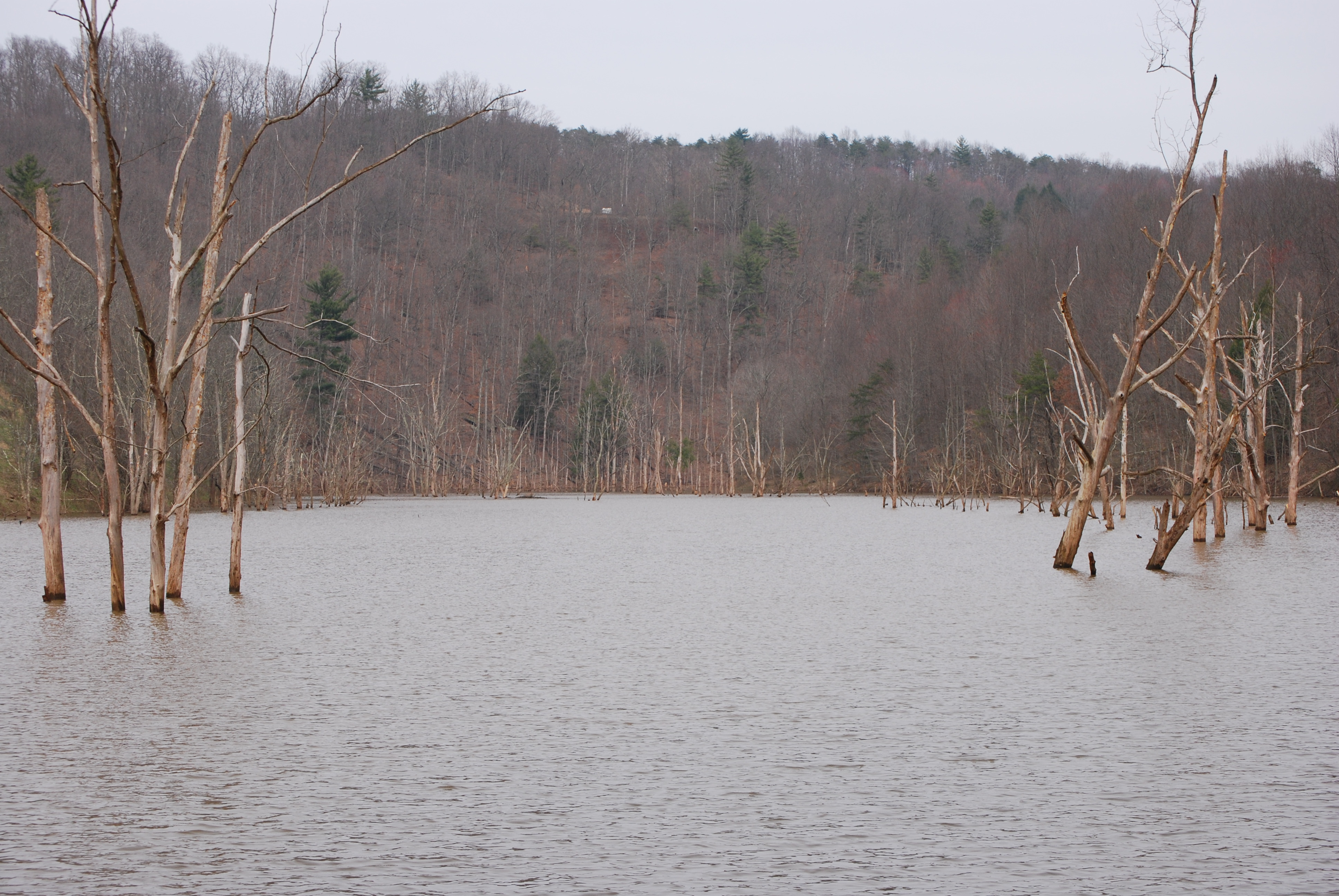
- North Bend Lake in 2008

- Location within West Virginia
- Location: North Bend State Park, Ritchie County, West Virginia
- Coordinates: 39.221382°N 81.083014°W
- Max. length: 8.1 miles (13.0 km)
- Max. width: 310 feet (94 m)
- Surface area: 305 acres (123 ha; 0.477 sq mi)

North Bend Lake is a 305 acres (123 ha; 0.477 sq mi) lake created through the Natural Resources Conservation Service via the Little Kanawha Conservation District. North Bend Lake, located within the North Bend State Park along the North Fork of the Hughes River in Ritchie County near Cairo, West Virginia, is 8.1 miles (13.0 km) in length, and has an average permanent pool width of 310 feet (94 m).
