= Girta, West Virginia =

Unincorporated community in West Virginia, United States

Girta
- Unincorporated community
- Location within the state of West Virginia Girta (the United States)
- Coordinates: 39°6′6″N 81°15′37″W
- Country: United States
- State: West Virginia
- County: Ritchie
- Elevation: 686 ft (209 m)
- Time zone: UTC-5 (Eastern (EST))
  - Summer (DST): UTC-4 (EDT)
- GNIS ID: 1549705

Girta is an unincorporated community in Ritchie County, West Virginia, United States.

The community was named after Girta Nutter, the daughter of an early postmaster.
