= North Fork Hughes River =

Stream in West Virginia, USA

North Fork Hughes River Tributary to Hughes River
- Location of North Fork Hughes River mouth North Fork Hughes River (the United States)

Location
- Country: United States
- State: West Virginia
- County: Ritchie
- City: Cairo

Physical characteristics
- Source: McKim Creek divide
  - location: about 3 miles northwest of Mountain, West Virginia
  - coordinates: 39°23′14″N 080°55′59″W
  - elevation: 1,060 ft (320 m)
- Mouth: Hughes River
  - location: about 4 miles southeast of Freeport, West Virginia
  - coordinates: 39°07′05″N 080°55′59″W
  - elevation: 614 ft (187 m)
- Length: 54.50 mi (87.71 km)
- Basin size: 202.39 square miles (524.2 km^{2})
- Discharge
  - location: Hughes River
  - average: 271.60 cu ft/s (7.691 m^{3}/s) at mouth with Hughes River

Basin features
- Progression: Hughes River → Little Kanawha River → Ohio River → Mississippi River → Gulf of Mexico
- River system: Ohio River
- Tributaries
  - left: Straight Run, Marsh Run, Burton Run, Buck Run, Dotson Run, Cabin Run, Lynncamp Run, Beason Run, Goose Run, Rockcamp Run, Third Run, Low Gap Run, Rusk Run, Addis Run, Elm Run, Devilhole Creek, Little Deveilhole Creek, Gillespie Run
  - right: Lizzies Roost Run, Xddox Run, Poplarlick Run, Gnat Run, Spring Run, Bunnell Run, Cunningham Run, Stewart Run, Lost Run, Bonds Creek, Bear Run, Rocky Run, Big Run, Widlcat Run, Silver Run, Slaughterhouse Run, Sheep Run, Cow Run, Upper Cabin Run, Cabin Run, Hickory Run, Patton Run, Buffalo Run
- Bridges: Creek Bed Road, Jones Road, McCullough Farm Lane, Willow Lane, WV 74, Burton Run Road, Cattle Run Road, Gnats Run, Northwest Turnpike, US 50, Stoney Hollow Road (x3), Lynn Camp Road, Pullman Road, WV 16, Cornwallis Road, WV 31, Water Street, Cisco Road, WV 47

North Fork Hughes River is a 54.50 mi (87.71 km) long 5th order tributary to Hughes River in Ritchie County, West Virginia. This is the only stream of this name in the United States.

== Course ==
North Fork Hughes River rises about 3 miles northwest of Mountain, West Virginia, and then flows southwesterly and joins the Hughes River about 4 miles southeast of Freeport.

== Watershed ==
North Fork Hughes River drains 202.39 square miles (524.2 km^{2}) of area, receives about 44.8 in/year of precipitation, has a wetness index of 267.14, and is about 84% forested.

== See also ==
- List of rivers of West Virginia
