= Pew Hill, West Virginia =

Pew Hill
- Unincorporated community
- Location within the state of West Virginia Pew Hill (the United States)
- Coordinates: 39°10′56″N 81°8′38″W
- Country: United States
- State: West Virginia
- County: Ritchie
- Elevation: 945 ft (288 m)
- Time zone: UTC-5 (Eastern (EST))
  - Summer (DST): UTC-4 (EDT)
- GNIS ID: 1549874

Pew Hill is an unincorporated community in Ritchie County, West Virginia, United States.
