= Crab Run =

Crab Run may refer to:

- Crab Run (Mahanoy Creek), Pennsylvania
- Crab Run (West Virginia)
