= Cow Run (West Virginia) =

Stream in West Virginia, United States

Coordinates: 39°09′30″N 81°12′11″W

Cow Run is a stream located entirely within Ritchie County, West Virginia. It is a tributary to the North Fork Hughes River.

Cow Run was so named by Native Americans after the buffalo.

== See also ==
- List of rivers of West Virginia
