= Minnie Kendall Lowther =

American journalist, editor, and historian

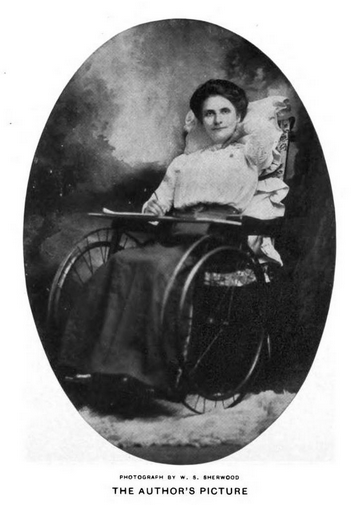
Minnie Kendall Lowther, from her 1911 book, History of Ritchie County

Minnie Kendall Lowther (March 17, 1869 — September 18, 1947) was an American journalist, editor, and local historian. Her name sometimes appears as Minnie Kendall-Lowther.

== Early life ==
Minnie Kendall Lowther was born near present-day Fonzo, West Virginia, the daughter of William George Lowther and Emily Jane Kendall Lowther. Her father was a Union Army veteran of the American Civil War. She was descended from a colonel in the American Revolution, William Lowther.

== Career ==
Minnie Kendall Lowther began working as a teacher, but she left the classroom after injuries from an accident in her twenties. She used a wheelchair for several years, during which she began writing local history articles for The Ritchie Standard newspaper. Her articles became the basis of her 1911 book, History of Ritchie County.

Lowther edited several small West Virginia newspapers including The Pennsboro News, The Wetzel Republican The West Union Record, The Glenville Democrat, and The Upshur Record. Books by Lowther included Mount Vernon, Arlington and Woodlawn (1922), Marshall Hall (1925), Friendship Hill, Home of Albert Gallatin (1928), Mount Vernon, Its Children, Its Romances, Its Allied Families and Mansions (1932), and Blennerhassett Island in Romance and Tragedy (1936). She sometimes used the pen name Evangeline for publications.

Lowther was publicity chair of the West Virginia state Daughters of the American Revolution. She also served on the State Advisory Committee of the West Virginia Equal Suffrage Association.

== Personal life ==
Minnie Kendall Lowther died in 1947, in Harrisville, West Virginia, aged 78 years. Her papers are archived at West Virginia University, and at Blennerhassett Island Historical State Park. In 1990, an unpublished manuscript by Lowther, Ritchie County in History and Romance, was published by the Ritchie County Historical Society.
