= Little Indian Run =

Little Indian Run may refer to:

- Little Indian Run (Little Muncy Creek), in Pennsylvania
- Little Indian Run (West Virginia)
