= Turtle Run =

Stream in West Virginia, United States

Coordinates: 39°09′06″N 80°55′15″W

Turtle Run is a stream located entirely within Ritchie County, West Virginia. It is a tributary of the South Fork Hughes River.

Turtle Run was so named by Native Americans after the turtle.

== See also ==
- List of rivers of West Virginia
