= Grass Run =

Stream in Ritchie County, West Virginia, U.S.

Coordinates: 39°04′27″N 81°03′21″W

Grass Run is a stream in Ritchie County, West Virginia. It is a tributary of the Hughes River.

Grass Run was named for the swamp grass along its course.

== See also ==
- List of rivers of West Virginia
