= Fonzo =

Fonzo may refer to:

- Fonzo, West Virginia, an unincorporated community in Ritchie County, West Virginia
- Capone (2020 film), the original name of the 2020 American biographical drama film
- Fonzo Fargo, a "ring name" of professional wrestler Don Fargo
