= Harrisville Historic District =

Harrisville Historic District may refer to a location in the United States:

- Harrisville Historic District (Harrisville, New Hampshire)
- Harrisville Historic District (Burrillville, Rhode Island)
- Harrisville Historic District (Harrisville, West Virginia), listed on the NRHP in West Virginia
