= North Bend State Park =

State Park in Ritchie County, West Virginia

- IUCN category III (natural monument or feature)
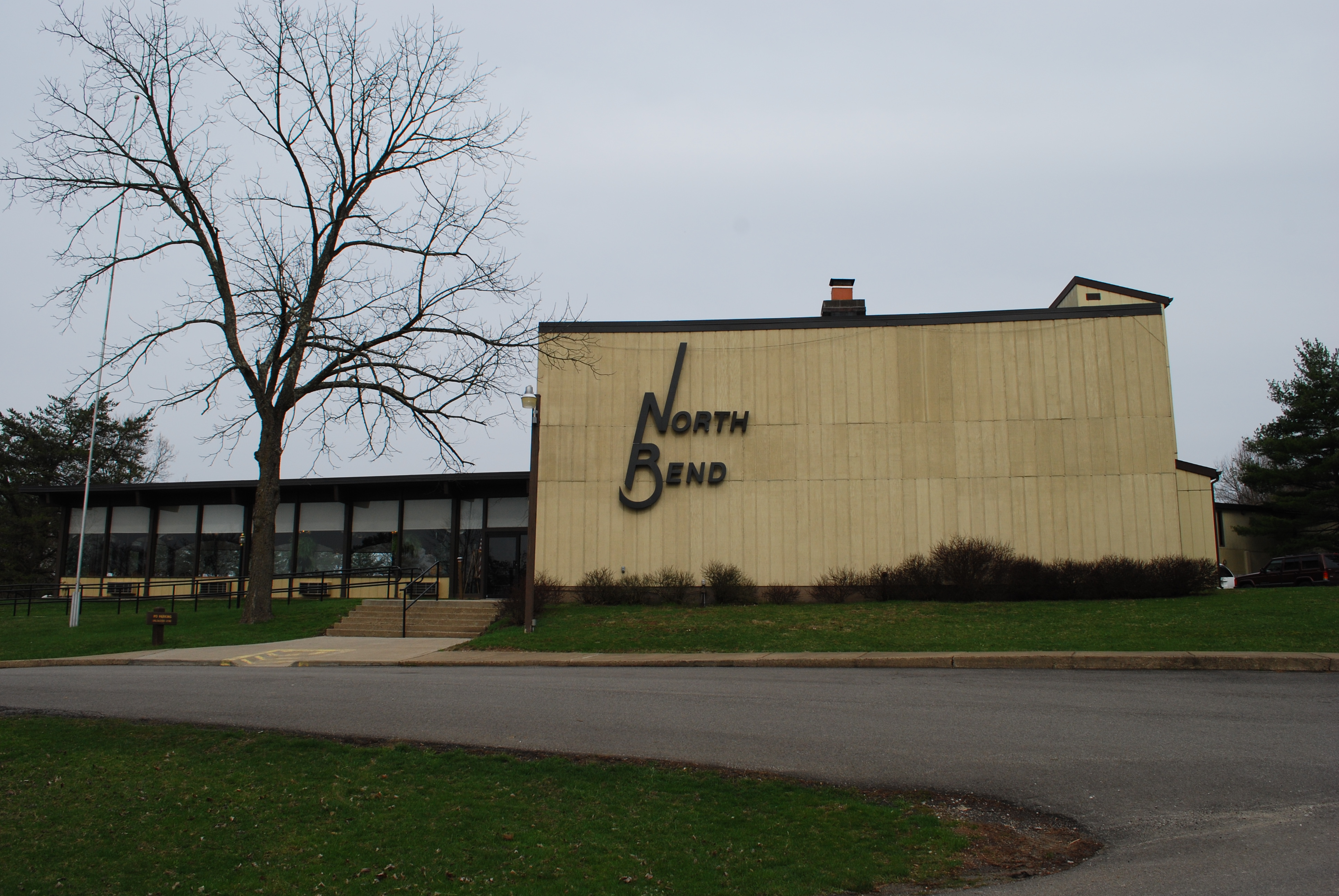
- North Bend Lodge

- Location within West Virginia
- Location: Ritchie, West Virginia, United States
- Coordinates: 39°13′15″N 81°06′35″W
- Area: 2,459 acres (9.95 km^{2})
- Elevation: 981 ft (299 m)
- Established: 1951
- Website: wvstateparks.com/park/north-bend-state-park/

North Bend State Park sits on 2,459 acres (995 ha) along the North Fork of the Hughes River in Ritchie County near Harrisville, West Virginia. The park is named after the sharp bend in the river that the formed three sides of the original park boundary. The North Bend Rail Trail, a 72-mile (116 km) hiking and biking corridor, is also managed as a unit of the park. A new 305 acre (1.23 km^{2}) lake was recently added to the park.

== Features ==
- 29 room Lodge
- 9 cabins
- 49 campsites
- gift shop
- Swimming pool
- Miniature golf
- Hiking trails
- Fishing
- Boating
- Boating rental
- Picnic area
- Basketball court
- North Bend Rail Trail
- North Bend Lake

== Accessibility ==
Accessibility for the disabled was assessed by West Virginia University. The assessment found the campground, picnic area, fishing area, and swimming pool to be accessible. The 2005 assessment found issues with access to the lodge, handrails, emergency exits at the lodge and signage in the lodge parking lot.

The park also features two special amenities designed to accommodate handicapped users.

- The "Extra Mile Trail" is a flat, paved trail suitable for wheelchairs.
- The new North Bend Lake features a Handicapped Fishing Pier.
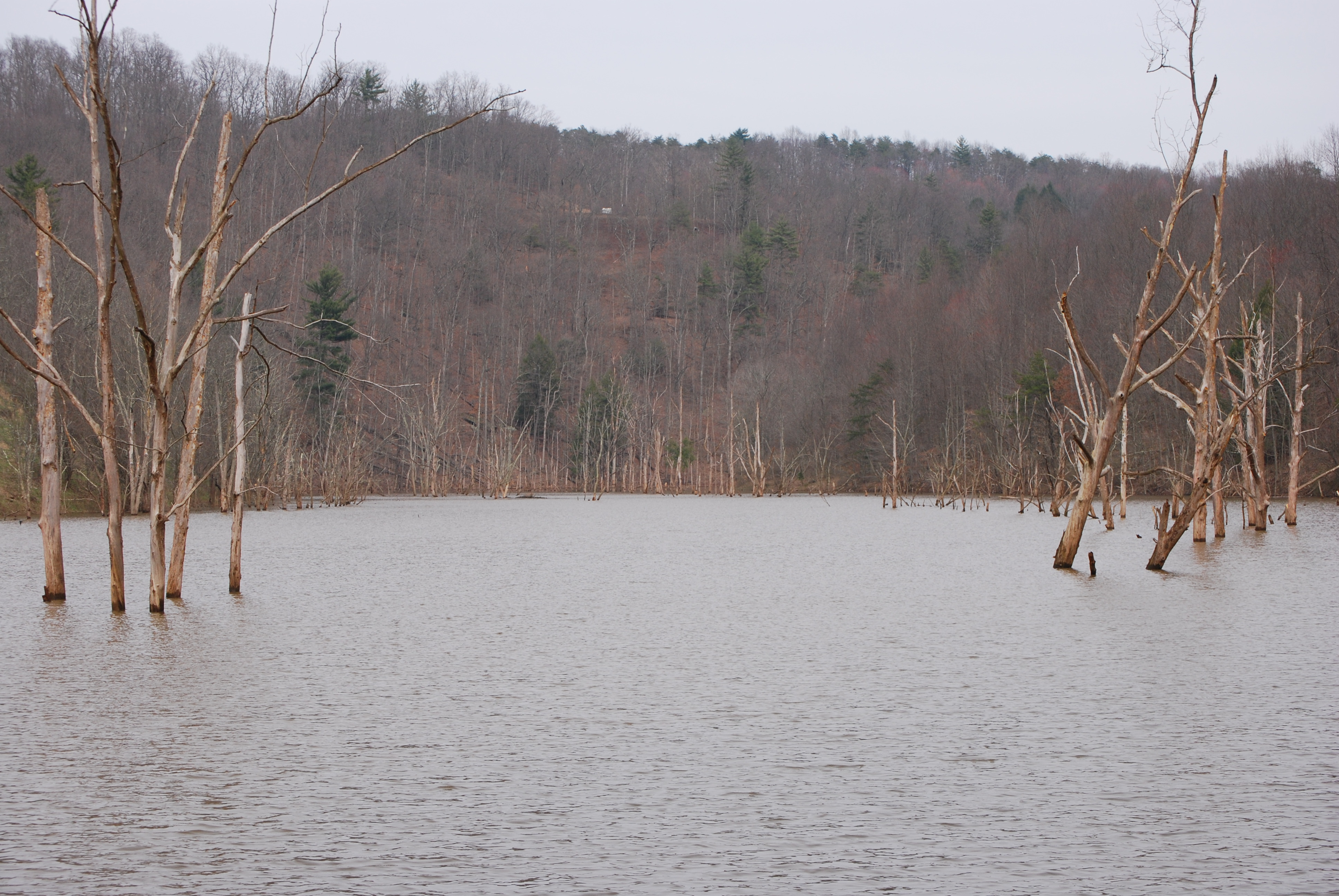
North Bend Lake

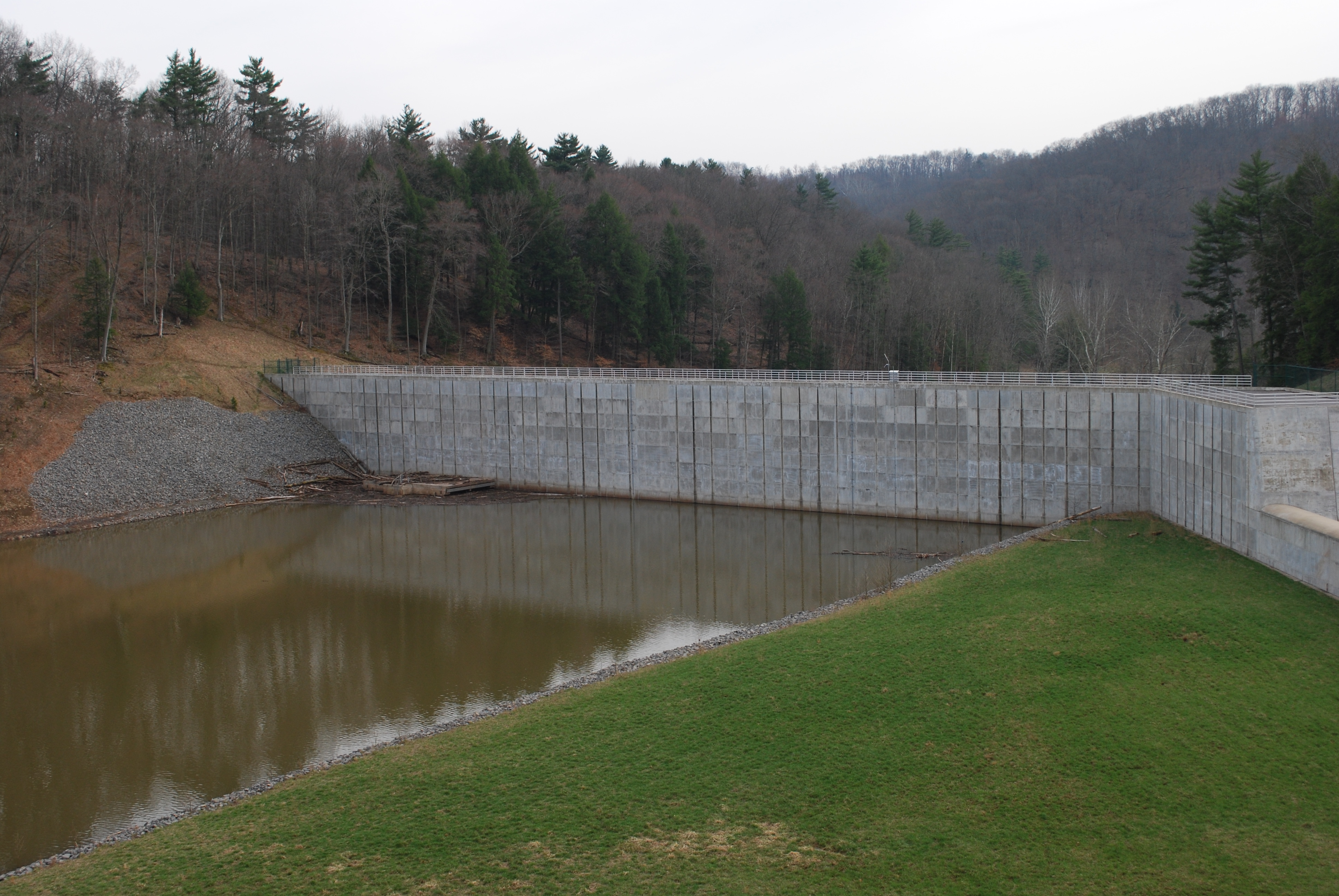
North Bend Dam

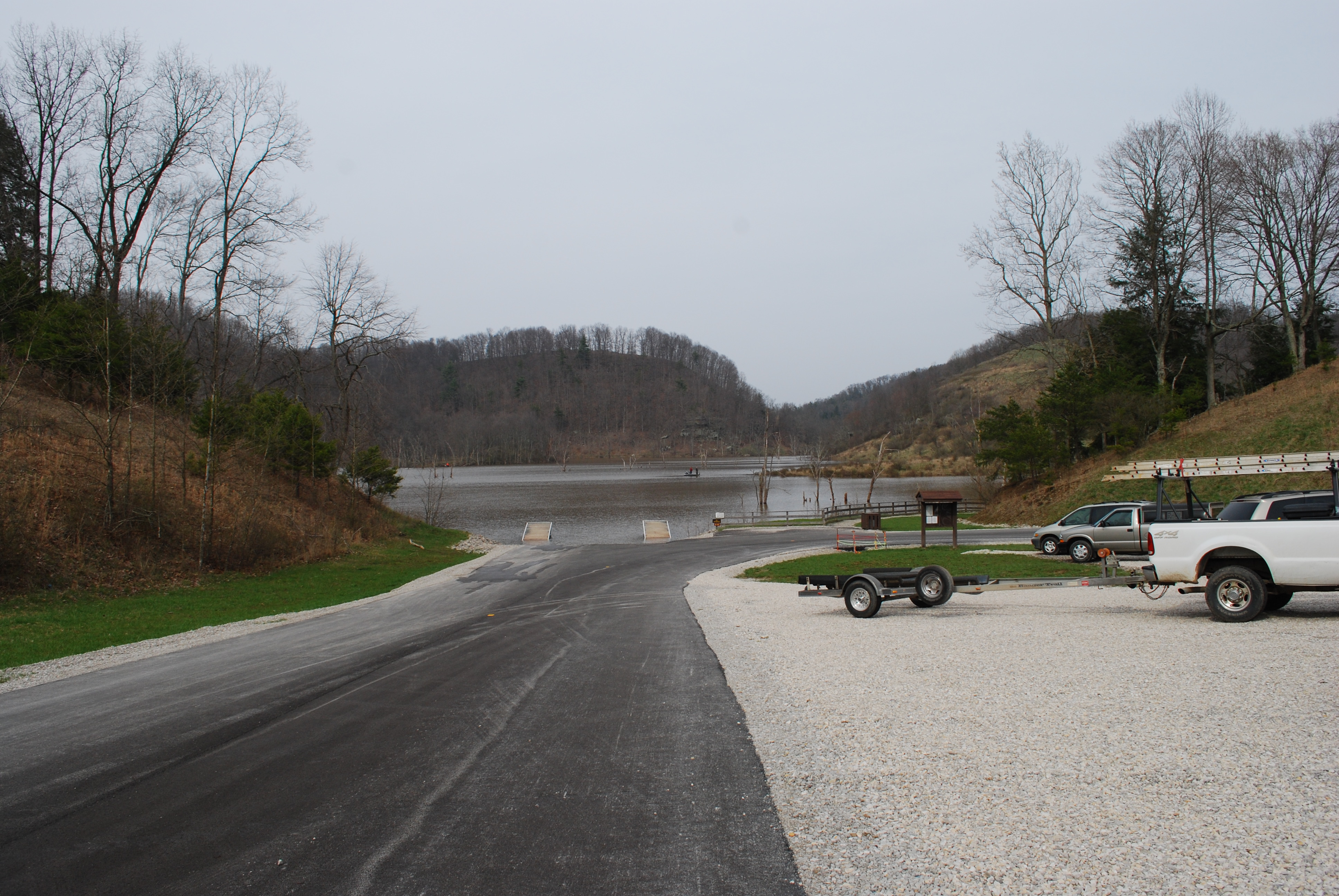
North Bend Lake Boat Launch

== See also ==
- List of West Virginia state parks
- State park
