= Cokeleys, West Virginia =

Unincorporated community in West Virginia, United States

Cokeleys
- Unincorporated community
- Location within the state of West Virginia Cokeleys (the United States)
- Coordinates: 39°9′37″N 81°6′34″W
- Country: United States
- State: West Virginia
- County: Ritchie
- Elevation: 1,145 ft (349 m)
- Time zone: UTC-5 (Eastern (EST))
  - Summer (DST): UTC-4 (EDT)
- GNIS ID: 1554169

Cokeleys is an unincorporated community in Ritchie County, in the U.S. state of West Virginia.

The community was named for Jacob Cokeley.
