= Otterslide Creek =

Stream in Ritchie County, West Virginia

Coordinates: 39°08′05″N 80°55′44″W

Otterslide Creek is a stream in Ritchie County, West Virginia. It is a tributary of the South Fork Hughes River.

Otterslide Creek was so named on account of otters sliding there.

== See also ==
- List of rivers of West Virginia
- Berea, West Virginia
