= Bank of Cairo =

- U.S. National Register of Historic Places
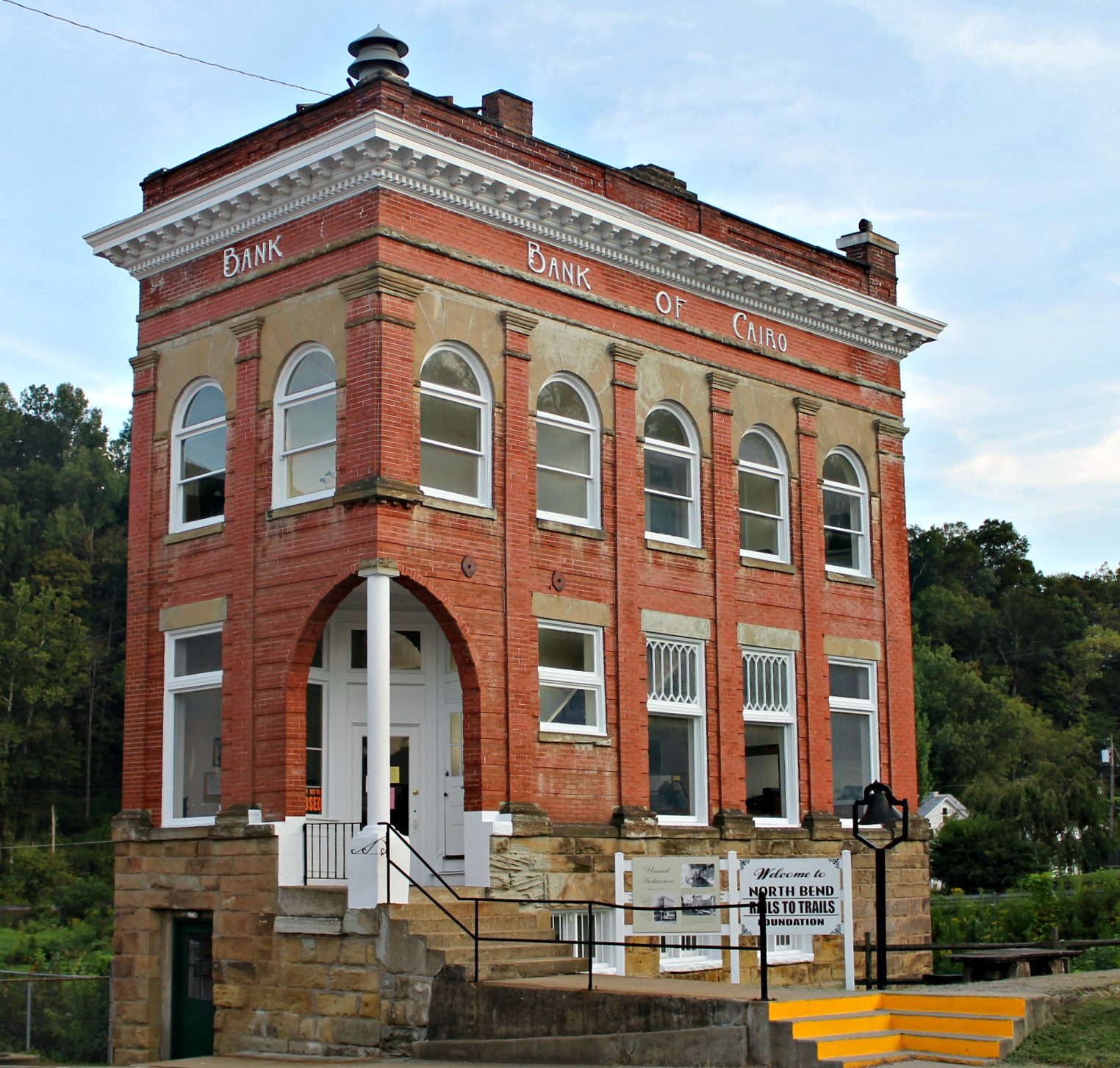
- Bank of Cairo, August 2011

- Location within West Virginia Location within the United States
- Location: Jct. of Main St. and former Baltimore Ohio RR line, Cairo, West Virginia
- Coordinates: 39°12′29″N 81°9′24″W
- Area: less than one acre
- Built: 1897
- Architectural style: Romanesque Revival, Early Commercial
- NRHP reference No.: 96000986
- Added to NRHP: September 19, 1996

Bank of Cairo, now known as Cairo Town Hall, is a historic bank building located at Cairo, Ritchie County, West Virginia. It was built in 1897, and is a 2 1/2-story brick structure with Romanesque and neoclassical details. It features a unique corner entrance. It housed a bank founded by Jacob Cattaui, the son of a wealthy Egyptian banker and cotton plantation owner in 1897. The bank was housed in the same building since its inception in 1897 to 1931 and from 1941 to 1974. It now houses the Cairo Town Hall and serves as a stop on the North Bend Rail Trail.

It was listed on the National Register of Historic Places in 1996.
