= Pullman, West Virginia =

- Town
- Location of Pullman in Ritchie County, West Virginia.
- Coordinates: 39°11′17″N 80°57′6″W
- Country: United States
- State: West Virginia
- County: Ritchie

Area
  - Total: 0.24 sq mi (0.63 km^{2})
  - Land: 0.24 sq mi (0.63 km^{2})
  - Water: 0 sq mi (0.00 km^{2})
- Elevation: 866 ft (264 m)

Population (2020)
  - Total: 135
  - Estimate (2021): 133
  - Density: 559.7/sq mi (216.12/km^{2})
- Time zone: UTC-5 (Eastern (EST))
  - Summer (DST): UTC-4 (EDT)
- ZIP code: 26421
- Area code: 304
- FIPS code: 54-65956
- GNIS feature ID: 1555422

Pullman is a town in Ritchie County, West Virginia, United States. The population was 134 at the 2020 census.

Pullman was platted in 1883, and named after George Pullman, a businessperson in the rail industry.

== Geography ==
Pullman is located at 39°11′17″N 80°57′6″W (39.188133, -80.951555).

According to the United States Census Bureau, the town has a total area of 0.24 square miles (0.62 km^{2}), all land.

== Demographics ==
Historical population
Census	Pop.	Note	%±
1910	230		—
1920	249		8.3%
1930	184		−26.1%
1940	204		10.9%
1950	210		2.9%
1960	162		−22.9%
1970	157		−3.1%
1980	196		24.8%
1990	109		−44.4%
2000	169		55.0%
2010	154		−8.9%
2020	135		−12.3%
2021 (est.)	133	▼	−1.5%
U.S. Decennial Census

=== 2010 census ===
At the 2010 census there were 154 people, 57 households, and 44 families living in the town. The population density was 641.7 inhabitants per square mile (247.8/km^{2}). There were 71 housing units at an average density of 295.8 per square mile (114.2/km^{2}). The racial makeup of the town was 99.4% White and 0.6% from two or more races. Of the 57 households 31.6% had children under the age of 18 living with them, 64.9% were married couples living together, 5.3% had a female householder with no husband present, 7.0% had a male householder with no wife present, and 22.8% were non-families. 17.5% of households were one person and 8.8% were one person aged 65 or older. The average household size was 2.70 and the average family size was 3.02.

The median age in the town was 40 years. 18.8% of residents were under the age of 18; 7.8% were between the ages of 18 and 24; 31.8% were from 25 to 44; 29.9% were from 45 to 64; and 11.7% were 65 or older. The gender makeup of the town was 51.3% male and 48.7% female.

=== 2000 census ===
At the 2000 census there were 169 people, 58 households, and 45 families living in the town. The population density was 697.7 inhabitants per square mile (271.9/km^{2}). There were 69 housing units at an average density of 284.9 per square mile (111.0/km^{2}). The racial makeup of the town was 98.22% White, 0.59% African American and 1.18% Asian. Of the 58 households 41.4% had children under the age of 18 living with them, 62.1% were married couples living together, 13.8% had a female householder with no husband present, and 22.4% were non-families. 20.7% of households were one person and 6.9% were one person aged 65 or older. The average household size was 2.91 and the average family size was 3.38.

The age distribution was 29.0% under the age of 18, 13.6% from 18 to 24, 26.6% from 25 to 44, 20.1% from 45 to 64, and 10.7% 65 or older. The median age was 34 years. For every 100 females, there were 103.6 males. For every 100 females age 18 and over, there were 100.0 males.

The median household income was $19,821 and the median family income was $19,821. Males had a median income of $27,250 versus $18,750 for females. The per capita income for the town was $9,504. About 25.5% of families and 30.8% of the population were below the poverty line, including 18.2% of those under the age of eighteen and 27.8% of those sixty five or over.
