= Little Indian Run (West Virginia) =

Coordinates: 39°07′07″N 81°06′29″W

Little Indian Run is a stream located entirely within Ritchie County, West Virginia. It flows into the Indian Creek, a tributary of the South Fork Hughes River.

Little Indian Run was named after the Native Americans (Indians) in the area.

== See also ==
- List of rivers of West Virginia
