= Bunnell Run =

Stream in West Virginia, U.S.

Coordinates: 39°13′41″N 81°00′50″W

Bunnell Run is a stream in the U.S. state of West Virginia. It is a tributary of the North Fork Hughes River.

Bunnell Run has the name of John Bunnell, a pioneer who settled there around 1800.

== See also ==
- List of rivers of West Virginia
