= Berdine's Five and Dime =

Coordinates: 39.209917°N 81.051847°W

Berdine's Five and Dime is a 115-year-old store located at 106 N. Court Street in Harrisville, West Virginia. The "five and dime" store in Ritchie County sells novelty and historic items, including tin toys, handmade glass Christmas ornaments from the Czech Republic, gag items, penny candies and other oddities. The store celebrated its 100th birthday in 2008. It has been referred to as West Virginia's oldest Five and Dime store and is "full of the stuff you used to see at 5 and 10 cent stores... in every small town in America." The store includes its original antique confection counter, oak shelves and counters, and tin ceilings.

== History ==
In 1908 K.C. Berdine and his brother, Lafayette opened Hunt and Berdines five and dime at the corners of Court and Main Streets. After initial success, the store moved to its current location in 1915 which was built specifically to house the five and dime. Today, the iconic white-and-black two-story building houses the store on the bottom floor, while the Independent Order of Odd Fellows meets upstairs. KC's son Fred ran the store from 1954 until 1983, when the Six family bought the store and has owned it since.

It is located in the Harrisville Historic District.
