= Harrisville Grade School =

- U.S. National Register of Historic Places
- U.S. Historic district – Contributing property
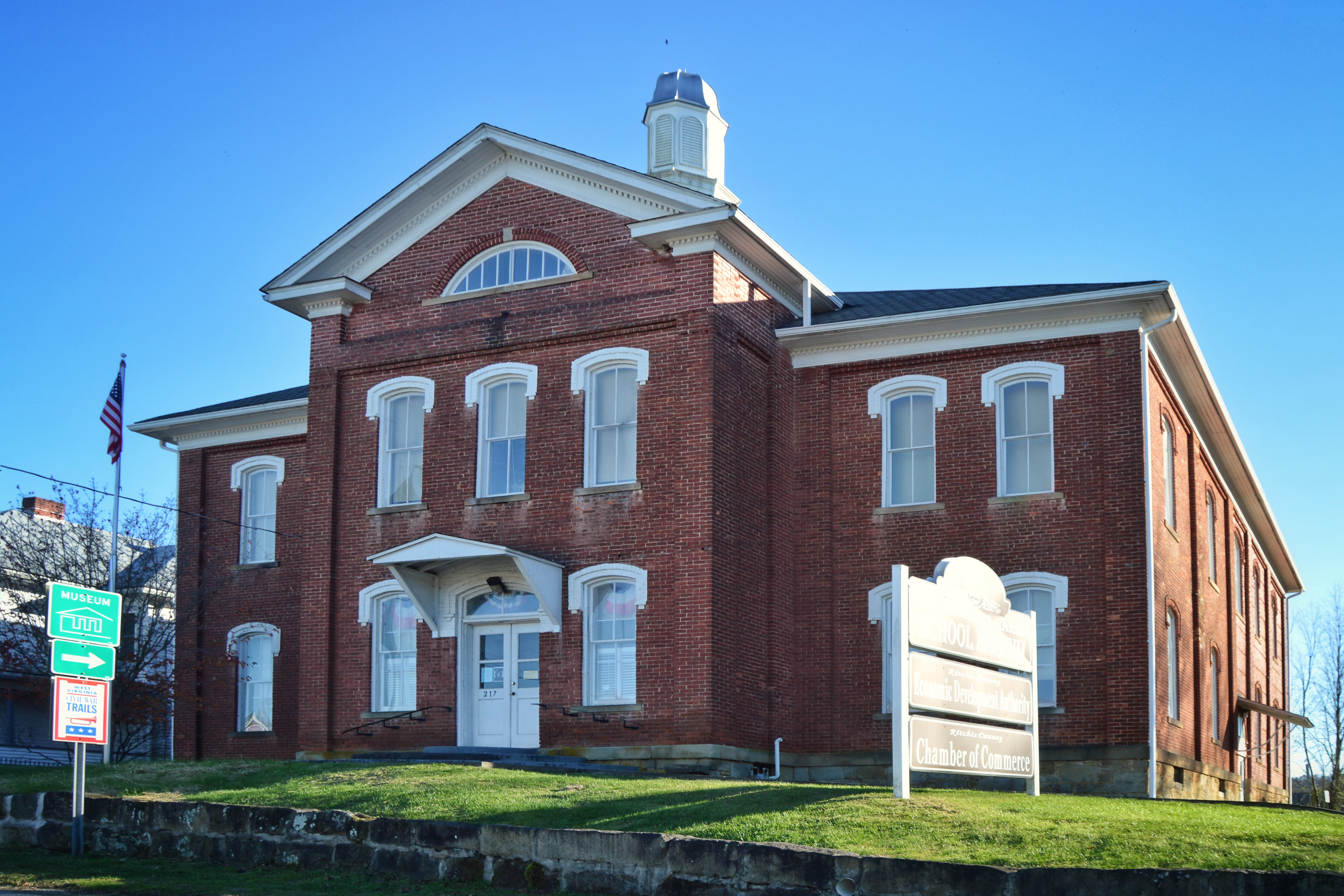
- Front and western side

- Location within West Virginia Location within the United States
- Location: 217 W. Main St., Harrisville, West Virginia
- Coordinates: 39°12′34″N 81°03′14″W
- Area: less than one acre
- Built: 1878
- Architectural style: Italianate, Greek Revival
- Part of: Harrisville Historic District (ID11000558)
- NRHP reference No.: 96001570

Significant dates
- Added to NRHP: January 9, 1997
- Designated CP: August 18, 2011

Harrisville Grade School, also known as Harrisville High School and Harrisville Public School, is a historic school building located at Harrisville, Ritchie County, West Virginia. It is a two-story brick structure on a cut stone foundation with a blend of Italianate and Greek Revival details. It was built in 1878, and expanded in 1904. It remained in operation until 1965, then occupied by board of education offices. In the 1990s, plans were made for it to become a museum. It is open by the Ritchie County Historical Museum as the General Thomas M. Harris School Museum.

It was listed on the National Register of Historic Places in 1997. It is located in the Harrisville Historic District.
