= Cisco, West Virginia =

Unincorporated community in West Virginia, United States

Cisco
- Unincorporated community
- Location within the state of West Virginia Cisco (the United States)
- Coordinates: 39°7′43″N 81°17′4″W
- Country: United States
- State: West Virginia
- County: Ritchie
- Elevation: 646 ft (197 m)
- Time zone: UTC-5 (Eastern (EST))
  - Summer (DST): UTC-4 (EDT)
- GNIS ID: 1549626

Cisco is an unincorporated community in Ritchie County, West Virginia, United States.
