= Crab Run (West Virginia) =

Coordinates: 39°04′05″N 81°07′18″W

Crab Run is a stream located entirely within Ritchie County, West Virginia. It is a tributary of South Fork Hughes River.

Crab Run was descriptively named on account of crayfish in its waters.

== See also ==
- List of rivers of West Virginia
