= Jesse Hughes (frontiersman) =

Jesse Hughes (c. 1750 – c. 1829) was a frontiersman, hunter, and scout who was an early settler in the western region of Virginia that became West Virginia and Kentucky. Hughes was noted for his hatred of Native Americans, and is said to have killed many in battle, and murdered several others. "He was as savage as a wolf, and he liked to kill an Indian better than to eat his dinner", said the wife of one of his descendants in 1902.

McWhorter alleges a variety of familial relationships, but without primary evidence, asserting that his father was Thomas Hughes (who died April 1778) and Jesse had a younger brother named Thomas (born 1769). Jesse himself was born about 1750 (rather than 1768). Hughes married Grace Tanner in 1771. They had two daughters, Martha and Massie (who married Uriah Gandee, son of Uriah Gandee Sr. and Suzanne Teter; Massie and Uriah's daughter Sarah Gandee married Charles Droddy). They also had a son named James Stanley.

Jesse and his family lived in a cabin on Hacker's Creek, near a stream that is now known as "Jesse's Run", located in present-day Lewis County, West Virginia See McWhorter's Chapter 23, "Genealogy of the Hughes Family" for more names.

Hughes is believed to have been one of the first American colonists to explore the Hughes River in West Virginia. It may have been named for him, or for others of the same surname residing in the area during roughly the same time period.
