= 1912 United States presidential election in West Virginia =

- November 5, 1912

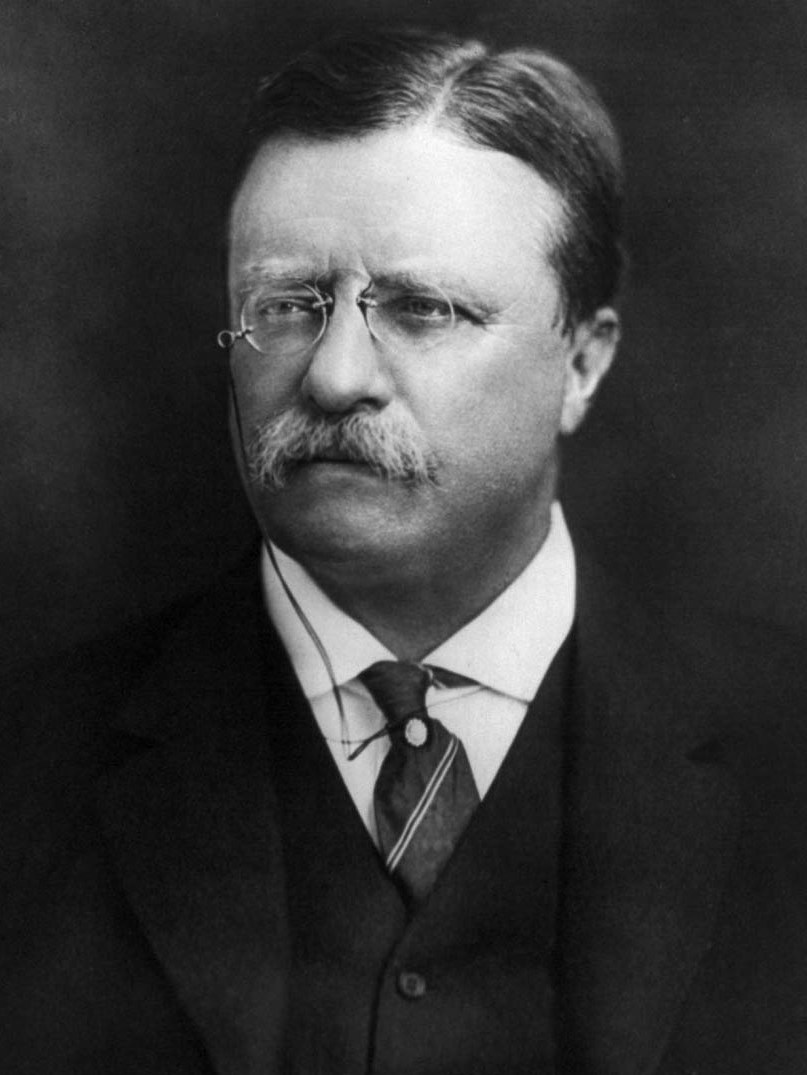

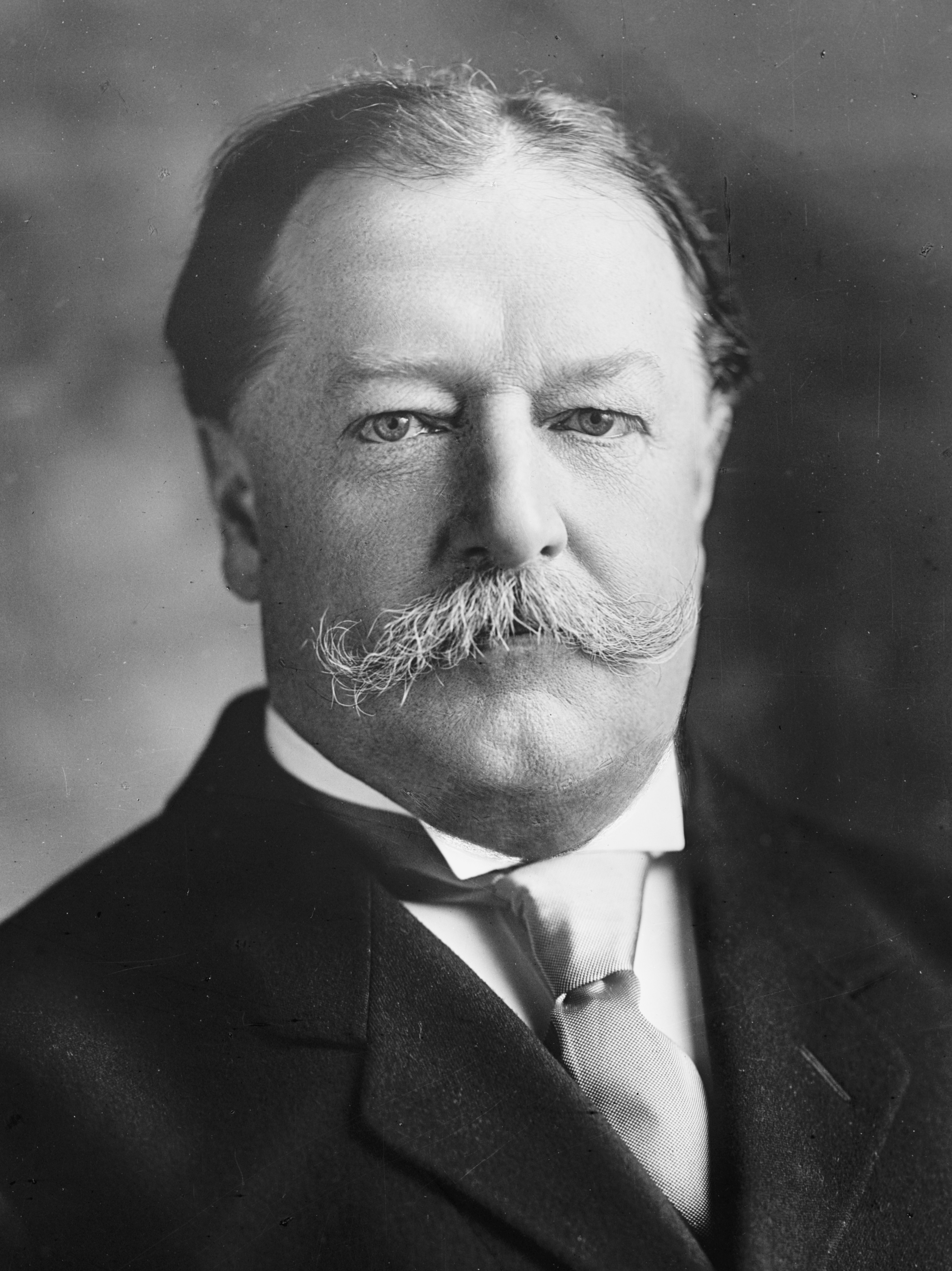

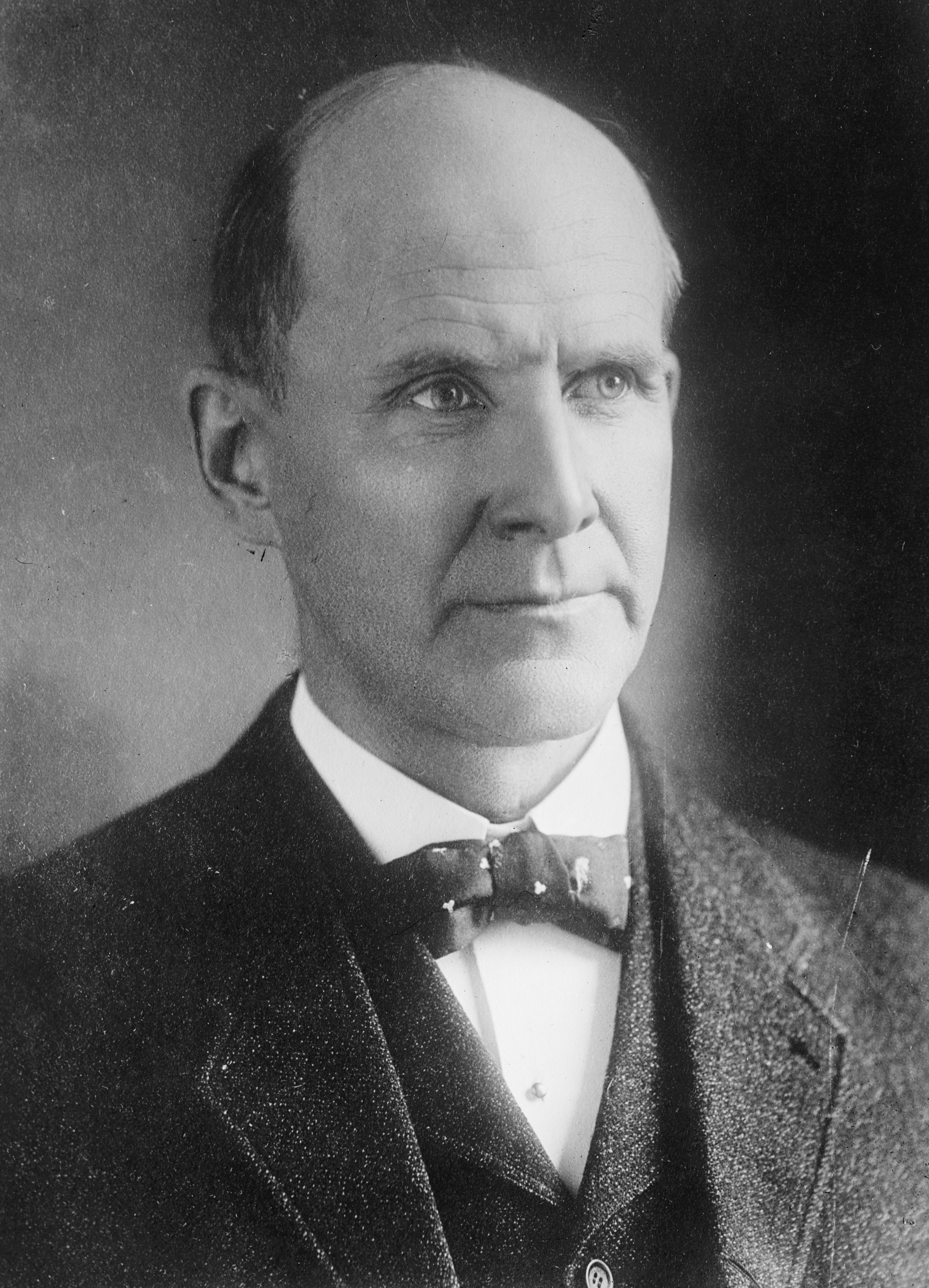
Nominee	Woodrow Wilson	Theodore Roosevelt
Party	Democratic	Progressive
Home state	New Jersey	New York
Running mate	Thomas R. Marshall	Hiram Johnson
Electoral vote	8	0
Popular vote	113,197	79,112
Percentage	42.11%	29.43%
Nominee	William Howard Taft	Eugene V. Debs
Party	Republican	Socialist
Home state	Ohio	Indiana
Running mate	Nicholas Murray Butler	Emil Seidel
Electoral vote	0	0
Popular vote	56,754	15,248
Percentage	21.11%	5.67%
County results
Wilson
30–40%
40–50%
50–60%
60–70%
70–80%
Roosevelt
30–40%
40–50%
50–60%
Taft
30–40%
40–50%
President before election
William Howard Taft
Republican
Elected President
Woodrow Wilson
Democratic

The 1912 United States presidential election in West Virginia took place on November 5, 1912, as part of the 1912 United States presidential election. West Virginia voters chose eight representatives, or electors, to the Electoral College, who voted for president and vice president.

West Virginia was won by Princeton University President Woodrow Wilson (D–Virginia), running with governor of Indiana Thomas R. Marshall, with 42.11% of the popular vote, against the 26th president of the United States Theodore Roosevelt (P–New York), running with governor of California Hiram Johnson, with 29.43% of the popular vote, the 27th president of the United States William Howard Taft (R–Ohio), running with Columbia University President Nicholas Murray Butler, with 21.11% of the popular vote and the five-time candidate of the Socialist Party of America for President of the United States Eugene V. Debs (S–Indiana), running with the first Socialist mayor of a major city in the United States Emil Seidel, with 5.67% of the popular vote. As of the 2024 presidential election, this is the last election in which Ritchie County voted for a Democratic presidential candidate, as well as the only election in which Grant County did not vote for the Republican candidate.

== Results ==
1912 United States presidential election in West Virginia
Party	Candidate	Votes	%
Democratic	Woodrow Wilson	113,197	42.11%
Progressive	Theodore Roosevelt	79,112	29.43%
Republican	William Howard Taft (incumbent)	56,754	21.11%
Socialist	Eugene V. Debs	15,248	5.67%
Prohibition	Eugene W. Chafin	4,517 (Note: These Prohibition Party votes were not shown for individual counties but only as a state-wide total.)	1.68%
Total votes		268,828	100.00%

=== Results by county ===
1912 United States presidential election in West Virginia by county
County	Woodrow Wilson Democratic		William Howard Taft Republican		Theodore Roosevelt Progressive "Bull Moose"		Eugene V. Debs Socialist		Margin (Note: Because Roosevelt finished ahead of Taft in West Virginia as a whole, all margins give are Wilson minus Roosevelt unless stated in the total for the county in question.)		Total votes cast
County	#	%	#	%	#	%	#	%	#	%	Total votes cast
Barbour	1,561	42.29%	607	16.45%	1,424	38.58%	99	2.68%	137	3.71%	3,691
Berkeley	2,703	50.14%	1,349	25.02%	1,204	22.33%	135	2.50%	1,354 (Note: In this county where Taft did run ahead of Roosevelt, margin given is Wilson vote minus Taft vote and percentage margin Wilson percentage minus Taft percentage.)	25.12%	5,391
Boone	1,119	45.19%	416	16.80%	627	25.32%	314	12.68%	492	19.87%	2,476
Braxton	2,611	51.74%	580	11.49%	1,816	35.99%	39	0.77%	795	15.76%	5,046
Brooke	850	33.74%	972	38.59%	453	17.98%	244	9.69%	-122	-4.85%	2,519
Cabell	4,793	46.62%	1,798	17.49%	3,210	31.22%	480	4.67%	1,583	15.40%	10,281
Calhoun	1,349	55.93%	575	23.84%	476	19.73%	12	0.50%	774	32.09%	2,412
Clay	932	44.28%	352	16.72%	766	36.39%	55	2.61%	166	7.89%	2,105
Doddridge	866	31.79%	622	22.83%	1,192	43.76%	44	1.62%	-326	-11.97%	2,724
Fayette	3,757	34.09%	2,697	24.47%	3,140	28.49%	1,428	12.96%	617	5.60%	11,022
Gilmer	1,493	59.72%	469	18.76%	516	20.64%	22	0.88%	977	39.08%	2,500
Grant	356	20.42%	349	20.02%	1,025	58.81%	13	0.75%	-669	-38.39%	1,743
Greenbrier	2,707	51.96%	622	11.94%	1,797	34.49%	84	1.61%	910	17.47%	5,210
Hampshire	1,777	72.44%	406	16.55%	266	10.84%	4	0.16%	1,371	55.89%	2,453
Hancock	634	32.02%	664	33.54%	557	28.13%	125	6.31%	-30	-1.52%	1,980
Hardy	1,209	64.51%	344	18.36%	314	16.76%	7	0.37%	865	46.16%	1,874
Harrison	4,378	41.10%	1,754	16.47%	3,443	32.32%	1,077	10.11%	935	8.78%	10,652
Jackson	1,935	42.65%	1,199	26.43%	1,355	29.87%	48	1.06%	580	12.78%	4,537
Jefferson	2,525	67.79%	993	26.66%	152	4.08%	55	1.48%	1,532	41.13%	3,725
Kanawha	6,658	37.26%	1,780	9.96%	6,360	35.59%	3,071	17.19%	298	1.67%	17,869
Lewis	1,929	45.39%	1,029	24.21%	1,146	26.96%	146	3.44%	783	18.42%	4,250
Lincoln	1,876	44.87%	631	15.09%	1,618	38.70%	56	1.34%	258	6.17%	4,181
Logan	1,404	49.95%	518	18.43%	642	22.84%	247	8.79%	762	27.11%	2,811
Marion	4,535	48.08%	1,625	17.23%	2,447	25.94%	826	8.76%	2,088	22.14%	9,433
Marshall	2,405	37.71%	1,610	25.24%	1,842	28.88%	521	8.17%	563	8.83%	6,378
Mason	1,812	37.95%	1,024	21.45%	1,692	35.43%	247	5.17%	120	2.51%	4,775
McDowell	2,497	26.77%	4,341	46.54%	2,425	26.00%	64	0.69%	-1,844	-19.77%	9,327
Mercer	3,497	43.07%	1,507	18.56%	2,958	36.43%	158	1.95%	539	6.64%	8,120
Mineral	1,367	39.16%	513	14.69%	1,446	41.42%	165	4.73%	-79	-2.26%	3,491
Mingo	1,832	42.05%	1,569	36.01%	884	20.29%	72	1.65%	263	6.04%	4,357
Monongalia	1,673	31.92%	1,216	23.20%	1,772	33.81%	580	11.07%	-99	-1.89%	5,241
Monroe	1,570	50.21%	798	25.52%	742	23.73%	17	0.54%	772	24.69%	3,127
Morgan	549	31.30%	612	34.89%	518	29.53%	75	4.28%	-63	-3.59%	1,754
Nicholas	2,018	49.75%	584	14.40%	1,425	35.13%	29	0.71%	593	14.62%	4,056
Ohio	5,771	41.30%	3,956	28.31%	2,666	19.08%	1,579	11.30%	1,815	12.99%	13,972
Pendleton	1,162	55.65%	475	22.75%	434	20.79%	17	0.81%	687	32.90%	2,088
Pleasants	796	47.52%	493	29.43%	364	21.73%	22	1.31%	303	18.09%	1,675
Pocahontas	1,428	44.67%	589	18.42%	1,086	33.97%	94	2.94%	342	10.70%	3,197
Preston	1,845	31.20%	1,461	24.70%	2,387	40.36%	221	3.74%	-542	-9.16%	5,914
Putnam	1,540	40.55%	531	13.98%	1,401	36.89%	326	8.58%	139	3.66%	3,798
Raleigh	2,343	35.89%	897	13.74%	2,854	43.72%	434	6.65%	-511	-7.83%	6,528
Randolph	2,563	50.25%	756	14.82%	1,411	27.66%	371	7.27%	1,152	22.58%	5,101
Ritchie	1,270	35.65%	937	26.31%	1,264	35.49%	91	2.55%	6	0.17%	3,562
Roane	2,045	45.70%	708	15.82%	1,670	37.32%	52	1.16%	375	8.38%	4,475
Summers	2,111	49.79%	791	18.66%	1,250	29.48%	88	2.08%	861	20.31%	4,240
Taylor	1,445	38.77%	791	21.22%	1,316	35.31%	175	4.70%	129	3.46%	3,727
Tucker	1,221	37.15%	548	16.67%	1,265	38.48%	253	7.70%	-44	-1.33%	3,287
Tyler	1,193	37.30%	706	22.08%	1,129	35.30%	170	5.32%	64	2.00%	3,198
Upshur	895	25.59%	835	23.88%	1,706	48.78%	61	1.74%	-811	-23.19%	3,497
Wayne	2,634	52.88%	1,465	29.41%	797	16.00%	85	1.71%	1,169	23.47%	4,981
Webster	1,330	60.90%	307	14.06%	524	23.99%	23	1.05%	806	36.90%	2,184
Wetzel	2,710	57.68%	1,092	23.24%	733	15.60%	163	3.47%	1,618	34.44%	4,698
Wirt	953	48.72%	213	10.89%	762	38.96%	28	1.43%	191	9.76%	1,956
Wood	3,784	44.29%	2,509	29.37%	1,823	21.34%	428	5.01%	1,275	14.92%	8,544
Wyoming	881	42.40%	569	27.38%	620	29.84%	8	0.38%	261	12.56%	2,078
Totals	113,197	42.11%	56,754	21.11%	79,112	29.43%	15,248	7.35%	34,085	12.68%	268,828

== See also ==
- United States presidential elections in West Virginia
