= Bee Run (Spring Creek tributary) =

Stream in Ohio, United States

Coordinates: 40°6′55″N 84°10′27″W

Bee Run is a stream located entirely within Miami County, Ohio. It is a tributary of Spring Creek.

Bee Run was named for the frequent honeybees along its course.

== See also ==
- List of rivers of Ohio
