= Harrisville Historic District (Harrisville, West Virginia) =

Historic district in West Virginia, United States

- U.S. National Register of Historic Places
- U.S. Historic district
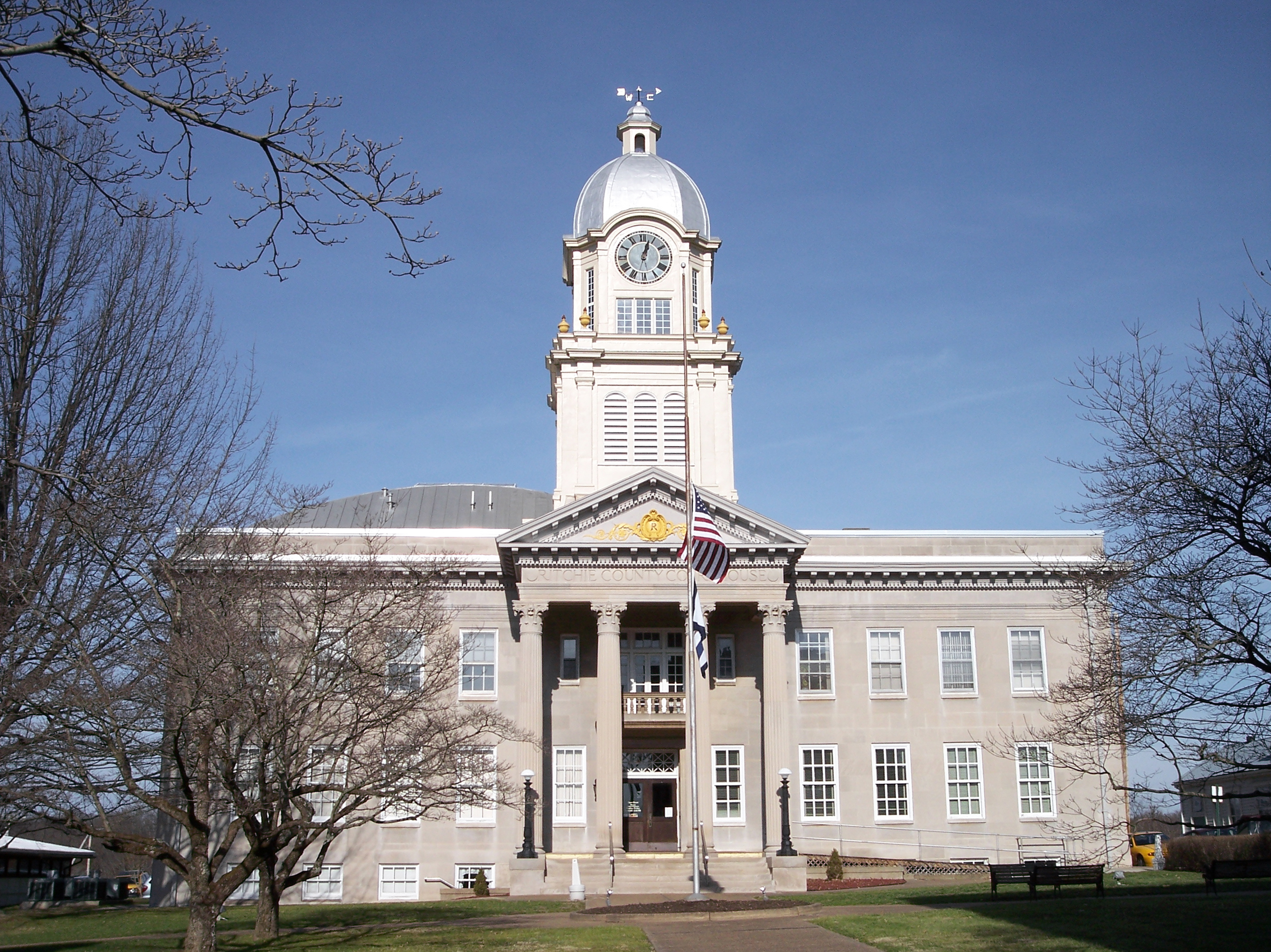
- Ritchie County Courthouse, January 2007

- Location within West Virginia Location within the United States
- Location: Roughly bound by North, South, and Stout Streets and Moats Avenue, Harrisville, West Virginia
- Coordinates: 39°12′36″N 81°03′11″W
- Area: 53 acres (21 ha)
- Built: c. 1860-1957
- Built by: Foreman & Putnam
- Architect: Holmboe & Pogue
- Architectural style: Gothic Revival, Late Victorian, Colonial Revival, Tudor Revival
- NRHP reference No.: 11000558
- Added to NRHP: August 18, 2011

Harrisville Historic District is a national historic district located at Harrisville, Ritchie County, West Virginia. The district encompasses 111 contributing buildings, 1 contributing site, and 15 contributing structures in Harrisville. It includes residential, commercial, and governmental buildings dating from the mid-19th through mid-20th century. They are in variety of popular architectural styles including Gothic Revival, Late Victorian, Colonial Revival, and Tudor Revival. Notable buildings include the Heritage Inn (c. 1930), the Lowther Building (c. 1910), Lowther House (1948), the Trading Post, the Deem Building, the Lawrence Building (c. 1898), railroad passenger depot (c. 1910), St. Luke's United Methodist Church (c. 1895), Harrisville Church of Christ (c. 1925), Stout Hardware, and Berdine's 5&10 Variety Store (1915). Located in the district are the separately listed Ritchie County Courthouse and the Harrisville Grade School.

It was listed on the National Register of Historic Places in 2011.
