= Auburn, West Virginia =

- Town
- Location of Auburn in Ritchie County, West Virginia.
- Coordinates: 39°5′44″N 80°51′24″W
- Country: United States
- State: West Virginia
- County: Ritchie
- Incorporated: 1900

Government
  - Mayor: Robert Lowther

Area
  - Total: 0.34 sq mi (0.87 km^{2})
  - Land: 0.34 sq mi (0.87 km^{2})
  - Water: 0 sq mi (0.00 km^{2})
- Elevation: 827 ft (252 m)

Population (2020)
  - Total: 79
  - Estimate (2021): 79
  - Density: 262.9/sq mi (101.51/km^{2})
- Time zone: UTC-5 (Eastern (EST))
  - Summer (DST): UTC-4 (EDT)
- ZIP code: 26325
- Area code: 304
- FIPS code: 54-03364
- GNIS feature ID: 1553764
- Website: https://local.wv.gov/Auburn/Pages/default.aspx

Auburn is a town in Ritchie County, West Virginia, United States. The population was 80 at the 2020 census. Auburn was incorporated in 1900.

== Geography ==
Auburn is located at 39°5′44″N 80°51′24″W (39.095430, -80.856538), in the east south-east corner of Ritchie County.

According to the United States Census Bureau, the town has a total area of 0.34 square miles (0.88 km^{2}), all land.

== Demographics ==
Historical population
Census	Pop.	Note	%±
1880	109		—
1910	199		—
1920	177		−11.1%
1930	166		−6.2%
1940	168		1.2%
1950	149		−11.3%
1960	139		−6.7%
1970	115		−17.3%
1980	116		0.9%
1990	89		−23.3%
2000	103		15.7%
2010	97		−5.8%
2020	79		−18.6%
2021 (est.)	79	Steady	0.0%
U.S. Decennial Census

=== 2010 census ===
As of the census of 2010, there were 97 people, 45 households, and 27 families living in the town. The population density was 285.3 inhabitants per square mile (110.2/km^{2}). There were 56 housing units at an average density of 164.7 per square mile (63.6/km^{2}). The racial makeup of the town was 100.0% White.

There were 45 households, of which 31.1% had children under the age of 18 living with them, 40.0% were married couples living together, 13.3% had a female householder with no husband present, 6.7% had a male householder with no wife present, and 40.0% were non-families. 40.0% of all households were made up of individuals, and 6.6% had someone living alone who was 65 years of age or older. The average household size was 2.16 and the average family size was 2.85.

The median age in the town was 41.5 years. 23.7% of residents were under the age of 18; 7.2% were between the ages of 18 and 24; 22.7% were from 25 to 44; 33.9% were from 45 to 64; and 12.4% were 65 years of age or older. The gender makeup of the town was 49.5% male and 50.5% female.

=== 2000 census ===
As of the census of 2000, there were 103 people, 41 households, and 31 families living in the town. The population density was 308.0 inhabitants per square mile (119.2/km^{2}). There were 48 housing units at an average density of 143.5 per square mile (56.2/km^{2}). The racial makeup of the town was 99.03% White and 0.97% Asian.

There were 40 households, out of which 40.0% had children under the age of 18 living with them, 47.5% were married couples living together, 17.5% had a female householder with no husband present, and 20.0% were non-families. 17.5% of all households were made up of individuals, and 7.5% had someone living alone who was 65 years of age or older. The average household size was 2.58 and the average family size was 2.88.

In the town, the population was spread out, with 24.3% under the age of 18, 9.7% from 18 to 24, 28.2% from 25 to 44, 26.2% from 45 to 64, and 11.7% who were 65 years of age or older. The median age was 37 years. For every 100 females, there were 114.6 males. For every 100 females age 18 and over, there were 95.0 males.

The median income for a household in the town was $19,063, and the median income for a family was $19,375. Males had a median income of $21,250 versus $13,750 for females. The per capita income for the town was $8,548. There were 32.4% of families and 34.3% of the population living below the poverty line, including 52.4% of under eighteens and none of those over 64.

Approximately 25% of the population reports German ancestry, 13% English, 9% Irish, 1% Canadian and 1% Japanese.
