= Bee Run (Ritchie County, West Virginia) =

Stream in West Virginia, United States

Coordinates: 39°11′57″N 80°54′16″W

Bee Run is a stream located entirely within Ritchie County, West Virginia. It is a tributary to Right Fork White Oak Creek.

Bee Run was descriptively named by the Native Americans in the area.

== See also ==
- List of rivers of West Virginia
