= Newark, West Virginia =

Newark
- Unincorporated community
- Location within the state of West Virginia Newark (the United States)
- Coordinates: 39°7′8″N 81°23′51″W
- Country: United States
- State: West Virginia
- County: Wirt
- Elevation: 643 ft (196 m)
- Time zone: UTC-5 (Eastern (EST))
  - Summer (DST): UTC-4 (EDT)
- Area codes: 304 and 681
- GNIS feature ID: 1558377

Newark (also Pribble Mills) is an unincorporated community in Wirt County, West Virginia, United States. As of the 2020 census, Newark had a population of 496. Its elevation is 643 feet (196 m).
