= Spring Creek (Great Miami River tributary) =

Stream in Ohio, U.S.

Coordinates: 40°04′03″N 84°12′48″W

Spring Creek is a stream in the U.S. state of Ohio. The 12.4-mile (20.0 km) stream is a tributary of the Great Miami River.

Spring Creek was so named for the fact it is a spring-fed creek.

== See also ==
- List of rivers of Ohio
