= Hughes River (West Virginia) =

River in West Virginia, United States

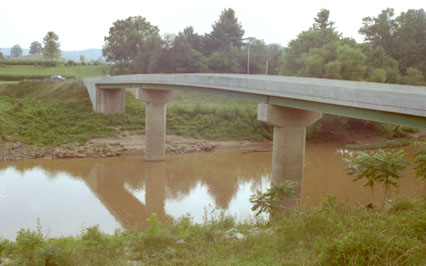
- Hughes River at Freeport

Location
- Country: United States
- State: West Virginia
- Counties: Ritchie, Wirt

Physical characteristics
- Source: South Fork Hughes River
  - location: Doddridge County
  - coordinates: 39°09′46″N 80°44′44″W
  - elevation: 1,074 ft (327 m)
- 2nd source: North Fork Hughes River
  - location: Ritchie County
  - coordinates: 39°23′14″N 80°55′59″W
  - elevation: 1,098 ft (335 m)
- Source confluence
  - location: near Cisco
  - coordinates: 39°07′05″N 81°16′38″W
  - elevation: 614 ft (187 m)
- Mouth: Little Kanawha River
  - location: near Newark
  - coordinates: 39°08′24″N 81°23′43″W
  - elevation: 584 ft (178 m)
- Length: 18 mi (29 km)

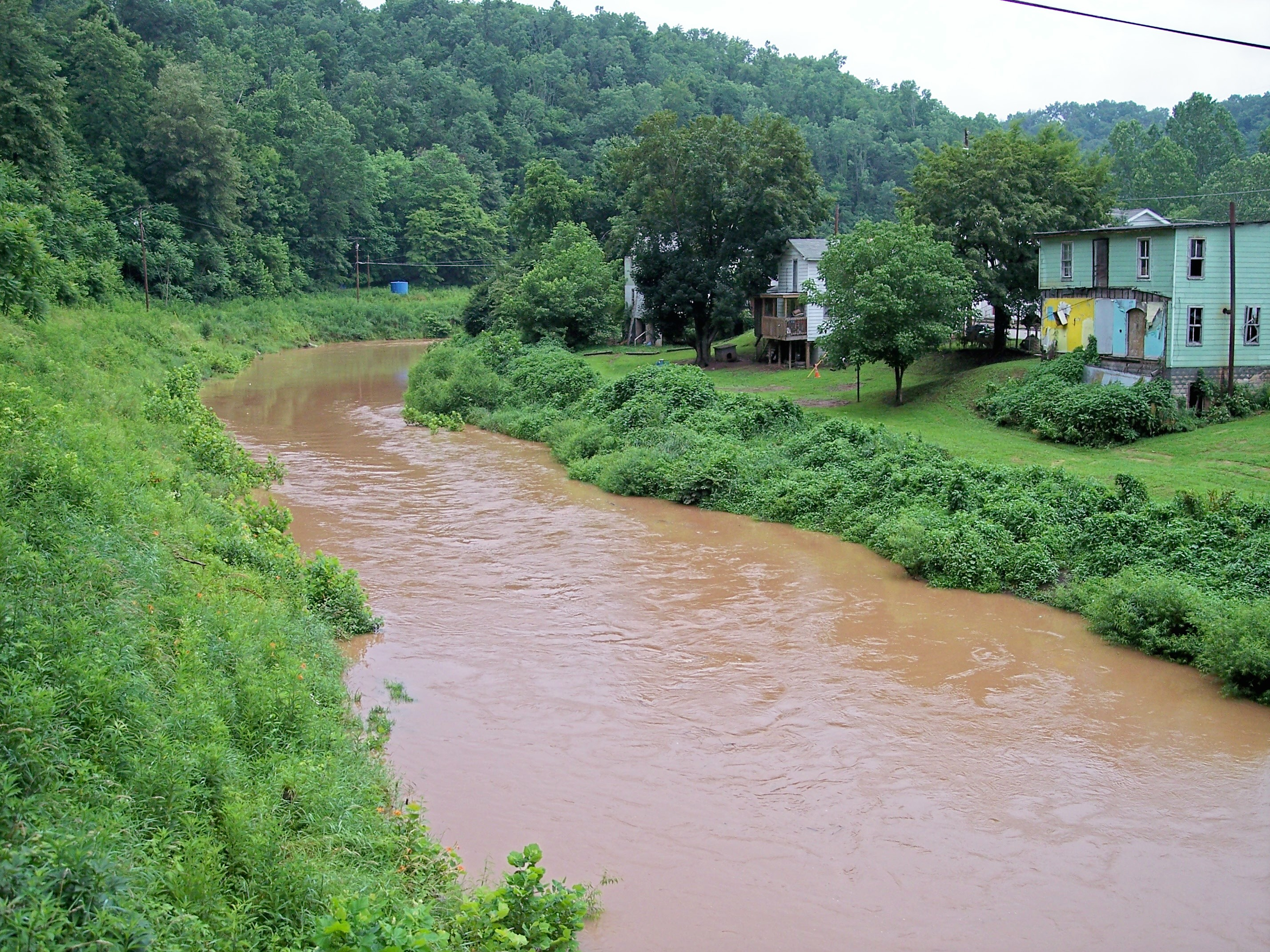
The North Fork of the Hughes River in Cairo in 2006

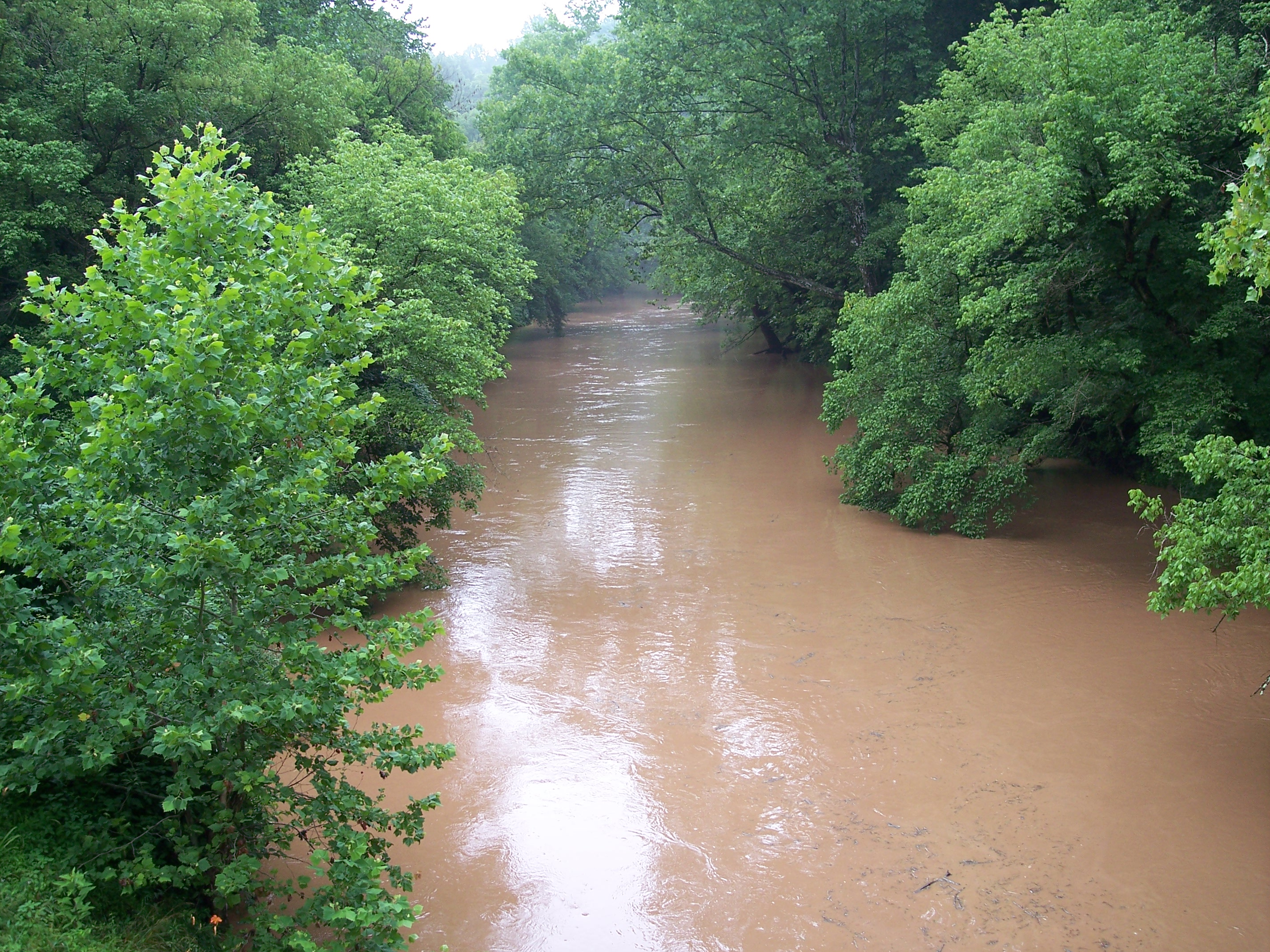
The North Fork of the Hughes River as viewed from the North Bend Rail Trail east of Cairo in 2006

The Hughes River is a tributary of the Little Kanawha River in western West Virginia in the United States. Via the Little Kanawha and Ohio Rivers, it is part of the watershed of the Mississippi River. As measured from the confluence of its north and south forks, the Hughes is 18 mi (29 km) long, and drains a rural area of the unglaciated portion of the Allegheny Plateau.

The river is believed to have been discovered and named by the 18th-century settler Jesse Hughes, but it may also have been named for others of the same surname residing in the area during roughly the same time period. According to the Geographic Names Information System, it has also been known historically as the Junius River.

== Course ==
The Hughes flows for most of its length through Ritchie County as two streams:

- The North Fork Hughes River, 57 mi (92 km) long, rises in northern Ritchie County near the community of Mountain, and flows generally southwestwardly, passing through North Bend State Park, and through the town of Cairo. It is crossed six times by the North Bend Rail Trail, which was a former line of the Baltimore and Ohio Railroad built between 1853 and 1857.
- The South Fork Hughes River, 54 mi (87 km) long, rises in western Doddridge County, and flows generally westwardly through southern Ritchie County, past the communities of Berea, Smithville, and Macfarlan. West Virginia Route 47 roughly parallels the south fork's lower course.

The Hughes' north and south forks join near the community of Cisco and the Hughes River then flows for 18 mi (29 km) through northern Wirt County and meets the Little Kanawha River near the community of Newark, 12 mi (19 km) southeast of Parkersburg.

Varieties of fish in the Hughes River include muskellunge; rock, smallmouth and spotted bass; flathead and channel catfish; and several species of sunfish.

== See also ==
- List of West Virginia rivers
