= North Bend Rail Trail =

Rail trail in West Virginia, United States

North Bend Rail Trail State Park
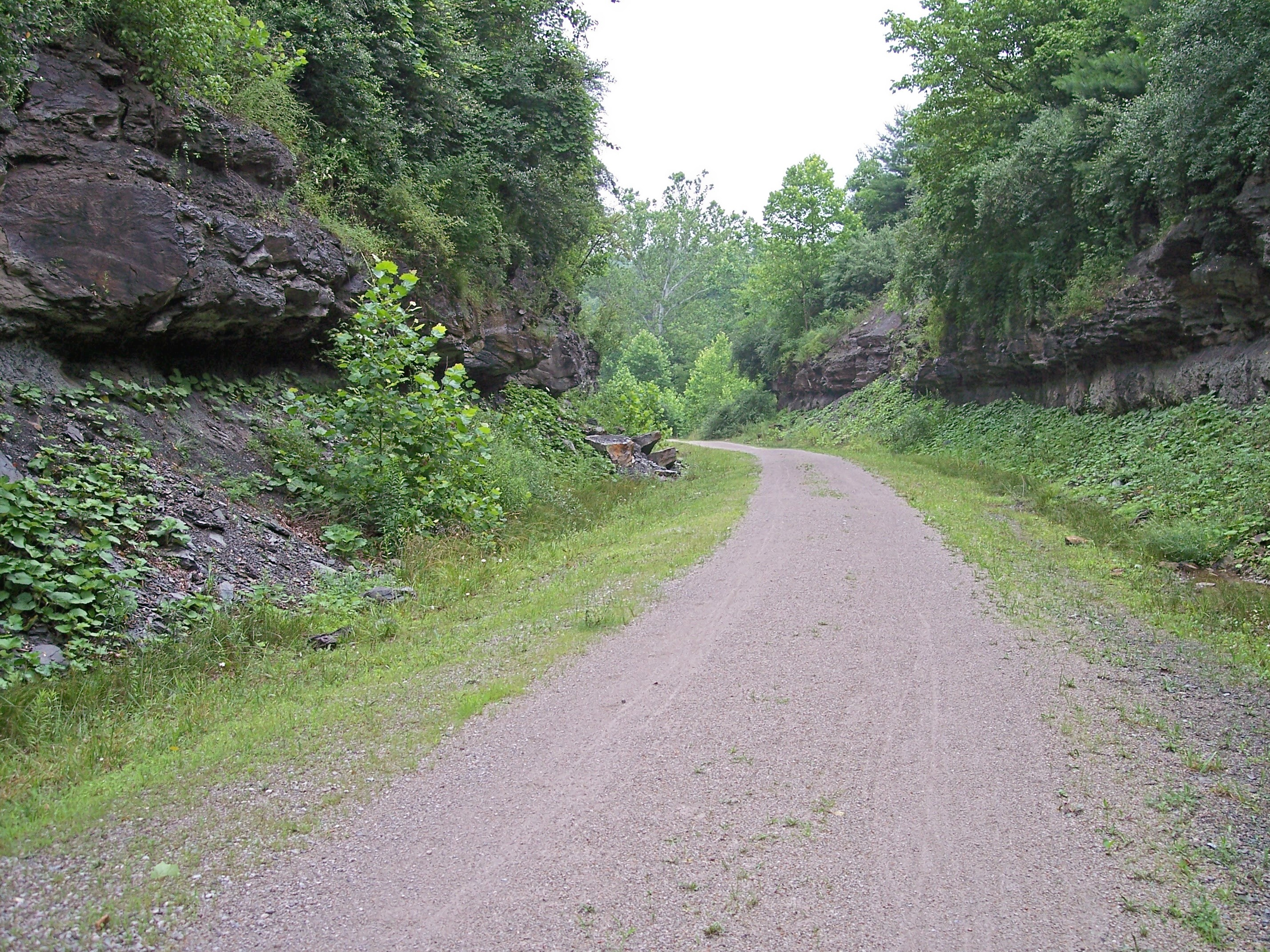
- North Bend Rail Trail east of Cairo, West Virginia

- Location within West Virginia
- Location: Doddridge, Harrison, Ritchie & Wood counties, West Virginia, U.S.
- Nearest city: Pennsboro, West Virginia, U.S.
- Coordinates: 39°17′06″N 80°58′14″W
- Length: 72 mi (116 km)
- Elevation: 856 ft (261 m)
- Designated: West Virginia State Park
- Governing body: West Virginia Division of Natural Resources
- Website: Official website

The North Bend Rail Trail is a 72-mile (116 km) rail trail in north-central and western West Virginia in the United States. It is operated by West Virginia State Parks and is part of the American Discovery Trail.

Running parallel to U.S. Route 50, the rail trail extends from the community of Wolf Summit west of Clarksburg at its eastern end to I-77 near Parkersburg at its western end, passing through Harrison, Doddridge, Ritchie and Wood Counties and the towns of Salem, West Union, Pennsboro, Ellenboro and Cairo, as well as North Bend State Park and numerous unincorporated communities.

== History ==
=== Railroad ===
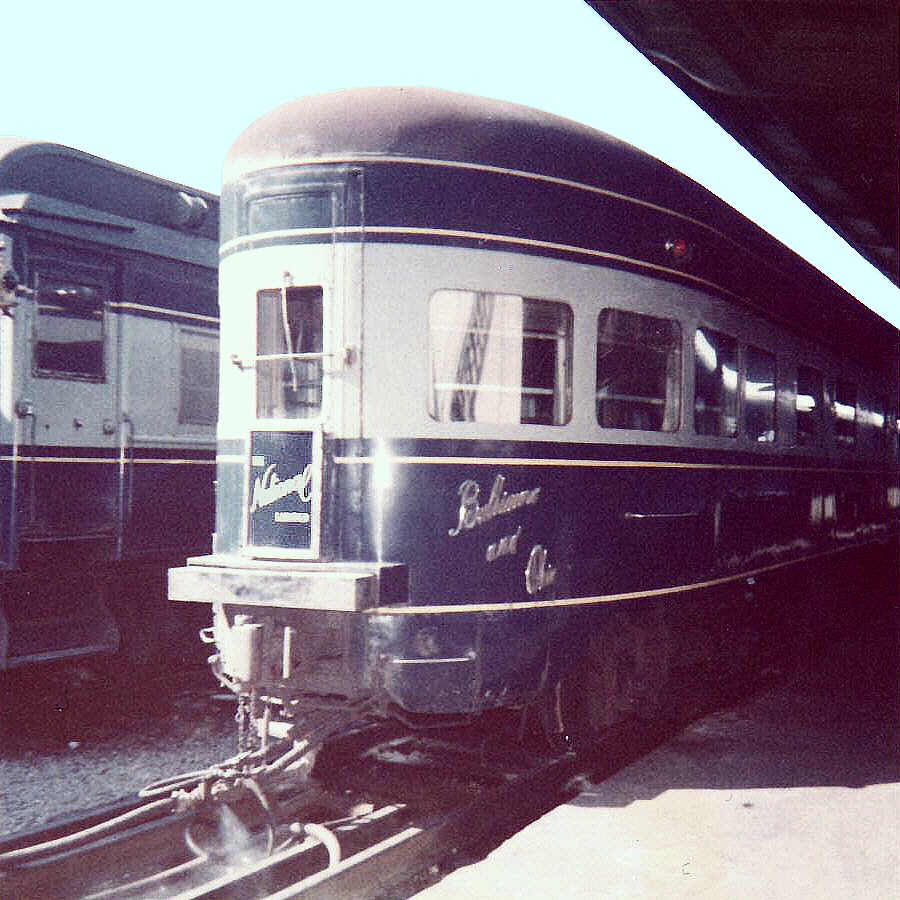
The B&O's premiere train, the National Limited, once traveled the route now occupied by the North Bend Rail Trail.

A CSX work train emerges from the east portal of the 1,086-foot tunnel No. 2 near Salem on September 9, 1988. Tracks are being removed west of the tunnel.

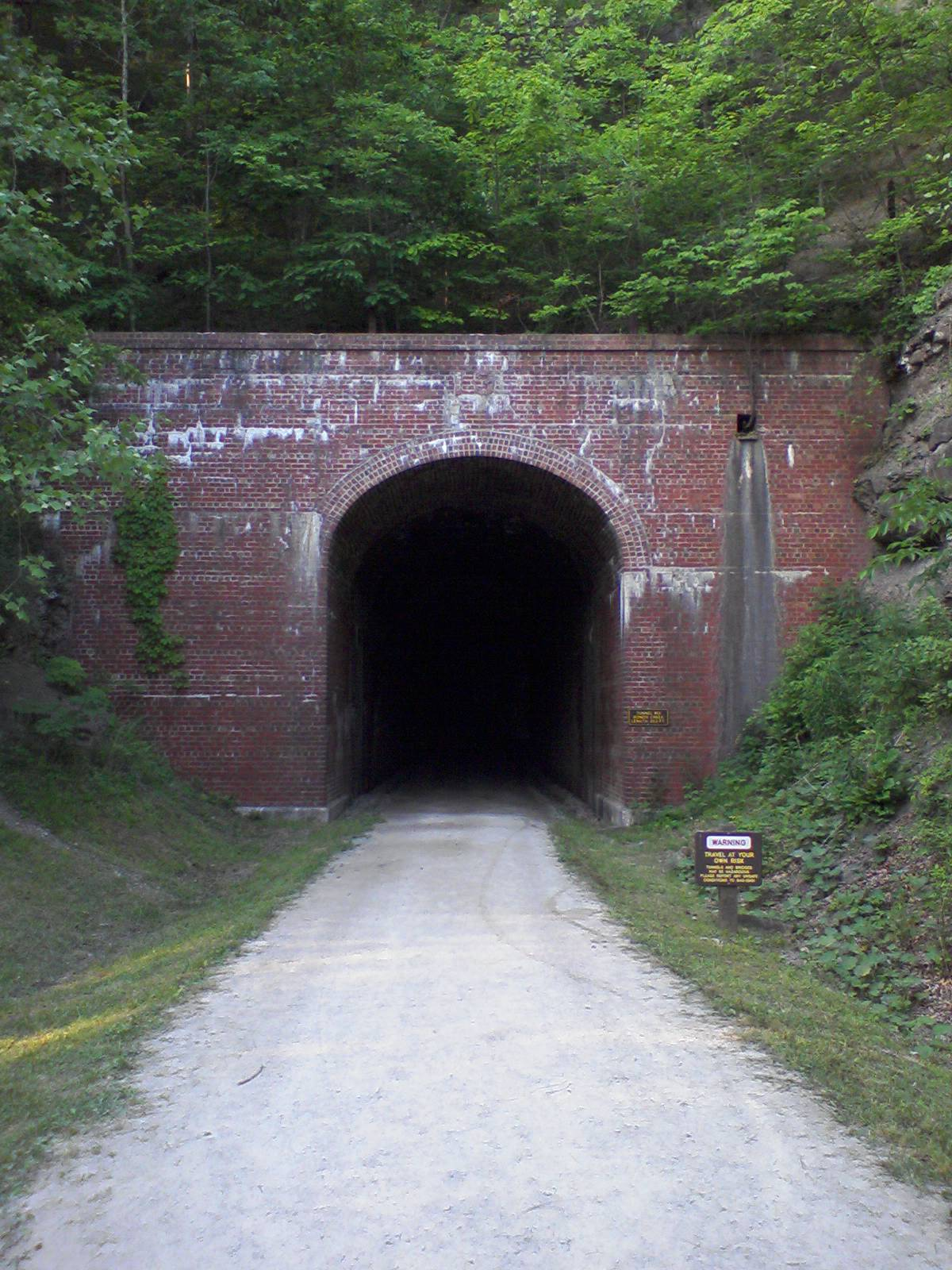
One of many tunnels along the North Bend Rail Trail.

The North Bend Rail Trail was built on one of the most distinguished railroad lines in U.S. history. Chartered in 1851, the Northwestern Virginia Railroad built 103 miles from the Baltimore and Ohio Railroad (B&O) mainline at Grafton, West Virginia, to the Ohio River at Parkersburg, West Virginia. The line was sold to the B&O upon completion on May 1, 1857 and became known as the B&O Parkersburg Branch.

The Parkersburg Branch was built to high engineering standards with 23 tunnels and 52 bridges to minimize curvature and offer a maximum grade of 1.5%. During its prime years, the branch hosted the Metropolitan, the Cincinnatian and National Limited, the B&O's premiere passenger train between New York City and St. Louis, Missouri. However, with the rise of automobile ownership, ridership declined and the B&O ceased passenger operations in 1971 with the formation of Amtrak.

After the Parkersburg Branch became part of the newly formed Chessie System in 1973, the mountainous route lost favor among railroad management. Amtrak, however, resurrected passenger trains in September 1971, though bypassed many of the sparsely populated towns along the line. Amtrak established the little-used West Virginian, which linked Washington, D.C. to Parkersburg, in response to pressure from U.S. Congressman Harley Orrin Staggers, who used his political status to continually push for improved transportation service throughout West Virginia. Ridership remained low and Amtrak rechristened the train the Potomac Special (derisively called the "Harley's Hornet" or "Staggers Special") before eliminating it in 1973. Beginning in October 1976, another Amtrak train, the Shenandoah, began utilizing the route, only to be discontinued in the fall of 1981 due to low ridership. Amtrak also rerouted the Capitol Limited over a B&O routing between Pittsburgh and Washington, a train originating in Chicago and continuing service to West Virginia communities east of Clarksburg, effectively bypassing the lightly used Parkersburg Branch.

By the time of Amtrak's retrenchment in 1981, local freight service was minimal. The Chessie System had already diverted long-distance freight trains to other routes and eliminated local service entirely by 1985. Two years later, the dormant Parkersburg Branch came under the stewardship of CSX Transportation, who abandoned the line between Walker and Wilsonburg and dismantled the tracks in September 1988.

=== Trail ===
CSX Transportation initially demanded $1.5 million from prospective buyers for the railroad corridor but eventually sold it to the state of West Virginia for approximately $320,000. The state gradually developed plans to convert the line into a recreational trail and incorporate it into their state park system. Initial trail segments opened in 1991, with additional portions added over several years, encompassing some 60 miles of former railroad that included 50 bridges and 12 tunnels. In 1996, the state purchased the western portion of the abandoned corridor between Walker and Parkersburg, totaling 72 miles.

Under the management of the state's Department of Natural Resources, the North Bend Rail Trail is a recreational trails through the Appalachians. It is revered for its mountainous scenery and tunnels, including the 1,086-foot tunnel No. 2 a short distance east of Salem.

== See also ==
- Ohio River Trail
- List of rail trails
- List of West Virginia state parks
