= Fonzo, West Virginia =

Unincorporated community in West Virginia, United States

Fonzo
- Unincorporated community
- Location within the state of West Virginia Fonzo (the United States)
- Coordinates: 39°4′23″N 81°3′5″W
- Country: United States
- State: West Virginia
- County: Ritchie
- Time zone: UTC-5 (Eastern (EST))
  - Summer (DST): UTC-4 (EDT)
- GNIS feature ID: 1549688

Fonzo is an unincorporated community in Ritchie County, West Virginia, United States. Fonzo was established in 1901. The community was named after a local baby.
