= Freeport, West Virginia =

Unincorporated community in West Virginia, United States

Freeport
- Unincorporated community
- Location within the state of West Virginia Freeport (the United States)
- Coordinates: 39°8′34″N 81°20′15″W
- Country: United States
- State: West Virginia
- County: Wirt
- Time zone: UTC-5 (Eastern (EST))
  - Summer (DST): UTC-4 (EDT)

Freeport is an unincorporated community in Wirt County, West Virginia, United States. It is located along Route 47 (Old Staunton Turnpike), approximately four miles east of the Wood County line and two miles west of the Ritchie County line. Its elevation is 607 feet (185m). The first post office (no longer standing) in the Clay District of Wirt County was established at the mouth of Goose Creek in Freeport around 1842, marking it as an early center of regional communication and settlement.

== Notable people ==
- Earl Shirkey, musician
