= Ritchie County Courthouse =

Courthouse in Harrisville, West Virginia, US

- U.S. National Register of Historic Places
- U.S. Historic district – Contributing property
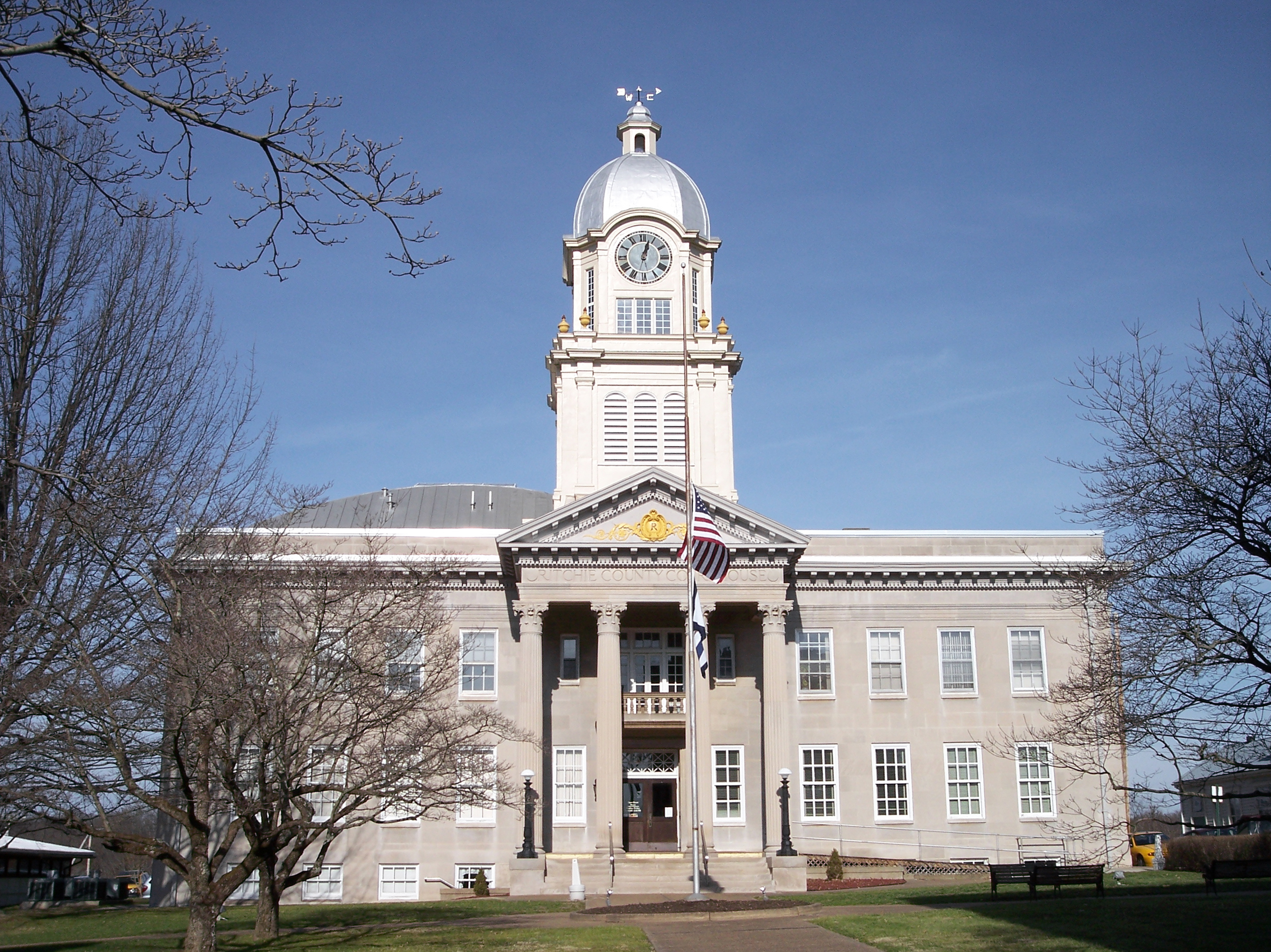

- Location within West Virginia Location within the United States
- Location: 115 E. Main St., Harrisville, West Virginia
- Coordinates: 39°12′36″N 81°3′6″W
- Built: 1923
- Built by: Forman & Putnam
- Architect: Holmboe & Pogue
- Architectural style: Classical Revival
- Part of: Harrisville Historic District (ID11000558)
- MPS: County Courthouses of West Virginia MPS
- NRHP reference No.: 04000916

Significant dates
- Added to NRHP: August 25, 2004
- Designated CP: August 18, 2011

The Ritchie County Courthouse in Harrisville, West Virginia, is a Neoclassical Revival building designed in 1923 by Clarksburg architects Holmboe & Pogue, and built by Forman & Putnam. It replaced an 1874 courthouse. The courthouse is relatively elaborate compared to its largely rural setting.

It was listed on the National Register of Historic Places in 2004. It is located in the Harrisville Historic District.
