= Cairo, West Virginia =

- Town
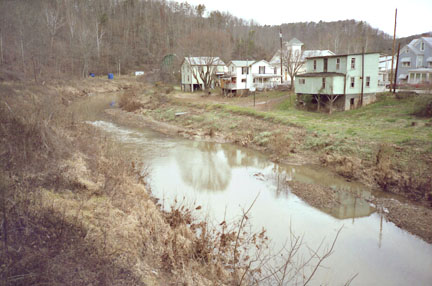
- The North Fork of the Hughes River at Cairo

- Location of Cairo in Ritchie County, West Virginia.
- Coordinates: 39°12′30″N 81°9′24″W
- Country: United States
- State: West Virginia
- County: Ritchie

Area
  - Total: 0.49 sq mi (1.26 km^{2})
  - Land: 0.47 sq mi (1.22 km^{2})
  - Water: 0.015 sq mi (0.04 km^{2})
- Elevation: 653 ft (199 m)

Population (2020)
  - Total: 176
  - Estimate (2021): 172
  - Density: 537.8/sq mi (207.65/km^{2})
- Time zone: UTC-5 (Eastern (EST))
  - Summer (DST): UTC-4 (EDT)
- ZIP code: 26337
- Area code: 304
- FIPS code: 54-12124
- GNIS feature ID: 1536852

Cairo (/ˈkɛəroʊ/ KAIR-oh) is a town in Ritchie County, West Virginia, United States, along West Virginia Route 31, the North Fork of the Hughes River, and the North Bend Rail Trail. The population was 174 at the 2020 census.

== History ==
The town was named by its earliest settlers, who were Scots Presbyterians, for the city of Cairo, Egypt, owing to the presence of water and fertile land at the site. Cairo was incorporated in 1895. The North Bend Rail Trail passes through the town.

The former Bank of Cairo building was listed on the National Register of Historic Places in 1996.

== Geography ==
Cairo is located at 39°12′30″N 81°9′24″W (39.208264, -81.156600).

According to the United States Census Bureau, the town has a total area of 0.48 square miles (1.24 km^{2}), of which 0.47 square miles (1.22 km^{2}) is land and 0.01 square miles (0.03 km^{2}) is water.

=== Climate ===
The climate in this area is characterized by hot, humid summers and generally mild to cool winters. According to the Köppen Climate Classification system, Cairo has a humid subtropical climate, abbreviated "Cfa" on climate maps.

== Demographics ==
Historical population
Census	Pop.	Note	%±
1880	75		—
1900	653		—
1910	668		2.3%
1920	662		−0.9%
1930	607		−8.3%
1940	532		−12.4%
1950	500		−6.0%
1960	418		−16.4%
1970	412		−1.4%
1980	428		3.9%
1990	290		−32.2%
2000	263		−9.3%
2010	281		6.8%
2020	176		−37.4%
2021 (est.)	172	▼	−2.3%
U.S. Decennial Census

=== 2010 census ===
At the 2010 census, there were 281 people, 118 households, and 71 families living in the town. The population density was 597.9 inhabitants per square mile (230.9/km^{2}). There were 151 housing units at an average density of 321.3 per square mile (124.1/km^{2}). The racial makeup of the town was 100.0% White. Of the 118 households, 28.8% had children under the age of 18 living with them, 49.2% were married couples living together, 6.8% had a female householder with no husband present, 4.2% had a male householder with no wife present, and 39.8% were non-families. 36.4% of households were one person and 12.7% were one person aged 65 or older. The average household size was 2.38 and the average family size was 3.13.

The median age in the town was 40.6 years. 23.5% of residents were under the age of 18; 10.6% were between the ages of 18 and 24; 20.3% were from 25 to 44; 30.9% were from 45 to 64; and 14.6% were 65 or older. The gender makeup of the town was 52.0% male and 48.0% female.

=== 2000 census ===
At the 2000 census there were 263 people, 112 households, and 73 families living in the town. The population density was 536.2 inhabitants per square mile (207.2/km^{2}). There were 140 housing units at an average density of 285.4 per square mile (110.3/km^{2}). The racial makeup of the town was 100.00% White. Of the 112 households 29.5% had children under the age of 18 living with them, 52.7% were married couples living together, 11.6% had a female householder with no husband present, and 34.8% were non-families. 30.4% of households were one person and 10.7% were one person aged 65 or older. The average household size was 2.35 and the average family size was 3.00.

The age distribution was 25.1% under the age of 18, 6.8% from 18 to 24, 27.8% from 25 to 44, 27.0% from 45 to 64, and 13.3% 65 or older. The median age was 41 years. For every 100 females, there were 85.2 males. For every 100 females age 18 and over, there were 89.4 males.

The median household income was $24,688 and the median family income was $29,792. Males had a median income of $20,833 versus $21,750 for females. The per capita income for the town was $14,958. About 9.5% of families and 14.0% of the population were below the poverty line, including 19.7% of those under the age of eighteen and 4.3% of those sixty five or over.
