= Harrisville, West Virginia =

- Town
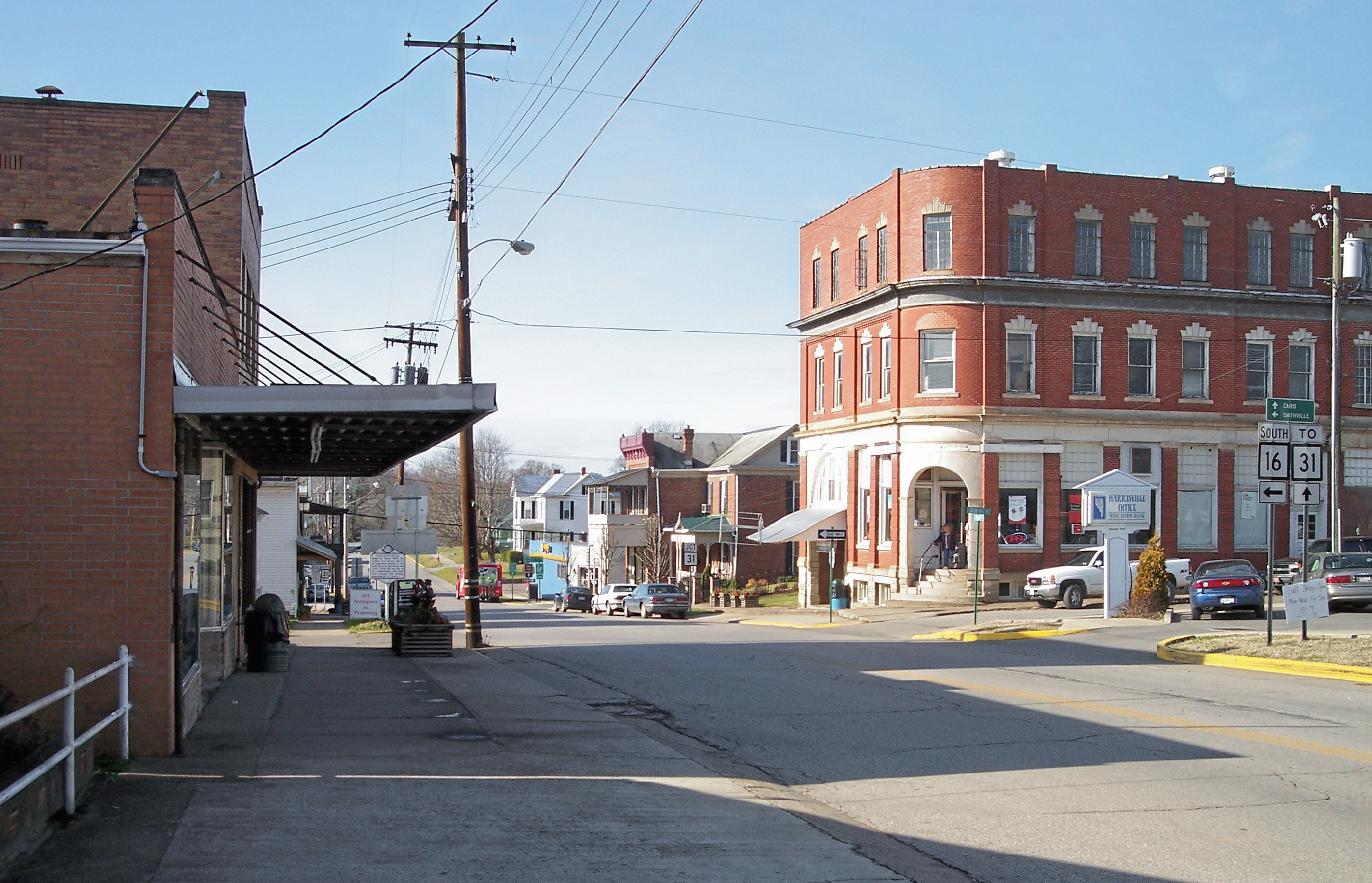
- Main Street in Harrisville in 2007

- Flag
- Interactive map of Harrisville, West Virginia
- Location within West Virginia Location within the United States
- Coordinates: 39°12′36″N 81°3′3″W
- Country: United States
- State: West Virginia
- County: Ritchie

Area
  - Total: 1.59 sq mi (4.13 km^{2})
  - Land: 1.58 sq mi (4.10 km^{2})
  - Water: 0.012 sq mi (0.03 km^{2})
- Elevation: 856 ft (261 m)

Population (2020)
  - Total: 1,631
  - Estimate (2021): 1,642
  - Density: 1,056.9/sq mi (408.08/km^{2})
- Time zone: UTC−5 (Eastern (EST))
  - Summer (DST): UTC−4 (EDT)
- ZIP Code: 26362
- Area code: 304
- FIPS code: 54-35428
- GNIS feature ID: 1540017
- Website: https://cityofharrisville.wixsite.com/mysite

Harrisville is a town and the county seat of Ritchie County, West Virginia, United States. As of the 2020 census, Harrisville had a population of 1,631. Harrisville is located at the junction of State Routes 31 and 16, five miles south of U.S. 50. Within the community are an elementary school, the county board of education, many businesses, three banks, a library, offices of the Ritchie Gazette and The Pennsboro News, a municipal park, and North Bend Golf Course. North Bend Lake and North Bend State Park are located just outside town limits. Municipal elections are held every two years.

== History ==
The town was laid out in 1822 by Thomas Harris, who had moved his family there in 1807. The town was chartered in 1832, and the first post office opened in 1833, under the name Solus. The name was later changed to Ritchie Court House, and then changed again to Harrisville in 1895, when the town was named for Gen. Thomas Harris, nephew of the founder. Ritchie County was formed in 1843, and the first courthouse was built in 1844. It was replaced by a brick structure in 1874. The present courthouse, a Harrisville landmark, was completed in late 1923.

The Pennsboro & Harrisville Railroad was built in 1875, operating between the two communities of its name. The broad-gauge Harrisville Southern Railroad ran to Cornwallis between about 1909 and 1929.

Harrisville High School was established on the west end of town in 1894. That structure now houses the General Thomas M. Harris School Museum. A new school built overlooking Harrisville in 1924 served as Harrisville High School until 1986. The same school building served as Ritchie County High School until it was closed in 1994. The school building was demolished on December 16, 2017. A small portion of the original school building remains and is the headquarters of “Ritchie Regional Health Center.” The Harrisville High School gym still remains and is now a community workout center using the name "The Gym," restored by the Harrisville First Assembly of God using funds generated from grants, memberships and donations.

General Harris, Harrisville's most distinguished citizen, died there in 1906. A medical doctor, Union officer and state adjutant general (1869–1871), he served on the military commission that tried the conspirators responsible for the assassination of Abraham Lincoln. His son, John T. Harris, long-time clerk of the state Senate, founded the West Virginia Blue Book in 1916. The Harrisville Historic District was listed on the National Register of Historic Places in 2011.

The Harrisville Historic District, Harrisville Grade School, and the Ritchie County Courthouse are listed on the National Register of Historic Places.

The town is home to historic Berdine's Five and Dime.

== Notable people ==
- Frank Deem (1928–2018), West Virginia state legislator and engineer, was born in Harrisville.
- Jim Pearcy (1918–2005), professional football player, was born in Harrisville.

== Geography ==
Harrisville is located at 39°12′36″N 81°3′3″W (39.209866, -81.050917).

According to the United States Census Bureau, the town has a total area of 1.59 square miles (4.12 km^{2}), of which 1.58 square miles (4.09 km^{2}) is land and 0.01 square miles (0.03 km^{2}) is water.

== Demographics ==
Historical population
Census	Pop.	Note	%±
1870	140		—
1880	221		57.9%
1890	361		63.3%
1900	472		30.7%
1910	608		28.8%
1920	1,036		70.4%
1930	1,192		15.1%
1940	1,338		12.2%
1950	1,387		3.7%
1960	1,428		3.0%
1970	1,464		2.5%
1980	1,673		14.3%
1990	1,839		9.9%
2000	1,842		0.2%
2010	1,876		1.8%
2020	1,631		−13.1%
2021 (est.)	1,642	▲	0.7%
U.S. Decennial Census

=== 2010 census ===
According to the 2010 census, there were 1,876 people, 787 households, and 496 families living in the town. The population density was 1,187.3 inhabitants per square mile (458.4/km^{2}). There were 917 housing units at an average density of 580.4 per square mile (224.1/km^{2}). The racial makeup of the town was 98.6% White, 0.3% African American, 0.1% Native American, 0.3% Asian, 0.2% from other races, and 0.6% from two or more races. Hispanic or Latino of any race were 0.7% of the population.

There were 787 households, of which 29.2% had children under the age of 18 living with them, 48.0% were married couples living together, 10.9% had a female householder with no husband present, 4.1% had a male householder with no wife present, and 37.0% were non-families. 32.9% of all households were made up of individuals, and 13.2% had someone living alone who was 65 years of age or older. The average household size was 2.25 and the average family size was 2.81.

The median age in the town was 44.8 years. 21.3% of residents were under the age of 18; 5.7% were between the ages of 18 and 24; 23.3% were from 25 to 44; 28.1% were from 45 to 64; and 21.6% were 65 years of age or older. The gender makeup of the town was 46.2% male and 53.8% female.

=== 2000 census ===
As of the census of 2000, there were 1,842 people, 780 households, and 516 families living in the town. The population density was 1,120.0 inhabitants per square mile (433.7/km^{2}). There were 889 housing units at an average density of 540.6 per square mile (209.3/km^{2}). The racial makeup of the town was 98.59% White, 0.05% African American, 0.05% Native American, 0.22% Asian, 0.33% from other races, and 0.76% from two or more races. Hispanic or Latino of any race were 0.76% of the population.

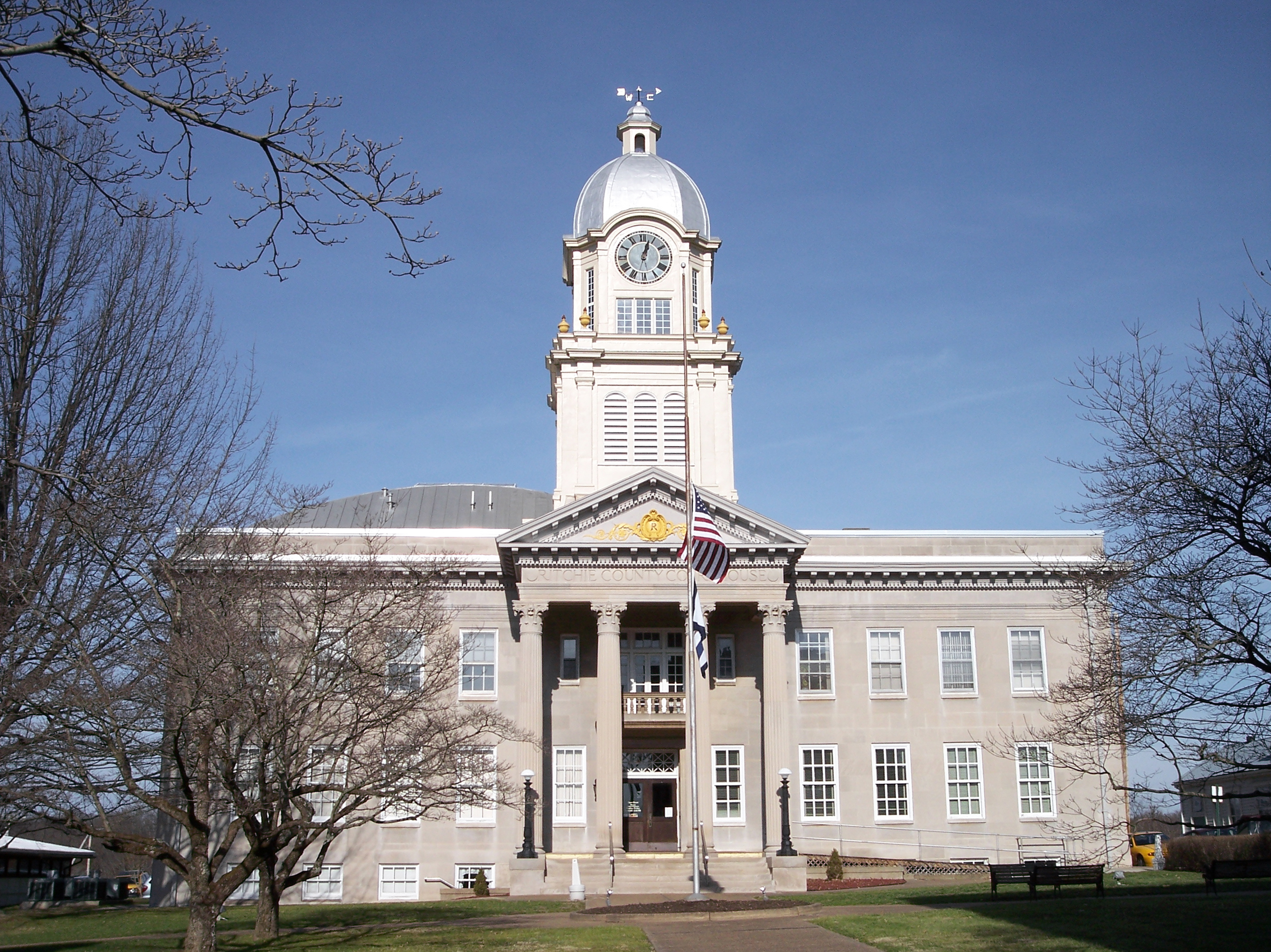
The Ritchie County Courthouse in Harrisville in 2007

There were 780 households, out of which 27.1% had children under the age of 18 living with them, 51.3% were married couples living together, 11.2% had a female householder with no husband present, and 33.8% were non-families. 30.6% of all households were made up of individuals, and 15.6% had someone living alone who was 65 years of age or older. The average household size was 2.26 and the average family size was 2.80.

In the town, the population was spread out, with 20.3% under the age of 18, 7.4% from 18 to 24, 29.3% from 25 to 44, 23.8% from 45 to 64, and 19.3% who were 65 years of age or older. The median age was 40 years. For every 100 females, there were 90.7 males. For every 100 females age 18 and over, there were 86.5 males.

The median income for a household in the town was $28,750, and the median income for a family was $38,083. Males had a median income of $27,200 versus $20,040 for females. The per capita income for the town was $15,158. About 17.5% of families and 22.4% of the population were below the poverty line, including 31.6% of those under age 18 and 15.2% of those age 65 or over.
