= Ritchie County, West Virginia =

County in West Virginia, United States

- County
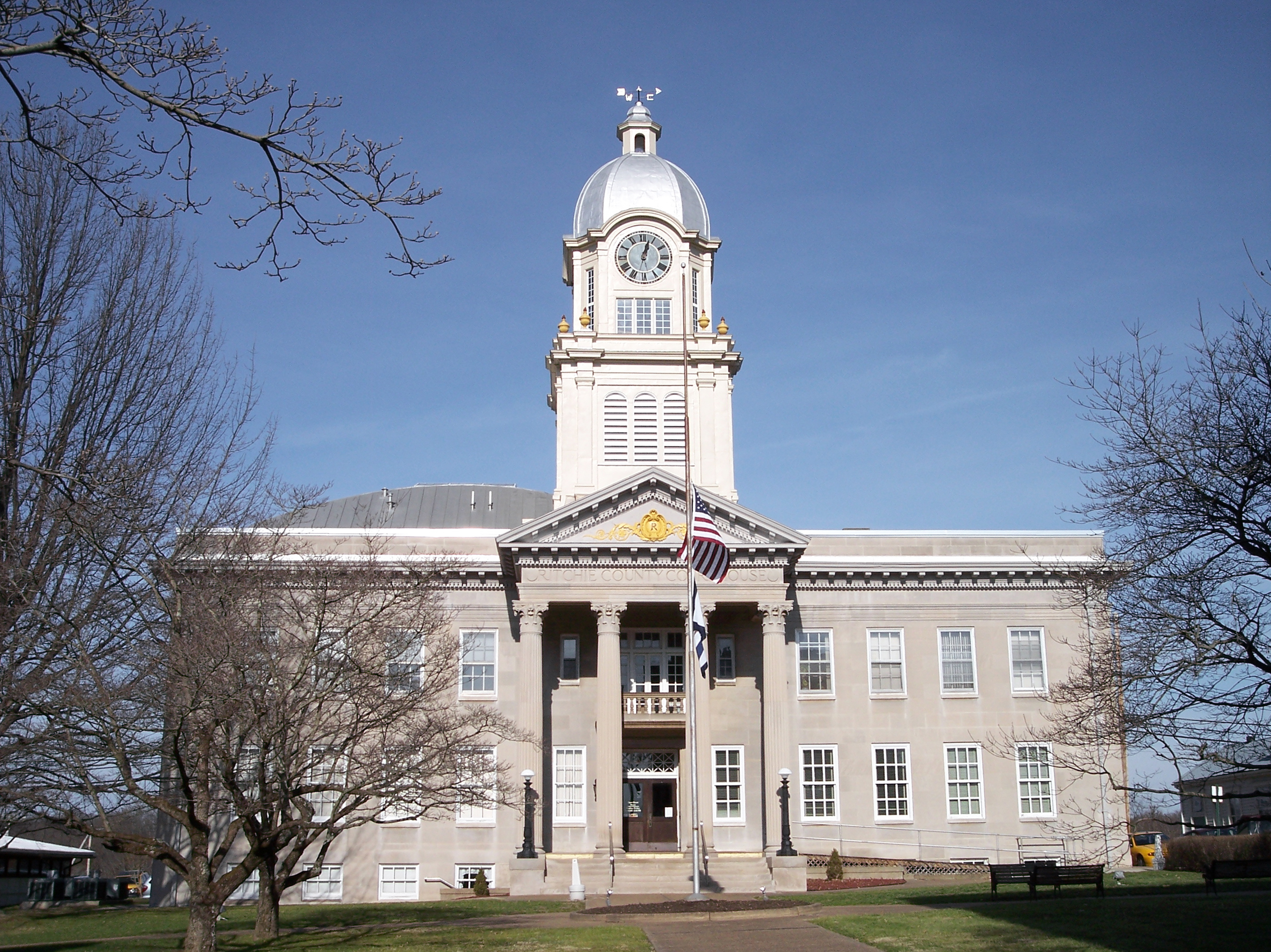
- Ritchie County Courthouse in Harrisville

- Location within the U.S. state of West Virginia
- Coordinates: 39°11′N 81°04′W
- Country: United States
- State: West Virginia
- Founded: February 18, 1843
- Named for: Thomas Ritchie
- Seat: Harrisville
- Largest town: Harrisville

Area
  - Total: 454 sq mi (1,180 km^{2})
  - Land: 452 sq mi (1,170 km^{2})
  - Water: 1.7 sq mi (4.4 km^{2}) 0.4%

Population (2020)
  - Total: 8,444
  - Estimate (2025): 8,034 ▼
  - Density: 18.7/sq mi (7.21/km^{2})
- Time zone: UTC−5 (Eastern)
  - Summer (DST): UTC−4 (EDT)
- Congressional district: 1st
- Website: www.ritchiecounty.wv.gov

Ritchie County is a county in the U.S. state of West Virginia. As of the 2020 census, the population was 8,444. Its county seat is Harrisville. The county was created in 1843 by the Virginia General Assembly and named for Richmond newspaper publisher Thomas Ritchie.

== History ==
Ritchie was one of fifty Virginia counties that were admitted to the Union as the state of West Virginia on June 20, 1863, at the height of the Civil War. Later that year, the new state's counties were divided into civil townships, with the intention of encouraging local government. This proved impractical in the heavily rural state, and in 1872 the townships were converted into magisterial districts. Ritchie County was divided into four districts: Clay, Grant, Murphy, and Union.

In 1911, historian Minnie Kendall Lowther published "The History of Ritchie County." Her book is still regarded as one of the most comprehensive histories of any county in West Virginia.

== Geography ==
According to the United States Census Bureau, the county has a total area of 454 square miles (1,180 km^{2}), of which 452 square miles (1,170 km^{2}) is land and 1.7 square miles (4.4 km^{2}) (0.4%) is water.

=== Waterways ===
The North Fork of the Hughes River runs directly through the town of Cairo, and also hosts North Bend Lake to the north west of Harrisville.

- Bee Run Stream
- Cow Run
- Little Indian Run

=== State Parks ===
- North Bend State Park

=== Major highways ===
- U.S. Route 50
- West Virginia Route 16
- West Virginia Route 31
- West Virginia Route 47
- West Virginia Route 74

=== Adjacent counties ===
- Pleasants County (north)
- Tyler County (northeast)
- Doddridge County (east)
- Gilmer County (southeast)
- Calhoun County (south)
- Wirt County (southwest)
- Wood County (northwest)

== Demographics ==
Historical population
Census	Pop.	Note	%±
1850	3,902		—
1860	6,847		75.5%
1870	9,055		32.2%
1880	13,474		48.8%
1890	16,621		23.4%
1900	18,901		13.7%
1910	17,875		−5.4%
1920	16,506		−7.7%
1930	15,594		−5.5%
1940	15,389		−1.3%
1950	12,535		−18.5%
1960	10,877		−13.2%
1970	10,145		−6.7%
1980	11,442		12.8%
1990	10,233		−10.6%
2000	10,343		1.1%
2010	10,449		1.0%
2020	8,444		−19.2%
2025 (est.)	8,034	▼	−4.9%
U.S. Decennial Census; 1790–1960 1900–1990; 1990–2000 2010–2020

=== 2020 census ===
As of the 2020 census, the county had a population of 8,444. Of the residents, 19.3% were under the age of 18 and 23.6% were 65 years of age or older; the median age was 48.6 years. For every 100 females there were 100.9 males, and for every 100 females age 18 and over there were 100.6 males.

The racial makeup of the county was 96.6% White, 0.2% Black or African American, 0.1% American Indian and Alaska Native, 0.3% Asian, 0.2% from some other race, and 2.5% from two or more races. Hispanic or Latino residents of any race comprised 0.9% of the population.

There were 3,631 households in the county, of which 25.3% had children under the age of 18 living with them and 22.7% had a female householder with no spouse or partner present. About 29.3% of all households were made up of individuals and 15.0% had someone living alone who was 65 years of age or older.

There were 4,142 housing units, of which 12.3% were vacant. Among occupied housing units, 81.0% were owner-occupied and 19.0% were renter-occupied. The homeowner vacancy rate was 1.3% and the rental vacancy rate was 10.3%.

Ritchie County, West Virginia – Racial and ethnic composition Note: the US Census treats Hispanic/Latino as an ethnic category. This table excludes Latinos from the racial categories and assigns them to a separate category. Hispanics/Latinos may be of any race.
Race / Ethnicity (NH = Non-Hispanic)	Pop 2000	Pop 2010	Pop 2020	% 2000	% 2010	% 2020
White alone (NH)	10,168	10,275	8,116	98.31%	98.33%	96.12%
Black or African American alone (NH)	14	20	16	0.14%	0.19%	0.19%
Native American or Alaska Native alone (NH)	28	11	6	0.27%	0.11%	0.07%
Asian alone (NH)	13	10	19	0.13%	0.10%	0.23%
Pacific Islander alone (NH)	0	0	7	0.00%	0.00%	0.08%
Other race alone (NH)	1	7	8	0.01%	0.07%	0.09%
Mixed race or Multiracial (NH)	70	71	192	0.68%	0.68%	2.27%
Hispanic or Latino (any race)	49	55	80	0.47%	0.53%	0.95%
Total	10,343	10,449	8,444	100.00%	100.00%	100.00%

=== 2010 census ===
As of the 2010 United States census, there were 10,449 people, 4,367 households, and 2,960 families living in the county. The population density was 23.1 inhabitants per square mile (8.9/km^{2}). There were 5,843 housing units at an average density of 12.9 units per square mile (5.0 units/km^{2}). The racial makeup of the county was 98.7% white, 0.2% black or African American, 0.1% Asian, 0.1% American Indian, 0.2% from other races, and 0.8% from two or more races. Those of Hispanic or Latino origin made up 0.5% of the population. In terms of ancestry, 20.3% were German, 14.6% were Irish, 13.2% were American, and 11.3% were English.

Of the 4,367 households, 28.2% had children under the age of 18 living with them, 53.2% were married couples living together, 9.8% had a female householder with no husband present, 32.2% were non-families, and 28.2% of all households were made up of individuals. The average household size was 2.37 and the average family size was 2.85. The median age was 44.3 years.

The median income for a household in the county was $32,619 and the median income for a family was $39,919. Males had a median income of $31,807 versus $23,966 for females. The per capita income for the county was $18,255. About 13.9% of families and 18.9% of the population were below the poverty line, including 21.6% of those under age 18 and 15.2% of those age 65 or over.

=== 2000 census ===
As of the census of 2000, there were 10,343 people, 4,184 households, and 2,999 families living in the county. The population density was 23 people per square mile (8.9 people/km^{2}). There were 5,513 housing units at an average density of 12 units per square mile (4.6 units/km^{2}). The racial makeup of the county was 98.68% White, 0.14% Black or African American, 0.27% Native American, 0.13% Asian, 0.11% from other races, and 0.69% from two or more races. 0.47% of the population were Hispanic or Latino of any race.

There were 4,184 households, out of which 30.20% had children under the age of 18 living with them, 58.20% were married couples living together, 9.70% had a female householder with no husband present, and 28.30% were non-families. 25.00% of all households were made up of individuals, and 12.30% had someone living alone who was 65 years of age or older. The average household size was 2.45 and the average family size was 2.91.

In the county, the population was spread out, with 23.00% under the age of 18, 7.70% from 18 to 24, 28.00% from 25 to 44, 26.10% from 45 to 64, and 15.20% who were 65 years of age or older. The median age was 40 years. For every 100 females there were 96.20 males. For every 100 females age 18 and over, there were 95.10 males.

The median income for a household in the county was $27,332, and the median income for a family was $34,809. Males had a median income of $28,147 versus $18,149 for females. The per capita income for the county was $15,175. About 14.30% of families and 19.10% of the population were below the poverty line, including 23.60% of those under age 18 and 14.10% of those age 65 or over.

== Politics ==
After having leaned strongly towards the Democratic Party between the New Deal and Bill Clinton's presidency, most of West Virginia has since 2000 seen an extremely rapid swing towards the Republican Party due to declining unionization along with views on environmental, social and cultural issues increasingly at odds with the national Democratic party. In contrast, Ritchie County along with neighbouring Doddridge County and Tyler County were historically powerfully Unionist and have always been solidly Republican since the Civil War. Only one Democratic presidential nominee has carried Ritchie County since West Virginia's statehood: Woodrow Wilson in 1912, and he won by a mere six votes with only 34.22 percent of all votes against a Republican Party mortally divided between conservative incumbent Taft and progressive Theodore Roosevelt.

United States presidential election results for Ritchie County, West Virginia
Year	Republican		Democratic		Third party(ies)	
Year	No.	%	No.	%	No.	%
1912	937	26.31%	1,270	35.65%	1,355	38.04%
1916	2,225	56.03%	1,657	41.73%	89	2.24%
1920	4,377	67.39%	2,050	31.56%	68	1.05%
1924	4,152	62.61%	2,403	36.23%	77	1.16%
1928	4,195	70.40%	1,711	28.71%	53	0.89%
1932	4,055	55.42%	3,179	43.45%	83	1.13%
1936	4,639	61.97%	2,825	37.74%	22	0.29%
1940	4,982	67.13%	2,439	32.87%	0	0.00%
1944	3,963	70.60%	1,650	29.40%	0	0.00%
1948	3,619	67.71%	1,712	32.03%	14	0.26%
1952	4,238	71.79%	1,665	28.21%	0	0.00%
1956	4,140	73.78%	1,471	26.22%	0	0.00%
1960	3,972	71.40%	1,591	28.60%	0	0.00%
1964	2,717	54.77%	2,244	45.23%	0	0.00%
1968	3,106	66.50%	1,281	27.42%	284	6.08%
1972	3,635	78.59%	990	21.41%	0	0.00%
1976	2,874	59.69%	1,941	40.31%	0	0.00%
1980	3,081	65.68%	1,450	30.91%	160	3.41%
1984	3,355	72.79%	1,231	26.71%	23	0.50%
1988	2,874	66.25%	1,446	33.33%	18	0.41%
1992	2,184	49.46%	1,474	33.38%	758	17.16%
1996	1,906	49.75%	1,385	36.15%	540	14.10%
2000	2,717	71.27%	1,024	26.86%	71	1.86%
2004	3,086	73.55%	1,070	25.50%	40	0.95%
2008	2,781	72.31%	998	25.95%	67	1.74%
2012	2,921	77.07%	768	20.26%	101	2.66%
2016	3,405	82.95%	496	12.08%	204	4.97%
2020	3,649	85.20%	586	13.68%	48	1.12%
2024	3,473	85.75%	517	12.77%	60	1.48%

== Notable sights ==
- Historic Berdine's Five and Dime
- North Bend State Park
- North Bend Rail Trail
- The Double Scoop Ice Cream Parlor Cairo, WV
- Pine Hill Pottery
- Sunny Hollow Farms
- Old Stone House Museum

== Communities ==
=== City ===
- Pennsboro

=== Towns ===
- Auburn
- Cairo
- Ellenboro
- Harrisville (county seat)
- Pullman

=== Magisterial districts ===
- Clay
- Grant
- Murphy
- Union

=== Unincorporated communities ===
- Berea
- Brohard
- Burnt House
- Fonzo
- Macfarlan
- Petroleum
- Smithville
