= 1952 United States presidential election in West Virginia =

- November 4, 1952

All 8 West Virginia votes to the Electoral College

Nominee	Adlai Stevenson	Dwight D. Eisenhower
Party	Democratic	Republican
Home state	Illinois	New York
Running mate	John Sparkman	Richard Nixon
Electoral vote	8	0
Popular vote	453,578	419,970
Percentage	51.92%	48.08%
County results
Stevenson
50–60%
60–70%
70–80%
Eisenhower
50–60%
60–70%
70–80%
80–90%
President before election
Harry S. Truman
Democratic
Elected President
Dwight D. Eisenhower
Republican

The 1952 United States presidential election in West Virginia took place on November 4, 1952, as part of the 1952 United States presidential election. West Virginia voters chose eight representatives, or electors, to the Electoral College, who voted for president and vice president.

West Virginia was won by Adlai Stevenson (D–Illinois), running with Senator John Sparkman, with 51.92 percent of the popular vote, against Columbia University President Dwight D. Eisenhower (R–New York), running with California Senator Richard Nixon, with 48.08 percent of the popular vote.

Even in the midst of a national landslide for Eisenhower, this was the first time a losing Democrat carried West Virginia since 1888, and the first time a Democrat who lost the popular vote carried West Virginia since 1880. West Virginia's Democratic tilt displayed the strong Democratic lean the state would have for the rest of the 20th century, voting Republican only three times between 1932 and 1996 (in the Republican landslides of 1956, 1972, and 1984).

West Virginia and Kentucky were the only states outside of the former Confederacy (though Kentucky also had a Confederate government that controlled half the state early on) carried by the Democratic Party in 1952.

== Results ==
1952 United States presidential election in West Virginia
Party	Candidate	Votes	%
Democratic	Adlai Stevenson	453,578	51.92%
Republican	Dwight D. Eisenhower	419,970	48.08%
Total votes		873,548	100.00%

=== Results by county ===
County	Adlai Stevenson Democratic		Dwight D. Eisenhower Republican		Margin		Total votes cast
County	#	%	#	%	#	%	Total votes cast
Barbour	4,489	49.92%	4,504	50.08%	-15	-0.16%	8,993
Berkeley	7,111	46.60%	8,149	53.40%	-1,038	-6.80%	15,260
Boone	8,209	66.69%	4,100	33.31%	4,109	33.38%	12,309
Braxton	4,259	55.74%	3,382	44.26%	877	11.48%	7,641
Brooke	7,591	59.94%	5,073	40.06%	2,518	19.88%	12,664
Cabell	22,179	44.68%	27,461	55.32%	-5,282	-10.64%	49,640
Calhoun	2,138	50.44%	2,101	49.56%	37	0.88%	4,239
Clay	2,814	52.62%	2,534	47.38%	280	5.24%	5,348
Doddridge	1,040	27.51%	2,741	72.49%	-1,701	-44.98%	3,781
Fayette	22,307	70.82%	9,190	29.18%	13,117	41.64%	31,497
Gilmer	2,291	55.82%	1,813	44.18%	478	11.64%	4,104
Grant	674	17.04%	3,282	82.96%	-2,608	-65.92%	3,956
Greenbrier	8,086	52.30%	7,374	47.70%	712	4.60%	15,460
Hampshire	2,391	52.39%	2,173	47.61%	218	4.78%	4,564
Hancock	9,772	59.98%	6,520	40.02%	3,252	19.96%	16,292
Hardy	2,411	54.20%	2,037	45.80%	374	8.40%	4,448
Harrison	20,527	49.20%	21,193	50.80%	-666	-1.60%	41,720
Jackson	2,597	34.90%	4,845	65.10%	-2,248	-30.20%	7,442
Jefferson	4,036	56.29%	3,134	43.71%	902	12.58%	7,170
Kanawha	54,540	48.96%	56,861	51.04%	-2,321	-2.08%	111,401
Lewis	3,280	34.40%	6,254	65.60%	-2,974	-31.20%	9,534
Lincoln	5,099	51.59%	4,784	48.41%	315	3.18%	9,883
Logan	19,302	67.85%	9,148	32.15%	10,154	35.70%	28,450
Marion	19,890	57.04%	14,979	42.96%	4,911	14.08%	34,869
Marshall	8,689	48.38%	9,271	51.62%	-582	-3.24%	17,960
Mason	3,824	38.53%	6,102	61.47%	-2,278	-22.94%	9,926
McDowell	24,657	69.81%	10,663	30.19%	13,994	39.62%	35,320
Mercer	16,694	53.92%	14,267	46.08%	2,427	7.84%	30,961
Mineral	4,545	44.81%	5,598	55.19%	-1,053	-10.38%	10,143
Mingo	12,856	65.23%	6,852	34.77%	6,004	30.46%	19,708
Monongalia	13,152	50.08%	13,111	49.92%	41	0.16%	26,263
Monroe	2,856	45.31%	3,447	54.69%	-591	-9.38%	6,303
Morgan	1,114	29.22%	2,699	70.78%	-1,585	-41.56%	3,813
Nicholas	5,615	56.14%	4,386	43.86%	1,229	12.28%	10,001
Ohio	16,546	44.57%	20,575	55.43%	-4,029	-10.86%	37,121
Pendleton	1,991	51.71%	1,859	48.29%	132	3.42%	3,850
Pleasants	1,632	46.21%	1,900	53.79%	-268	-7.58%	3,532
Pocahontas	2,743	49.12%	2,841	50.88%	-98	-1.76%	5,584
Preston	4,278	34.68%	8,059	65.32%	-3,781	-30.64%	12,337
Putnam	4,802	49.27%	4,944	50.73%	-142	-1.46%	9,746
Raleigh	22,704	61.85%	14,005	38.15%	8,699	23.70%	36,709
Randolph	6,976	56.13%	5,452	43.87%	1,524	12.26%	12,428
Ritchie	1,665	28.21%	4,238	71.79%	-2,573	-43.58%	5,903
Roane	3,603	42.26%	4,922	57.74%	-1,319	-15.48%	8,525
Summers	4,463	56.07%	3,496	43.93%	967	12.14%	7,959
Taylor	3,752	44.33%	4,711	55.67%	-959	-11.34%	8,463
Tucker	2,577	53.55%	2,235	46.45%	342	7.10%	4,812
Tyler	1,523	30.39%	3,488	69.61%	-1,965	-39.22%	5,011
Upshur	2,234	27.34%	5,938	72.66%	-3,704	-45.32%	8,172
Wayne	8,679	55.15%	7,059	44.85%	1,620	10.30%	15,738
Webster	3,767	62.83%	2,229	37.17%	1,538	25.66%	5,996
Wetzel	4,375	49.43%	4,476	50.57%	-101	-1.14%	8,851
Wirt	1,050	41.60%	1,474	58.40%	-424	-16.80%	2,524
Wood	14,154	41.54%	19,917	58.46%	-5,763	-16.92%	34,071
Wyoming	9,029	59.59%	6,124	40.41%	2,905	19.18%	15,153
Totals	453,578	51.92%	419,970	48.08%	33,608	3.84%	873,548

==== Counties that flipped from Democratic to Republican ====
- Barbour
- Berkeley
- Cabell
- Harrison
- Kanawha
- Marshall
- Mineral
- Ohio
- Pocahontas
- Putnam
- Wetzel
- Wood

== See also ==
- United States presidential elections in West Virginia
