= 1920 United States presidential election in West Virginia =

- November 2, 1920
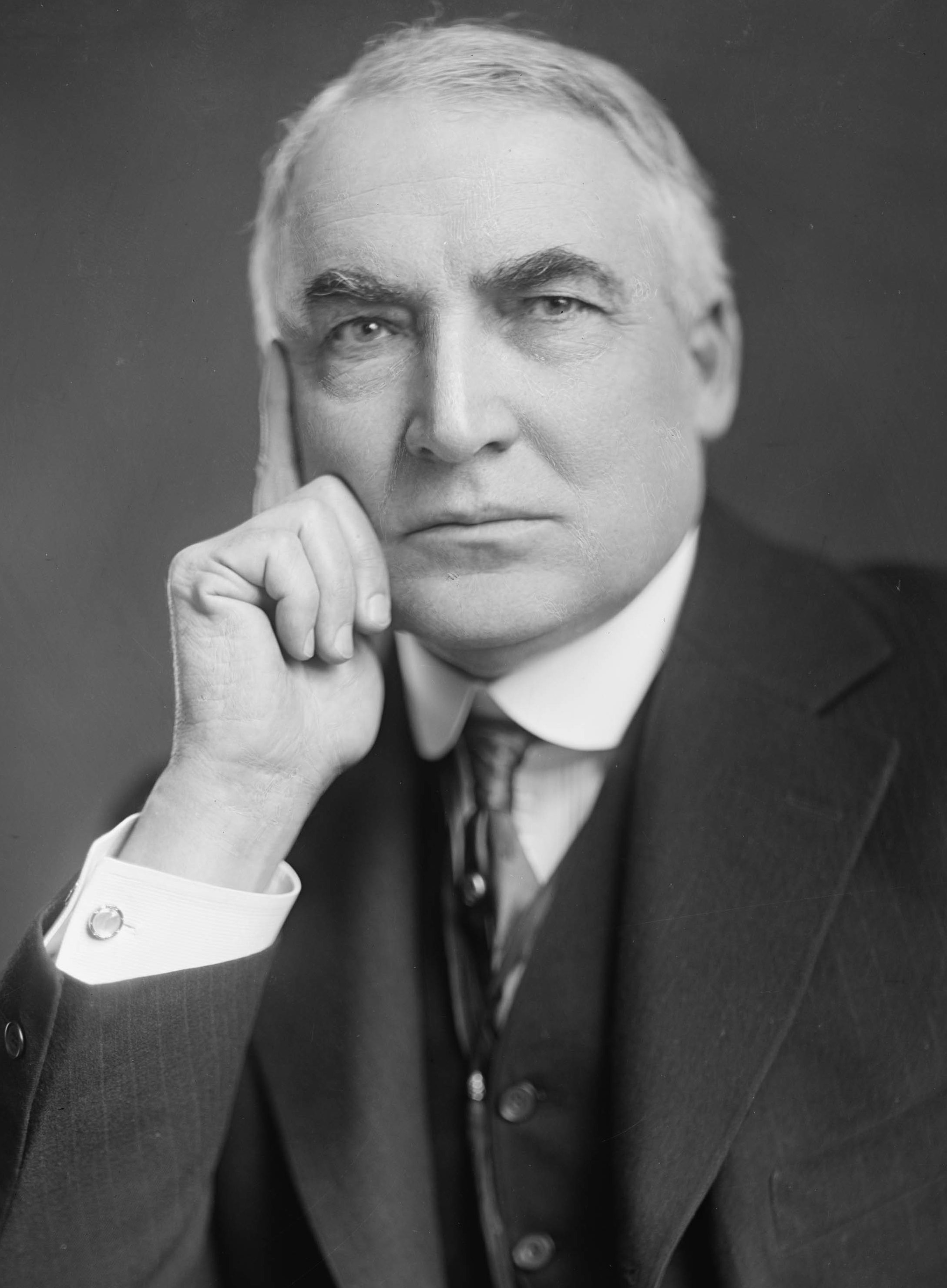

| Nominee | Warren G. Harding | James M. Cox |
| Party | Republican | Democratic |
| Home state | Ohio | Ohio |
| Running mate | Calvin Coolidge | Franklin D. Roosevelt |
| Electoral vote | 8 | 0 |
| Popular vote | 282,007 | 220,789 |
| Percentage | 55.30% | 43.30% |
County results
Harding
40–50%
50–60%
60–70%
70–80%
80–90%
Cox
50–60%
60–70%
President before election
Woodrow Wilson
Democratic
Elected President
Warren G. Harding
Republican

The 1920 United States presidential election in West Virginia took place on November 2, 1920, as part of the 1920 United States presidential election which was held throughout all contemporary 48 states. Voters chose eight representatives, or electors to the Electoral College, who voted for president and vice president.

West Virginia voted for the Republican nominee, Ohio Senator Warren G. Harding, over the Democratic nominee, Ohio Governor James M. Cox. Harding ran with Massachusetts Governor Calvin Coolidge, while Cox ran with Assistant Secretary of the Navy Franklin D. Roosevelt of New York.

Harding won the state by a margin of 12 percent, becoming the first ever Republican victor in Summers County, the first in Braxton County since Ulysses S. Grant in 1868, and the last until Richard Nixon in 1972 in both Braxton and Boone Counties.

== Results ==
1920 United States presidential election in West Virginia
| Party | Candidate | Votes | Percentage | Electoral votes |
|---|---|---|---|---|
| Republican | Warren G. Harding | 282,007 | 55.30% | 8 |
| Democratic | James M. Cox | 220,789 | 43.30% | 0 |
| Socialist | Eugene V. Debs | 5,618 | 1.10% | 0 |
| Prohibition | Aaron S. Watkins | 1,528 | 0.30% | 0 |
| Totals | | 509,942 | 100.00% | 8 |

=== Results by county ===
1920 United States presidential election in West Virginia by county
| County | Warren G. Harding Republican | | James M. Cox Democratic | | Eugene V. Debs Socialist | | Aaron S. Watkins Prohibition | | Margin | | Total votes cast |
| County | # | % | # | % | # | % | # | % | # | % | Total votes cast |
|---|---|---|---|---|---|---|---|---|---|---|---|
| Barbour | 3,763 | 56.58% | 2,777 | 41.75% | 94 | 1.41% | 17 | 0.26% | 986 | 14.82% | 6,651 |
| Berkeley | 5,259 | 53.95% | 4,399 | 45.13% | 60 | 0.62% | 30 | 0.31% | 860 | 8.82% | 9,748 |
| Boone | 2,674 | 50.31% | 2,529 | 47.58% | 108 | 2.03% | 4 | 0.08% | 145 | 2.73% | 5,315 |
| Braxton | 4,274 | 49.91% | 4,269 | 49.85% | 10 | 0.12% | 10 | 0.12% | 5 | 0.06% | 8,563 |
| Brooke | 3,060 | 57.36% | 2,129 | 39.91% | 104 | 1.95% | 42 | 0.79% | 931 | 17.45% | 5,335 |
| Cabell | 13,170 | 50.80% | 12,485 | 48.16% | 204 | 0.79% | 64 | 0.25% | 685 | 2.64% | 25,923 |
| Calhoun | 1,671 | 48.48% | 1,773 | 51.44% | 2 | 0.06% | 1 | 0.03% | -102 | -2.96% | 3,447 |
| Clay | 1,981 | 56.37% | 1,533 | 43.63% | 0 | 0.00% | 0 | 0.00% | 448 | 12.75% | 3,514 |
| Doddridge | 3,135 | 72.96% | 1,137 | 26.46% | 12 | 0.28% | 13 | 0.30% | 1,998 | 46.50% | 4,297 |
| Fayette | 10,561 | 52.98% | 9,003 | 45.16% | 340 | 1.71% | 30 | 0.15% | 1,558 | 7.82% | 19,934 |
| Gilmer | 1,635 | 46.58% | 1,854 | 52.82% | 6 | 0.17% | 15 | 0.43% | -219 | -6.24% | 3,510 |
| Grant | 2,417 | 82.15% | 492 | 16.72% | 26 | 0.88% | 7 | 0.24% | 1,925 | 65.43% | 2,942 |
| Greenbrier | 4,850 | 48.99% | 4,994 | 50.45% | 55 | 0.56% | 0 | 0.00% | -144 | -1.45% | 9,899 |
| Hampshire | 1,214 | 35.02% | 2,221 | 64.06% | 10 | 0.29% | 22 | 0.63% | -1,007 | -29.05% | 3,467 |
| Hancock | 2,768 | 63.43% | 1,435 | 32.88% | 101 | 2.31% | 60 | 1.37% | 1,333 | 30.55% | 4,364 |
| Hardy | 1,354 | 40.12% | 2,014 | 59.67% | 6 | 0.18% | 1 | 0.03% | -660 | -19.56% | 3,375 |
| Harrison | 13,784 | 55.67% | 10,206 | 41.22% | 620 | 2.50% | 149 | 0.60% | 3,578 | 14.45% | 24,759 |
| Jackson | 4,330 | 60.30% | 2,831 | 39.42% | 18 | 0.25% | 2 | 0.03% | 1,499 | 20.87% | 7,181 |
| Jefferson | 2,168 | 35.27% | 3,944 | 64.16% | 29 | 0.47% | 6 | 0.10% | -1,776 | -28.89% | 6,147 |
| Kanawha | 23,781 | 54.33% | 19,284 | 44.06% | 627 | 1.43% | 77 | 0.18% | 4,497 | 10.27% | 43,769 |
| Lewis | 4,618 | 57.14% | 3,310 | 40.96% | 109 | 1.35% | 45 | 0.56% | 1,308 | 16.18% | 8,082 |
| Lincoln | 3,339 | 55.58% | 2,649 | 44.09% | 19 | 0.32% | 1 | 0.02% | 690 | 11.48% | 6,008 |
| Logan | 4,304 | 43.32% | 5,588 | 56.24% | 27 | 0.27% | 17 | 0.17% | -1,284 | -12.92% | 9,936 |
| Marion | 11,494 | 55.23% | 8,734 | 41.97% | 408 | 1.96% | 175 | 0.84% | 2,760 | 13.26% | 20,811 |
| Marshall | 7,208 | 58.22% | 4,814 | 38.89% | 259 | 2.09% | 99 | 0.80% | 2,394 | 19.34% | 12,380 |
| Mason | 4,912 | 59.88% | 3,177 | 38.73% | 101 | 1.23% | 13 | 0.16% | 1,735 | 21.15% | 8,203 |
| McDowell | 12,198 | 70.58% | 5,068 | 29.33% | 16 | 0.09% | 0 | 0.00% | 7,130 | 41.26% | 17,282 |
| Mercer | 8,613 | 51.73% | 7,981 | 47.93% | 38 | 0.23% | 18 | 0.11% | 632 | 3.80% | 16,650 |
| Mineral | 3,646 | 57.90% | 2,516 | 39.96% | 99 | 1.57% | 36 | 0.57% | 1,130 | 17.95% | 6,297 |
| Mingo | 3,972 | 44.60% | 4,934 | 55.40% | 0 | 0.00% | 0 | 0.00% | -962 | -10.80% | 8,906 |
| Monongalia | 6,773 | 63.99% | 3,442 | 32.52% | 284 | 2.68% | 85 | 0.80% | 3,331 | 31.47% | 10,584 |
| Monroe | 3,001 | 54.25% | 2,519 | 45.54% | 8 | 0.14% | 4 | 0.07% | 482 | 8.71% | 5,532 |
| Morgan | 1,817 | 71.48% | 712 | 28.01% | 13 | 0.51% | 0 | 0.00% | 1,105 | 43.47% | 2,542 |
| Nicholas | 3,691 | 50.53% | 3,564 | 48.79% | 27 | 0.37% | 23 | 0.31% | 127 | 1.74% | 7,305 |
| Ohio | 15,735 | 58.62% | 10,278 | 38.29% | 746 | 2.78% | 83 | 0.31% | 5,457 | 20.33% | 26,842 |
| Pendleton | 1,581 | 46.51% | 1,814 | 53.37% | 4 | 0.12% | 0 | 0.00% | -233 | -6.85% | 3,399 |
| Pleasants | 1,657 | 52.91% | 1,449 | 46.26% | 16 | 0.51% | 10 | 0.32% | 208 | 6.64% | 3,132 |
| Pocahontas | 2,836 | 52.32% | 2,540 | 46.85% | 26 | 0.48% | 19 | 0.35% | 296 | 5.46% | 5,421 |
| Preston | 6,729 | 74.73% | 2,150 | 23.88% | 87 | 0.97% | 38 | 0.42% | 4,579 | 50.86% | 9,004 |
| Putnam | 3,223 | 54.49% | 2,578 | 43.58% | 108 | 1.83% | 6 | 0.10% | 645 | 10.90% | 5,915 |
| Raleigh | 7,668 | 56.19% | 5,916 | 43.35% | 53 | 0.39% | 9 | 0.07% | 1,752 | 12.84% | 13,646 |
| Randolph | 4,158 | 46.11% | 4,676 | 51.85% | 153 | 1.70% | 31 | 0.34% | -518 | -5.74% | 9,018 |
| Ritchie | 4,377 | 67.39% | 2,050 | 31.56% | 40 | 0.62% | 28 | 0.43% | 2,327 | 35.83% | 6,495 |
| Roane | 4,232 | 57.78% | 3,082 | 42.08% | 6 | 0.08% | 4 | 0.05% | 1,150 | 15.70% | 7,324 |
| Summers | 3,611 | 50.24% | 3,552 | 49.42% | 15 | 0.21% | 9 | 0.13% | 59 | 0.82% | 7,187 |
| Taylor | 3,649 | 60.02% | 2,311 | 38.01% | 76 | 1.25% | 44 | 0.72% | 1,338 | 22.01% | 6,080 |
| Tucker | 2,498 | 53.34% | 1,961 | 41.87% | 185 | 3.95% | 39 | 0.83% | 537 | 11.47% | 4,683 |
| Tyler | 3,654 | 66.33% | 1,762 | 31.98% | 63 | 1.14% | 30 | 0.54% | 1,892 | 34.34% | 5,509 |
| Upshur | 4,936 | 77.17% | 1,418 | 22.17% | 12 | 0.19% | 30 | 0.47% | 3,518 | 55.00% | 6,396 |
| Wayne | 3,754 | 45.54% | 4,490 | 54.46% | 0 | 0.00% | 0 | 0.00% | -736 | -8.93% | 8,244 |
| Webster | 1,562 | 44.51% | 1,942 | 55.34% | 5 | 0.14% | 0 | 0.00% | -380 | -10.83% | 3,509 |
| Wetzel | 3,619 | 46.37% | 4,103 | 52.58% | 54 | 0.69% | 28 | 0.36% | -484 | -6.20% | 7,804 |
| Wirt | 1,680 | 54.88% | 1,376 | 44.95% | 4 | 0.13% | 1 | 0.03% | 304 | 9.93% | 3,061 |
| Wood | 10,463 | 53.72% | 8,839 | 45.38% | 129 | 0.66% | 47 | 0.24% | 1,624 | 8.34% | 19,478 |
| Wyoming | 2,950 | 61.78% | 1,825 | 38.22% | 0 | 0.00% | 0 | 0.00% | 1,125 | 23.56% | 4,775 |
| Totals | 282,007 | 55.30% | 220,785 | 43.30% | 5,618 | 1.10% | 1,526 | 0.30% | 61,222 | 12.01% | 509,936 |
