= 1936 United States presidential election in West Virginia =

- November 3, 1936

All 8 West Virginia votes to the Electoral College

Nominee	Franklin D. Roosevelt	Alf Landon
Party	Democratic	Republican
Home state	New York	Kansas
Running mate	John Nance Garner	Frank Knox
Electoral vote	8	0
Popular vote	502,582	325,358
Percentage	60.56%	39.20%
County results
Roosevelt
40–50%
50–60%
60–70%
70–80%
Landon
50–60%
60–70%
70–80%
President before election
Franklin D. Roosevelt
Democratic
Elected President
Franklin D. Roosevelt
Democratic

The 1936 United States presidential election in West Virginia took place on November 3, 1936, as part of the 1936 United States presidential election. West Virginia voters chose eight representatives, or electors, to the Electoral College, who voted for president and vice president.

West Virginia was won by incumbent President Franklin D. Roosevelt (D–New York), running with Vice President John Nance Garner, with 60.56 percent of the popular vote, against Governor Alf Landon (R–Kansas), running with Frank Knox, with 39.20 percent of the popular vote. Owing to powerful support for Roosevelt in labor-conscious coal-mining areas of the south and industrial areas of the Northern Panhandle, Roosevelt more than doubled his 1932 margin despite losing Jackson, Mason and Roane Counties. In McDowell County, which had not voted Democratic since 1884, FDR improved from 43.36 percent to 71.79 percent, and he made double-digit gains in adjacent Mingo, Logan, Wyoming, Raleigh and Fayette Counties.

Despite Roosevelt's appeal to coal miners and other industrial workers, West Virginia still voted 2.90 points more Republican than the nation at-large, helped by Landon's gains in the central regions of the state. This would be the last presidential election where West Virginia voted more Republican than the nation until 1972.

== Results ==
1936 United States presidential election in West Virginia
Party	Candidate	Votes	%
Democratic	Franklin D. Roosevelt (inc.)	502,582	60.56%
Republican	Alf Landon	325,358	39.20%
Prohibition	D. Leigh Colvin	1,173	0.14%
Socialist	Norman Thomas	832	0.10%
Total votes		829,945	100%

=== Results by county ===
1936 United States presidential election in West Virginia by county
County	Franklin D. Roosevelt Democratic		Alf Landon Republican		Norman Thomas Socialist		William D. Upshaw Prohibition		Margin		Total votes cast
County	#	%	#	%	#	%	#	%	#	%	Total votes cast
Barbour	5,284	57.45%	3,875	42.13%	19	0.21%	20	0.22%	1,409	15.32%	9,198
Berkeley	8,336	55.72%	6,585	44.02%	26	0.17%	13	0.09%	1,751	11.70%	14,960
Boone	7,697	68.88%	3,477	31.12%	0	0.00%	0	0.00%	4,220	37.77%	11,174
Braxton	5,667	60.34%	3,709	39.49%	8	0.09%	8	0.09%	1,958	20.85%	9,392
Brooke	5,955	62.72%	3,485	36.70%	26	0.27%	29	0.31%	2,470	26.01%	9,495
Cabell	27,319	58.87%	19,003	40.95%	50	0.11%	37	0.08%	8,316	17.92%	46,409
Calhoun	3,369	65.87%	1,733	33.88%	10	0.20%	3	0.06%	1,636	31.98%	5,115
Clay	3,387	57.36%	2,513	42.56%	4	0.07%	1	0.02%	874	14.80%	5,905
Doddridge	1,716	36.17%	3,023	63.72%	4	0.08%	1	0.02%	-1,307	-27.55%	4,744
Fayette	23,864	72.57%	8,942	27.19%	53	0.16%	27	0.08%	14,922	45.37%	32,886
Gilmer	3,433	64.88%	1,858	35.12%	0	0.00%	0	0.00%	1,575	29.77%	5,291
Grant	995	25.36%	2,923	74.51%	2	0.05%	3	0.08%	-1,928	-49.15%	3,923
Greenbrier	10,738	64.41%	5,881	35.27%	40	0.24%	13	0.08%	4,857	29.13%	16,672
Hampshire	3,792	71.21%	1,512	28.39%	17	0.32%	4	0.08%	2,280	42.82%	5,325
Hancock	7,756	65.89%	3,957	33.62%	40	0.34%	18	0.15%	3,799	32.27%	11,771
Hardy	2,956	65.08%	1,581	34.81%	4	0.09%	1	0.02%	1,375	30.27%	4,542
Harrison	24,361	62.98%	14,180	36.66%	84	0.22%	53	0.14%	10,181	26.32%	38,678
Jackson	3,453	42.25%	4,711	57.65%	3	0.04%	5	0.06%	-1,258	-15.39%	8,172
Jefferson	5,443	72.56%	2,040	27.20%	10	0.13%	8	0.11%	3,403	45.37%	7,501
Kanawha	50,801	58.86%	35,387	41.00%	55	0.06%	58	0.07%	15,414	17.86%	86,301
Lewis	5,531	49.90%	5,499	49.61%	40	0.36%	14	0.13%	32	0.29%	11,084
Lincoln	5,370	55.07%	4,382	44.93%	0	0.00%	0	0.00%	988	10.13%	9,752
Logan	18,424	72.13%	7,069	27.68%	28	0.11%	21	0.08%	11,355	44.46%	25,542
Marion	20,859	64.29%	11,403	35.15%	92	0.28%	89	0.27%	9,456	29.15%	32,443
Marshall	9,198	53.35%	7,967	46.21%	49	0.28%	27	0.16%	1,231	7.14%	17,241
Mason	4,852	45.00%	5,894	54.67%	24	0.22%	12	0.11%	-1,042	-9.66%	10,782
McDowell	25,471	71.79%	9,975	28.11%	21	0.06%	14	0.04%	15,496	43.67%	35,481
Mercer	18,391	63.02%	10,762	36.88%	18	0.06%	12	0.04%	7,629	26.14%	29,183
Mineral	5,333	54.09%	4,486	45.50%	12	0.12%	28	0.28%	847	8.59%	9,859
Mingo	11,278	66.09%	5,771	33.82%	5	0.03%	10	0.06%	5,507	32.27%	17,064
Monongalia	13,677	60.57%	8,811	39.02%	33	0.15%	61	0.27%	4,866	21.55%	22,582
Monroe	3,413	50.98%	3,268	48.81%	9	0.13%	5	0.07%	145	2.17%	6,695
Morgan	1,620	38.72%	2,555	61.07%	8	0.19%	1	0.02%	-935	-22.35%	4,184
Nicholas	5,872	59.28%	3,964	40.02%	58	0.59%	12	0.12%	1,908	19.26%	9,906
Ohio	22,899	62.30%	13,743	37.39%	29	0.08%	87	0.24%	9,156	24.91%	36,758
Pendleton	2,637	59.26%	1,800	40.45%	12	0.27%	1	0.02%	837	18.81%	4,450
Pleasants	1,907	51.06%	1,820	48.73%	5	0.13%	3	0.08%	87	2.33%	3,735
Pocahontas	4,118	59.01%	2,850	40.84%	6	0.09%	4	0.06%	1,268	18.17%	6,978
Preston	5,410	41.62%	7,553	58.11%	19	0.15%	15	0.12%	-2,143	-16.49%	12,997
Putnam	4,756	54.54%	3,938	45.16%	9	0.10%	17	0.19%	818	9.38%	8,720
Raleigh	22,840	71.63%	9,001	28.23%	29	0.09%	15	0.05%	13,839	43.40%	31,885
Randolph	8,109	68.48%	3,711	31.34%	13	0.11%	9	0.08%	4,398	37.14%	11,842
Ritchie	2,825	37.74%	4,639	61.97%	16	0.21%	6	0.08%	-1,814	-24.23%	7,486
Roane	5,047	48.81%	5,282	51.08%	10	0.10%	2	0.02%	-235	-2.27%	10,341
Summers	5,779	62.07%	3,521	37.82%	9	0.10%	2	0.02%	2,258	24.25%	9,311
Taylor	5,795	58.55%	4,061	41.03%	30	0.30%	12	0.12%	1,734	17.52%	9,898
Tucker	3,801	61.61%	2,335	37.85%	23	0.37%	10	0.16%	1,466	23.76%	6,169
Tyler	2,509	38.25%	4,031	61.46%	15	0.23%	4	0.06%	-1,522	-23.20%	6,559
Upshur	3,163	35.40%	5,745	64.30%	16	0.18%	10	0.11%	-2,582	-28.90%	8,934
Wayne	8,954	61.38%	5,603	38.41%	23	0.16%	8	0.05%	3,351	22.97%	14,588
Webster	4,613	69.70%	1,987	30.02%	10	0.15%	8	0.12%	2,626	39.68%	6,618
Wetzel	6,463	62.98%	3,770	36.74%	20	0.19%	9	0.09%	2,693	26.24%	10,262
Wirt	1,783	52.24%	1,612	47.23%	18	0.53%	0	0.00%	171	5.01%	3,413
Wood	16,829	57.21%	12,574	42.75%	9	0.03%	2	0.01%	4,255	14.47%	29,414
Wyoming	6,734	65.16%	3,601	34.84%	0	0.00%	0	0.00%	3,133	30.31%	10,335
Totals	502,582	60.56%	325,358	39.20%	1,173	0.14%	832	0.10%	177,224	21.35%	829,945

==== Counties that flipped from Democratic to Republican ====
- Jackson
- Mason
- Roane

==== Counties that flipped from Republican to Democratic ====
- McDowell
- Mineral
