= 1876 United States presidential election in West Virginia =

- November 7, 1876
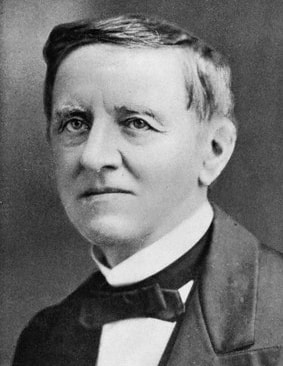

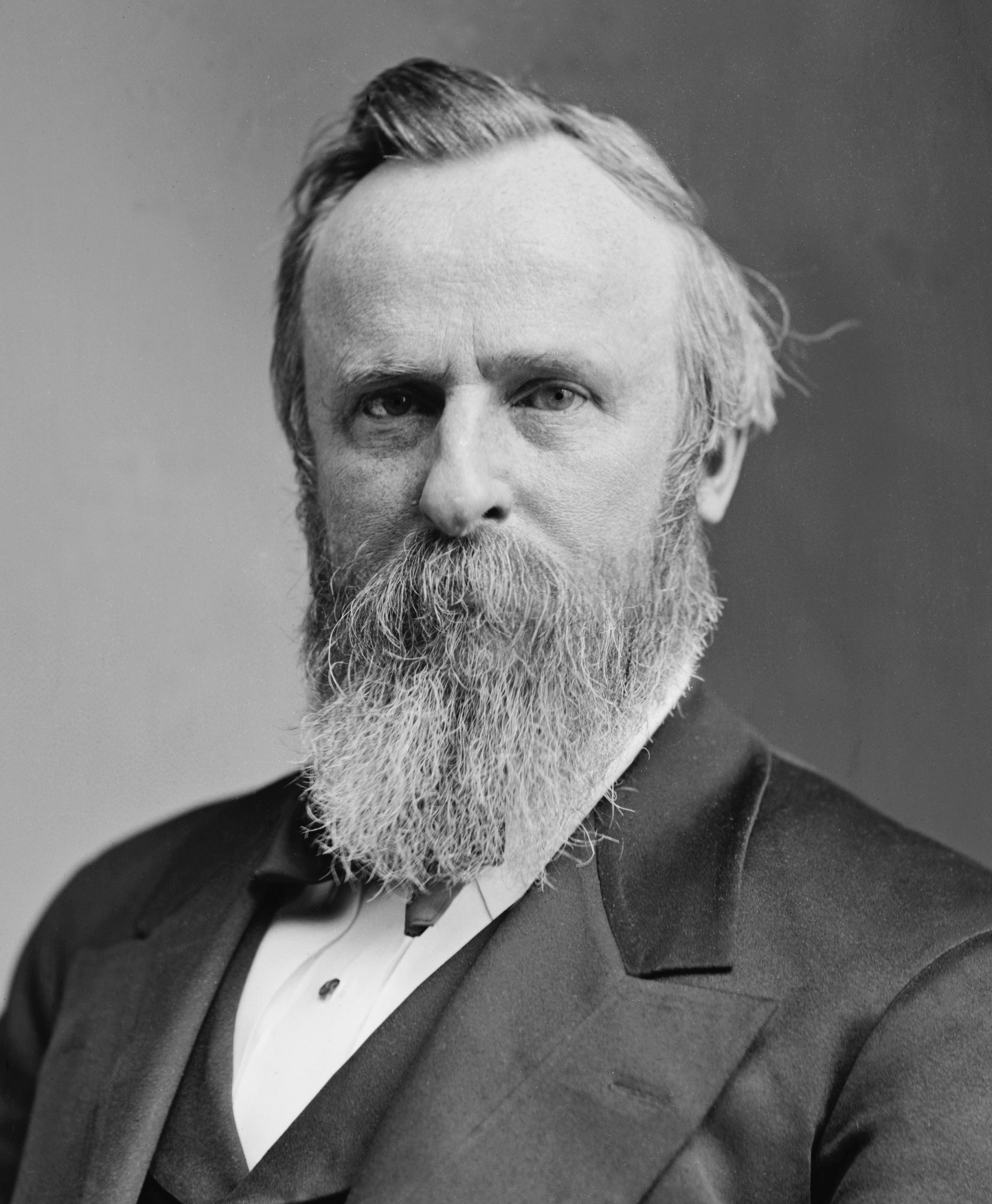
| Nominee | Samuel J. Tilden | Rutherford B. Hayes |
| Party | Democratic | Republican |
| Home state | New York | Ohio |
| Running mate | Thomas A. Hendricks | William A. Wheeler |
| Electoral vote | 5 | 0 |
| Popular vote | 56,546 | 41,997 |
| Percentage | 56.75% | 42.15% |
County results
Tilden
40–50%
50–60%
60–70%
70–80%
80–90%
90–100%
Hayes
50–60%
60–70%
President before election
Ulysses S. Grant
Republican
Elected President
Rutherford B. Hayes
Republican

The 1876 United States presidential election in West Virginia took place on November 7, 1876, as part of the 1876 United States presidential election. West Virginia voters chose five representatives, or electors, to the Electoral College, who voted for president and vice president.

West Virginia was won by Samuel J. Tilden, the former governor of New York (D–New York), running with Thomas A. Hendricks, the governor of Indiana and future vice president, with 56.75% of the popular vote, against Rutherford B. Hayes, the governor of Ohio (R-Ohio), running with Representative William A. Wheeler, with 42.15% of the vote.

With his win, Tilden became the first Democratic presidential candidate to win West Virginia. Doddridge County voted Democratic only once since, in 1964. The Greenback Party, who chose industrialist Peter Cooper and former representative Samuel Fenton Cary, received 1.11% of the vote.

== Results ==
1876 United States presidential election in West Virginia
| Party | Candidate | Running mate | Popular vote | | Electoral vote | |
| Party | Candidate | Running mate | Count | % | Count | % |
|---|---|---|---|---|---|---|
| Democratic | Samuel J. Tilden of New York | Thomas A. Hendricks of Indiana | 56,546 | 56.75% | 5 | 100.00% |
| Republican | Rutherford B. Hayes of Ohio | William A. Wheeler of New York | 41,997 | 42.15% | 0 | 0.00% |
| Greenback | Peter Cooper of New York | Samuel Fenton Cary of Ohio | 1,104 | 1.11% | 0 | 0.00% |
| Total | | | 99,647 | 100.00% | 5 | 100.00% |

== See also ==
- United States presidential elections in West Virginia
