= United States presidential elections in West Virginia =

Presidential elections in West Virginia
- Number of elections: 41
- Voted Democratic: 20
- Voted Republican: 21
- Voted other: 0
- Voted for winning candidate: 30
- Voted for losing candidate: 11

Following is a table of United States presidential elections in West Virginia, ordered by year. Since its admission to statehood in 1863, West Virginia has participated in every U.S. presidential election. Prior to 1863, the territory currently comprising the state of West Virginia was part of the state of Virginia, and citizens residing in that area have thus been able to participate in every U.S. election.

Winners of the state are in bold. The shading refers to the state winner, and not the national winner.

Year	Winner (nationally)	Votes	Percent	Runner-up (nationally)	Votes	Percent	Other national candidates (Note: For purposes of these lists, other national candidates are defined as those who won at least one electoral vote, or won at least ten percent of the vote in multiple states.)	Votes	Percent	Electoral votes	Notes
2024	**Donald Trump**	533,556	69.97	Kamala Harris	214,309	28.10	—			4	
2020	Joe Biden	235,984	29.69	**Donald Trump**	545,382	68.62	—			5	
2016	**Donald Trump** (Note: Won the electoral college while losing the popular vote)	489,371	68.50	Hillary Clinton	188,794	26.43	—			5	
2012	Barack Obama	238,269	35.54	**Mitt Romney**	417,655	62.3	—			5	
2008	Barack Obama	303,857	42.59	**John McCain**	397,466	55.71	—			5	
2004	**George W. Bush**	423,778	56.06	John Kerry	326,541	43.2	—			5	
2000	**George W. Bush**	336,475	51.92	Al Gore	295,497	45.59	—			5	
1996	**Bill Clinton**	327,812	51.51	Bob Dole	233,946	36.76	Ross Perot	71,639	11.26	5	
1992	**Bill Clinton**	331,001	48.41	George H. W. Bush	241,974	35.39	Ross Perot	108,829	15.91	5	
1988	George H. W. Bush	310,065	47.46	**Michael Dukakis**	341,016	52.2	—			6	electoral vote split: 5 to Dukakis, 1 to Bentsen (faithless elector)
1984	**Ronald Reagan**	405,483	55.11	Walter Mondale	328,125	44.6	—			6	
1980	Ronald Reagan	334,206	45.3	**Jimmy Carter**	367,462	49.81	John B. Anderson	31,691	4.3	6	
1976	**Jimmy Carter**	435,914	58.07	Gerald Ford	314,760	41.93	—			6	
1972	**Richard Nixon**	484,964	63.61	George McGovern	277,435	36.39	—			6	
1968	Richard Nixon	307,555	40.78	**Hubert Humphrey**	374,091	49.6	George Wallace	72,560	9.62	7	
1964	**Lyndon B. Johnson**	538,087	67.94	Barry Goldwater	253,953	32.06	—			7	
1960	**John F. Kennedy**	441,786	52.73	Richard Nixon	395,995	47.27	—			8	
1956	**Dwight D. Eisenhower**	449,297	54.08	Adlai Stevenson II	381,534	45.92	T. Coleman Andrews/ Unpledged Electors (Note: Was allied with a slate of unpledged electors in Louisiana, Mississippi and South Carolina)	—	—	8	
1952	Dwight D. Eisenhower	419,970	48.08	**Adlai Stevenson II**	453,578	51.92	—			8	
1948	**Harry S. Truman**	429,188	57.32	Thomas E. Dewey	316,251	42.24	Strom Thurmond	—	—	8	
1944	**Franklin D. Roosevelt**	392,777	54.89	Thomas E. Dewey	322,819	45.11	—			8	
1940	**Franklin D. Roosevelt**	495,662	57.1	Wendell Willkie	372,414	42.9	—			8	
1936	**Franklin D. Roosevelt**	502,582	60.56	Alf Landon	325,358	39.2	—			8	
1932	**Franklin D. Roosevelt**	405,124	54.47	Herbert Hoover	330,731	44.47	—			8	
1928	**Herbert Hoover**	375,551	58.43	Al Smith	263,784	41.04	—			8	
1924	**Calvin Coolidge**	288,635	49.45	John W. Davis	257,232	44.07	Robert M. La Follette	36,723	6.29	8	
1920	**Warren G. Harding**	282,007	55.30	James M. Cox	220,789	43.30	Parley P. Christensen	—	—	8	
1916	Woodrow Wilson	140,403	48.44	**Charles E. Hughes**	143,124	49.38	—			8	electoral vote split: 7 to Hughes, 1 to Wilson (faithless elector)
1912	**Woodrow Wilson**	113,197	42.11	Theodore Roosevelt	79,112	29.43	William H. Taft	56,754	21.11	8	
1908	**William H. Taft**	137,869	53.42	William Jennings Bryan	111,418	43.17	—			7	
1904	**Theodore Roosevelt**	132,620	55.26	Alton B. Parker	100,855	42.03	—			7	
1900	**William McKinley**	119,829	54.27	William Jennings Bryan	98,807	44.75	—			6	
1896	**William McKinley**	105,379	52.23	William Jennings Bryan	94,480	46.83	—			6	
1892	**Grover Cleveland**	84,467	49.37	Benjamin Harrison	80,292	46.93	James B. Weaver	4,167	2.44	6	
1888	Benjamin Harrison	78,171	49.03	**Grover Cleveland**	78,677	49.35	—			6	
1884	**Grover Cleveland**	67,311	50.94	James G. Blaine	63,096	47.75	—			6	
1880	James A. Garfield	46,243	41.05	**Winfield S. Hancock**	57,390	50.95	James B. Weaver	9,008	8.00	5	
1876	Rutherford B. Hayes	41,997	42.15	**Samuel J. Tilden**	56,546	56.75	—			5	
1872	**Ulysses S. Grant**	32,320	51.74	Horace Greeley	29,532	47.28	—			5	
1868	**Ulysses S. Grant**	29,015	58.8	Horatio Seymour	20,306	41.2	—			5	
1864	**Abraham Lincoln**	23,799	68.2	George B. McClellan	11,078	31.8	—			5	

== See also ==
- Elections in West Virginia
