= 1944 United States presidential election in West Virginia =

- November 7, 1944

Nominee	Franklin D. Roosevelt	Thomas E. Dewey
Party	Democratic	Republican
Home state	New York	New York
Running mate	Harry S. Truman	John W. Bricker
Electoral vote	8	0
Popular vote	392,777	322,819
Percentage	54.89%	45.11%
County results
Roosevelt
50–60%
60–70%
Dewey
50–60%
60–70%
70–80%
80–90%
President before election
Franklin D. Roosevelt
Democratic
Elected President
Franklin D. Roosevelt
Democratic

The 1944 United States presidential election in West Virginia took place on November 7, 1944, as part of the 1944 United States presidential election. West Virginia voters chose eight representatives, or electors, to the Electoral College, who voted for president and vice president.

West Virginia was won by President Franklin D. Roosevelt (D–New York), running with Senator Harry S. Truman, with 54.89 percent of the popular vote, against the 41st Governor of New York Thomas E. Dewey (R–New York), running with the 54th Governor of Ohio, John W. Bricker, with 45.11 percent of the popular vote. This would be the last election until 2004 when West Virginia voted to the right of neighboring Virginia, and the last until 2016 when West Virginia voted to the right of Utah. Roosevelt remains the only Democratic presidential candidate to win an outright majority of the state's vote more than once.

== Results ==
1944 United States presidential election in West Virginia
Party	Candidate	Votes	%
Democratic	Franklin D. Roosevelt (incumbent)	392,777	54.89%
Republican	Thomas E. Dewey	322,819	45.11%
Total votes		715,596	100.00%

=== Results by county ===
1944 United States presidential election in West Virginia by county
County	Franklin D. Roosevelt Democratic		Thomas E. Dewey Republican		Margin		Total votes cast
County	#	%	#	%	#	%	Total votes cast
Barbour	3,718	48.22%	3,993	51.78%	-275	-3.57%	7,711
Berkeley	5,819	48.61%	6,151	51.39%	-332	-2.77%	11,970
Boone	6,366	64.86%	3,449	35.14%	2,917	29.72%	9,815
Braxton	4,313	58.79%	3,023	41.21%	1,290	17.58%	7,336
Brooke	5,726	61.48%	3,588	38.52%	2,138	22.95%	9,314
Cabell	23,020	53.68%	19,861	46.32%	3,159	7.37%	42,881
Calhoun	2,254	57.19%	1,687	42.81%	567	14.39%	3,941
Clay	2,395	53.12%	2,114	46.88%	281	6.23%	4,509
Doddridge	1,000	27.69%	2,611	72.31%	-1,611	-44.61%	3,611
Fayette	17,529	68.85%	7,932	31.15%	9,597	37.69%	25,461
Gilmer	2,509	60.31%	1,651	39.69%	858	20.63%	4,160
Grant	570	15.98%	2,996	84.02%	-2,426	-68.03%	3,566
Greenbrier	7,231	60.15%	4,790	39.85%	2,441	20.31%	12,021
Hampshire	2,485	60.27%	1,638	39.73%	847	20.54%	4,123
Hancock	7,334	63.12%	4,285	36.88%	3,049	26.24%	11,619
Hardy	2,111	58.64%	1,489	41.36%	622	17.28%	3,600
Harrison	18,028	55.58%	14,408	44.42%	3,620	11.16%	32,436
Jackson	2,401	34.86%	4,486	65.14%	-2,085	-30.27%	6,887
Jefferson	3,767	64.17%	2,103	35.83%	1,664	28.35%	5,870
Kanawha	47,400	56.50%	36,488	43.50%	10,912	13.01%	83,888
Lewis	3,350	40.20%	4,984	59.80%	-1,634	-19.61%	8,334
Lincoln	3,654	46.67%	4,175	53.33%	-521	-6.65%	7,829
Logan	14,692	64.75%	8,000	35.25%	6,692	29.49%	22,692
Marion	17,640	60.36%	11,584	39.64%	6,056	20.72%	29,224
Marshall	7,174	47.91%	7,800	52.09%	-626	-4.18%	14,974
Mason	3,662	39.50%	5,609	60.50%	-1,947	-21.00%	9,271
McDowell	19,300	63.65%	11,023	36.35%	8,277	27.30%	30,323
Mercer	14,861	59.69%	10,034	40.31%	4,827	19.39%	24,895
Mineral	3,989	46.25%	4,635	53.75%	-646	-7.49%	8,624
Mingo	9,550	66.97%	4,711	33.03%	4,839	33.93%	14,261
Monongalia	10,429	51.95%	9,647	48.05%	782	3.90%	20,076
Monroe	2,615	45.52%	3,130	54.48%	-515	-8.96%	5,745
Morgan	895	27.99%	2,303	72.01%	-1,408	-44.03%	3,198
Nicholas	4,305	56.91%	3,259	43.09%	1,046	13.83%	7,564
Ohio	17,445	51.90%	16,165	48.10%	1,280	3.81%	33,610
Pendleton	2,177	54.22%	1,838	45.78%	339	8.44%	4,015
Pleasants	1,507	48.16%	1,622	51.84%	-115	-3.68%	3,129
Pocahontas	2,897	55.32%	2,340	44.68%	557	10.64%	5,237
Preston	2,997	30.64%	6,785	69.36%	-3,788	-38.72%	9,782
Putnam	3,918	49.33%	4,025	50.67%	-107	-1.35%	7,943
Raleigh	17,988	63.54%	10,323	36.46%	7,665	27.07%	28,311
Randolph	6,299	63.12%	3,681	36.88%	2,618	26.23%	9,980
Ritchie	1,650	29.40%	3,963	70.60%	-2,313	-41.21%	5,613
Roane	3,787	44.89%	4,650	55.11%	-863	-10.23%	8,437
Summers	4,399	59.72%	2,967	40.28%	1,432	19.44%	7,366
Taylor	3,653	48.43%	3,890	51.57%	-237	-3.14%	7,543
Tucker	2,673	54.63%	2,220	45.37%	453	9.26%	4,893
Tyler	1,428	29.40%	3,429	70.60%	-2,001	-41.20%	4,857
Upshur	2,026	27.53%	5,332	72.47%	-3,306	-44.93%	7,358
Wayne	6,627	59.47%	4,516	40.53%	2,111	18.94%	11,143
Webster	3,285	67.32%	1,595	32.68%	1,690	34.63%	4,880
Wetzel	4,335	54.60%	3,604	45.40%	731	9.21%	7,939
Wirt	1,170	45.21%	1,418	54.79%	-248	-9.58%	2,588
Wood	13,676	48.42%	14,566	51.58%	-890	-3.15%	28,242
Wyoming	6,748	61.34%	4,253	38.66%	2,495	22.68%	11,001
Totals	392,777	54.89%	322,819	45.11%	69,958	9.78%	715,596

==== Counties that flipped from Democratic to Republican ====
- Barbour
- Berkeley
- Lincoln
- Mineral
- Putnam
- Taylor
- Wood
