= 1960 United States presidential election in West Virginia =

- November 8, 1960

All 8 West Virginia votes to the Electoral College
- Turnout: 76.86% (of registered voters)

Nominee	John F. Kennedy	Richard Nixon
Party	Democratic	Republican
Home state	Massachusetts	California
Running mate	Lyndon B. Johnson	Henry Cabot Lodge Jr.
Electoral vote	8	0
Popular vote	441,786	395,995
Percentage	52.73%	47.27%
County results
Kennedy
50–60%
60–70%
70–80%
Nixon
50–60%
60–70%
70–80%
President before election
Dwight D. Eisenhower
Republican
Elected President
John F. Kennedy
Democratic

The 1960 United States presidential election in West Virginia took place on November 8, 1960, as part of the 1960 United States presidential election. West Virginia voters chose eight representatives, or electors, to the Electoral College, who voted for president and vice president.

West Virginia was won by Senator John F. Kennedy (D–Massachusetts), running with Senator Lyndon B. Johnson, with 52.73 percent of the popular vote against incumbent Vice President Richard Nixon (R–California), running with United States Ambassador to the United Nations Henry Cabot Lodge Jr., with 47.27 percent of the popular vote.

== Democratic Primary ==
The 1960 West Virginia Democratic primary election on May 20 was seen as a turning point in the Democratic primaries. John F Kennedy had shown that he could win a primary election against the liberal Senator Hubert Humphrey in the Wisconsin primary. Although Kennedy defeated Humphrey in Wisconsin, his reliance on heavily Catholic areas left many party bosses unconvinced. Kennedy thus faced Humphrey in the heavily Protestant state of West Virginia. Humphrey's campaign was low on money and could not compete with the well-organized, well-financed Kennedy team. Kennedy's siblings combed the state looking for votes, leading Humphrey to complain that he "felt like an independent merchant running against a chain store." On primary day, Kennedy crushed Humphrey with over 60% of the vote, and Humphrey withdrew from the race.

In West Virginia, Kennedy sought to show that he could win the support of Protestant voters and to remove Humphrey from the race, securing the party's liberal wing and setting up a showdown with Johnson for the nomination. Humphrey had high expectations, given that the state's population was rural, working class, ninety-five percent Protestant, and its delegates had backed him against Kennedy in the vice presidential contest four years prior.

Kennedy met the religious issue head-on, hoping to redefine the race as one of "tolerance against intolerance," rather than Catholic against Protestant. He also brought Franklin Delano Roosevelt Jr. to campaign in the state; Roosevelt then raised the issue of Humphrey's failure to serve in World War II. Though Humphrey had tried and failed to serve due to physical disability, Roosevelt attacked his lack of service record, publicly telling audiences, "I don't know where [Humphrey] was in World War Two," and distributing flyers that accused him of draft dodging. After the primary was over, Roosevelt apologized to Humphrey and retracted the claims, which he later called his greatest political regret.

Kennedy continued to outspend Humphrey heavily in West Virginia; though he publicly claimed expenditures of $100,000, later estimates placed his family's overall spending at $1.5 million, dwarfing Humphrey's $23,000. Humphrey traveled the state in a rented bus, while the Kennedys used a family-owned airplane. Humphrey later wrote of the West Virginia campaign, "as a professional politician I was able to accept and indeed respect the efficacy of the Kennedy campaign. But underneath the beautiful exterior, there was an element of ruthlessness and toughness that I had trouble either accepting or forgetting."

On May 4, 1960, Humphrey and Kennedy took part in a televised one-on-one debate at WCHS-TV in Charleston, West Virginia, ahead of the state's primary.

Kennedy defeated Humphrey soundly in West Virginia, and Humphrey announced his withdrawal from the race that night.

== Results ==
1960 United States presidential election in West Virginia
Party	Candidate	Votes	%
Democratic	John F. Kennedy	441,786	52.73%
Republican	Richard Nixon	395,995	47.27%
Total votes		837,781	100.00%

=== Results by county ===
County	John F. Kennedy Democratic		Richard Nixon Republican		Margin		Total votes cast
County	#	%	#	%	#	%	Total votes cast
Barbour	3,818	48.80%	4,006	51.20%	-188	-2.40%	7,824
Berkeley	7,072	45.80%	8,369	54.20%	-1,297	-8.40%	15,441
Boone	8,058	66.26%	4,104	33.74%	3,954	32.52%	12,162
Braxton	4,185	58.43%	2,977	41.57%	1,208	16.86%	7,162
Brooke	7,838	57.67%	5,754	42.33%	2,084	15.34%	13,592
Cabell	20,911	43.66%	26,988	56.34%	-6,077	-12.68%	47,899
Calhoun	1,975	50.37%	1,946	49.63%	29	0.74%	3,921
Clay	2,859	54.30%	2,406	45.70%	453	8.60%	5,265
Doddridge	1053	30.48%	2,402	69.52%	-1,349	-39.04%	3,455
Fayette	18,109	70.61%	7,537	29.39%	10,572	41.22%	25,646
Gilmer	2,075	58.93%	1,446	41.07%	629	17.86%	3,521
Grant	908	21.41%	3,333	78.59%	-2,425	-57.18%	4,241
Greenbrier	8,343	55.71%	6,633	44.29%	1,710	11.42%	14,976
Hampshire	2,849	52.86%	2,541	47.14%	308	5.72%	5,390
Hancock	11,176	58.19%	8,031	41.81%	3,145	16.38%	19,207
Hardy	2,465	54.69%	2,042	45.31%	423	9.38%	4,507
Harrison	20,727	53.00%	18,378	47.00%	2,349	6.00%	39,105
Jackson	3,615	39.51%	5,535	60.49%	-1,920	-20.98%	9,150
Jefferson	4,352	60.12%	2,887	39.88%	1,465	20.24%	7,239
Kanawha	54,484	48.81%	57,130	51.19%	-2,646	-2.38%	111,614
Lewis	3,649	41.44%	5,157	58.56%	-1,508	-17.12%	8,806
Lincoln	5,023	52.31%	4,579	47.69%	444	4.62%	9,602
Logan	16,360	67.61%	7,836	32.39%	8,524	35.22%	24,196
Marion	17,903	55.88%	14,138	44.12%	3,765	11.76%	32,041
Marshall	9,197	50.14%	9,147	49.86%	50	0.28%	18,344
Mason	4,522	41.31%	6,424	58.69%	-1,902	-17.38%	10,946
McDowell	19,501	74.84%	6,555	25.16%	12,946	49.68%	26,056
Mercer	17,289	59.60%	11,719	40.40%	5,570	19.20%	29,008
Mineral	4,164	39.80%	6,299	60.20%	-2,135	-20.40%	10,463
Mingo	11,259	69.66%	4,903	30.34%	6,356	39.32%	16,162
Monongalia	13,103	53.21%	11,523	46.79%	1,580	6.42%	24,626
Monroe	2,910	48.11%	3,139	51.89%	-229	-3.78%	6,049
Morgan	1,369	33.22%	2,752	66.78%	-1,383	-33.56%	4,121
Nicholas	5,774	57.33%	4,297	42.67%	1,477	14.66%	10,071
Ohio	18,423	51.48%	17,367	48.52%	1,056	2.96%	35,790
Pendleton	2,057	51.59%	1,930	48.41%	127	3.18%	3,987
Pleasants	1,742	46.78%	1,982	53.22%	-240	-6.44%	3,724
Pocahontas	2,822	53.34%	2,469	46.66%	353	6.68%	5,291
Preston	4,221	37.93%	6,908	62.07%	-2,687	-24.14%	11,129
Putnam	4,968	46.56%	5,702	53.44%	-734	-6.88%	10,670
Raleigh	20,448	62.85%	12,088	37.15%	8,360	25.70%	32,536
Randolph	6,989	58.21%	5,018	41.79%	1,971	16.42%	12,007
Ritchie	1,591	28.60%	3,972	71.40%	-2,381	-42.80%	5,563
Roane	3,280	42.47%	4,443	57.53%	-1,163	-15.06%	7,723
Summers	4,622	59.57%	3,137	40.43%	1,485	19.14%	7,759
Taylor	3,489	46.64%	3,992	53.36%	-503	-6.72%	7,481
Tucker	2,090	52.55%	1,887	47.45%	203	5.10%	3,977
Tyler	1,558	30.58%	3,537	69.42%	-1,979	-38.84%	5,095
Upshur	2,590	33.58%	5,123	66.42%	-2,533	-32.84%	7,713
Wayne	9,140	52.93%	8,128	47.07%	1,012	5.86%	17,268
Webster	3,479	67.32%	1,689	32.68%	1,790	34.64%	5,168
Wetzel	4,338	45.73%	5,149	54.27%	-811	-8.54%	9,487
Wirt	1,045	43.69%	1,347	56.31%	-302	-12.62%	2,392
Wood	15,396	41.03%	22,131	58.97%	-6,735	-17.94%	37,527
Wyoming	8,603	62.86%	5,083	37.14%	3,520	25.72%	13,686
Totals	441,786	52.73%	395,995	47.27%	45,791	5.46%	837,781

==== Counties that flipped from Republican to Democratic ====
- Calhoun
- Clay
- Greenbrier
- Hampshire
- Harrison
- Jefferson
- Marshall
- Mercer
- Monongalia
- Nicholas
- Raleigh
- Pocahontas
- Ohio
- Tucker
- Wayne
