= 1864 United States presidential election in West Virginia =

- November 8, 1864

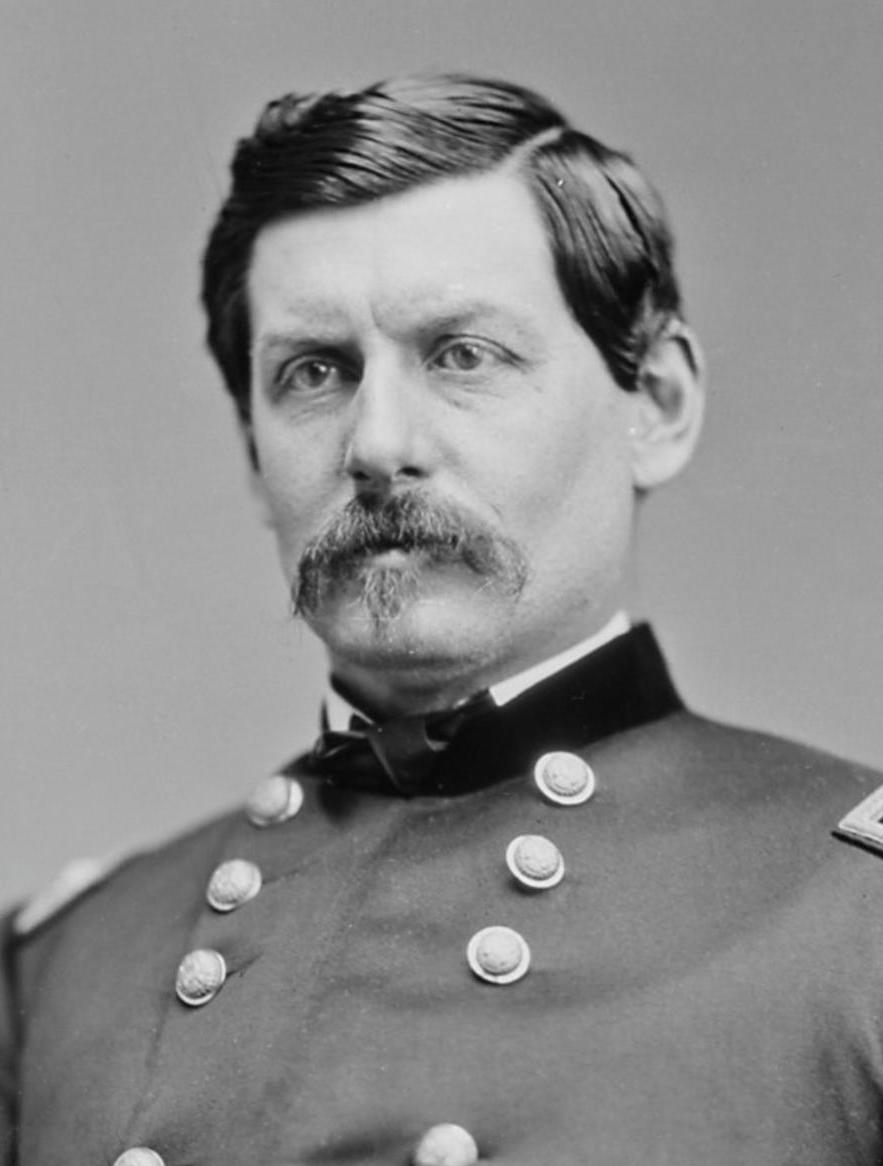
Nominee	Abraham Lincoln	George B. McClellan
Party	National Union	Democratic
Home state	Illinois	New Jersey
Running mate	Andrew Johnson	George H. Pendleton
Electoral vote	5	0
Popular vote	23,799	11,078
Percentage	68.24%	31.76%
County results
Lincoln
50–60%
60–70%
70–80%
80–90%
90–100%
McClellan
50–60%
No Data/Vote
President before election
Abraham Lincoln
Republican
Elected President
Abraham Lincoln
National Union

The 1864 United States presidential election in West Virginia took place on November 8, 1864, as part of the 1864 United States presidential election. State voters chose five representatives, or electors, to the Electoral College, who voted for president and vice president.

This was the first time that West Virginia participated in an election since gaining statehood, as it had been admitted as the 35th state on June 20, 1863. The state would be won by the incumbent President Abraham Lincoln of Illinois, running on the National Union ticket with former Senator and Military Governor of Tennessee Andrew Johnson. They defeated the Democratic candidate 4th Commanding General of the United States Army George B. McClellan of New Jersey and his running mate Representative George H. Pendleton of Ohio. Lincoln won the state by a margin of 36.48%.

With 68.24% of the popular vote, West Virginia would prove to be Lincoln's fifth strongest state in terms of popular vote percentage after Kansas, Vermont, Massachusetts and Missouri.

== Results ==
1864 United States presidential election in West Virginia
Party	Candidate	Votes	%
National Union	Abraham Lincoln (incumbent)	23,799	68.24%
Democratic	George B. McClellan	11,078	31.76%
Total votes		34,877	100.00%

== See also ==
- United States presidential elections in West Virginia
