= 1904 United States presidential election in West Virginia =

- November 8, 1904
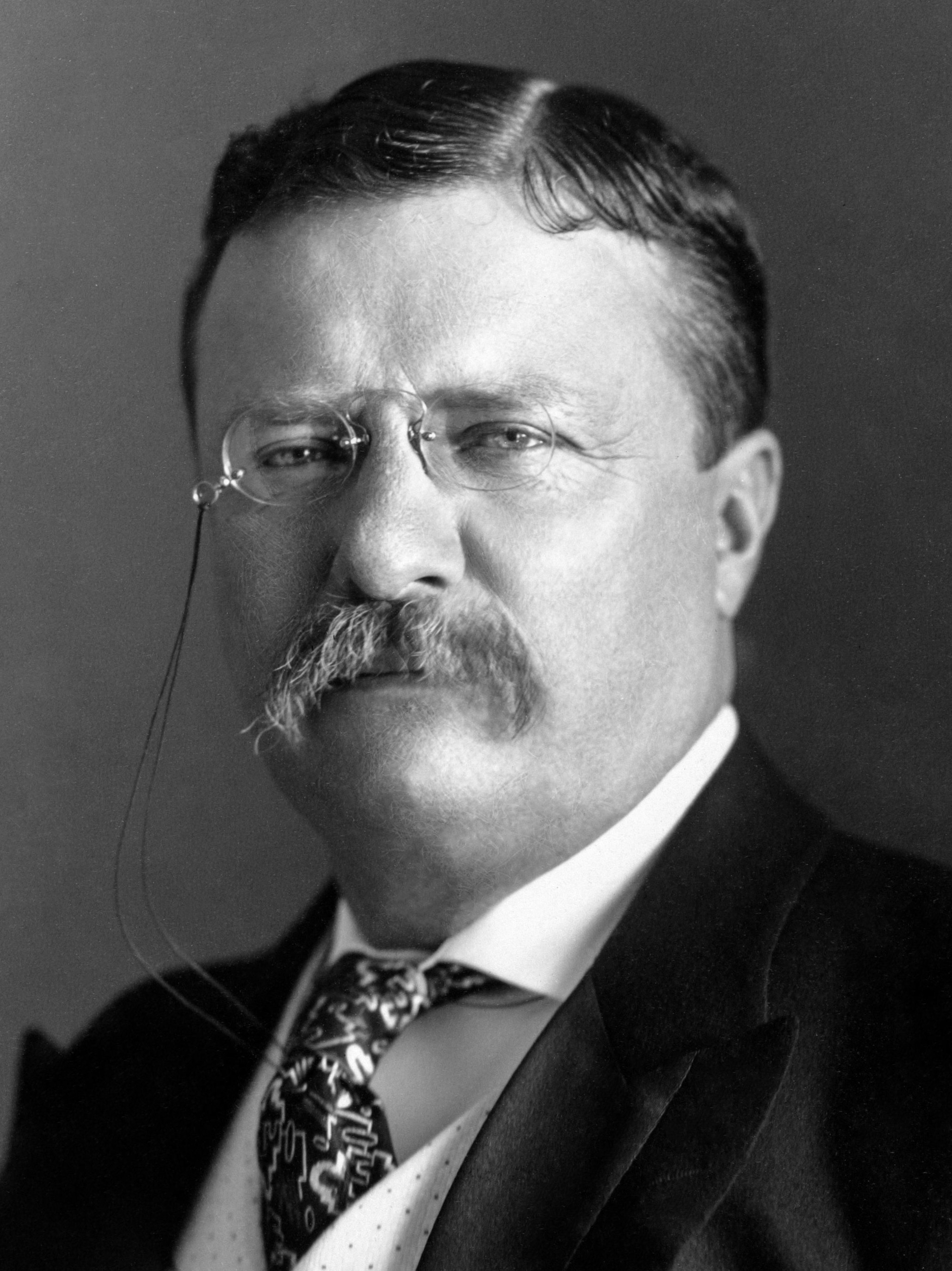

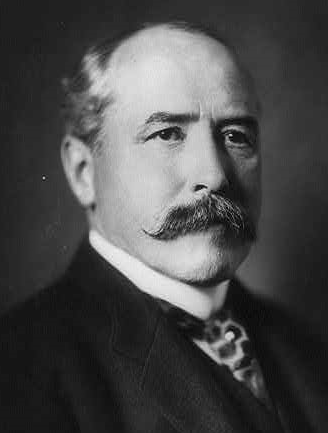
Nominee	Theodore Roosevelt	Alton B. Parker
Party	Republican	Democratic
Home state	New York	New York
Running mate	Charles W. Fairbanks	Henry G. Davis
Electoral vote	7	0
Popular vote	132,620	100,855
Percentage	55.26%	42.03%
County results
Roosevelt
40–50%
50–60%
60–70%
70–80%
Parker
40–50%
50–60%
60–70%
70–80%
President before election
Theodore Roosevelt
Republican
Elected President
Theodore Roosevelt
Republican

The 1904 United States presidential election in West Virginia took place on November 8, 1904. All contemporary 45 states were part of the 1904 United States presidential election. Voters chose seven electors to the Electoral College, which selected the president and vice president.

West Virginia was won by the Republican nominees, incumbent President Theodore Roosevelt of New York and his running mate Charles W. Fairbanks of Indiana. They defeated the Democratic nominees, former Chief Judge of New York Court of Appeals Alton B. Parker and his running mate, former US Senator Henry G. Davis, of which West Virginia was his home state. Roosevelt won the state by a margin of 13.23%.

Despite the over 13-point victory in the state, it was 5 points more Democratic than the national average.

== Results ==
1904 United States presidential election in West Virginia
Party	Candidate	Votes	Percentage	Electoral votes
Republican	Theodore Roosevelt (incumbent)	132,620	55.26%	7
Democratic	Alton B. Parker	100,855	42.03%	0
Prohibition	Silas C. Swallow	4,599	1.92%	0
Social Democratic	Eugene V. Debs	1,573	0.66%	0
Populist	Thomas E. Watson	339	0.14%	0
Totals		239,986	100.00%	7
Voter turnout				—

=== Results by county ===
1904 United States presidential election in West Virginia by county
County	Theodore Roosevelt Republican		Alton Parker Democratic		Silas Swallow Prohibition		Eugene V. Debs Socialist		Thomas Watson People's		Margin		Total votes cast
County	#	%	#	%	#	%	#	%	#	%	#	%	Total votes cast
Barbour	1,863	53.11%	1,585	45.18%	56	1.60%	4	0.11%	0	0.00%	278	7.92%	3,508
Berkeley	2,548	49.68%	2,488	48.51%	93	1.81%	0	0.00%	0	0.00%	60	1.17%	5,129
Boone	784	45.77%	912	53.24%	16	0.93%	0	0.00%	1	0.06%	-128	-7.47%	1,713
Braxton	2,177	47.58%	2,324	50.80%	62	1.36%	0	0.00%	12	0.26%	-147	-3.21%	4,575
Brooke	1,130	58.46%	742	38.39%	54	2.79%	7	0.36%	0	0.00%	388	20.07%	1,933
Cabell	3,778	52.55%	3,193	44.42%	117	1.63%	101	1.40%	0	0.00%	585	8.14%	7,189
Calhoun	1,125	45.29%	1,337	53.82%	16	0.64%	4	0.16%	2	0.08%	-212	-8.53%	2,484
Clay	1,025	47.85%	1,058	49.39%	59	2.75%	0	0.00%	0	0.00%	-33	-1.54%	2,142
Doddridge	1,774	61.03%	1,076	37.01%	48	1.65%	6	0.21%	3	0.10%	698	24.01%	2,907
Fayette	6,509	63.20%	3,295	31.99%	336	3.26%	155	1.51%	4	0.04%	3,214	31.21%	10,299
Gilmer	1,080	41.97%	1,435	55.77%	56	2.18%	0	0.00%	2	0.08%	-355	-13.80%	2,573
Grant	1,298	79.53%	312	19.12%	22	1.35%	0	0.00%	0	0.00%	986	60.42%	1,632
Greenbrier	2,296	46.70%	2,573	52.33%	45	0.92%	0	0.00%	3	0.06%	-277	-5.63%	4,917
Hampshire	700	26.44%	1,878	70.92%	18	0.68%	0	0.00%	52	1.96%	-1,178	-44.49%	2,648
Hancock	1,010	63.32%	508	31.85%	69	4.33%	4	0.25%	4	0.25%	502	31.47%	1,595
Hardy	638	33.85%	1,234	65.46%	4	0.21%	0	0.00%	9	0.48%	-596	-31.62%	1,885
Harrison	5,075	60.04%	2,921	34.56%	369	4.37%	21	0.25%	66	0.78%	2,154	25.49%	8,452
Jackson	2,596	54.50%	2,122	44.55%	28	0.59%	1	0.02%	16	0.34%	474	9.95%	4,763
Jefferson	1,308	33.41%	2,556	65.29%	50	1.28%	1	0.03%	0	0.00%	-1,248	-31.88%	3,915
Kanawha	8,857	58.62%	5,756	38.10%	205	1.36%	290	1.92%	0	0.00%	3,101	20.53%	15,108
Lewis	2,131	53.69%	1,621	40.84%	191	4.81%	13	0.33%	13	0.33%	510	12.85%	3,969
Lincoln	2,080	55.93%	1,586	42.65%	51	1.37%	2	0.05%	0	0.00%	494	13.28%	3,719
Logan	570	33.06%	1,123	65.14%	22	1.28%	9	0.52%	0	0.00%	-553	-32.08%	1,724
Marion	4,776	54.18%	3,762	42.68%	207	2.35%	58	0.66%	12	0.14%	1,014	11.50%	8,815
Marshall	3,924	60.76%	2,115	32.75%	246	3.81%	171	2.65%	2	0.03%	1,809	28.01%	6,458
Mason	2,983	57.78%	2,125	41.16%	31	0.60%	24	0.46%	0	0.00%	858	16.62%	5,163
McDowell	5,225	75.32%	1,676	24.16%	36	0.52%	0	0.00%	0	0.00%	3,549	51.16%	6,937
Mercer	3,640	60.15%	2,327	38.45%	63	1.04%	20	0.33%	2	0.03%	1,313	21.70%	6,052
Mineral	1,802	54.96%	1,397	42.60%	57	1.74%	22	0.67%	1	0.03%	405	12.35%	3,279
Mingo	1,607	49.08%	1,652	50.46%	14	0.43%	1	0.03%	0	0.00%	-45	-1.37%	3,274
Monongalia	3,188	64.70%	1,596	32.39%	113	2.29%	26	0.53%	4	0.08%	1,592	32.31%	4,927
Monroe	1,485	49.29%	1,503	49.88%	10	0.33%	0	0.00%	15	0.50%	-18	-0.60%	3,013
Morgan	1,097	64.23%	576	33.72%	31	1.81%	4	0.23%	0	0.00%	521	30.50%	1,708
Nicholas	1,416	47.20%	1,398	46.60%	184	6.13%	0	0.00%	2	0.07%	18	0.60%	3,000
Ohio	7,771	57.95%	5,128	38.24%	127	0.95%	381	2.84%	3	0.02%	2,643	19.71%	13,410
Pendleton	926	43.84%	1,169	55.35%	17	0.80%	0	0.00%	0	0.00%	-243	-11.51%	2,112
Pleasants	1,130	53.66%	945	44.87%	29	1.38%	2	0.09%	0	0.00%	185	8.78%	2,106
Pocahontas	1,167	49.70%	1,130	48.13%	49	2.09%	1	0.04%	1	0.04%	37	1.58%	2,348
Preston	3,935	73.86%	1,242	23.31%	87	1.63%	63	1.18%	1	0.02%	2,693	50.54%	5,328
Putnam	2,161	57.05%	1,566	41.34%	54	1.43%	5	0.13%	2	0.05%	595	15.71%	3,788
Raleigh	1,849	55.10%	1,394	41.54%	100	2.98%	5	0.15%	8	0.24%	455	13.56%	3,356
Randolph	1,892	42.49%	2,474	55.56%	85	1.91%	2	0.04%	0	0.00%	-582	-13.07%	4,453
Ritchie	2,622	61.94%	1,393	32.91%	199	4.70%	12	0.28%	7	0.17%	1,229	29.03%	4,233
Roane	2,294	53.86%	1,863	43.74%	53	1.24%	0	0.00%	49	1.15%	431	10.12%	4,259
Summers	1,702	46.35%	1,937	52.75%	29	0.79%	0	0.00%	4	0.11%	-235	-6.40%	3,672
Taylor	2,237	58.82%	1,466	38.55%	81	2.13%	19	0.50%	0	0.00%	771	20.27%	3,803
Tucker	1,800	59.29%	1,134	37.35%	100	3.29%	1	0.03%	1	0.03%	666	21.94%	3,036
Tyler	2,308	59.67%	1,332	34.44%	183	4.73%	40	1.03%	5	0.13%	976	25.23%	3,868
Upshur	2,405	72.05%	826	24.75%	103	3.09%	0	0.00%	4	0.12%	1,579	47.30%	3,338
Wayne	2,362	48.60%	2,449	50.39%	35	0.72%	2	0.04%	12	0.25%	-87	-1.79%	4,860
Webster	883	42.23%	1,208	57.77%	0	0.00%	0	0.00%	0	0.00%	-325	-15.54%	2,091
Wetzel	2,493	45.35%	2,833	51.54%	114	2.07%	48	0.87%	9	0.16%	-340	-6.19%	5,497
Wirt	1,134	50.09%	1,098	48.50%	30	1.33%	1	0.04%	1	0.04%	36	1.59%	2,264
Wood	4,969	55.81%	3,741	42.01%	133	1.49%	46	0.52%	15	0.17%	1,228	13.79%	8,904
Wyoming	1,093	57.62%	791	41.70%	13	0.69%	0	0.00%	0	0.00%	302	15.92%	1,897
Totals	132,628	55.26%	100,881	42.03%	4,600	1.92%	1,572	0.65%	347	0.14%	31,747	13.23%	240,028

== See also ==
- United States presidential elections in West Virginia
