= 1892 United States presidential election in West Virginia =

- November 8, 1892

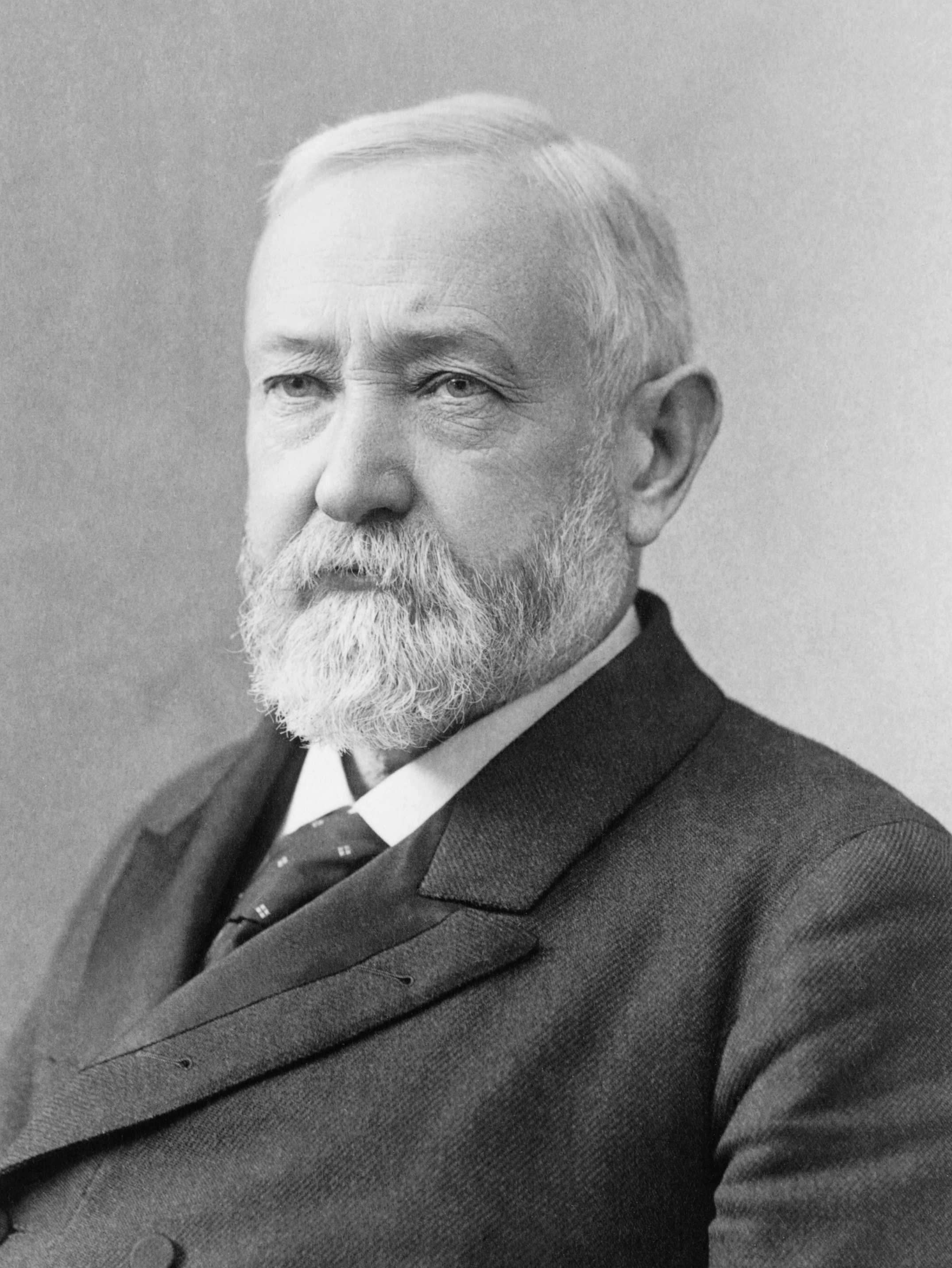
Nominee	Grover Cleveland	Benjamin Harrison
Party	Democratic	Republican
Home state	New York	Indiana
Running mate	Adlai Stevenson I	Whitelaw Reid
Electoral vote	6	0
Popular vote	84,467	80,292
Percentage	49.37%	46.93%
County results
Cleveland
40–50%
50–60%
60–70%
70–80%
Harrison
40–50%
50–60%
60–70%
70–80%
President before election
Benjamin Harrison
Republican
Elected President
Grover Cleveland
Democratic

The 1892 United States presidential election in West Virginia took place on November 8, 1892. All contemporary 44 states were part of the 1892 United States presidential election. State voters chose six electors to the Electoral College, which selected the president and vice president.

West Virginia was won by the Democratic nominees, former President Grover Cleveland of New York and his running mate Adlai Stevenson I of Illinois. This would prove the last occasion West Virginia voted Democratic in a presidential election until Woodrow Wilson would win the state in 1912.

== Results ==
1892 United States presidential election in West Virginia
Party	Candidate	Votes	Percentage	Electoral votes
Democratic	Grover Cleveland	84,467	49.37%	6
Republican	Benjamin Harrison (incumbent)	80,292	46.93%	0
Populist	James B. Weaver	4,167	2.44%	0
Prohibition	John Bidwell	2,153	1.26%	0
Totals		171,079	100.00%	6
Voter turnout				—

=== Results by county ===
1892 United States presidential election in West Virginia by county
County	Grover Cleveland Democratic		Benjamin Harrison Republican		James B. Weaver People's		John Bidwell Prohibition		Margin		Total votes cast
County	#	%	#	%	#	%	#	%	#	%	Total votes cast
Barbour	1,522	49.66%	1,497	48.84%	23	0.75%	23	0.75%	25	0.82%	3,065
Berkeley	2,133	48.28%	2,259	51.13%	8	0.18%	18	0.41%	-126	-2.85%	4,418
Boone	782	58.84%	541	40.71%	4	0.30%	2	0.15%	241	18.13%	1,329
Braxton	1,790	56.38%	1,113	35.06%	244	7.69%	28	0.88%	677	21.32%	3,175
Brooke	770	49.55%	740	47.62%	4	0.26%	40	2.57%	30	1.93%	1,554
Cabell	2,890	53.78%	2,328	43.32%	107	1.99%	49	0.91%	562	10.46%	5,374
Calhoun	993	59.89%	602	36.31%	57	3.44%	6	0.36%	391	23.58%	1,658
Clay	503	49.65%	494	48.77%	15	1.48%	1	0.10%	9	0.89%	1,013
Doddridge	1,156	45.39%	1,332	52.30%	17	0.67%	42	1.65%	-176	-6.91%	2,547
Fayette	2,232	43.06%	2,665	51.41%	185	3.57%	102	1.97%	-433	-8.35%	5,184
Gilmer	1,187	58.04%	816	39.90%	34	1.66%	8	0.39%	371	18.14%	2,045
Grant	400	25.54%	1,155	73.75%	3	0.19%	8	0.51%	-755	-48.21%	1,566
Greenbrier	2,299	63.49%	1,259	34.77%	38	1.05%	25	0.69%	1,040	28.72%	3,621
Hampshire	1,878	74.55%	523	20.76%	107	4.25%	11	0.44%	1,355	53.79%	2,519
Hancock	593	41.47%	693	48.46%	72	5.03%	72	5.03%	-100	-6.99%	1,430
Hardy	1,215	75.28%	381	23.61%	17	1.05%	1	0.06%	834	51.67%	1,614
Harrison	2,237	44.70%	2,567	51.30%	154	3.08%	46	0.92%	-330	-6.59%	5,004
Jackson	1,883	43.88%	2,131	49.66%	238	5.55%	39	0.91%	-248	-5.78%	4,291
Jefferson	2,530	69.35%	1,093	29.96%	9	0.25%	16	0.44%	1,437	39.39%	3,648
Kanawha	4,549	45.84%	5,078	51.17%	144	1.45%	152	1.53%	-529	-5.33%	9,923
Lewis	1,676	50.04%	1,550	46.28%	29	0.87%	94	2.81%	126	3.76%	3,349
Lincoln	1,081	47.90%	840	37.22%	323	14.31%	13	0.58%	241	10.68%	2,257
Logan	1,522	75.87%	484	24.13%	0	0.00%	0	0.00%	1,038	51.74%	2,006
Marion	2,662	48.79%	2,584	47.36%	72	1.32%	138	2.53%	78	1.43%	5,456
Marshall	1,808	37.00%	2,567	52.53%	339	6.94%	173	3.54%	-759	-15.53%	4,887
Mason	2,260	45.52%	2,600	52.37%	64	1.29%	41	0.83%	-340	-6.85%	4,965
McDowell	607	32.43%	1,265	67.57%	0	0.00%	0	0.00%	-658	-35.15%	1,872
Mercer	1,827	51.48%	1,651	46.52%	61	1.72%	10	0.28%	176	4.96%	3,549
Mineral	1,279	46.87%	1,356	49.69%	75	2.75%	19	0.70%	-77	-2.82%	2,729
Monongalia	1,505	39.38%	2,255	59.00%	24	0.63%	38	0.99%	-750	-19.62%	3,822
Monroe	1,373	53.24%	1,141	44.24%	58	2.25%	7	0.27%	232	9.00%	2,579
Morgan	582	38.62%	910	60.38%	2	0.13%	13	0.86%	-328	-21.77%	1,507
Nicholas	1,063	55.36%	728	37.92%	32	1.67%	97	5.05%	335	17.45%	1,920
Ohio	5,220	49.93%	5,061	48.41%	19	0.18%	154	1.47%	159	1.52%	10,454
Pendleton	1,075	59.59%	717	39.75%	8	0.44%	4	0.22%	358	19.84%	1,804
Pleasants	855	53.64%	713	44.73%	13	0.82%	13	0.82%	142	8.91%	1,594
Pocahontas	950	63.08%	539	35.79%	3	0.20%	14	0.93%	411	27.29%	1,506
Preston	1,323	30.31%	2,866	65.66%	88	2.02%	88	2.02%	-1,543	-35.35%	4,365
Putnam	1,597	48.39%	1,612	48.85%	76	2.30%	15	0.45%	-15	-0.45%	3,300
Raleigh	965	51.94%	871	46.88%	7	0.38%	15	0.81%	94	5.06%	1,858
Randolph	1,622	65.17%	839	33.71%	11	0.44%	17	0.68%	783	31.46%	2,489
Ritchie	1,349	38.32%	1,773	50.37%	219	6.22%	179	5.09%	-424	-12.05%	3,520
Roane	1,709	51.69%	1,452	43.92%	123	3.72%	22	0.67%	257	7.77%	3,306
Summers	1,632	55.57%	1,233	41.98%	46	1.57%	26	0.89%	399	13.59%	2,937
Taylor	1,158	40.69%	1,522	53.48%	139	4.88%	27	0.95%	-364	-12.79%	2,846
Tucker	867	49.97%	830	47.84%	30	1.73%	8	0.46%	37	2.13%	1,735
Tyler	1,106	42.15%	1,449	55.22%	45	1.71%	24	0.91%	-343	-13.07%	2,624
Upshur	938	32.48%	1,849	64.02%	18	0.62%	83	2.87%	-911	-31.54%	2,888
Wayne	2,095	56.85%	1,514	41.09%	71	1.93%	5	0.14%	581	15.77%	3,685
Webster	737	67.31%	353	32.24%	5	0.46%	0	0.00%	384	35.07%	1,095
Wetzel	1,810	50.89%	1,183	33.26%	544	15.29%	20	0.56%	627	17.63%	3,557
Wirt	1,110	53.65%	926	44.76%	15	0.72%	18	0.87%	184	8.89%	2,069
Wood	2,985	46.78%	3,201	50.16%	117	1.83%	78	1.22%	-216	-3.39%	6,381
Wyoming	577	48.49%	591	49.66%	11	0.92%	11	0.92%	-14	-1.18%	1,190
Totals	84,467	49.37%	80,292	46.93%	4,167	2.44%	2,153	1.26%	4,175	2.44%	171,079

== See also ==
- United States presidential elections in West Virginia
