= 1976 United States presidential election in West Virginia =

- November 2, 1976
- Turnout: 69.2% (of registered voters) ▼57.1% (of voting age population) ▼

Nominee	Jimmy Carter	Gerald Ford
Party	Democratic	Republican
Running mate	Walter Mondale	Bob Dole
Electoral vote	6	0
Popular vote	435,914	314,760
Percentage	58.07%	41.93%
County results
Carter
50–60%
60–70%
70–80%
Ford
50–60%
60–70%

The 1976 United States presidential election in West Virginia took place on November 2, 1976, in West Virginia as part of the 1976 United States presidential election. The two major party candidates, Republican Gerald Ford and Democrat Jimmy Carter were the only candidates to appear on the state's ballot.

Carter won the state of West Virginia with 58.07 percent of the vote, carrying the state's 6 electoral votes. He had a 16.14 point margin over the incumbent President Ford. As of the 2024 presidential election, this is the last election in which Putnam County, Mineral County, and Hampshire County voted for a Democratic presidential candidate.

== Results ==
1976 United States presidential election in West Virginia
Party	Candidate	Votes	%
Democratic	Jimmy Carter	435,914	58.07%
Republican	Gerald Ford (inc.)	314,760	41.93%
Total votes		750,674	100.00%

=== Results by county ===
County	Jimmy Carter Democratic		Gerald Ford Republican		Margin		Total votes cast
County	#	%	#	%	#	%	Total votes cast
Barbour	3,647	52.99%	3,235	47.01%	412	5.98%	6,882
Berkeley	8,216	47.90%	8,935	52.10%	-719	-4.20%	17,151
Boone	8,528	73.52%	3,072	26.48%	5,456	47.04%	11,600
Braxton	4,012	67.71%	1,913	32.29%	2,099	35.42%	5,925
Brooke	8,197	63.11%	4,792	36.89%	3,405	26.22%	12,989
Cabell	20,811	51.44%	19,644	48.56%	1,167	2.88%	40,455
Calhoun	2,173	62.88%	1,283	37.12%	890	25.76%	3,456
Clay	2,662	67.49%	1,282	32.51%	1,380	34.98%	3,944
Doddridge	1,245	40.83%	1,804	59.17%	-559	-18.34%	3,049
Fayette	15,496	73.95%	5,459	26.05%	10,037	47.90%	20,955
Gilmer	2,245	62.09%	1,371	37.91%	874	24.18%	3,616
Grant	1,323	30.77%	2,976	69.23%	-1,653	-38.46%	4,299
Greenbrier	8,291	58.58%	5,862	41.42%	2,429	17.16%	14,153
Hampshire	3,104	59.68%	2,097	40.32%	1,007	19.36%	5,201
Hancock	10,627	61.08%	6,771	38.92%	3,856	22.16%	17,398
Hardy	2,993	61.70%	1,858	38.30%	1,135	23.40%	4,851
Harrison	21,467	58.59%	15,172	41.41%	6,295	17.18%	36,639
Jackson	5,334	49.88%	5,360	50.12%	-26	-0.24%	10,694
Jefferson	5,166	57.21%	3,864	42.79%	1,302	14.42%	9,030
Kanawha	53,602	55.94%	42,213	44.06%	11,389	11.88%	95,815
Lewis	3,960	51.46%	3,736	48.54%	224	2.92%	7,696
Lincoln	5,260	63.70%	2,997	36.30%	2,263	27.40%	8,257
Logan	13,122	76.54%	4,021	23.46%	9,101	53.08%	17,143
Marion	17,800	63.14%	10,391	36.86%	7,409	26.28%	28,191
Marshall	8,641	56.31%	6,705	43.69%	1,936	12.62%	15,346
Mason	6,769	56.53%	5,205	43.47%	1,564	13.06%	11,974
McDowell	10,557	71.99%	4,107	28.01%	6,450	43.98%	14,664
Mercer	14,761	57.77%	10,791	42.23%	3,970	15.54%	25,552
Mineral	5,898	53.48%	5,130	46.52%	768	6.96%	11,028
Mingo	8,655	74.20%	3,010	25.80%	5,645	48.40%	11,665
Monongalia	16,163	57.75%	11,827	42.25%	4,336	15.50%	27,990
Monroe	3,297	54.52%	2,750	45.48%	547	9.04%	6,047
Morgan	1,929	44.88%	2,369	55.12%	-440	-10.24%	4,298
Nicholas	6,235	64.30%	3,462	35.70%	2,773	28.60%	9,697
Ohio	11,817	48.64%	12,476	51.36%	-659	-2.72%	24,293
Pendleton	2,104	57.52%	1,554	42.48%	550	15.04%	3,658
Pleasants	1,699	51.38%	1,608	48.62%	91	2.76%	3,307
Pocahontas	2,330	57.25%	1,740	42.75%	590	14.50%	4,070
Preston	5,595	49.45%	5,719	50.55%	-124	-1.10%	11,314
Putnam	8,226	56.50%	6,334	43.50%	1,892	13.00%	14,560
Raleigh	19,768	65.02%	10,637	34.98%	9,131	30.04%	30,405
Randolph	7,265	60.11%	4,822	39.89%	2,443	20.22%	12,087
Ritchie	1,941	40.31%	2,874	59.69%	-933	-19.38%	4,815
Roane	3,519	52.25%	3,216	47.75%	303	4.50%	6,735
Summers	3,943	63.63%	2,254	36.37%	1,689	27.26%	6,197
Taylor	3,905	57.46%	2,891	42.54%	1,014	14.92%	6,796
Tucker	2,323	62.46%	1,396	37.54%	927	24.92%	3,719
Tyler	1,817	41.95%	2,514	58.05%	-697	-16.10%	4,331
Upshur	3,513	42.32%	4,789	57.68%	-1,276	-15.36%	8,302
Wayne	9,958	62.37%	6,009	37.63%	3,949	24.74%	15,967
Webster	2,931	75.12%	971	24.88%	1,960	50.24%	3,902
Wetzel	5,042	57.07%	3,793	42.93%	1,249	14.14%	8,835
Wirt	1,182	53.41%	1,031	46.59%	151	6.82%	2,213
Wood	17,075	48.16%	18,382	51.84%	-1,307	-3.69%	35,457
Wyoming	7,775	64.46%	4,286	35.54%	3,489	28.92%	12,061
Totals	435,914	58.07%	314,760	41.93%	121,154	16.14%	750,674

==== Counties that flipped from Republican to Democratic ====
- Boone
- Braxton
- Brooke
- Cabell
- Clay
- Fayette
- Hancock
- Hampshire
- Hardy
- Lewis
- Lincoln
- Marion
- Mason
- McDowell
- Mingo
- Mercer
- Mineral
- Monroe
- Pleasants
- Putnam
- Roane
- Webster
- Wyoming
- Wirt
- Barbour
- Calhoun
- Gilmer
- Greenbrier
- Harrison
- Jefferson
- Kanawha
- Marshall
- Monongalia
- Nicholas
- Pendleton
- Pocahontas
- Raleigh
- Randolph
- Summers
- Taylor
- Tucker
- Wayne
- Wetzel

=== By congressional district ===
Carter won all 4 of the state's congressional districts.

District	Carter	Ford	Representative
1st	55.5%	44.5%	Bob Mollohan
2nd	55.5%	44.5%	Harley Orrin Staggers
3rd	57.8%	42.2%	John M. Slack Jr.
4th	62.8%	37.2%	Ken Hechler
4th	62.8%	37.2%	Nick Rahall
