= 1948 United States presidential election in West Virginia =

- November 2, 1948

All 8 West Virginia votes to the Electoral College

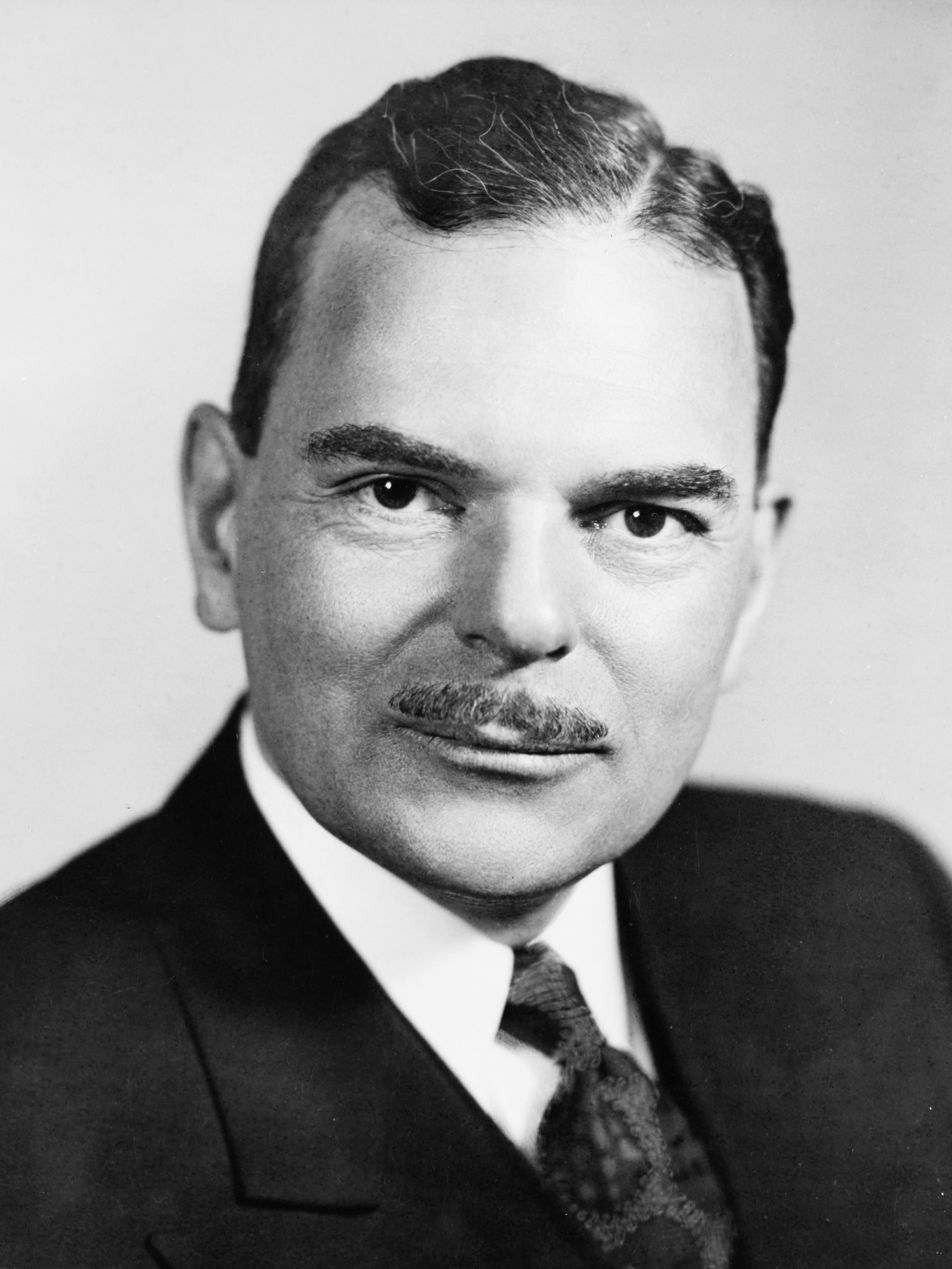
Nominee	Harry S. Truman	Thomas E. Dewey
Party	Democratic	Republican
Home state	Missouri	New York
Running mate	Alben W. Barkley	Earl Warren
Electoral vote	8	0
Popular vote	429,188	316,251
Percentage	57.32%	42.24%
County results
Truman
40–50%
50–60%
60–70%
70–80%
Dewey
40–50%
50–60%
60–70%
80–90%
President before election
Harry S. Truman
Democratic
Elected President
Harry S. Truman
Democratic

The 1948 United States presidential election in West Virginia took place on November 2, 1948, as part of the 1948 United States presidential election. West Virginia voters chose eight representatives, or electors, to the Electoral College, who voted for president and vice president.

West Virginia was won by incumbent President Harry S. Truman (D–Missouri), running with Kentucky Senator Alben W. Barkley, with 57.32 percent of the popular vote, against Governor Thomas E. Dewey (R–New York), running with Governor Earl Warren, with 42.24 percent of the popular vote.

The Progressive Party submitted 10,189 signatures, greater than the 7,155 required, and enough were validated to appear on the ballot. Their candidate in the concurrent gubernatorial election was removed from the ballot by a court ruling.

== Results ==
1948 United States presidential election in West Virginia
Party	Candidate	Votes	%
Democratic	Harry S. Truman (inc.)	429,188	57.32%
Republican	Thomas E. Dewey	316,251	42.24%
Progressive	Henry A. Wallace	3,311	0.44%
Total votes		748,750	100.00%

=== Results by county ===
1948 United States presidential election in West Virginia by county
County	Harry S. Truman Democratic		Thomas E. Dewey Republican		Henry A. Wallace Progressive		Margin		Total votes cast
County	#	%	#	%	#	%	#	%	Total votes cast
Barbour	4,238	52.32%	3,834	47.33%	28	0.35%	404	4.99%	8,100
Berkeley	6,797	52.80%	6,042	46.94%	34	0.26%	755	5.86%	12,873
Boone	6,769	69.81%	2,909	30.00%	19	0.20%	3,860	39.81%	9,697
Braxton	4,287	59.89%	2,864	40.01%	7	0.10%	1,423	19.88%	7,158
Brooke	6,680	63.55%	3,718	35.37%	114	1.08%	2,962	28.18%	10,512
Cabell	23,680	55.84%	18,599	43.86%	131	0.31%	5,081	11.98%	42,410
Calhoun	2,126	57.76%	1,549	42.08%	6	0.16%	577	15.68%	3,681
Clay	2,978	55.64%	2,366	44.21%	8	0.15%	612	11.43%	5,352
Doddridge	1,166	32.40%	2,433	67.60%	0	0.00%	-1,267	-35.20%	3,599
Fayette	21,707	74.14%	7,451	25.45%	120	0.41%	14,256	48.69%	29,278
Gilmer	2,355	62.37%	1,421	37.63%	0	0.00%	934	24.74%	3,776
Grant	664	19.06%	2,816	80.83%	4	0.11%	-2,152	-61.77%	3,484
Greenbrier	7,598	60.48%	4,935	39.29%	29	0.23%	2,663	21.20%	12,562
Hampshire	2,357	63.39%	1,351	36.34%	10	0.27%	1,006	27.06%	3,718
Hancock	8,242	63.53%	4,561	35.16%	170	1.31%	3,681	28.37%	12,973
Hardy	2,435	62.79%	1,433	36.95%	10	0.26%	1,002	25.84%	3,878
Harrison	21,109	59.03%	14,534	40.65%	114	0.32%	6,575	18.39%	35,757
Jackson	2,639	38.12%	4,277	61.78%	7	0.10%	-1,638	-23.66%	6,923
Jefferson	3,797	63.19%	2,199	36.60%	13	0.22%	1,598	26.59%	6,009
Kanawha	53,213	56.19%	41,144	43.45%	338	0.36%	12,069	12.75%	94,695
Lewis	3,477	41.69%	4,829	57.89%	35	0.42%	-1,352	-16.21%	8,341
Lincoln	4,433	52.07%	4,065	47.74%	16	0.19%	368	4.32%	8,514
Logan	16,121	68.43%	7,362	31.25%	76	0.32%	8,759	37.18%	23,559
Marion	19,866	63.35%	11,201	35.72%	290	0.92%	8,665	27.63%	31,357
Marshall	7,989	52.83%	6,986	46.20%	147	0.97%	1,003	6.63%	15,122
Mason	4,038	42.55%	5,453	57.45%	0	0.00%	-1,415	-14.91%	9,491
McDowell	21,545	68.46%	9,687	30.78%	240	0.76%	11,858	37.68%	31,472
Mercer	15,201	59.97%	10,065	39.71%	82	0.32%	5,136	20.26%	25,348
Mineral	4,586	50.98%	4,382	48.71%	28	0.31%	204	2.27%	8,996
Mingo	10,362	67.76%	4,896	32.02%	34	0.22%	5,466	35.74%	15,292
Monongalia	12,138	55.98%	9,329	43.02%	216	1.00%	2,809	12.95%	21,683
Monroe	2,632	47.10%	2,956	52.90%	0	0.00%	-324	-5.80%	5,588
Morgan	1,104	33.79%	2,159	66.09%	4	0.12%	-1,055	-32.29%	3,267
Nicholas	5,018	59.51%	3,391	40.22%	23	0.27%	1,627	19.30%	8,432
Ohio	16,995	51.27%	15,757	47.54%	395	1.19%	1,238	3.73%	33,147
Pendleton	1,944	54.87%	1,592	44.93%	7	0.20%	352	9.94%	3,543
Pleasants	1,536	49.56%	1,548	49.95%	15	0.48%	-12	-0.39%	3,099
Pocahontas	2,754	53.66%	2,373	46.24%	5	0.10%	381	7.42%	5,132
Preston	3,527	36.75%	6,020	62.73%	49	0.51%	-2,493	-25.98%	9,596
Putnam	4,426	54.21%	3,722	45.59%	16	0.20%	704	8.62%	8,164
Raleigh	19,697	65.09%	10,414	34.42%	148	0.49%	9,283	30.68%	30,259
Randolph	6,586	63.25%	3,802	36.52%	24	0.23%	2,784	26.74%	10,412
Ritchie	1,712	32.03%	3,619	67.71%	14	0.26%	-1,907	-35.68%	5,345
Roane	3,684	46.59%	4,213	53.28%	11	0.14%	-529	-6.69%	7,908
Summers	4,630	62.47%	2,782	37.53%	0	0.00%	1,848	24.93%	7,412
Taylor	3,888	49.40%	3,948	50.16%	35	0.44%	-60	-0.76%	7,871
Tucker	2,557	54.49%	2,102	44.79%	34	0.72%	455	9.70%	4,693
Tyler	1,579	33.22%	3,160	66.48%	14	0.29%	-1,581	-33.26%	4,753
Upshur	2,323	31.31%	5,068	68.31%	28	0.38%	-2,745	-37.00%	7,419
Wayne	7,618	63.32%	4,394	36.52%	19	0.16%	3,224	26.80%	12,031
Webster	3,726	70.74%	1,527	28.99%	14	0.27%	2,199	41.75%	5,267
Wetzel	4,477	57.18%	3,326	42.48%	26	0.33%	1,151	14.70%	7,829
Wirt	1,233	48.70%	1,291	50.99%	8	0.32%	-58	-2.29%	2,532
Wood	14,224	49.92%	14,198	49.83%	71	0.25%	26	0.09%	28,493
Wyoming	6,725	61.43%	4,198	38.34%	25	0.23%	2,527	23.08%	10,948
Totals	429,188	57.32%	316,251	42.24%	3,311	0.44%	112,937	15.08%	748,750

==== Counties that flipped from Republican to Democratic ====
- Barbour
- Berkeley
- Lincoln
- Marshall
- Mineral
- Putnam
- Wood

== See also ==
United States presidential elections in West Virginia

== Works cited ==
- Schmidt, Karl (1960). Henry A. Wallace: Quixotic Crusade 1948. Syracuse University Press.
