= 1940 United States presidential election in West Virginia =

- November 5, 1940

All 8 West Virginia votes to the Electoral College

Nominee	Franklin D. Roosevelt	Wendell Willkie
Party	Democratic	Republican
Home state	New York	New York
Running mate	Henry A. Wallace	Charles L. McNary
Electoral vote	8	0
Popular vote	495,662	372,414
Percentage	57.10%	42.90%
County results
Roosevelt
50–60%
60–70%
Willkie
50–60%
60–70%
70–80%
President before election
Franklin D. Roosevelt
Democratic
Elected President
Franklin D. Roosevelt
Democratic

The 1940 United States presidential election in West Virginia took place on November 5, 1940, as part of the 1940 United States presidential election. West Virginia voters chose eight representatives, or electors, to the Electoral College, who voted for president and vice president.

West Virginia was won by incumbent President Franklin D. Roosevelt (D–New York), running with Secretary Henry A. Wallace, with 57.10 percent of the popular vote, against Wendell Willkie (R–New York), running with Minority Leader Charles L. McNary, with 42.90 percent of the popular vote.

== Results ==
1940 United States presidential election in West Virginia
Party	Candidate	Votes	%
Democratic	Franklin D. Roosevelt (inc.)	495,662	57.10%
Republican	Wendell Willkie	372,414	42.90%
Total votes		868,076	100%

=== Results by county ===
1940 United States presidential election in West Virginia by county
County	Franklin D. Roosevelt Democratic		Wendell Willkie Republican		Margin		Total votes cast
County	#	%	#	%	#	%	Total votes cast
Barbour	5,025	52.34%	4,576	47.66%	449	4.68%	9,601
Berkeley	8,658	56.89%	6,562	43.11%	2,096	13.77%	15,220
Boone	7,904	65.69%	4,128	34.31%	3,776	31.38%	12,032
Braxton	5,709	58.46%	4,056	41.54%	1,653	16.93%	9,765
Brooke	6,416	61.57%	4,004	38.43%	2,412	23.15%	10,420
Cabell	28,125	57.22%	21,027	42.78%	7,098	14.44%	49,152
Calhoun	2,872	60.30%	1,891	39.70%	981	20.60%	4,763
Clay	3,485	54.74%	2,881	45.26%	604	9.49%	6,366
Doddridge	1,495	31.22%	3,293	68.78%	-1,798	-37.55%	4,788
Fayette	22,256	68.35%	10,307	31.65%	11,949	36.70%	32,563
Gilmer	3,276	61.31%	2,067	38.69%	1,209	22.63%	5,343
Grant	857	21.15%	3,195	78.85%	-2,338	-57.70%	4,052
Greenbrier	10,164	61.17%	6,451	38.83%	3,713	22.35%	16,615
Hampshire	3,277	65.18%	1,751	34.82%	1,526	30.35%	5,028
Hancock	8,515	63.02%	4,997	36.98%	3,518	26.04%	13,512
Hardy	2,690	61.64%	1,674	38.36%	1,016	23.28%	4,364
Harrison	22,570	56.91%	17,087	43.09%	5,483	13.83%	39,657
Jackson	3,299	39.26%	5,104	60.74%	-1,805	-21.48%	8,403
Jefferson	5,297	69.43%	2,332	30.57%	2,965	38.86%	7,629
Kanawha	57,932	59.09%	40,113	40.91%	17,819	18.17%	98,045
Lewis	4,566	43.48%	5,935	56.52%	-1,369	-13.04%	10,501
Lincoln	5,228	52.04%	4,818	47.96%	410	4.08%	10,046
Logan	17,010	63.30%	9,860	36.70%	7,150	26.61%	26,870
Marion	21,035	61.18%	13,349	38.82%	7,686	22.35%	34,384
Marshall	8,900	48.84%	9,324	51.16%	-424	-2.33%	18,224
Mason	4,521	42.02%	6,239	57.98%	-1,718	-15.97%	10,760
McDowell	24,449	63.74%	13,906	36.26%	10,543	27.49%	38,355
Mercer	18,163	61.45%	11,395	38.55%	6,768	22.90%	29,558
Mineral	5,195	50.30%	5,133	49.70%	62	0.60%	10,328
Mingo	11,619	66.80%	5,776	33.20%	5,843	33.59%	17,395
Monongalia	12,940	55.52%	10,367	44.48%	2,573	11.04%	23,307
Monroe	3,283	49.10%	3,403	50.90%	-120	-1.79%	6,686
Morgan	1,286	33.41%	2,563	66.59%	-1,277	-33.18%	3,849
Nicholas	5,312	55.27%	4,299	44.73%	1,013	10.54%	9,611
Ohio	21,713	54.57%	18,073	45.43%	3,640	9.15%	39,786
Pendleton	2,710	57.82%	1,977	42.18%	733	15.64%	4,687
Pleasants	1,779	48.41%	1,896	51.59%	-117	-3.18%	3,675
Pocahontas	3,604	55.53%	2,886	44.47%	718	11.06%	6,490
Preston	4,730	36.54%	8,213	63.46%	-3,483	-26.91%	12,943
Putnam	4,888	53.39%	4,268	46.61%	620	6.77%	9,156
Raleigh	23,105	66.29%	11,752	33.71%	11,353	32.57%	34,857
Randolph	8,465	66.86%	4,196	33.14%	4,269	33.72%	12,661
Ritchie	2,439	32.87%	4,982	67.13%	-2,543	-34.27%	7,421
Roane	5,158	49.24%	5,317	50.76%	-159	-1.52%	10,475
Summers	5,441	59.89%	3,644	40.11%	1,797	19.78%	9,085
Taylor	4,968	50.65%	4,841	49.35%	127	1.29%	9,809
Tucker	3,332	55.66%	2,654	44.34%	678	11.33%	5,986
Tyler	2,026	31.76%	4,354	68.24%	-2,328	-36.49%	6,380
Upshur	2,862	31.98%	6,086	68.02%	-3,224	-36.03%	8,948
Wayne	9,626	62.80%	5,701	37.20%	3,925	25.61%	15,327
Webster	4,579	68.90%	2,067	31.10%	2,512	37.80%	6,646
Wetzel	5,590	55.72%	4,443	44.28%	1,147	11.43%	10,033
Wirt	1,554	46.09%	1,818	53.91%	-264	-7.83%	3,372
Wood	15,962	51.55%	15,005	48.45%	957	3.09%	30,967
Wyoming	7,802	64.06%	4,378	35.94%	3,424	28.11%	12,180
Totals	495,662	57.10%	372,414	42.90%	123,248	14.20%	868,076

==== Counties that flipped from Democratic to Republican ====
- Lewis
- Marshall
- Monroe
- Pleasants
- Wirt
