= 1932 United States presidential election in West Virginia =

- November 8, 1932

All 8 West Virginia votes to the Electoral College

Nominee	Franklin D. Roosevelt	Herbert Hoover
Party	Democratic	Republican
Home state	New York	California
Running mate	John Nance Garner	Charles Curtis
Electoral vote	8	0
Popular vote	405,124	330,731
Percentage	54.47%	44.47%
County results
Roosevelt
40–50%
50–60%
60–70%
70–80%
Hoover
50–60%
60–70%
70–80%
President before election
Herbert Hoover
Republican
Elected President
Franklin D. Roosevelt
Democratic

The 1932 United States presidential election in West Virginia took place on November 8, 1932, as part of the 1932 United States presidential election. West Virginia voters chose eight representatives, or electors, to the Electoral College, who voted for president and vice president.

West Virginia was won by Governor Franklin D. Roosevelt (D–New York), running with Speaker John Nance Garner, with 54.47 percent of the popular vote, against incumbent President Herbert Hoover (R–California), running with Vice President Charles Curtis, with 44.47 percent of the popular vote.

Despite Roosevelt being the first Democrat to win a majority of West Virginia's vote since Grover Cleveland as far back as 1884, West Virginia was Hoover's tenth-best state by popular vote share and twelfth-best by percentage margin, voting overall 7.76 points more Republican than the nation at-large. The election nonetheless marked the beginning of West Virginia's transition to a strongly Democratic-leaning state during the 20th century. It voted Democratic in every election from 1932 through 1996 save the national Republican landslides of 1956, 1972, and 1984; it did not vote for a Republican in a close election until 2000 or for a losing Republican until 2008. Roosevelt was the first Democratic victor in Hancock County since James Buchanan in 1856, the first Democrat to win Monongalia County since Stephen A. Douglas in 1860, and the first Democratic victor in Brooke County since Horatio Seymour in 1868.

== Results ==
1932 United States presidential election in West Virginia
Party	Candidate	Votes	%
Democratic	Franklin D. Roosevelt	405,124	54.47%
Republican	Herbert Hoover (inc.)	330,731	44.47%
Socialist	Norman Thomas	5,133	0.69%
Prohibition	William David Upshaw	2,342	0.31%
Communist	William Z. Foster	444	0.06%
Total votes		743,774	100%

=== Results by county ===
1932 United States presidential election in West Virginia by county
County	Franklin D. Roosevelt Democratic		Herbert Hoover Republican		Norman Thomas Socialist		William D. Upshaw Prohibition		William Z. Foster Workers		Margin		Total votes cast
County	#	%	#	%	#	%	#	%	#	%	#	%	Total votes cast
Barbour	4,228	52.71%	3,652	45.52%	102	1.27%	37	0.46%	3	0.04%	576	7.18%	8,022
Berkeley	7,009	51.81%	6,370	47.09%	95	0.70%	51	0.38%	2	0.01%	639	4.72%	13,527
Boone	5,973	62.26%	3,555	37.06%	44	0.46%	19	0.20%	2	0.02%	2,418	25.21%	9,593
Braxton	6,043	62.55%	3,560	36.85%	16	0.17%	35	0.36%	7	0.07%	2,483	25.70%	9,661
Brooke	4,919	53.43%	4,010	43.56%	221	2.40%	37	0.40%	19	0.21%	909	9.87%	9,206
Cabell	23,498	56.01%	17,999	42.91%	318	0.76%	135	0.32%	0	0.00%	5,499	13.11%	41,950
Calhoun	3,139	66.45%	1,564	33.11%	3	0.06%	18	0.38%	0	0.00%	1,575	33.34%	4,724
Clay	3,038	55.25%	2,443	44.43%	12	0.22%	5	0.09%	1	0.02%	595	10.82%	5,499
Doddridge	1,943	41.14%	2,780	58.86%	0	0.00%	0	0.00%	0	0.00%	-837	-17.72%	4,723
Fayette	17,127	58.04%	12,170	41.24%	116	0.39%	91	0.31%	5	0.02%	4,957	16.80%	29,509
Gilmer	3,511	69.14%	1,530	30.13%	10	0.20%	27	0.53%	0	0.00%	1,981	39.01%	5,078
Grant	920	26.80%	2,477	72.15%	17	0.50%	18	0.52%	1	0.03%	-1,557	-45.35%	3,433
Greenbrier	9,467	64.47%	5,111	34.81%	63	0.43%	38	0.26%	5	0.03%	4,356	29.66%	14,684
Hampshire	3,681	73.80%	1,258	25.22%	16	0.32%	32	0.64%	1	0.02%	2,423	48.58%	4,988
Hancock	4,603	49.92%	4,328	46.94%	219	2.38%	48	0.52%	22	0.24%	275	2.98%	9,220
Hardy	2,824	68.61%	1,267	30.78%	5	0.12%	20	0.49%	0	0.00%	1,557	37.83%	4,116
Harrison	18,081	54.21%	14,641	43.90%	436	1.31%	165	0.49%	31	0.09%	3,440	10.31%	33,354
Jackson	4,131	50.29%	4,084	49.71%	0	0.00%	0	0.00%	0	0.00%	47	0.57%	8,215
Jefferson	5,350	75.15%	1,734	24.36%	18	0.25%	16	0.22%	1	0.01%	3,616	50.79%	7,119
Kanawha	38,617	51.61%	35,455	47.39%	595	0.80%	121	0.16%	33	0.04%	3,162	4.23%	74,821
Lewis	5,546	53.42%	4,704	45.31%	74	0.71%	55	0.53%	2	0.02%	842	8.11%	10,381
Lincoln	4,876	55.68%	3,881	44.32%	0	0.00%	0	0.00%	0	0.00%	995	11.36%	8,757
Logan	12,529	53.81%	10,683	45.88%	31	0.13%	29	0.12%	11	0.05%	1,846	7.93%	23,283
Marion	15,975	54.22%	12,638	42.89%	650	2.21%	168	0.57%	33	0.11%	3,337	11.33%	29,464
Marshall	7,994	51.09%	7,416	47.40%	132	0.84%	68	0.43%	37	0.24%	578	3.69%	15,647
Mason	5,027	51.52%	4,655	47.70%	40	0.41%	35	0.36%	1	0.01%	372	3.81%	9,758
McDowell	12,365	43.36%	16,069	56.35%	25	0.09%	45	0.16%	10	0.04%	-3,704	-12.99%	28,514
Mercer	15,900	58.69%	11,088	40.93%	44	0.16%	58	0.21%	3	0.01%	4,812	17.76%	27,093
Mineral	4,098	46.21%	4,519	50.95%	229	2.58%	20	0.23%	3	0.03%	-421	-4.75%	8,869
Mingo	8,657	52.46%	7,801	47.28%	14	0.08%	24	0.15%	5	0.03%	856	5.19%	16,501
Monongalia	10,319	53.69%	8,417	43.79%	366	1.90%	59	0.31%	60	0.31%	1,902	9.90%	19,221
Monroe	3,267	52.30%	2,978	47.67%	2	0.03%	0	0.00%	0	0.00%	289	4.63%	6,247
Morgan	1,358	38.99%	2,082	59.78%	28	0.80%	13	0.37%	2	0.06%	-724	-20.79%	3,483
Nicholas	5,327	58.56%	3,684	40.50%	21	0.23%	65	0.71%	0	0.00%	1,643	18.06%	9,097
Ohio	18,625	53.22%	15,836	45.25%	414	1.18%	86	0.25%	32	0.09%	2,789	7.97%	34,993
Pendleton	2,530	62.52%	1,502	37.11%	15	0.37%	0	0.00%	0	0.00%	1,028	25.40%	4,047
Pleasants	1,921	54.50%	1,580	44.82%	14	0.40%	9	0.26%	1	0.03%	341	9.67%	3,525
Pocahontas	3,531	57.00%	2,623	42.34%	14	0.23%	26	0.42%	1	0.02%	908	14.66%	6,195
Preston	4,872	42.94%	6,359	56.05%	78	0.69%	34	0.30%	3	0.03%	-1,487	-13.11%	11,346
Putnam	4,098	53.99%	3,411	44.94%	64	0.84%	16	0.21%	1	0.01%	687	9.05%	7,590
Raleigh	15,456	57.08%	11,441	42.25%	86	0.32%	43	0.16%	52	0.19%	4,015	14.83%	27,078
Randolph	7,397	67.72%	3,418	31.29%	61	0.56%	43	0.39%	4	0.04%	3,979	36.43%	10,923
Ritchie	3,179	43.45%	4,055	55.42%	25	0.34%	56	0.77%	2	0.03%	-876	-11.97%	7,317
Roane	5,094	53.88%	4,361	46.12%	0	0.00%	0	0.00%	0	0.00%	733	7.75%	9,455
Summers	5,724	63.53%	3,220	35.74%	32	0.36%	34	0.38%	0	0.00%	2,504	27.79%	9,010
Taylor	4,293	51.82%	3,856	46.54%	83	1.00%	47	0.57%	6	0.07%	437	5.27%	8,285
Tucker	3,244	58.45%	2,204	39.71%	62	1.12%	34	0.61%	6	0.11%	1,040	18.74%	5,550
Tyler	2,582	40.41%	3,734	58.44%	18	0.28%	49	0.77%	7	0.11%	-1,152	-18.03%	6,390
Upshur	3,147	37.95%	5,077	61.23%	37	0.45%	27	0.33%	4	0.05%	-1,930	-23.28%	8,292
Wayne	8,648	64.44%	4,682	34.89%	26	0.19%	62	0.46%	2	0.01%	3,966	29.55%	13,420
Webster	3,664	66.92%	1,781	32.53%	11	0.20%	19	0.35%	0	0.00%	1,883	34.39%	5,475
Wetzel	6,118	64.08%	3,351	35.10%	45	0.47%	30	0.31%	3	0.03%	2,767	28.98%	9,547
Wirt	1,944	55.93%	1,486	42.75%	8	0.23%	38	1.09%	0	0.00%	458	13.18%	3,476
Wood	13,294	51.78%	12,144	47.30%	93	0.36%	122	0.48%	20	0.08%	1,150	4.48%	25,673
Wyoming	4,396	52.31%	4,007	47.69%	0	0.00%	0	0.00%	0	0.00%	389	4.63%	8,403
Totals	405,124	54.47%	330,731	44.47%	5,133	0.69%	2,342	0.31%	444	0.06%	74,393	10.00%	743,774

==== Counties that flipped from Republican to Democratic ====
- Barbour
- Berkeley
- Brooke
- Cabell
- Clay
- Fayette
- Greenbrier
- Hancock
- Harrison
- Jackson
- Kanawha
- Lewis
- Lincoln
- Logan
- Marion
- Mason
- Marshall
- McDowell
- Mingo
- Mercer
- Monongalia
- Monroe
- Pleasants
- Nicholas
- Ohio
- Pocahontas
- Raleigh
- Putnam
- Roane
- Summers
- Taylor
- Tucker
- Wyoming
- Wirt
- Wood
- Wayne
- Wetzel
