= 1868 United States presidential election in West Virginia =

- November 3, 1868
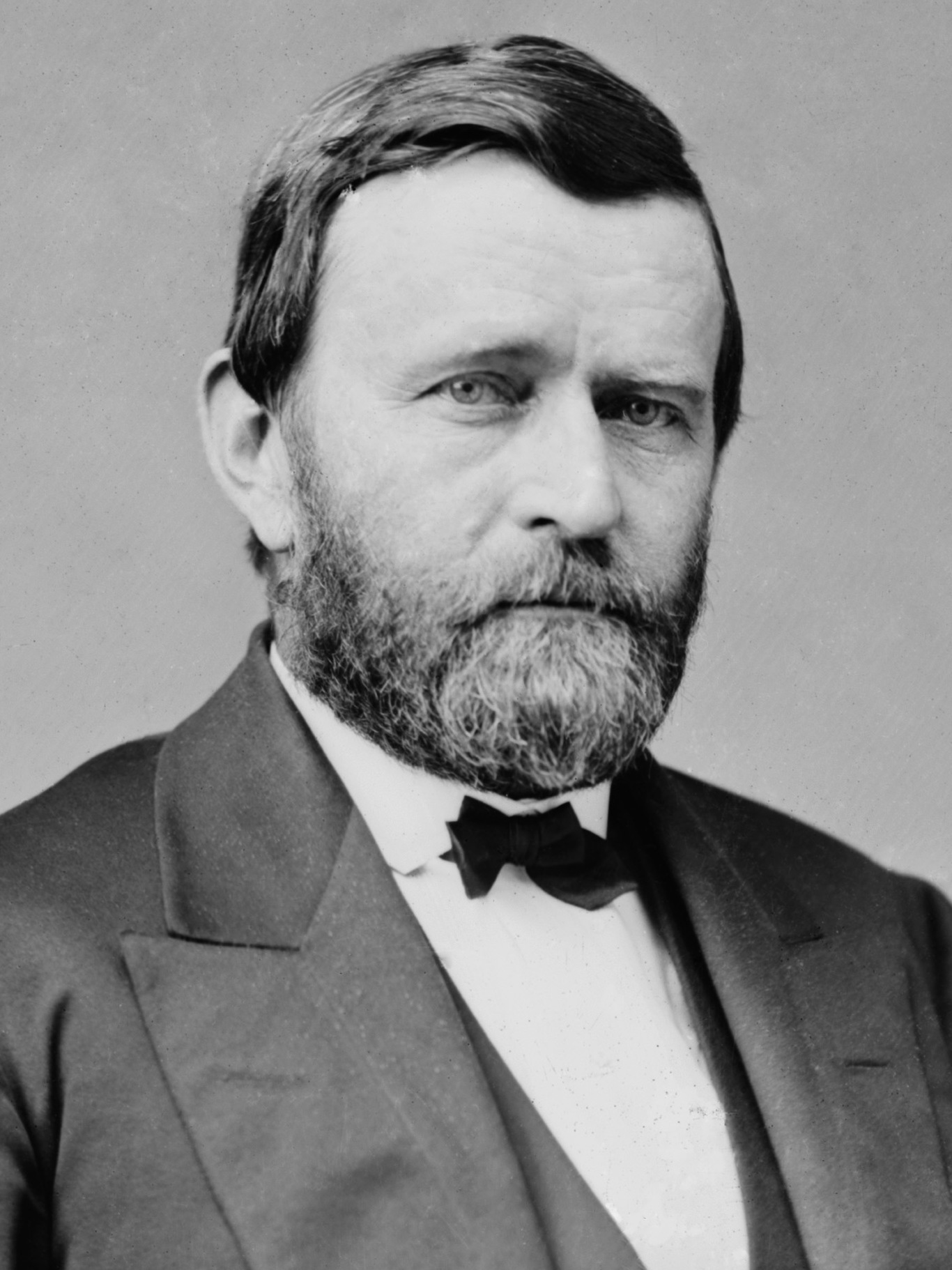

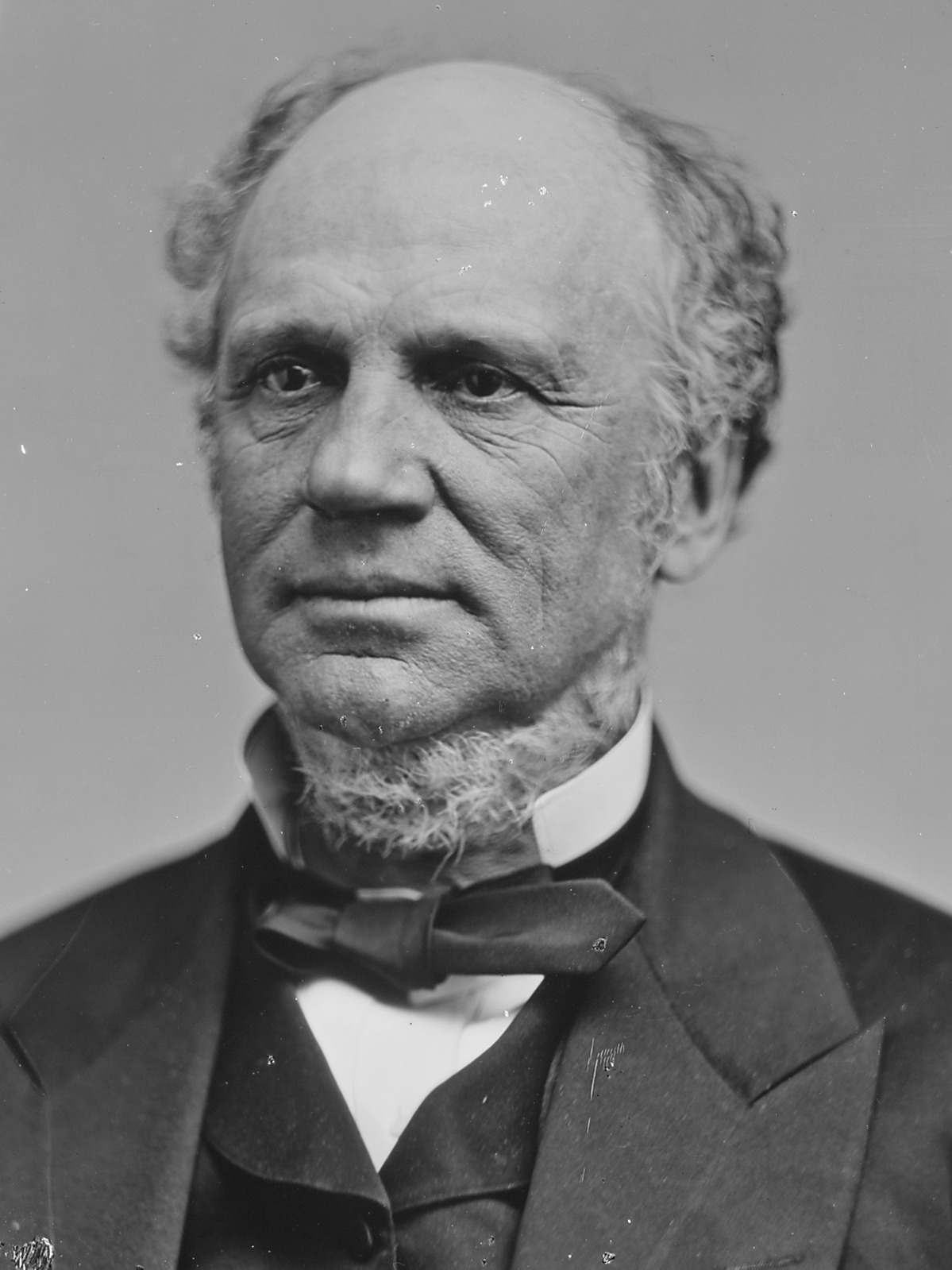
Nominee	Ulysses S. Grant	Horatio Seymour
Party	Republican	Democratic
Home state	Illinois	New York
Running mate	Schuyler Colfax	Francis Preston Blair Jr.
Electoral vote	5	0
Popular vote	29,015	20,306
Percentage	58.83%	41.17%
County results
Grant
50–60%
60–70%
70–80%
80–90%
90–100%
Seymour
50–60%
60–70%
70–80%
President before election
Andrew Johnson
Democratic
Elected President
Ulysses S. Grant
Republican

The 1868 United States presidential election in West Virginia took place on November 3, 1868, as part of the 1868 United States presidential election. State voters chose five representatives, or electors, to the Electoral College, who voted for president and vice president.

West Virginia was won by Ulysses S. Grant, formerly the 6th Commanding General of the United States Army (R-Illinois), running with Speaker of the House Schuyler Colfax, with 58.83 percent of the popular vote, against the 18th governor of New York, Horatio Seymour (D–New York), running with former Missouri Senator Francis Preston Blair Jr., with 41.17 percent of the vote.

During this time, West Virginia barred former Confederates from voting, requiring an oath of loyalty to the Union from all voters.

== Results ==
1868 United States presidential election in West Virginia
Party	Candidate	Running mate	Popular vote		Electoral vote	
Party	Candidate	Running mate	Count	%	Count	%
Republican	Ulysses S. Grant of Illinois	Schuyler Colfax of Indiana	29,015	58.83%	5	100.00%
Democratic	Horatio Seymour of New York	Francis Preston Blair Jr. of Missouri	20,306	41.17%	0	0.00%
Total			49,321	100.00%	5	100.00%

== See also ==
- United States presidential elections in West Virginia
