= 1880 United States presidential election in West Virginia =

- November 2, 1880
- Turnout: 18.21% of the total population
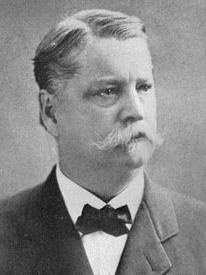

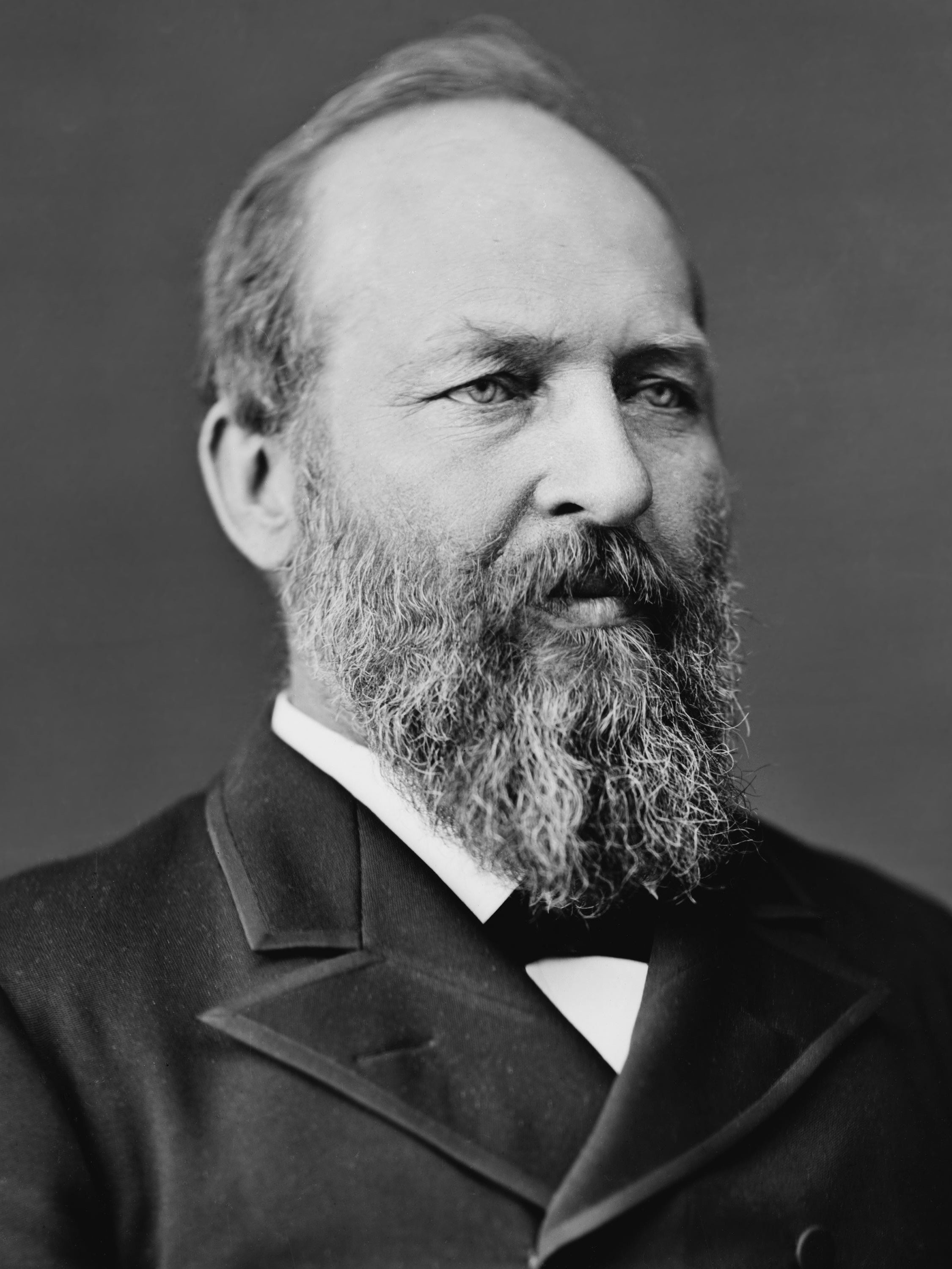

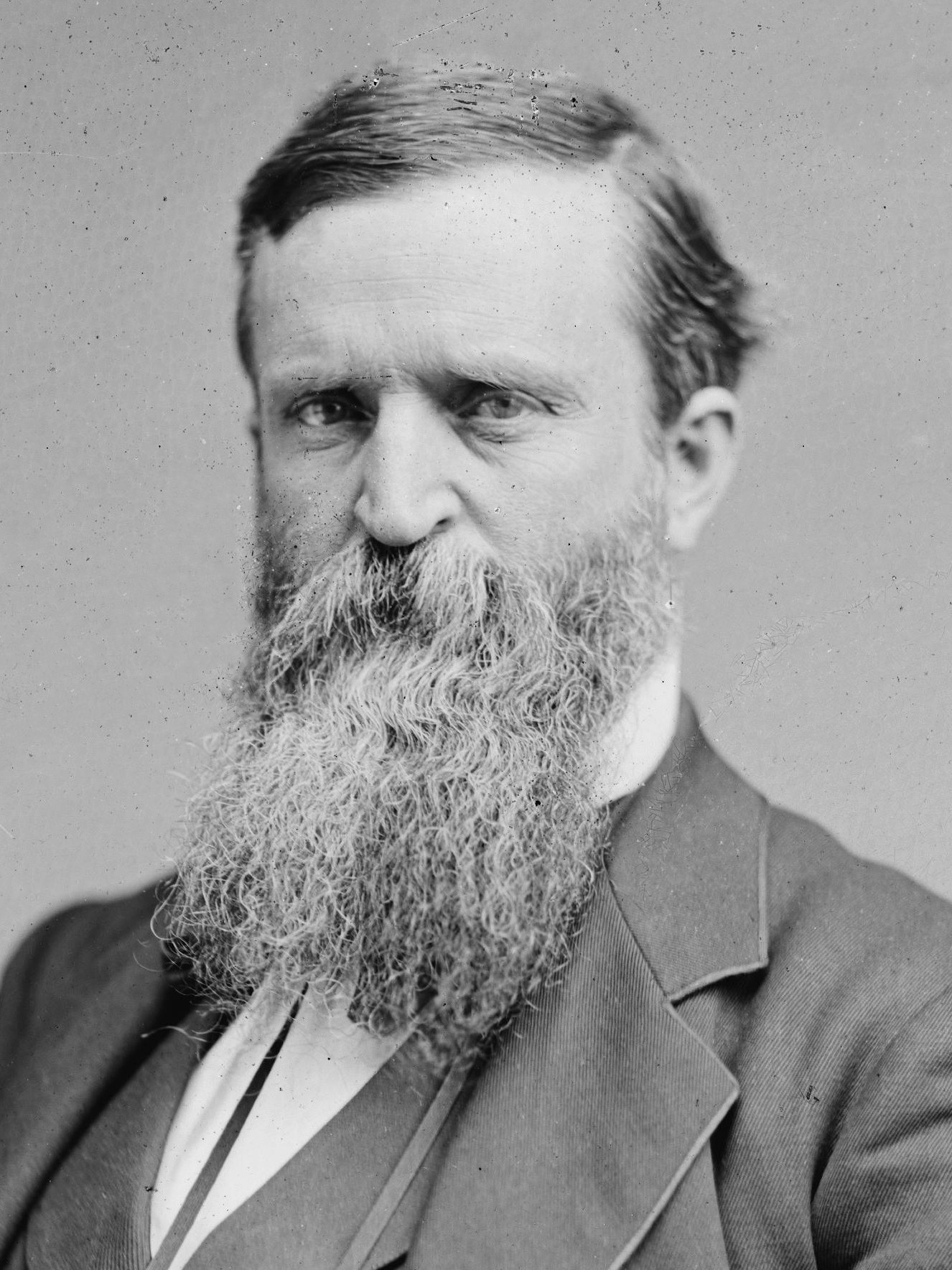
Nominee	Winfield Scott Hancock	James A. Garfield	James B. Weaver
Party	Democratic	Republican	Greenback
Home state	Pennsylvania	Ohio	Iowa
Running mate	William Hayden English	Chester A. Arthur	Barzillai J. Chambers
Electoral vote	5	0	0
Popular vote	57,390	46,243	9,008
Percentage	50.95%	41.05%	8.00%
County results
Hancock
30–40%
40–50%
50–60%
60–70%
70–80%
80–90%
90–100%
Garfield
40–50%
50–60%
60–70%
President before election
Rutherford B. Hayes
Republican
Elected President
James Garfield
Republican

The 1880 United States presidential election in West Virginia took place on November 2, 1880, as part of the 1880 United States presidential election. State voters chose five representatives, or electors, to the Electoral College, who voted for president and vice president.

West Virginia was won by General Winfield Scott Hancock (D–Pennsylvania), running with former Representative William Hayden English, with 50.95 percent of the popular vote, against Representative James Garfield (R-Ohio), running with the 10th chairman of the New York State Republican Executive Committee Chester A. Arthur, with 41.05 percent of the vote and representative James B. Weaver (G–Iowa), running with Barzillai J. Chambers, a former Confederate, with 8.00 percent of the popular vote.

== Results ==
1880 United States presidential election in West Virginia
Party	Candidate	Votes	%
Democratic	Winfield Scott Hancock	57,390	50.95%
Republican	James Garfield	46,243	41.05%
Greenback	James B. Weaver	9,008	8.00%
Total votes		112,641	100.00%

=== Results by county ===
1880 United States presidential election in West Virginia by county
County	Winfield Scott Hancock Democratic		James A. Garfield Republican		James B. Weaver Greenback		Margin		Total votes cast
County	#	%	#	%	#	%	#	%	Total votes cast
Barbour	1,017	48.20%	842	39.91%	251	11.90%	175	8.29%	2,110
Berkeley	1,619	48.18%	1,489	44.32%	252	7.50%	130	3.87%	3,360
Boone	508	60.62%	214	25.54%	116	13.84%	294	35.08%	838
Braxton	1,033	63.96%	518	32.07%	64	3.96%	515	31.89%	1,615
Brooke	626	50.61%	552	44.62%	59	4.77%	74	5.98%	1,237
Cabell	1,485	60.12%	928	37.57%	57	2.31%	557	22.55%	2,470
Calhoun	583	57.27%	330	32.42%	105	10.31%	253	24.85%	1,018
Clay	226	53.43%	158	37.35%	39	9.22%	68	16.08%	423
Doddridge	698	38.12%	771	42.11%	362	19.77%	-73	-3.99%	1,831
Fayette	1,263	52.63%	962	40.08%	175	7.29%	301	12.54%	2,400
Gilmer	835	60.55%	464	33.65%	80	5.80%	371	26.90%	1,379
Grant	320	34.37%	611	65.63%	0	0.00%	-291	-31.26%	931
Greenbrier	1,533	66.68%	636	27.66%	130	5.65%	897	39.02%	2,299
Hampshire	1,502	82.03%	329	17.97%	0	0.00%	1,173	64.06%	1,831
Hancock	439	42.70%	579	56.32%	10	0.97%	-140	-13.62%	1,028
Hardy	843	79.83%	213	20.17%	0	0.00%	630	59.66%	1,056
Harrison	1,736	42.16%	1,577	38.30%	805	19.55%	159	3.86%	4,118
Jackson	1,499	48.25%	1,537	49.47%	71	2.29%	-38	-1.22%	3,107
Jefferson	2,025	65.58%	1,018	32.97%	45	1.46%	1,007	32.61%	3,088
Kanawha	2,378	39.02%	2,112	34.66%	1,604	26.32%	266	4.36%	6,094
Lewis	1,217	51.20%	981	41.27%	179	7.53%	236	9.93%	2,377
Lincoln	635	57.41%	251	22.69%	220	19.89%	384	34.72%	1,106
Logan	835	90.08%	92	9.92%	0	0.00%	743	80.15%	927
Marion	1,703	48.44%	1,463	41.61%	350	9.95%	240	6.83%	3,516
Marshall	1,596	41.89%	2,186	57.38%	28	0.73%	-590	-15.49%	3,810
Mason	1,846	45.40%	1,853	45.57%	367	9.03%	-7	-0.17%	4,066
McDowell	242	82.88%	50	17.12%	0	0.00%	192	65.75%	292
Mercer	698	68.10%	55	5.37%	272	26.54%	426 (Note: In this county where Weaver ran second ahead of Garfield, margin given is Hancock vote minus Weaver vote and percentage margin Hancock percentage minus Weaver percentage.)	41.56%	1,025
Mineral	922	52.99%	772	44.37%	46	2.64%	150	8.62%	1,740
Monongalia	1,241	40.32%	1,753	56.95%	84	2.73%	-512	-16.63%	3,078
Monroe	1,134	57.27%	778	39.29%	68	3.43%	356	17.98%	1,980
Morgan	394	37.56%	655	62.44%	0	0.00%	-261	-24.88%	1,049
Nicholas	619	63.36%	315	32.24%	43	4.40%	304	31.12%	977
Ohio	4,066	50.10%	3,901	48.07%	149	1.84%	165	2.03%	8,116
Pendleton	760	64.63%	416	35.37%	0	0.00%	344	29.25%	1,176
Pleasants	641	54.97%	470	40.31%	55	4.72%	171	14.67%	1,166
Pocahontas	575	68.05%	258	30.53%	12	1.42%	317	37.51%	845
Preston	1,335	34.78%	2,347	61.15%	156	4.06%	-1,012	-26.37%	3,838
Putnam	830	41.50%	453	22.65%	717	35.85%	113	5.65%	2,000
Raleigh	563	60.73%	309	33.33%	55	5.93%	254	27.40%	927
Randolph	872	68.02%	364	28.39%	46	3.59%	508	39.63%	1,282
Ritchie	1,008	38.46%	1,238	47.23%	375	14.31%	-230	-8.78%	2,621
Roane	1,135	55.77%	593	29.14%	307	15.09%	542	26.63%	2,035
Summers	889	54.74%	637	39.22%	98	6.03%	252	15.52%	1,624
Taylor	1,055	43.79%	1,250	51.89%	104	4.32%	-195	-8.09%	2,409
Tucker	340	63.79%	189	35.46%	4	0.75%	151	28.33%	533
Tyler	930	42.78%	1,125	51.75%	119	5.47%	-195	-8.97%	2,174
Upshur	586	32.83%	995	55.74%	204	11.43%	-409	-22.91%	1,785
Wayne	1,305	65.78%	672	33.87%	7	0.35%	633	31.91%	1,984
Webster	357	80.04%	74	16.59%	15	3.36%	283	63.45%	446
Wetzel	1,720	65.67%	886	33.83%	13	0.50%	834	31.84%	2,619
Wirt	769	57.30%	534	39.79%	39	2.91%	235	17.51%	1,342
Wood	2,159	42.44%	2,287	44.96%	641	12.60%	-128	-2.52%	5,087
Wyoming	245	53.73%	201	44.08%	10	2.19%	44	9.65%	456
Totals	57,390	50.95%	46,243	41.05%	9,008	8.00%	11,147	9.90%	112,641

== See also ==
- United States presidential elections in West Virginia
