= Flag of West Virginia =

U.S. state flag

State of West Virginia
- West Virginia
- Use: Civil and state flag
- Proportion: 10:19
- Adopted: March 7, 1929; 97 years ago
- Design: A pure white field bordered on four sides by a stripe of blue with the coat of arms of West Virginia in the center, wreathed by Rhododendron maximum and topped by an unfurled red ribbon reading "State of West Virginia."

The state flag of the U.S. state of West Virginia was officially adopted by the West Virginia Legislature on March 7, 1929. Its design consists of a pure white field bordered by a blue stripe with the coat of arms of West Virginia in the center, wreathed by Rhododendron maximum and topped by an unfurled red ribbon reading, "State of West Virginia." It is the only state flag to bear crossing rifles, meant to illustrate the importance of the state's fight for liberty during the American Civil War as the southern unionist 35th state.

The first flags to represent West Virginia following statehood were battle flags utilized by West Virginia regiments during the American Civil War. West Virginia's first official state flag was adopted in 1905, based upon the flag designed and used by the West Virginia State Commission at the Louisiana Purchase Exposition in 1904. This flag was altered in 1907 for the Jamestown Exposition and featured the coat of arms on the obverse and a sprig of Rhododendron maximum on the reverse. In order to reproduce the flag more inexpensively, the West Virginia Legislature ratified the current flag with the state's coat of arms integrated with the rhododendron, which appears on both the obverse and the reverse.

The "Pledge of Allegiance to the West Virginia State Flag" was unanimously adopted by the office of the Secretary of State of West Virginia in 1977.

== Official description ==
The coat of arms of West Virginia, as stylized in the center of the present state flag.

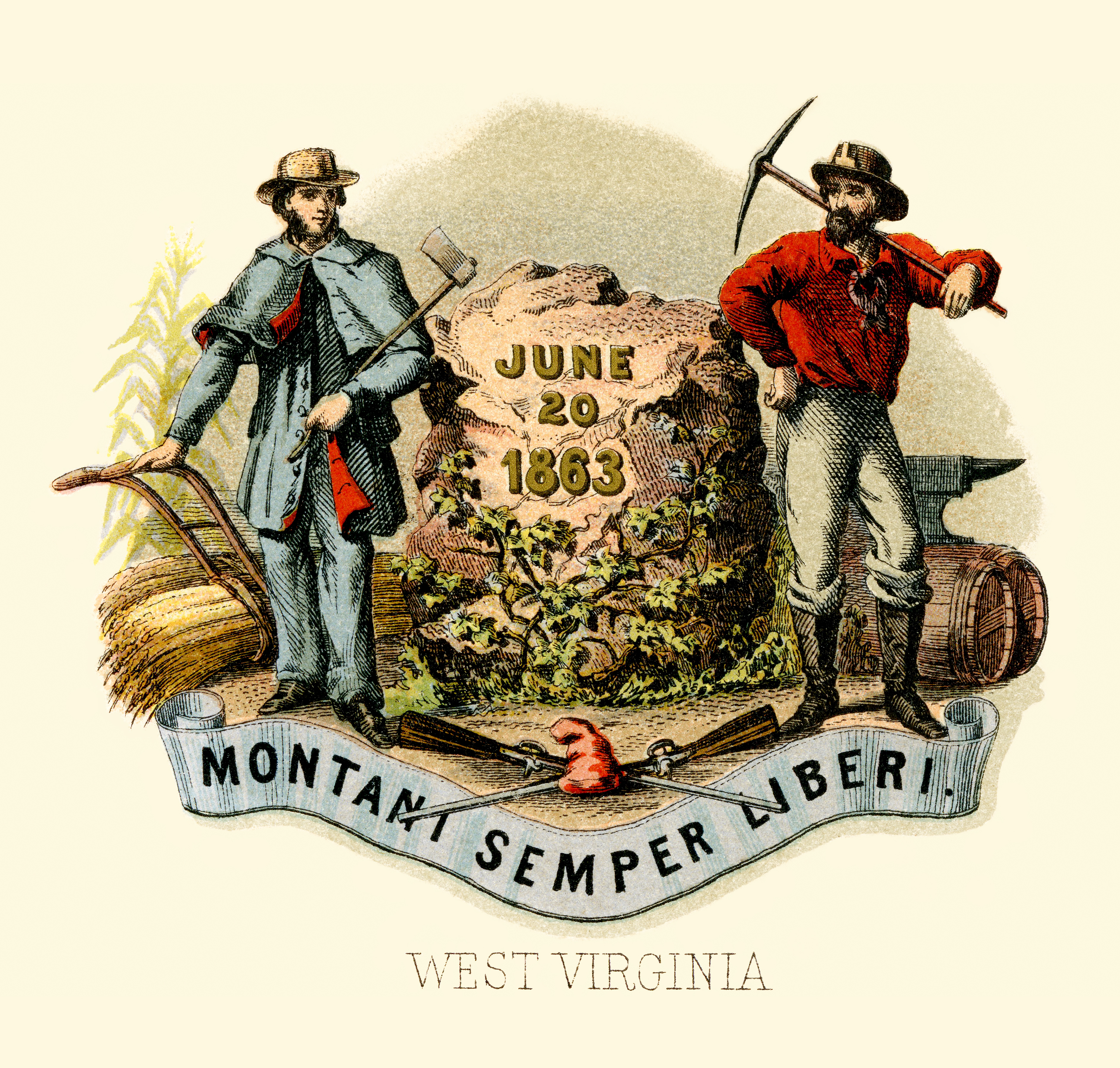
An 1876 rendering of West Virginia's coat of arms, based on the state seal.

The 1929 West Virginia Senate Joint Resolution No. 18 defines the state flag as follows:

The proportions of the flag of the State of West Virginia shall be the same as those of the United States ensign; the field shall be pure white, upon the center of which shall be emblazoned in proper colors, the coat-of-arms of the State of West Virginia upon which appears the date of the admission of the State into the Union, also with the motto, 'Montani Semper Liberi' (Mountaineers Are Always Free). Above the coat-of-arms of the State of West Virginia there shall be a ribbon lettered, 'State of West Virginia,' and arranged appropriately around the lower part of the coat-of-arms of the State of West Virginia a wreath of Rhododendron maximum in proper colors. The field of pure white shall be bordered by a strip of blue on four sides.

== Symbolism ==
The current state flag of West Virginia consists of a pure white field bordered on four sides by a stripe of blue. The white of the field symbolizes purity, while the blue border represents the Union. The center of the state flag is emblazoned with the state's coat of arms, a stylized version of the Great Seal of West Virginia. The lower half of the state flag is wreathed by two tethered swags of Rhododendron maximum, the state flower of West Virginia. Across the top of the state flag is an unfurled red ribbon with the constitutional designation "State of West Virginia", and across the bottom of the state flag is a tied red ribbon with the state's Latin motto Montani Semper Liberi (English: "mountaineers are always free").

The state's coat of arms in the center of the flag symbolizes the principal pursuits and resources of West Virginia. In the center is an ivy-draped boulder that has been inscribed "June 20, 1863," the date of West Virginia's admission to the Union as a state. In front of the boulder lie two crossed hunting rifles and a Phrygian cap (or "Cap of Liberty") to illustrate the importance of the state's fight for liberty. Two men, a farmer and a miner, stand on either side of the boulder and represent agriculture and industry. The farmer stands on the left with an ax and plow before a cornstalk and a sheaf of wheat. The miner stands on the right with a pickaxe and, behind him, two barrels, an anvil and sledge hammer.

== History ==
Prior to the adoption of the current state flag of West Virginia, the state had been represented by a number of flags since attaining statehood in 1863, all of which proved impractical. The first West Virginia Legislature commissioned Joseph H. Diss Debar of Doddridge County to design the Great Seal of West Virginia in 1863. On September 26, 1863, the West Virginia Legislature officially adopted the seal designed by Diss Debar, a stylized version of which was also designated the state's coat of arms. Despite the adoption of an official seal, the state did not decide upon an official state flag until 1905.

=== American Civil War ===
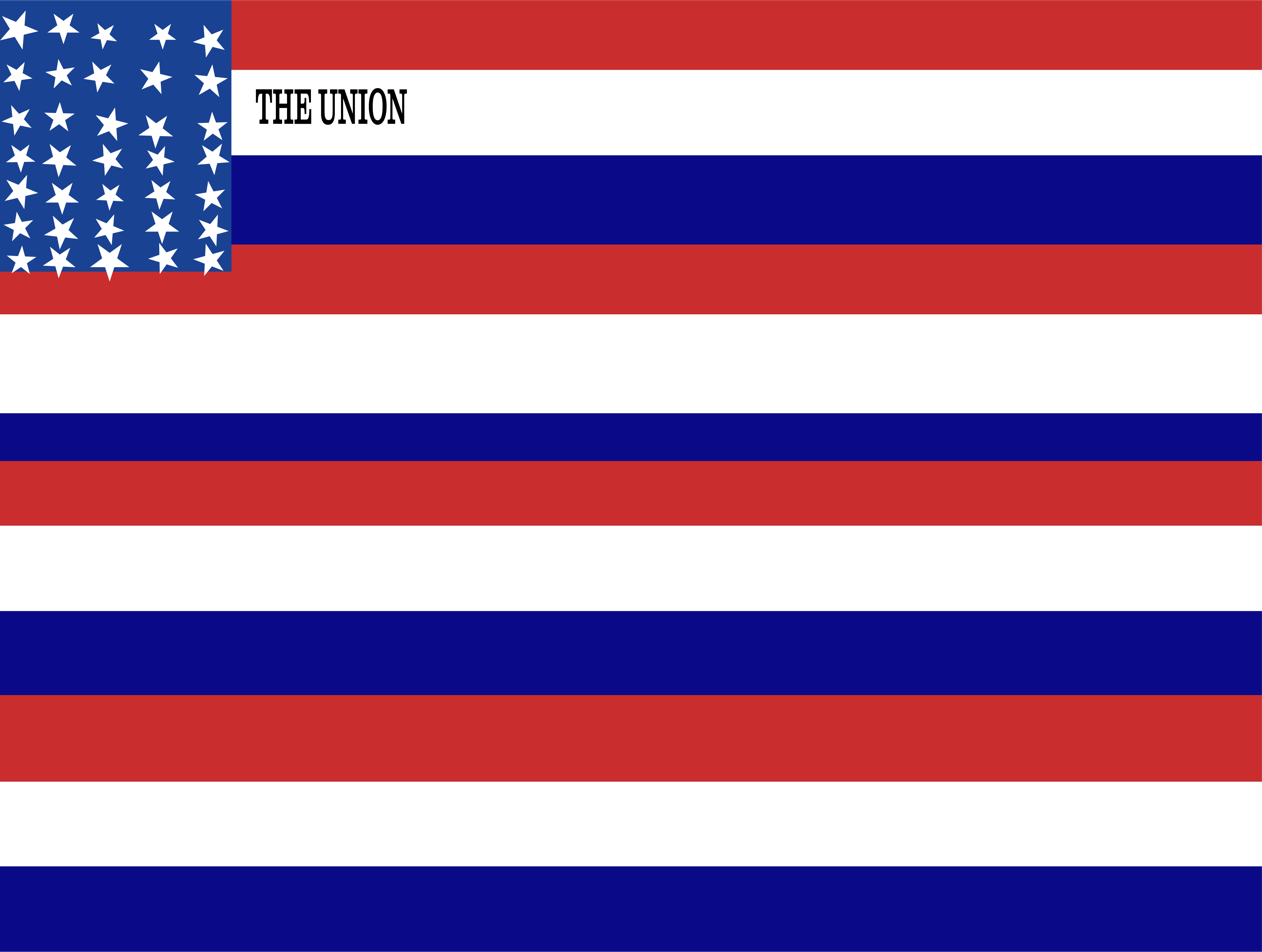
Digital reconstruction of a handmade 35-star statehood flag, c. 1863.

Prior to West Virginia's separation from Virginia on June 20, 1863, pro-Union supporters in western Virginia created unique flags to show their support for the Union cause. In January 1861, the residents of Kingwood erected a flagpole measuring about 105 feet (32 m) in height, and on it they hoisted a handmade streamer with the word "UNION" prior to Virginia's secession. During the war, western Virginia regiments in the Union Army carried flags handmade by supportive women, as was the case with the Fifth Regiment Virginia Volunteer Infantry who carried a flag bearing the legend "5th Va. Regiment" in 1861.

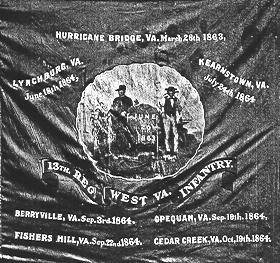
Regimental flag of the 13th West Virginia Infantry

A version of the United States national emblem

In January 1864, the West Virginia Legislature approved a flag for the Fourth Regiment West Virginia Volunteer Infantry to acknowledge the regiment's battles at Charleston, Vicksburg, Jackson, and Missionary Ridge, all four of which were listed on the flag. This was the first among many battle flags to represent West Virginia after statehood which were utilized by soldiers of West Virginia regiments throughout the war. State battle flags were presented to each of West Virginia's Union regiments during the course of the war. These early state flags were squares of silk cloth measuring 6 feet (1.8 m), and were dark blue and trimmed with golden fringe. The obverse side of these flags were painted with the state's newly minted seal within an oval, along with the name of the respective West Virginia regiment and the names and dates of the battles in which they had participated. On the reverse side, the United States national emblem was painted and consisted of a bald eagle with its wings outstretched, clutching a bundle of 13 arrows in its right talon and an olive branch in its left, and a tricolor shield placed across its breast. In its beak, the eagle clutched a scroll with the national Latin motto E pluribus unum (English: "Out of Many, One"). Following the conclusion of the American Civil War, the state of West Virginia had no official flag, and the matter was not taken up until the early 20th century.

=== 1905 flag ===
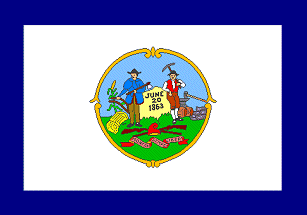
The obverse (top) and reverse side (bottom) of the West Virginia state flag from 1905 to 1907.

The need for an official state flag arose in 1904 when the West Virginia State Commission to the Louisiana Purchase Exposition in St. Louis reported that the state required a flag or ensign to represent and distinguish itself among the other U.S. states at the exposition. In lieu of an official state flag, the commission adopted and used a state flag of its own design at the West Virginia building at the exposition, which was a "sprig of mountain laurel upon an immaculate white field with a pale blue border".

The idea however, of adopting a state flag, or the need of one, had arisen earlier. In 1901, Secretary to the Governor Mr. Boggs sent a flag to the New York Association of Ladies for decorative use at a charitable bazaar, where it was also to be sold at auction. Because the state lacked an official flag, Boggs commissioned a workaround: a regular national flag bearing the state's coat of arms. This drew attention to West Virginia's absence of a distinct emblem and highlighted the growing recognition that the state needed a proper flag for public display and representation alongside the other states.

In its report to the West Virginia Legislature, the West Virginia State Commission recommended the adoption of their flag design as the official state flag. On February 24, 1905, the West Virginia Legislature ratified the commission's flag design following its passage of Joint Resolution Number 16 during the gubernatorial administration of Albert B. White. The legislature adopted the commission's flag design, with the addition of a fringe or border of carmine red. The state flag was approved by the legislature to be employed on occasions where a special display of the state's individuality was necessary or regarded as appropriate. According to the 1905 joint resolution:

Said state flag shall be in length and breadth in the proportion of nine to thirteen, this being the same as the flag of the great American Republic of which West Virginia forms a part; the field thereof shall be pure white, upon the center of which shall be a sprig of the rhododendron maximum or "big laurel," having flowers and leaves; and on the reverse side shall be the state coat-of-arms and the motto; the field of pure white shall be bordered by a band or strip of blue, and this in turn shall be bordered by a strip of fringe of carmine red; and said flag shall be regarded and used as the West Virginia state flag on all occasions where a special display of the state's individuality shall become necessary, or be regarded as appropriate.

Following its formal adoption by the legislature, schools and other institutions throughout West Virginia began flying the new state flag. The teachers and students at the schools in Ronceverte purchased the new state flag in June 1906, which measured 5.5 feet (1.7 m) in length, and used it along with the United States flag for salutes and patriotic exercises.

=== 1907 flag ===
The obverse (top) and reverse side (bottom) of the West Virginia state flag from 1907 to 1929.

By 1907, the West Virginia Legislature found the 1905 state flag design to be completely unfeasible due to the lettering on one side reading toward the staff, and the differing colors on each respective side showing through the opposite side of the flag's white field of cloth. The state legislature found that this destroyed "the distinctive features of the banner and leaving the state without a prescribed official flag". The West Virginia Legislature sought to remedy the state flag's design flaws in 1907 so that the state could be properly represented at the Jamestown Exposition in Norfolk. On February 25, 1907, during the administration of Governor William M. O. Dawson, the West Virginia Legislature passed Joint Resolution 2, which amended the flag by removing the seal and motto from the reverse side and changing the color of the bordering fringe from carmine red to old gold. Instead of the seal and motto, the reverse of the flag was changed to consist of "a spring or sprig of the rhododendron maximum". According to the 1907 joint resolution:

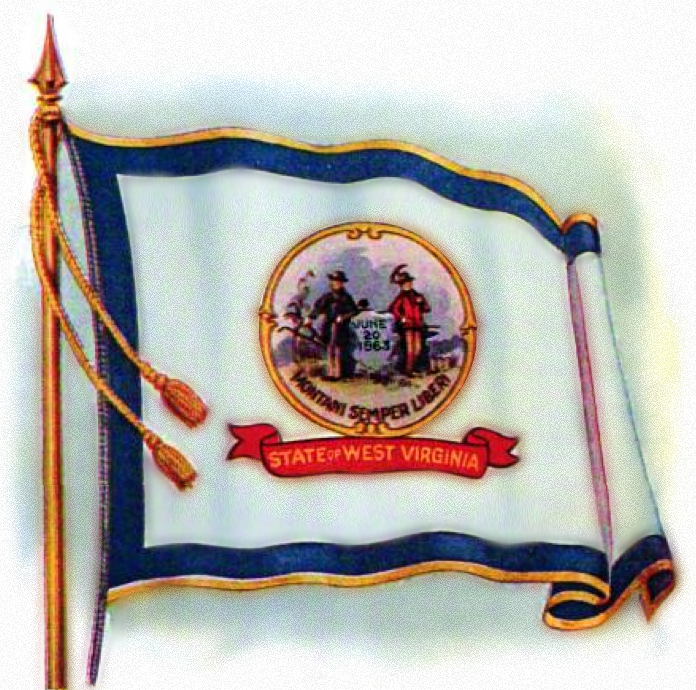
The obverse of the 1907 state flag as illustrated in the West Virginia Legislative Hand Book and Manual and Official Register (1922).

Said state flag shall be in length and breadth in proportion the same as the flag of the great American Republic of which West Virginia forms a part; the field thereof shall be pure white, upon the center of which on the obverse side shall be the great seal or coat of arms of the state, beneath which shall appear the legend "State of West Virginia," in a scroll; on the reverse side shall appear a sprig or sprigs of the rhododendron maximum, or big laurel, our state flower, having blossoms and leaves; the field of pure white shall be bordered by a band or strip of blue, and this in turn shall be bordered by a strip or fringe of old gold; and said flag shall be regarded and used as the West Virginia state flag on all occasions where a special display of the state's individuality shall become necessary, or be regarded as appropriate.

=== Current flag (1929–present) ===
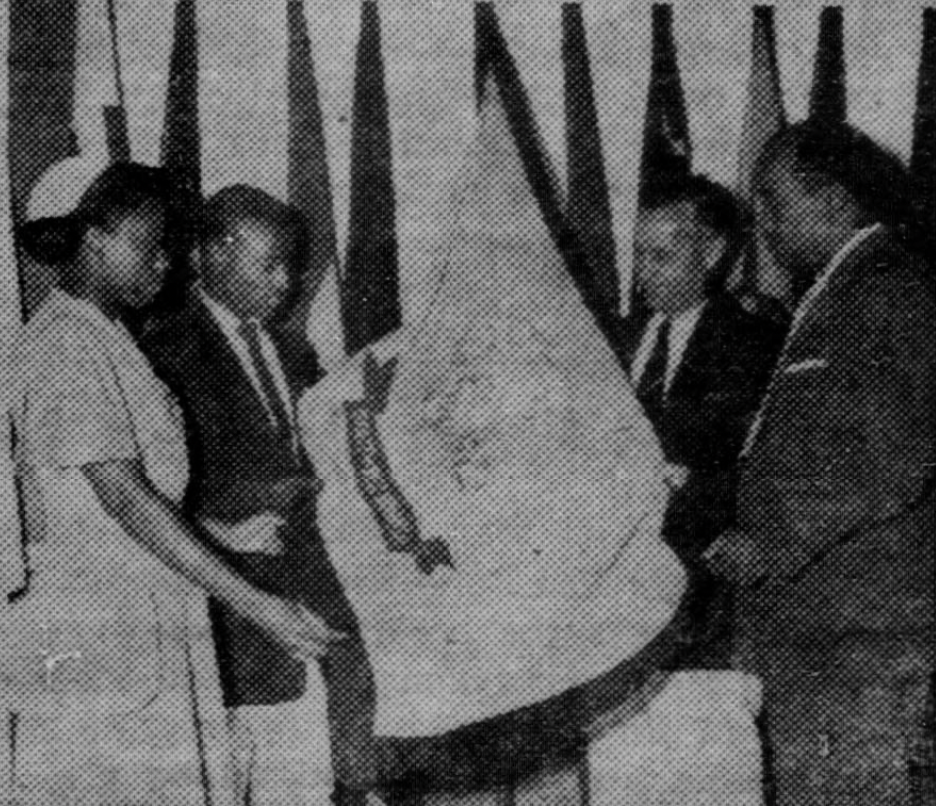
State flag from 1955

The flag design ratified in 1907 remained the state's official flag until 1929. The state of West Virginia sought a flag design that could be produced inexpensively so that the state flag could be mass-produced for the state's public schools. The 1907 flag proved to be more costly to reproduce due to the two different symbols on each side of the banner, the state's coat of arms on the obverse and the state's flower on the reverse. The West Virginia Legislature decided the state flag should be stamped with a design that would integrate both the coat of arms and the state flower on both sides. The design of the present state flag was officially adopted by the West Virginia Legislature on March 7, 1929, by West Virginia Senate Joint Resolution Number 18.

In 2001, the North American Vexillological Association surveyed its members and other flag enthusiasts on the designs of the 72 U.S. state, U.S. territorial, and Canadian provincial flags. Members ranked the West Virginia state flag at 51 out of the 72 flags surveyed.

== Usage and protocol ==
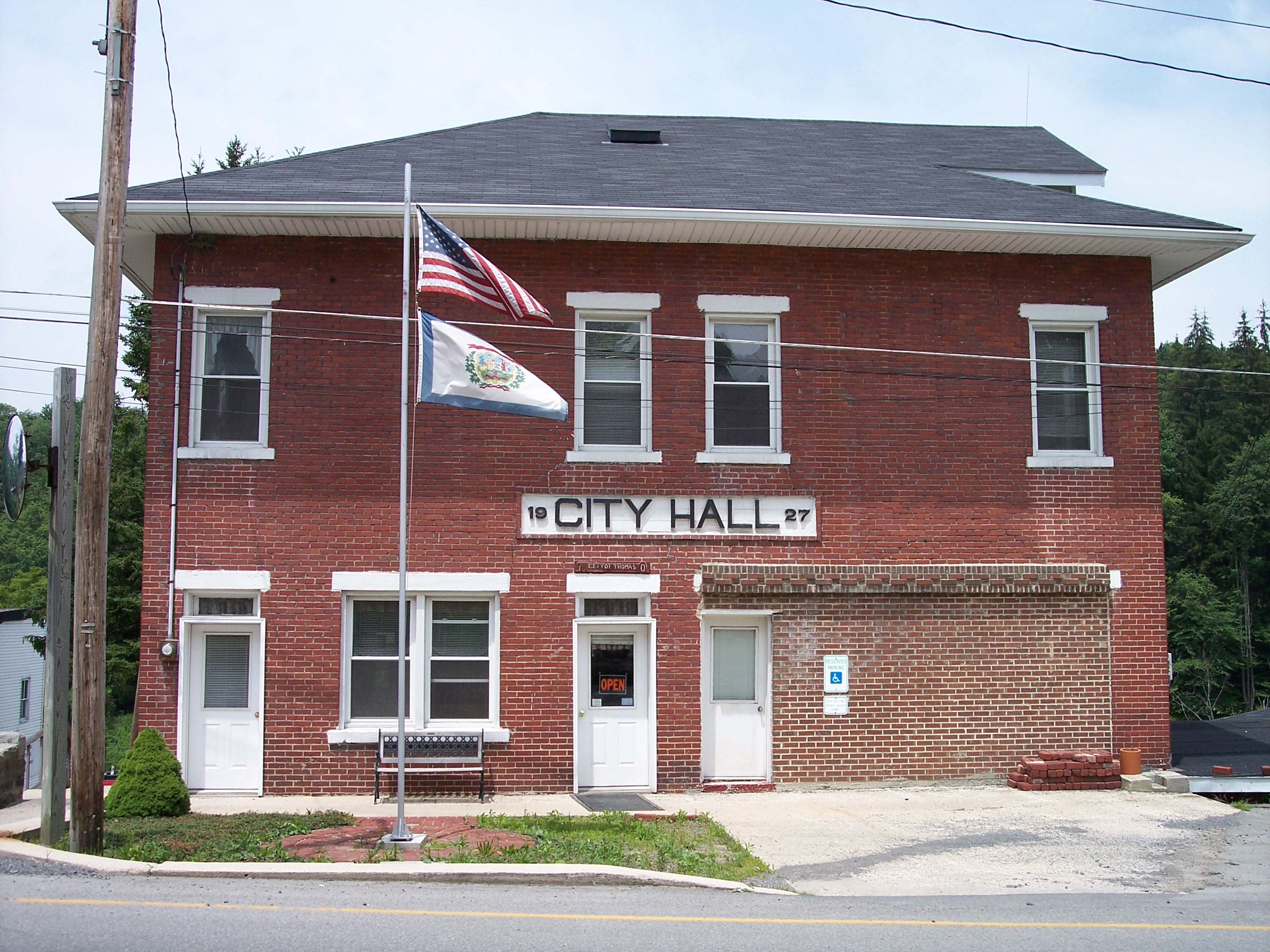
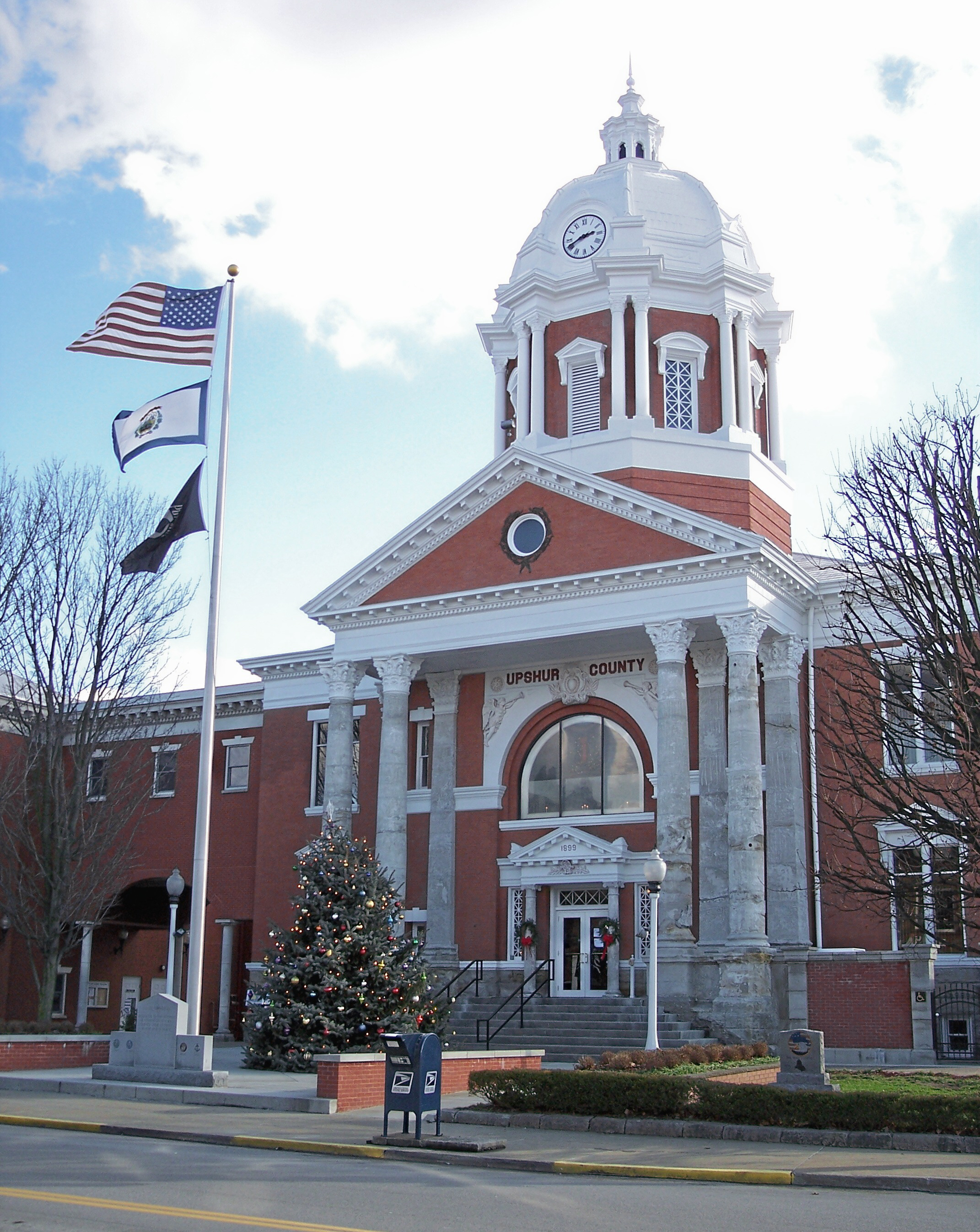
The United States and West Virginia state flags flying together in front of City Hall in Thomas (top) and in front of the Upshur County Courthouse in Buckhannon (bottom).

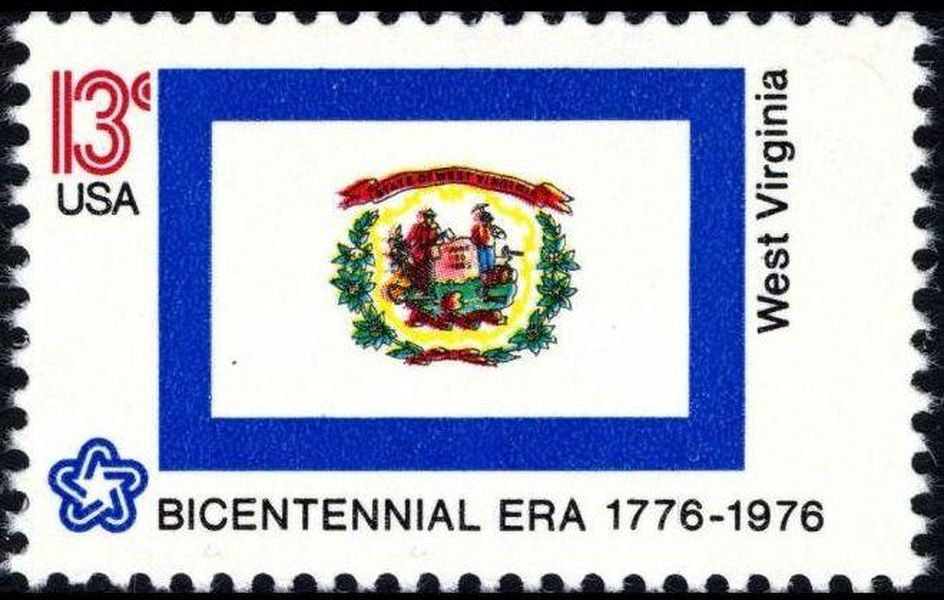
The West Virginia state flag as depicted in the 1976 bicentennial postage stamp series.

The West Virginia Legislature has passed a series of laws in the West Virginia Code governing the usage of the West Virginia state flag. The state flag is not permitted to be placed above, or if on the same level, to the right of the United States flag. Both the United States and West Virginia state flags are to be flown over the West Virginia State Capitol building year-round. Any United States or West Virginia state flag purchased with state funds must be manufactured in the United States; and West Virginia county boards of education must only purchase state flags manufactured in the United States if board building funds are used. To honor the death of law-enforcement officers within the state, the West Virginia Code permits the draping of the state flag over the coffin at no cost, upon the request of the next-of-kin.

The state flag's proportions are identical to those of the flag of the United States. When utilized for parade purposes, all but the staff side of the state flag are to be trimmed with gold fringe. When used concurrently with the flag of the United States during ceremonial occasions, the state flag is trimmed and mounted like the United States flag with regard to fringe, cord, tassels, and mounting.

=== Half-mast protocol ===
Effective July 18, 2013, the office of West Virginia Governor Earl Ray Tomblin established guidelines in accordance with the United States Code and West Virginia precedent and customs regarding the half-mast display of United States and West Virginia state flags on West Virginia state properties. Both the United States and West Virginia state flags are to be hoisted to full-mast, before being lowered to the half-mast position; likewise both flags are to be hoisted full-mast prior to being lowered for the day. Both flags are only to be displayed in the half-mast position in accordance with Federal law on the following occasions:

- Memorial Day (the last Monday in May): flags are displayed at half-mast from sunrise until noon, then raised to full-mast.
- Peace Officers Memorial Day (May 15): flags are displayed at half-mast for the entire day, unless that day is also Armed Forces Day (the third Saturday in May).
- Patriot Day (September 11): flags are displayed at half-mast for the entire day.
- National Pearl Harbor Remembrance Day (December 7): flags are displayed at half-mast for the entire day.
- Flags are displayed at half-mast for 30 days following the day of death of either a current or former President of the United States.
- Flags are displayed at half-mast for ten days following the day of death of the Vice President of the United States, the Chief Justice or retired Chief Justice of the United States, or the Speaker of the United States House of Representatives.
- Flags are displayed at half-mast from the day of death until the day of interment of a former vice president, an Associate Justice of the Supreme Court, a Secretary of an executive or military department of the United States, or a Governor of a U.S. state, territory, or possession.
- Flags are displayed at half-mast on the day of death and the following day for a member of the United States Congress.
- Flags displayed at half-mast on state properties following a proclamation by the Governor of West Virginia during other unique instances outlined in the 2013 guidelines.

=== Desecration ===
According to West Virginia state law, the desecration of either the flag of the United States or the West Virginia state flag is an offense punishable as a misdemeanor and upon conviction, a guilty verdict can result in a fine "not less than five nor more than one hundred dollars," or confinement in jail "for a period not exceeding thirty days" at "the discretion of the court or justice trying the case."

However, such laws are unenforceable as the United States Supreme Court in Texas v. Johnson, 491 U.S. 397 (1989), and reaffirmed in U.S. v. Eichman, 496 U.S. 310 (1990), has ruled that due to the First Amendment to the United States Constitution, it is unconstitutional for a government (whether federal, state, or municipality) to prohibit the desecration of a flag, due to its status as "symbolic speech."

== Pledge of allegiance ==
On February 8, 1977, the office of the Secretary of State of West Virginia unanimously adopted the "Pledge of Allegiance to the West Virginia State Flag." The motion to adopt the pledge was made by Charles S. Smith and seconded by Carol J. Calvert. The pledge reads as follows:

I pledge allegiance to the flag of West Virginia, which serves as a constant reminder that "Mountaineers Are Always Free," which stands as a symbol of her majestic mountains, fertile forests, rich veins of coal, and the pride of her people.

== Other flags ==
None of these flags were every officially adopted by the state legislature. There were many unofficial flags use to represent the state before 1905. With none of them ever becoming popular with the public.

In 1875, a state military committee started a contest to design a flag for used by the national guard. One proposed design was sent by a lady named Mrs. Miller. It had stripes of green, white, black, drab, and blue. With a red canton bearing the state's coat of arms in gold. In November they selected a design that measured 3 x 9 feet. It bore 4 stripes of red and buff, with a white canton. In the middle of the canton was the state's coat of arms in gold. The banner was made by a lady from Monroe County. A little silk flag displaying the design was pinned to the flag report. The design was later sent to state legislature with a symbolic vote on the house floor. Although the flag was never officially adopted with no funds being set aside for production of the banner.

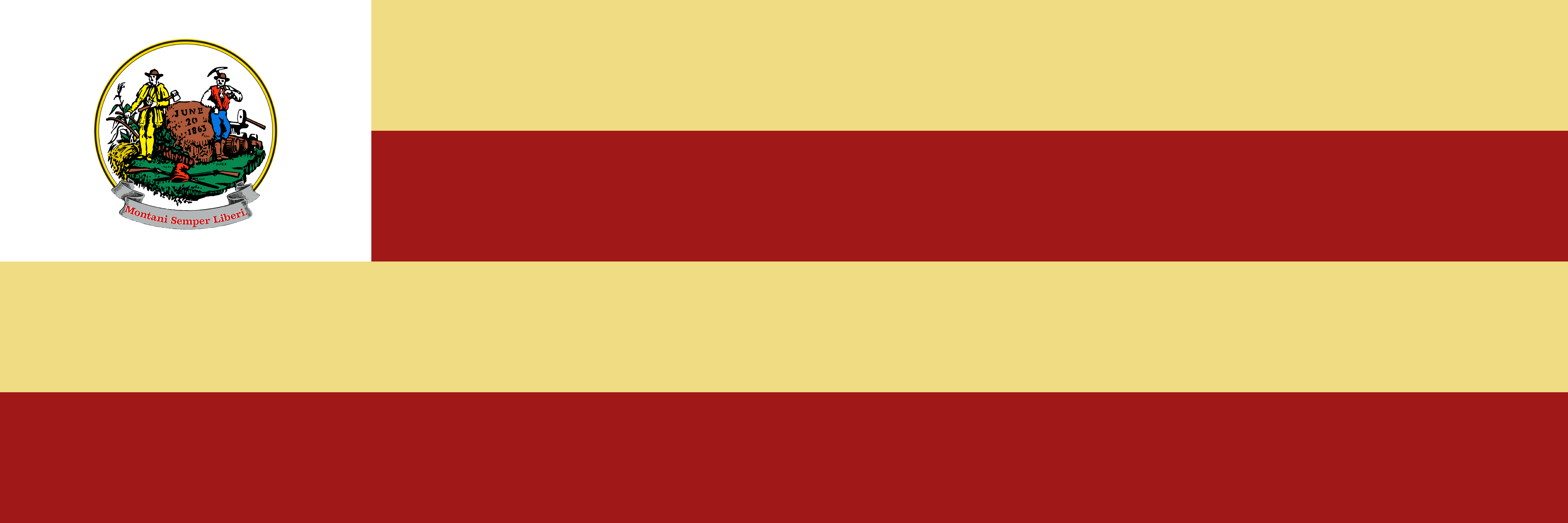
Digital reconstruction of the state flag from 1875

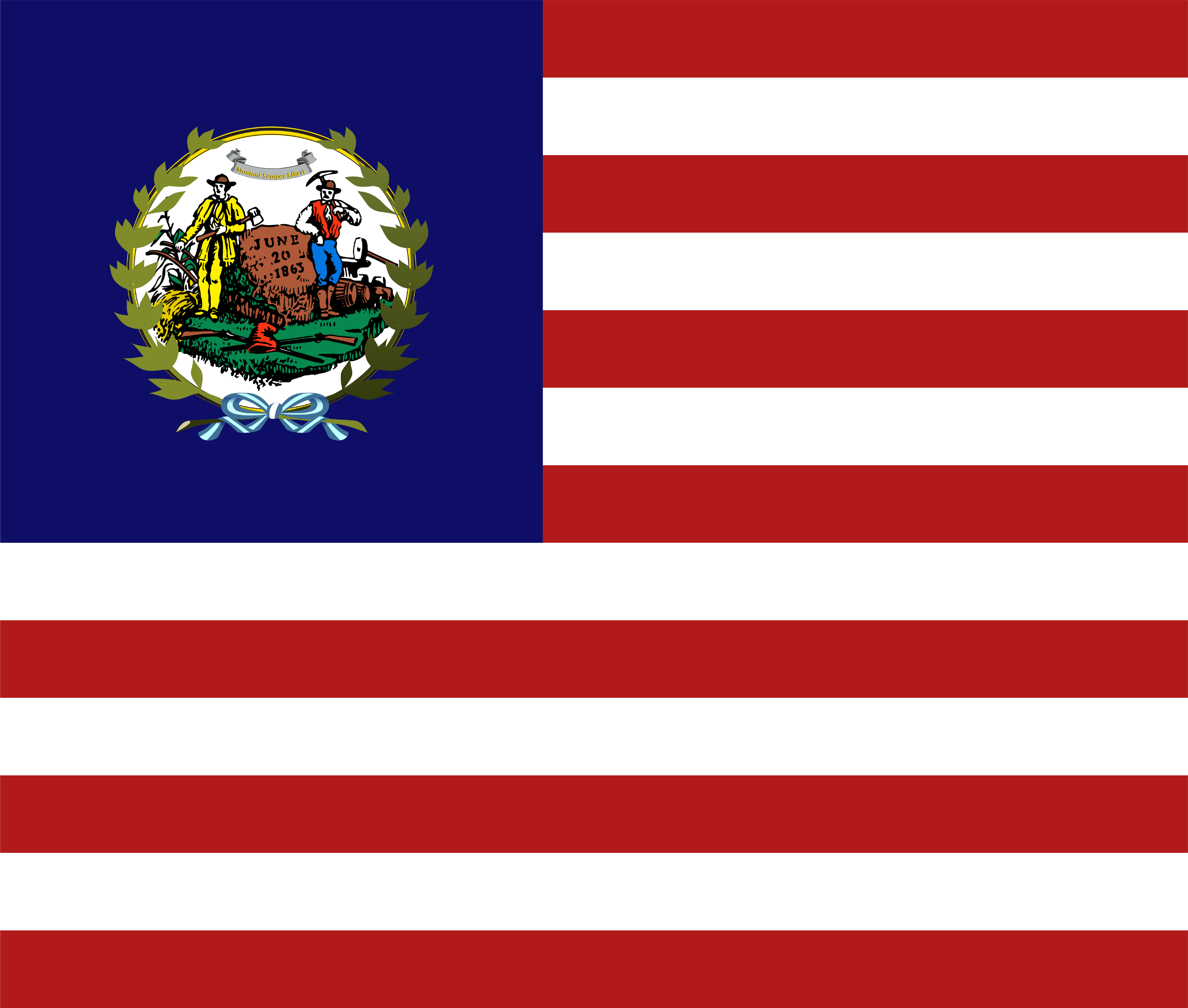
Digital reconstruction of state flag ordered by Boggs, 1900

During the Spanish-American War, the 2nd West Virginia infantry was given a state flag. It bore the state's coat of arms with the name of the regiment, the flag was purchased with funds raised by a group of women from Charleston.

In 1900, a state flag was sent to the Waldorf Hotel in New York City to be displayed at a fundraiser for orphan's of Charleston. It was later sold at auction, it contain the coat of arms of the state on its field. This got the idea that a state flag should be adopted although it would take 5 years for the idea of a state flag to become popular with the public. It also inspired the private secretary of the Governor, a man named Boggs to go to Cincinnati and ordered a state flag. It was described as a National flag with the state's coat of arms in the canton.

== Bibliography ==
- Harris, John T. (1922). West Virginia Legislative Hand Book and Manual and Official Register, 1922. Charleston, West Virginia: Tribune Printing Company. OCLC 9771361. Archived from the original on April 30, 2016 – via Google Books.
- Hogg, Charles E. (1914). Hogg's West Virginia Code Annotated, 1913. St. Paul, Minnesota: West Publishing Company. OCLC 769260495. Archived from the original on April 7, 2016 – via Google Books.
- National Reporter System (1906). The Code of West Virginia, 1906. St. Paul, Minnesota: West Publishing Company. OCLC 680537173. Archived from the original on April 11, 2016 – via Google Books.
- West Virginia Department of Education (1906). The West Virginia School Journal, Volume 35. Morgantown, West Virginia: West Virginia Department of Education. OCLC 19600650. Archived from the original on April 15, 2016 – via Google Books.
- West Virginia Legislature (2012). Holmes, Darrell E. (ed.). "West Virginia Blue Book, 2012" (PDF). West Virginia Blue Book. Charleston, West Virginia: Chapman Printing. ISSN 0364-7323. OCLC 1251675. Archived from the original (PDF) on October 5, 2015.
- "West Virginia Code". West Virginia Legislature website. West Virginia Legislature. Archived from the original on October 7, 2015.
- Znamierowski, Alfred (2002). The World Encyclopedia of Flags: The Definitive Guide to International Flags, Banners, Standards and Ensigns. London: Hermes Publishing. ISBN 978-1-84309-042-7. OCLC 495868096.
