= University of New England =

University of New England may refer to:

- University of New England (Australia), in New South Wales, with about 26,000 students
- University of New England (United States), in Biddeford, Maine, with about 6,000 students

== See also ==
- New England College in New Hampshire, United States
- New England (disambiguation)
