= New England (disambiguation) =

New England is a region of the Northeastern United States, comprising the states of Connecticut, Maine, Massachusetts, Rhode Island, New Hampshire and Vermont.

New England may also refer to:

== Places ==
=== United Kingdom ===
- New England, Peterborough, an area of Peterborough, Cambridgeshire, England
- New England, Lincolnshire, a settlement within the parish of Croft, Lincolnshire, England
- New England Island, an uninhabited island in Essex, England
- New England Quarter, a mixed-use development in Brighton and Hove, England

=== United States ===
- New England Colonies of British America (1620–1776), which became five of the six states in New England
- New England, Georgia, an unincorporated community in Dade County
- New England, North Dakota, a city in Hettinger County
- New England, Ohio, an unincorporated community in Athens County
- New England, West Virginia, an unincorporated community in Wood County

=== Elsewhere ===
- New England (New South Wales), a loosely defined region of Australia
- New England (medieval), on the north coast of the Black Sea, said to have been colonised by 11th century English refugees
- Nieuw Engeland, a district in Rotterdam, Netherlands

== Education ==
- New England College, based in Henniker, New Hampshire, U.S.
- University of New England (Australia), based in Armidale, New South Wales, Australia
- University of New England (United States), based in Biddeford, Maine, U.S.

== Government ==
- Division of New England, an electoral district in Australia, 1901–present
- Dominion of New England in America (1686–1689), an administrative union of English colonies in America
- Electoral district of New England, a defunct electoral district in Australia, 1859–1894
- Electoral district of New England and Macleay, a defunct electoral district in Australia, 1856–1859
- New England Confederation in America (1643–1686), a confederal alliance of English colonies in America
- New England town, the basic unit of local government in the New England states of the United States

== Literature ==
- New England, an imagined region in Nine Nations of North America by Joel Garreau
- Republic of New England, a fictional location in The Alteration by Kingsley Amis

== Music ==
- New England (band), an American rock band formed in 1978
  - New England (New England album), 1979
- New England (Wishbone Ash album), 1976
- "A New England", a 1983 song by Billy Bragg, covered by Kirsty MacColl and others

== Other uses ==
- USS New England, several ships of the U.S. Navy
- SS New England, several non-naval ships

== See also ==
- New Englander (disambiguation)
- England (disambiguation)
- Old England (disambiguation)
