= Cedar Grove, Wood County, West Virginia =

Unincorporated community in West Virginia, United States

Cedar Grove
- Unincorporated community
- Location within the state of West Virginia Cedar Grove (the United States)
- Coordinates: 39°13′40″N 81°30′23″W
- Country: United States
- State: West Virginia
- County: Wood
- Elevation: 751 ft (229 m)
- Time zone: UTC-5 (Eastern (EST))
  - Summer (DST): UTC-4 (EDT)
- GNIS ID: 1554091

Cedar Grove is an unincorporated community in Wood County, West Virginia, United States.

The community took its name from a nearby plantation of the same name, which was noted for its grove of cedar trees.
