= Rockport, Wood County, West Virginia =

Rockport, West Virginia
- Unincorporated community
- Location within the state of West Virginia Rockport, West Virginia (the United States)
- Coordinates: 39°4′27″N 81°33′11″W
- Country: United States
- State: West Virginia
- County: Wood
- Elevation: 705 ft (215 m)
- Time zone: UTC-5 (Eastern (EST))
  - Summer (DST): UTC-4 (EDT)
- ZIP codes: 26169
- FIPS code: 54107
- GNIS feature ID: 1555508

Rockport is an unincorporated community in Wood County, West Virginia, United States. It lies at an elevation of 705 feet (215 m), along Tygart Creek. It is the last exit in southern Wood County along I-77 and is unincorporated, with the ZIP code of 26169.
