= Mineralwells, West Virginia =

Mineral Wells, West Virginia
- CDP
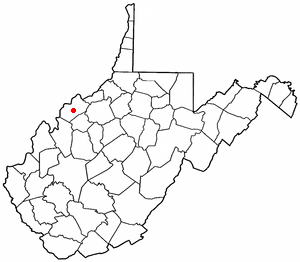
- Location of Mineralwells, West Virginia
- Coordinates: 39°10′57″N 81°30′27″W
- Country: United States
- State: West Virginia
- County: Wood

Government
  - Type: Mayor

Area
  - Total: 1.5 sq mi (4.0 km^{2})
  - Land: 1.5 sq mi (4.0 km^{2})
  - Water: 0 sq mi (0.0 km^{2})
- Elevation: 637 ft (194 m)

Population (2020)
  - Total: 1,805
  - Density: 1,200/sq mi (450/km^{2})
- Time zone: UTC-5 (Eastern (EST))
  - Summer (DST): UTC-4 (EDT)
- ZIP Codes: 26120, 26121, 26150
- Area code: 304
- FIPS code: 54-54580
- GNIS feature ID: 2389489

Mineralwells, also known as Mineral Wells, is a census-designated place (CDP) in Wood County, West Virginia, United States. It is part of the Parkersburg-Marietta-Vienna, WV-OH Metropolitan Statistical Area. The population was 1,950 at the 2010 census, in which, by 2020, the population decreased to 1,805.

The United States Census Bureau calls the community Mineralwells, although the United States Postal Service renamed the community's post office in the late 1990s to Mineral Wells.

== Geography ==
Mineralwells is located south of the Little Kanawha River, along Tygart Creek.

According to the United States Census Bureau, the CDP has a total area of 1.5 square miles (4.0 km^{2}), all land.

== Demographics ==
Historical population
Census	Pop.	Note	%±
2000	1,860		—
2010	1,950		4.8%
2020	1,805		−7.4%
U.S. Decennial Census

At the 2000 census there were 1,860 people, 674 households, and 552 families living in the CDP. The population density was 1,171.8 people per square mile (451.7/km^{2}). There were 708 housing units at an average density of 446.0/sq mi (171.9/km^{2}). The racial makeup of the CDP was 98.71% White, 0.16% African American, 0.27% Native American, 0.22% Asian, 0.05% Pacific Islander, and 0.59% from two or more races. Hispanic or Latino of any race were 0.22%.

Of the 674 households 42.0% had children under the age of 18 living with them, 68.8% were married couples living together, 10.7% had a female householder with no husband present, and 18.0% were non-families. 15.0% of households were one person and 4.2% were one person aged 65 or older. The average household size was 2.76 and the average family size was 3.03.

The age distribution was 29.0% under the age of 18, 7.7% from 18 to 24, 30.0% from 25 to 44, 26.3% from 45 to 64, and 7.0% 65 or older. The median age was 35 years. For every 100 females there were 94.0 males. For every 100 females age 18 and over, there were 94.3 males.

The median household income was $42,083 and the median family income was $44,188. Males had a median income of $39,609 versus $22,026 for females. The per capita income for the CDP was $19,100. About 4.2% of families and 9.0% of the population were below the poverty line, including 13.9% of those under age 18 and none of those age 65 or over.
