= Wood County, West Virginia =

County in West Virginia, United States

- County
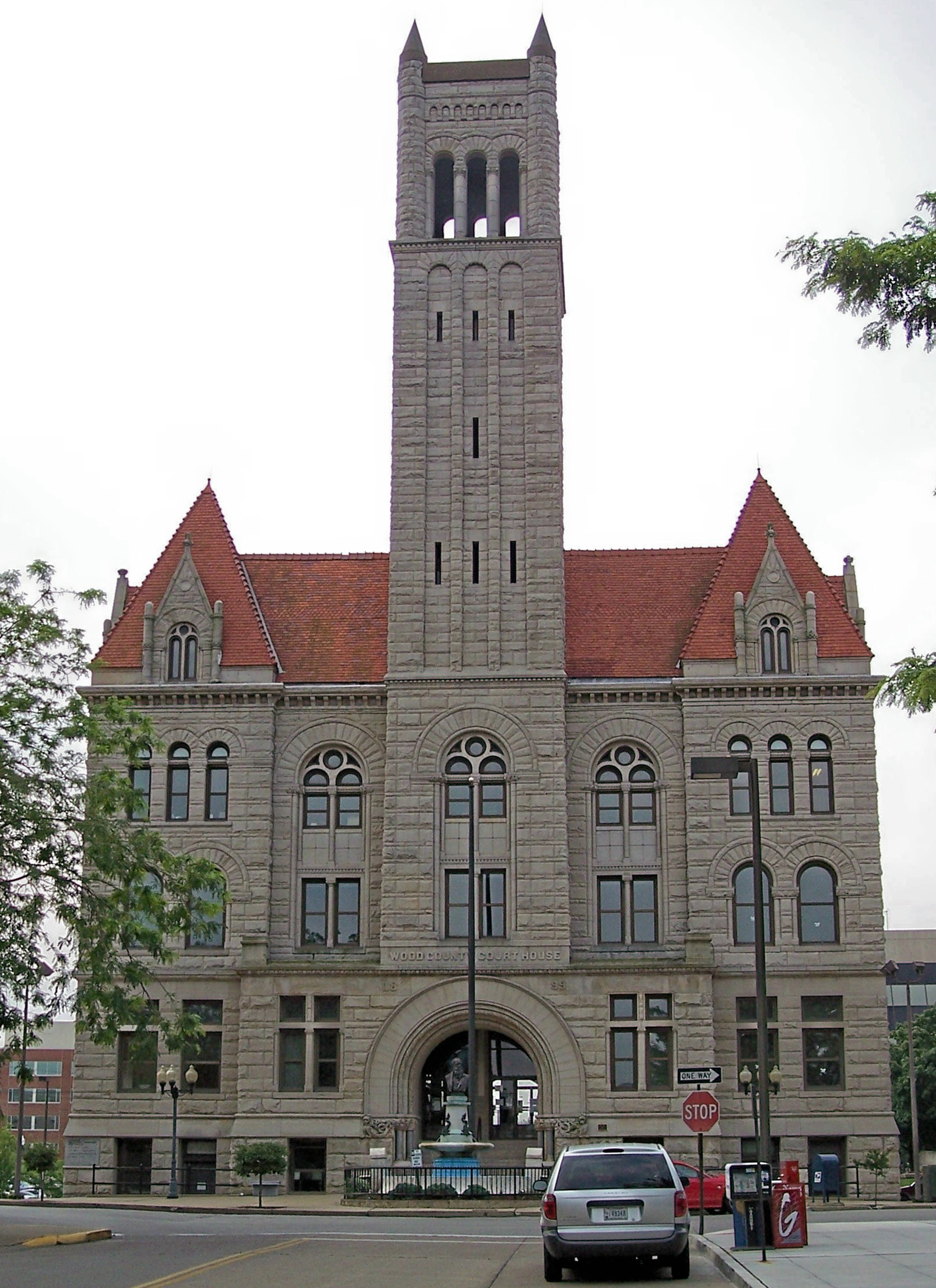
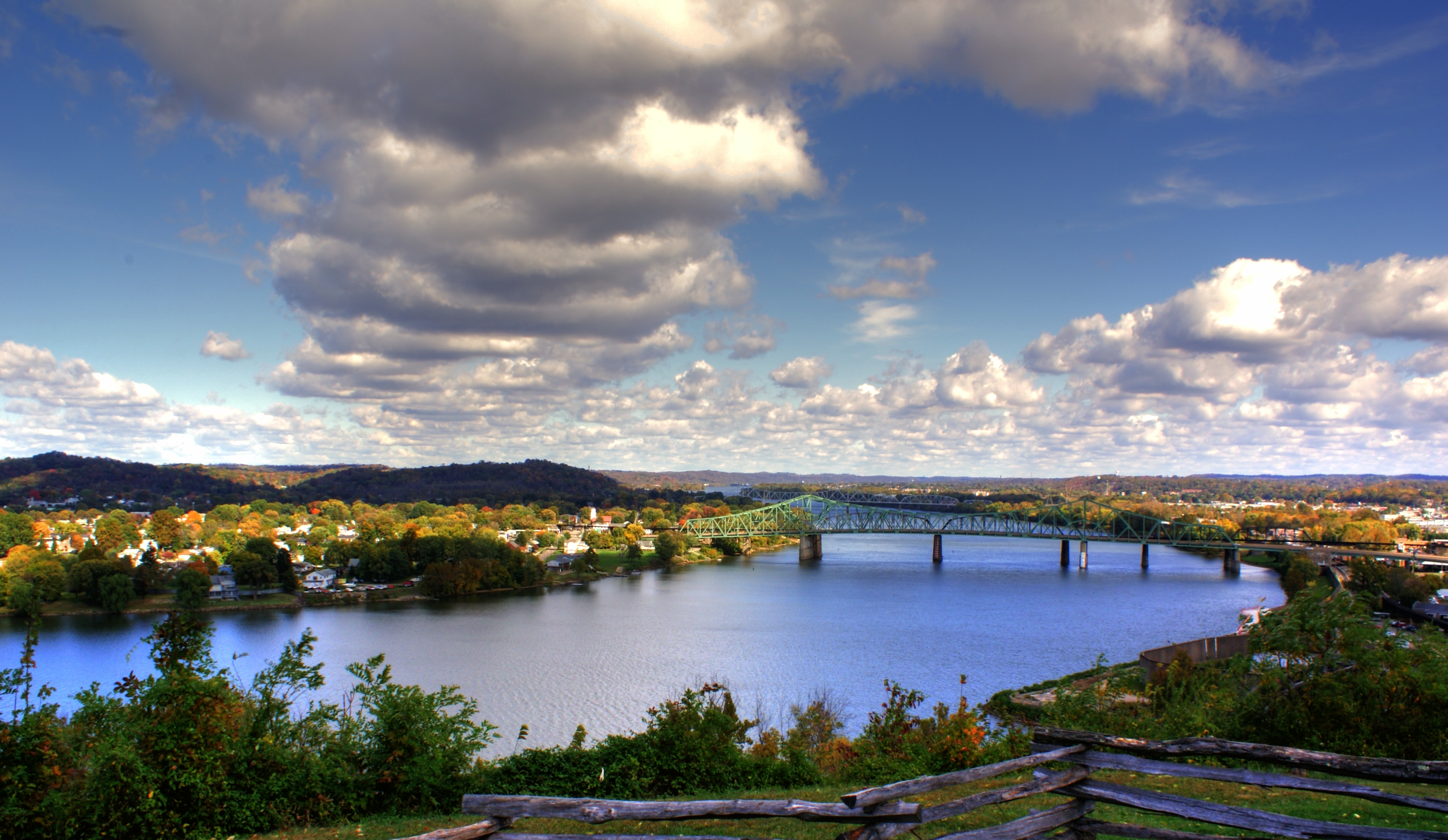
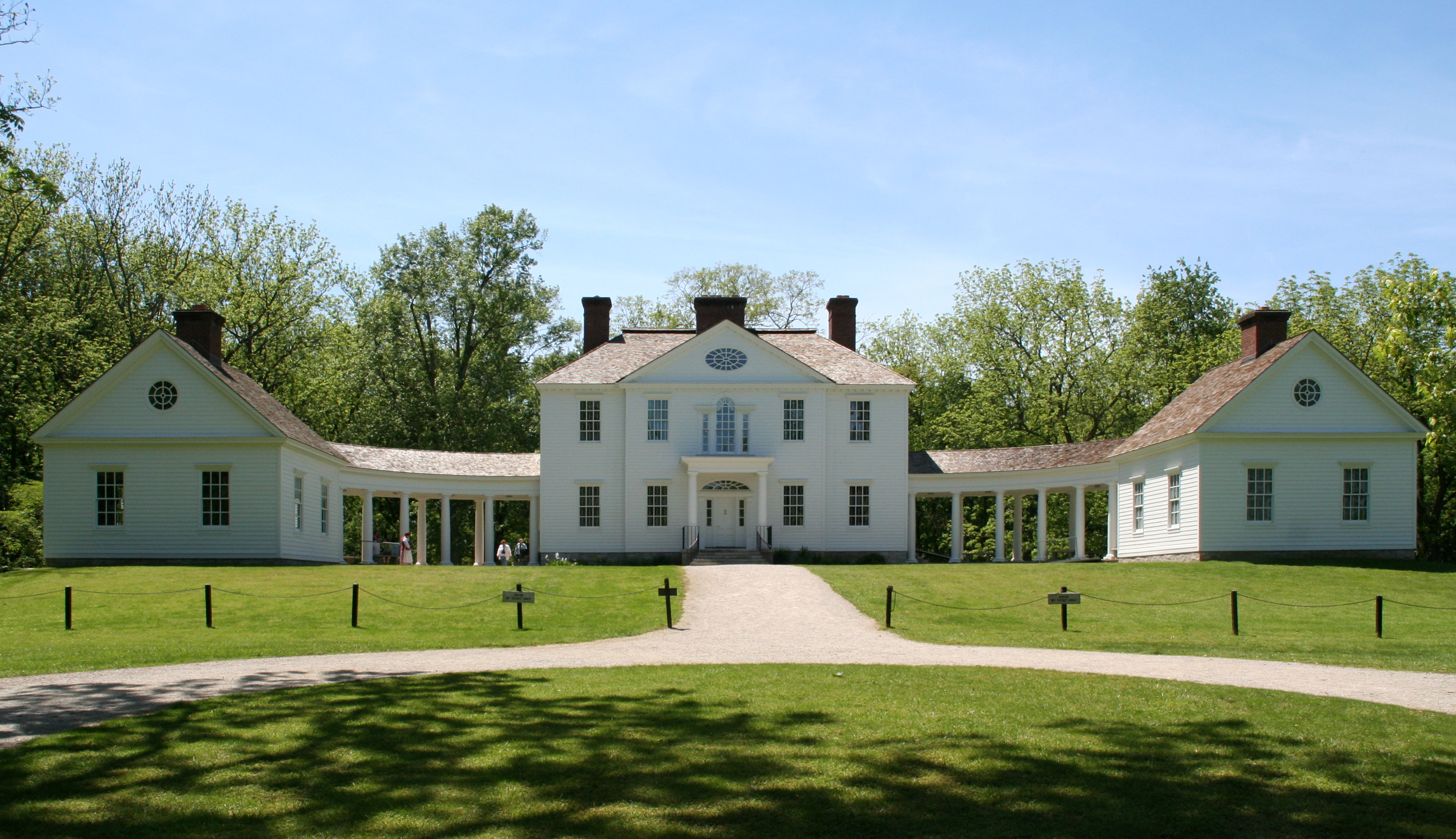
- Wood County Courthouse View of the Ohio River from Fort Boreman Overlook Blennerhassett Mansion

- Location within the U.S. state of West Virginia
- Coordinates: 39°13′N 81°31′W
- Country: United States
- State: West Virginia
- Founded: December 21, 1798
- Named for: James Wood
- Seat: Parkersburg
- Largest city: Parkersburg

Area
  - Total: 377 sq mi (980 km^{2})
  - Land: 367 sq mi (950 km^{2})
  - Water: 11 sq mi (28 km^{2}) 2.8%

Population (2020)
  - Total: 84,296
  - Estimate (2025): 82,385 ▼
  - Density: 230/sq mi (88.7/km^{2})
- Time zone: UTC−5 (Eastern)
  - Summer (DST): UTC−4 (EDT)
- Congressional district: 1st
- Website: www.woodcountywv.com

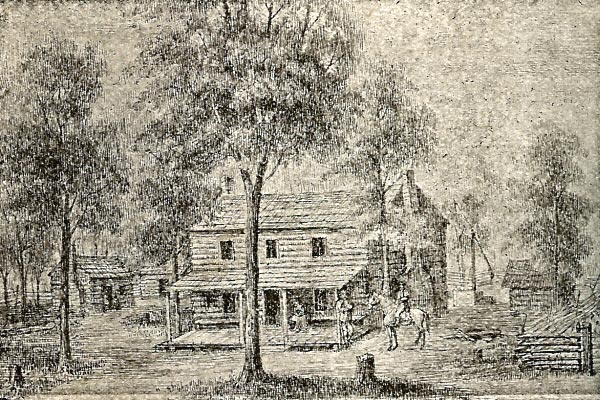
First courthouse in Wood County (ca. 1802), sketch by Joseph H. Diss Debar

Wood County is a county in the U.S. state of West Virginia. As of the 2020 census, the population was 84,296, making it West Virginia's fifth-most populous county. Its county seat is Parkersburg. The county was formed in 1798 from the western part of Harrison County and named for James Wood, governor of Virginia from 1796 to 1799.

Wood County is part of the Parkersburg-Vienna, WV Metropolitan Statistical Area.

== History ==
=== 1700s ===
==== Early European settlement ====
Settlement in the Ohio Valley was restricted in the years following the French and Indian War. However, the signing of the Treaty of Fort Stanwix and the Treaty of Hard Labor in 1768 cleared the way for the settlement of areas east of the Ohio River, including modern-day Wood County. In the years following the treaties, dozens of settlements were established along the Ohio, Little Kanawha, and Hughes Rivers. By 1775, many immigrants had made settlement and preemption claims in the area that would later constitute Wood County. Most of the earliest settlers were Scotch-Irish who came from southwestern Pennsylvania. One of the earlier settlements in Wood County was established in 1785, when Joseph Wood of New Jersey and four Scottish families settled the area around Belleville.

After surviving a conflict with the local Native American tribes from 1791 to 1795, the area that would become Wood County entered an era of steady but slow expansion and development. Many early settlers had come from the Tidewater Region of Virginia, bringing with them Southern culture and the practice of slavery, using enslaved people to establish plantations. Barbecues and horse racing were common activities among the early inhabitants. Welsh immigrants also came to the area.

Wood County was formed on December 21, 1798, from portions of Harrison County. It was named for the then Governor of Virginia (1796–99), James Wood, formerly a brigadier general in the American Revolutionary War.

==== Blennerhassett Island and the Burr Conspiracy ====
Harman Blennerhassett, an Anglo-Irish aristocrat, purchased Blennerhassett Island in 1798, where he built Blennerhassett Mansion. Harman Blennerhassett was known for hosting lavish parties that attracted many high-profile guests. One of the most famous visitors was Aaron Burr. Aaron Burr's relationship with Harman Blennerhassett eventually led to the island being the headquarters for the Burr Conspiracy, with Harman providing financial support and men to Burr.

When word of the Burr Conspiracy leaked out, both Harman Blennerhassett and Aaron Burr fled the island before the Ohio Militia raided it in 1806. Both were later arrested, however the Supreme Court ruled that Burr's plot did not fit the definition of treason. Harman Blennerhassett never regained his wealth after the incident. A fire then burned Blennerhassett Mansion to the ground in 1811, even further complicating the financial issues of the Blennerhassetts.

Harman Blennerhassett tried to regain his fortunes by establishing a cotton plantation in Mississippi, but crop failures doomed the venture. Harman eventually returned to Ireland where he lived off the charity of his relatives. He died in poverty in 1831.

=== 1800s ===
==== Creation of an aristocratic society ====
After Wood County was formed, many of its most prominent families and individuals organized and created an aristocratic class that came to dominate nearly every economic, political, and social aspect of life in Wood County. People in this group were mostly slaveholding eastern Virginia Tuckahoes who were led by families like the Hendersons. Some were New Englanders who had connections to military officers in Marietta, Ohio. The Cohees of western Pennsylvania and western Virginia were heavily excluded from this group.

Harman Blennerhassett's manuscript that he wrote while awaiting trial in Richmond in 1807 showcases the tensions in Wood County spawning from the two groups-

"Col. Phelps complained much of the ill-treatment he had received from the said Hendersons, who, he said, had risen in the county on his shoulders, without specifying particulars: observing, however, that the Tuckahoes would soon over-run the county."

==== Economic growth ====
The economy of Wood County was boosted by the completion of two turnpikes by 1847 and the arrival of the Northwestern Virginia Railroad in Parkersburg a decade later. The discovery of oil in the area led to additional economic growth. As a result, Wood County attracted a diverse population, including the largest Irish Catholic, German, and Jewish settlements between Wheeling and Huntington.

==== Civil War ====
In 1861, Virginia seceded from the Union. After Wood County received news of the secession via telegraph, a riot ensued at Courthouse Square. Fighting between Unionists and secessionists occurred, and the county militia attempted to seize the two cannons provided to them by the State of Virginia in 1860. The county militia then split into two factions, divided by their sympathies. During the Civil War, Wood County was deeply divided, with large numbers of men serving on both sides. In May 1861, upon being informed that Confederates were threatening the Baltimore and Ohio Railroad, General George B. McClellan sent troops into the Parkersburg area to protect the terminus.

In July 1862, after sixteen Moccasin Rangers were spotted resting at Tygart Creek, a rumor spread that there was a Confederate invasion force preparing to march onto Parkersburg. Three Parkersburg residents then reported a supposed army of 500 men marching towards Parkersburg. While the town panicked, an extraordinary court was formed to deal with the imaginary army marching onto the town. The Wood County Court appointed a committee of three, consisting of two Confederates and one Unionist, to head south and negotiate with the army. The three then encountered a Union picket line and were fired upon before being arrested and taken back to Parkersburg.

The delegates of the 40 western counties who opposed secession formed their own government and seceded from the Confederate state of Virginia. West Virginia was granted statehood in 1863. Later that year, West Virginia's counties were divided into civil townships, with the intention of encouraging local government. This proved impractical in the heavily rural state, and in 1872 the townships were converted into magisterial districts. Wood County was divided into ten districts: Clay, Harris, Lubeck, Parkersburg, Slate, Steele, Tygart, Union, Walker, and Williams.

==== Sumner School ====
In 1862, Sumner School was established as the first free African American school south of the Mason-Dixon Line. The cause for the school's creation supposedly came from Robert F. Simmons, a barber, traveling to Washington D.C. and petitioning Abraham Lincoln for his support to create the school. in 1866, under the control of the West Virginia state government, Sumner School officially entered the segregated school system. Sumner School also became the first African American high school in West Virginia. The school later closed in 1955, after Brown vs. Board of Education outlawed segregation in schools in 1954.

==== Reconstruction ====
Following the end of the Civil War, The West Virginia state government forced voters to swear oaths attesting to past Union loyalty. The oath was required to be taken by any citizen whose loyalty had been questioned. Failing to take the oath could lead to fines or imprisonment. In October 1865, A riot occurred in Parkersburg over this issue, as reported by the Parkersburg Daily Times-

"There was a good deal of excitement yesterday about the rolls at the Court House; but we saw no pistols in use. The complaint among the sympathizers was that they were required to take the test oath."

Federal soldiers would remain in Parkersburg until at least the end of 1865, though most would have been discharged by then.

=== 1900s ===
==== Flooding ====
Flooding in Wood County was a major issue for its inhabitants. Major floods occurred annually, with the most devastating flood for Wood County being the Flood of 1913. On March 29, 1913, the Ohio River crested at 58.9 feet, causing millions of dollars in damage and catching many by surprise. In addition to the flood, Parkersburg officials were fighting a fire that destroyed an entire city block. Four banks were forced to relocate from Parkersburg, and the city was left isolated for four days without telegraph, telephone, or rail service. Parkersburg received no federal aid. However, the National Guard was summoned.

=== 2010s ===
==== Klan rally held at Mountwood Park ====
Mountwood Park was the site of a Ku Klux Klan rally in 2014. Armed guards were present, local Grand Dragon John Himmler said it was to keep the "unwanted" out. Wood County Sherriff Ken Merritt said that there was no law prohibiting open carrying firearms at the park. Wood County Parks Director Jeremy Cross said he did know about the nature of the event until after it had happened. The gathering was announced through flyers months prior to the rally. Himmler said about 40 Klan members attended the rally, along with around 15 prospecting members. Himmler later said he would like to see the Ku Klux Klan be more active in the area, including community service, to show people “another side of the coin.”

== Geography ==
According to the United States Census Bureau, the county has a total area of 377 square miles (980 km^{2}), of which 366 square miles (950 km^{2}) is land and 11 square miles (28 km^{2}) (2.8%) is water.

Wood County's northern and western boundary is the Ohio River. The Little Kanawha River flows northwestward through the county to its mouth at the Ohio River in Parkersburg. Tributaries of the Little Kanawha River in Wood County include Worthington Creek, Tygart Creek, Beeson Run and Walker Creek.

=== Major highways ===
- Interstate 77
- U.S. Route 50
- West Virginia Route 2
- West Virginia Route 14
- West Virginia Route 31
- West Virginia Route 47
- West Virginia Route 68
- West Virginia Route 95

=== Adjacent counties ===
- Washington County, Ohio (north)
- Pleasants County (northeast)
- Ritchie County (east)
- Wirt County (southeast)
- Jackson County (south)
- Meigs County, Ohio (southwest)
- Athens County, Ohio (west)

=== National protected area ===
- Ohio River Islands National Wildlife Refuge (part)

== Demographics ==
Historical population
Census	Pop.	Note	%±
1800	1,217		—
1810	3,036		149.5%
1820	5,860		93.0%
1830	6,429		9.7%
1840	7,923		23.2%
1850	9,450		19.3%
1860	11,046		16.9%
1870	19,000		72.0%
1880	25,006		31.6%
1890	28,612		14.4%
1900	34,452		20.4%
1910	38,001		10.3%
1920	42,306		11.3%
1930	56,521		33.6%
1940	62,399		10.4%
1950	66,540		6.6%
1960	78,331		17.7%
1970	86,818		10.8%
1980	93,648		7.9%
1990	86,915		−7.2%
2000	87,986		1.2%
2010	86,956		−1.2%
2020	84,296		−3.1%
2025 (est.)	82,385	▼	−2.3%
U.S. Decennial Census; 1790–1960 1900–1990; 1990–2000 2010–2020

=== 2020 census ===
As of the 2020 census, the county had a population of 84,296. Of the residents, 20.6% were under the age of 18 and 20.9% were 65 years of age or older; the median age was 43.8 years. For every 100 females there were 95.3 males, and for every 100 females age 18 and over there were 93.3 males.

The racial makeup of the county was 92.7% White, 1.2% Black or African American, 0.2% American Indian and Alaska Native, 0.7% Asian, 0.5% from some other race, and 4.7% from two or more races. Hispanic or Latino residents of any race comprised 1.4% of the population.

There were 36,192 households in the county; 26.1% had children under the age of 18 living with them, 45.3% were married couples living together, 28.1% had a female householder with no spouse or partner present, and 23.1% had a male householder with no spouse present. About 31.6% of all households were made up of individuals and 14.1% had someone living alone who was 65 years of age or older. The average household and family size was 2.86.

There were 40,304 housing units, of which 10.2% were vacant. Among occupied housing units, 71.0% were owner-occupied and 29.0% were renter-occupied. The homeowner vacancy rate was 1.8% and the rental vacancy rate was 10.0%.

The median income for a household was $54,750 and the poverty rate was 12.9%.

Wood County, West Virginia – Racial and ethnic composition Note: the US Census treats Hispanic/Latino as an ethnic category. This table excludes Latinos from the racial categories and assigns them to a separate category. Hispanics/Latinos may be of any race.
Race / Ethnicity (NH = Non-Hispanic)	Pop 2000	Pop 2010	Pop 2020	% 2000	% 2010	% 2020
White alone (NH)	85,247	83,352	77,718	96.89%	95.86%	92.20%
Black or African American alone (NH)	858	940	1,016	0.98%	1.08%	1.21%
Native American or Alaska Native alone (NH)	182	184	148	0.21%	0.21%	0.18%
Asian alone (NH)	448	468	564	0.51%	0.54%	0.67%
Pacific Islander alone (NH)	26	28	17	0.03%	0.03%	0.02%
Other race alone (NH)	58	70	209	0.07%	0.08%	0.25%
Mixed race or Multiracial (NH)	653	1,170	3,450	0.74%	1.35%	4.09%
Hispanic or Latino (any race)	514	744	1,174	0.58%	0.86%	1.39%
Total	87,986	86,956	84,296	100.00%	100.00%	100.00%

=== 2010 census ===
As of the 2010 United States census, there were 86,956 people, 36,571 households, and 24,262 families living in the county. The population density was 237.4 inhabitants per square mile (91.7/km^{2}). There were 40,215 housing units at an average density of 109.8 units per square mile (42.4 units/km^{2}). The racial makeup of the county was 96.4% white, 1.1% black or African American, 0.5% Asian, 0.2% American Indian, 0.2% from other races, and 1.5% from two or more races. Those of Hispanic or Latino origin made up 0.9% of the population. In terms of ancestry, 22.3% were German, 19.6% were American, 13.7% were English, and 13.6% were Irish.

Of the 36,571 households, 29.1% had children under the age of 18 living with them, 50.1% were married couples living together, 11.6% had a female householder with no husband present, 33.7% were non-families, and 28.4% of all households were made up of individuals. The average household size was 2.35 and the average family size was 2.85. The median age was 42.2 years.

The median income for a household in the county was $42,146 and the median income for a family was $52,058. Males had a median income of $42,497 versus $27,893 for females. The per capita income for the county was $22,890. About 12.3% of families and 16.4% of the population were below the poverty line, including 25.3% of those under age 18 and 7.8% of those age 65 or over.

=== 2000 census ===
As of the census of 2000, there were 87,986 people, 36,275 households, and 24,884 families living in the county. The population density was 240 inhabitants per square mile (93/km^{2}). There were 39,785 housing units at an average density of 108 units per square mile (42 units/km^{2}). The racial makeup of the county was 97.32% White, 1.01% Black or African American, 0.21% Native American, 0.51% Asian, 0.04% Pacific Islander, 0.14% from other races, and 0.77% from two or more races. 0.58% of the population were Hispanic or Latino of any race.

There were 36,275 households, out of which 29.30% had children under the age of 18 living with them, 54.30% were married couples living together, 10.80% had a female householder with no husband present, and 31.40% were non-families. 27.10% of all households were made up of individuals, and 11.50% had someone living alone who was 65 years of age or older. The average household size was 2.39 and the average family size was 2.88.

In the county, the population was spread out, with 23.00% under the age of 18, 8.00% from 18 to 24, 27.90% from 25 to 44, 25.60% from 45 to 64, and 15.50% who were 65 years of age or older. The median age was 39 years. For every 100 females there were 92.40 males. For every 100 females age 18 and over, there were 89.30 males.

The median income for a household in the county was $33,285, and the median income for a family was $40,436. Males had a median income of $34,899 versus $22,109 for females. The per capita income for the county was $18,073. About 10.60% of families and 13.90% of the population were below the poverty line, including 20.50% of those under age 18 and 8.60% of those age 65 or over.

== Politics ==
West Virginia gubernatorial election results for Wood County, West Virginia
Year	Republican	Democratic	Third Parties
2024	64.72% 23,422	29.10% 10,532	6.18% 2,237
2020	68.32% 26,232	25.87% 9,933	3.03% 1,162
2016	44.67%% 15,959	48.26% 17,240	7.08% 2,527
2012	48.51% 16,272	48.55% 16,284	2.94% 986
2011	53.58% 7,888	43.45% 6,396	2.96% 437
2008	21.56% 7,658	75.35% 26,769	3.09% 1,098
2004	34.40% 13,383	64.01% 24,904	1.60% 622

Wood County is an outlier in West Virginia. After being strongly Unionist during the Virginia Secession Convention it mostly identified with the Republican Party after the Civil War. However, Between 1912 and 1964, Wood County was largely competitive, voting for both the Democratic and Republican presidential candidates 7 times each. Herbert Hoover was the best performing Republican candidate in that timespan, with Lyndon Baines Johnson being the best performing Democrat in the county's history.

Out of Democrats who won the county, Samuel Tilden and Harry S. Truman were the only ones who did not go on to win over 400 electoral votes. Wood County hasn't voted for a Democratic candidate in any presidential election since 1964. Richard Nixon has been the best performing Republican candidate in the county since 1912, winning 71.5% of the vote in 1972. Though Donald Trump achieved a wider margin of victory in 2016.

Between 1992 and 2024, the county shifted towards the Republican Party eight times out of the nine elections held in that time period. Democratic candidates in local and state elections historically performed better, with a plurality of voters in Wood County remaining registered as Democrats until after Barack Obama's election in 2008. As of 2026, Joe Manchin was the last Democrat to win Wood County in any election, having won it in his 2018 Senate election.

United States presidential election results for Wood County, West Virginia
Year	Republican		Democratic		Third party(ies)	
Year	No.	%	No.	%	No.	%
1912	2,509	29.37%	3,784	44.29%	2,251	26.35%
1916	4,521	47.69%	4,817	50.81%	142	1.50%
1920	10,463	53.72%	8,839	45.38%	176	0.90%
1924	10,086	50.29%	9,378	46.76%	591	2.95%
1928	15,184	69.90%	6,412	29.52%	125	0.58%
1932	12,144	47.30%	13,294	51.78%	235	0.92%
1936	12,574	42.75%	16,829	57.21%	11	0.04%
1940	15,005	48.45%	15,962	51.55%	0	0.00%
1944	14,566	51.58%	13,676	48.42%	0	0.00%
1948	14,198	49.83%	14,224	49.92%	71	0.25%
1952	19,917	58.46%	14,154	41.54%	0	0.00%
1956	21,096	61.30%	13,320	38.70%	0	0.00%
1960	22,131	58.97%	15,396	41.03%	0	0.00%
1964	14,947	40.94%	21,560	59.06%	0	0.00%
1968	18,960	51.76%	14,293	39.02%	3,379	9.22%
1972	27,315	71.50%	10,886	28.50%	0	0.00%
1976	18,382	51.84%	17,075	48.16%	0	0.00%
1980	20,080	56.54%	13,622	38.36%	1,810	5.10%
1984	24,821	68.42%	11,357	31.30%	101	0.28%
1988	19,450	59.73%	12,959	39.80%	154	0.47%
1992	15,441	42.83%	13,529	37.52%	7,084	19.65%
1996	15,502	47.45%	13,261	40.59%	3,909	11.96%
2000	20,428	60.34%	12,664	37.40%	765	2.26%
2004	24,948	63.60%	14,025	35.75%	254	0.65%
2008	22,896	63.38%	12,573	34.80%	657	1.82%
2012	22,183	65.10%	11,230	32.96%	663	1.95%
2016	25,434	70.51%	8,400	23.29%	2,237	6.20%
2020	27,202	70.17%	10,926	28.19%	637	1.64%
2024	26,380	70.70%	10,317	27.65%	616	1.65%

== Communities ==
=== Cities ===
- Parkersburg (county seat)
- Vienna
- Williamstown

=== Town ===
- North Hills

=== Magisterial districts ===
- Clay
- Harris
- Lubeck
- Parkersburg
- Slate
- Steele
- Tygart
- Union
- Walker
- Williams

=== Census-designated places ===
- Blennerhassett
- Boaz
- Kanawha
- Lubeck
- Mineralwells
- Washington
- Waverly

=== Unincorporated communities ===
- Belleville
- Bonnivale
- Cedar Grove
- Central
- Eli
- Dallison
- Davisville
- Deerwalk
- Fort Neal
- Mount Carmel
- New England
- Ogden
- Pettyville
- Rockport
- Slate
- Volcano
- Walker
- Wells Subdivision

== See also ==
- Wood County Schools
- Blennerhassett Island Historical State Park
- Fries Park
- National Register of Historic Places listings in Wood County, West Virginia
