= Walker Creek (West Virginia) =

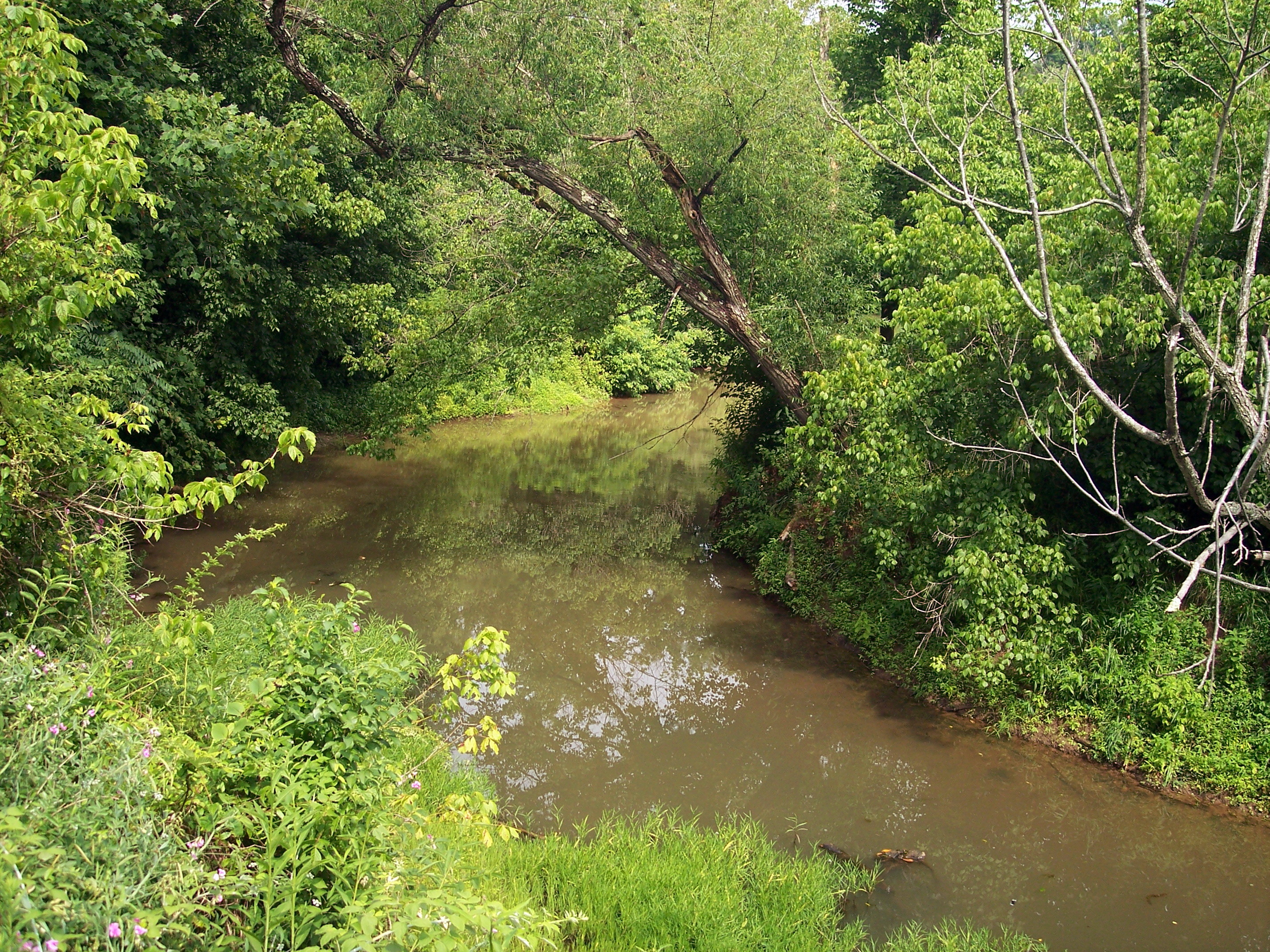
- Walker Creek as viewed from the North Bend Rail Trail in Walker

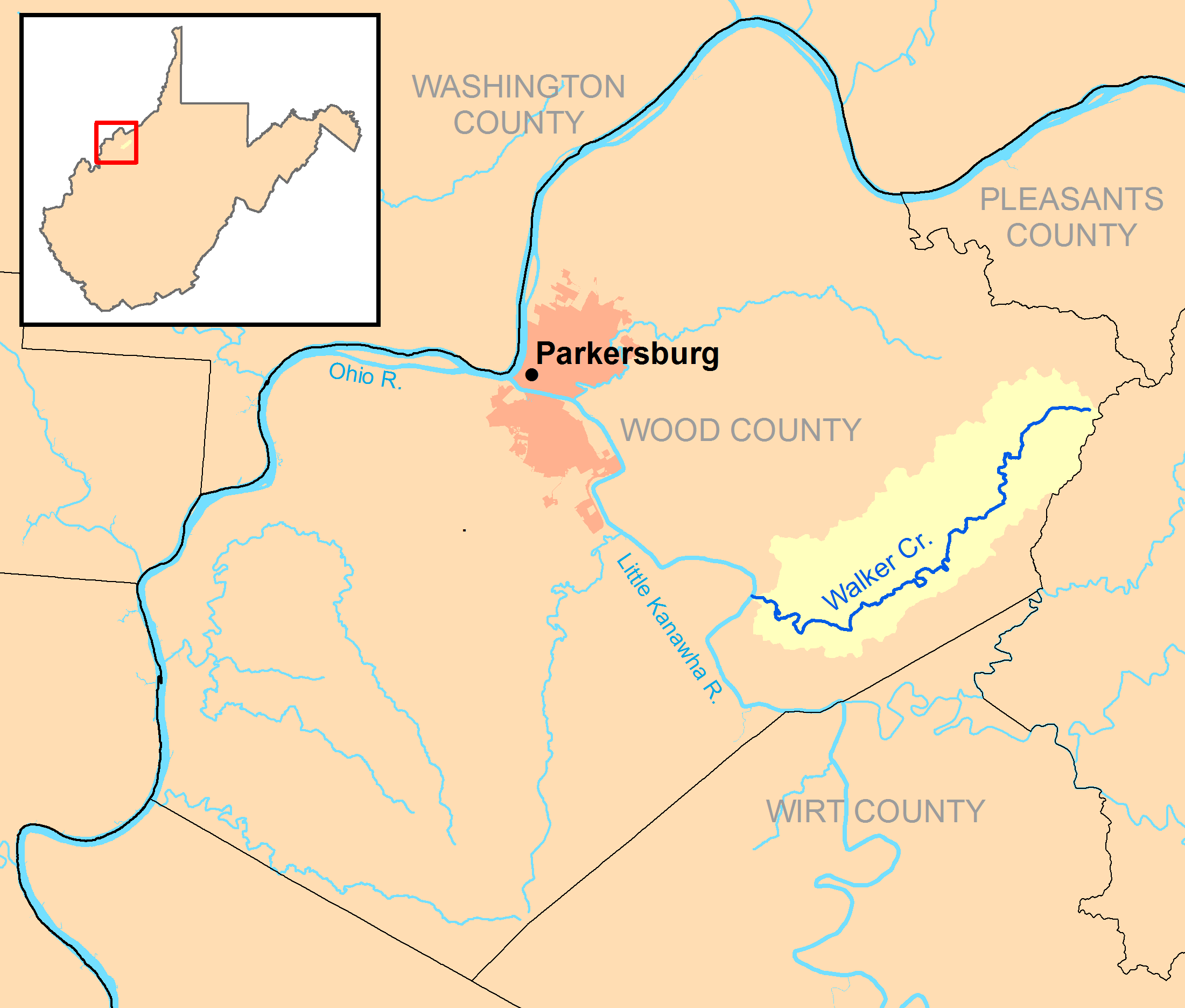
- Walker Creek and its watershed in Wood County, West Virginia

Location
- Country: United States
- State: West Virginia
- Counties: Wood

Physical characteristics
- Source
  - location: east of Deerwalk
  - coordinates: 39.2559092°N 81.2698368°W
  - elevation: 1,070 ft (330 m)
- Mouth: Little Kanawha River
  - location: southeast of Kanawha
  - coordinates: 39.1809101°N 81.4426205°W
  - elevation: 594 ft (181 m)
- Length: 15.6 mi (25.1 km)
- Basin size: 32 sq mi (83 km^{2})

Walker Creek is a tributary of the Little Kanawha River, 15.6 miles (25.1 km) long, in western West Virginia in the United States. Via the Little Kanawha and Ohio rivers, it is part of the watershed of the Mississippi River, draining an area of 32 square miles (83 km^{2}) on the unglaciated portion of the Allegheny Plateau.

Walker Creek’s course and drainage area are entirely in eastern Wood County. It rises approximately 3 miles (4.8 km) east of the community of Deerwalk and flows generally southeastward, through the community of Walker, to join the Little Kanawha River approximately 1 mile (1.6 km) southeast of the community of Kanawha, 11.3 miles (18.2 km) upstream of the Little Kanawha River's mouth in Parkersburg.

According to the West Virginia Department of Environmental Protection, approximately 91% of the Walker Creek watershed is forested, mostly deciduous. Approximately 8% is used for pasture and agriculture. A portion of the creek’s course near its headwaters was impounded in 1979 for recreational purposes, forming the 41-acre (17 ha) Mountwood Park Lake. Portions of the creek’s lower course are paralleled by the North Bend Rail Trail, a former line of the Baltimore and Ohio Railroad.

According to the Geographic Names Information System, Walker Creek has also been known historically by the name "Walker’s Creek."

== See also ==
- List of rivers of West Virginia
