= Tygart Creek =

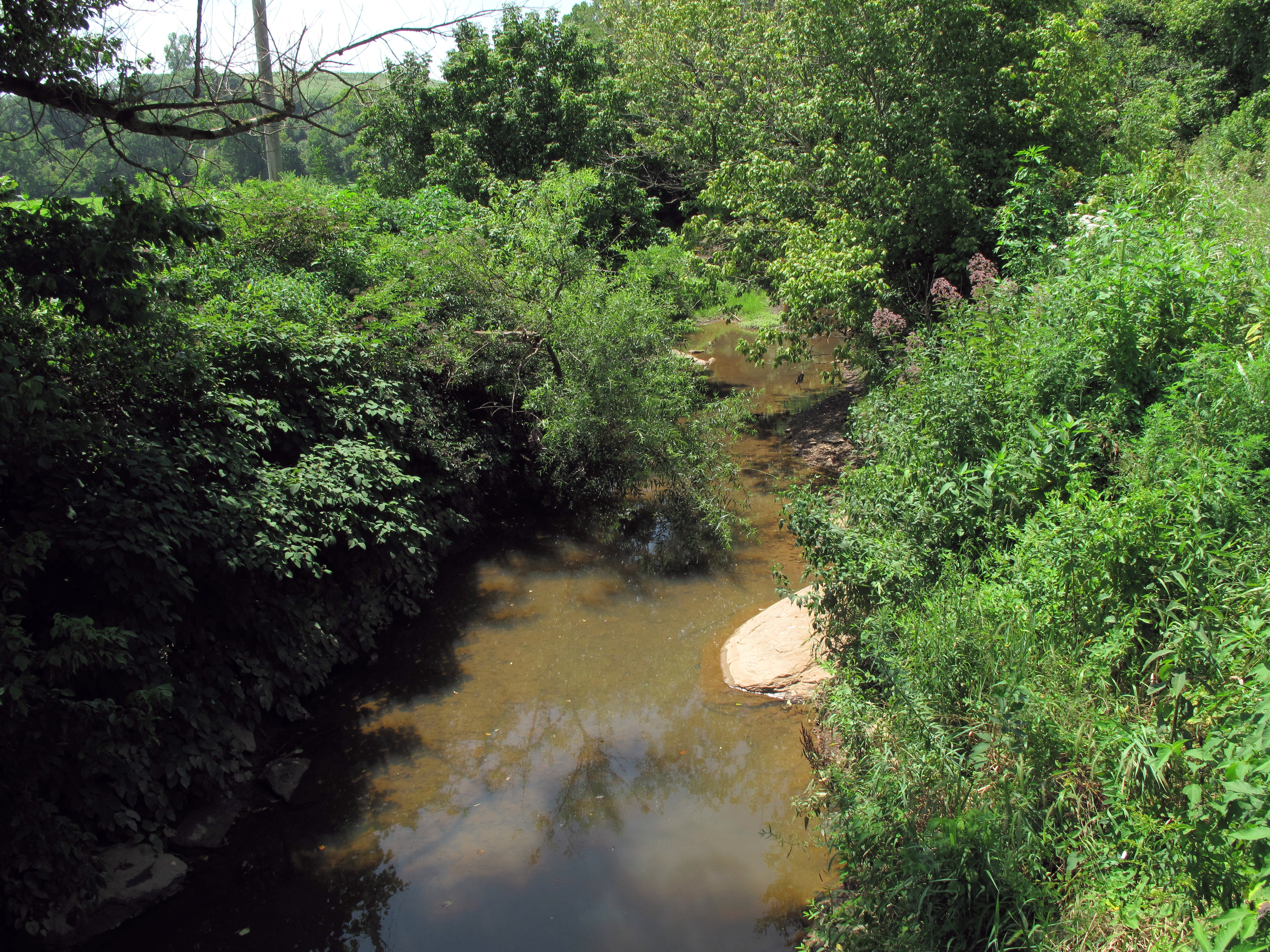
- Tygart Creek near Mineral Wells in 2010

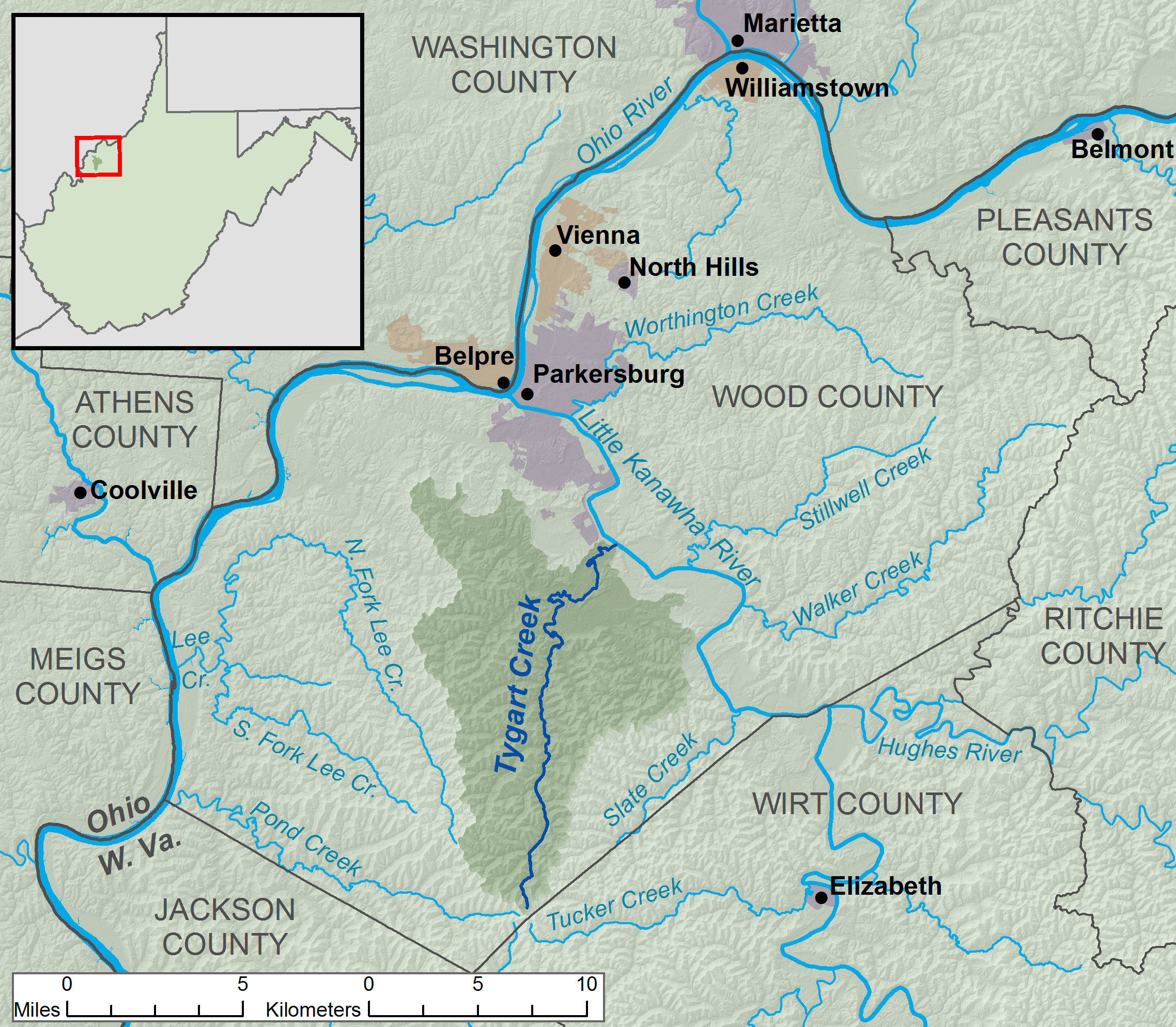
- Tygart Creek and its watershed in Wood County, West Virginia

Location
- Country: United States
- State: West Virginia
- County: Wood

Physical characteristics
- Source
  - location: south of Rockport
  - coordinates: 39.0536906°N 81.5542908°W
  - elevation: 923 ft (281 m)
- Mouth: Little Kanawha River
  - location: north of Mineral Wells
  - coordinates: 39.2047983°N 81.5104003°W
  - elevation: 587 ft (179 m)
- Length: 14.5 mi (23.3 km)
- Basin size: 51 sq mi (130 km^{2})

Tygart Creek is a tributary of the Little Kanawha River, 14.5 miles (23.3 km) long, in western West Virginia in the United States. Via the Little Kanawha and Ohio rivers, it is part of the watershed of the Mississippi River, draining an area of 51 square miles (130 km^{2}) on the unglaciated portion of the Allegheny Plateau.

Tygart Creek flows for its entire length in southern Wood County. It rises south of Rockport and flows generally northward through Rockport and Mineral Wells. It flows into the Little Kanawha River from the south, approximately 2 miles (3.2 km) north of Mineral Wells, and approximately 6.7 miles (10.8 km) upstream of the Little Kanawha River's mouth in Parkersburg.

According to the West Virginia Department of Environmental Protection, approximately 71% of the Tygart Creek watershed is forested, mostly deciduous. Approximately 28% is used for pasture and agriculture.

== See also ==
- List of rivers of West Virginia
