= New Englander =

New Englander may refer to:

- New Englanders, the inhabitants of the New England region in the Northeastern United States
- The New Englander, now Yale Review, a literary magazine
- New Englander (cocktail), a drink
- New Englander, now Armidale Express, an Australian newspaper
- A New Englander Over-Sea, a pen name for American writer, critic, and activist, John Neal

== See also ==
- New England (disambiguation)
