= Old England =

Old England may refer to:

- Old England (department store), a famous former retailer in central Brussels, Belgium
- Old England (horse), a racehorse
- Merry Old England
- "Old England", a song by The Waterboys on their album "This Is the Sea"
- Old England, an Art Nouveau building in Brussels housing the Musical Instrument Museum
- "The Roast Beef of Old England", a 1731 English patriotic ballad.
- Early medieval England, specifically before the Norman invasion

== See also ==
- Angeln
- Ye olde
- Old English (disambiguation)
- England
- English (disambiguation)
- New England (disambiguation)
