= Walker, West Virginia =

- Unincorporated community
- Location within West Virginia Location within the United States
- Coordinates: 39°10′45″N 81°23′02″W
- Country: United States
- State: West Virginia
- County: Wood
- Elevation: 623 ft (190 m)
- Time zone: UTC-5 (Eastern (EST))
  - Summer (DST): UTC-4 (EDT)
- ZIP code: 26180
- Area codes: 304 & 681
- GNIS feature ID: 1555907

Walker is an unincorporated community in Wood County, West Virginia, United States. Walker is located on County Route 7 in eastern Wood County, 4 miles (6.4 km) east of West Virginia Route 47, along Walker Creek and the North Bend Rail Trail. Walker has a post office with ZIP code 26180.
