= SS New England =

SS New England may refer to:

- SS New England (1920), a Design 1023 cargo ship built for the United States Shipping Board
- SS Scandinavian (ex-New England, ex-Romanic), a passenger steamship built in 1898
