= Joseph H. Diss Debar =

American artist and politician (1820-1905)

Joseph Hubert Diss Debar
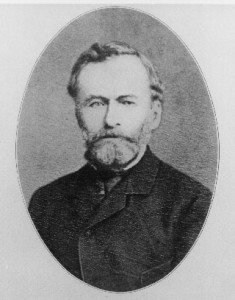
- Born: June 6, 1820; Strasbourg, France
- Died: January 13, 1905 (aged 84); Philadelphia, Pennsylvania, U.S.
- Resting place: West Laurel Hill Cemetery, Bala Cynwyd, Pennsylvania, U.S.
- Occupations: artist politician
- Spouse(s): Clara Levassor; Amelia Cain

Joseph Hubert Diss Debar (March 6, 1820 – January 13, 1905) was a French-born American artist and politician who designed the Seal of West Virginia in 1863. He served as a member of the West Virginia House of Delegates representing Doddridge County in 1864. He founded the German-Swiss immigrant colony of St. Clara, West Virginia, and served as West Virginia commissioner of immigration from 1864 to 1871. He published The West Virginia Hand-Book and Immigrant's Guide. A Sketch of the State of West Virginia. Because of his efforts, many Swiss farmers emigrated to West Virginia and founded the Town of Helvetia.

He left his second wife and lived with the notorious medium and fraudster, Ann O'Delia Diss Debar in New York City. Although she took his last name, they were never married but did have children together. They were both charged and sentenced to six months in jail for defrauding a lawyer with fake spiritualism.

== Biography ==
=== Early life and education ===
He was born on March 6, 1820, in the Alsace region of France near Strasbourg. The son of Francis Joseph Diss Debar — the estate manager for Cardinal Prince de Rohan — he was educated at schools in Strasbourg, Colmar, Muhlhausen, and Paris. He spoke English, French, German, Italian, and Spanish. He emigrated to the United States in 1842 from Liverpool, England, aboard the ship Britannia, where he met and befriended Charles Dickens.

=== Career ===
He first lived in Cincinnati and moved to Parkersburg, West Virginia, when he was hired in 1846 by John Dumas, who was an agent who negotiated land bonuses for French veterans of the American Revolutionary War. He worked as a land agent and represented a large portion of land in what would become north central West Virginia that was owned by James Swan before 1809.

Diss Debar moved to Doddridge County and founded the German-Swiss immigrant colony St. Clara, West Virginia, which he named after his first wife.

Great Seal of the State of West Virginia

Diss Debar was a proponent of West Virginia statehood and was asked to design the Great Seal of the State of West Virginia in 1863. He saw this as an opportunity to use the seal to promote the natural resources and economic potential of the state. The seal bears the state motto Montani Semper Liberi (Latin, "Mountaineers are Always Free"). The seal depicts a farmer and miner standing to the right and left of an ivy-covered stone with the date of entry into the Union, June 20, 1863. Two hunting rifles lay in front of the stone with a phrygian cap, or "cap of liberty".

Governor Arthur I. Boreman appointed Diss Debar commissioner of immigration and he worked in that role from 1864 to 1871. He was a member of the West Virginia House of Delegates representing Doddridge Country in 1864. He published The West Virginia Hand-Book and Immigrant's Guide in 1870, in English, German and Swedish. Because of his efforts, many Swiss farmers emigrated to West Virginia and founded the town of Helvetia.

Politically, he supported the Liberal Republicans in their efforts to come to terms with ex-Confederates in ending Radical Reconstruction within the state by 1872. He created numerous sketches of people and places in West Virginia. He moved to Philadelphia some time prior to 1880. He died January 13, 1905, in Philadelphia and was interred at West Laurel Hill Cemetery in Bryn Mawr, Pennsylvania.

== Personal life ==
His first wife, Clara Levassor died during childbirth in 1849. Their only child went to live with grandparents in Cincinnati, Ohio. In 1858, Diss Debar married a second time, to Amelia Cain, and together they had seven children although one died in infancy. Diss Debar owned an enslaved black woman named Mahala who worked as a domestic servant.

He left Amelia for Ann O'Delia Diss Debar, a notorious medium and fraudster, and they lived in New York City together. Although she took his last name, they were never married. They referred to themselves as Mademoiselle and General Diss Debar. Harry Houdini claimed in his book A Magician Among the Spirits, that a "couple of children" were born to them. They were both arrested for their roles in a conspiracy to defraud a lawyer, Luther R. Marsh, with fake spiritualism. They turned against each other during the court case and on June 18, 1888, they were both sentenced to six months in jail.

By 1900, Diss Debar and Amelia reconciled and lived together in Philadelphia.

== Publications ==
- For the Benefit of the Catholic Hospital and Orphan Asylum of Wheeling, Virginia, Distribution of Farm Lots in St. Clara Colony, Doddridge County, Virginia, A Chance of a Home for One Dollar, Wheeling, Virginia, 1860
- Two Men; Old John Brown and Stonewall Jackson of World-Wide Fame, Some Interesting Reminiscences by a Man Who Knew Both, Clarksburg, Clarksburg Telegraph, 1874.
- The West Virginia Handbook and Immigrant's Guide. A Sketch of the State of West Virginia, Parkersburg, Gibbens Bros., 1870.

== Gallery ==
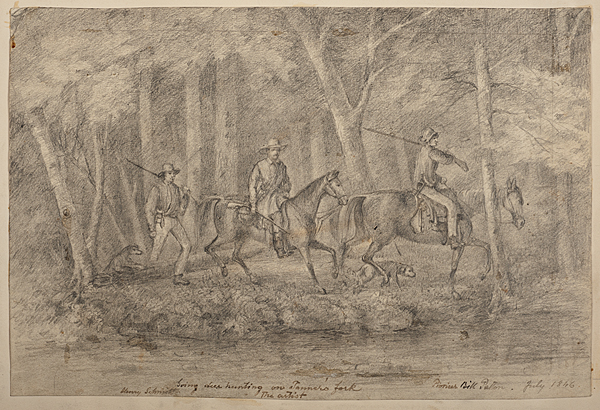
Hunting on Tanner's Fork, Gilmer & Calhoun Counties (1846)

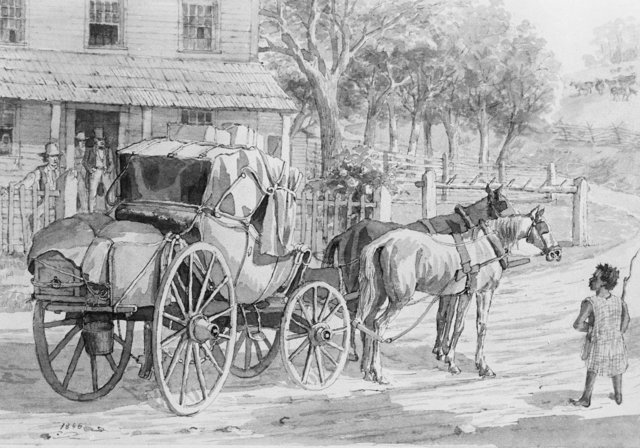
Stagecoach stop on the Northwestern Turnpike (1846)

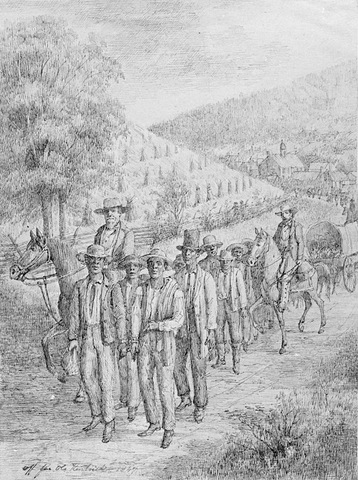
Slave gang from Virginia, transported to Kentucky (1847)

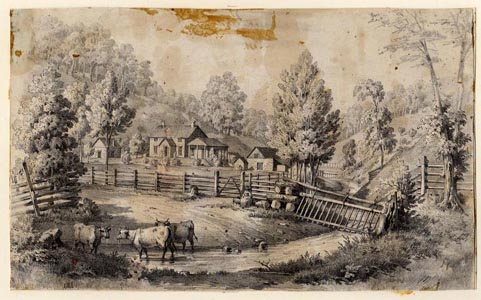
Debar House (built 1852), Doddridge County, [West] Virginia

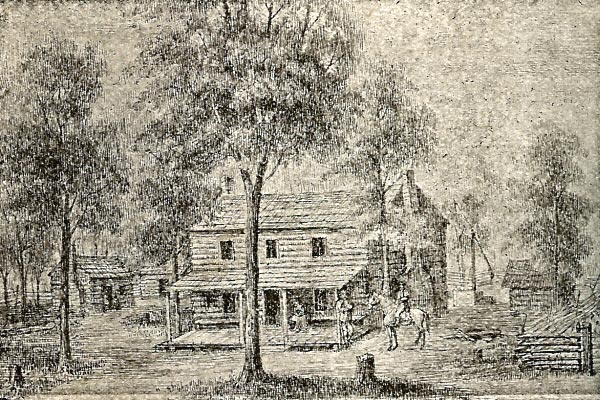
First courthouse of Wood County, [West] Virginia (built ca. 1802)
