= New England, West Virginia =

- Unincorporated community
- Location within West Virginia Location within the United States
- Coordinates: 39°12′25″N 81°42′31″W
- Country: United States
- State: West Virginia
- County: Wood
- Elevation: 879 ft (268 m)
- Time zone: UTC-5 (Eastern (EST))
  - Summer (DST): UTC-4 (EDT)
- Area codes: 304 & 681
- GNIS feature ID: 1555206

New England is an unincorporated community in Wood County, West Virginia, United States. New England is located on County Route 11 near the Ohio River, 8.9 miles (14.3 km) west-southwest of Parkersburg.
