= Seal of West Virginia =

Official government emblem of the U.S. state of West Virginia

Great Seal of the State of West Virginia

Versions
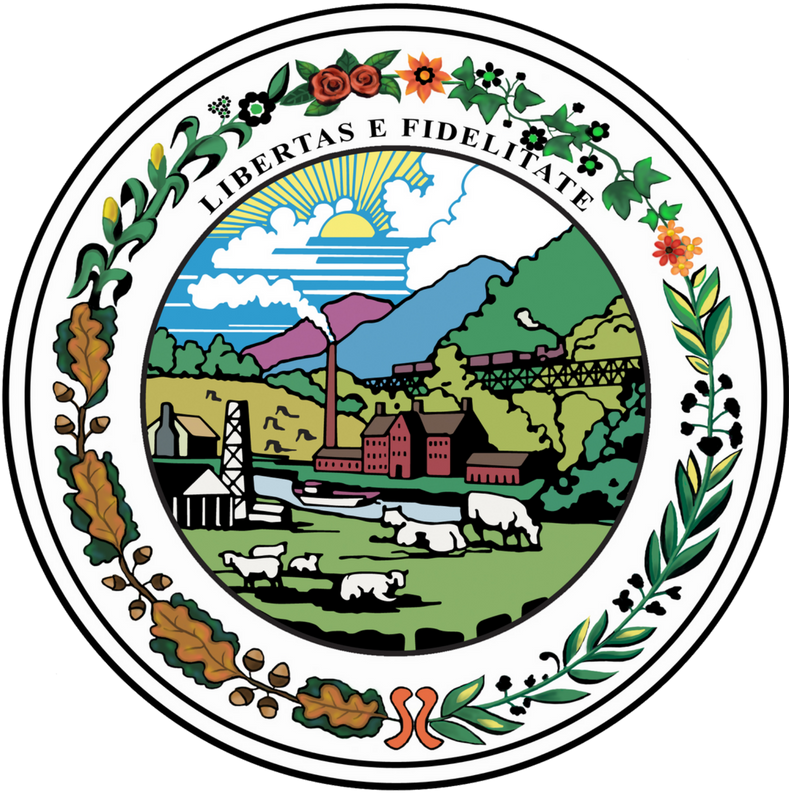
- Reverse

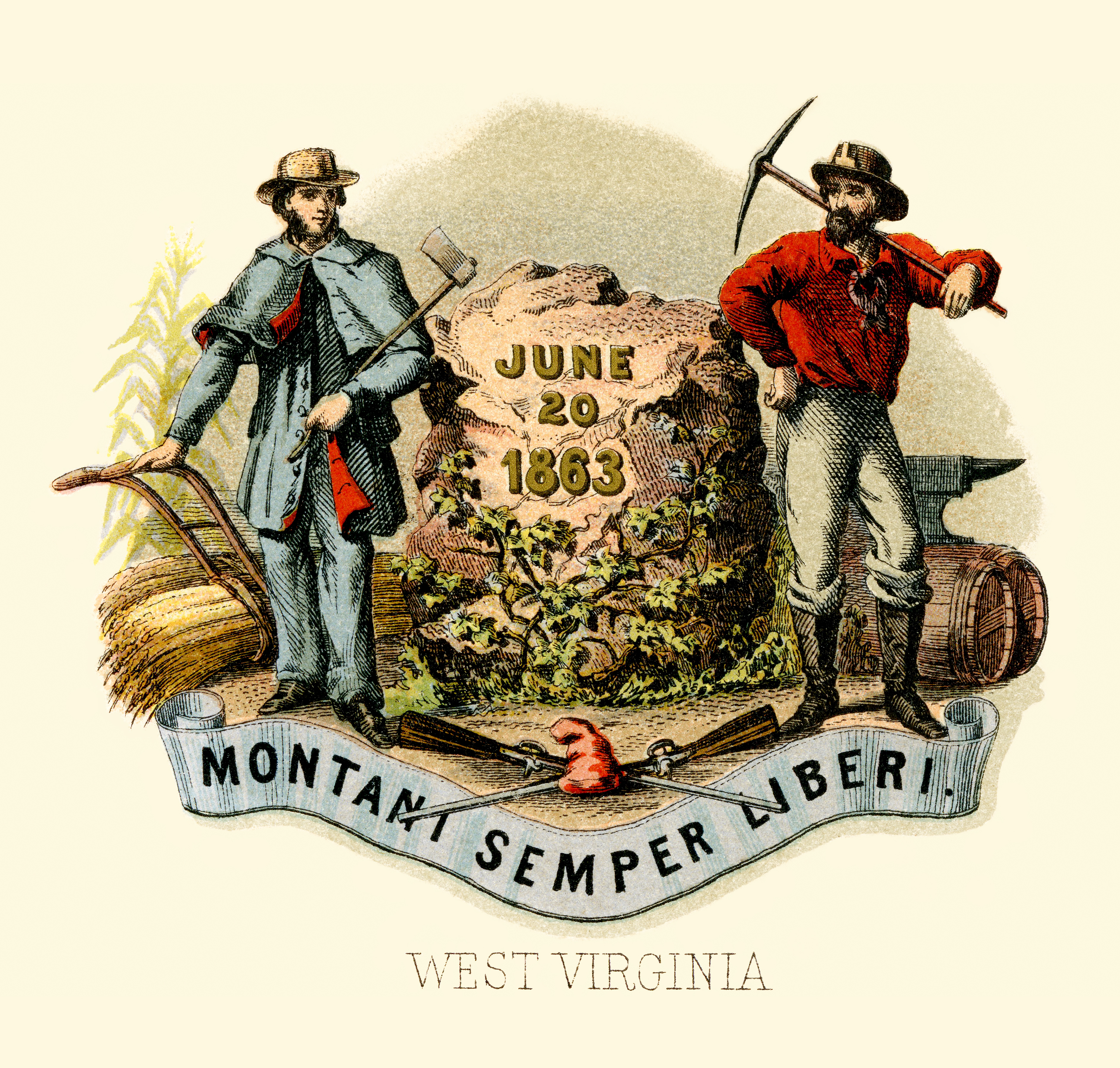
- Historical coat of arms (illustrated, 1876)
- Armiger: State of West Virginia
- Adopted: 1863
- Motto: Montani Semper Liberi; Libertas E Fidelitate

The Great Seal of the State of West Virginia, designed by Joseph H. Diss Debar, was adopted in September 1863. The obverse center of the seal contains a boulder that has been inscribed June 20, 1863, the date West Virginia became a state. In front of the boulder lie two crossed rifles and a liberty cap as a symbol of the state's fight for liberty. The two men on either side of the boulder represent agriculture and industry. On the left stands a farmer with an ax and plow before a cornstalk. On the other side stands a miner with a pickaxe, and behind him an anvil and sledge hammer. The outer ring contains the text "State of West Virginia" and the state's motto "Montani Semper Liberi", ("Mountaineers are Always Free"; the state nickname is "the Mountain State"). The reverse of the seal, also called the lesser seal, is the official seal of the governor. Its motto reads "Libertas E Fidelitate" ("Liberty out of Fidelity").

== Motto ==
The Latin phrase Montani Semper Liberi (English: "Mountaineers are Always Free") was adopted as the official state motto of West Virginia in Article II, Section 2-7, of the state constitution signed in 1872. This article specifically states: "[t]he present seal of the state, with its motto, "Montani Semper Liberi," shall be the great seal of the state of West Virginia, and shall be kept by the secretary of state, to be used by him officially, as directed by law". The phrase was suggested as the motto by Joseph H. Diss Debar, the artist who created the state's Great Seal.

The seal as used in the form of a coat of arms on the state flag

The seal of the governor of West Virginia

Montani Semper Liberi is also part of the coat of arms for the Colombian city of Bucaramanga.
