= Fairmont Marion County Transit Authority =

- Founded: 1973
- Headquarters: 400 Quincy Street, Fairmont
- Service type: bus service, paratransit
- Routes: 14 includes Saturday route
- Stations: Monroe Street
- Fleet: Champion, Frieghrliner, Ford, IC
- Fuel type: Diesel, Gasoline, Electric
- Website: fmcta.com

The Fairmont Marion County Transit Authority (FMCTA) provides public transportation to the citizens of Fairmont and Marion County, West Virginia, United States.

== History ==
On December 31, 1971, the City Lines buses ended service in Marion County and Fairmont, West Virginia. This left the citizens of the area without any type of mass transit. The inauguration of a new system lasted over a year and a half.

In January 1973, the governing bodies of Marion County and Fairmont formed the Fairmont Marion County Transit Authority (FMCTA) as a separate government entity, funded equally at $60,000 by each of the bodies. The planning, purchasing, scheduling and recruitment process lasted five months. On June 7, 1973, the seventeen-month period of no transit ended with the operation of FMCTA's first bus.

May 23, 1973 Michael Pasquale was named Manager / Dispatcher and since that time Woody Conrad served 11 years, H. B. Herb Pudder served 5 years, Joe Rager 12 years and George Levitsky(2nd Certified Community Transit Manager in WV, was Community Transit Association of America's Manager of the Year in 2009) served 21 years, as Managers of the Transit Authority. In January 2024 Jeff Mullenax was named General Manager by the Authority's board of directors. The Transit Authority celebrated serving Marion County with public transportation for 50 years in 2023. In 2014 US Senator Joe Manchin, Delegates Mike Caputo, Tim Manchin and Linda Longstreth, and Governor Tomblin offered congratulatory letters and a citation from the House of Delegates of the West Virginia Legislature.

Originally service operated on seven routes in and around Fairmont plue five additional routes serving rural communities. The original routes were West End, East Side, Rivesville, Barrackville (with select trips to Chesapeake), Watson/Mall, Monongah (with select trips to Worthington) and Jackson Addition. Weekly routes were Kingmont and Manningotn on Tuesdays, Carolina, Fairview and later Colfax on Wednesdays).

Soon after, FMCTA began to expand the service area. The original fleet of buses consisted of Mercedes-Benz buses and later in the 1980s of Flexettes which were light duty buses built by Flexible. Grumman-Olsens (which look like bread trucks) were added for rural route service. Large Bluebirds which resembled school buses were bought to use on charters and interstate trips until insurance became cost prohibitive. They were by far the largest buses operated by FMCTA with 41 seats. The fleet for many years consisted of Goshen Coach buses, Ford mid-sized buses, vans and a trolley. The fleet now stands around 30 vehicles that have various seating capacities ranging from four to thirty two seats and are fully equipped to meet the Americans with Disabilities (ADA) specifications and 4 non ADA service vehicles.

== Riders ==
Clientele of the FMCTA are primarily senior citizens, the transportationally disadvantaged, and persons of lower income. Other riders include Fairmont State University students, commuters looking for an economically advantageous alternative to driving, and customers aware of the environmental benefits that transit provides.

== Funding ==
When FMCTA began, it was well received by the community and turned a profit at the end of its first Fiscal Year, 1975. The Board of Directors were determined that the Authority could operate at half the funding level and thus cut the funding by fifty percent. In 1978, the City of Fairmont began to cut funding and managed to exclude transit funding entirely. Marion County continued funding until it too discontinued funding for transit in 1988. Currently, the Authority's greatest source of income is provided by the countywide levy providing 75% of the annual budget. The remaining amount comes from federal highway taxes and farebox revenue.

== Facility ==
When the FMCTA began service in 1973, service was provided out of a bus garage on Maryland Avenue in Fairmont. In 1980, the Authority was given a federal grant to build a new facility which included a garage, maintenance and office space as well as bus parking and fueling stations. In 1996, additional equipment parking was added in the lot adjacent to the new facility on Quincy Street. Another floor was added to garage in 2007 as well as additional parking. In May 2015 the transfer station was moved from on the street by the courthouse to a renovated 4 story stucco building located @ 401 Monroe Street with a cover area for waiting and Monday through Friday an indoor waiting area for our passengers.

== Fares ==
Fares range from $.50 in the core of the city to $2.00 on trips to Clarksburg or Morgantown. Fares increase at $.25 increments as the bus gets further from downtown. Transfers are free and only valid at the Transfer station. In the late 80s, for a short time, the base fare increased to $.75. This placed a hardship on the locals and the base fare returned to $.50 after the passage of the first excess levy in 1988. In July 2016 the board approved along with the County Commission that veterans, upon registering for a pass, could ride for free anywhere their fixed routes travel.

== Destination signs ==
The first Mercedes buses lacked destination signs to tell the passengers where the bus was going. Makeshift signs were made on pieces of cardboard scrawled on by a black marker. This issue was solved as more buses were purchased. The first bunch of Goshens purchased only had the overhead scroll sign and lacked a sign on the side of the buses. The next batch of buses purchased in the 1990s solved this issue, however it was tough convincing the bus drivers to use the side destination sign and it often remained on white blank or it was removed completely. New scrolls were purchased for the older buses and came equipped in the newer buses with exposures reading Out of Service and Garage. These were added to end confusion of passengers when buses return to the Courthouse at the end of a trip to discharge passengers only. Waiting passengers have no way of knowing the bus is only dropping off passengers and they often approach the bus only to be told the driver is going to the garage. Unfortunately, these helpful exposures are never displayed. The first bus with an electronic destination sign was a Champion brand bus added in 2006 which will hopefully put an end to the white blank days which at times appeared on the front of buses as well when there was not real signage available. This was the case for new or experimental routes such as those to Clarksburg Malls, Montana and Bunner's Ridge.

== Routes ==
Originally bus service operated over seven routes serving Fairmont plus five routes which operated weekly to surrounding rural communities. Daily routes operated were West End, East Side, Rivesville, Barrackville (with some trips extending to Chesapeake), Watson/Mall, Monongah (with some trips extending to Worthington) and Jackson Addition. Rural routes included Kingmont and Mannington which both operated on Tuesdays, Carolina, Fairview and Colfax operating on Wednesdays. There was also a route that went to Fairview via Barrackville and Monumental as well as the current Fairview route via Rivesville.

The Fairmont-Marion County Transit Authority (FMCTA) currently serves most of the county as well as the I-79 corridor. The system covers 16 routes with various trip patterns. Service operates Monday through Friday between 7 am and 6 pm with five routes operating on Saturday between 8 am and 5 pm. Comparable ADA Paratransit service is also provided to complement the fixed routes. The buses use a pulse system that has all routes converging at a single transfer point in downtown Fairmont on Jefferson Street next to the Marion County Courthouse.

FMCTA provides service to the major towns in Marion County, including Fairmont, Mannington, Fairview, Rivesville, Barrackville, Pleasant Valley and White Hall. Service is also provided to Clarksburg to the malls and the Veterans' Hospital as well as service to Morgantown to Ruby Memorial Hospital.

Core routes include the Edgemont Loop, Watson/Mall and Mount Harmony. Other routes serve Barrackville, Carolina, Unity Terrace, Jackson Addition, Mannington, Pleasant Valley, Rivesville and Fairview. All routes operate weekdays while only core service operates Saturdays. Saturday service was started in the mid-1980s. Sunday service has never been provided. Weekday evening service existed for a few years in the early 90s but after proving to be unsuccessful, it was discontinued. Two evening trips were again added in 2007 to serve the Mall and Fairmont State University but they have since been discontinued.

=== Current routes ===
Barrackville
Until the mid-1980s, service operated out Route 250 and through Barrackville to the coal mine hourly with some trips extending to Chesapeake. In the mid-1980s, service was reduced to the current schedule of four trips a day running about 2–3 hours apart. Three trips are provided on Saturday as well. In May 2008, the last trip of the day was combined with the last trip to Metz. This last trip has since been separated out from the Mannington trip.

Campus Loop
This route began in October 2013 and leaves the Courthouse at 9, 10, 12, 2 and 4 operating via Locust Avenue, circling the University to the Feaster Center then returning downtown via Oakwood Road and Fairmont Avenue.

Carolina/Worthington
Service originally operated twice one day a week. This service in the mid-1980s absorbed service to Worthington and Monongah and operated four trips a day out Locust Avenue and US 19 to Monongah and into Carolina via State Route 218 to 4th Street. Service used to travel to Worthington before going to Carolina but that ended when the VA Hospital route was initiated, which serves Worthington, West Virginia on its way to Clarksburg. The last trip of the day leaving the Courthouse at 5:10 pm was the first to be discontinued in the early 90s and most recently in 2004 the 330pm trip was discontinued. This trip was unique in that it was signed Mannington and traveled from downtown via Fairmont Avenue then cutting over to Locust Avenue via 7th Street, providing the only service on 7th Street. From Locust it continued as the regular Carolina bus would then from Carolina cut over to Route 250 and resumed the Mannington route via Farmington and Rachel to Mannington. The trip then returned to Fairmont via Route 250. The remaining two trips alternate their trip pattern to Carolina. The first trip operates via Fairmont Ave to Carolina, returning via Locust and the next trip operates in the reverse pattern.

Clarksburg Malls
This route began in the mid-1990s. Until the late 1990s, when new buses were purchased, there was no destination sign available for this route so a white blank was displayed with a nicely printed sign placed in the front window reading Meadowbrook. Three of the Watson/Mall trips that left the Courthouse at 30 after the hour were converted to this route. Until 2007 when the last trip was eliminated, service operated three times a day from downtown to Meadowbrook Mall via Locust, Country Club, US 250, Middletown Mall, I-79, Newpoint and Eastpoint to Meadowbrook. The route returns to downtown Fairmont via I-79, Middletown and the same route. In fall 2007, service was reduced to operate only on Wednesdays. The service now serves the Walmart in White hall and operates out Fairmont Avenue instead of Locust. In spring 2009, this was further reduced to operate only the first three Wednesdays of the month. The last Wednesday the trip operates to Morgantown Mall instead.

Edgemont Loop
The Loop bus used to provide service hourly out Locust, Country Club and Fairmont Avenue alternating the direction of travel on even hours via Fairmont Avenue and on odd hours via Locust Avenue. This service was established in the mid-1980s and operated the highest frequency at the time of any route every hour with 8 trips on Saturday. The Westchester loop was not part of the original route. Now all service operates via Locust, Country Club and Fairmont Avenue. The route deviates and travels through Fairmont State University when classes are in session. This bus provides service to Fairmont General Hospital and in the mid-90s deviations into Marion Square and Country Club Plaza were added. This bus usually leaves the Courthouse five to ten minutes after other buses leave on the hour because while the route was designed to take an hour to complete, trips generally take forty minutes to complete. In the early 90s, an extension via Route 250 was added to serve the new Marion County Senior Citizens Center on Maplewood Drive. In the mid-1990s, Saturday service was combined with the Watson/Mall route. Trips returning from the Mall on Saturday traveled via Country Club, Locust and the hospital. As of fall 2007, service to the Senior Center is only available on request and the Village Way Loop north of Cardinal Place has been discontinued. In the fall of 2009, two Saturday trips were eliminated to allow for new service to Pleasant Valley utilizing the same bus.
Beginning September 2013, the Unity Terrace route was combined with the Edgemont Loop. Trip route now operates the same up to 3rd/Fairmont, then proceeds via the 3rd Street Bridge, Gateway Connector, Leonard Street to Unity Terrace then returns to the Courthouse via the Gateway Connector and High Level Bridge every hour.

Fairview
This route was one of the original rural routes which operated twice, one day a week. Later in the 1980s, it was reduced to operate only on the second Friday of the month. Since then the route has remained virtually unchanged and operates three trips daily to Fairview via a direct route out Pennsylvania Avenue and US Route 19 through Baxter, Grant Town and Basnettville to Fairview. The first two trip times have been altered with the last trip of the day at 3 pm remaining the same. With the elimination of trips from the Rivesville route in summer 2010, the Fairview route was extended into Greentown going to and from Fairview.

FSU/Mall
This route was started in spring 2012 to connect Fairmont State University to the Middletown Mall. At 2 pm and 6 pm, trips travel via Locust Avenue through the University then via Locust, Country Club and Route 250 to Walmart and the Mall. Buses return the same way.

Gateway/Mall
With the opening of the Gateway Connector, a new route was initiated between downtown and the Middletown Mall via the Gateway Connector and a stop at Unity Terrace and the East Park Trailer Park. Service operates from the Courthouse at 1030 am and 1230 pm. Beginning in autumn 2011, the route was extended to include Boothsville on a trial basis. In spring 2012, this route was re-routed again to travel to the mall then out to Deerfield. The route was modified again in May 2012 to operate out the Gateway Connector to Walmart and the Middletown Mall, then on to the United Hospital Center in Harrison County. Both trips return to Fairmont via I-79 and the Gateway Connector not serving Walmart or the Mall.

Jackson Addition
This is the shortest route provided and the only route to provide service solely within the Fairmont city limits. The service originally operated hourly but in the 80s was cut back to two trips a day. Since then the service has operated four trips a day with the first being at 10:30 am with the last being at 3 pm from the Courthouse. The first trip was originally at 8:30 am with the last at 3:30 pm. The route weaves through Jackson Addition via Ogden, Baltimore and Maple Avenue to Lewis Street. The bus then returns to the Courthouse via Spence Street to Pennsylvania Avenue. Service was altered at some point to add service to Grafton and Holbert Streets. In the fall of 2009, a 5th trip was added leaving the Courthouse at 8 am. In summer 2010, service was extended to Fairhills Plaza before continuing back downtown. This was to offset the loss of service by discontinuing five trips on the Rivesville route which also serves the Plaza.

Mannington/Metz
Service to Mannington is offered via US Route 250 with deviations into Farmington and Rachel. Originally service was provided only twice a day, one day a week. Service was increased in the early 1980s to operate two trips the 2nd and 4th Wednesday of the month. In the 80s service was extended to Hundred and operated the 1st and 3rd Wednesday of the month. This extension into Wetzel County was discontinued in the late 80s. In the early 90s, service was first extended to Metz, then later the Wetzel County Line and finally in the mid-1990s service was again extended to Hundred. It takes about forty minutes round trip for the bus to travel between Mannington and Hundred. On this stretch drivers say they had three semi-regular riders use the service. This service operated until early 2006 when it was cut back to turn around at the big tree on State Fork Rd in Metz. The Hundred service continued up Route 250 and ended at the ballpark in Hundred originally but was later changed to cut back at the feed store right at 250 in Hundred. Now, service will continue to Hundred only upon request on the 9 am and 330 pm trip. There are currently five trips operating to Mannington with three continuing to Metz. The other two trips terminate at the Red Dot Pharmacy in Mannington. In the 90s, there was a 5 am trip leaving the Courthouse and operating only as far as Farmington. Also until the mid-90s, Saturday service was provided on four trips. In May 2008, the last Barrackville trip of the day was combined to operate with the last trip to Metz. This last trip later separated out the Barrackville portion again. When the Mannington In-Town route was discontinued in March 2011, areas of Mannington served by that short lived route were incorporated into this route including an extension to the trailer park. A 5 pm departure from Fairmont was added to Mannington in May 2012.

Morgantown Mall
This service started in the spring of 2009. This route only operates on the last Wednesday of the month providing two trips to the Morgantown Mall.

Mount Harmony/Meadowdale/East Side/Smithtown
This is the main bus providing service to the east side of Fairmont. The route originally was called East Side and operated hourly via State St, Haymond, Morgantown Avenue and ending on Suncrest Blvd at Westinghouse. Service was also provided to Unity Terrace before a separate route for that service was established. The route was later extended and called Meadowdale and was referred to often as the East Side Loop. In the early 1980s, service was reduced to 6 trips a day and 4 trips on Saturday. Later, hourly service was resumed. With the extension to Meadowdale, the route operated via the 3rd Street Bridge, East Side Hospital, Columbia, State, Haymond, Morgantown Avenue and State Route 73 to Jordan Road in Mount Harmony. In the late 80s at some point the route was changed to the current routing from the 3rd Street Bridge via East Park Avenue and Speedway to SR73, diverting into the Gabriel Brothers and continuing to Jordan Road in Mount Harmony. The return route was changed to SR73, Suncrest Blvd, up Dixie Avenue and The Drive then back to Morgantown Ave, Haymond, State, Columbia and Newtown returning to Merchant and the 3rd Street Bridge. The Saturday version of this route turns back at Speedway and Suncrest Boulevard instead of continuing out to Mount Harmony except for three trips when it serves Gabriel's. These buses are signed East Side. However, until the late 90s, there was no destination sign available for these trips and buses signed a white blank for this service. Also for a few years in the '90s there was evening service provided on the East Side route with a trip leaving the Courthouse at 6:30 pm and 8:00 pm.

In the 1990s, the route was split into two trip patterns. On the odd hours, the route follows the route described above but after arriving Jordan Rd/SR 73, the route makes a left and goes out 73 to Smithtown where it turns around the golf course. These trips do not serve Dixie Avenue and The Drive.

Pleasant Valley/Mall
This is the new name of the old Benton’s Ferry route, changed in 1989. Benton’s Buses traveling this route three times a day operate via the 3rd Street Bridge, Newton and Columbia to State Street then out Pleasant Valley Road diverting up to Millersville, returning to Pleasant Valley Road and diverting again to serve Kingmont. From here the route continues via I-79 to US 250 in South Fairmont then goes to the Wal-Mart before terminating at the Middletown Mall. Service returns to the Courthouse via the same route, minus service into Millersville and Kingmont because of time constraints.

In the early 90s, I-79 caused the last trip leaving the Courthouse at 3:00 pm to be temporarily discontinued, leaving only the 10 am and 1 pm trips, until the work on I-79 was completed a year later. This trip instead operated to the Mall via Watson. In spring 2006, the 8:30 am trip from the Courthouse on the Watson/Mall route was changed to return downtown from the Mall via Pleasant Valley. In fall 2009, Saturday service was added for the first time ever with two trips and three trips the first Saturday of the month.

Rivesville/Greentown/County Line
This core route operates hourly to Rivesville via Pennsylvania Avenue and US 19 and Clayton Street to Greentown. In the 1980s, service was reduced to five trips a day with one trip turning back at Dakota. The rest of the trips continued to Greentown. Since then, hourly service was restored and until 2004, service diverted into Bellview to serve the Old Post Office. Service diverts into Fairhills Plaza still and for a while in 2003, the four Saturday trips turned back at the Plaza.

In the 1990s, this route was extended to the Monongalia County Line via US 19 on four trips, reduced to three trips in 2004. Drivers report that in the ten years this extension has existed, they cannot recall picking up a single passenger. In the first half of 2008, two trips were eliminated and the last trip of the day now operates to County Line only upon request. In summer 2010, 5 more trips were eliminated from the Rivesville route thus eliminating hourly service on this route. On July 31, 2011, service to the County Line was discontinued and service via Highland Avenue was changed to only operate on return trips from Rivesville.

Ruby Memorial/Morgantown
This is the route that serves Morgantown. It is believed this route began in the late 1980s. Service is offered four times a day with the third trip of the day reversing the trip pattern in Morgantown. The first two trips travel through East Side Fairmont down East Park Avenue to I-79, I-68 to Don Knotts Boulevard in Morgantown. From here the route, changed in the mid 90s to accommodate changes made by Morgantown Transit. The route serves the Depot, Courthouse then continues up University Avenue to Ruby Memorial, the WVU Medical Center and then takes Patteson Avenue then Route 7 through Star City back to I-79 where the bus returns to Fairmont. For a short time in the early 90s there was a fourth trip added leaving the Courthouse at 3:45 pm. After gaining no ridership, this was discontinued and the trip was discontinued leaving the 2:20 pm trip as the last one. In the summer of 2009, a fourth trip was added leaving the Fairmont Courthouse at 5:10 pm. The 2:20 trip now leaves Fairmont at 2:00 and the 5:10 has been moved to leave Fairmont at 4:55.

VA Hospital
This was the original Clarksburg route and like the Morgantown route, it is believed to be started in the late '80s. This simple route travels from the Courthouse up US 19 to Clarksburg, providing service to the various points along 19 such as Worthington, Shinnston and Hepzibah. The bus goes to the Clarksburg Library and then the VA Hospital in Hartland. The last of the three weekday trips reveres its trip pattern in Clarksburg and serves the VA before the Library. The bus returns to Fairmont via 19.

Watson/Mall
While not technically a core route as it has not provided hourly service since the early 1980s, it is the route with the highest ridership. Trip times have been added and deleted numerous times over the years with this route which resulted in 30 minute headways. In the mid-1980s, six weekday and five Saturday trips were operated. In the early '90s there were three evening trips provided which left the Courthouse at 5:30 pm, 7:00 pm and 8:40 pm. The bus operating these trips alternated service with the two evening East Side trips. Service currently operates hourly with the exception when trips operate to the mall via Pleasant Valley instead. The route travels out Fairmont Avenue turning up Mary Lou Retton Drive and making the occasional diversion up Hunsaker and Calvin Streets then back to Mary Lou Retton Drive. The route was altered in the '90s to travel from Mary Lou Retton Drive via Fairlane and Warren back to US 250. From here the bus continues to the Wal-Mart then terminates at the Mall where it then runs back down 250 via Watson to downtown. Beginning in late 2005, the 8:30 am trip from the Courthouse returns to town via Pleasant Valley. In 2007, two evening trips were added again leaving town at 6:10 pm and 7:10 pm following the Saturday Mall route pattern going out Fairmont Avenue and returning from the Mall via Locust Avenue. These have since been discontinued.

In the mid-1990s, Saturday service on this route was altered to absorb service on the Edgemont route. Trips operate to the mall via the regular route but when they arrive at Fairmont Ave/Country Club Rd upon their return, they travel back to the Courthouse via Country Club, Locust and the hospital. In the fall of 2009, two of the Saturday trips were moved to serve the Pleasant Valley/Mall route instead of travelling via Watson and Locust Avenue.

This route now serves the Healthplex at the mall.

=== Discontinued routes ===
Airport

Between May 2009 and March 2010, FMCTA offered transportation to the North Central West Virginia Airport in Bridgeport. Buses left the Courthouse at 7 am and again at 2 pm. Demand response service to and from the airport was also available. Pickups and drop offs were made throughout Harrison and Marion Counties.

Benton’s Ferry

This route began in the 1980s and operated until 1989 when the Benton’s Ferry Bridge closed. Service operated 2 trips every Tuesday and Thursday. The route was later renamed PV/Mall (Pleasant Valley/Mall) and the routing changed to operate via I-79. See Pleasant Valley Route for more information.

Boothsville

This route existed in the early '90s. Two trips were made once a week.

Bunner Ridge

For a while in the early 90s, two trips on Wednesday were operated from the Courthouse at 9 am and 2 pm to Bunner’s Ridge.

Clarksburg Express

This service operated between 2007 and early 2010. Two express trips operated weekdays between the Fairmont and Clarksburg Courthouses.

Giant Eagle

For a few years from about 2001 to 2005, a Thursday trip was provided from the various senior citizens complexes in downtown Fairmont to the Giant Eagle to allow them to do their grocery shopping.

Grassey Run/Winfield

The Grassey Run-Winfield service was established in the mid-1980s and operated 1 trip when Westinghouse worked.

Kingmont

This service operated until the early '80s making 2 trips, one day a week. Service was later picked up by the Pleasant Valley/Mall route which diverts into Kingmont on request.

Mannington In-Town

Service around the town of Mannington and to the Rainbow Plaza was added in the Summer of 2010 to complement the fixed route service between Mannington and Fairmont. Hourly trips leave the Red Dot Pharmacy from 8 am to 4 pm and travel past Hough Park to Chestnut Street then out to Rainbow Plaza returning to the Pharmacy via Baltimore/Burt Avenue and looping around the library. Service was discontinued on March 1, 2011 and incorporated partially into the Mannington/Fairmont route.

Mannington/Mall

This bus operated on Tuesdays only and started at the Red Dot Pharmacy in Mannington at 10:30 am and operated to Middletown Mall via Route 250, 218, 19, Koon’s Run, Industrial Park Rd to Route 73, Wal-Mart and the Mall. The return trip left the Mall at 3:30 pm and returned to Mannington via the same route. In the mid-1990s the trip was reduced to operate only on the second Tuesday of each month.

Monongah

This route operated from the 1970s until mid-1980s. Service operated hourly with every second trip also serving Worthington. Service to Monongah and Worthington was later folded into the Carolina route when service on that line was increased to three trips a day.

Monongah Heights

Service on this route began with two trips in 2007. Buses operate to Middletown Mall and Wal-Mart via Fairmont Avenue/Route 250 then via Industrial Park Drive/Route 58 to Monongah Heights then returns the same way to the Courthouse. On March 31, 2008, this route was discontinued due to lack of ridership.

Montana Mines

Service for a short time was provided on Thursdays to Montana Mines at 9 am and 2 pm. Service was discontinued in the early 1990s.

NA Philips/Westinghouse

Service has always been provided to the Westinghouse lighting plant operating as a service route. While ridership sharply decreased when NA Philips took over Westinghouse, two trips a day operated to the plant until the plant made another major cutback in personnel. Service on this route has since ended.

Rock Lake/Colfax

Service originally operated two trips a day, one day a week. The service was later extended to include Rock Lake and provided two trips every Tuesday. Service was later increased to provide service on Tuesday and Thursday at 8:30 am and 1 pm to Rock Lake via East Park Avenue and SR 310 to Valley Falls Road to the Rock Lake Dam. Trips returned to the Courthouse via Levels Road into Colfax to the Post Office and came back up Colfax Road to SR 310, East Park back downtown.

Early in the '90s, the Colfax service was cut out of the route and trip times were changed to 9 am and 2 pm and service was reduced to operate Tuesdays only. This rather oddly operated service was religiously patronized by two passengers each week until the mid 90s, a son and his mother. When one of them passed, the other continued to ride this bus until he could no longer do so. The service was at one time cutback to terminate at Morgans Crossroads at the old S & D Grocery and did not continue to Rock Lake. The service was later reinstated to Rock Lake then cut back again to the Crossroads. There used to be the occasional passenger on this route. If there were no passengers on the morning trip, the afternoon trip usually did not operate. This route was finally discontinued in 2007.

Unity Terrace

Four trips have always operated on this route but the times they leave the Courthouse have been altered. This route crosses the 3rd Street Bridge at times and the High Level Bridge at other times, depending on the driver and operates up around the old East Side Hospital and continues up Columbia to McKinney, Barnes, Dayton and Leonard to the Unity Terrace Apartments where it returns to town via the same route. Beginning in the autumn of 2011, service to the Machin Clinic will be eliminated with service being added to the East Park Mobile Home Park. In September 2013, this route was combined with the Edgemont Loop to provide hourly service.

West End

This was the original West Side loop before the Edgemont Loop was established in the mid-1980s.

== Fleet of bus years ==
Vehicle/year	2006	2007	2009	2012	2014	2015	2018	2019	2021
Champion	1	7	0	0	0	0	0	0	0
ford	2	5	4	0	0	4	4	2	0
Frieghtliner	0	0	0	0	4	0	2	0	2
IC	0	0	0	2	0	0	0	0	0
