= Idamay, West Virginia =

- Census-designated place (CDP)
- Location in Marion County and the state of West Virginia.
- Coordinates: 39°29′49″N 80°15′25″W
- Country: United States
- State: West Virginia
- County: Marion

Area
  - Total: 0.882 sq mi (2.28 km^{2})
  - Land: 0.881 sq mi (2.28 km^{2})
  - Water: 0.001 sq mi (0.0026 km^{2})
- Elevation: 1,178 ft (359 m)

Population (2020)
  - Total: 542
  - Density: 615/sq mi (238/km^{2})
- Time zone: UTC-5 (Eastern (EST))
  - Summer (DST): UTC-4 (EDT)
- ZIP code: 26576
- Area codes: 304 & 681
- GNIS feature ID: 1554762

Idamay is a census-designated place (CDP) in Marion County, West Virginia, United States. Idamay is located along West Virginia Route 218, 1 mile (1.6 km) south of Farmington. Idamay has a post office with ZIP code 26576. As of the 2020 census, its population was 542 (down from 611 at the 2010 census).

== History ==
The community was named after Ida May Watson, the daughter of Consolidation Coal co-founder James Otis Watson and sister of Caroline Watson Fleming, after whom the neighboring town of Carolina was named.

Consolidation Coal began construction on their #87 Idamay mine and barracks in 1915. As the mine thrived, company houses sprung up, either built on site by the carpenter's crew or transported from closed mines in Pennsylvania. The mine was fully operational by 1917, bringing the railroad, teams of migrant workers, and an established, fully self-sustaining town. Miners and their families were supplied with a recreation hall, company store, first class school, community gardens, concerts, and picnics. Company nurses and doctors were always on call, and the street car system supplied an easy means to the cities of Fairmont and Mannington. Throughout the 1920s and 30s, Idamay was most notable for her championship miner's league team, the Ida Mae Fence Busters. Both mine league teams and professional baseball teams from across the country traveled for an attempt to usurp the champions, most failed.

In the early 1950s, Bethlehem Coal bought the mine and renamed it to Bethlehem #44, which it is most well-known as today. Under Bethlehem, the Idamay mine was among the first to successfully utilize a roofing bolt system making it a working model for new mines. As unionization took hold and mine scrip dissolved, Bethlehem started selling company houses to miners. In order to maintain the communal way of life, the Idamay Improvement Association was founded in 1953 establishing by-laws for the development, general maintenance, and future of the town. When Bethlehem closed the mine in 1971, many of the remaining properties were deeded to the Association. The Idamay Improvement Association continues to oversee the town today.

== Gallery ==
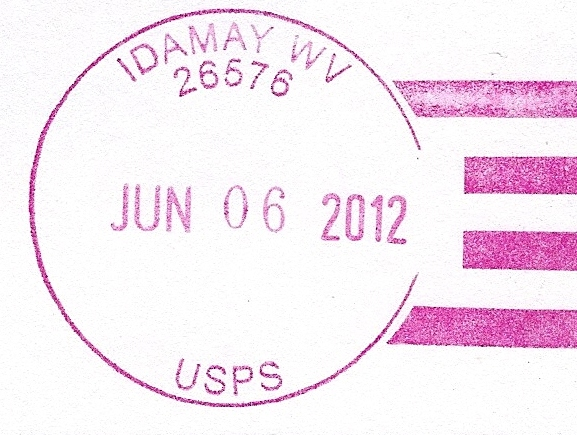
Idamay postmark

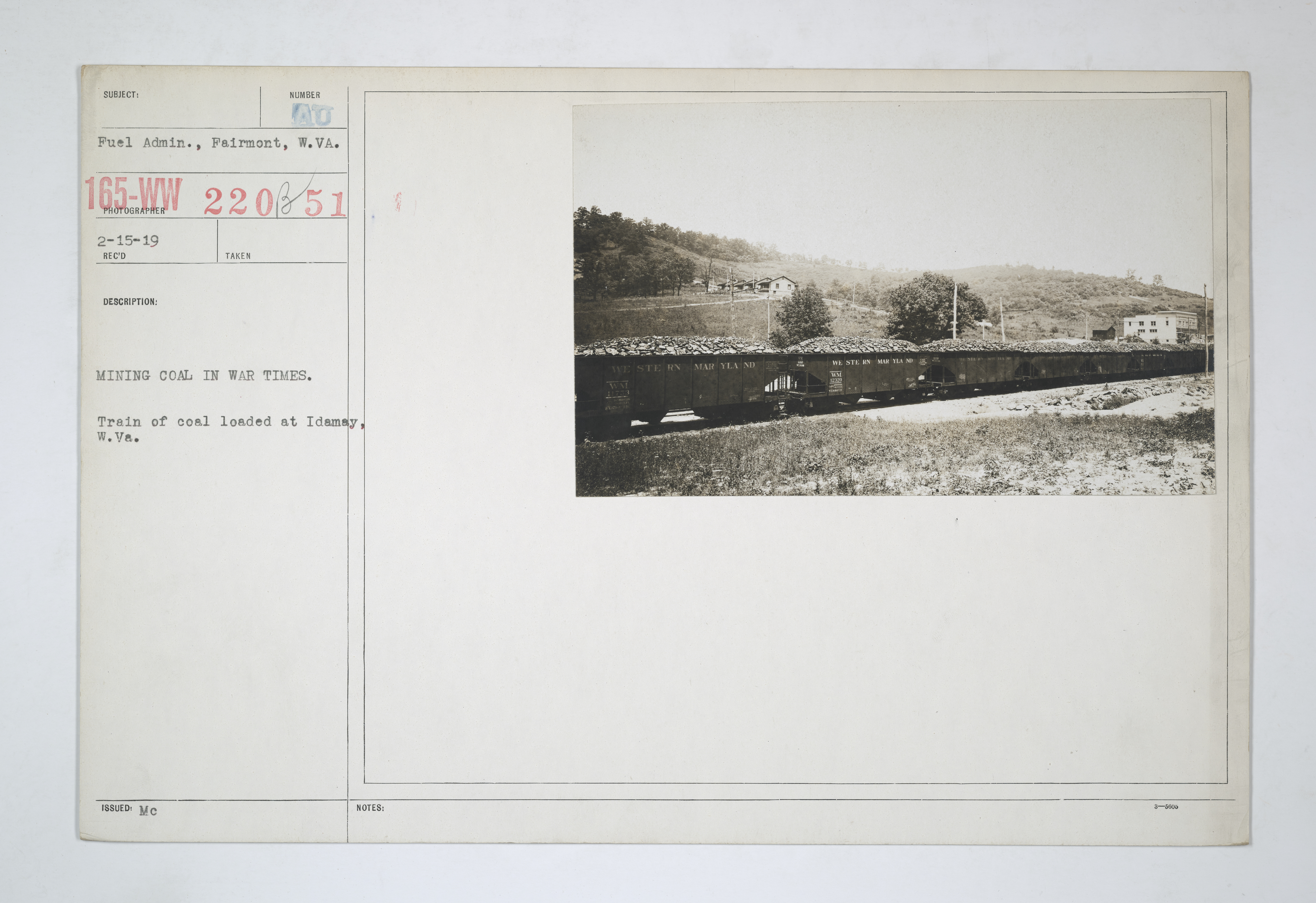

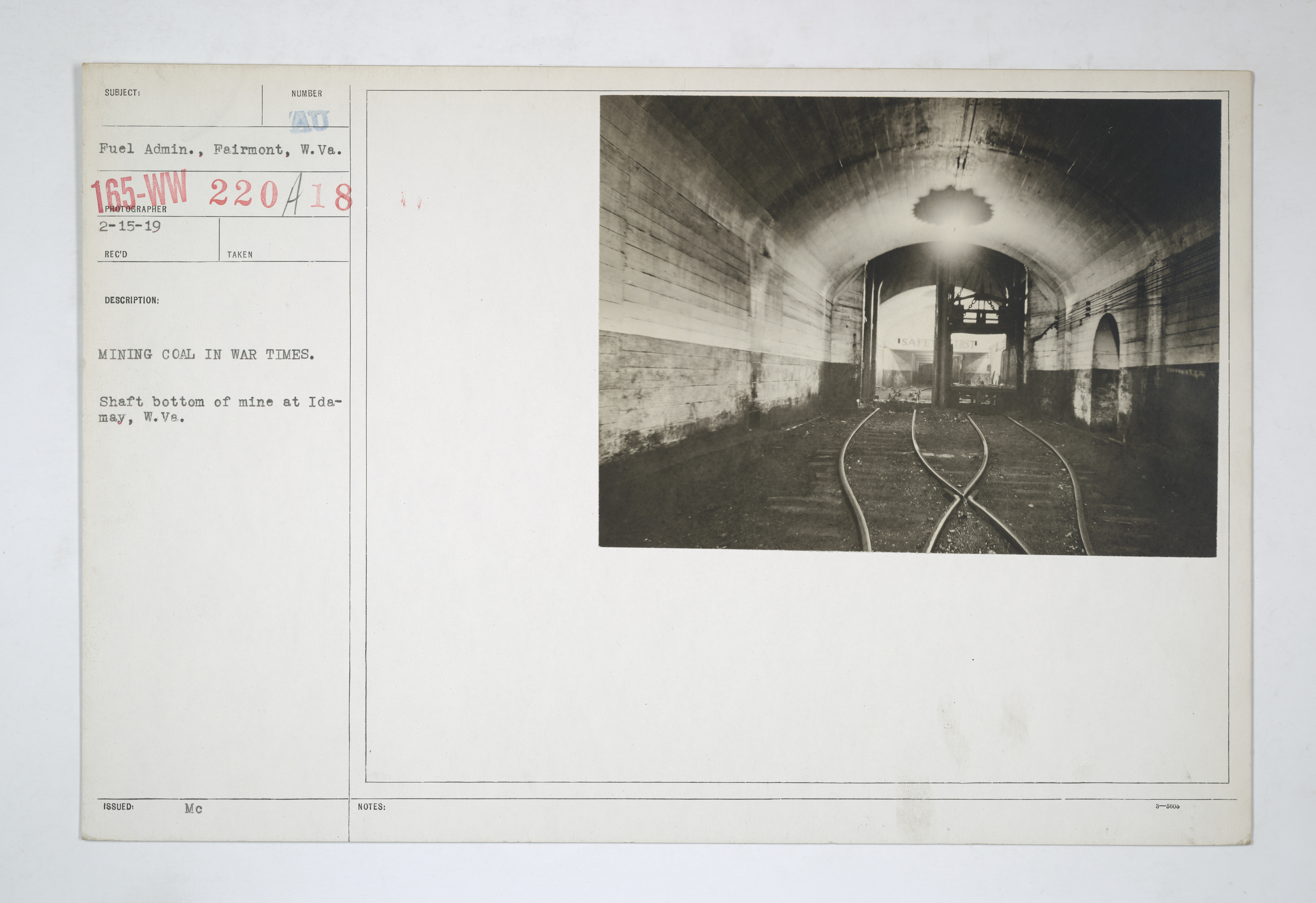

== See also ==
- List of census-designated places in West Virginia
