= Jacob Prickett Jr. Log House =

Historic house in West Virginia, United States

- U.S. National Register of Historic Places
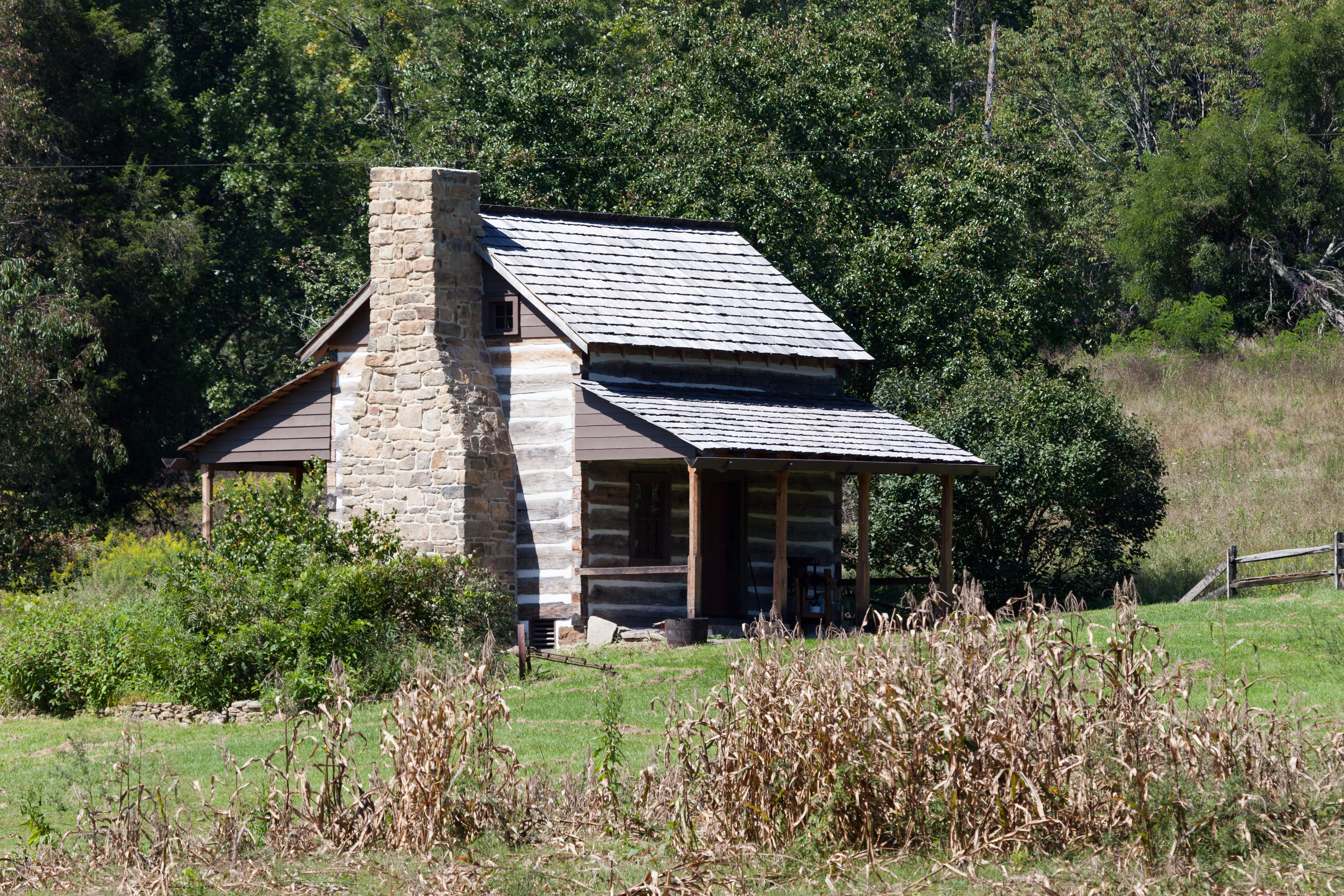

- Location within West Virginia Location within the United States
- Location: South of Montana off County Route 72, near Montana, West Virginia
- Coordinates: 39°31′6.69″N 80°6′1.09″W
- Area: 9.5 acres (3.8 ha)
- Built: 1781
- Built by: Jacob Prickett Jr.
- NRHP reference No.: 79002588
- Added to NRHP: April 20, 1979

Jacob Prickett Jr. Log House is a historic home located near Montana, Marion County, West Virginia. It was built in 1781, and is a two-story, rectangular log structure with a gable roof. It has a sandstone-walled cellar.

It was listed on the National Register of Historic Places in 1979.

== See also ==
- Prickett's Fort State Park
