= Pleasant View, West Virginia =

Pleasant View, West Virginia may refer to the following communities in West Virginia:

- Pleasant View, Jackson County, West Virginia
- Pleasant View, Lincoln County, West Virginia
- Pleasant View, Marion County, West Virginia
