= Hebron, West Virginia =

Hebron is the name of several unincorporated communities in the U.S. state of West Virginia.

- Hebron, Marion County, West Virginia
- Hebron, Pleasants County, West Virginia
