= Beverly Hills, West Virginia =

Beverly Hills is the name of two communities in the U.S. state of West Virginia.

- Beverly Hills, Huntington, West Virginia a neighborhood of Huntington, West Virginia
- Beverly Hills, Marion County, West Virginia
