= Bingamon, West Virginia =

Unincorporated community in West Virginia, US

Coordinates: 39°27′50″N 80°20′21″W

Bingamon is an unincorporated community in Marion County, in the U.S. state of West Virginia.

== History ==
A post office called Bingamon was established in 1854, and remained in operation until 1900. The community derives its name from one Mr. Bingaman, an early settler.
