= Meadowdale, West Virginia =

Meadowdale, West Virginia may refer to the following communities in West Virginia:

- Meadowdale, Jackson County, West Virginia
- Meadowdale, Marion County, West Virginia
