= Highland, Marion County, West Virginia =

Highland, West Virginia
- Unincorporated community
- Location within West Virginia Location within the United States
- Coordinates: 39°26′07″N 80°15′13″W
- Country: United States
- State: West Virginia
- County: Marion
- Elevation: 997 ft (304 m)
- Time zone: UTC-5 (Eastern (EST))
  - Summer (DST): UTC-4 (EDT)
- Area codes: 304 & 681
- GNIS feature ID: 1554711

Highland is an unincorporated community in Marion County, West Virginia, United States. Highland is located on the West Fork River, 1.25 miles (2.01 km) west of Worthington.
