= Viola, West Virginia =

Viola, West Virginia may refer to:

- Viola, Marion County, West Virginia, an unincorporated community
- Viola, Marshall County, West Virginia, an unincorporated community
