= Four States, West Virginia =

Unincorporated community in West Virginia, United States

- Unincorporated community
- Location within West Virginia Location within the United States
- Coordinates: 39°28′47″N 80°18′35″W
- Country: United States
- State: West Virginia
- County: Marion
- Elevation: 1,050 ft (320 m)
- Time zone: UTC-5 (Eastern (EST))
  - Summer (DST): UTC-4 (EDT)
- ZIP code: 26572
- Area codes: 304 & 681
- GNIS feature ID: 1554500

Four States is an unincorporated community in Marion County, West Virginia, United States. Four States is located along a railroad line northwest of Worthington. Four States has a post office with ZIP code 26572.

The community was named for the fact the proprietor owned mines in four U.S. states.
