= Big Run, West Virginia =

Big Run is the name of several unincorporated communities in the U.S. state of West Virginia.

- Big Run, Marion County, West Virginia
- Big Run, Marshall County, West Virginia
- Big Run, Webster County, West Virginia
- Big Run, Wetzel County, West Virginia
