= Baxter, Marion County, West Virginia =

Unincorporated community in West Virginia, United States

Baxter
- Unincorporated community
- Location within the state of West Virginia Baxter (the United States)
- Coordinates: 39°32′38″N 80°8′32″W
- Country: United States
- State: West Virginia
- County: Marion
- Time zone: UTC-5 (Eastern (EST))
  - Summer (DST): UTC-4 (EDT)
- GNIS feature ID: 1535314

Baxter is an unincorporated community in Marion County, West Virginia, United States. Baxter lies to the northwest of Rivesville along Paw Paw Creek.

The town was once the site of the Stafford Mine, one of the largest bituminous coal mines in Marion County, owned by the New Central Coal Company of New York.
