= Stringtown, Marion County, West Virginia =

Stringtown
- Unincorporated community
- Location within the state of West Virginia Stringtown (the United States)
- Coordinates: 39°28′55″N 80°21′8″W
- Country: United States
- State: West Virginia
- County: Marion
- Time zone: UTC-5 (Eastern (EST))
  - Summer (DST): UTC-4 (EDT)
- GNIS feature ID: 1555729

Stringtown is an unincorporated community in Marion County, West Virginia, United States.
