= Jordan, West Virginia =

- Unincorporated community
- Location within West Virginia Location within the United States
- Coordinates: 39°32′55″N 80°04′52″W
- Country: United States
- State: West Virginia
- County: Marion
- Elevation: 912 ft (278 m)
- Time zone: UTC-5 (Eastern (EST))
  - Summer (DST): UTC-4 (EDT)
- Area codes: 304 & 681
- GNIS feature ID: 1554832

Jordan is an unincorporated community in Marion County, West Virginia, United States. Jordan is located along the Monongahela River 5.5 miles (8.9 km) northeast of Fairmont.

The community most likely derives its name from one Mr. Jorgensen, a mining official.
