= 2012 United States presidential election in West Virginia =

- November 6, 2012
- Turnout: 55.0%

Nominee	Mitt Romney	Barack Obama
Party	Republican	Democratic
Home state	Massachusetts	Illinois
Running mate	Paul Ryan	Joe Biden
Electoral vote	5	0
Popular vote	417,655	238,269
Percentage	62.14%	35.45%

Romney
50–60%
60–70%
70–80%
80–90%
President before election
Barack Obama
Democratic
Elected President
Barack Obama
Democratic

The 2012 United States presidential election in West Virginia took place on November 6, 2012, as part of the 2012 United States presidential election in which all 50 states plus the District of Columbia participated. West Virginia voters chose five electors to represent them in the Electoral College via a popular vote pitting incumbent Democratic President Barack Obama and his running mate, Vice President Joe Biden, against Republican challenger and former Massachusetts Governor Mitt Romney and his running mate, Congressman Paul Ryan.

Mitt Romney defeated Barack Obama in the state of West Virginia by a landslide 26.69-point margin. The Republican ticket took 62.14% of the vote to the Democratic ticket's 35.45%, sweeping every county in the state. Romney became the first presidential candidate from any party since West Virginia's admission to the Union in 1863 to sweep every single county in the state and the first since Richard Nixon in 1972 to carry over 60% of the state's votes.

This represented a historic loss for the Democrats in West Virginia, which had been a Democratic stronghold from the New Deal up through the 1990s. Obama became the first Democrat since statehood to win the presidency without carrying Webster County, Jefferson County, or Braxton County. Obama is the only Democrat to ever win two terms without carrying the state at least once. However, Obama did win neighboring Virginia twice, becoming the first Democrat to win Virginia twice since Franklin D. Roosevelt in 1940 and 1944.

With 62.14% of the popular vote, West Virginia would prove to be Romney's fifth strongest state in the 2012 election after Utah, Wyoming, Oklahoma and Idaho. As of the 2024 presidential election, this is the last time the Democratic nominee has received more than 30% of the vote in West Virginia.

== Primary elections ==
=== Democratic primary ===
Barack Obama defeated Keith Judd, a convicted felon serving a federal prison sentence in Texarkana, TX, by a surprisingly narrow 59% to 41%.

West Virginia Democratic primary, 2012
- May 8, 2012

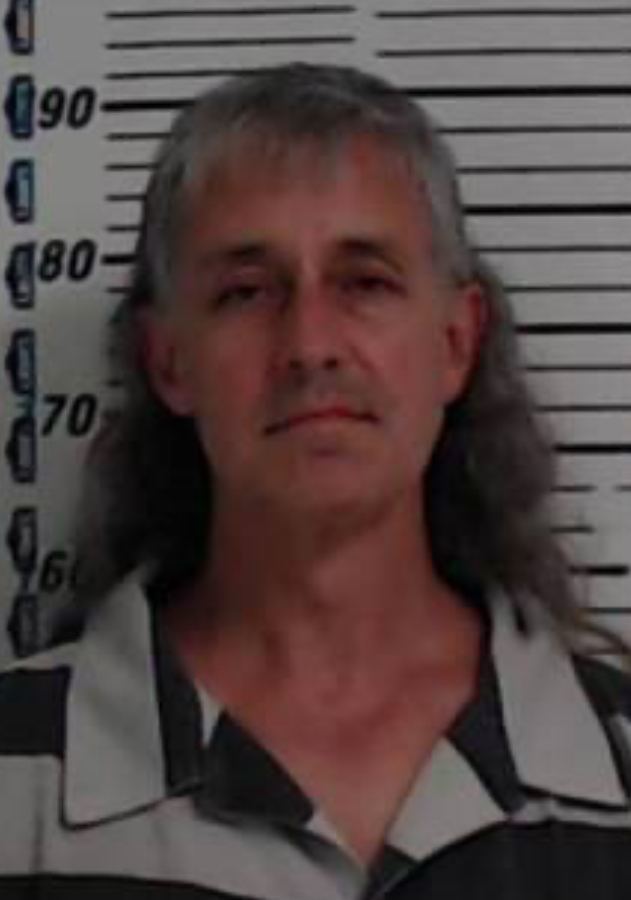
Candidate	Barack Obama	Keith Judd
Home state	Illinois	Texas
Delegate count	24	0
Popular vote	106,770	73,138
Percentage	59.35%	40.65%
- West Virginia results by county Barack Obama Keith Judd

=== Republican primary ===
West Virginia Republican primary, 2012
- May 8, 2012

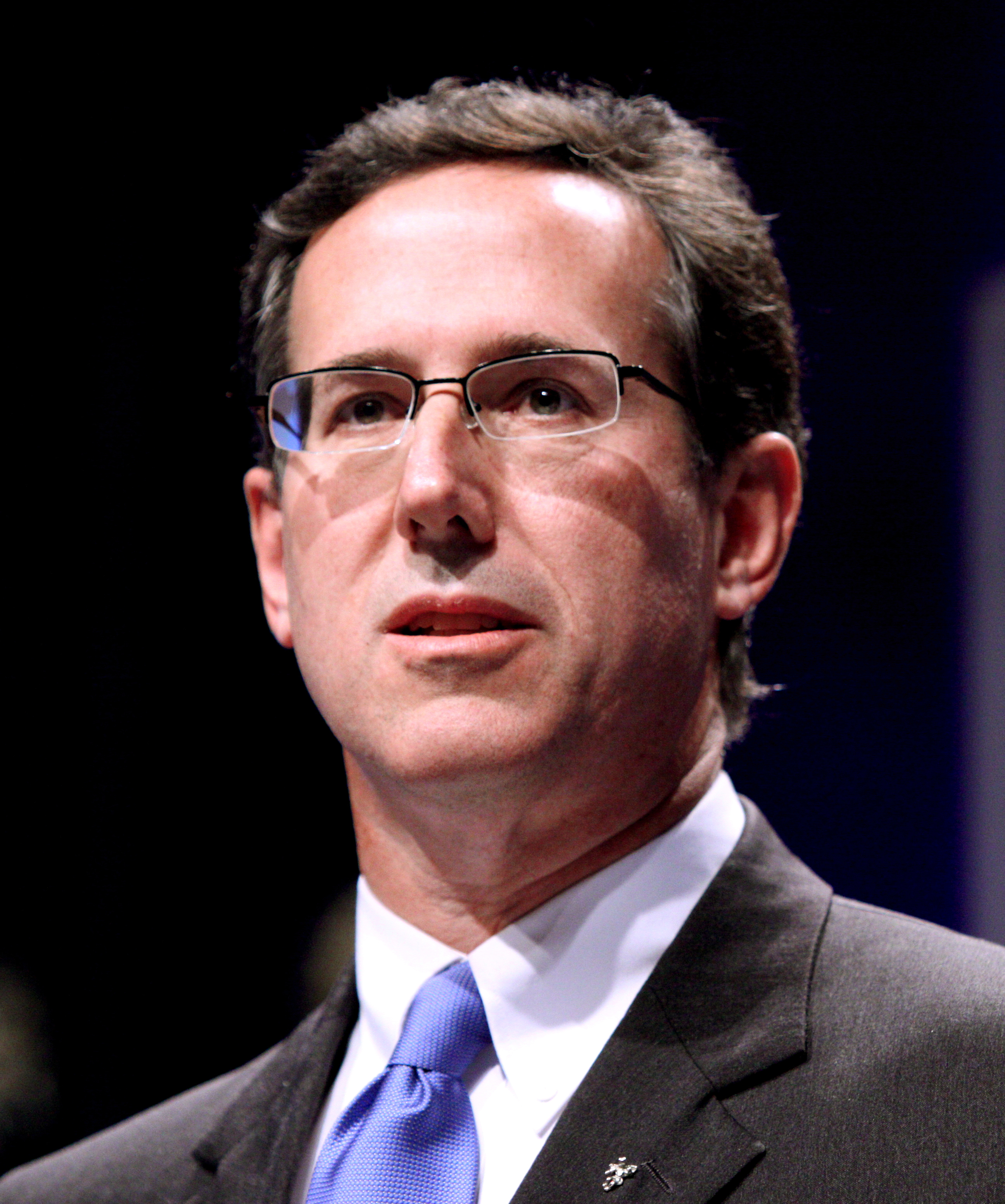

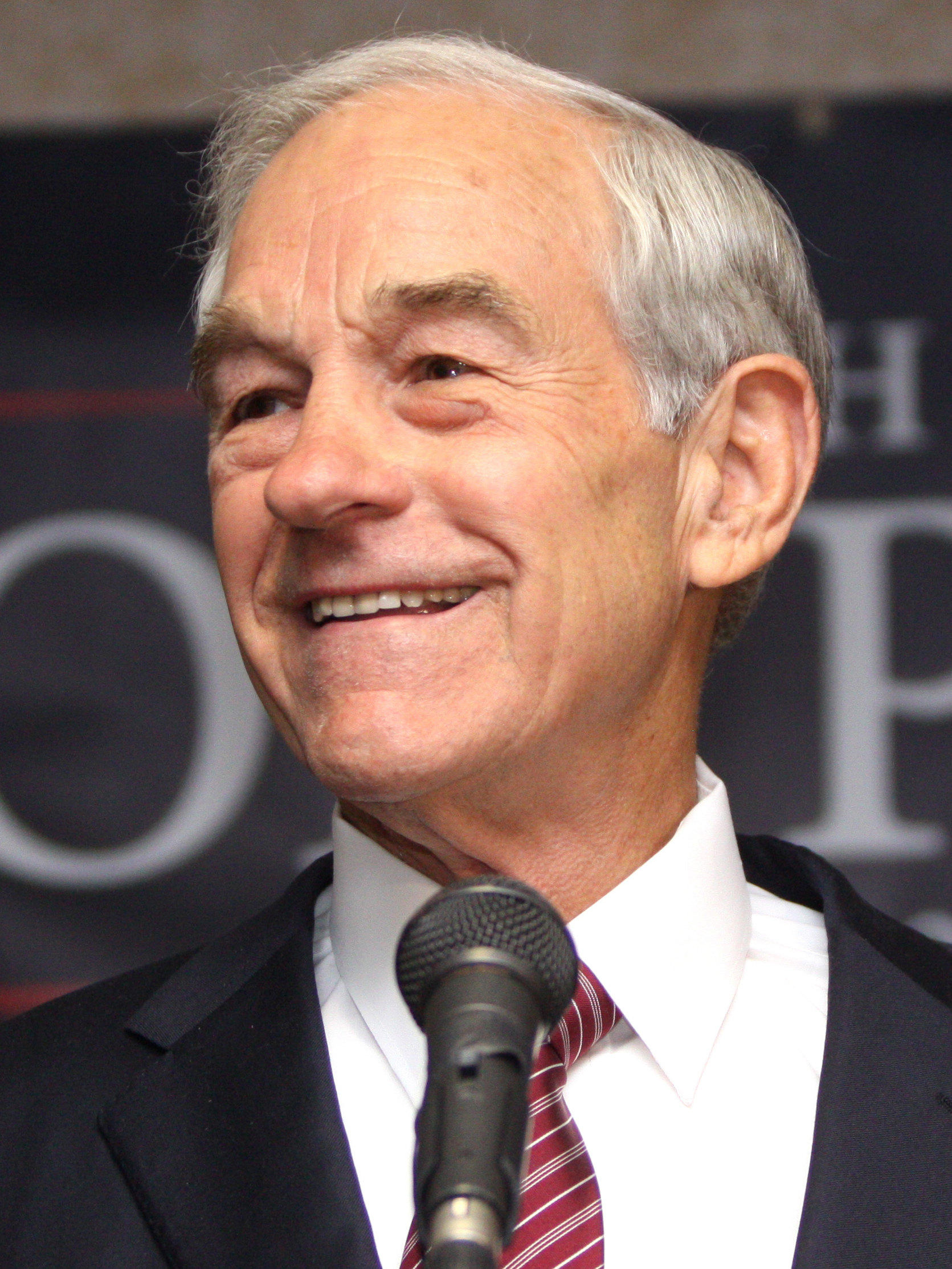

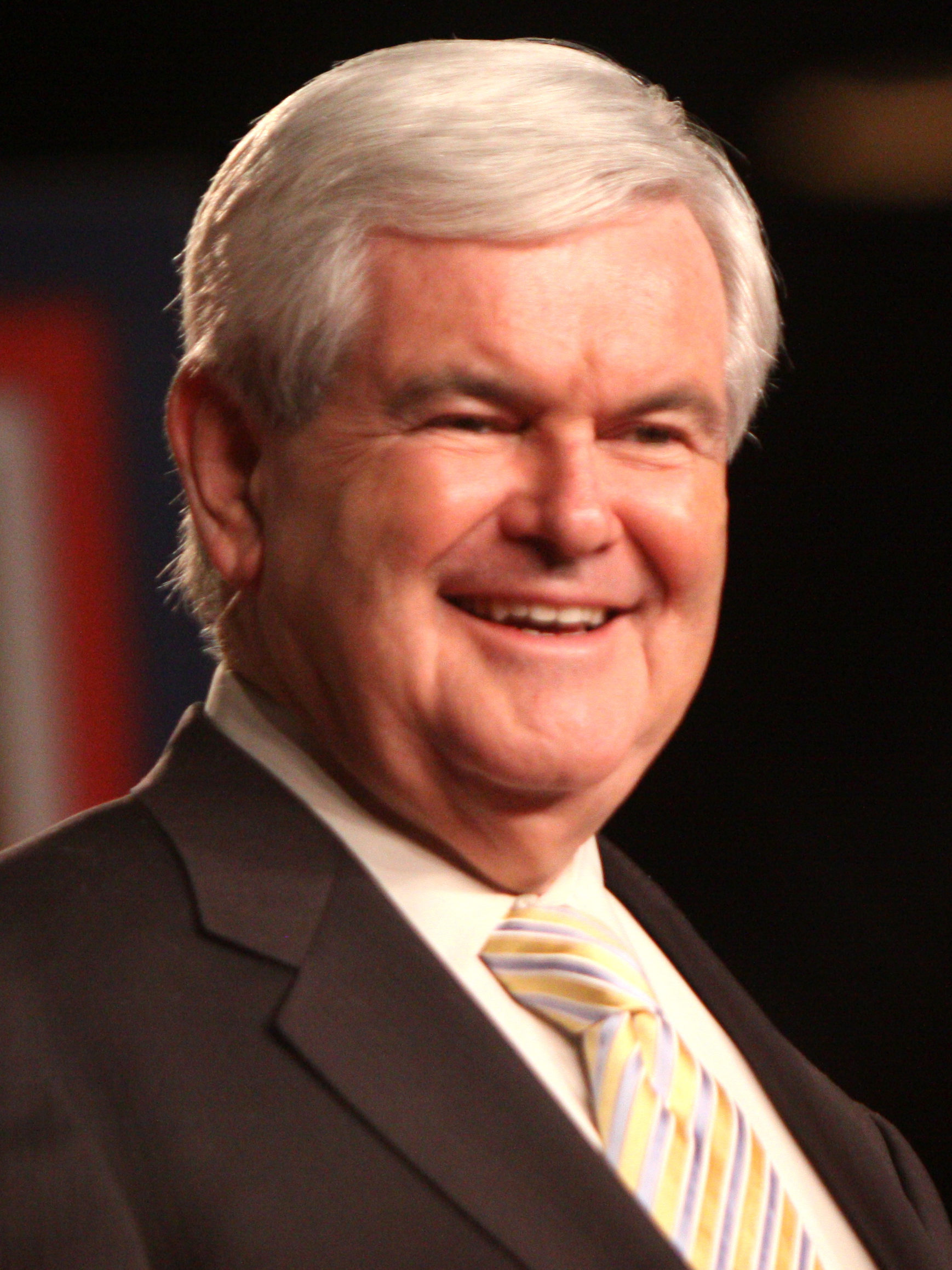
Candidate	Mitt Romney	Rick Santorum
Home state	Massachusetts	Pennsylvania
Delegate count	24	2
Popular vote	78,197	13,590
Percentage	69.56%	12.09%
Candidate	Ron Paul	Newt Gingrich
Home state	Texas	Georgia
Delegate count	0	0
Popular vote	12,412	7,076
Percentage	11.04%	6.29%
- West Virginia results by county Mitt Romney (Note: Italicization indicates a withdrawn candidacy)

The Republican primary took place on May 8, 2012.

==== Results ====
West Virginia Republican primary, 2012
Candidate	Votes	Percentage	Projected delegate count	
Candidate	Votes	Percentage	CNN	GP
Mitt Romney	78,197	69.56%		24
Rick Santorum (withdrawn)	13,590	12.09%		2
Ron Paul	12,412	11.04%		0
Newt Gingrich (withdrawn)	7,076	6.29%		0
Buddy Roemer (withdrawn)	1,141	1.01%		0
Unprojected delegates			31	5
Total:	112,416	100%	31	31

==== Results by county ====
County	Mitt Romney	Ron Paul	Rick Santorum (withdrawn)	Newt Gingrich (withdrawn)	Buddy Roemer (withdrawn)
Barbour	66.96% (983)	9.20% (135)	15.94% (234)	7.49% (110)	0.41% (6)
Berkeley	69.31% (4366)	14.92% (940)	10.29% (648)	4.84% (305)	0.64% (40)
Boone	70.28% (454)	10.68% (69)	14.55% (94)	3.41% (22)	1.08% (7)
Braxton	68.44% (399)	13.89% (81)	12.35% (72)	4.12% (24)	1.20% (7)
Brooke	69.46% (778)	10.36% (116)	15.09% (169)	4.64% (52)	0.45% (5)
Cabell	69.09% (3351)	12.60% (611)	11.34% (550)	5.77% (280)	1.20% (58)
Calhoun	66.78% (191)	11.89% (34)	12.24% (35)	5.59% (16)	3.50% (10)
Clay	67.01% (262)	10.49% (41)	13.30% (52)	7.42% (29)	1.79% (7)
Doddridge	67.36% (997)	10.61% (157)	12.23% (181)	8.31% (123)	1.49% (22)
Fayette	66.54% (891)	12.02% (161)	12.70% (170)	7.17% (96)	1.57% (21)
Gilmer	70.44% (255)	7.73% (28)	11.05% (40)	9.94% (36)	0.83% (3)
Grant	78.16% (1403)	6.07% (109)	8.30% (149)	6.35% (114)	1.11% (20)
Greenbrier	68.13% (1366)	11.12% (223)	13.12% (263)	6.43% (129)	1.20% (24)
Hampshire	72.70% (1270)	8.59% (150)	12.08% (211)	5.72% (100)	0.92% (16)
Hancock	70.04% (1302)	11.62% (216)	13.07% (243)	3.98% (74)	1.29% (24)
Hardy	69.75% (611)	8.22% (72)	13.93% (122)	6.62% (58)	1.48% (13)
Harrison	67.88% (2715)	10.95% (438)	12.03% (481)	8.25% (330)	0.90% (36)
Jackson	65.87% (2030)	11.36% (350)	13.98% (431)	7.66% (236)	1.14% (35)
Jefferson	67.98% (1771)	16.08% (419)	10.13% (264)	4.99% (130)	0.81% (21)
Kanawha	71.73% (7295)	11.62% (1182)	10.55% (1073)	5.18% (527)	0.91% (93)
Lewis	73.98% (1288)	7.41% (129)	10.17% (177)	7.35% (128)	1.09% (19)
Lincoln	71.69% (504)	8.53% (60)	10.38% (73)	7.54% (53)	1.85% (13)
Logan	67.71% (388)	9.77% (56)	15.01% (86)	6.46% (37)	1.05% (6)
Marion	64.57% (1775)	11.13% (306)	15.61% (429)	6.91% (190)	1.78% (49)
Marshall	71.67% (1687)	8.54% (201)	13.04% (307)	5.82% (137)	0.93% (22)
Mason	66.04% (1641)	11.11% (276)	13.48% (335)	7.69% (191)	1.69% (42)
McDowell	62.81% (152)	12.81% (31)	15.70% (38)	8.26% (20)	0.41% (1)
Mercer	72.24% (1884)	8.51% (222)	12.08% (315)	6.40% (167)	0.77% (20)
Mineral	70.54% (1722)	10.00% (244)	12.04% (294)	6.72% (164)	0.70% (17)
Mingo	69.21% (272)	7.63% (30)	12.21% (48)	8.91% (35)	2.04% (8)
Monongalia	66.40% (2826)	14.14% (602)	11.63% (495)	6.72% (286)	1.10% (47)
Monroe	65.27% (671)	12.55% (129)	12.16% (125)	8.46% (87)	1.56% (16)
Morgan	68.77% (1240)	13.09% (236)	11.09% (200)	5.60% (101)	1.44% (26)
Nicholas	69.78% (875)	9.81% (123)	12.28% (154)	7.10% (89)	1.04% (13)
Ohio	76.43% (2775)	8.84% (321)	10.52% (382)	3.58% (130)	0.63% (23)
Pendleton	75.64% (354)	7.26% (34)	11.54% (54)	4.70% (22)	0.85% (4)
Pleasants	66.26% (381)	10.78% (62)	16.70% (96)	5.57% (32)	0.70% (4)
Pocahontas	63.05% (558)	14.01% (124)	13.56% (120)	8.47% (75)	0.90% (8)
Preston	66.95% (2032)	10.48% (318)	15.32% (465)	6.39% (194)	0.86% (26)
Putnam	70.34% (3891)	11.26% (623)	12.26% (678)	5.28% (292)	0.87% (48)
Raleigh	73.23% (2992)	7.73% (316)	11.75% (480)	6.78% (277)	0.51% (21)
Randolph	68.43% (969)	9.25% (131)	13.14% (186)	7.84% (111)	1.34% (19)
Ritchie	65.27% (1000)	13.97% (214)	12.01% (184)	7.18% (110)	1.57% (24)
Roane	69.95% (866)	9.94% (123)	11.31% (140)	7.43% (92)	1.37% (17)
Summers	67.24% (388)	10.40% (60)	11.96% (69)	9.01% (52)	1.39% (8)
Taylor	67.82% (784)	11.76% (136)	12.63% (146)	7.44% (86)	0.35% (4)
Tucker	69.29% (422)	11.33% (69)	9.85% (60)	9.03% (55)	0.49% (3)
Tyler	68.46% (675)	11.76% (116)	11.97% (118)	6.39% (63)	1.42% (14)
Upshur	69.12% (2344)	9.20% (312)	13.65% (463)	6.69% (227)	1.33% (45)
Wayne	66.79% (1076)	10.12% (163)	14.65% (236)	7.76% (125)	0.68% (11)
Webster	64.65% (139)	10.70% (23)	15.35% (33)	6.98% (15)	2.33% (5)
Wetzel	69.53% (566)	8.35% (68)	16.46% (134)	5.28% (43)	0.37% (3)
Wirt	63.00% (332)	11.57% (61)	16.32% (86)	8.92% (47)	0.19% (1)
Wood	70.20% (5422)	11.64% (899)	10.72% (828)	6.42% (496)	1.02% (79)
Wyoming	75.58% (616)	7.61% (62)	9.08% (74)	6.87% (56)	0.86% (7)

== General election ==
=== Predictions ===
Source	Ranking	As of
Huffington Post	Safe R	November 6, 2012
CNN	Safe R	November 6, 2012
New York Times	Safe R	November 6, 2012
Washington Post	Safe R	November 6, 2012
RealClearPolitics	Solid R	November 6, 2012
Sabato's Crystal Ball	Solid R	November 5, 2012
FiveThirtyEight	Solid R	November 6, 2012

=== Results ===
2012 United States presidential election in West Virginia
Party	Candidate	Running mate	Popular vote		Electoral vote		Swing
Party	Candidate	Running mate	Count	%	Count	%	Swing
Republican	Mitt Romney of Massachusetts	Paul Ryan of Wisconsin	417,655	62.14%	5	100.00%	▲6.70%
Democratic	Barack Obama of Illinois (incumbent)	Joe Biden of Delaware (incumbent)	238,269	35.45%	0	0.00%	▼6.97%
Libertarian	Gary Johnson of New Mexico	James P. Gray of California	6,302	0.94%	0	0.00%	▲0.94%
Mountain	Jill Stein of Massachusetts	Cheri Honkala of Pennsylvania	4,406	0.66%	0	0.00%	▲0.33%
Independent	Randall Terry of West Virginia	N/A of N/A	3,806	0.57%	0	0.00%	▲0.57%
Write-in	Various of Various	Various of Various	1,502	0.22%	0	0.00%	▼0.03%
Constitution	Virgil Goode (write-in) of Virginia	Jim Clymer of Pennsylvania	119	0.02%	0	0.00%	▼0.32%
Peace and Freedom	Roseanne Barr (write-in) of Hawaii	Cindy Sheehan of California	31	0.00%	0	0.00%	Steady
Justice	Rocky Anderson (write-in) of Utah	Luis J. Rodriguez of California	12	0.00%	0	0.00%	Steady
American Third Position	Merlin Miller (write-in) of Iowa	Virginia Abernethy of Arizona	12	0.00%	0	0.00%	Steady
American Independent	Tom Hoefling (write-in) of Iowa	Robert Ornelas of California	5	0.00%	0	0.00%	Steady
Independent	Richard Duncan (write-in) of -	of -	1	0.00%	0	0.00%	Steady
Total			672,119	100.00%	5	100.00%	

==== By county ====
County	Mitt Romney Republican		Barack Obama Democratic		Various candidates Other parties		Margin		Total
County	#	%	#	%	#	%	#	%	Total
Barbour	3,824	66.19%	1,768	30.60%	185	3.21%	2,056	35.59%	5,777
Berkeley	22,156	59.39%	14,275	38.26%	876	2.35%	7,881	21.13%	37,307
Boone	5,467	64.30%	2,790	32.82%	245	2.88%	2,677	31.48%	8,502
Braxton	2,725	56.65%	1,998	41.54%	87	1.81%	727	15.11%	4,810
Brooke	5,060	54.25%	4,005	42.94%	263	2.81%	1,055	11.31%	9,328
Cabell	17,985	55.93%	13,568	42.19%	605	1.88%	4,417	13.74%	32,158
Calhoun	1,319	59.68%	818	37.01%	73	3.31%	501	22.67%	2,210
Clay	1,971	65.31%	931	30.85%	116	3.84%	1,040	34.46%	3,018
Doddridge	2,130	76.78%	575	20.73%	69	2.49%	1,555	56.05%	2,774
Fayette	8,350	59.35%	5,419	38.51%	301	2.14%	2,931	20.84%	14,070
Gilmer	1,595	63.24%	840	33.31%	87	3.45%	755	29.93%	2,522
Grant	3,783	82.45%	718	15.65%	87	1.90%	3,065	66.80%	4,588
Greenbrier	7,930	60.98%	4,710	36.22%	365	2.80%	3,220	24.76%	13,005
Hampshire	5,523	68.87%	2,299	28.67%	197	2.46%	3,224	40.20%	8,019
Hancock	7,226	59.47%	4,627	38.08%	297	2.45%	2,599	21.39%	12,150
Hardy	3,536	68.25%	1,482	28.60%	163	3.15%	2,054	39.65%	5,181
Harrison	15,876	60.43%	9,732	37.04%	663	2.53%	6,144	23.39%	26,271
Jackson	7,408	63.90%	3,854	33.24%	332	2.86%	3,554	30.66%	11,594
Jefferson	11,258	50.63%	10,398	46.76%	580	2.61%	860	3.87%	22,236
Kanawha	41,364	54.92%	32,480	43.13%	1,468	1.95%	8,884	11.79%	75,312
Lewis	4,375	69.51%	1,736	27.58%	183	2.91%	2,639	41.93%	6,294
Lincoln	4,383	64.29%	2,227	32.66%	208	3.05%	2,156	31.63%	6,818
Logan	8,222	68.68%	3,469	28.98%	281	2.34%	4,753	39.70%	11,972
Marion	12,054	55.93%	8,959	41.57%	540	2.50%	3,095	14.36%	21,553
Marshall	8,135	62.77%	4,484	34.60%	341	2.63%	3,651	28.17%	12,960
Mason	5,741	58.64%	3,778	38.59%	271	2.77%	1,963	20.05%	9,790
McDowell	3,959	63.98%	2,109	34.08%	120	1.94%	1,850	29.90%	6,188
Mercer	15,450	72.49%	5,432	25.49%	431	2.02%	10,018	47.00%	21,313
Mineral	7,833	71.29%	2,885	26.26%	270	2.45%	4,948	45.03%	10,988
Mingo	6,191	69.92%	2,428	27.42%	236	2.66%	3,763	42.50%	8,855
Monongalia	16,831	53.28%	13,826	43.77%	934	2.95%	3,005	9.51%	31,591
Monroe	3,616	69.11%	1,455	27.81%	161	3.08%	2,161	41.30%	5,232
Morgan	4,513	63.82%	2,363	33.42%	195	2.76%	2,150	30.40%	7,071
Nicholas	5,898	67.09%	2,664	30.30%	229	2.61%	3,234	36.79%	8,791
Ohio	10,768	59.96%	6,786	37.79%	405	2.25%	3,982	22.17%	17,959
Pendleton	2,095	64.34%	1,074	32.99%	87	2.67%	1,021	31.35%	3,256
Pleasants	1,825	64.24%	955	33.61%	61	2.15%	870	30.63%	2,841
Pocahontas	2,182	60.76%	1,303	36.29%	106	2.95%	879	24.47%	3,591
Preston	7,889	70.54%	2,931	26.21%	363	3.25%	4,958	44.33%	11,183
Putnam	16,032	67.47%	7,256	30.54%	472	1.99%	8,776	36.93%	23,760
Raleigh	20,614	71.48%	7,739	26.84%	484	1.68%	12,875	44.64%	28,837
Randolph	6,160	63.00%	3,342	34.18%	276	2.82%	2,818	28.82%	9,778
Ritchie	2,921	77.07%	768	20.26%	101	2.67%	2,153	56.81%	3,790
Roane	2,982	58.93%	1,939	38.32%	139	2.75%	1,043	20.61%	5,060
Summers	2,981	62.84%	1,621	34.17%	142	2.99%	1,360	28.67%	4,744
Taylor	3,840	64.85%	1,941	32.78%	140	2.37%	1,899	32.07%	5,921
Tucker	2,176	69.34%	880	28.04%	82	2.62%	1,296	41.30%	3,138
Tyler	2,314	70.44%	890	27.09%	81	2.47%	1,424	43.35%	3,285
Upshur	5,939	71.57%	2,158	26.01%	201	2.42%	3,781	45.56%	8,298
Wayne	8,688	62.02%	4,931	35.20%	390	2.78%	3,757	26.82%	14,009
Webster	1,710	61.67%	947	34.15%	116	4.18%	763	27.52%	2,773
Wetzel	3,473	59.11%	2,217	37.74%	185	3.15%	1,256	21.37%	5,875
Wirt	1,427	65.73%	676	31.14%	68	3.13%	751	34.59%	2,171
Wood	22,183	65.10%	11,230	32.96%	663	1.94%	10,953	32.14%	34,076
Wyoming	5,769	76.65%	1,583	21.03%	174	2.32%	4,186	55.62%	7,526
Totals	417,655	62.14%	238,269	35.45%	16,195	2.41%	179,386	26.69%	672,119

Counties that flipped from Democratic to Republican

- Boone (largest city: Madison)
- Braxton (largest town: Sutton)
- Jefferson (largest city: Charles Town)
- Marion (largest city: Fairmont)
- McDowell (largest city: Welch)
- Monongalia (largest city: Morgantown)
- Webster (largest town: Webster Springs)

==== By congressional district ====
Romney won all three congressional districts, including one held by a Democrat.

District	Romney	Obama	Representative
1st	62.18%	35.54%	David McKinley
2nd	60%	37.97%	Shelley Moore Capito
3rd	65%	32.79%	Nick Rahall

== See also ==
- 2012 Republican Party presidential debates
- 2012 Republican Party presidential primaries
- Results of the 2012 Republican Party presidential primaries
- West Virginia Republican Party
