= Katy, West Virginia =

Katy
- Unincorporated community
- Location within the state of West Virginia Katy (the United States)
- Coordinates: 39°30′39″N 80°13′27″W
- Country: United States
- State: West Virginia
- County: Marion
- Elevation: 958 ft (292 m)
- Time zone: UTC-5 (Eastern (EST))
  - Summer (DST): UTC-4 (EDT)
- GNIS ID: 1554848

Katy is an unincorporated community in Marion County, West Virginia, United States. Its post office is closed.
