= Flyblow, West Virginia =

Unincorporated community in West Virginia, United States

Flyblow
- Unincorporated community
- Location within the state of West Virginia Flyblow (the United States)
- Coordinates: 39°36′41″N 80°18′49″W
- Country: United States
- State: West Virginia
- County: Marion
- Elevation: 1,430 ft (440 m)
- Time zone: UTC-5 (Eastern (EST))
  - Summer (DST): UTC-4 (EDT)
- GNIS ID: 1717947

Flyblow was an unincorporated community in Marion County, West Virginia, United States.
