= Rachel, West Virginia =

- Census-designated place (CDP)
- Location in Marion County and the state of West Virginia
- Coordinates: 39°31′06″N 80°18′13″W
- Country: United States
- State: West Virginia
- County: Marion

Area
  - Total: 0.346 sq mi (0.90 km^{2})
  - Land: 0.342 sq mi (0.89 km^{2})
  - Water: 0.004 sq mi (0.010 km^{2})
- Elevation: 958 ft (292 m)

Population (2020)
  - Total: 224
  - Density: 655/sq mi (253/km^{2})
- Time zone: UTC-5 (Eastern (EST))
  - Summer (DST): UTC-4 (EDT)
- ZIP code: 26587
- Area codes: 304 & 681
- GNIS feature ID: 1555431

Rachel is a census-designated place (CDP) in Marion County, West Virginia, United States. It is located along Buffalo Creek, 2 miles (3.2 km) east-southeast of Mannington. Rachel has a post office with ZIP code 26587. As of the 2020 census, its population was 224 (down from 248 at the 2010 census). Rachel is located on U.S. 250 between Farmington and Mannington.

== History ==
During the late 1800s through early 1900s, the area was known as Broomfield. The area was also called Downs in the early 1900s after the Downs Pump Station, operated by the Eureka Pipe Line Company. By the mid-1920s the area became known as Rachel after the daughter of John H. Jones, an official at the local mine.

The town of Rachel grew around its rich oil, gas, and coal reserves. The Eureka Pipe Line Company operated several petroleum trunk lines at the Downs Pump Station. The pump station operated from the early 1900s through the 1940s and included a 12,000 barrel oil tank and two 250 horsepower water tube cross drum type boilers. In 1909 the Fairmont and Mannington Railway was completed with stops at Barrackville, Farmington, and Downs. The first trolley, Car No. 100, stopped at Downs on Wednesday, March 24, 1909, to great fanfare. Riders celebrated at Eureka Park, a large park located on the banks of Buffalo Creek across from the mine entrance, which hosted picnics, dances, vaudeville acts, reunions, concerts, and athletic events. The park was owned by Harry C. Anderson, who later sold the park to U. S. VanZandt in March 1922.

The shaft mine opened in 1917 by the Consumers Coal Company. The area was well suited for mining with direct access to the B&O Railroad and a street car line to Mannington and Fairmont. When the mine opened, many considered it one of the most modern in the state. The mine produced a hefty 301,060 tons of coal in 1921, and in 1923 the operator's name changed to the Bertha-Consumers Coal Co. Bertha-Consumers mined coal at Rachel until 1926. From 1936 until 1944 Rachel was run by Jones Collieries, Inc. Rachel Mine was later a captive mine for Sharon Steel of Pennsylvania, and the coal was coked in by-product coke ovens in Fairmont. Rachel is probably where the Fairmont Coalfield reserves begin morphing from metallurgical to thermal coal. In the 1960s the mine was operated by Joanne Coal Company, a wholly owned subsidiary of Sharon Steel Corp, and was known as Joanne Mine No 59. The mine operated in three shifts and employed 265 employees. In 1969 the mine was acquired by Eastern Associated Coal Corp.

When the mine opened, Consumers Coal Company constructed a miners' camp on a hill above Rachel to house the workers and their families. The camp included a clubhouse, which had separate divisions for English and American workmen, and a section for foreign employees, many of whom emigrated from Poland, Austria, Czechoslovakia, Russia, and Italy. The features of the camp were described as follows: “The houses are above the mine in a most beautiful place and each house is single, located on a lot of 100 feet square. Lots are plowed free of charge to encourage gardening, pasture is furnished for one cow and a stable has been erected on each lot.”

Based on the growth in population, the infrastructure of the area was developed. A two-story schoolhouse was located near the entrance of the mine facility, which served students until 1925 when Downs Elementary School was opened to consolidate the small rural schools of Mod's Run, Upper and Lower Plum Run, and East Run. Pollock's General Store was opened on April 2, 1952, and Graham's Garage was opened in 1917.

After the Rachel mine closed in 1985, much of the local infrastructure diminished. Graham's Garage closed in the 1980s. Downs Elementary School closed in 1991 when students were transferred to the newly constructed Blackshere Elementary School. The local community center was closed in the 1990s. The last remnant of this once thriving community is the local post office.
