= Seven Pines, West Virginia =

Seven Pines
- Unincorporated community
- Location within the state of West Virginia Seven Pines (the United States)
- Coordinates: 39°34′00″N 80°26′30″W
- Country: United States
- State: West Virginia
- County: Marion
- Elevation: 1,063 ft (324 m)
- Time zone: UTC-5 (Eastern (EST))
  - Summer (DST): UTC-4 (EDT)
- GNIS ID: 1549921

Seven Pines is an unincorporated community in Marion County, West Virginia, United States. Its post office is closed.
