= Pleasant View, Marion County, West Virginia =

Pleasant View, West Virginia
- Unincorporated community
- Location within West Virginia Location within the United States
- Coordinates: 39°32′56″N 80°07′14″W
- Country: United States
- State: West Virginia
- County: Marion
- Elevation: 1,024 ft (312 m)
- Time zone: UTC-5 (Eastern (EST))
  - Summer (DST): UTC-4 (EDT)
- Area codes: 304 & 681
- GNIS feature ID: 1555372

Pleasant View is an unincorporated community in Marion County, West Virginia, United States. Pleasant View is located along U.S. Route 19, 1.3 miles (2.1 km) north of Rivesville.
