= Catawba, West Virginia =

Unincorporated community in West Virginia, United States

Catawba
- Unincorporated community
- Location within the state of West Virginia Catawba (the United States)
- Coordinates: 39°13′37″N 80°4′40″W
- Country: United States
- State: West Virginia
- County: Marion
- Elevation: 876 ft (267 m)
- Time zone: UTC-5 (Eastern (EST))
  - Summer (DST): UTC-4 (EDT)
- ZIP codes: 26564
- GNIS ID: 1554087

Catawba is an unincorporated community in Marion County, West Virginia, United States.

The community's name commemorates the Catawba people.
