= Montana Mines, West Virginia =

Montana Mines
- Unincorporated community
- Location within the state of West Virginia Montana Mines (the United States)
- Coordinates: 39°31′37″N 80°6′32″W
- Country: United States
- State: West Virginia
- County: Marion
- Elevation: 994 ft (303 m)
- Time zone: UTC-5 (Eastern (EST))
  - Summer (DST): UTC-4 (EDT)
- ZIP codes: 26586
- FIPS code: 1549700

Montana Mines is an unincorporated community located in Marion County, West Virginia, United States. It is part of Marion County in Fairmont.

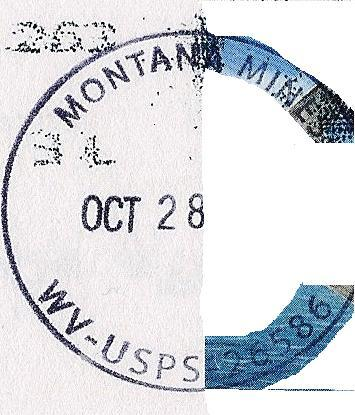
