= Boothsville, West Virginia =

Unincorporated community in West Virginia, United States

Boothsville
- Unincorporated community
- Location within the state of West Virginia Boothsville (the United States)
- Coordinates: 39°23′41″N 80°11′42″W
- Country: United States
- State: West Virginia
- County: Marion
- Elevation: 961 ft (293 m)
- Time zone: UTC-5 (Eastern (EST))
  - Summer (DST): UTC-4 (EDT)
- GNIS feature ID: 1553950

Boothsville is an unincorporated community in Marion County, West Virginia, United States. Its post office is closed.

The community derives its name from Captain James Booth, an early settler.
