= Paw Paw, Marion County, West Virginia =

Paw Paw
- Unincorporated community
- Location within the state of West Virginia Paw Paw (the United States)
- Coordinates: 39°32′55″N 80°9′11″W
- Country: United States
- State: West Virginia
- County: Marion
- Elevation: 902 ft (275 m)
- Time zone: UTC-5 (Eastern (EST))
  - Summer (DST): UTC-4 (EDT)
- GNIS ID: 1555317

Paw Paw is an unincorporated community in Marion County, West Virginia, United States.
