= Hutchinson, Marion County, West Virginia =

Hutchinson
- Unincorporated community
- Location within the state of West Virginia Hutchinson (the United States)
- Coordinates: 39°26′26″N 80°16′26″W
- Country: United States
- State: West Virginia
- County: Marion
- Elevation: 958 ft (292 m)
- Time zone: UTC-5 (Eastern (EST))
  - Summer (DST): UTC-4 (EDT)
- GNIS ID: 1554761

Hutchinson is an unincorporated community in Marion County, West Virginia, United States.
