= Shagtown, West Virginia =

Shagtown
- Unincorporated community
- Location within the state of West Virginia Shagtown (the United States)
- Coordinates: 39°29′30″N 80°7′46″W
- Country: United States
- State: West Virginia
- County: Marion
- Elevation: 1,004 ft (306 m)
- Time zone: UTC-5 (Eastern (EST))
  - Summer (DST): UTC-4 (EDT)
- GNIS ID: 1718196

Shagtown was an unincorporated community in Marion County, West Virginia, United States. Shagtown was first referenced in a 1913 West Virginia Geological Survey. It was later annexed by the neighboring municipality and was marked as "Ward 3" according to a 1919 map published by the City of Fairmont.

Today, the area exists as a predominantly African American neighborhood and is commonly referred to as Jackson Addition in modern maps maintained by the city's government.
