= Wahoo, West Virginia =

Wahoo
- Unincorporated community
- Location within the state of West Virginia Wahoo (the United States)
- Coordinates: 39°27′18″N 80°13′36″W
- Country: United States
- State: West Virginia
- County: Marion
- Elevation: 892 ft (272 m)
- Time zone: UTC-5 (Eastern (EST))
  - Summer (DST): UTC-4 (EDT)
- GNIS ID: 1555903

Wahoo is an unincorporated community in Marion County, West Virginia, United States. The community is situated on the western banks of the West Fork River adjacent to the town of Monongah.

The exact boundaries of Wahoo are not precisely recognized but they generally include the Traction Park neighborhood of Monongah, the adjacent unincorporated area along the West Fork River, and portions of the adjacent unincorporated Thoburn community.

Wahoo is within the North Marion High School attendance area, with Fairmont State University and West Virginia University nearby.
