= Metz, West Virginia =

- Unincorporated community
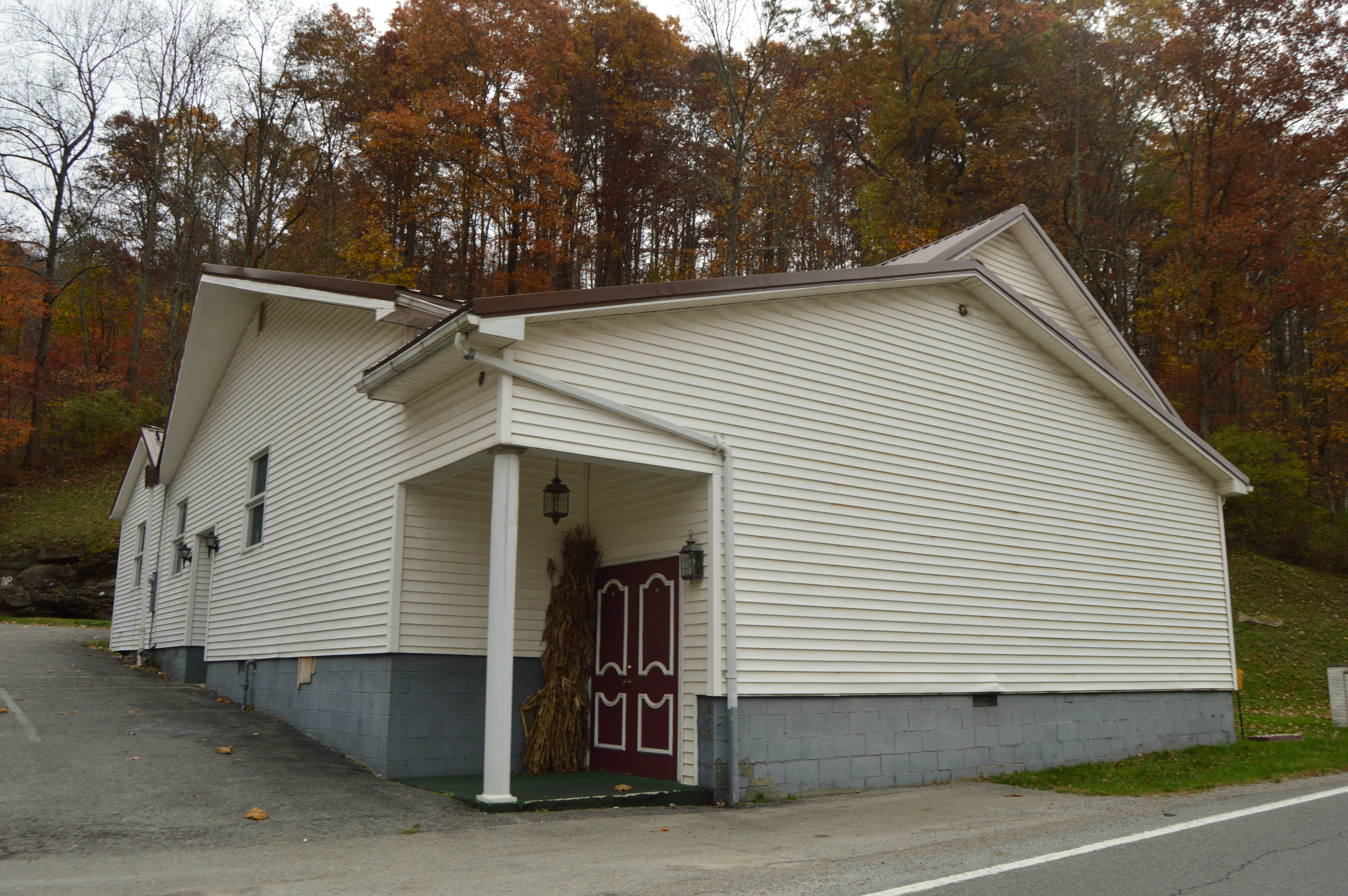
- Metz Church of God of Prophecy

- Location within West Virginia Location within the United States
- Coordinates: 39°34′49″N 80°22′11″W
- Country: United States
- State: West Virginia
- County: Marion
- Elevation: 1,001 ft (305 m)
- Time zone: UTC-5 (Eastern (EST))
  - Summer (DST): UTC-4 (EDT)
- ZIP code: 26585
- Area codes: 304 & 681
- GNIS feature ID: 1554500

Metz is an unincorporated community in Marion County, West Virginia, United States. Metz is located along U.S. Route 250, 3.5 miles (5.6 km) north-northwest of Mannington. Metz had a post office, which closed on August 27, 2011.

== History ==
Metz was founded by Jacob Metz in the early 1800s, well before the state of West Virginia was created in 1863. West Virginia was created by counties in Virginia that had remained loyal to the Union during the Civil War. Metz was never part of a Confederate state. The village of Metz was first known as "Bee Hive Station", because Jacob kept many bee hives. In 1850, representatives of the Baltimore & Ohio Railroad approached Jacob about buying land for a needed rights-of-way. Jacob agreed to give them the land providing they build a station and name it for him. Metz Crossing was shortened to just "Metz" and remains so even today.

== Climate ==
The climate in this area is characterized by relatively high temperatures and evenly distributed precipitation throughout the year. According to the Köppen Climate Classification system, Metz has a Humid subtropical climate, abbreviated "Cfa" on climate maps.

Climate data for Metz, West Virginia
Month	Jan	Feb	Mar	Apr	May	Jun	Jul	Aug	Sep	Oct	Nov	Dec	Year
Mean daily maximum °C (°F)	4 (39)	6 (43)	12 (53)	19 (66)	23 (74)	28 (82)	29 (85)	29 (84)	26 (78)	19 (67)	12 (54)	6 (42)	18 (64)
Mean daily minimum °C (°F)	−8 (17)	−7 (19)	−4 (25)	1 (34)	7 (44)	12 (53)	14 (58)	14 (57)	9 (49)	3 (37)	−2 (29)	−6 (21)	3 (37)
Average precipitation mm (inches)	94 (3.7)	81 (3.2)	100 (4.1)	97 (3.8)	120 (4.6)	110 (4.4)	130 (5.1)	110 (4.3)	91 (3.6)	76 (3)	89 (3.5)	91 (3.6)	1,190 (46.8)
Source: Weatherbase
