= Hebron, Marion County, West Virginia =

Hebron
- Unincorporated community
- Location within the state of West Virginia Hebron (the United States)
- Coordinates: 39°24′7″N 80°2′7″W
- Country: United States
- State: West Virginia
- County: Marion
- Time zone: UTC-5 (Eastern (EST))
  - Summer (DST): UTC-4 (EDT)
- GNIS feature ID: 1718160

Hebron is an unincorporated community on Glady Creek in Marion County, West Virginia, United States. It takes its name from the Hebron Church there.
