= Colfax, West Virginia =

Unincorporated community in West Virginia, United States

- Unincorporated community
- Location within West Virginia Location within the United States
- Coordinates: 39°26′05″N 80°07′54″W
- Country: United States
- State: West Virginia
- County: Marion
- Elevation: 899 ft (274 m)
- Time zone: UTC-5 (Eastern (EST))
  - Summer (DST): UTC-4 (EDT)
- ZIP code: 26566
- Area codes: 304 & 681
- GNIS feature ID: 1537519

Colfax is an unincorporated community in Marion County, West Virginia, United States. Colfax is 3.5 miles (5.6 km) south of downtown Fairmont. Colfax has a post office with ZIP code 26566.
