= Viola, Marion County, West Virginia =

Viola
- Unincorporated community
- Location within the state of West Virginia Viola (the United States)
- Coordinates: 39°30′47″N 80°6′2″W
- Country: United States
- State: West Virginia
- County: Marion
- Elevation: 863 ft (263 m)
- Time zone: UTC-5 (Eastern (EST))
  - Summer (DST): UTC-4 (EDT)
- GNIS ID: 1555893

Viola is an unincorporated community in Marion County, West Virginia, United States.
