= Kingmont, West Virginia =

- Unincorporated community
- Location within West Virginia Location within the United States
- Coordinates: 39°26′49″N 80°10′33″W
- Country: United States
- State: West Virginia
- County: Marion
- Elevation: 971 ft (296 m)
- Time zone: UTC-5 (Eastern (EST))
  - Summer (DST): UTC-4 (EDT)
- ZIP code: 26578
- Area codes: 304 & 681
- GNIS feature ID: 1554883

Kingmont is an unincorporated community in Marion County, West Virginia, United States. Kingmont is located along Interstate 79, 3 miles (4.8 km) southwest of downtown Fairmont. Kingmont has a post office with ZIP code 26578.
