= Beverly Hills, Marion County, West Virginia =

Unincorporated community in West Virginia, United States

Beverly Hills
- Unincorporated community
- Location within the state of West Virginia Beverly Hills (the United States)
- Coordinates: 39°28′47″N 80°10′7″W
- Country: United States
- State: West Virginia
- County: Marion
- Time zone: UTC-5 (Eastern (EST))
  - Summer (DST): UTC-4 (EDT)
- GNIS feature ID: 1553886

Beverly Hills is an unincorporated community adjacent to the city of Fairmont in Marion County, West Virginia, United States.
