= Pleasant View, Jackson County, West Virginia =

- Unincorporated community
- Location within West Virginia Location within the United States
- Coordinates: 38°55′21″N 81°47′17″W
- Country: United States
- State: West Virginia
- County: Jackson
- Elevation: 594 ft (181 m)
- Time zone: UTC-5 (Eastern (EST))
  - Summer (DST): UTC-4 (EDT)
- Area codes: 304 & 681
- GNIS feature ID: 1549876

Pleasant View is an unincorporated community in Jackson County, West Virginia, United States. Pleasant View is located on the Ohio River and West Virginia Route 2, 2.3 miles (3.7 km) southwest of Ravenswood. Pleasant View once had a post office, which is now closed.
