= White Hall, West Virginia =

- Town
- Flag

- Location of White Hall in Marion County, West Virginia.
- Coordinates: 39°25′34″N 80°11′1″W
- Country: United States
- State: West Virginia
- County: Marion
- Incorporated: December 8, 1992

Area
  - Total: 1.05 sq mi (2.73 km^{2})
  - Land: 1.05 sq mi (2.73 km^{2})
  - Water: 0 sq mi (0.00 km^{2})
- Elevation: 1,158 ft (353 m)

Population (2020)
  - Total: 700
  - Estimate (2021): 705
  - Density: 632.9/sq mi (244.35/km^{2})
- Time zone: UTC-5 (Eastern (EST))
  - Summer (DST): UTC-4 (EDT)
- ZIP codes: 26554-26555
- Area code: 304
- FIPS code: 54-86620
- GNIS feature ID: 1555973
- Website: www.townofwhitehallwv.org

White Hall is a town in Marion County, West Virginia, United States. The population was 706 at the 2020 census. Incorporated on December 8, 1992, White Hall is adjacent to the county seat, Fairmont, and is part of the Fairmont, West Virginia, Micropolitan Statistical Area. White Hall has many different stores and restaurants.

== Geography ==
White Hall is located at 39°25′34″N 80°11′1″W (39.426223, -80.183541).

According to the United States Census Bureau, the town has a total area of 1.05 square miles (2.72 km^{2}), all land.

== Demographics ==
Historical population
Census	Pop.	Note	%±
2000	595		—
2010	648		8.9%
2020	700		8.0%
2021 (est.)	705	▲	0.7%
U.S. Decennial Census

=== 2010 census ===
At the 2010 census there were 648 people, 299 households, and 178 families living in the town. The population density was 617.1 inhabitants per square mile (238.3/km^{2}). There were 313 housing units at an average density of 298.1 per square mile (115.1/km^{2}). The racial makeup of the town was 91.5% White, 2.5% African American, 0.2% Native American, 3.1% Asian, 0.3% from other races, and 2.5% from two or more races. Hispanic or Latino of any race were 1.9%.

Of the 299 households 20.7% had children under the age of 18 living with them, 46.2% were married couples living together, 10.7% had a female householder with no husband present, 2.7% had a male householder with no wife present, and 40.5% were non-families. 32.8% of households were one person and 9.7% were one person aged 65 or older. The average household size was 2.17 and the average family size was 2.78.

The median age in the town was 40.9 years. 17.9% of residents were under the age of 18; 10.3% were between the ages of 18 and 24; 26.4% were from 25 to 44; 29.8% were from 45 to 64; and 15.6% were 65 or older. The gender makeup of the town was 48.5% male and 51.5% female.

=== 2000 census ===
At the 2000 census there were 595 people, 262 households, and 161 families living in the town. The population density was 624.7 inhabitants per square mile (241.8/km^{2}). There were 295 housing units at an average density of 309.7 per square mile (119.9/km^{2}). The racial makeup of the town was 93.61% White, 2.18% African American, 2.18% Asian, 1.18% from other races, and 0.84% from two or more races. Hispanic or Latino of any race were 2.18%.

Of the 262 households 26.3% had children under the age of 18 living with them, 48.5% were married couples living together, 9.2% had a female householder with no husband present, and 38.5% were non-families. 32.1% of households were one person and 9.2% were one person aged 65 or older. The average household size was 2.27 and the average family size was 2.90.

The age distribution was 18.7% under the age of 18, 13.6% from 18 to 24, 32.3% from 25 to 44, 22.9% from 45 to 64, and 12.6% 65 or older. The median age was 35 years. For every 100 females there were 91.3 males. For every 100 females age 18 and over, there were 92.8 males.

The median household income was $412,813 and the median family income was $501,625. Males had a median income of $391,286 versus $291,722 for females. The per capita income for the town was $211,188. About 11.2% of families and 14.9% of the population were below the poverty line, including 25.0% of those under age 18 and 3.0% of those age 65 or over.
