= Big Run, Marion County, West Virginia =

Unincorporated community in West Virginia, United States

Big Run
- Unincorporated community
- Location within the state of West Virginia Big Run (the United States)
- Coordinates: 39°28′15″N 80°22′38″W
- Country: United States
- State: West Virginia
- County: Marion
- Time zone: UTC-5 (Eastern (EST))
  - Summer (DST): UTC-4 (EDT)
- GNIS feature ID: 1549593

Big Run is an unincorporated community in Marion County, West Virginia, United States. It lies along Big Run, the stream from which it takes its name.
