= Montana, West Virginia =

- Unincorporated community
- Location within West Virginia Location within the United States
- Coordinates: 39°31′24″N 80°06′34″W
- Country: United States
- State: West Virginia
- County: Marion
- Elevation: 1,014 ft (309 m)
- Time zone: UTC-5 (Eastern (EST))
  - Summer (DST): UTC-4 (EDT)
- Area codes: 304 & 681
- GNIS feature ID: 1555150

Montana is an unincorporated community in Marion County, West Virginia, United States. Montana is located on the Monongahela River across from Rivesville.
