= Carolina, West Virginia =

- Unincorporated town
- Location in Marion County and the state of West Virginia.
- Coordinates: 39°28′49″N 80°16′24″W
- Country: United States
- State: West Virginia
- County: Marion

Area
  - Total: 0.831 sq mi (2.15 km^{2})
  - Land: 0.830 sq mi (2.15 km^{2})
  - Water: 0.001 sq mi (0.0026 km^{2})
- Elevation: 1,184 ft (361 m)

Population (2020)
  - Total: 390
  - Density: 470/sq mi (180/km^{2})
- Time zone: UTC-5 (Eastern (EST))
  - Summer (DST): UTC-4 (EDT)
- ZIP code: 26563
- Area codes: 304 & 681
- GNIS feature ID: 1554077

Carolina is an unincorporated town in Marion County, West Virginia, United States. Carolina is 2 miles (3.2 km) north-northwest of Worthington. Carolina has a post office with ZIP code 26563. It has been designated a census-designated place (CDP); as of the 2020 census, its population was 390 (down from 411 at the 2010 census).

The community was named after Caroline Watson, a daughter of mining executive James Watson. Consolidated Coal Company bought lands in the area for mining in 1914, and starting building the village in 1915.

== Notable person ==
Carolina is the hometown of Alabama Crimson Tide football head coach Nick Saban.
