= Carrie Watson Fleming =

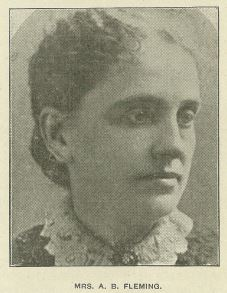
- Born: April 29, 1844; Fairmont, Virginia, US
- Died: July 19, 1931 (aged 87); Fairmont, West Virginia, US
- Known for: First lady of West Virginia, 1890-1893

Caroline Margaret Watson Fleming (1844–1931) was the wife of former Governor of West Virginia Aretas B. Fleming and served as that state's First Lady from 1890 to 1893.

== Biography ==
Fleming was born on April 29, 1844, at Fairmont, West Virginia, a daughter of Matilda Lamb and James Otis Watson, early coal operators in that region. She attended Mount de Chantal Visitation Academy at Wheeling, West Virginia.

In September 1865, she married the attorney for oil and gas magnate Johnson N. Camden: Aretas B. Fleming. They had one child, a daughter.

Her husband, Aretas Fleming, served as Governor of West Virginia from 1890-1893. After a shortened three year term as first lady, due to the controversial 1888 election, the Flemings returned to Fairmont, where she played a prominent role in Fairmont's cultural, civic, and religious activities.

In 1916, she signed a memorial from the West Virginia Association Opposed to Woman Suffrage that was sent to the legislature as they considered an amendment to the state constitution to expand the franchise to include women.

Fleming died at Fairmont on July 19, 1931, at the age of 87. She is buried next to her husband in the Woodlawn Cemetery.

Carolina, West Virginia is named after her. Her brother was Clarence W. Watson was a mining executive and became a U.S. Senator.

Honorary titles
Preceded by Henrietta Cotton Wilson	First Lady of West Virginia; 1890 – 1893	Succeeded by Belle Goshorn MacCorkle
