= Meadowdale, Marion County, West Virginia =

Meadowdale, West Virginia
- Unincorporated community
- Location within West Virginia Location within the United States
- Coordinates: 39°29′44″N 80°05′35″W
- Country: United States
- State: West Virginia
- County: Marion
- Elevation: 928 ft (283 m)
- Time zone: UTC-5 (Eastern (EST))
  - Summer (DST): UTC-4 (EDT)
- Area codes: 304 & 681
- GNIS feature ID: 1543080

Meadowdale is an unincorporated community in Marion County, West Virginia, United States. Meadowdale is located at the junction of County Routes 73, 72, and 33, 2.7 miles (4.3 km) east-northeast of Fairmont.
