= Marion County, West Virginia =

County in West Virginia, United States

- County
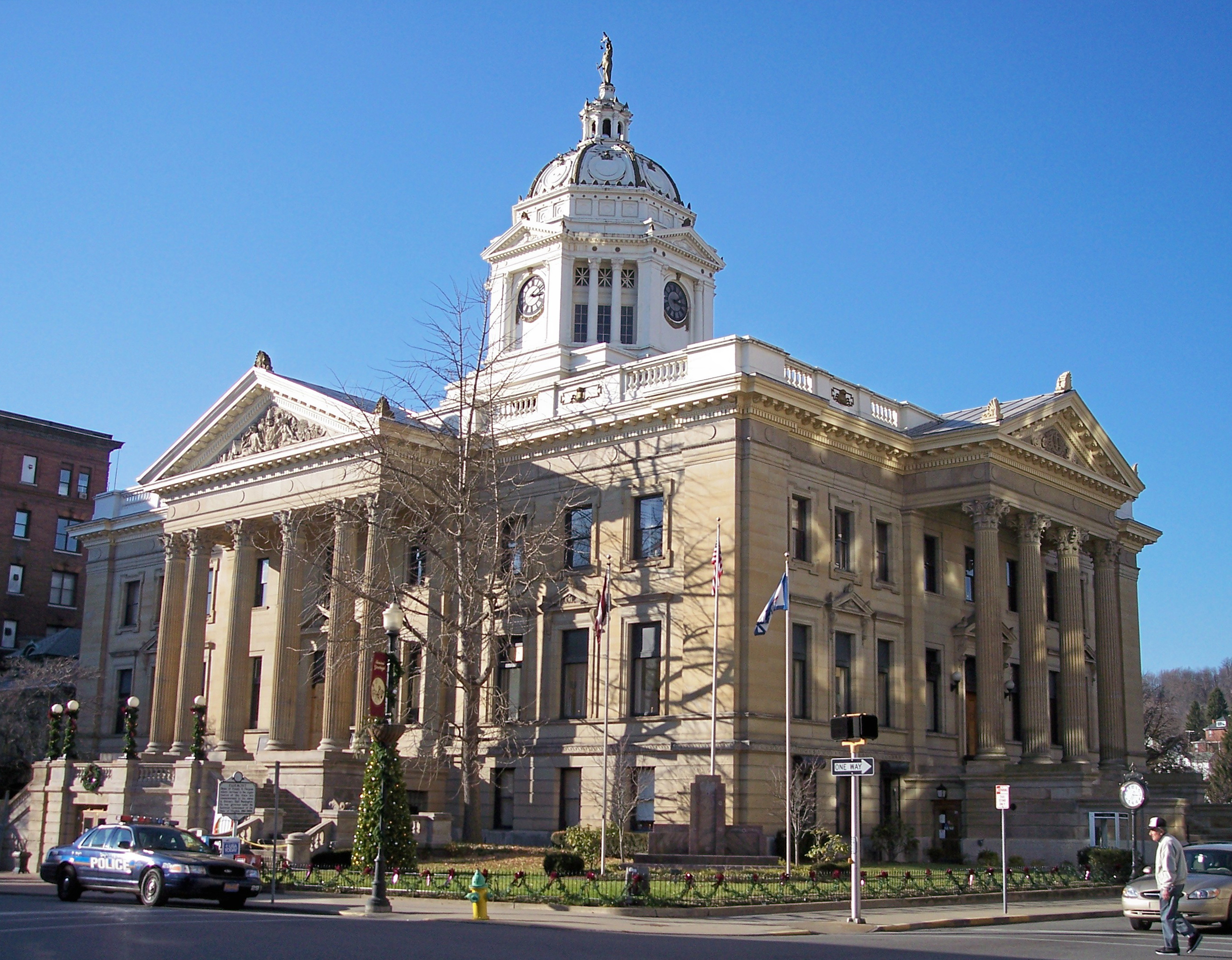
- Marion County Courthouse in Fairmont

- Flag Seal

- Location within the U.S. state of West Virginia
- Coordinates: 39°31′N 80°14′W
- Country: United States
- State: West Virginia
- Founded: January 14, 1842
- Named for: Francis Marion
- Seat: Fairmont
- Largest city: Fairmont

Area
  - Total: 312 sq mi (810 km^{2})
  - Land: 309 sq mi (800 km^{2})
  - Water: 2.8 sq mi (7.3 km^{2}) 0.9%

Population (2020)
  - Total: 56,205
  - Estimate (2025): 55,584 ▼
  - Density: 182/sq mi (70.2/km^{2})
- Time zone: UTC−5 (Eastern)
  - Summer (DST): UTC−4 (EDT)
- Congressional district: 1st
- Website: marioncountywv.com

Marion County is a county in the U.S. state of West Virginia. As of the 2020 census, the population was 56,205 and its county seat is Fairmont. The county was named in honor of General Francis Marion (ca. 1732–1795), known to history as "The Swamp Fox". Marion County comprises the Fairmont, WV Micropolitan Statistical Area, which is part of the larger Morgantown–Fairmont, WV Combined Statistical Area.

== History ==
The Adena and successor Hopewell cultures flourished in the area at one time. The region which includes the land now known as Marion County was sparsely occupied by Native Americans, if at all, in the late 18th century. Like much of the Ohio Valley, it had been depopulated by the Iroquois during the later Beaver Wars (1670–1700). Only a few abortive attempts to start European settlements on the Monongahela River or its branches (including one which gave its name to Dunkard Creek) are known prior to the French and Indian War. It was not until 1772 that any permanent settlements were made in this region.

Marion County was created by an act of the Virginia Assembly on January 14, 1842, from parts of Monongalia and Harrison counties. It was named after General Francis Marion, of American Revolutionary War fame, known to history as "The Swamp Fox".

Starting with the great flood on Monday, April 5, 1852 was an eventful year in Marion County's history. Heavy rains the day before caused the Monongahela and West Fork Rivers to rise at rate of 5 feet per hour until Tuesday afternoon, when the water reached 43 feet above its normal level. The greatest damage was sustained on the West Fork, where over 40 houses and buildings were swept away and floated past Fairmont. The flood damaged the railroad, which was in the final stages of being completed. By June 23 the Baltimore and Ohio Railroad was completed, connecting Fairmont to the west and to large cities in the east like Baltimore. The railroad required the building of a bridge to cross the Monongahela River about 1 mile west of Fairmont. That was achieved by building a massive iron bridge spanning 650 feet and lifted 35 feet above the water.

The third major event of the year 1852 was the completion of the Fairmont and Palatine suspension bridge, connecting Fairmont to what was then the town of Palatine. The bridge was built under the direction of James L. Randolph, assistant engineer of the Baltimore and Ohio Railroad, at a cost of about thirty thousand dollars.

Marion was one of fifty Virginia counties which were admitted to the Union as the state of West Virginia on June 20, 1863, at the height of the Civil War. In the months which followed, West Virginia's counties were divided into civil townships, with the intention of encouraging local government. This proved impractical in the heavily rural state, and in 1872 the townships were converted into magisterial districts. Marion County was divided into seven districts: Fairmont, Grant, Lincoln, Mannington, Paw Paw, (Note: Also spelled "Pawpaw" in early records.) Union, and Winfield. In the 1980s, the historic magisterial districts were consolidated into three new districts: Middletown, Palatine, and West Augusta.

== Geography ==
According to the United States Census Bureau, the county has a total area of 312 square miles (810 km^{2}), of which 309 square miles (800 km^{2}) is land and 2.8 square miles (7.3 km^{2}) (0.9%) is water.

=== Major highways ===
- Interstate 79
- U.S. Highway 19
- U.S. Highway 250
- West Virginia Route 218
- West Virginia Route 273
- West Virginia Route 310

=== Adjacent counties ===
- Monongalia County (north)
- Taylor County (southeast)
- Harrison County (south)
- Wetzel County (west)

== Demographics ==
Historical population
Census	Pop.	Note	%±
1850	10,552		—
1860	12,722		20.6%
1870	12,107		−4.8%
1880	17,198		42.1%
1890	20,721		20.5%
1900	32,430		56.5%
1910	42,794		32.0%
1920	54,571		27.5%
1930	66,655		22.1%
1940	68,683		3.0%
1950	71,521		4.1%
1960	63,717		−10.9%
1970	61,356		−3.7%
1980	65,789		7.2%
1990	57,249		−13.0%
2000	56,598		−1.1%
2010	56,418		−0.3%
2020	56,205		−0.4%
2025 (est.)	55,584	▼	−1.1%
U.S. Decennial Census; 1790–1960 1900–1990; 1990–2000 2010–2020

=== 2020 census ===
As of the 2020 census, the county had a population of 56,205. Of the residents, 20.1% were under the age of 18 and 20.2% were 65 years of age or older; the median age was 41.7 years. For every 100 females there were 96.2 males, and for every 100 females age 18 and over there were 94.2 males.

The racial makeup of the county was 90.0% White, 3.3% Black or African American, 0.2% American Indian and Alaska Native, 0.5% Asian, 0.4% from some other race, and 5.6% from two or more races. Hispanic or Latino residents of any race comprised 1.6% of the population.

Of the 23,223 households, 26.7% had children under the age of 18 living with them and 26.2% had a female householder with no spouse or partner present. About 29.4% of all households were made up of individuals and 13.2% had someone living alone who was 65 years of age or older. Of those households, 48.3% were married couples living together and 19.5% had a male householder with no spouse present; the average household and family size was 2.89.

There were 26,280 housing units, of which 11.6% were vacant. Among occupied housing units, 75.0% were owner-occupied and 25.0% were renter-occupied. The homeowner vacancy rate was 1.6% and the rental vacancy rate was 10.5%.

Marion County, West Virginia – Racial and ethnic composition Note: the US Census treats Hispanic/Latino as an ethnic category. This table excludes Latinos from the racial categories and assigns them to a separate category. Hispanics/Latinos may be of any race.
Race / Ethnicity (NH = Non-Hispanic)	Pop 2000	Pop 2010	Pop 2020	% 2000	% 2010	% 2020
White alone (NH)	53,508	52,874	50,223	94.54%	93.71%	89.35%
Black or African American alone (NH)	1,816	1,838	1,844	3.20%	3.25%	3.28%
Native American or Alaska Native alone (NH)	107	101	119	0.18%	0.17%	0.21%
Asian alone (NH)	228	281	256	0.40%	0.49%	0.45%
Pacific Islander alone (NH)	5	5	43	0.00%	0.00%	0.07%
Other race alone (NH)	36	43	116	0.06%	0.07%	0.20%
Mixed race or Multiracial (NH)	504	762	2,729	0.89%	1.35%	4.85%
Hispanic or Latino (any race)	394	514	875	0.69%	0.91%	1.55%
Total	56,598	56,418	56,205	100.00%	100.00%	100.00%

=== Income and poverty ===
According to the United States Census Bureau's QuickFacts, the median income for a household was $55,094 and the poverty rate was 14.6%.

=== 2010 census ===
As of the census of 2010, there were 56,418 people, 23,786 households, and 15,271 families living in the county. The population density was 182.7 inhabitants per square mile (70.5/km^{2}). There were 26,463 housing units at an average density of 85.7 units per square mile (33.1 units/km^{2}).

The racial makeup of the county was 94.3% white, 3.3% black or African American, 0.5% Asian, 0.2% American Indian, 0.2% from other races, and 1.5% from two or more races. Those of Hispanic or Latino origin made up 0.9% of the population. In terms of ancestry, 23.5% were German, 17.8% were Irish, 13.7% were American, 12.0% were English, and 10.3% were Italian.

Of the 23,786 households, 27.1% had children under the age of 18 living with them, 48.5% were married couples living together, 11.1% had a female householder with no husband present, 35.8% were non-families, and 29.3% of all households were made up of individuals. The average household size was 2.32 and the average family size was 2.85. The median age was 41.0 years.

The median income for a household in the county was $38,115 and the median income for a family was $49,046. Males had a median income of $38,948 versus $27,179 for females. The per capita income for the county was $20,752. About 11.3% of families and 16.8% of the population were below the poverty line, including 24.0% of those under age 18 and 8.6% of those age 65 or over.

=== 2000 census ===
As of the census of 2000, there were 56,598 people, 23,652 households, and 15,515 families living in the county. The population density was 183 people per square mile (71 people/km^{2}). There were 26,660 housing units at an average density of 86 units per square mile (33 units/km^{2}). The racial makeup of the county was 95.10% White, 3.22% Black or African American, 0.20% Native American, 0.41% Asian, 0.01% Pacific Islander, 0.13% from other races, and 0.93% from two or more races. 0.70% of the population were Hispanic or Latino of any race.

There were 23,652 households, out of which 26.00% had children under the age of 18 living with them, 51.40% were married couples living together, 10.70% had a female householder with no husband present, and 34.40% were non-families. 28.90% of all households were made up of individuals, and 13.90% had someone living alone who was 65 years of age or older. The average household size was 2.34 and the average family size was 2.88. In the county, the population was spread out, with 20.60% under the age of 18, 10.50% from 18 to 24, 26.40% from 25 to 44, 24.70% from 45 to 64, and 17.80% who were 65 years of age or older. The median age was 40 years. For every 100 females there were 90.60 males. For every 100 females age 18 and over, there were 87.30 males.

The median income for a household in the county was $28,626, and the median income for a family was $37,182. Males had a median income of $29,005 versus $21,100 for females. The per capita income for the county was $16,246. About 11.70% of families and 16.30% of the population were below the poverty line, including 21.30% of those under age 18 and 8.70% of those age 65 or over.

== Politics ==
Marion County, like most counties in West Virginia, was historically Democratic, particularly in the latter half of the 20th century. From 1932 to 2008, the county only voted Republican in a presidential election once: for Richard Nixon in 1972 amidst a national landslide. However, like the rest of West Virginia, Marion County has trended heavily Republican in the 21st century, albeit at a somewhat slower pace than most of the state. In 2012, Republican Mitt Romney flipped the county for the first time since Nixon's victory, and it has voted Republican in each election since. In 2016, 2020, and 2024, Republican Donald Trump carried Marion County with more than 60% of the vote, with all performances the best ever for any Republican in the county.

United States presidential election results for Marion County, West Virginia
Year	Republican		Democratic		Third party(ies)	
Year	No.	%	No.	%	No.	%
1912	1,625	17.23%	4,535	48.08%	3,273	34.70%
1916	4,443	42.81%	5,493	52.92%	443	4.27%
1920	11,494	55.23%	8,734	41.97%	583	2.80%
1924	12,167	50.56%	9,386	39.00%	2,513	10.44%
1928	16,088	60.34%	10,133	38.00%	442	1.66%
1932	12,638	42.89%	15,975	54.22%	851	2.89%
1936	11,403	35.15%	20,859	64.29%	181	0.56%
1940	13,349	38.82%	21,035	61.18%	0	0.00%
1944	11,584	39.64%	17,640	60.36%	0	0.00%
1948	11,201	35.72%	19,866	63.35%	290	0.92%
1952	14,979	42.96%	19,890	57.04%	0	0.00%
1956	16,112	49.88%	16,192	50.12%	0	0.00%
1960	14,138	44.12%	17,903	55.88%	0	0.00%
1964	7,707	25.90%	22,047	74.10%	0	0.00%
1968	10,177	34.78%	17,246	58.94%	1,838	6.28%
1972	16,095	57.57%	11,864	42.43%	0	0.00%
1976	10,391	36.86%	17,800	63.14%	0	0.00%
1980	10,952	41.37%	14,189	53.60%	1,330	5.02%
1984	13,106	48.50%	13,833	51.20%	81	0.30%
1988	9,229	38.87%	14,441	60.82%	72	0.30%
1992	6,380	25.32%	14,042	55.74%	4,772	18.94%
1996	6,160	27.86%	12,994	58.78%	2,953	13.36%
2000	9,972	43.60%	12,315	53.84%	586	2.56%
2004	12,150	48.23%	12,771	50.69%	273	1.08%
2008	11,501	48.45%	11,618	48.94%	621	2.62%
2012	12,054	55.93%	8,959	41.57%	540	2.51%
2016	14,668	62.77%	6,964	29.80%	1,735	7.43%
2020	16,300	63.18%	8,901	34.50%	598	2.32%
2024	15,881	64.47%	8,185	33.23%	568	2.31%

== Communities ==
=== Cities ===
- Fairmont (county seat)
- Mannington
- Pleasant Valley

=== Towns ===
- Fairview
- Barrackville
- Farmington
- Grant Town
- Monongah
- Rivesville
- Whitehall
- Worthington

=== Magisterial districts ===
- Middletown
- Palatine
- West Augusta

=== Census-designated places ===
- Baxter
- Carolina
- Idamay
- Rachel

=== Unincorporated communities ===
- Basnettville
- Beverly Hills
- Big Run
- Boothsville
- Brink
- Bunner Ridge
- Catawba
- Colfax
- Flyblow
- Forksburg
- Four States
- Grays Flat
- Hebron
- Highland
- Hopewell
- Hutchinson
- Joetown
- Jordan
- Katy
- Kingmont
- Logansport
- Meadowdale
- Metz
- Montana
- Montana Mines
- Paw Paw
- Pettyjohn
- Pine Grove
- Pleasant View
- Quiet Dell
- Shagtown
- Seven Pines
- Stringtown
- Viola
- Wahoo
- Watson
- Winfield

== Notable people ==
- David Carpenter, Major League Baseball pitcher
- Frank Kendall Everest, Jr., The Fastest Man Alive and aviator
- Michael Garrison, former president of West Virginia University in Morgantown
- Frank Gatski, National Football League player in the Pro Football Hall of Fame (played for the Cleveland Browns and Detroit Lions)
- Sam Huff, Pro Football Hall of Fame linebacker (New York Giants, Washington Redskins)
- Johnnie Johnson, musician
- John Knowles, author
- Joe Manchin, the former governor of West Virginia and former United States senator from West Virginia.
- Luella Mundel, professor and McCarthyism victim
- Francis H. Pierpont, father of West Virginia
- Mary Lou Retton, all-around gymnastics Olympic gold medal winner (1984 Olympic Games).
- Rich Rodriguez, college football coach (West Virginia, Michigan, Arizona, Jacksonville State)
- Nick Saban, former head football coach at Toledo, Michigan State, LSU, Alabama, and in the NFL with the Miami Dolphins
- Harrison C. Summers, WWII hero
- Natalie Tennant, Secretary of State of West Virginia and 2014 U.S. Senate candidate
- Robert Tinnell, director, writer, producer
- Hershel W. Williams, Medal of Honor recipient in the Battle of Iwo Jima
- Tom Wilson, creator of the comic strip Ziggy
- Fielding H. Yost, football coach (Michigan)

== Literary presence ==
In the 1632 series of science fiction novels, the fictional town of Grantville (closely modeled after real-life Mannington) and its environs were part of Marion County until a spacetime anomaly caused by aliens which sent it to 17th-century Thuringia. The county and its institutions are frequently mentioned in the course of the series, and writers interested in the series have held a number of "mini-cons" (miniature science fiction conventions) in Mannington. Flint has said, "The town of Grantville is very closely modeled on the actual town of Mannington. There are rules that I require everyone to follow when they write in the series. One of them is that it if it wasn’t in the town of Mannington in 2000, you can’t have it in Grantville. The one cheat I had to do was that I needed a power plant. The power plant is about 15 miles away, in a town called Granttown, so I just sorta moved it over. That’s the only real cheat.”

== See also ==
- Fairmont Marion County Transit Authority
- National Register of Historic Places listings in Marion County, West Virginia
- Prickett's Fort State Park
