= Farmington, West Virginia =

- Town
- Logo
- Motto: "The Heart of Marion County"
- Location of Farmington in Marion County, West Virginia

- Location within West Virginia Location within the United States
- Coordinates: 39°30′47″N 80°15′7″W
- Country: United States
- State: West Virginia
- County: Marion
- Incorporated: 1896

Government
  - Type: Town Council
  - Mayor: Bill Glasscock

Area
  - Total: 0.43 sq mi (1.11 km^{2})
  - Land: 0.42 sq mi (1.08 km^{2})
  - Water: 0.012 sq mi (0.03 km^{2})
- Elevation: 932 ft (284 m)

Population (2020)
  - Total: 392
  - Estimate (2021): 403
  - Density: 878.7/sq mi (339.28/km^{2})
- Time zone: UTC-5 (Eastern (EST))
  - Summer (DST): UTC-4 (EDT)
- ZIP code: 26571
- Area code: 304
- FIPS code: 54-26932
- GNIS feature ID: 1554446
- Website: https://www.townoffarmingtonwv.gov/

Farmington is a town in Marion County, West Virginia, United States. The population was 389 at the 2020 census. The small town is situated on Buffalo Creek and the Allegheny Mountains about 6 miles west of Fairmont, Marion County's county seat. It is best known for being the site of the 1968 Farmington Mine disaster.

== History ==
The community was named for the fact a large share of the first settlers were farmers. The area was first settled by James Goodin, Nicholas Wood, Jacob Straight, and by William Willey (father of Senator Waitman Willey) in the late 1700s. Their first settlements were built on and around the Chatham Hill area. A later settler, Joseph Morgan, built the town's first grist, saw, and carding mill here in 1801, and Daniel Tennant built the first steam grist mill in 1883. In addition to the listed settlers, many other of the first families to settle Farmington included names such as Bock, Downs, Dudley, Martin, Laidley, and Yost. Several of these first families took part in the defense of western Virginia against Natives during the American Revolution, serving with the Monongalia County Militia or other Continental Regiments. In Spring of 1861, a small force of Confederate forces burnt a railroad bridge near the town, which resulted in General George B. McLellan sending Colonel Benjamin Kelley and Union West Virginia infantry to secure the area prior to the Battle of Phillipi.As the community grew, it would later be incorporated in Marion County as the town of Farmington in 1896, but was earlier known as Willeyvile, Willeytown, and Underwood. While it was officially named Farmington in 1896, when the Baltimore and Ohio Railroad ran through the town its stations there went under the name Underwood because of there being many towns of the same name. The town was close to mine Number 08 of Jamison Coal and Coke Company. The mine exploded in 1926 and was sealed in the 1940s. The town is also close to mine Number 09 of Consolidated Coal Company, which is the site of the 1968 Farmington Mine disaster that killed 78 people. The mine had previously exploded in 1954 and was eventually sealed in 1978 following recovery efforts and investigations.

== Education ==
For public education, the town is part of Marion County Schools, which covers all of Marion County. Preschool through grade three attend Fairview Elementary School and grades four through eight attend Fairview Middle School, both in nearby Fairview, while students in grades nine through twelve attend North Marion High School, which is located approximately 2 miles (3.2 km) east of Farmington on US Route 250 and has a Farmington mailing address. Adjacent to North Marion High School is the Marion County Technical Center, which houses vocational and career tech programs available to high school students from the entire district.

Prior to 1975, Farmington had its own high school, Farmington High School. Athletic teams were known as the Farmers. It was closed due to structural issues caused by mine subsidence, which affected several other properties in town during the 1970s. North Marion opened four years later as a consolidation of the remaining surrounding high schools.

== Geography ==
Farmington is located at 39°30′47″N 80°15′7″W (39.512979, -80.252060), along Buffalo Creek.

According to the United States Census Bureau, the town has a total area of 0.43 square miles (1.11 km^{2}), of which 0.42 square miles (1.09 km^{2}) is land and 0.01 square miles (0.03 km^{2}) is water.

== Demographics ==
Historical population
Census	Pop.	Note	%±
1870	89		—
1880	179		101.1%
1910	519		—
1920	679		30.8%
1930	819		20.6%
1940	880		7.4%
1950	824		−6.4%
1960	709		−14.0%
1970	595		−16.1%
1980	583		−2.0%
1990	414		−29.0%
2000	387		−6.5%
2010	375		−3.1%
2020	392		4.5%
2021 (est.)	403	▲	2.8%
U.S. Decennial Census

=== 2010 census ===
As of the census of 2010, there were 375 people, 163 households, and 111 families living in the town. The population density was 892.9 inhabitants per square mile (344.8/km^{2}). There were 192 housing units at an average density of 457.1 per square mile (176.5/km^{2}). The racial makeup of the town was 97.9% White, 0.3% Asian, and 1.9% from two or more races. Hispanic or Latino of any race were 0.3% of the population.

There were 163 households, of which 30.7% had children under the age of 18 living with them, 51.5% were married couples living together, 9.8% had a female householder with no husband present, 6.7% had a male householder with no wife present, and 31.9% were non-families. 28.8% of all households were made up of individuals, and 13.5% had someone living alone who was 65 years of age or older. The average household size was 2.30 and the average family size was 2.80.

The median age in the town was 39.6 years. 21.9% of residents were under the age of 18; 5.2% were between the ages of 18 and 24; 31.4% were from 25 to 44; 24.3% were from 45 to 64; and 17.1% were 65 years of age or older. The gender makeup of the town was 49.9% male and 50.1% female.

=== 2000 census ===
As of the census of 2000, there were 387 people, 163 households, and 108 families living in the town. The population density was 917.3 inhabitants per square mile (355.8/km^{2}). There were 194 housing units at an average density of 459.8 per square mile (178.3/km^{2}). The racial makeup of the town was 96.90% White, 1.81% African American, and 1.29% from two or more races.

There were 163 households, out of which 26.4% had children under the age of 18 living with them, 42.9% were married couples living together, 17.2% had a female householder with no husband present, and 33.7% were non-families. 30.1% of all households were made up of individuals, and 19.0% had someone living alone who was 65 years of age or older. The average household size was 2.37 and the average family size was 2.93.

In the town, the population was spread out, with 23.5% under the age of 18, 7.0% from 18 to 24, 27.4% from 25 to 44, 23.0% from 45 to 64, and 19.1% who were 65 years of age or older. The median age was 37 years. For every 100 females, there were 85.2 males. For every 100 females age 18 and over, there were 81.6 males.

The median income for a household in the town was $29,375, and the median income for a family was $39,688. Males had a median income of $31,250 versus $18,750 for females. The per capita income for the town was $15,990. About 5.9% of families and 9.0% of the population were below the poverty line, including 17.3% of those under age 18 and 1.3% of those age 65 or over.

== Notable people ==
- Frank Gatski, athlete in the Pro Football Hall of Fame
- Sam Huff, Pro Football Hall of Fame
- Joe Manchin, U.S. senator for West Virginia (2010-2025)
- Waitman T. Willey, U.S. senator for the Restored Government of Virginia and West Virginia

== See also ==
- Other Farmingtons
- Fairmont Marion County Transit Authority
