= Worthington, West Virginia =

- Town
- Main Street (Route 19) in Worthington in 2026

- Location of Worthington in Marion County, West Virginia.
- Coordinates: 39°27′6″N 80°15′46″W
- Country: United States
- State: West Virginia
- County: Marion
- Incorporated: 1893

Area
  - Total: 0.60 sq mi (1.55 km^{2})
  - Land: 0.58 sq mi (1.51 km^{2})
  - Water: 0.015 sq mi (0.04 km^{2})
- Elevation: 922 ft (281 m)

Population (2020)
  - Total: 179
  - Estimate (2021): 182
  - Density: 253.9/sq mi (98.02/km^{2})
- Time zone: UTC-5 (Eastern (EST))
  - Summer (DST): UTC-4 (EDT)
- ZIP code: 26591
- Area code: 304
- FIPS code: 54-88708
- GNIS feature ID: 1556026
- Website: local.wv.gov/worthington/Pages/default.aspx

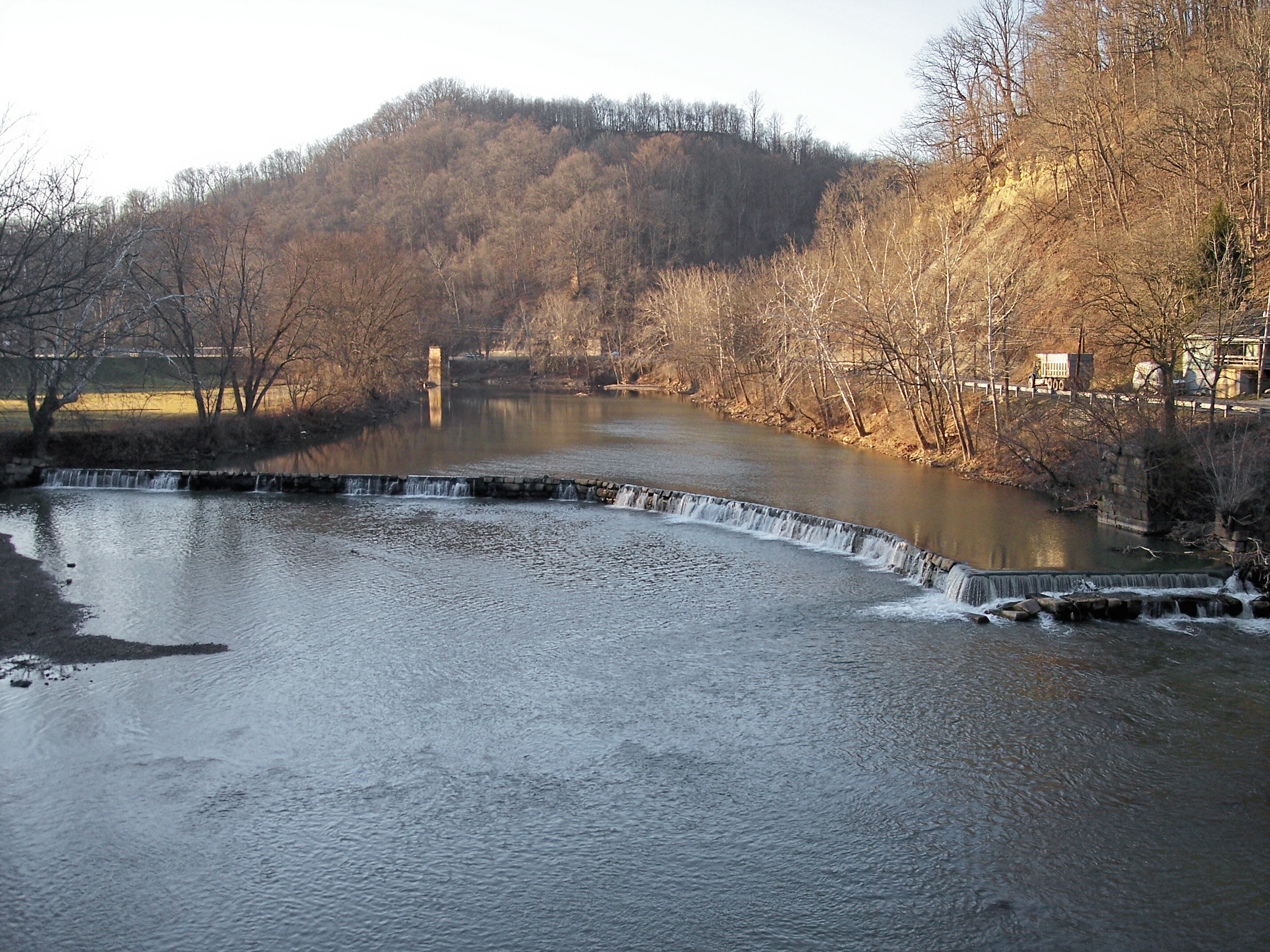
The West Fork River in Worthington in 2006

Worthington is a town in Marion County, West Virginia, United States. The population was 183 at the 2020 census. Worthington was incorporated in 1893 and named for Colonel George Worthington, an early settler. U.S. Route 19 passes through the town.

== Geography ==
Worthington is located at 39°27′6″N 80°15′46″W (39.451617, -80.262755), along the West Fork River.

According to the United States Census Bureau, the town has a total area of 0.60 square miles (1.55 km^{2}), of which 0.58 square miles (1.50 km^{2}) is land and 0.02 square miles (0.05 km^{2}) is water.

== Demographics ==
Historical population
Census	Pop.	Note	%±
1860	120		—
1870	127		5.8%
1880	87		−31.5%
1910	292		—
1920	381		30.5%
1930	405		6.3%
1940	507		25.2%
1950	544		7.3%
1960	361		−33.6%
1970	288		−20.2%
1980	329		14.2%
1990	233		−29.2%
2000	170		−27.0%
2010	158		−7.1%
2020	179		13.3%
2021 (est.)	182	▲	1.7%
U.S. Decennial Census

=== 2010 census ===
As of the census of 2010, there were 158 people, 67 households, and 47 families living in the town. The population density was 272.4 inhabitants per square mile (105.2/km^{2}). There were 82 housing units at an average density of 141.4 per square mile (54.6/km^{2}). The racial makeup of the town was 98.1% White and 1.9% from two or more races. Hispanic or Latino of any race were 2.5% of the population.

There were 67 households, of which 26.9% had children under the age of 18 living with them, 52.2% were married couples living together, 10.4% had a female householder with no husband present, 7.5% had a male householder with no wife present, and 29.9% were non-families. 26.9% of all households were made up of individuals, and 10.5% had someone living alone who was 65 years of age or older. The average household size was 2.36 and the average family size was 2.83.

The median age in the town was 42 years. 19.6% of residents were under the age of 18; 7% were between the ages of 18 and 24; 28.5% were from 25 to 44; 30.4% were from 45 to 64; and 14.6% were 65 years of age or older. The gender makeup of the town was 48.1% male and 51.9% female.

=== 2000 census ===
As of the census of 2000, there were 170 people, 76 households, and 48 families living in the town. The population density was 296.2 inhabitants per square mile (115.2/km^{2}). There were 93 housing units at an average density of 162.0 per square mile (63.0/km^{2}). The racial makeup of the town was 99.41% White, and 0.59% from two or more races.

There were 76 households, out of which 22.4% had children under the age of 18 living with them, 53.9% were married couples living together, 5.3% had a female householder with no husband present, and 36.8% were non-families. 32.9% of all households were made up of individuals, and 25.0% had someone living alone who was 65 years of age or older. The average household size was 2.24 and the average family size was 2.83.

In the town, the population was spread out, with 19.4% under the age of 18, 7.6% from 18 to 24, 32.9% from 25 to 44, 20.0% from 45 to 64, and 20.0% who were 65 years of age or older. The median age was 41 years. For every 100 females, there were 97.7 males. For every 100 females age 18 and over, there were 90.3 males.

The median income for a household in the town was $28,750, and the median income for a family was $35,417. Males had a median income of $24,750 versus $23,750 for females. The per capita income for the town was $14,490. About 10.2% of families and 15.0% of the population were below the poverty line, including 26.3% of those under the age of eighteen and none of those 65 or over.

== Infrastructure ==
=== Sewage issues ===
In February 2026, Governor Patrick Morrisey announced a 2 million dollar grant to partially replace Worthington's sewer system , which had been causing raw sewage to back up into residents' homes since 2025.

In April 2026, street journalist Michael Bowman was arrested for obstruction by the Marion County Sheriff's Office, while attempting to report on Worthington's sewage issues and the impact on its residents. The charges were later dropped. In July 2026 the Mayor of Worthington Debbie Heflin, stepped down from her position. It took the council 45 minutes to read her letter of resignation. According to her resignation letter, Heflin had attempted to resign four times prior but was warned by the West Virginia Public Service Commission wastewater division that if she did so there would be legal consequences. Melvin Linsey was selected as the new mayor by the town council during a July 31st, 2026 emergency meeting. On August 5th, 2026 former mayor Heflin filed legal motion that could dissolve the town.
