= Rivesville, West Virginia =

- Town
- Location of Rivesville in Marion County, West Virginia.
- Coordinates: 39°31′49″N 80°7′9″W
- Country: United States
- State: West Virginia
- County: Marion

Area
  - Total: 0.59 sq mi (1.54 km^{2})
  - Land: 0.53 sq mi (1.36 km^{2})
  - Water: 0.069 sq mi (0.18 km^{2})
- Elevation: 866 ft (264 m)

Population (2020)
  - Total: 828
  - Estimate (2021): 823
  - Density: 1,722.3/sq mi (664.98/km^{2})
- Time zone: UTC-5 (Eastern (EST))
  - Summer (DST): UTC-4 (EDT)
- ZIP code: 26588
- Area code: 304
- FIPS code: 54-68908
- GNIS feature ID: 1545784

Rivesville is a town and former coal town in Marion County, West Virginia, United States. The population was 830 at the 2020 census.

== Geography ==
Rivesville is located at 39°31′49″N 80°7′9″W (39.530276, -80.119063) in the heart of the Fairmont coal field on the north-west bank of the Monongahela River around its confluence with Paw Paw Creek.

According to the United States Census Bureau, the town has a total area of 0.59 square miles (1.53 km^{2}), of which 0.52 square miles (1.35 km^{2}) is land and 0.07 square miles (0.18 km^{2}) is water.

== Demographics ==
Historical population
Census	Pop.	Note	%±
1860	54		—
1870	63		16.7%
1880	136		115.9%
1890	165		21.3%
1900	164		−0.6%
1910	190		15.9%
1920	1,061		458.4%
1930	1,700		60.2%
1940	1,552		−8.7%
1950	1,343		−13.5%
1960	1,191		−11.3%
1970	1,108		−7.0%
1980	1,327		19.8%
1990	1,064		−19.8%
2000	913		−14.2%
2010	934		2.3%
2020	828		−11.3%
2021 (est.)	823	▼	−0.6%
U.S. Decennial Census

=== 2010 census ===
As of the census of 2010, there were 934 people, 402 households, and 261 families living in the town. The population density was 1,796.2 inhabitants per square mile (693.5/km^{2}). There were 430 housing units at an average density of 826.9 per square mile (319.3/km^{2}). The racial makeup of the town was 98.7% White, 0.6% African American, 0.5% Native American, and 0.1% from other races. Hispanic or Latino of any race were 0.3% of the population.

There were 402 households, of which 29.1% had children under the age of 18 living with them, 44.3% were married couples living together, 14.7% had a female householder with no husband present, 6.0% had a male householder with no wife present, and 35.1% were non-families. 29.9% of all households were made up of individuals, and 15.1% had someone living alone who was 65 years of age or older. The average household size was 2.32 and the average family size was 2.83.

The median age in the town was 42.1 years. 21.1% of residents were under the age of 18; 6% were between the ages of 18 and 24; 26.3% were from 25 to 44; 30.1% were from 45 to 64; and 16.6% were 65 years of age or older. The gender makeup of the town was 46.6% male and 53.4% female.

=== 2000 census ===
As of the census of 2000, there were 913 people, 400 households, and 268 families living in the town. The population density was 1,602.5 inhabitants per square mile (618.4/km^{2}). There were 450 housing units at an average density of 789.8 per square mile (304.8/km^{2}). The racial makeup of the town was 98.80% White, 0.11% African American, 0.11% Native American, 0.33% Asian, and 0.66% from two or more races. Hispanic or Latino of any race were 0.55% of the population.

There were 400 households, out of which 24.8% had children under the age of 18 living with them, 52.0% were married couples living together, 11.0% had a female householder with no husband present, and 33.0% were non-families. 30.8% of all households were made up of individuals, and 19.3% had someone living alone who was 65 years of age or older. The average household size was 2.28 and the average family size was 2.80.

In the town, the population was spread out, with 19.1% under the age of 18, 7.6% from 18 to 24, 25.0% from 25 to 44, 27.8% from 45 to 64, and 20.6% who were 65 years of age or older. The median age was 44 years. For every 100 females, there were 87.5 males. For every 100 females age 18 and over, there were 83.8 males.

The median income for a household in the town was $25,700, and the median income for a family was $35,417. Males had a median income of $26,875 versus $19,063 for females. The per capita income for the town was $14,085. About 16.4% of families and 19.9% of the population were below the poverty line, including 32.9% of those under age 18 and 12.9% of those age 65 or over.

== History ==
The area was populated by some of the earliest settlers to the area, with the safety of Prickett's Fort sitting directly across the Monongahela River. David Morgan (frontiersman) moved there in 1772. That's also the location where he saved his family from an attack by Indians in 1778, based on a fevered dream he had, while recuperating from an illness at the fort. The house still stands there in Rivesville. Now known as the Morgan-Gold House, it was listed on the National Register of Historic Places in 1985.

Rivesville was platted in 1837, and named after William Cabell Rives.

In 1900, it was a very small town, population 164, growing to 190 in 1910. This was immediately before the development of large-scale coal mining in the area and the subsequent population growth.

In the early 20th century, Rivesville was at the junction between the Pawpaw branch of the B&O Railroad and the Buckhannon & Northern Railroad, a branch of the Pittsburgh and Lake Erie a predecessor that was incorporated into the Monongahela Railway formed in 1915.

Rivesville was also served by the Fairmont-Clarksburg Division of the Monongahela-West Pen Railways, originally the Monongahela Power and Railway Company. This electric interurban line ran from Fairmont through Rivesville to the Rivesville Power Station, just north of town.

=== Folklore ===
==== The Ogua River Monster ====
On a summer night in 1983, a coal miner named John Edward White settled onto the riverbank to enjoy a relaxing night of fishing. The blackness of the water started to churn and a huge serpentine form rose from the depths. White stated that “a monstrous head, as big as a basketball, emerged mere yards away. Behing it, a powerful, writhing tall, longer than a pickup truck, whipped the surface to a froth.” This was a notorious encounter with the Ogua River Monster. The Ogua River Monster is one of America’s oldest and most intriguing river cryptid legends. Native tribes warned white settlers of the creatures ferocity. Some believe it to be a surviving relic of the dinosaur age, a gigantic alligator snapping turtle, or even a new species unknown to science.

== Institutions ==
=== Schools ===
The Rivesville Elementary/Middle school, formerly Rivesville High School, is administered by the Marion County Schools. It has 37 teachers and has been affiliated with the West Virginia University Benedum Collaborative as a Professional Development School since 1997. Tyson Furgason is currently principal. Based on 2007 test scores, the school ranked close to average for the state of West Virginia. In 2007, the school enrolled 338 students between kindergarten and grade 8.

=== Power plant ===
The Rivesville Power Plant was built by Monongahela Power and Railway Company in 1919 and is currently operated by Allegheny Energy. Unit 5, installed in 1944 had a power output of 48 megawatts; Unit 6, installed in 1951, was 94 megawatts. The plant used open loop cooling, drawing up to 69.8 million gallons per day of cooling water from the Monongahela River. The coal stockpile at the plant had a capacity of 50,000 tons, and coal was delivered by barge. Earlier, coal was delivered by rail. The plant was connected to the grid by 138Kv transmission lines. In the mid 1970s, this was the first commercial power plant to use fluidized bed combustion to fire its boilers. As of 2007, this power plant employed 33 people. New environmental regulations forced the company to shut down the plant in 2012, along with two others elsewhere in the state.

=== Coal mining ===
About the only area around Rivesville where the coal has not been mined out is directly under the older portion of the town and under the riverbed. Consolidation Coal Company Mine No. 97 was in the Pittsburgh coal seam around 100 feet below the level of the riverbed. This mine operated between 1922 and 1954, with a peak production of 670408 tons per year. The coal seam itself is 6 to 8 feet thick. The number 97 Hoist Shaft was directly west of the westernmost corner of the Power Plant, with the hoisting engines to the north across the tracks. Consol. Mine No. 24 was directly across the river, with its shaft in the company town of Montana Mines, and in 1943, plans were filed to connect these mines with an under-river crossing. In 1934, Consol. No. 97 employed 412 men, all of whom were UMWA members. The daily wage ranged from $6.37 for loaders to $9.29 for cutters.

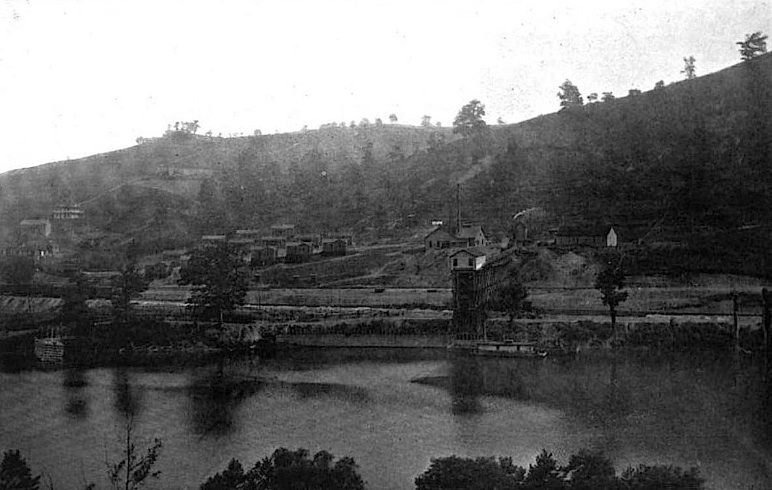
The Parker Run Coal & Coke Co. Mine at Rivesville, circa 1913.

Other mines in the area exploited the shallower Sewickley Coal Seam, largely above the river level to the north and east. Between 1901 and 1913, for example, the Parker Run Coal and Coke Company operated a mine just east of Rivesville, shipping coal by rail and barge. In 1910, this mine employed 60 miners. In 1913, it employed 10 laborers and 25 miners to take 500 tons of coal a day. The coal in this seam was over 6 feet thick, but higher in sulfur than the Pittsburgh seam. Mines in the Sewickley seam were opened earlier and mined out earlier than the mines in the Pittsburgh Seam.

In 1913, the Monongahela Valley Traction Company had a mine in the even shallower Waynesburg coal seam about a mile southwest of Rivesville near Dakota. This coal seam was about 5 feet thick, including an intermediate shale bed one foot thick. By 1921, Monongahela Traction had opened a second mine in the area near Baxter, about a mile up Paw Paw creek. As of 1921, other mines listed as being in Rivesville included the Rivesville Coal Company's Hood Mine, the Winfield Coal Company's River Side Mine, and the Virginia & Pittsburgh Coal & Coke Co.'s Morgan mine.

== Notable person ==
- Harrison C. Summers, WWII hero

== Popular culture ==
- Scenes in the film Feast of the Seven Fishes were filmed in Rivesville.
