= Lemuel Chenoweth =

American architect

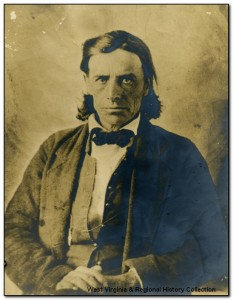
Lemuel Chenoweth (1811-1887), celebrated West Virginia bridge-builder

Lemuel Chenoweth (25 June 1811—26 August 1887) was a carpenter, legislator and self-taught architect. He is best known as one of 19th century America's master covered bridge builders.

Chenoweth and his brother Eli constructed 20 bridges, most during the 1840s and 1850s, most of them covered, on four western Virginia turnpikes, notably on the Staunton-Parkersburg Turnpike system in what is now West Virginia.

== Biography ==
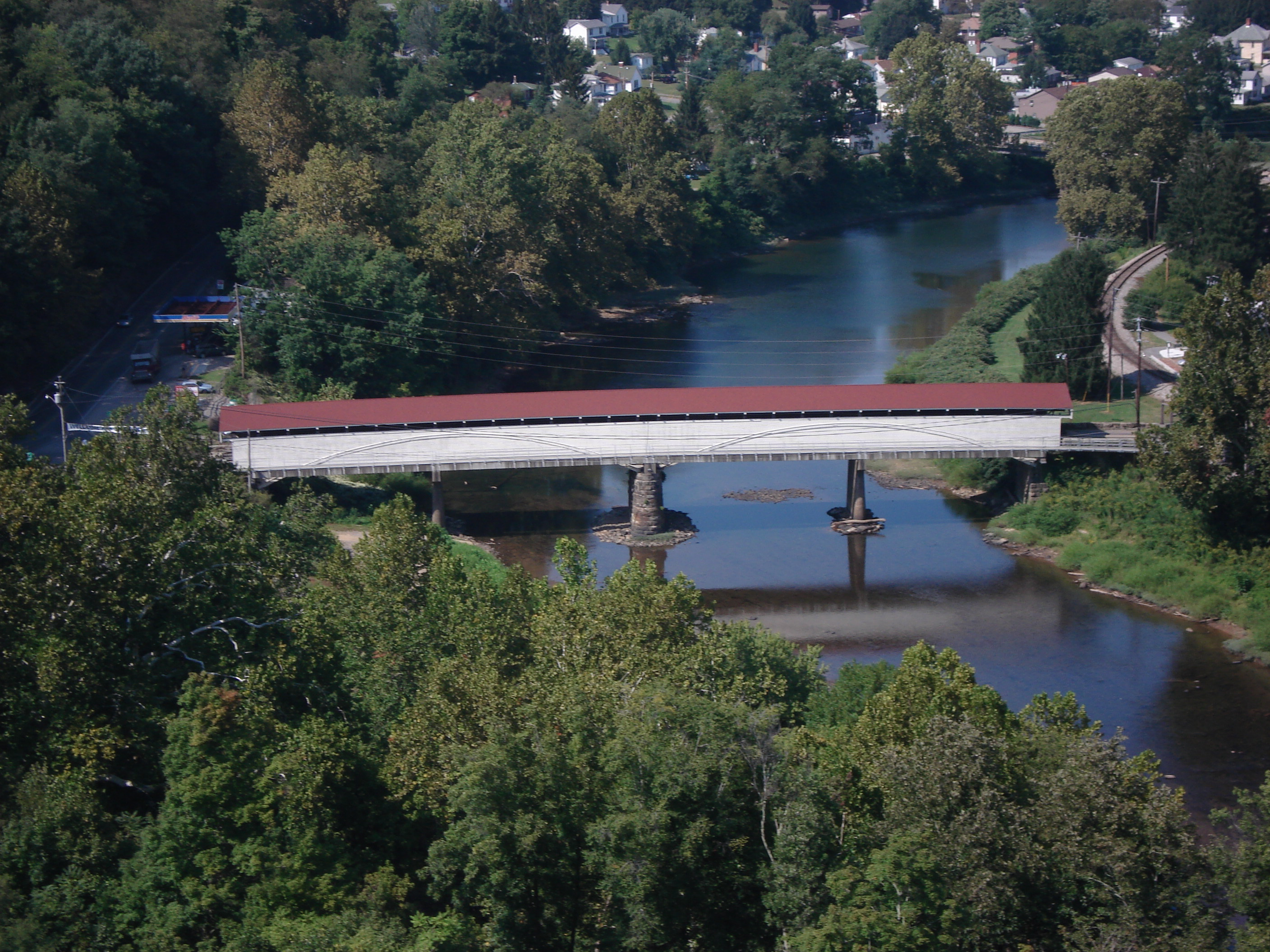
Philippi Covered Bridge (1852)

Chenoweth was born, lived and died in Randolph County, Virginia (later West Virginia). In his youth, Chenoweth built churches, houses, sideboards, poster beds, buggies, wagons, a model of a reverse-cutting sawmill, and even made dominoes.

Chenoweth married Nancy Ann Hart (1821–1912), the great-granddaughter of Declaration of Independence signer John Hart, on June 23, 1836. They had thirteen children. Their first-born son, Joseph Hart Chenoweth (1837–1862), served as a major in the Confederate States Army and died during the Battle of Port Republic. Second-born son, John I. Chenoweth (1838–1857), died while working on the Buckhannon Covered Bridge. Their daughter Harriet Elizabeth Chenoweth (1842–1923) married Union soldier Thomas Jefferson Edwards. Their fourth son, Zachary Taylor Chenoweth (1847–1895), also served in the Confederate States Army.

Chenoweth became an associate of surveyor James Harvey Logan and by extension Claudius Crozet (1789–1864), a noted French-born civil engineer who oversaw the design and construction of Virginia's transportation infrastructure of turnpikes, canals, and roads with funding by the Virginia Board of Public Works and the General Assembly of Virginia prior to the American Civil War (1861-1865). He was also strongly influenced by the bridge framing system developed in 1817 by Theodore Burr (1771–1822) — the Burr arch-truss structural design — which improved bridge strength dramatically.

Chenoweth died in his home and was buried in the Beverly Cemetery.

== Bridge-building career ==
Chenoweth is attributed to the construction of bridges between 1841 and 1861. His final bridge projects were built during the Civil War years, notably in 1861. It is a popular story that in 1850, Chenoweth brought a scale model covered bridge to the Virginia Board of Public Works in Richmond where, in demonstration of its simple design, he put the model between two chairs and stood upon it to showcase its strength. The model's structural integrity earned him construction contracts.

The Beverly Covered Bridge is Chenoweth's earliest built bridge (1846). In the fashion of his later bridges, the Beverly Covered Bridge followed a Burr and kingpost truss design, and spanned approximately 130 feet (40 m). The original bridge was burned by Confederate General Thomas Rosser (1836–1910) on January 11, 1865, and was rebuilt in 1872.

Chenoweth's best-known surviving bridge is the Philippi Covered Bridge (1852) spanning the Tygart Valley River and carrying U.S. Route 250 in Philippi. It is an outstanding example of a modified Burr truss bridge with two spans totaling 308 feet (94 m). It is also the only covered bridge in the United States currently incorporated into the national primary highway system, although it has been extensively reinforced and reconstructed.

The only other Chenoweth covered bridge to survive to the present day is located at Barrackville in Marion County. Several homes and the Huttonsville Presbyterian Church in Huttonsville are also among Chenoweth's extant creations.

== Legacy ==
The Lemuel Chenoweth House Museum operates in the post and beam house that Chenoweth built for himself in Beverly in 1856.

Chenoweth is credited with constructing the Tygart Valley Presbyterian Church in Huttonsville, West Virginia, in 1868.

Chenoweth's life, bridge-building career, and the surrounding history of Randolph County is published in the book Bridging the Gaps by Randy Allen.

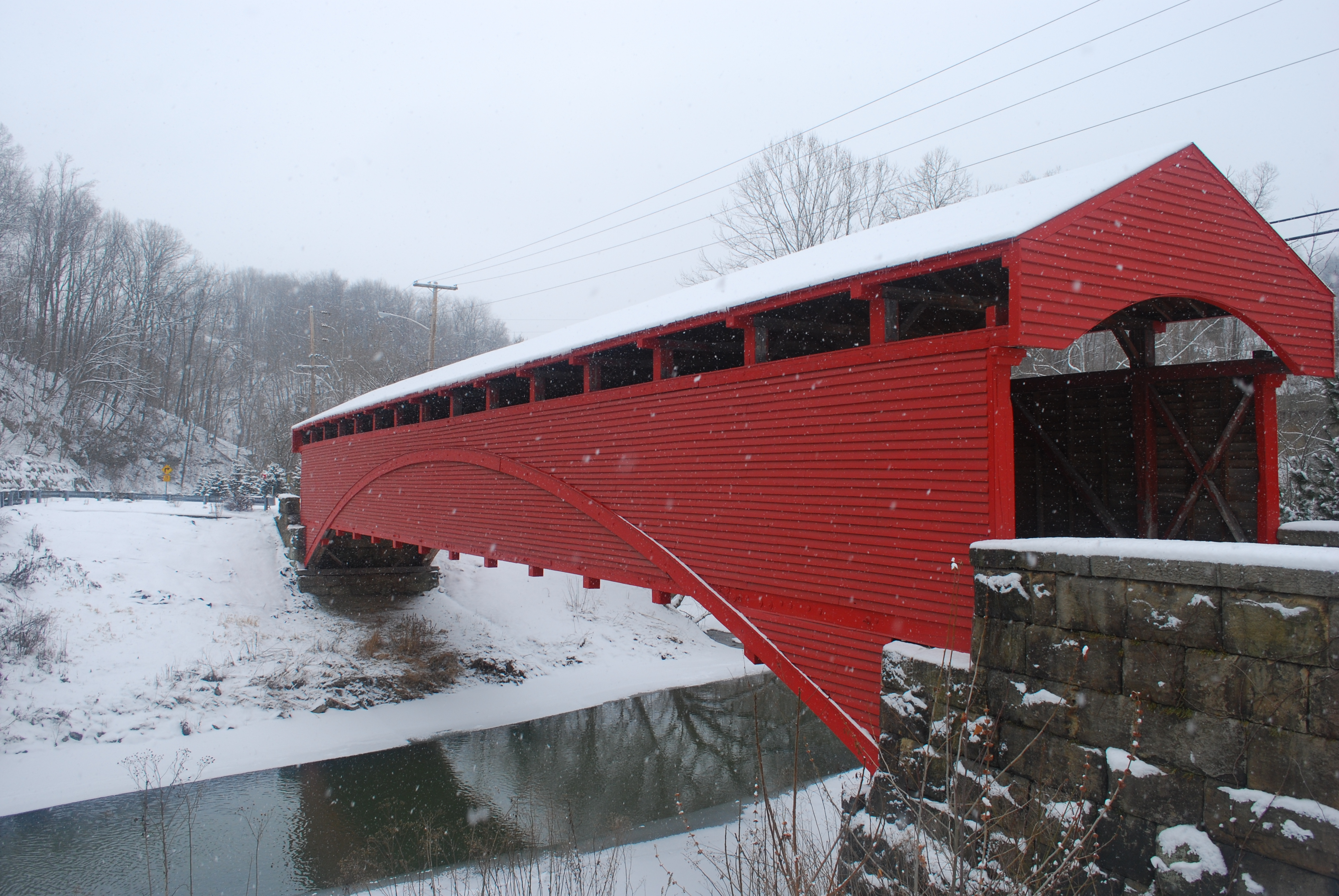
Barrackville Covered Bridge (1853)

== List of Chenoweth bridges ==
- Beverly Covered Bridge, 1846, across the Tygart Valley River; Chenoweth's first bridge (burnt by Gen. Rosser, 1865; rebuilt by Chenoweth 1872; destroyed again post-1952).
- North Fork Hughes River Bridge, 1847, Wirt County.
- South Fork Hughes River Bridge, 1847, Richtie County; probable relation to Berea Covered Bridge (destroyed).
- Middle Fork Covered Bridge, 1848, across Middle Fork River (destroyed).
- Leading Creek Bridge, Leadsville, 1849.
- ????? Bridge, 1851–52, across the West Fork River at Hunsaker's Ferry, near Fairmont (destroyed).
- Philippi Covered Bridge, 1852, across the Tygart Valley River (narrowly averted burning by Gen. Jones, 1863; surviving).
- Paw Paw Creek Covered Bridge, near Grant Town, West Virginia, 185? (destroyed).
- Barrackville Covered Bridge, 1853, across Buffalo Creek (surviving); serviced the Fairmont-Wheeling Turnpike.
- Marlin's Bottom Covered Bridge, 1853, across the Greenbrier River (removed and replaced, 1915).
- Stalnaker/Dailey Bridge, Tygart Valley River, 1853 (burned in Civil War).
- Buckhannon Covered Bridge, 1856; 1872 (rebuilt), across the Buckhannon River (destroyed).
- Files Creek Open Bridge, Beverly, 1858.
- Polk Creek Covered Bridge, Lewis County, 1858.
- Weston Bridge, West Fork, Lewis County, 1858 (rebuilt by Chenoweth).
- Fink's Creek Covered Bridge, Troy, Gilmer County, 1859.
- Huttonsville Bridge, Tygart Valley River, 1859 (Chenoweth provided technical guidance).
- Weston Covered Bridge, 1859, across Stonecoal Creek, Lewis County (destroyed).
- Red Run/Bridge 24, Cheat Mountain, 1861.
- North Fork at Greenbrier Bridge, 1861 (repaired).
- South Fork at Greenbrier Bridge, 1861 (work abandoned due to war).
- Cowpasture and Bullpasture River Bridges, 1861.
- Stillwell Creek Open Bridge, Parkersburg, 18??.

== See also ==
- List of West Virginia covered bridges
