= List of turnpikes in Virginia and West Virginia =

Historic Turnpikes in Virginia and West Virginia

Highway names
- Interstates: Interstate X (I-X)
- US Highways: U.S. Route X (US X)
- State: State Route X (SR X) or Virginia Route X (VA X), West Virginia Route X (WV X)

System links
- Virginia Routes; Interstate; US; Primary; Secondary; Byways; History; HOT lanes

This is a list of turnpike roads, built and operated by nonprofit turnpike trusts or private companies in exchange for the privilege of collecting a toll, in the U.S. states of Virginia and West Virginia, mainly in the 19th century. While most of the roads are now maintained as free public roads, some have been abandoned.

== List ==
Name	Chartered	Routing	Approximate modern designation	Notes
Abb's Valley and Tug's Road Turnpike	February 19, 1850			
Abingdon and Pattonsville Turnpike				
Abingdon and Saltville Turnpike	December 28, 1803	Abingdon - Saltville		
Aldie Turnpike	1878	15 south from Leesburg to Little River Turnpike at Gilberts Corner	Route 15 (Virginia)	Official name of Leesburg and Aldie Turnpike, below.
Alleghany Turnpike	December 31, 1805	Lafayette - East of Christiansburg	U.S. Route 11	Later absorbed into the Southwestern Turnpike
Alleghany and Huntersville Road				Tolled state improvement
Alleghany Mountain Turnpike				
Ashby's Gap Turnpike		Aldie - Ashby's Gap - Berrys	U.S. Route 50	
Augusta Springs Turnpike				
Aurora and Terra Alta Turnpike		Aurora - Terra Alta	Aurora Pike	Was part of the Morgantown, Kingwood and West Union Turnpike
Back Creek Valley Turnpike				
Bath to Shepherdstown Turnpike				
Beaver Creek to Leatherwood Hills Turnpike				
Berkeley and Hampshire Turnpike	March 1, 1851	Martinsburg - Frenchburg	Tuscarora Pike, Hampshire Grade Road, Blue Rock Road, Old Romney Grade (abandoned), WV Route 127, WV Route 29, Old Martinsburg Road	
Berryville Turnpike	1831	Winchester - Berryville - Shenandoah River	VA Route 7	
Berryville and Charles Town Turnpike	March 22, 1847	Berryville - Charles Town	U.S. Route 340 Augustine Avenue	
Beverly and Fairmont Road	1852	Beverly - Elkins - Belington - Philippi - Fairmont	U.S. Route 250, Laurel Mountain Road, U.S. Route 250	Tolled state improvement
Beverly Manor Turnpike				
Big Lick and Fincastle Turnpike				
Black Lick and Plaster Banks Turnpike				
Blue Ridge Canal Turnpike				
Blue Ridge Turnpike	March 25, 1848	East of New Market - Stanley - Fishers Gap - Madison - Gordonsville	U.S. Route 340, U.S. Route 340 Business, Kite Hollow Road, Old Blue Ridge Turnpike, VA Route 231	
Boydton and Petersburg Plank Road		Petersburg - McKenney - South Hill - Boydton; McKenney - Lawrenceville	U.S. Route 1, U.S. Route 58; VA Route 712	
Brandonville and Fishing Creek Turnpike		Pennsylvania - Brandonville - Bruceton Mills - Morgantown - Fairmont	WV Route 26, old WV Route 73, WV Route 857, U.S. Route 19	Became part of the Ohio River and Maryland Turnpike
Brandonville, Kingwood and Evansville Turnpike				See Kingwood and Brandonville Turnpike
Brook Turnpike		Richmond - Solomons Store	Brook Road, U.S. Route 1	
Brown's Gap Turnpike				
Brunswick and Roanoke Plank Road				
Buchanan Turnpike				
Buchanan and Bedford Turnpike		Buchanan - Bedford	VA Route 43	
Buckhannon and Little Kanawha Turnpike	March 15, 1849	Buckhannon - French Creek - Jacksonville	WV Route 4, Beechtown Road, Union Road, Walkersville Arnold Road	
Buford's Gap and Buchanan Turnpike				
Cacapon and North Branch Turnpike				
Capon and North Branch Turnpike		Maryland - Springfield - Capon Bridge	WV Route 28, Springfield Grade Road	
Cedar Creek and Opequon Turnpike	March 24, 1851	Winchester - Marlboro	Cedar Creek Grade	
Charleston and Point Pleasant Turnpike		Charleston - Point Pleasant	WV Route 25, WV Route 62	
Charleston and Ravenswood Turnpike		Charleston - Ripley - Ravenswood	Old U.S. Route 21, Ravenswood-Ripley Road	
Charles Town and Berryville Turnpike	March 22, 1847	Berryville, VA to Charles Town, WV	Route 340 Augustine Ave. (Old Route 340)	
Cheat Mountain Turnpike				
Christiansville and Keysville Plank Road				
Clarksburg and Buckhannon Turnpike		Clarksburg - Buckhannon	WV Route 20	
Clarksburg and Philippi Turnpike		Clarksburg - Philippi	Old Philippi Pike, Cherry Hill Road	
Clarksburg and Weston Turnpike				
Clarksburg and Wheeling Turnpike				
Columbia Turnpike				
Consolidated Turnpike of Norfolk				
Covington to Huntersville Turnpike				
Cranberry Summit and Brandonville Turnpike				
Cross Roads and Summit Point Turnpike	29 March 1851	Summit Point WV - Route 340	Leetown Road S. of Summit Point	
Cumberland Road				Tolled state improvement
Cumberland Gap Turnpike				
Danville and Wytheville Turnpike				
Dunkard Creek Turnpike		Morgantown - Blacksville - Burton	WV Route 100, WV Route 7	
East River and Princeton Turnpike				
El Dorado Turnpike				
Elk River Turnpike				
Estillville Turnpike				
Estillville and Nickelville Turnpike				
Fairfax Turnpike				
Fairfax and Georgetown Turnpike				
Fairmont and Wheeling Turnpike		Grafton - Fairmont - Mannington - Hundred - Cameron - Wheeling	WV Route 310, U.S. Route 250, WV Route 88	Tolled state improvement
Falls Bridge Turnpike		District of Columbia (Georgetown and Leesburg Turnpike) - Langley - Great Falls - Dranesville		
Fancy Gap Road	January 17, 1848	North Carolina - Fancy Gap - Hillsville - Max Meadows	U.S. Route 52, VA Route 121	Tolled state improvement
Farmville and Buckingham Plank Road		Farmville - Buckingham	Plank Road, VA Route 633	
Fauquier and Alexandria Turnpike	1808	Warrenton - Centreville - Fairfax	U.S. Route 29	Eastern terminus was on the Little River Turnpike, near Fairfax Courthouse.
Fetterman and Cove Turnpike				
Fincastle and Blue Ridge Turnpike		Fincastle - Montvale	Blue Ridge Turnpike, Bethel Road, abandoned portion over Black Horse Gap	
Fincastle and Covington Turnpike	March 24, 1851	Fincastle - Covington (Botetourt County Seat to Alleghany County Seat)	U.S. Route 220, Old Fincastle Road, Mount Moriah Road, Sugar Tree Hollow Road, Craig Creek Road, Roaring Run Road, Rich Patch Road, Watahala Lane, Middle Mountain Road	NW Botetourt Civil War mapRichmond Daily Times 17Mar1851 Fincastle and Covington Turnpike Company records, 1851-1867
Floyd Courthouse and Hillsville Road	February 1850	Endicott - Floyd - Hillsville	Shooting Creek Road, U.S. Route 221	Tolled state improvement
Franklin and Botetourt Turnpike				
Franklin and Circleville Turnpike				
Fredericksburg and Valley Plank Road		Fredericksburg - Orange	VA Route 3, VA Route 20	
Free Turnpike				
Front Royal Turnpike	March 27, 1848	Winchester - Front Royal	U.S. Route 522	
Front Royal and Gaines' Crossroads Turnpike		Front Royal - east of Washington	U.S. Route 522, Ben Venue Road	
Giles, Fayette and Kanawha Turnpike		Pearisburg - Rich Creek - Red Sulphur Springs - Packs Ferry - Beckley - Oak Hill - Fayetteville - Kanawha Falls - South Charleston	U.S. Route 460, U.S. Route 219, WV Route 12, Seminole Road, abandoned portion along the New River, Leatherwood Road, WV Route 3, U.S. Route 19, WV Route 16, Jenkins Branch Road, WV Route 61	
Gilmer and Braxton Turnpike				
Gilmer, Ripley and Ohio Turnpike				
Glade Creek and Cloverdale Turnpike				
Glenville, Ripley and Ohio Turnpike		Linn - Glenville - Arnoldsburg - Spencer - Ripley - Ripley Landing	U.S. Route 33, WV Route 62	
Gnatty Creek and West Union Turnpike				
Gooney Manor Turnpike				
Goose Creek and Little River Turnpike				
Grave Creek and Pennsylvania State Line Turnpike				
Gravelly Springs Turnpike				
Guyandotte and Charleston Turnpike		Charleston - Saint Albans - Guyandotte	Kanawha Turnpike, U.S. Route 60	
Hampshire and Morgan Turnpike	February 24, 1851			
Hardy and Randolph Turnpike				
Hardy and Winchester Turnpike	March 8, 1846	Moorefield - Wardensville - west of Winchester; branch to Capon Springs	WV Route 55, VA Route 55, Wardensville Grade	
Harrisville Turnpike				
Hazel River Turnpike				
Hedgesville and Potomac Turnpike	1851			
Hillsborough and Harper's Ferry Turnpike	1851			
Holliday's Cove Turnpike				
Holliday's Cove and New Cumberland Turnpike				
Hot Springs and Clifton Forge Turnpike				
Howardsville and Rockfish Turnpike		Howardsville - Stuarts Draft - Middlebrook	Howardsville Turnpike, VA Route 6, Chapel Hollow Road, Old Howardsville Turnpike, Howardsville Turnpike, U.S. Route 340, Howardsville Road	
Huntersville and Lewisburg Turnpike				
Huntersville and Monterey Turnpike				
Huntersville and Parkersburg Turnpike				
Huntersville and Warm Springs Turnpike		Huntersville - Warm Springs	WV Route 39, VA Route 39	
Huttonsville and Huntersville Road		Huttonsville - Huntersville	U.S. Route 219, WV Route 39	Tolled state improvement
Indian Creek Turnpike	February 24, 1854			
Indian River Turnpike and Toll Bridge				
Jackson's River Turnpike				
Jacksonville and Bent Mountain Turnpike	March 31, 1848	Floyd - Cave Spring	U.S. Route 221	
Jacksonville and Christiansburg Turnpike	March 1851	Floyd - Christiansburg	Christians Burg Pike, Pilot Road	
Jacksonville and Cove Springs Turnpike				
James River and Kanawha Turnpike		Buchanan - Clifton Forge - Covington - White Sulphur Springs - Lewisburg - Rainelle - Gauley Bridge - Charleston	VA Route 43, U.S. Route 220, U.S. Route 60	
Jane Lew and Upshur Turnpike				
Jefferson and Frederick Turnpike	1851			
Jeffersonville, Marion and Rye Valley Turnpike	March 26, 1860	Tazewell - Marion - Sugar Grove	VA Route 16	
Jonesville and Little Stone Gap Turnpike		Jonesville - Wise		
Jordan's Furnace and Rockbridge Turnpike				
Junction Valley Turnpike	March 17, 1849	Buchanan - Lexington - Staunton	U.S. Route 11, Plank Road, U.S. Route 11	
Kanawha Turnpike				
Kentucky and Tazewell Courthouse Turnpike		Tazewell - Grundy		
Kingwood and Brandonville Turnpike		Fellowsville - Kingwood - Bruceton Mills	WV Route 26	Originally named the Brandonville, Kingwood and Evansville Turnpike
Kingwood and Terra Alta Turnpike		Kingwood - Terra Alta	WV Route 7	Was part of the Morgantown, Kingwood and West Union Turnpike
Kingwood and West Union Turnpike				See Morgantown, Kingwood and West Union Turnpike
Lafayette and English's Ferry Turnpike				
Leading Creek and Buffalo Turnpike		Gilman, WV	Co.Rt.1 Leading Crk. Rd.	
Leeds Manor Turnpike				
Leesburg Turnpike		Leesburg - Dranesville - District of Columbia (Alexandria and Leesburg Turnpike)	VA Route 7	
Leesburg and Aldie Turnpike	1878	Leesburg - Gilberts Corner	Route 15	See Aldie Turnpike, above.
Leesburg and Georgetown Turnpike				
Leesburg to Point of Rocks Turnpike	1853	Leesburg - Point of Rocks	Route 15	
Leesburg and Snicker's Gap Turnpike				
Letart Falls and West Columbia Turnpike				
Lewisburg and Blue Sulphur Springs Turnpike				
Lewiston Plank Road	March 21, 1853	Burkeville - Lunenburg	Lewiston Plank Road, VA Route 49	
Lexington and Covington Turnpike				
Lexington and Richmond Turnpike				
Little River Turnpike	January 28, 1802	Alexandria - Fairfax - Aldie		
Logan, Raleigh and Monroe Turnpike				
Loudoun and Berlin Turnpike	1852	Just East of Purcellville - Lovettsville - Brunswick	Route 287, Berlin Tpke	
Lunenburg Plank Road	May 25, 1852	Blackstone - Kenbridge - Wattsboro	VA Route 40, Plank Road	
Luray and Front Royal Turnpike	1851			
Luray to Staunton Turnpike				
Lynchburg and Buffalo Springs Turnpike				
Lynchburg to Lexington Turnpike		Lynchburg - Glasgow - Lexington	U.S. Route 501, River Road, Millers Landing Lane, Forge Road, Wesley Chapel Road, U.S. Route 60	
Lynchburg and Salem Turnpike		Lynchburg - Bedford - Roanoke - Salem	U.S. Route 460, Salem Turnpike	
Manassa's Gap Turnpike				
Manchester Turnpike		Manchester - Midlothian	U.S. Route 60	
Manchester and Petersburg Turnpike		Manchester - Petersburg	U.S. Route 1	
Marlin's Bottom and Lewisburg Turnpike				
Marshall and Ohio Turnpike				
Martinsburg and Potomac Turnpike	1849	Martinsburg - Maryland	U.S. Route 11	
Martinsburg and Winchester Turnpike	March 24, 1848	Martinsburg - Winchester	U.S. Route 11	
Maryland and Ohio Turnpike				
Marysville Plank Road		Charlotte Court House - Drakes Branch	VA Route 47	
Mechanicsburg and Wythe Turnpike				
Mechanicsville Turnpike		Richmond - Mechanicsville	U.S. Route 360	
Middle Turnpike				
Middlebrook and Brownsburg Turnpike		Staunton - Middlebrook - Brownsburg - Lexington	VA Route 252, VA Route 39	
Middleburg to Strasburg Turnpike				
Middlefork Turnpike				
Middleway and Gerardstown Turnpike	18 February 1854	Partially Abandoned	Route 51	
Millboro and Carr's Creek Turnpike				
Millwood and Berryville Turnpike				
Moorefield and Alleghany Turnpike				
Moorefield and North Branch Turnpike	April 7, 1838	Green Spring - Springfield - Romney - Moorefield	Green Spring Road (County Route 1), Harriott-Wappocomo Road (County Route 28/15), WV Route 28	Succeeded by the North and South Branches Turnpike in 1868.
Morgan and Frederick Turnpike	1851			
Morgan and Hampshire Turnpike				
Morgantown and Beverly Road		Pennsylvania - Collins Ferry - Morgantown - Evansville - Belington	Fort Martin Road, Collins Ferry Road, U.S. Route 119, Brewer Road, Independence-Gladesville Road, Old Evansville Pike, WV Route 92	Tolled state improvement
Morgantown and Bridgeport Turnpike		Pennsylvania - Morgantown - Fairmont - Bridgeport - Clarksburg	WV Route 857, old WV Route 73, U.S. Route 50	
Morgantown and Kingwood Turnpike		Morgantown - Reedsville - Kingwood	Old Kingwood Pike, WV Route 7	Was part of the Morgantown, Kingwood and West Union Turnpike
Morgantown, Kingwood and West Union Turnpike		Morgantown - Reedsville - Kingwood - Terra Alta - Aurora	Old Kingwood Pike, WV Route 7, Aurora Pike	Originally the Kingwood and West Union Turnpike; later split into the Aurora and Terra Alta Turnpike, Kingwood and Terra Alta Turnpike, and Morgantown and Kingwood Turnpike
Morgantown to Smythfield Turnpike				
Mount Jackson and Howards Lick Turnpike				
Mountain Lake and Salt Sulphur Springs Turnpike				
National Turnpike		Ohio - Wheeling - Pennsylvania	U.S. Route 40	
Natural Bridge Turnpike				
New Creek and Hardy Turnpike				
New London and Rocky Mount Turnpike				
New Manchester Turnpike				
New Market to Richmond Turnpike				
New Market and Sperryville Turnpike	1851	New Market - Sperryville	U.S. Route 211	
Newark Turnpike				
Norfolk and Princess Anne Turnpike				
North Fork Turnpike				
North Frederick Turnpike	February 24, 1851	Winchester - Berkeley Springs - Maryland	U.S. Route 522	
North River Turnpike	1851			
Northwestern Turnpike	March 3, 1834	Winchester - Capon Bridge - Romney - Grafton - Bridgeport - Clarksburg - West Union - Parkersburg	U.S. Route 50	Tolled state improvement
Ohio River and Maryland Turnpike		Pennsylvania - Brandonville - Bruceton Mills - Morgantown - Fairmont - Mannington - Pine Grove - New Martinsville	WV Route 26, old WV Route 73, WV Route 857, U.S. Route 19, U.S. Route 250, Price Fork Road, WV Route 20	Tolled state improvement
Parkersburg to Charleston Turnpike				
Parkersburg and Elizabethtown Turnpike				
Patterson's Creek Valley Turnpike				
Pennsylvania, Beverly and Morgantown Turnpike				See Morgantown and Beverly Turnpike
Petersburg and Jerusalem Plank Road		Petersburg - Courtland	U.S. Route 301, VA Route 35	
Pittsylvania, Franklin and Botetourt Turnpike		Danville - Callands - Rocky Mount - Roanoke - Fincastle	VA Route 41, Sago Road, Smith Road, Danville Turnpike, Chestnut Mountain Road, Colonial Turnpike, Sontag Road, U.S. Route 220, Naff Road, Merriman Road, Starkey Road, Franklin Road, Old Mountain Road, U.S. Route 220	
Pittsylvania and Lynchburg Turnpike		Danville - Chatham - Lynchburg	U.S. Route 29, Chalk Level Road, Telegraph Road, Wards Road, U.S. Route 29	
Pleasant Valley and Tunnelton Turnpike				
Potomac Turnpike	1851			
Price's Turnpike and Cumberland Gap Road	March 5, 1834	Cumberland Gap - Tazewell - Bluefield - Narrows - Pearisburg - New Castle - Barbours Creek	College Estates Road, VA Route 91, U.S. Route 19, WV Route 112, old U.S. Route 460, VA Route 100, U.S. Route 460, VA Route 42, VA Route 615	Tolled state improvement
Princeton and Red Sulphur Turnpike		Princeton - Athens - Hill Top - Shanklins Ferry - Ballard	WV Route 20, Red Sulphur Turnpike, Laurel Creek Road, abandoned portion, Shanklins Ferry Crossing, Ballard Road	
Pulaski and Giles Turnpike	February 9, 1850	Newbern - Pearisburg	Virginia State Route 100, Newbern Road	
Raleigh and Grayson Turnpike		Beckley - Princeton - Bluefield - Bland - Wytheville - Independence	U.S. Route 19, U.S. Route 52, Virginia State Road 603 (Cove Road) - Wythe County, Virginia, U.S. Route 21	Remnants of the old turnpike road have been used in the present day. SR 603 (Cove Road) changes from asphalt to gravel surface when it intersects the Wythe/Bland line at Little Walker Mountain. A large abandoned segment descends Big Walker Mountain from Bland and is congruent with SR 653 (Raleigh-Grayson Turnpike) in downtown Bland. Another abandoned segment carried the original alignment of U.S. 52 north of Bland, skirting the ridge of Hogback Mountain from the gap with Brushy Mountain into Bastian until the construction of Interstate 77, and U.S. 52 was shifted west and parallel to Interstate 77.
Raleigh and Wythe Line Turnpike	March 3, 1860			
Ravenswood and Reedy Creek Turnpike				
Ravenswood and Spencer Turnpike		Spencer - Reedy - Sandyville - Ravenswood	WV Route 14, Liverpool Road, U.S. Route 33	
Red and Blue Sulphur Springs Turnpike		Red Sulphur Springs - Alderson - Blue Sulphur Springs		
Reedy and Harrisville Turnpike				
Rich Mountain Turnpike				
Rich Patch Turnpike	March 14,1849	Red Sweet Springs (Sweet Chalybeate Springs) - Rich Patch - pt near Shirkey's Mill in Bot. County		Rich Patch Turnpike Company records, 1849-1853
Richlands and Kentucky Line Road	March 8, 1847	Richlands - Kentucky	U.S. Route 460	Tolled state improvement
Richmond Turnpike	January 5, 1804	Richmond - Short Pump	U.S. Route 250	
Richmond and Charlottesville Turnpike				
Richmond and Columbia Turnpike	January 24, 1804	Richmond - Goochland	VA Route 6	
Richmond and Henrico Turnpike				
Richmond and Osborne Turnpike		Richmond - Osborne Landing	Osborne Turnpike	
Richmond, Williamsburg and Central Turnpike				
Riffle's Run to Greenbrier River Turnpike				
Ritchie and Gilmer Turnpike				
Rivanna and Rockfish Gap Turnpike		Charlottesville - Rockfish Gap	U.S. Route 250	
Rockfish River to Valley Road Turnpike				
Rockingham Turnpike				
Rocky Mount Turnpike		Lynchburg - Rocky Mount - Floyd		
Russell Old Courthouse and Abingdon Turnpike				
Russell and Washington Turnpike				
Salem and Harrisville Turnpike				
Salem and New Castle Turnpike		Starkey Park - Salem - New Castle	Merriman Road, VA Route 419, U.S. Route 11, VA Route 311	
Salem and Orleans Turnpike				
Salem and Pepper's Ferry Turnpike		Salem - Blacksburg - Peppers Ferry	U.S. Route 11, Northfork Road, Cedar Run Road, VA Route 412, Prices Fork Road, VA Route 114	Truncated from Salem to Lafayette when the Southwestern Turnpike was built over it
Salem Station and Rappahannock Turnpike				
Salt and Red Sulphur Springs Turnpike				
Saltville and Laurel Turnpike				
Sandy River Turnpike				
Shepherdstown and Smithfield Turnpike	31 January 1816	Old Route 340 - Shepherdstown	Halltown Road - Route 230	
Shinnston Turnpike				
Shinnston and Middlebourne Turnpike				
Sinking Creek and Craig's Creek Turnpike				
Sir John's Run Turnpike				
Sistersville and Salem Road				Tolled state improvement
Smithfield, Charles Town and Harper's Ferry Turnpike	18 February 1830	Middleway - Charles Town - Harpers Ferry	Old Middleway Pike, Middleway Pike, Washington Street, Sommerset Boulevard, Halltown Road, Shipley School Road, Allstadts Hill Road, Columbia Street	
Smyth Courthouse and Plaster Banks Turnpike				
Snicker's Gap Turnpike		Aldie - Snicker's Gap - Shenandoah River		
Southwestern Turnpike	January 28, 1846	Buchanan - Cloverdale - Salem - Christiansburg - Newbern - Wytheville - Marion - Abingdon - Bristol	U.S. Route 11, VA Route 117, U.S. Route 460, U.S. Route 11	Tolled state improvement
Sperryville and Rappahannock Turnpike		Sperryville - Washington - Warrenton	U.S. Route 211	
Sperryville to Swift Run Gap Turnpike				
St. Mary's Turnpike				
Staunton to Callaghan's Turnpike				
Staunton and James River Turnpike	March 8, 1824	Staunton - Waynesboro - Scottsville	U.S. Route 250, Plank Road, VA Route 20	
Staunton and Parkersburg Road		Staunton - Monterey - Beverly - Buckhannon - Weston - Parkersburg	VA Route 254, Old Parkersburg Turnpike, U.S. Route 250, Rich Mountain Road, WV Route 151, U.S. Route 33, WV Route 47	Tolled state improvement
Strasburg and Capon Turnpike				
Summersville and Slaven Cabin Turnpike				
Sweet and Salt Sulphur Springs Turnpike				
Sweet Springs and Price's Mountain Turnpike		Fincastle - Sweet Springs	Grove Hill Road, VA Route 611, Potts Mountain Road, abandoned portion across the state line, McDaniel Road	
Swift Run Gap Turnpike		Fredericksburg - Orange - Stanardsville - Swift Run Gap - Elkton	VA Route 3, VA Route 20, Scuffletown Road, Fredericksburg Road, U.S. Route 33	Part of the road was sold to the Fredericksburg and Valley Plank Road
Tazewell Courthouse and Fancy Gap Road	March 17, 1849	Tazewell - Wytheville	The turnpike traveled east on what is currently Virginia State Route 61 (SR 61) from Tazewell to SR 623, which it turned onto. It then followed a windy crossing into Burke's Garden, and then exited on a much narrower, steeper, and windier section until it reached SR 42. The turnpike then followed SR 42 briefly before moving off onto SR 621 (Old Mountain Road). The turnpike followed this onto U.S. Route 52 (US 52; Stoney Fork Road), and followed this into Wytheville. The routing south of Wytheville is unclear, perhaps following Peppers Ferry Road to Max Meadows, and then following SR 121 (Max Meadows Road) south onto US 52 to Fancy Gap.	The Tazewell Courthouse and Fancy Gap Turnpike, along with the Price's Turnpike and Cumberland Gap Road, was constructed through Tazewell County from 1848 to 1852. It extended from Tazewell, through Burke's Garden and Wytheville, to Fancy Gap. After the Civil War, the road served as part of a stagecoach route from the Great Lakes to the South. In 1885, New York University geology professor John J. Stevenson praised the road's engineering, calling it "...remarkably good..." despite the obstacle of Clinch Mountain.
Tazewell Courthouse and Kentucky Turnpike			Baptist Valley Road	
Tazewell Courthouse and Richlands Road		Tazewell - Richlands		Tolled state improvement
Tazewell Courthouse and Saltville Turnpike	March 10, 1851	Tazewell - Saltville		
Teay's Valley and Gallipolis Turnpike				
Thornton's Gap Turnpike				
Tunnelton and Ices Ferry Turnpike				
Tye River and Blue Ridge Turnpike				
Upperville and Manassas Gap Plank Road				
Valley Turnpike	March 24, 1838	Winchester - Harrisonburg - Staunton		
Walker's Creek and Holston Turnpike				
Warm Springs to Bull Pasture River Turnpike				
Warm Springs and Harrisonburg Turnpike	January 29, 1830	Harrisonburg - Bridgewater - Warm Springs	VA Route 42, Mossy Creek Road, Freemason Run Road, Stribling Springs Road, U.S. Route 250, Deerfield Valley Road, VA Route 39	
Warm Springs, Huntersville and Romney Turnpike				
Warm Springs Mountain Turnpike				
Warrenton to New Market Turnpike				
Warrenton to Occoquan Turnpike				
Warrenton and Rappahannock Turnpike				
Washington and Alexandria Turnpike			U.S. Route 1; Jefferson Davis Highway	
Wellsburg Turnpike				
Wellsburg and Bethany Turnpike		Wellsburg - Bethany	WV Route 67	
Wellsburg and Washington Turnpike		Wellsburg - Pennsylvania	WV Route 27	
Welltown Turnpike		Welltown - north of Winchester	Welltown Road	Managed by the Winchester and Martinsburg Turnpike
West Milford and New Salem Turnpike				
West Union Turnpike				
Westham Turnpike		Richmond - Westham	VA Route 147	
Weston and Fairmont Turnpike		Weston - Clarksburg - Fairmont	U.S. Route 19, Lost Creek Road, U.S. Route 19	
Weston and Gauley Bridge Turnpike				
Weston and West Union Turnpike				
Wheeling, West Liberty and Bethany Turnpike		Wheeling - West Liberty - Bethany	WV Route 88	
White and Salt Sulphur Springs Turnpike		Caldwell - Salt Sulphur Springs	WV Route 63, U.S. Route 219	
Williamsport Turnpike				
Wilson Creek and South Fork Turnpike				
Winchester to Bath Turnpike				
Winchester and Berkeley Springs Turnpike				
Winchester and Berry's Ferry Turnpike		Winchester - Millwood - Berrys	U.S. Route 50	
Winchester and Hardy Turnpike				
Winfield and Thompsonville Turnpike				
Wolf Creek Turnpike	May 11, 1852			
Wythe Turnpike				
Wytheville and Grayson Turnpike				
