= Capon and North Branch Turnpike =

19th-century turnpike in the United States

The Capon and North Branch Turnpike (also known as the Cacapon and North Branch Turnpike) was a 19th-century turnpike in Hampshire County in the U.S. state of Virginia (now West Virginia). The turnpike facilitated increased communication and transportation between Cumberland, Maryland and Winchester, Virginia via the Northwestern Turnpike in Capon Bridge, West Virginia. As of July 2010, the Capon and North Branch Turnpike's original route is made up of segments of West Virginia Route 28, Springfield Pike (County Route 3), Slanesville Pike (County Route 3), and Cold Stream Road (County Routes 45/20 and 15).

== History ==
=== Establishment and early history ===
The Capon and North Branch Turnpike was built in 1842. The turnpike connected Cumberland, Maryland on the North Branch Potomac River and Capon Bridge on the Cacapon River and the Northwestern Turnpike (currently U.S. Route 50). The Capon and North Branch Turnpike passed through the communities of Frankfort (currently Fort Ashby), Springfield, Millesons Mill, Higginsville, Slanesville, North River Mills, and Cold Stream.

The turnpike was built by subscription, two fifths of the stock subscribed by the Commonwealth of Virginia and the other by private parties.

=== Further expansions ===
In 1852, a turnpike was constructed from a point near Charles Taylor's farm on the Capon and North Branch Turnpike to a point at French's Store (later known as South Branch Depot) on the Potomac River near the confluence of the North and South Branches. Another connecting turnpike was constructed from Green Spring on the North Branch Potomac River to Moorefield was built by a stock company around 1850 with the Commonwealth of Virginia taking two fifths of the stock. This turnpike was known as the Moorefield and North Branch Turnpike.

During an extra session of the Virginia House of Delegates in 1861, it passed Bill No. 89: "A bill to transfer the Capon and North branch turnpike to the county court of Hampshire."

== See also ==
- List of turnpikes in Virginia and West Virginia
