= Buffalo Creek (Monongahela River tributary) =

River in West Virginia, United States

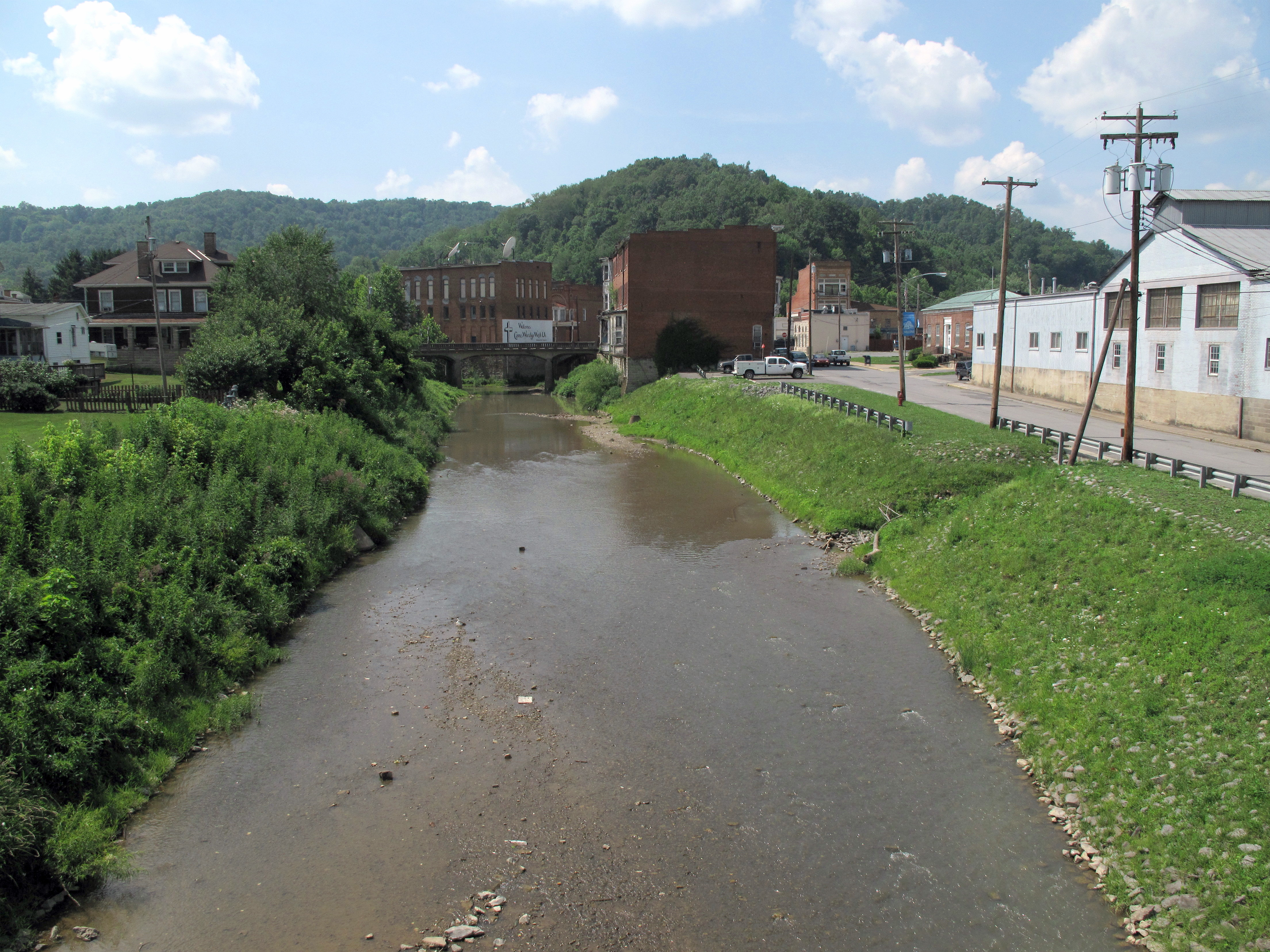
- Buffalo Creek in Mannington in 2010

- Location of the mouth of Buffalo Creek in Fairmont, West Virginia

Location
- Country: United States
- State: West Virginia
- County: Marion

Physical characteristics
- Source
  - location: near Brink
  - coordinates: 39.5395288°N 80.4895332°W
  - elevation: 1,355 ft (413 m)
- Mouth: Monongahela River
  - location: Fairmont
  - coordinates: 39.4956401°N 80.1250769°W
  - elevation: 860 ft (260 m)
- Length: 30.2 mi (48.6 km)
- Basin size: 125 mi^{2} (320 km^{2})
- Discharge
  - location: Barrackville
  - minimum: 0 cu ft/s (0 m^{3}/s)
  - maximum: 10,400 cu ft/s (290 m^{3}/s)

Basin features
- Tributaries
  - left: Pyles Fork

Buffalo Creek is a tributary of the Monongahela River, 30.2 miles (48.6 km) long, in northern West Virginia, in the United States. Via the Monongahela and Ohio rivers, it is part of the watershed of the Mississippi River, draining an area of 125 square miles (320 km^{2}) on the unglaciated portion of the Allegheny Plateau. The stream's entire course and drainage basin are in Marion County.

== Geography ==
Buffalo Creek rises near Marion County's western boundary, near the community of Brink, and flows generally eastward through the communities of Logansport, Mannington, Rachel, Farmington, Pine Grove, and Barrackville to Fairmont, where it flows into the Monongahela River from the west. Among other tributaries, it collects the Pyles Fork from the north at Mannington. Downstream of Mannington, the creek is paralleled for much of its course by U.S. Route 250.

According to the West Virginia Department of Environmental Protection, approximately 84% of the Buffalo Creek watershed is forested, mostly deciduous. Approximately 14% is used for pasture and agriculture.

== Flow rate ==
At the United States Geological Survey's stream gauge at Barrackville, 4.4 miles (7.1 km) upstream of the creek's mouth, the annual mean flow of the river between 1907 and 2012 was 169 cubic feet per second (4.8 m^{3}/s). The highest recorded flow during the period was 10,400 cu ft/s (290 m^{3}/s) on February 19, 2000. The lowest recorded flow was 0 cu ft/s (0 m^{3}/s) for an extended period in 1908.

== See also ==
- List of rivers of West Virginia
- Barrackville Covered Bridge
