= Staunton and Parkersburg Turnpike =

The Staunton–Parkersburg Turnpike was built in what is now the U.S. states of Virginia and West Virginia during the second quarter of the 19th century to provide a roadway from Staunton, Virginia and the upper Shenandoah Valley to the Ohio River at present-day Parkersburg, West Virginia. Engineered by Claudius Crozet through the mountainous terrain, it was a toll road partially funded by the Virginia Board of Public Works. Control of this road became crucial during the American Civil War. Today, the Staunton-Parkersburg Turnpike can be largely traversed by following West Virginia Route 47 east from Parkersburg to Linn, then U.S. Route 33 east through Weston and Buckhannon to Elkins, then U.S. Route 250 southeast through Beverly, Huttonsville, crossing the West Virginia/Virginia state line to Staunton, Virginia.

== History ==
=== Colonial Virginia and antebellum period ===
The area which was once considered Virginia was much larger during the Colonial Period, extending west to include much of the other current states of Kentucky, Indiana, and Illinois, as well as parts of Ohio and Pennsylvania before the American Revolutionary War. During the next 75 years, as part of the United States, the area which is now West Virginia had also been part of Virginia. During the American Civil War, on June 20, 1863, West Virginia officially became a separate state.

=== Early transportation ===
For the settlers in the Virginia Colony which preceded statehood (1607–1776), commerce and travel followed navigable waterways and traditional Native American (American Indian) trails. The natives had long sought the routes of greatest ease, and the newcomers did likewise.

Jamestown was selected for establishment of the first permanent English settlement in the Colony based upon its strategic location on the James River. This priority ignored swampy and inhospitable conditions of the land which nearly wiped out the settlement during its first five years, especially during the Starving Time in 1609–1610. However, after colonist John Rolfe cultivated a successful strain of tobacco, the product emerged beginning in 1612 as a profitable export crop for the colony. Soon plantations with wharfs were located along both sides of that river and others in the coastal plain region of the eastern part of the state. As development spread westward, above the Fall Line, early turnpikes and canals were built to cross areas where waterways and areas were not navigable. This was easier done in the less rugged coastal plain of the Tidewater region and Piedmont terrain east of the Blue Ridge Mountains, which formed a formidable barrier to the west.

Settlement of the Shenandoah Valley, between the Blue Ridge Mountains and the eastern edge of the Appalachian plateau, was done by pioneers who migrated south from Maryland and Pennsylvania via the head of the Potomac River and the valley of the Shenandoah River, rather than across the Blue Ridge. The Valley Turnpike ran along part of this corridor, chiefly following the route of an old Native American trail.

=== Trans-Allegheny region of Virginia ===
The area now known as West Virginia was referred to in antebellum times as Virginia's Trans-Allegheny region. It presented much greater challenges to transportation than did less rugged portions of the state. However, there was a goal on the western side. There, at and beyond the western edge of the Appalachian plateau, the terrain became less hilly. In addition, navigable waterways like the Kanawha River and the Ohio River led to the Mississippi River, and thence to the Gulf of Mexico. After the Louisiana Purchase from France in 1803, an acquisition by the United States of most of the land along the Mississippi and Missouri Rivers, about 530,000,000 acres (828,000 sq mi or 2,100,000 km^{2}) of territory, the portions of this area along navigable waterways were settled by Americans moving west and immigrants, mostly English and other northern Europeans, gradually squeezing out the Native Americans in the process.

Although the eastern Virginians often were not supportive of infrastructure improvements in the Trans-Allegheny region, many easterners all along the coastal areas of the Atlantic Ocean and points inland wanted transportation for commerce as this area was developed. However, the regions with mountains were the biggest area where navigable waterways were unavailable and canals impractical. Wheeled vehicles in the form of wagons and later railroads and motor vehicles needed to pass through with passengers and freight. This support for improvements could gain the broad support needed in the state government.

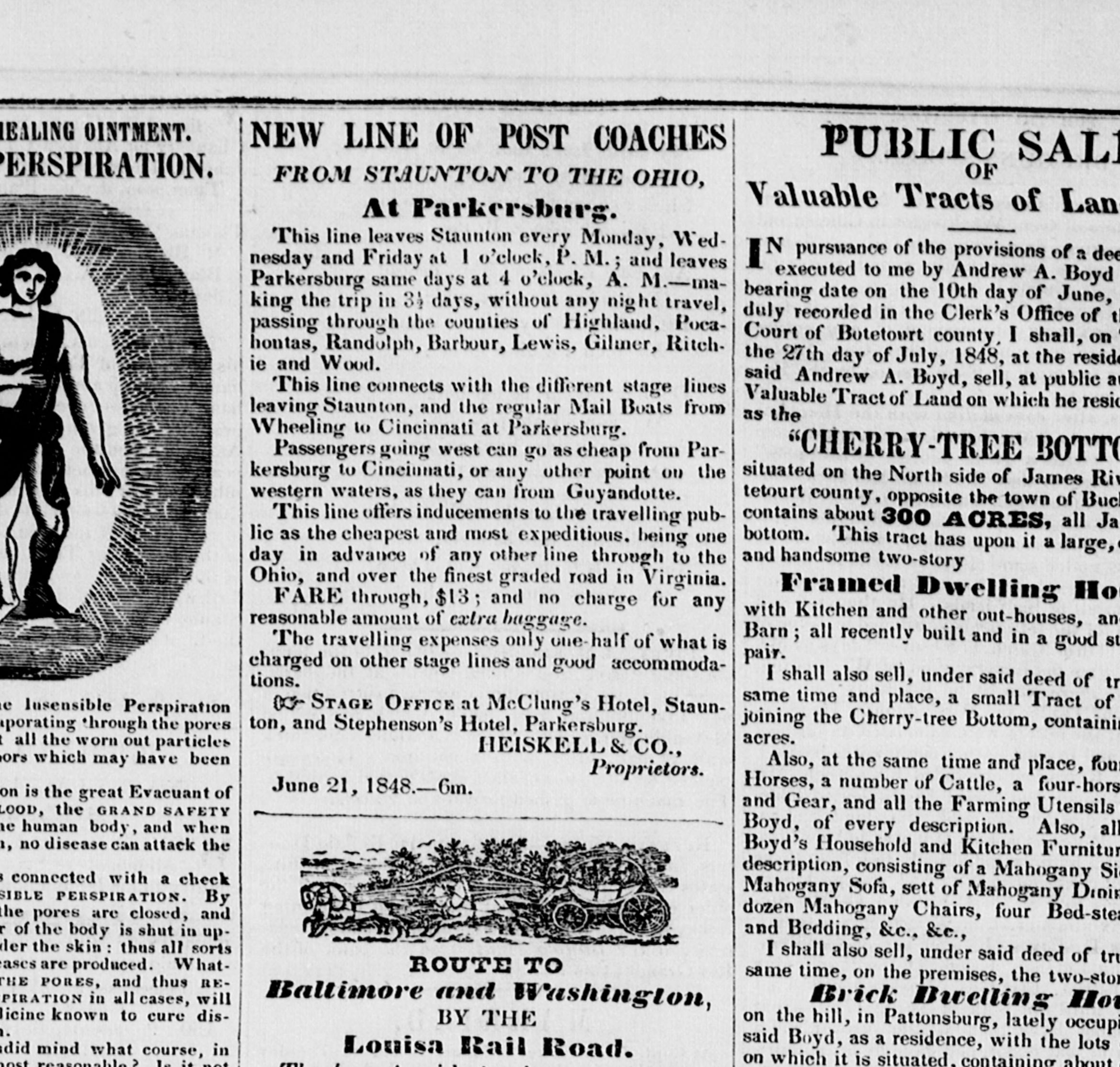
1848 advertisement in Staunton Spectator for travel on the Staunton Turnpike

=== Building and funding improvements: tolls ===
Toll ferries and toll bridges had long been established as ways to cross obstacles such as waterways, and recover the investments needed to build the infrastructure and operating expenses to maintain them from user fees. Turnpikes were among the earlier solutions to crossing the land areas where canals where not practical, such as the mountains. Turnpikes followed the same basic financial model as canals and toll bridges by collecting tolls for passage. Such facilities were totally or partially privately funded by private individuals or groups.

=== Virginia Board of Public Works ===
The Virginia Board of Public Works was created in 1816 to oversee state investments in transportation infrastructure. It was a governmental agency that helped finance the development of Virginia's internal transportation improvements. In that era, it was customary to invest public funds in private companies, which were the forerunners of the public service and utility companies of modern times.

Of the many people who helped build Virginia's transportation infrastructure, the most important individual may have been French-born civil engineer Claudius Crozet (1789–1864). Crozet served in the military forces in France under Napoleon and emigrated to the United States with his wife. Also an educator, he helped found Virginia Military Institute (VMI).

During two periods of major development, Crozet served as Principal Engineer and later Chief Engineer for the Board of Public Works. He was involved with the planning and construction of many of the canals, turnpikes, bridges and railroads in Virginia, including the area that is now West Virginia. Almost all potential projects were carefully planned and surveyed for feasibility and cost estimates by Crozet and his staff. This work is well documented in the archives of the Library of Virginia in Richmond, with some items including maps available for viewing online.

Of his many projects, Crozet is probably best remembered for his engineering in the mountains, especially the famous Blue Ridge Tunnel complex which carried the Virginia Central Railroad (later the Chesapeake and Ohio Railway) through the Blue Ridge Mountains at Rockfish Gap.

Most of the projects of the Board of Public Works occurred before the American Civil War, which decimated Virginia financially. It split into two separate states, when West Virginia seceded and joined the Union. The Staunton-Parkersburg Turnpike was one of the projects completed before the war, with engineering and financial investments from the Board.

=== Gaining authorization and funding to build the Turnpike ===
Some residents believed the Board of Public Works ignored requests for projects in the Trans-Allegheny region in favor of eastern projects. However, politicians and local authorities succeeded in getting the State to authorize a study for a road from Staunton to Parkersburg by the Board of Public Works. Beginning around 1826, Crozet was given the formidable task of determining a potential route for a turnpike from Staunton in Augusta County in the Shenandoah Valley to Parkersburg in Wood County on the Ohio River.

There was considerable interest among communities in the region between these points to be included along the route. Some communities authorized financial contributions to the cost to help influence a favorable location.

However, years passed before the state authorized proceeding. Finally, during the Acts of Assembly in 1838, the Virginia General Assembly authorized the Board of Public Works to invest in and assist with construction of the road.

Among the specifications set forth were:

"It shall no where exceed a grade of four degrees, nor shall be more than twenty feet wide, nor less than fifteen feet."

=== Building the turnpike ===
The original planning had been done in 1826. After funding was authorized to build the turnpike in 1838, Crozet reviewed the earlier plans and revised some portions. The following year, after some adjustments in the routing, Crozet estimated that the "distance from Staunton to Parkersburg will be probably between 220 and 230 miles."

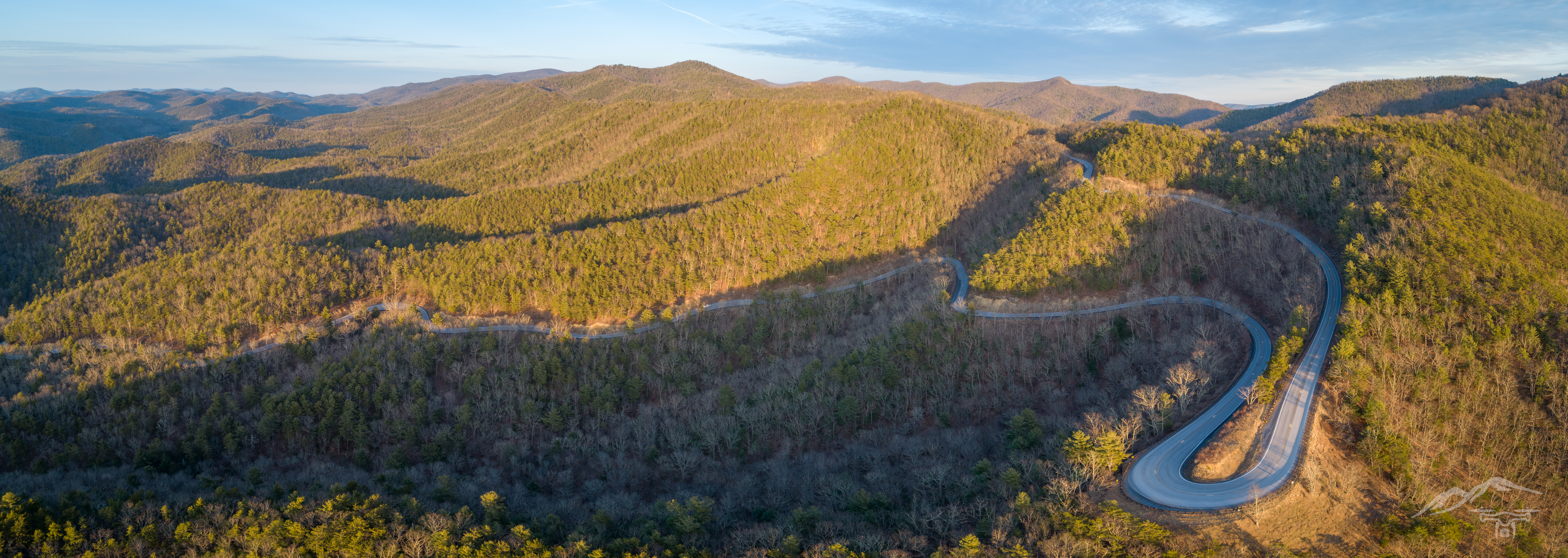
Staunton-Parkersburg Turnpike (modern US 250) crossing Shenandoah Mountain in Highland County, Virginia

Crozet settled on a route that passed west of Staunton through the tiny village of Monterey, in Highland County. Virginia's least-populated county, it is called "Virginia's Switzerland," in reference to the steep mountains and valleys. The route crossed into what is now Pocahontas County, West Virginia at Allegheny Mountain. As the route winds through the mountainous terrain, there are many switchbacks and loops designed by Crozet as he attempted to meet the 4% maximum grade standard. In this area, the road passes near modern attractions such as the Green Bank Observatory and Cass Scenic Railroad, and the communities of Bartow, Frank, and Durbin.

West of Bartow, it crossed the West Fork Greenbrier River, and wound up the eastern slope of Back Allegheny Mountain. At the top, it crossed the nearly flat plateau typical of the region's mountaintops. (In the 21st century, much of this land is part of the Monongahela National Forest). The turnpike descended Cheat Mountain into the valley of the Tygart Valley River and followed it northerly to the town of Beverly, the original county seat of Randolph County, arriving in 1841.

At Beverly, the turnpike spanned the Tygart Valley River where the Beverly Covered Bridge was constructed in 1845–47 by Lemuel Chenoweth (1811–1887), a local and master bridge builder. It then turned almost due west once again, crossing Rich Mountain near the site of the future (1861) Battle of Rich Mountain. Continuing west, it passed through Buckhannon, Weston, Troy, and Burnt House. The final western stretch generally followed the route of the Little Kanawha River to reach its terminus at Parkersburg on the western bank of the Ohio River.

=== Operation on the turnpike ===
Turnpike operations included through and local traffic. Toll houses, always staffed, were established at intervals, so as to collect from both types of traffic. Toll house sites were placed where it would be difficult for travelers to take an alternate routing and escape paying the toll.

=== Regional conflicts divide Virginia ===
Most historians are in agreement that slavery was the biggest issue of the conflict in the United States that led to the American Civil War (1861–1865). Then the fifth most populous state, Virginia had dramatic differences among its regions. The social conditions in western Virginia were unlike those in the eastern portion of the state. Most immigrants had come from Pennsylvania in the 18th century and included Germans; Protestant Ulster-Scots, the largest group by far from the British Isles before the American Revolution; and settlers from states farther north.

As early as the American Revolution, there was movement to create a state beyond the Alleghenies. In 1776, settlers presented a petition for the establishment of "Westsylvania" to Congress, on the grounds that the mountains made an almost impassable barrier on the east. The rugged nature of the country and poverty of the settlers meant that most became yeomen subsistence farmers. Since few held slaves, their ethnic and cultural differences from the Tidewater and Piedmont planters became stronger with economic considerations. Time increased the social, political and economic differences between the two sections of Virginia.

However, the conflicts between regions were never resolved within Virginia, nor separate state formed, until the American Civil War broke out. Eastern Virginians voted to secede and join the Confederate States of America. However, many western counties wanted to remain in the Union. An act for the reorganization of the government was passed on June 19, 1861, and a provisional government loyal to Union was set up initially based at Wheeling. The pro-northern government authorized the creation of the state of Kanawha, consisting of most of the counties that now comprise West Virginia. A little over one month later, Kanawha was renamed West Virginia. These actions were formally approved by the West Virginia public by wide margins.

The state was admitted to the Union effective June 20, 1863; officers for the new state were chosen. Governor Pierpont moved his capital to Alexandria from which he asserted jurisdiction over the counties of Virginia within the Federal lines, since the disposition of eastern Virginia as part of the Confederacy or Union had yet to be resolved. Following the end of hostilities, most of the portion which had considered itself part of the Confederacy Virginia rejoined the Union, with the exception of two northern counties which chose to join West Virginia in 1866.

=== American Civil War ===
During the American Civil War, some of the earliest campaigns of the Civil War were fought for control of the Staunton–Parkersburg (S-P) Turnpike, as well as the adjacent portion of the Baltimore and Ohio Railroad (B&O).

The Battle of Rich Mountain took place on July 11, 1861. The Union victory at Rich Mountain gave the Union Army control of the S-P turnpike, of the Tygart's Valley, the covered bridge at Philippi, and of all of the territory of western Virginia to the north and west, including the B&O railroad.

The harsh winter conditions in the mountain climate convinced the leaders of both armies to move on, and they were soon involved in Stonewall Jackson's Valley campaign. The region essentially remained under Union control for the remainder of the War.

=== Conflict over debt of Virginia Board of Public Works ===
Following the end of the Civil War, and the Reconstruction period, Virginia faced a massive debt problem. Much of this had originated in investments made by the Board of Public Works, including improvements such as this turnpike by then located chiefly in West Virginia. In 1871, the United States Supreme Court decided the first of two cases concerning the new state, ruling in Virginia v. West Virginia that Berkeley and Jefferson Counties would be part of the new state, confirming the 1866 election results in those counties fronting on the Potomac River (and north of this turnpike). Still, Virginia and West Virginia owed money for debts on infrastructure which had been destroyed during the war and had to be replaced.

The recovering state did not have adequate revenues to pay all these debts. Sharp political divisions in Virginia on this issue resulted in creation of a new major political group in the late 1870s, the Readjusters, a coalition of Democrats, Republicans, and African-Americans seeking a reduction in Virginia's prewar debt by allocating an appropriate portion to the new State of West Virginia.

For several decades, Virginia and West Virginia disputed the new state's share of the Virginia government's debt. The issue was finally settled when the United States Supreme Court in Virginia v. West Virginia (1911) ruled that West Virginia owed Virginia $12,393,929.50. The final installment of this sum was paid off in 1939.

=== Past its heyday ===
By the end of the 19th century, virtually every hollow in West Virginia was reached by railroad lines. These served the lumber and coal industries, bringing with them new jobs and prosperity. While through-traffic along the turnpike became less important than in the past to local needs it remained an important thoroughfare.

Beginning primarily in the boom years of the 1920s, the state paved many highways to provide for automobiles. Although the state made some re-routing improvements, considerable sections of the original turnpike remained the best available route through the state. Much of it east of Beverly to Staunton became U.S. Route 250.

== National Scenic Byway ==
The West Virginia portion of the Staunton–Parkersburg Turnpike was named a National Scenic Byway in 2005. The state and local communities have developed resources to assist travelers and tourist attractions to appeal to a wide range of interests. The best news for shunpikers, in addition to many local amenities close by, is that there are no tolls on the turnpike these days.

== See also ==
- List of turnpikes in Virginia and West Virginia
- White Top
