= Pine Grove, Marion County, West Virginia =

Pine Grove
- Unincorporated community
- Location within the state of West Virginia Pine Grove (the United States)
- Coordinates: 39°30′00″N 80°11′46″W
- Country: United States
- State: West Virginia
- County: Marion
- Time zone: UTC-5 (Eastern (EST))
  - Summer (DST): UTC-4 (EDT)
- GNIS feature ID: 1544873

Pine Grove is an unincorporated community in Marion County, West Virginia, United States. Pine Groves lies to the west of Barrackville along Buffalo Creek.
