= Logansport, West Virginia =

- Unincorporated community
- Location within West Virginia Location within the United States
- Coordinates: 39°31′09″N 80°24′49″W
- Country: United States
- State: West Virginia
- County: Marion
- Elevation: 1,001 ft (305 m)
- Time zone: UTC-5 (Eastern (EST))
  - Summer (DST): UTC-4 (EDT)
- Area codes: 304 & 681
- GNIS feature ID: 1542314

Logansport is an unincorporated community in Marion County, West Virginia, United States. Logansport is located on Buffalo Creek and County Route 1, 3.8 miles (6.1 km) west of Mannington.
