= Rosser's Raid =

Date	January 11, 1864
Location	Beverly, West Virginia 38°50′43.08″N 79°52′17.22″W
Result	Successful Confederate Raid

Belligerents
Confederate Army	Union Army

Commanders and leaders
BG Thomas L. Rosser; Col. William A. Morgan; Col. Albert W. Cook	Lt. Col. Robert Youart; Lt. Col. Luther Furney

Units involved
Volunteers	34th Ohio

Strength
300	600

Casualties and losses
5 KIA; 16 wounded	25 KIA or wounded 575 captured
- Location within West Virginia

Rosser's Raid was a cavalry raid in the American Civil War on January 11, 1864 in Beverly, West Virginia.

After learning about Union supplies in Randolph County on the Tygarts River, Brigadier General Thomas L. Rosser proposed a raid on the Beverly supply depot to his superior Major General Fitzhugh Lee as the Confederates were in need of the supplies. He asked for volunteers from the three brigades in the division and got 300 men.

They set off on January 7, 1864 in a heavy rain and freezing temperatures. They camped on a mountain summit January 8 in the rain and snow. By January 10 they had reached Cheat Mountain and marched down from the summit in a thunderstorm.

They would come upon the Union camp at 4 a.m. on January 11 near the Philippi Pike. The Union soldiers were asleep in log huts they had built for the winter, thinking that it was not possible for the enemy to attack in the terrible weather. Rosser's troops rushed the huts and took the Union soldiers by surprise and in just 30 minutes had killed or wounded 25 and captured 575 men and 8 officers. They also captured 100 horses, 600 rifles and rations The Confederate cavalry were able to set fire to at least one bridge and several empty supply buildings.

The journey back to Confederate lines at Swope's Depot took two days in bitter cold. A number of the Union prisoners were able to escape including both of the Union colonels Youart and Furney. Both would make it back to Union lines and face courtmartial. They were dismissed from the army. The rest of the Union prisoners would be sent to Richmond.

The supplies did not last long and only provided minimal relief for the starving Confederates.

== Battle marker ==
There is a historical marker in Beverly, West Virginia on Main Street (West Virginia Route 92) just north of Cemetery Lane.
