= Barrackville Covered Bridge =

- U.S. National Register of Historic Places
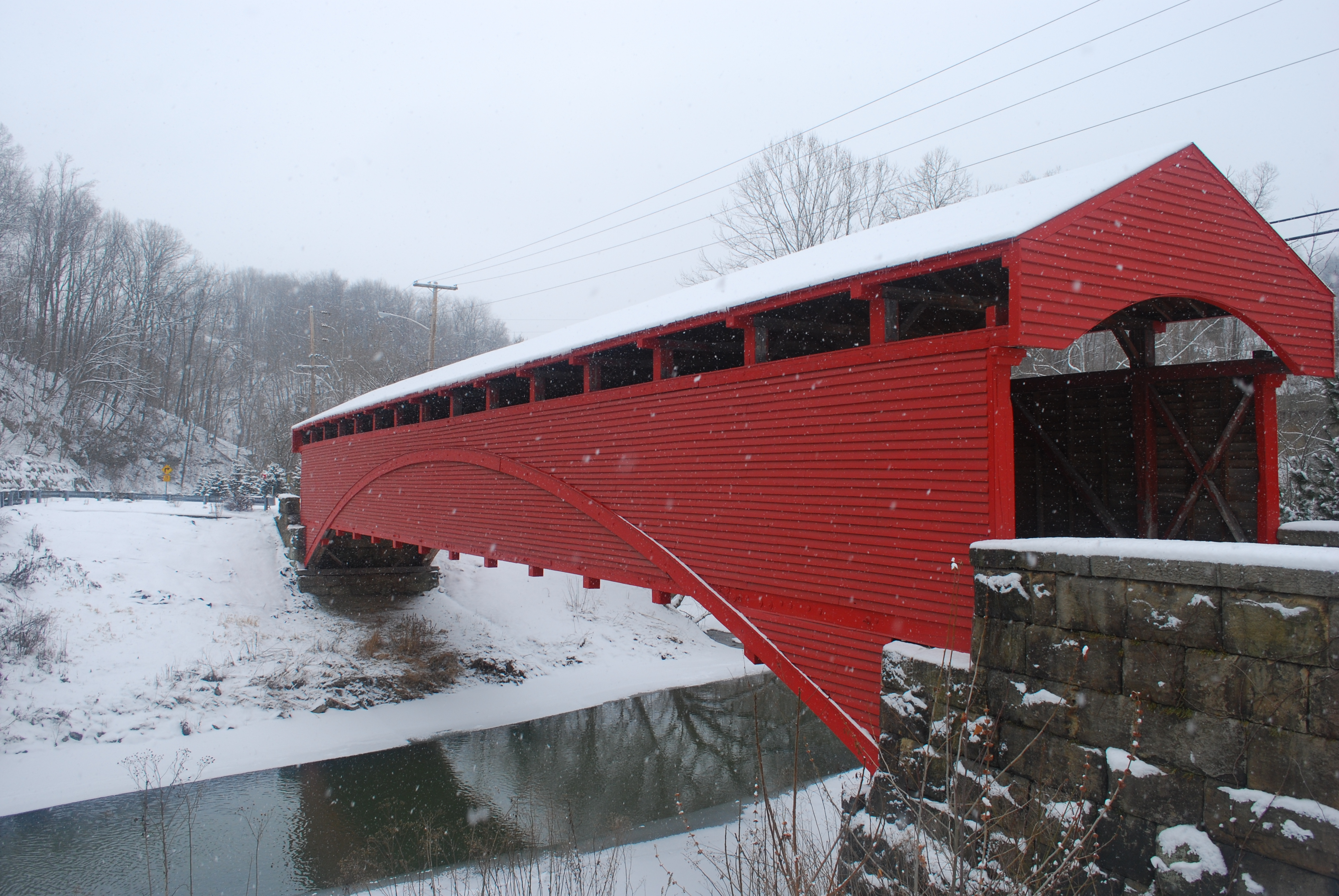

- Location within West Virginia Location within the United States
- Location: WV 21, over Buffalo Creek, Barrackville, West Virginia
- Coordinates: 39°30′21″N 80°10′5″W
- Area: 0.1 acres (0.040 ha)
- Built: 1853
- Architect: Chenoweth, Lemuel
- Architectural style: Burr truss
- MPS: West Virginia Covered Bridges TR
- NRHP reference No.: 73001921
- Added to NRHP: March 30, 1973

The Barrackville Covered Bridge spans 145 feet (44 m) in a single span across Buffalo Creek near Barrackville, West Virginia. Built in 1853 by local bridge builder Lemuel Chenoweth, the structure is a modified arched Burr truss, with siding added twenty years after the bridge's construction.

It was listed on the National Register of Historic Places in 1981.

== See also ==
- Philippi Covered Bridge, also built by Chenoweth
- List of bridges documented by the Historic American Engineering Record in West Virginia
- List of West Virginia covered bridges
