= Philippi Covered Bridge =

- U.S. National Register of Historic Places
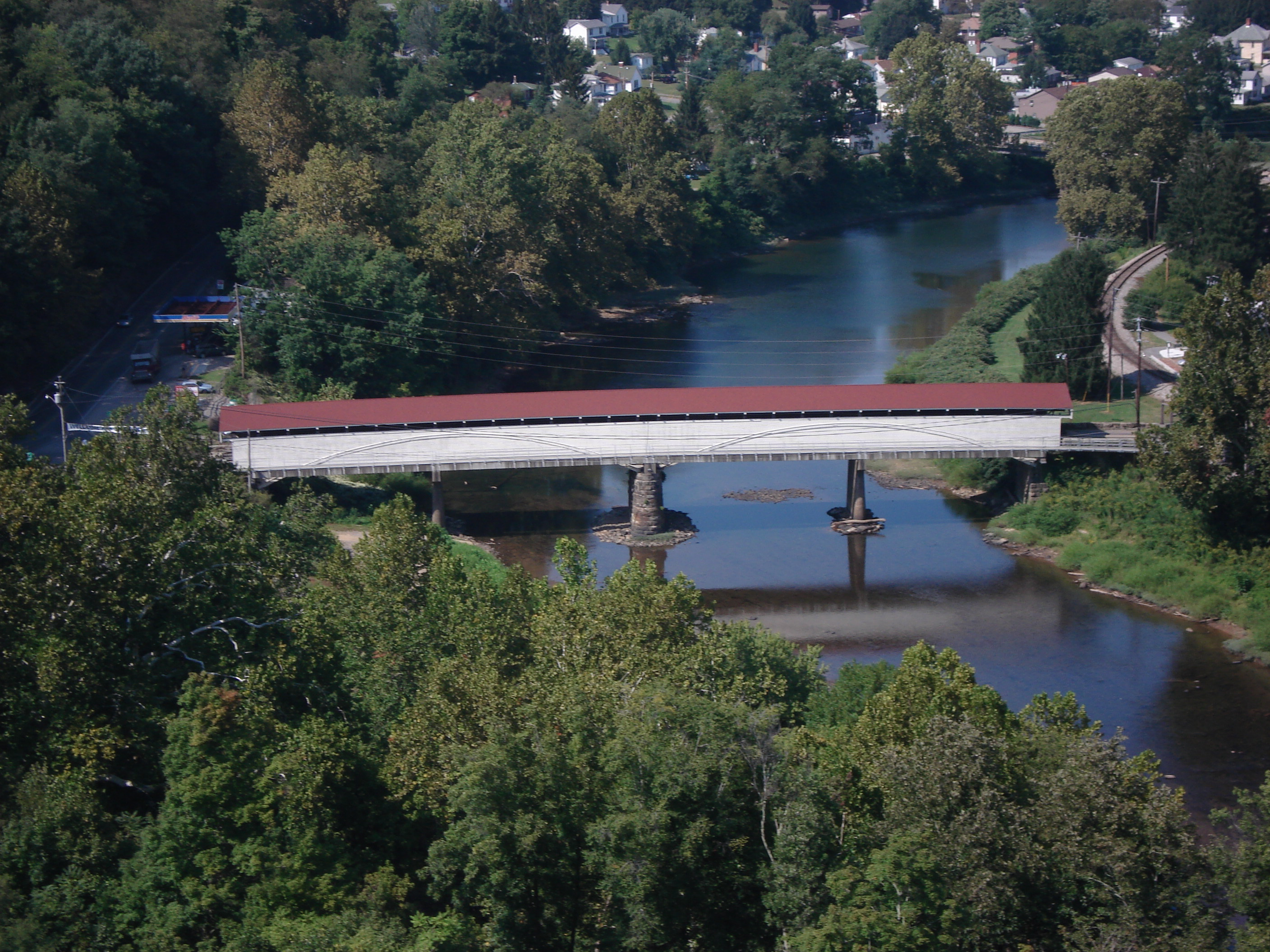
- The bridge as it appears since its 1991 reconstruction. The neighborhood of North Philippi is visible beyond.

- Location within West Virginia Location within the United States
- Location: U.S. 250 at jct. with U.S. 119, Philippi, West Virginia
- Coordinates: 39°9′11″N 80°2′37″W
- Area: less than one acre
- Built: 1852
- Architect: Chenoweth, Lemuel
- MPS: West Virginia Covered Bridges TR
- NRHP reference No.: 72001284
- Added to NRHP: September 14, 1972

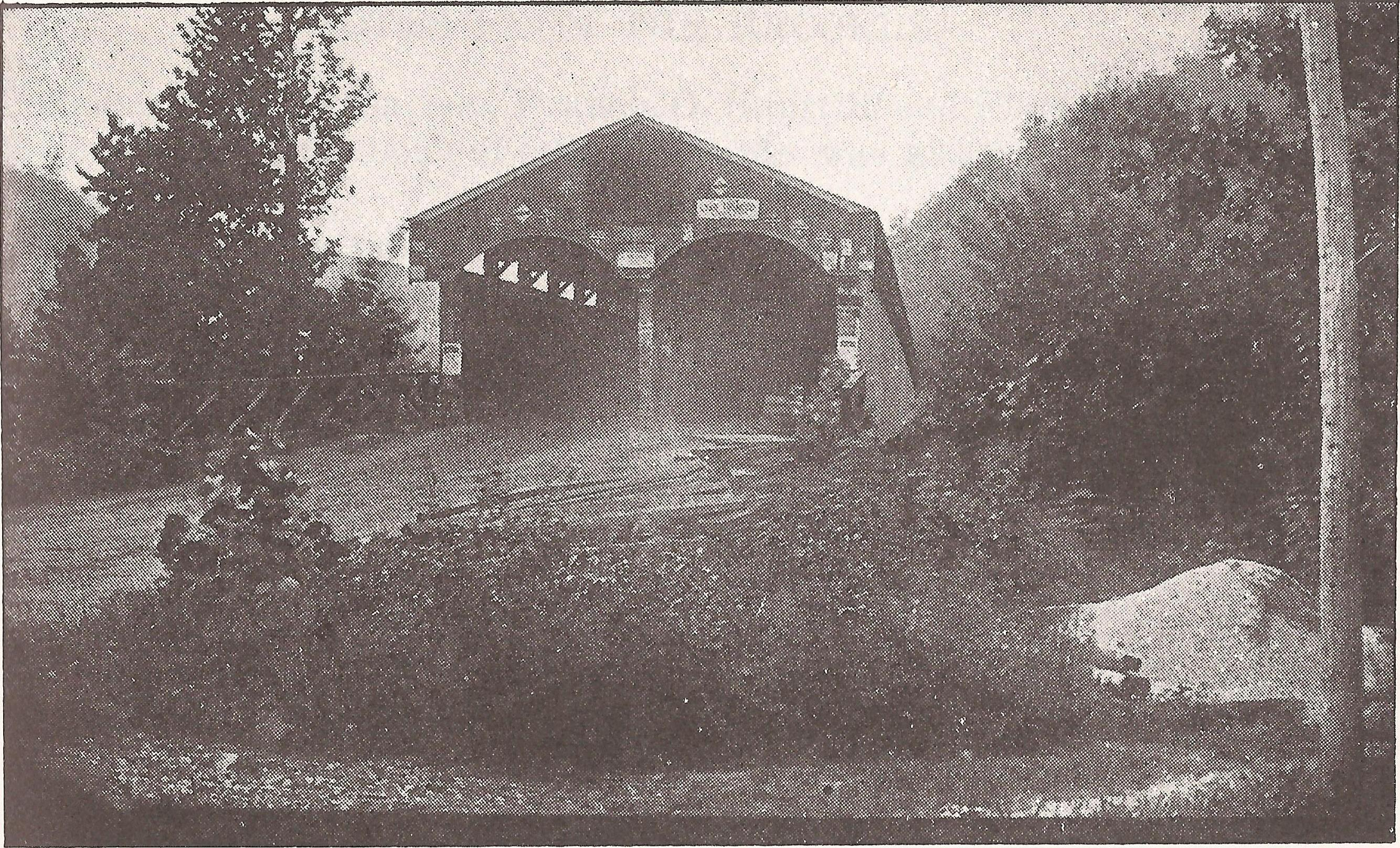
The Philippi Covered Bridge (northeast end) as it appeared ca. 1899.

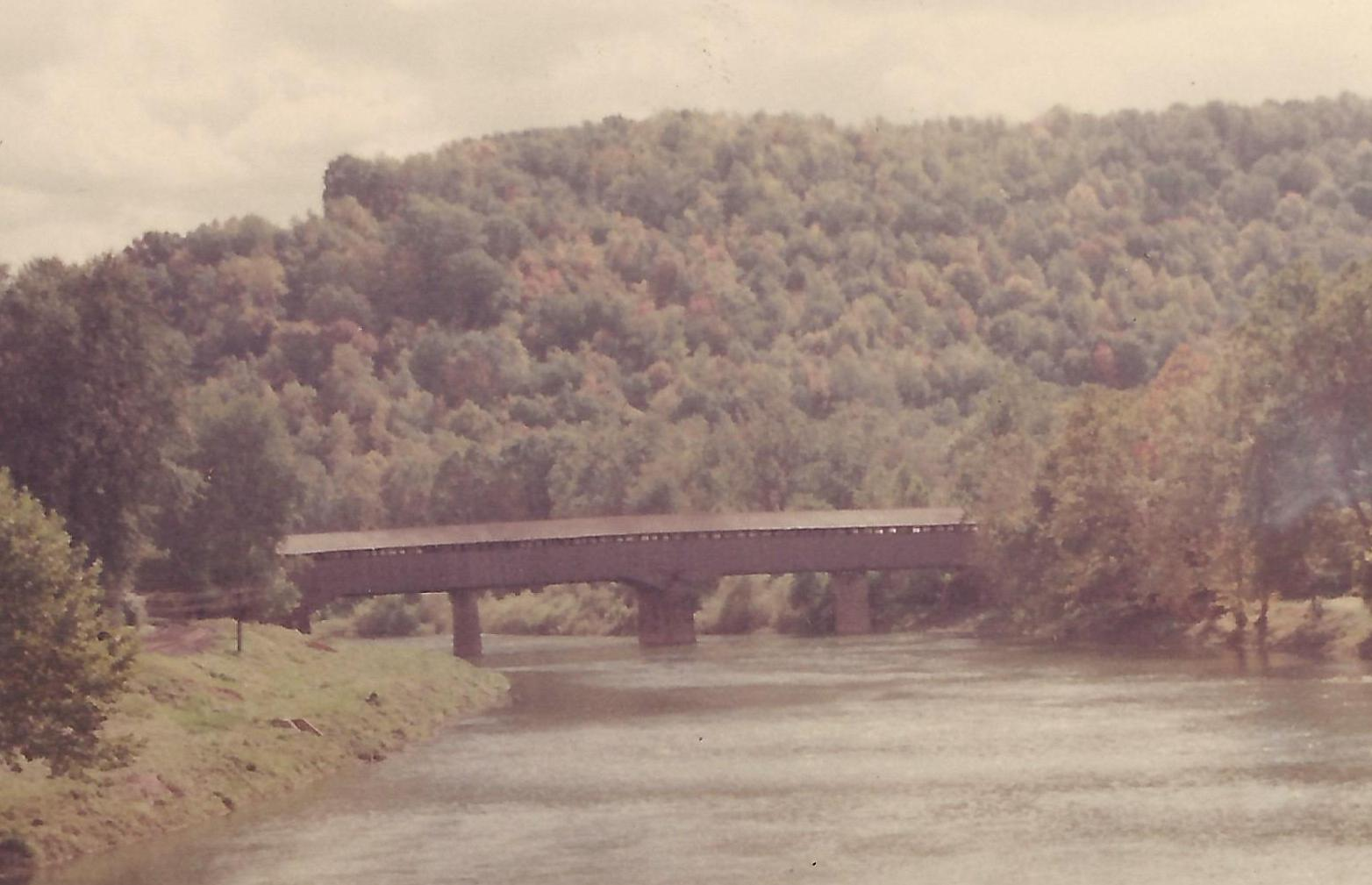
The Philippi Covered Bridge, circa 1970.

The Philippi Covered Bridge in 2015.

The Philippi Covered Bridge, on the Tygart Valley River, is the main local landmark and historical icon of Philippi, West Virginia, USA.

The celebrated bridge was commissioned by the General Assembly of Virginia and constructed in 1852 by Lemuel Chenoweth, a well-known Appalachian bridge builder, to provide a link on an important segment of the vital Beverly-Fairmont Turnpike between Beverly (Chenoweth's hometown) and Fairmont. The bridge has strong associations with the American Civil War, especially the Battle of Philippi (1861).

The Philippi Covered Bridge is the oldest and longest covered bridge in West Virginia and one of only two remaining in Barbour County. It is also the only covered bridge on the United States Numbered Highway System (as part of U.S. Route 250). It was placed on the National Register of Historic Places in 1972.

== History ==
=== Bidding, design and construction ===
The circumstances of the bidding on the contract for the bridges in western Virginia are given by Hu Maxwell:

Bidders were present [at Richmond] in large numbers from the East and the North, with all sorts of models and plans, including iron structures, wire cables, cantilevers, stone arches, and wooden bridges of many kinds. Mr. Chenoweth was there with his model made of hickory wood, as strong as it could possibly be made, not to exceed the required size. So far as appearances went, some of the New England Yankees had models of perfect form and beauty, painted and enameled in the highest art. On the appointed day, the bidders all assembled before the Board of Public Works, and each showed his model, and set forth his claims of what weight his bridge would sustain. Mr. Chenoweth was one of the last called forward to show what he had. His plain wooden model did not attract much attention; but he created consternation among the other bidders when he placed his model on two chairs, one end resting on each, and then stood on his little bridge, and called on the other architects to put theirs to the test by doing the same. Not one would do it, for they knew their models would be crushed. If the Philippi bridge were as strong in proportion to its size as Mr. Chenoweth's model, it would sustain the weight of a man six hundred feet high. The test decided the contest, and Mr Chenoweth was given the contract for the bridges.

The structure is 285½ feet (originally 312 feet) long and 26 feet (7.9 m) wide and was originally supported by three massive sandstone piers constructed by Emmett J. O'Brien. The bridge design incorporates the "Long" Burr Arch Truss and was built for $12,180.68. It is one of few surviving "double-barreled" (two lane) covered bridges in the United States.

=== Civil War ===
The bridge was used on 3 June 1861 by both Union and Confederate troops after the Battle of Philippi, by some reckonings the first land battle of the American Civil War. The bridge was the first to be captured in the war by either side and was used for a time as a barracks by the victorious Union troops.

The bridge narrowly escaped burning in April and May 1863 at the time of the Confederate raids on the B&O Railroad west of Cumberland, Maryland. Orders were issued by General William E. Jones for the burning of it and of the covered bridge at Rowlesburg, but the intercession of several locals of Southern sympathies (especially Elder Joshua S. Corder) saved both.

=== Structural modifications ===
The bridge has undergone a number of renovations after being severely damaged at least seven times over the years.

In 1934, increased motorized traffic mandated the addition of two concrete piers to the bridge's substructure (for a total of five) along with a new steel reinforced concrete deck (to replace the old wooden one) and an external walkway to better accommodate pedestrian traffic.

The bridge was damaged by a severe flood on 4–5 November 1985 and was virtually destroyed by fire on 2 February 1989. A gasoline tanker truck refilling underground tanks at a nearby filling station overfilled a tank, spilling gasoline which ran down into the bridge. A car passing through the bridge then sparked a fire when its exhaust system backfired. The bridge was then closed to traffic until a $1.4 million reconstruction was completed and the bridge reopened on 16 September 1991. The reconstruction, under the direction of the bridge historian and West Virginia University professor Emory Kemp, included replacing the damaged yellow poplar supports. Care was taken to restore the exterior to its original appearance: the rounded double arch entrances were restored, red-painted shingles (also of poplar) were affixed to the roof and new external wooden siding was replaced in a horizontal orientation.

Today, the original, burnt wooden trusses and supports can still be seen when driving through the bridge.

== Folklore ==
- A local legend once asserted that US President Abraham Lincoln and Confederate President Jefferson Davis were witnessed by a small boy meeting secretly in the bridge late in the course of the American Civil War to discuss peace terms.

== See also ==
- List of West Virginia covered bridges
- Barrackville Covered Bridge, also designed by Chenoweth
- National Register of Historic Places listings in West Virginia
