= Beverly Historic District =

Historic district in West Virginia, United States

- U.S. National Register of Historic Places
- U.S. Historic district
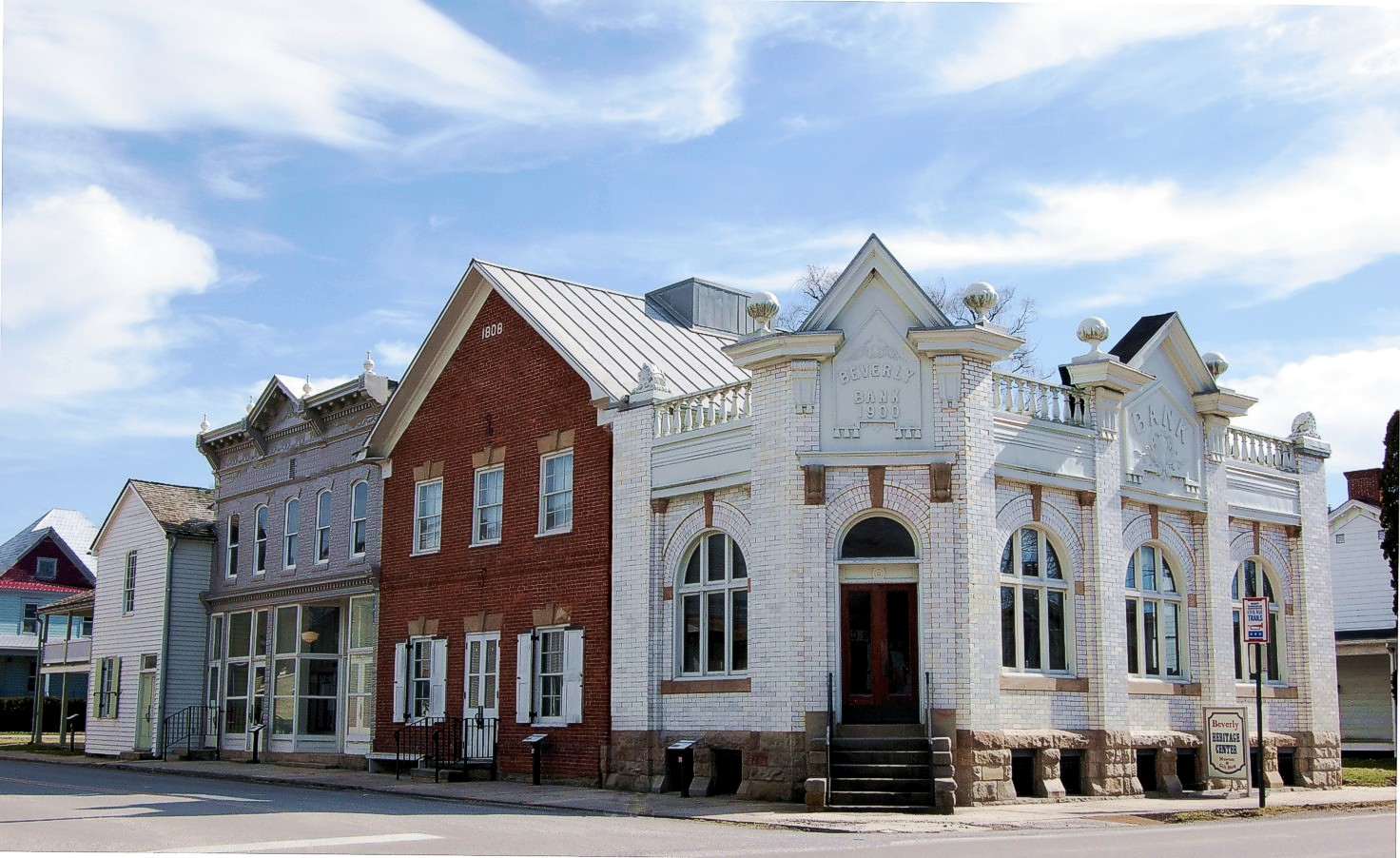
- The Beverly Heritage Center, March 2012

- Location within West Virginia Location within the United States
- Location: WV 92 and U.S. 219 and 250, Beverly, West Virginia
- Coordinates: 38°50′29″N 79°52′30″W
- Area: 40 acres (16 ha)
- Built by: Multiple, including Lemurl Chenoweth
- Architectural style: Classical Revival, Other, Federal, Georgian Revival
- NRHP reference No.: 80004040 (original); 14001062 (increase)

Significant dates
- Added to NRHP: January 11, 1980
- Boundary increase: December 16, 2014

Beverly Historic District is a national historic district located at Beverly, Randolph County, West Virginia. It encompasses 51 contributing buildings that reflect the history of Beverly from its founding to the end of the 19th century. Notable buildings include the Randolph County Courthouse (1808–1894; 1896–1900), old Randolph County Jail (1813–1841), Randolph County Jail (1841), Beverly Public Square (1787), Beverly Cemetery (1768), Beverly Presbyterian Church (1869), Beverly United Methodist Church (1890), Home of "The Enterprise" (c. 1800), and the Peter Buckey House and Hotel (1790–1865). Also located in the district is the separately listed Blackman-Bosworth Store.

It was listed on the National Register of Historic Places in 1980, and increased in size in 2014.
