= Brink, West Virginia =

Unincorporated community in West Virginia, United States

- Unincorporated community
- Location within West Virginia Location within the United States
- Coordinates: 39°32′53″N 80°29′34″W
- Country: United States
- State: West Virginia
- Counties: Marion and Wetzel
- Elevation: 1,411 ft (430 m)
- Time zone: UTC-5 (Eastern (EST))
  - Summer (DST): UTC-4 (EDT)
- Area codes: 304 & 681
- GNIS feature ID: 1536353

Brink is an unincorporated community in Marion and Wetzel counties, West Virginia, United States. Brink is 8 miles (13 km) west of Mannington.
