= Moorefield and North Branch Turnpike =

Moorefield and North Branch Turnpike (or North Branch Turnpike) was a turnpike in the U.S. state of Virginia (later West Virginia) built to facilitate travel and commerce between the Baltimore and Ohio Railroad at Green Spring on the North Branch Potomac River and Moorefield. Today, Green Spring Road (County Route 1), Harriott-Wappocomo Road (County Route 28/15), and West Virginia Route 28 encompass most of the Moorefield and North Branch Turnpike's original route.

== History ==
=== Establishment and early history ===
In 1845, a stage line was established between Green Spring and Romney and in 1850, it was extended further to Moorefield as a result of the completion of the Moorefield and North Branch Turnpike. The turnpike from Green Spring to Moorefield was built by a stock company chartered on April 7, 1838, with the state of Virginia taking two-fifths of the stock.

The purpose of the turnpike was to provide access to the Baltimore and Ohio Railroad and points east from the South Branch Potomac River Valley. The Moorefield and North Branch Turnpike enabled travelers to arrive at Green Spring via the railroad and proceed to Romney, Moorefield, or even Parkersburg via the Northwestern Turnpike. The distance between Green Spring and Parkersburg was 210 miles (340 km) and the stage fare was ten dollars. The rail fare from Baltimore, Maryland, to Green Spring was four dollars, thus, the total fare from Baltimore to Parkersburg was fourteen dollars.

On Saturday February 2, 1850, the Virginia House of Delegates passed "an act to regulate the votes of Stockholders in the Moorefield and North Branch Turnpike."

The turnpike's president was Daniel R. McNeill, son of Captain Daniel McNeill. McNeill was best known for inventing the prototype of a railcar in which cattle could be comfortably shipped on the Baltimore and Ohio Railroad. According to historian James Morton Callahan, "[McNeill] was one of the most successful business men who ever lived on the South Branch of the Potomac River." Callahan added further, that at one time, McNeill was the most extensive cattle dealer in Virginia."

=== Profits and expenditures ===
For the fiscal year ending on September 30, 1854, the president, Daniel R. McNeill, and directors of the Moorefield and North Branch Turnpike reported to the Virginia Board of Public Works that the sum of $1,941.60 had been collected in tolls. After paying off its debts to Samuel H. Alexander and Company ($478.85) and making repairs and improvements to the turnpike ($1,213.31), the Moorefield and North Branch Turnpike made its first annual profit of $103.41. Now out of debt, the turnpike's company sought to make further repairs and improvements which it had been prevented from doing on account of the debt owed to Samuel H. Alexander and Company.

As of October 30, 1854 "Report of President and Directors," the company's directors were still acting as superintendents of the sections of the turnpike adjacent to their residences, "all of whom lived upon the line of the road." The directors had not received any reimbursement until the end of the 1854 fiscal year, when the sum of $5 was allowed to each as a remuneration for expenses incurred while attending to the business of the company. The report also indicated the properties owned by the company consisted of three toll houses and lots valued at $1,000.

The company's October 12, 1859, report for the fiscal year ending on September 30, 1859, noted total receipts were $1,735. When added to the previous year's summary and subtracting the $1,161.68 expended during the 1859 fiscal year, the Moorefield and North Branch Turnpike was left with a balance of $2,349.34. The board further reported that due to the heavy rains in September, the turnpike was "greatly injured" and that to repair it would "require a large portion of the balance on hand to put it in proper order."

During the year ending September 30, 1860, the total receipts reported by the turnpike company were $1,959.67, which when added to the balance on hand October 1, 1859, made their balance $4,309.01. The company's directors expended within the year the sum of $1,691.18 leaving a balance in the hands of the treasurer of $2,617.18.

=== American Civil War ===
Because the road was a strategic transportation corridor between the Baltimore and Ohio Railroad and Romney, the Moorefield and North Branch Turnpike was the scene of military activity throughout the American Civil War. On September 24, 1861, the Battle of Hanging Rocks Pass took place along the turnpike at Hanging Rocks. Another engagement occurred on October 26, 1861, at the Wire Bridge at Lower Hanging Rocks that carried the turnpike across the South Branch Potomac River between Grace and Blues Beach.

An article in the June–November 1866 volume of Harper's Magazine entitled "Personal Recollections of the War," written by renowned magazine illustrator David Hunter Strother, recounts Strother's treacherous November 20, 1861, journey on the Moorefield and North Branch Turnpike:

After a hearty dinner with the General we remounted and turned our horses' heads to Green Spring. My Secession steed, although long-legged and fiery at the start, began soon to show symptoms of fagging. Lieutenant Devin's horse was in the same plight, and we soon found ourselves distanced by our driving Colonel. Night overtook us between Springfield and Green Spring and we pursued journey at the risk of being shot either by rebel malignants, who ambuscaded our pickets, or our own suspicious sentinels, who were posted all along the highway at short intervals. At every half mile a picket-fire blazed in the road, and as we advanced into the circle of light the guard had an ugly way of retiring into the shade, out of sight, and with a startling halt, and still more startling click of his musket-lock, demanding our business and condition. As several of our sentinels had been treacherously shot their suspicion was extremely hazardous to the traveler. We were lucky enough to arrive at Green Spring without accident.

During the American Civil War, a United States military telegraph land line was in operation along the Moorefield and North Branch Turnpike on July 1, 1864. The telegraph line ran 7 miles (11 km) between Green Spring and Springfield. It was "necessarily abandoned" later in July 1864.

=== North and South Branches Turnpike ===
The Moorefield and North Branch Turnpike Company was succeeded by the North and South Branches Turnpike Company created by an act of the Legislature of West Virginia on February 19, 1868. Much of the present West Virginia Route 28 follows the route of the North and South Branches Turnpike from Ridgeley to Moorefield.

== See also ==
- List of turnpikes in Virginia and West Virginia
