= Beverly, West Virginia =

- Town
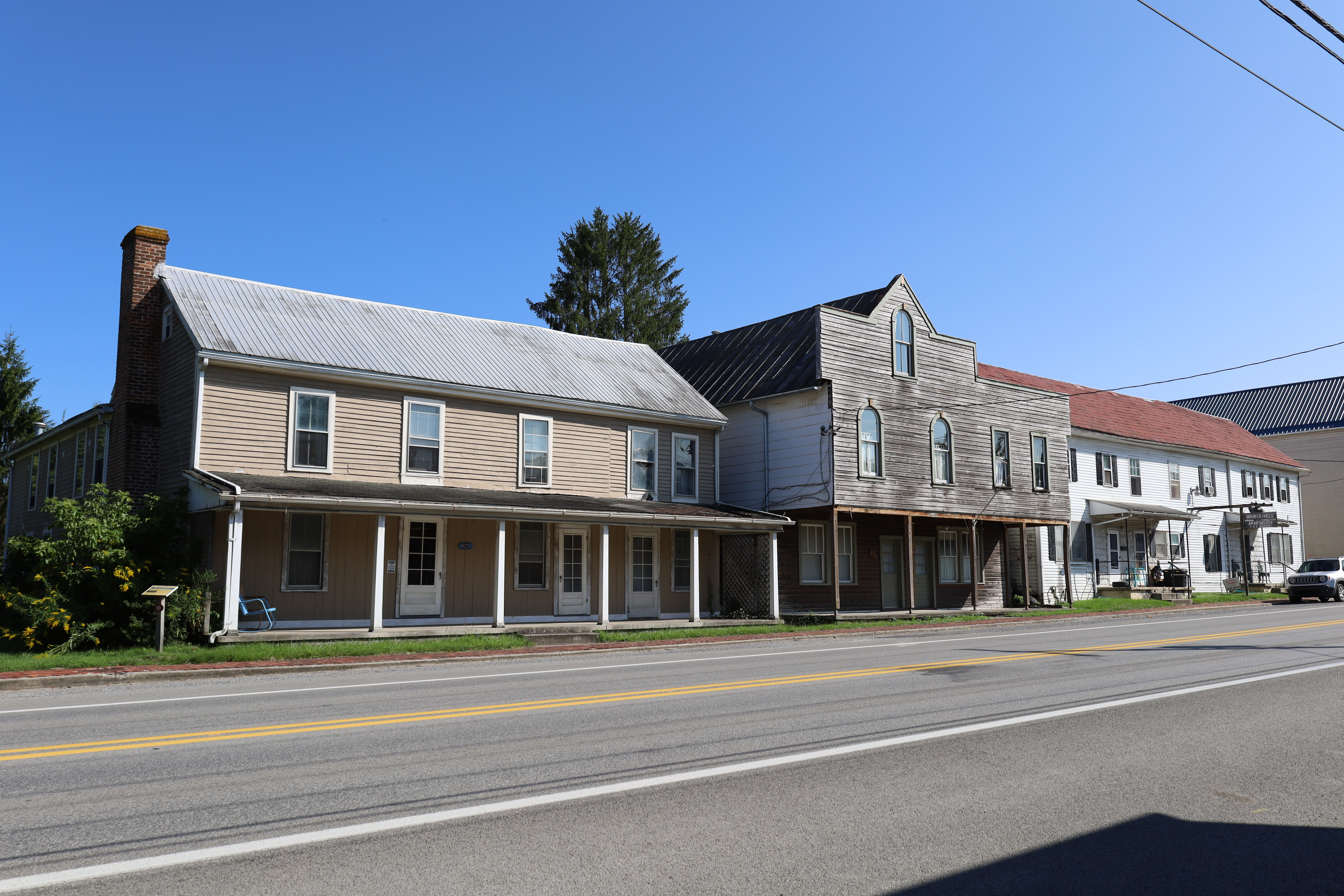
- Buildings in Beverly Historic District in 2021

- Logo

- Location of Beverly in Randolph County, West Virginia.
- Coordinates: 38°51′2″N 79°52′3″W
- Country: United States
- State: West Virginia
- County: Randolph
- Chartered: 1790

Area
  - Total: 0.44 sq mi (1.14 km^{2})
  - Land: 0.44 sq mi (1.14 km^{2})
  - Water: 0 sq mi (0.00 km^{2})
- Elevation: 1,962 ft (598 m)

Population (2020)
  - Total: 622
  - Estimate (2021): 623
  - Density: 1,516.8/sq mi (585.65/km^{2})
- Time zone: UTC-5 (Eastern (EST))
  - Summer (DST): UTC-4 (EDT)
- ZIP code: 26253
- Area code: 304
- FIPS code: 54-06988
- GNIS feature ID: 1553884
- Website: https://townofbeverly.com/

Beverly is a town in Randolph County, West Virginia, United States. Founded in 1787, it is the oldest settlement in the Tygart River Valley. It had a population of 628 at the 2020 census. Beverly was the county seat of Randolph County for over a century—from 1790 until 1899—after which the nearby settlement of Elkins assumed that role following an intense local political "war".

== History ==
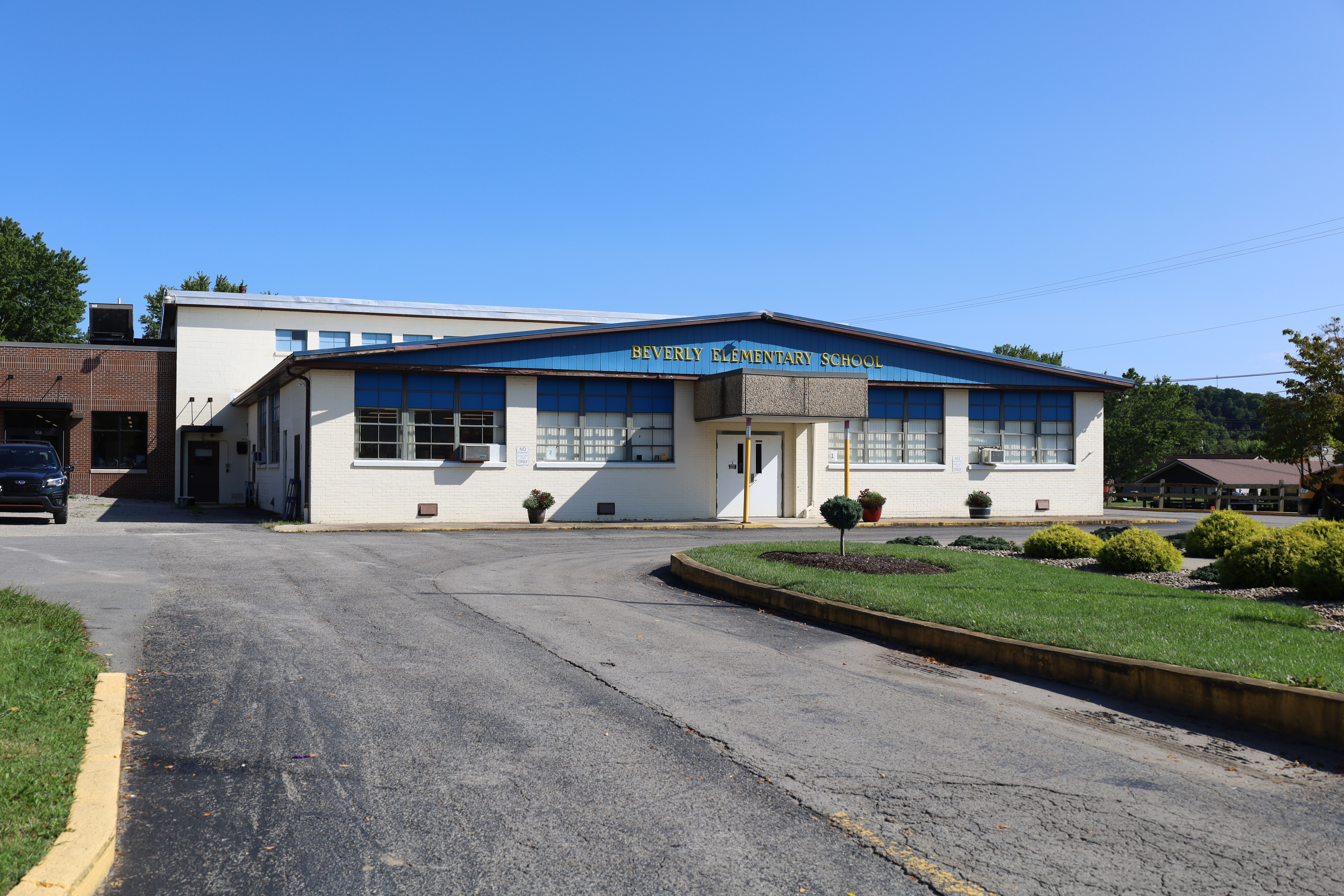
Beverly Elementary School in 2021

The first white settlers in the area that would become Beverly (and in fact in the whole of the Tygart Valley) arrived in 1753 when David Tygart (for whom the valley and river are named) and Robert Files (or Foyle) established cabins at separate choice spots. Although there had been no recent history of conflicts between whites and Indians in that immediate area, that summer a party of Indians traveling the Shawnee Trail discovered the Files cabin and killed seven members of the family. One son escaped and alerted the Tygart family, allowing all to escape. Thereafter, no other white settlement was attempted in present Randolph County until 1772.

On May 29, 1787, officers of the newly established Randolph County authorized local settler and landowner James Westfall, Sr (1747–1800) to plat out a town to accommodate a new county seat. The settlement was at first named Edmundton to further honor the namesake of the new county—Virginia Governor Edmund Randolph. In December 1790, however, the Virginia General Assembly officially established the town as “Beverley”. By this time, Randolph's first cousin (once removed), Beverley Randolph, was governor and the town was accordingly renamed for him. (Apparently, without discussion, the third “e” was soon dropped from the name, and "Beverly" has been the conventional spelling ever since.)

The Assembly directed the citizens to erect “a dwelling house sixteen feet square with a brick or stone chimney.” The first houses, along with a courthouse, jail, and school, were all of the characteristic single-pen log structure. Randolph County was at this time much larger than today, encompassing all of present-day Tucker County, and parts of present-day Preston, Barbour, Upshur, Lewis, Braxton, Nicholas, Webster, and Pocahontas Counties.

Jacob Westfall (1761–1801), first cousin once removed of James Westfall, received permission in 1794 to erect a sawmill near the town. Soon frame houses had joined the original log structures. After the Staunton-Parkersburg Turnpike arrived (1841), the town developed rapidly as a regional center for transportation and trading. Both sides occupied Beverly at various times during the American Civil War (1861–65) and various buildings were pressed into service as hospitals or quarters. In January 1865 Confederate General Thomas L. Rosser took 300 men, crossed the Allegheny Mountains to Beverly in deep snow and bitter cold and surprised and captured two Union infantry regiments in their works there. Some 580 prisoners were taken. (Most of the men in Rosser's command were recruits from [West] Virginia.) Rosser's troops partially burnt the Beverly Covered Bridge (built 1846–47), the earliest of Lemuel Chenoweth's celebrated wooden covered bridges, but Chenoweth rebuilt it in 1872 and '73.

Beverly lost its preeminence as county seat in 1899 to the rapidly developing railroad and timbering center of Elkins. In 1980 the entire town was entered on the National Register of Historic Places as a historic district. Today, a number of Beverly’s more historic structures have been restored.

== Geography ==
Beverly is located at 38°51′2″N 79°52′3″W (38.850600, -79.867444).

According to the United States Census Bureau, the town has a total area of 0.45 square miles (1.17 km^{2}), all land.

=== Climate ===
This climatic region is typified by large seasonal temperature differences, with warm to hot (and often humid) summers and cold (sometimes severely cold) winters. According to the Köppen Climate Classification system, Beverly has a humid continental climate, abbreviated "Dfb" on climate maps.

== Demographics ==
Historical population
Census	Pop.	Note	%±
1880	235		—
1890	343		46.0%
1900	464		35.3%
1910	438		−5.6%
1920	442		0.9%
1930	431		−2.5%
1940	484		12.3%
1950	515		6.4%
1960	441		−14.4%
1970	470		6.6%
1980	475		1.1%
1990	696		46.5%
2000	651		−6.5%
2010	702		7.8%
2020	622		−11.4%
2021 (est.)	623	▲	0.2%
U.S. Decennial Census

=== 2010 census ===
As of the census of 2010, there were 702 people, 323 households, and 199 families living in the town. The population density was 1,560.0 inhabitants per square mile (602.3/km^{2}). There were 360 housing units at an average density of 800.0 per square mile (308.9/km^{2}). The racial makeup of the town was 98.0% White, 0.1% African American, 0.4% Native American, and 1.4% from two or more races. Hispanic or Latino of any race were 0.3% of the population.

There were 323 households, of which 30.3% had children under the age of 18 living with them, 36.2% were married couples living together, 21.7% had a female householder with no husband present, 3.7% had a male householder with no wife present, and 38.4% were non-families. 33.4% of all households were made up of individuals, and 13.3% had someone living alone who was 65 years of age or older. The average household size was 2.17 and the average family size was 2.75.

The median age in the town was 40.5 years. 24.4% of residents were under the age of 18; 8.1% were between the ages of 18 and 24; 22.5% were from 25 to 44; 27.5% were from 45 to 64; and 17.4% were 65 years of age or older. The gender makeup of the town was 46.6% male and 53.4% female.

=== 2000 census ===
As of the census of 2000, there were 651 people, 285 households, and 190 families living in the town. The population density was 1,473.4 inhabitants per square mile (571.3/km^{2}). There were 313 housing units at an average density of 708.4 per square mile (274.7/km^{2}). The racial makeup of the town was 98.77% White, 0.31% Native American, 0.46% Asian, and 0.46% from two or more races. Hispanic or Latino of any race were 1.08% of the population.

There were 285 households, out of which 36.1% had children under the age of 18 living with them, 41.1% were married couples living together, 19.6% had a female householder with no husband present, and 33.3% were non-families. 28.8% of all households were made up of individuals, and 12.3% had someone living alone who was 65 years of age or older. The average household size was 2.25 and the average family size was 2.71.

In the town, the population was spread out, with 24.4% under the age of 18, 10.9% from 18 to 24, 26.3% from 25 to 44, 26.0% from 45 to 64, and 12.4% who were 65 years of age or older. The median age was 36 years. For every 100 females there were 86.5 males. For every 100 females age 18 and over, there were 75.7 males.

The median income for a household in the town was $21,875, and the median income for a family was $24,722. Males had a median income of $25,714 versus $16,250 for females. The per capita income for the town was $15,620. About 27.4% of families and 31.4% of the population were below the poverty line, including 40.0% of those under age 18 and 34.7% of those age 65 or over.
