= Barrackville, West Virginia =

- Town
- Location of Barrackville in Marion County, West Virginia.
- Coordinates: 39°30′10″N 80°10′11″W
- Country: United States
- State: West Virginia
- County: Marion
- Established: 1771
- Incorporated: 1968

Government
  - Mayor: David Tonkin
  - Town Council: Jeff Mullenax; Dewey Ice; Bill Greathouse; Charlie Moore; Roy L. Meeks III

Area
  - Total: 0.71 sq mi (1.83 km^{2})
  - Land: 0.69 sq mi (1.79 km^{2})
  - Water: 0.019 sq mi (0.05 km^{2})
- Elevation: 945 ft (288 m)

Population (2020)
  - Total: 1,201
  - Estimate (2021): 1,206
  - Density: 1,855.1/sq mi (716.25/km^{2})
- Time zone: UTC-5 (Eastern (EST))
  - Summer (DST): UTC-4 (EDT)
- ZIP code: 26559
- Area code: 304
- FIPS code: 54-04612
- GNIS feature ID: 1553805
- Website: local.wv.gov/barrackville/Pages/default.aspx

Barrackville is a town in Marion County, West Virginia, United States. The population was 1,211 at the 2020 census.

Barrackville was settled beginning in 1767 by William Galloway "Indian Billy" Ice. The town was named in honor of John Barrack, an early settler. It was established in 1771 and incorporated on January 25, 1968.

== Geography ==
Barrackville is located along Buffalo Creek.

According to the United States Census Bureau, the town has a total area of 0.71 square miles (1.84 km^{2}), of which 0.69 square miles (1.79 km^{2}) is land and 0.02 square miles (0.05 km^{2}) is water.

== Demographics ==
Historical population
Census	Pop.	Note	%±
1860	91		—
1870	114		25.3%
1880	99		−13.2%
1970	1,545		—
1980	1,815		17.5%
1990	1,443		−20.5%
2000	1,288		−10.7%
2010	1,302		1.1%
2020	1,201		−7.8%
2021 (est.)	1,206	▲	0.4%
U.S. Decennial Census

=== 2010 census ===
As of the census of 2010, there were 1,302 people, 544 households, and 372 families living in the town. The population density was 1,887.0 inhabitants per square mile (728.6/km^{2}). There were 602 housing units at an average density of 872.5 per square mile (336.9/km^{2}). The racial makeup of the town was 94.2% White, 4.0% African American, 0.2% Native American, 0.5% Asian, and 1.2% from two or more races. Hispanic or Latino of any race were 1.0% of the population.

There were 544 households, of which 29.2% had children under the age of 18 living with them, 52.9% were married couples living together, 11.6% had a female householder with no husband present, 3.9% had a male householder with no wife present, and 31.6% were non-families. 26.5% of all households were made up of individuals, and 13.6% had someone living alone who was 65 years of age or older. The average household size was 2.39 and the average family size was 2.91.

The median age in the town was 41.5 years. 21.3% of residents were under the age of 18; 6.7% were between the ages of 18 and 24; 26.7% were from 25 to 44; 27.2% were from 45 to 64; and 18% were 65 years of age or older. The gender makeup of the town was 49.2% male and 50.8% female.

=== 2000 census ===
As of the census of 2000, there were 1,288 people, 534 households, and 373 families living in the town. The population density was 1,863.0 inhabitants per square mile (720.7/km^{2}). There were 587 housing units at an average density of 849.0 per square mile (328.5/km^{2}). The racial makeup of the town was 95.03% White, 3.88% African American, 0.16% Native American, 0.08% Asian, 0.08% from other races, and 0.78% from two or more races. Hispanic or Latino of any race were 0.54% of the population.

There were 534 households, out of which 28.3% had children under the age of 18 living with them, 55.4% were married couples living together, 11.2% had a female householder with no husband present, and 30.1% were non-families. 26.4% of all households were made up of individuals, and 14.6% had someone living alone who was 65 years of age or older. The average household size was 2.41 and the average family size was 2.90.

In the town, the population was spread out, with 23.0% under the age of 18, 6.8% from 18 to 24, 28.6% from 25 to 44, 24.6% from 45 to 64, and 16.9% who were 65 years of age or older. The median age was 40 years. For every 100 females, there were 87.8 males. For every 100 females age 18 and over, there were 82.0 males.

The median income for a household in the town was $31,587, and the median income for a family was $42,969. Males had a median income of $26,354 versus $21,786 for females. The per capita income for the town was $18,506. About 8.2% of families and 8.6% of the population were below the poverty line, including 12.4% of those under age 18 and 5.6% of those age 65 or over.

== See also ==
- Barrackville Covered Bridge
