= U.S. Route 250 =

Highway in the United States

U.S. Route 250
- US 250 highlighted in red

Route information
- Auxiliary route of US 50
- Length: 514 mi (827 km)
- Existed: 1928–present

Major junctions
- West end: US 6 in Sandusky, OH
- I-80 / I-90 / Ohio Turnpike near Milan, OH; I-71 near Ashland, OH; I-77 near Strasburg, OH; I-70 / WV 2 in Wheeling, WV; I-470 in Wheeling, WV; I-79 near Fairmont, WV; US 50 in Pruntytown, WV; I-81 near Staunton, VA; I-64 near Waynesboro, VA; I-95 in Richmond, VA
- East end: US 360 in Richmond, VA

Location
- Country: United States
- States: Ohio, West Virginia, Virginia

Highway system
- United States Numbered Highway System; List; Special; Divided
← SR 249	OH	→ SR 250
← WV 230	WV	→ WV 251

U.S. Route 250 (US 250) is a route of the United States Numbered Highway System, and is a spur of U.S. Route 50. It currently runs for 514 miles (827 km) from Richmond, Virginia, to Sandusky, Ohio. It passes through the states of Virginia, West Virginia, and Ohio. It goes through the cities of Richmond, Charlottesville, Staunton, and Waynesboro, Virginia; and Wheeling, West Virginia. West of Pruntytown, West Virginia, US 250 intersects and forms a short overlap with its parent US 50.

In Virginia and Ohio, the route is signed east–west. In West Virginia, the route is signed north–south.

== Route description ==
=== Ohio ===
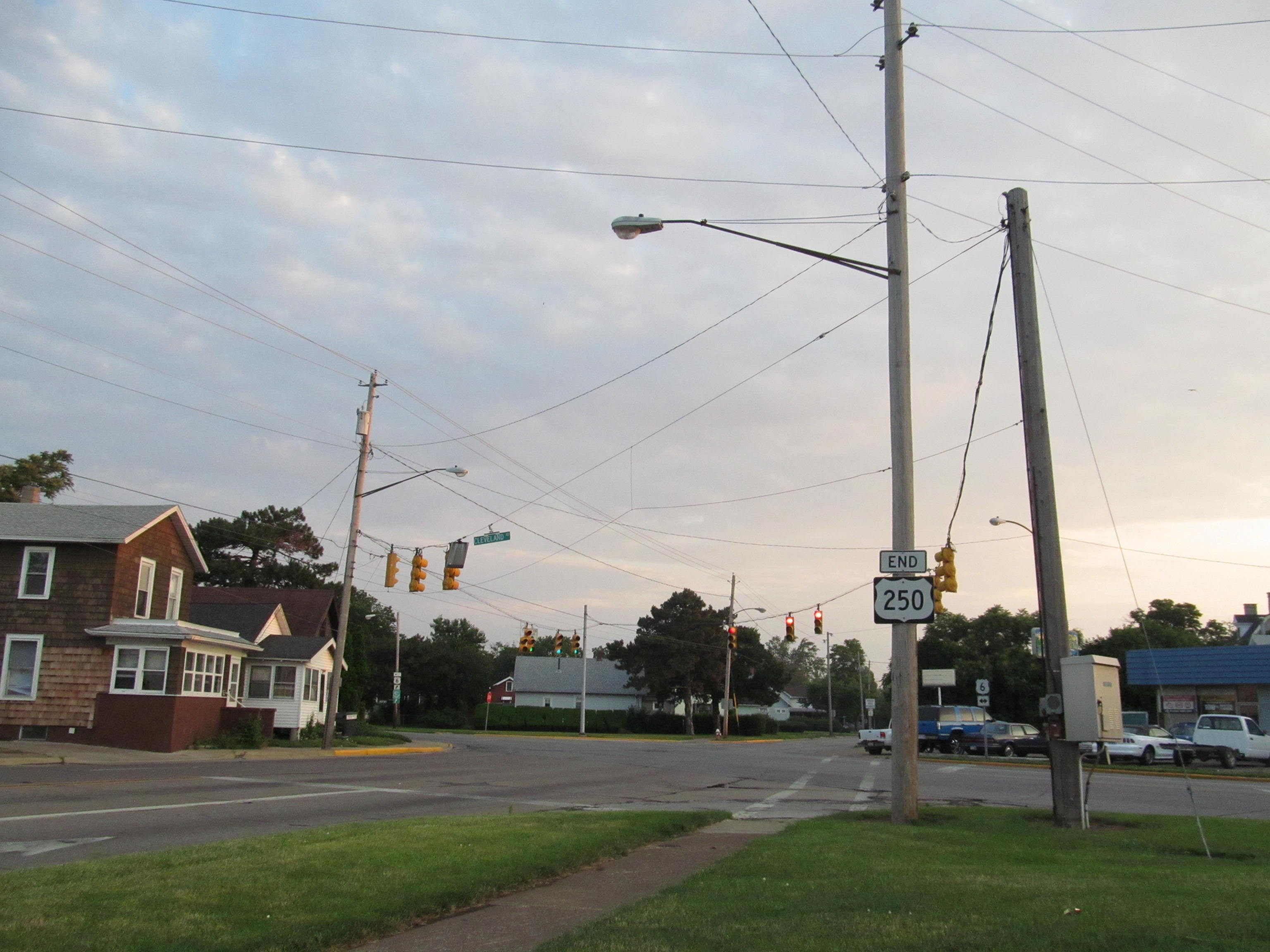
Western terminus at US 6 in Sandusky, OH

In Ohio, U.S. 250 is an important cross-state corridor linking Sandusky (on Lake Erie) to Bridgeport (on the Ohio River). From a regional/traffic perspective, the route can roughly be divided into five sections linking major regions and routes of the state:

- US 6 in Sandusky to US 20 at Norwalk
- US 20 at Norwalk to US 30 at Wooster
- US 30 at Wooster to I-77 at Strasburg
- I-77 at New Philadelphia to US 22 at Cadiz
- US 22 at Cadiz to I-70 at Bridgeport

=== West Virginia ===
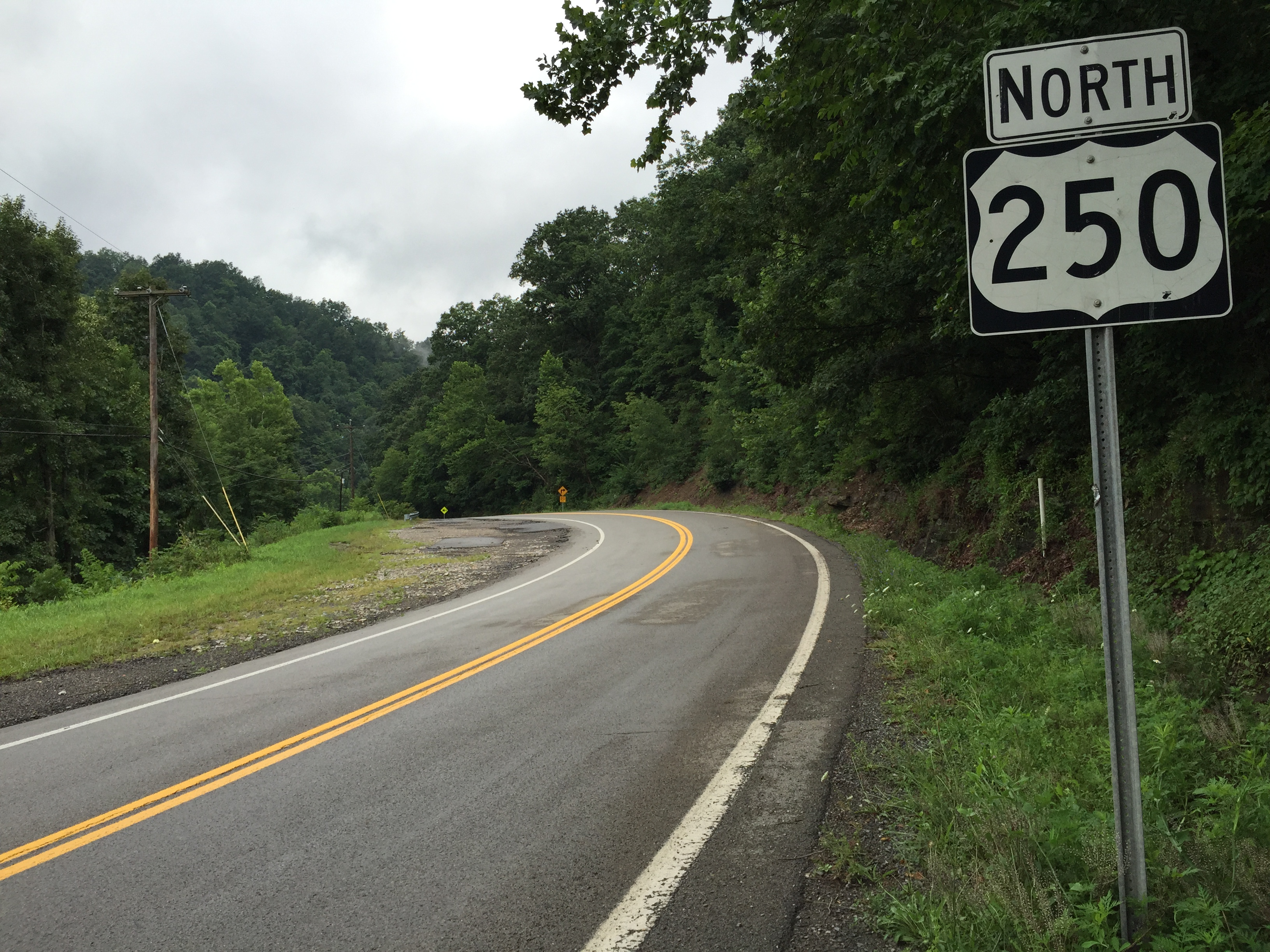
View north along US 250 in rural northern West Virginia

U.S. 250's northern entrance into West Virginia is via the Military Order of the Purple Heart Bridge from Bridgeport, Ohio onto Wheeling Island. It is briefly co-signed with U.S. Route 40. The route additionally co-signs with Interstate 70 and crosses the Ohio River on the Fort Henry Bridge in Wheeling, West Virginia. U.S. Route 250 then exits I-70 east of the Wheeling Tunnel and joins West Virginia Route 2 one mile (1.6 km) later. In Moundsville, West Virginia, the route leaves WV 2 and departs toward Cameron, Mannington, and Fairmont. It intersects with its parent route, U.S. Route 50, two miles west of Grafton in Pruntytown and continues southward, co-signed with U.S. Route 119 for 12 miles. The route moves through Philippi, and finally through Elkins. U.S. Route 250 intersects with U.S. Route 33 and U.S. Route 219 briefly in Elkins, which is the last major hub before U.S. Route 250 winds its way through the Appalachian Mountains to the Virginia border.

U.S. 250 in West Virginia includes the Philippi Covered Bridge at Philippi, the only covered bridge on the United States Numbered Highway System.

==== Philippi truck route ====
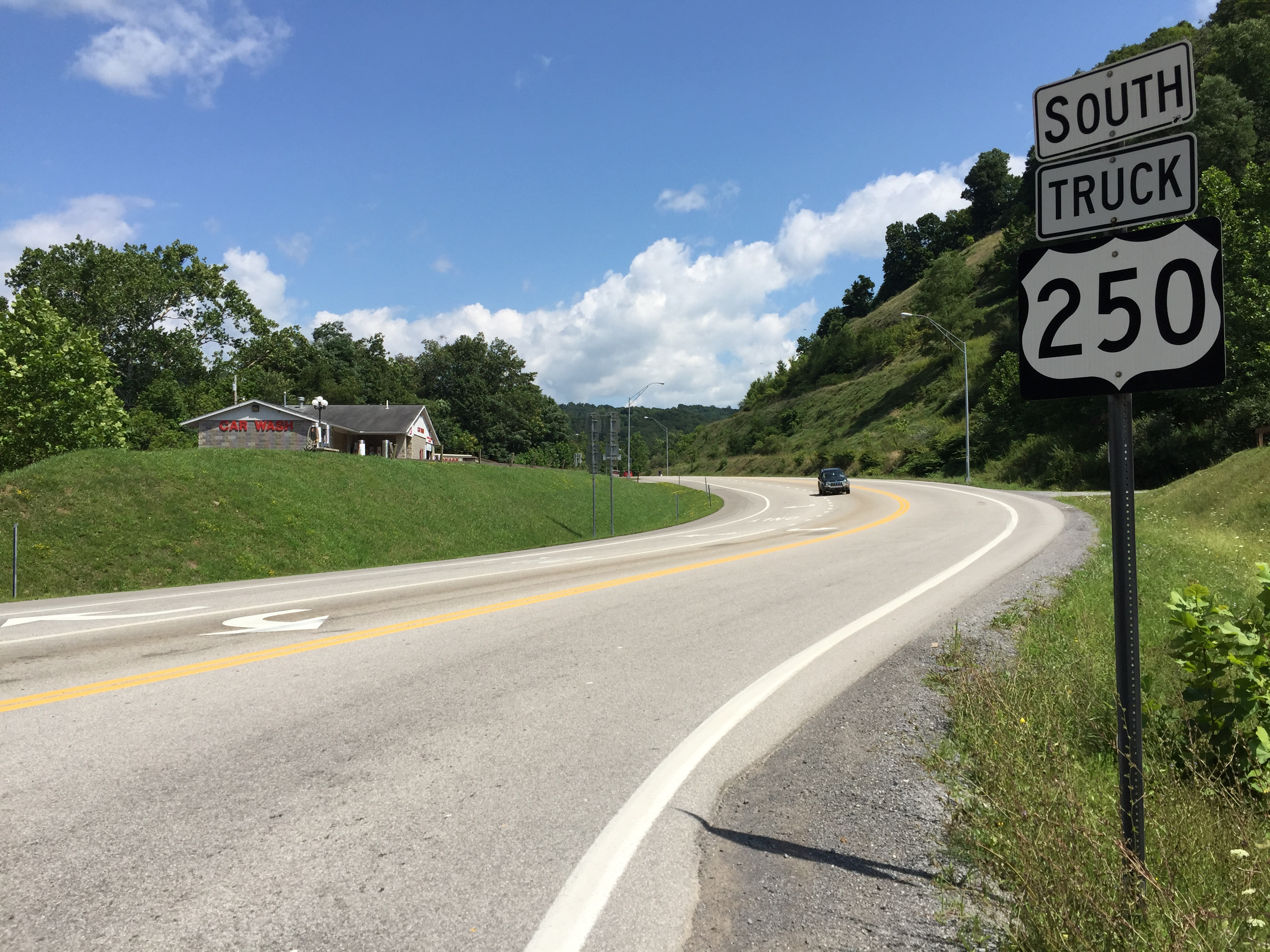
View south along US 250 Truck in Philippi

U.S. Route 250 Truck follows Blue and Gray Expressway around the south and west sides of downtown Philippi, avoiding the covered bridge.

=== Virginia ===
US 250 runs 166.74 miles (268.34 km) from the West Virginia state line near Hightown east to its eastern terminus at US 360 in Richmond. US 250 is the main east–west highway of Highland County, which is known as Virginia's Little Switzerland; the highway follows the path of the 19th century Staunton and Parkersburg Turnpike. From Staunton east to Richmond, the U.S. Highway serves as the local complement to Interstate 64 (I-64), roughly following the 18th century Three Notch'd Road through Waynesboro and Charlottesville on its way through the Shenandoah Valley, its crossing of the Blue Ridge Mountains at Rockfish Gap, and the Piedmont. In the Richmond metropolitan area, US 250 is known as Broad Street, a major thoroughfare through the city's West End and downtown areas.

== History ==
=== Earlier roads, funding conflicts ===
Between Short Pump and Staunton, U.S. 250 largely follows the routing of the Three Notch'd Road (or the Three Chopt Road), which had been established in the Colony of Virginia between Richmond and the Shenandoah Valley by the 1740s. Most likely, the road followed an ancient Monacan trail from Orapax (east of Richmond) to the western Shenandoah Valley. This well-planned route required only one major river crossing, the Rivanna at Charlottesville, with inns or taverns spaced about 10 miles (16 km) apart.

The route west of Staunton was built about 100 years later as a toll road, the Staunton-Parkersburg Turnpike. In the second quarter of the 19th century, it became a major gateway into Virginia's "Trans-Allegheny" region, which presented much greater challenges to transportation than did less rugged portions of the state. In that region, navigable waterways were unavailable and canals impractical. Wheeled vehicles in the form of wagons, and later, motor vehicles needed to pass through with passengers and freight. It became part of the main trade route for salt and other commodities in the early 19th century. As the American Civil War broke out, the route became very important and was defended by Stonewall Jackson's troops at the Battle of McDowell in 1862.

The portion of the Staunton-Parkersburg Turnpike west of Allegheny Mountain (almost all of it) became part of West Virginia in 1863. Virginia's pre-War debt became a major issue after the American Civil War, as millions of dollars of debt remained for infrastructure improvements, some of which were now located in the new state of West Virginia, including most of the Staunton-Parkersburg Turnpike. Political divisions in Virginia on this issue resulted in creation of a new major political group in the late 1870s, the Readjuster Party, a coalition of Democrats, Republicans, and African-Americans seeking a reduction in Virginia's prewar debt by allocating an appropriate portion to the new State of West Virginia.

For several decades, Virginia and West Virginia disputed the new state's share of the Virginia government's debt. The issue was finally settled in 1915, when the United States Supreme Court ruled that West Virginia owed Virginia $12,393,929.50. The final installment of this sum was paid off in 1939.

=== U.S. Highway system, numbering ===
U.S. Route 250 was created in 1928 and was originally routed from U.S. Route 50 in Grafton, West Virginia, north/west to U.S. Route 20 in Norwalk, Ohio. In 1932, the route was expanded north/west to Sandusky, Ohio. In 1934, the route was expanded southward and eastward to Richmond, Virginia.

== Major intersections ==
Ohio
US 6 in Sandusky
I-80 / I-90 north-northwest of Milan
US 20 in Norwalk
US 42 in Ashland. The highways travel concurrently through Ashland.
I-71 east of Ashland
US 30 west-southwest of Wooster. The highways travel concurrently to southeast of Wooster.
US 62 in Wilmot. The highways travel concurrently through Wilmot.
I-77 south-southeast of Strasburg. The highways travel concurrently to New Philadelphia.
US 36 in Uhrichsville
US 22 in Cadiz. The highways travel concurrently through Cadiz.
US 40 in Bridgeport. The highways travel concurrently to Wheeling, West Virginia.
West Virginia
I-70 on Wheeling Island. The highways travel concurrently to Wheeling.
I-470 in Wheeling
US 19 in Fairmont. The highways travel concurrently through Fairmont.
I-79 in White Hall
US 50 west-southwest of Prunytown. The highways travel concurrently to Prunytown.
US 119 north-northwest of Webster. The highways travel concurrently to Philippi.
US 33 north of Norton. The highways travel concurrently to Elkins.
US 219 north of Elkins. The highways travel concurrently to Huttonsville.
Virginia
US 220 in Monterey
US 11 in Staunton. The highways travel concurrently through Staunton.
I-81 in Staunton
US 340 in Waynesboro
US 340 in Waynesboro. The highways travel concurrently through Waynesboro.
I-64 in Rockfish Gap
I-64 in Yancey Mills
US 29 west-northwest of Charlottesville. The highways travel concurrently to Charlottesville.
I-64 east-southeast of Charlottesville
US 15 in Zion X-Roads
US 522 in Gum Spring
I-64 east-southeast of Short Pump
I-64 in Dumbarton
US 33 in Richmond. The highways travel concurrently through the city.
US 1 / US 301 in Richmond
I-95 in Richmond
US 360 in Richmond

Browse numbered routes
← WV 230	list	→ WV 251
