= Mister Bee Potato Chips =

American brand of potato chips

- Product type: potato chips, potato sticks
- Current owner: West Virginia Potato Chip Company, LLC
- Country: Parkersburg, West Virginia
- Introduced: 1951
- Markets: West Virginia, Ohio, Western Kentucky
- Website: www.misterbee.com

Mister Bee Potato Chips is an American brand of potato chips produced in Parkersburg, West Virginia, the only potato chip manufacturer in West Virginia. Founded in 1951 by Leo and Sara Klein as a small local business, the company was family-owned until 2010. It is now incorporated as West Virginia Potato Chip Company, LLC, and since 2015 has been owned by Mary Anne Ketelson and partners.

== History ==
Leo and Sara Klein founded Mister Bee Potato Chips in 1951, initially making the chips in the morning and delivering them in the afternoon. The company moved to its current site in 1962 and was a million-dollar company by the end of 1972. Leo Klein was succeeded as head of the company in 1979 by his son Alan, who took the title of CEO in 1988, and by 2010 Alan Klein's son Doug was President and COO.

In 2010, the company experienced financial difficulties after losing distribution contracts. In late 2011, production was reduced and then stopped and the company entered Chapter 11 bankruptcy. In 2012 it was purchased by Randall Holden and James Richard Barton, and Christie Mallett replaced Doug Klein as company president. Holden subsequently took over as president. After a fire damaged the production plant in March 2013, the company renovated.

Mister Bee Potato Chip Company became West Virginia Potato Chip Company by 2013. In September 2015 it was purchased by Mary Anne (Welch) Ketelsen, Douglas Ketelsen, James Richard Barton, Gregory Barton, and Gregory Reed, and additional financing from Mary Maxine Welch. Reed became president. Mary Anne Ketelson, as majority owner, took over operations in 2018 and new equipment was installed that made possible an increase in production. An expansion of the plant received initial approval in 2020. As of June 2021 the company had 47 employees. As of May 2023, Kevin Holden (no relation to Randall Holden), founder and CEO of Bite Brands of Atlanta, Ga., became majority owner. Mary Anne Ketelsen will remain as an owner of the company.

== Products and distribution ==
West Virginia Potato Chip Company is the only remaining potato chip manufacturer in West Virginia, and formerly used the slogan "200 miles fresher" to emphasize that its chips were not shipped into the state from elsewhere. It sells Mister Bee potato chips in West Virginia, Ohio, and Kentucky as well as online; in July–September 2021, distribution was expanded temporarily to Washington, D.C., Maryland, and Virginia. As of August 2021 it produces eight varieties of potato chips, original, sour cream and onion, barbecue, dip style, cheddar sour cream, honey barbecue, jalapeño, and salt and vinegar, and also potato sticks; it also produces chips for other brands.

In 2023, Mister Bee introduced West Virginia-themed chips, such as Pepperoni Roll and "304-style."

== See also ==
- List of brand name snack foods
