= Fairmont, West Virginia =

City in the United States

- City
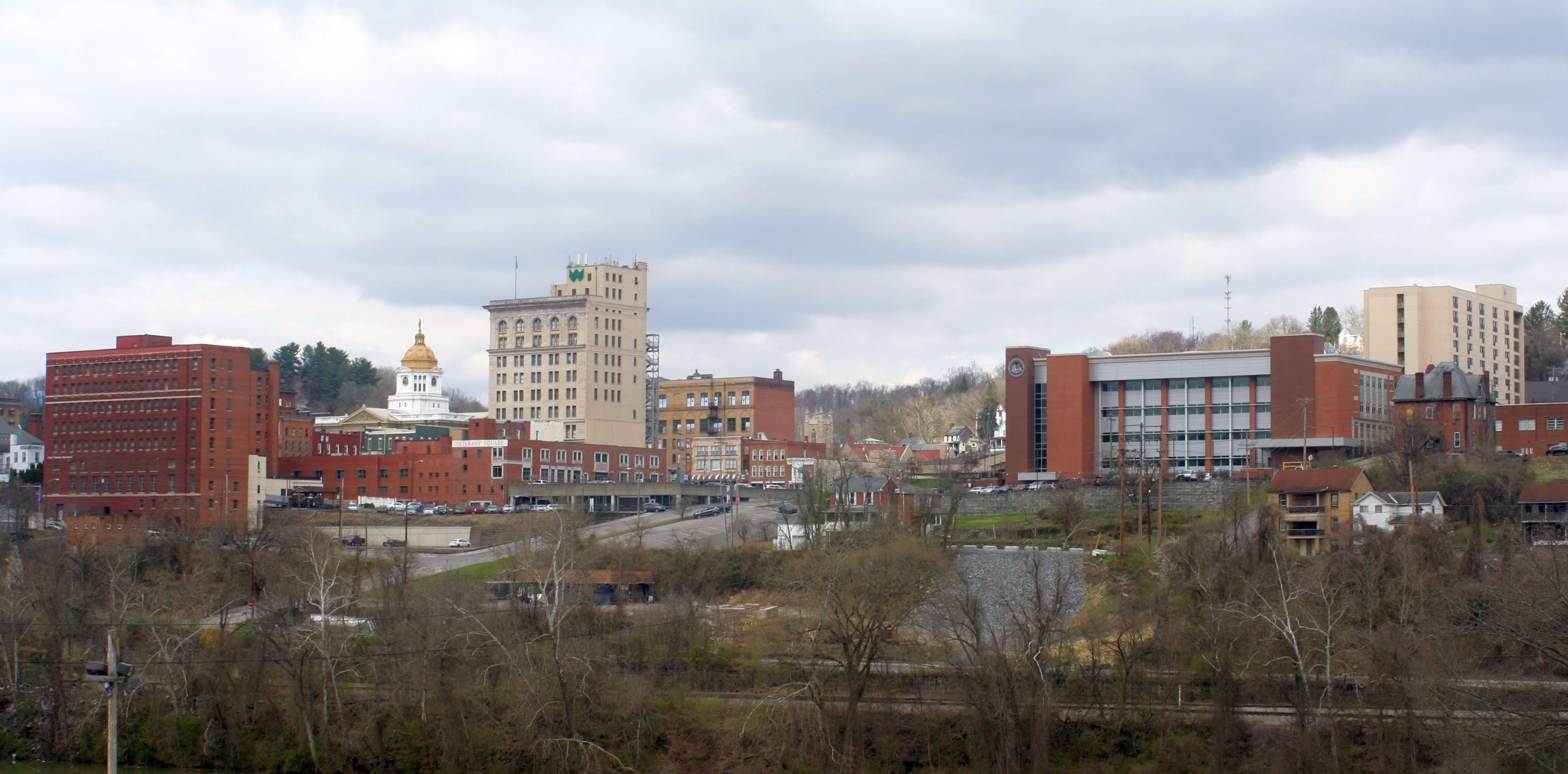
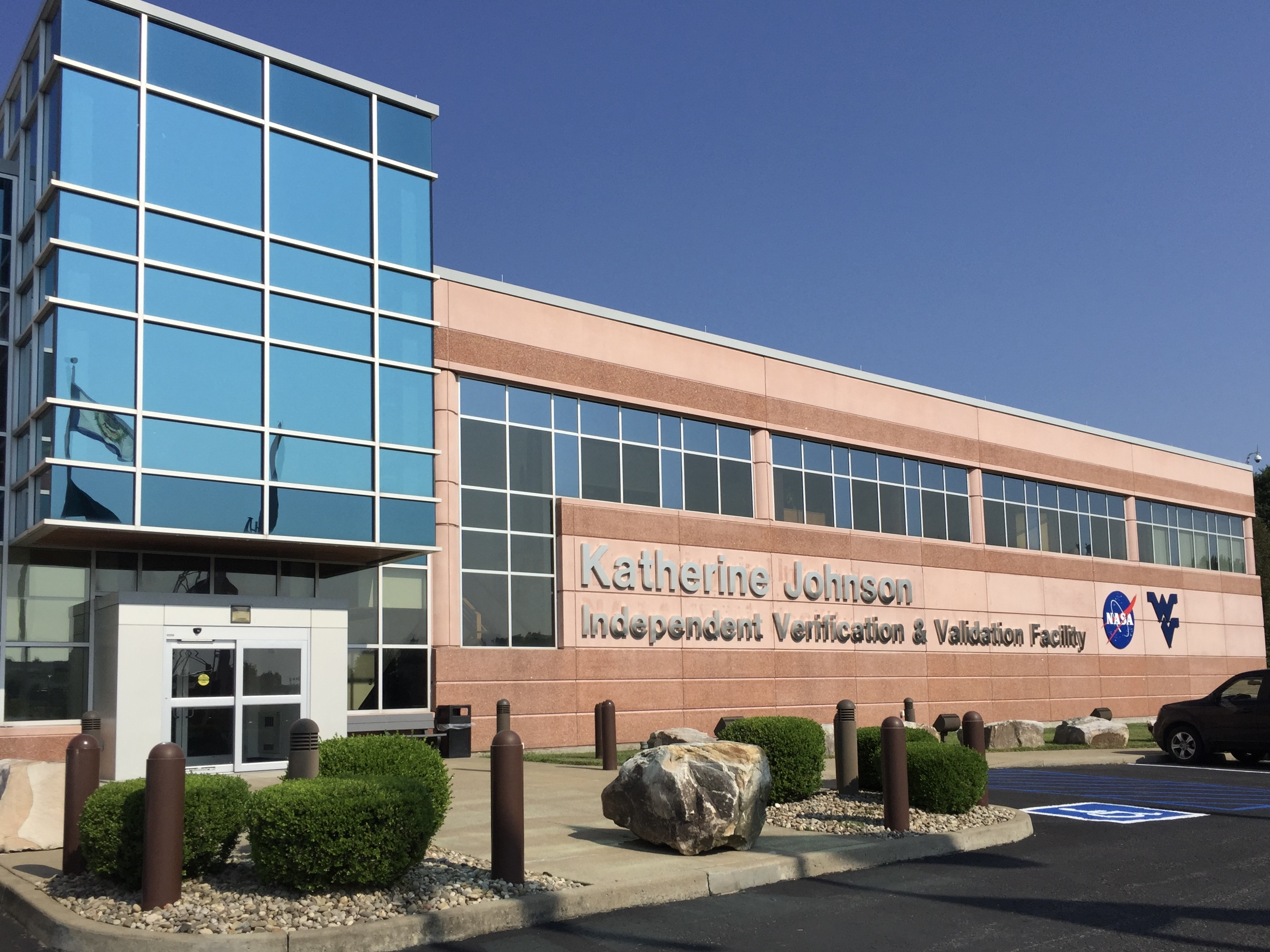
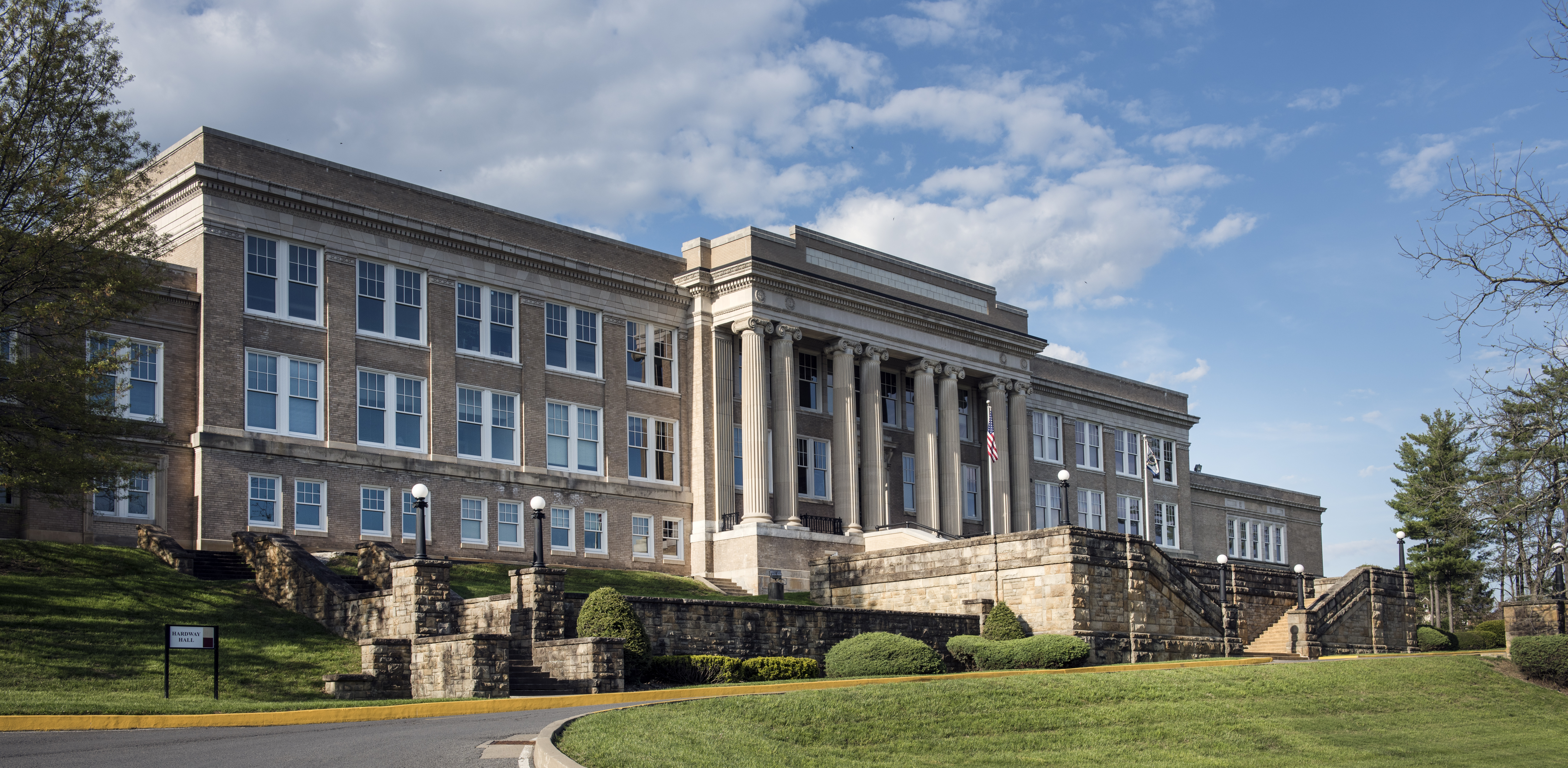
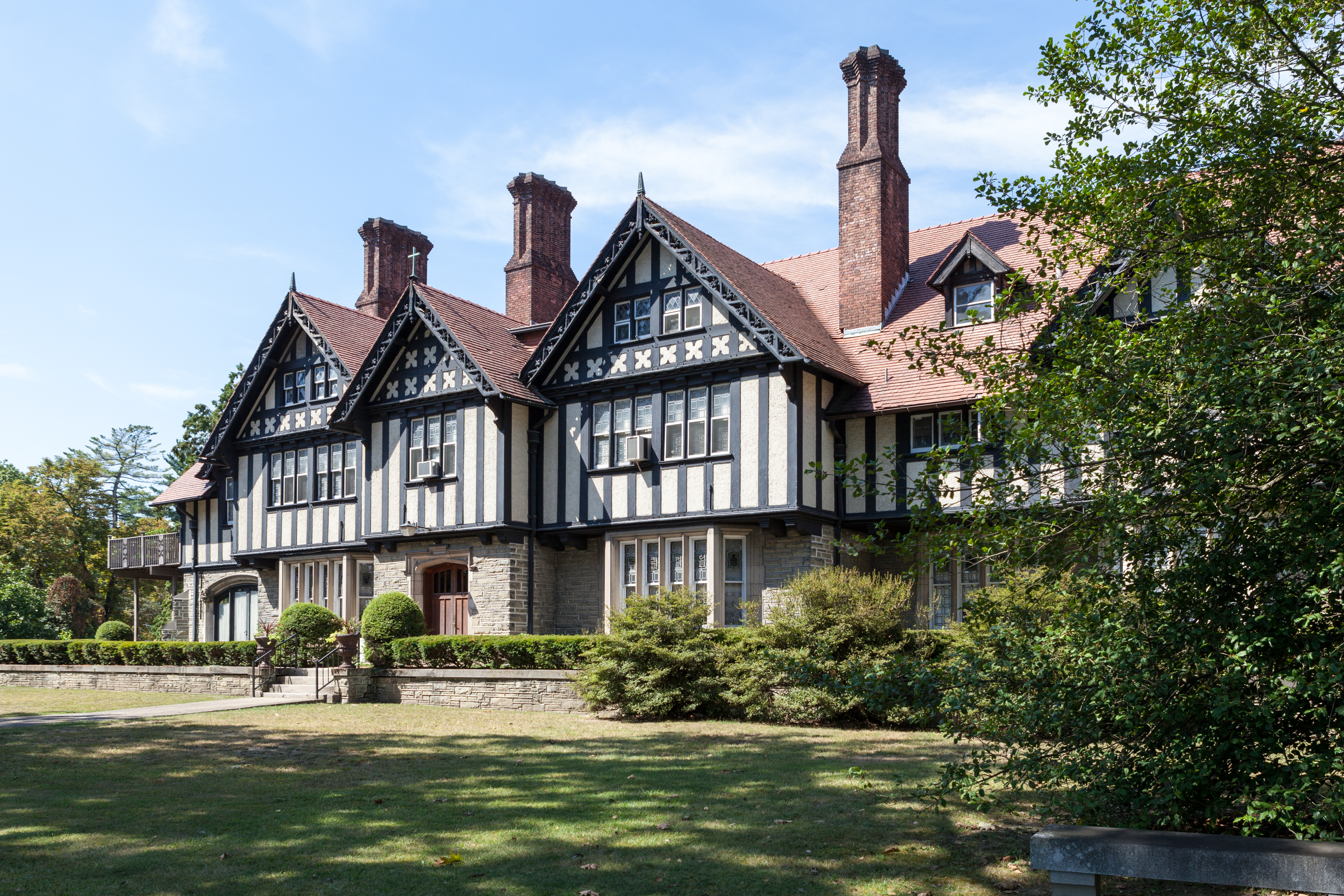
- Downtown Fairmont Marion County Courthouse NASA IV&V Facility Fairmont State University High Gate

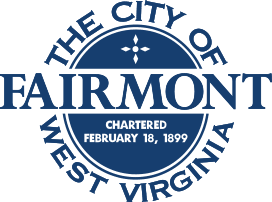
- Flag Seal
- Nickname: Friendly City
- Motto: "Spend a Day... Spend a Lifetime"
- Interactive map of Fairmont, West Virginia
- Location within West Virginia Location within the United States
- Coordinates: 39°28′53″N 80°8′36″W
- Country: United States
- State: West Virginia
- County: Marion
- Settled: 1819
- Incorporated (town): 1820
- Incorporated (city): 1899
- Founder: Boaz Fleming
- Named for: The town's overlook of the Monongahela River

Government
  - Type: Council-manager government
  - Mayor: Anne Bolyard
  - Deputy Mayor: Josh Rice
  - City Manager: Travis L. Blosser

Area
  - Total: 8.98 sq mi (23.27 km^{2})
  - Land: 8.60 sq mi (22.28 km^{2})
  - Water: 0.38 sq mi (0.99 km^{2})
- Elevation: 980 ft (300 m)

Population (2020)
  - Total: 18,416
  - Estimate (2021): 18,209
  - Density: 2,137.7/sq mi (825.36/km^{2})
- Time zone: UTC−5 (Eastern (EST))
  - Summer (DST): UTC−4 (EDT)
- ZIP codes: 26554-26555
- Area code: 304
- FIPS code: 54-26452
- GNIS feature ID: 1560581
- Website: fairmontwv.gov

Fairmont is a city in Marion County, West Virginia, United States, and its county seat. The population was 18,313 at the 2020 census, making it the eighth-most populous city in the state. It is the principal city of the Fairmont micropolitan area, which includes all of Marion County in North Central West Virginia and had a population of 56,205 in 2020. Fairmont is also a principal city of the larger Morgantown–Fairmont combined statistical area. The city is home to Fairmont State University, serving more than 3,000 students.

== History ==
=== Early settlements ===
In the late 18th century, various subsistence farming settlements were established in the vicinity of the future Fairmont.

In 1789, Boaz Fleming, a Revolutionary War veteran, migrated to western Virginia and purchased a 254-acre farm from Jonathan Bozarth. In 1808, Fleming made his annual trek to Clarksburg to pay his brother's Harrison County taxes. While in Clarksburg, Fleming attended a social gathering that included his cousin Dolley Madison, wife of President James Madison. Fleming complained to Mrs. Madison about having to travel over a hundred miles each year from his home to pay his Monongalia County taxes and his brother's Harrison County taxes. Mrs. Madison supposedly suggested that he create his own county to save him all that travel. In 1814, Fleming circulated a petition to do precisely that, naming the proposed county Madison County in honor of Dolley and James Madison.

Milford, now Rivesville, was the only town within the borders of Fleming's proposed county, so Fleming decided to make Milford the seat of Madison County. However, Milford's citizens preferred to remain part of Monongalia County. As a result, Fleming's petition failed to gain sufficient support to be presented to the Virginia General Assembly. Fleming then focused on creating a new town near his farm, which was located on the west side of the Monongahela River. In 1817, Fleming's sons—William and David—began to clear land on a part of their father's farm to make way for the new town; this part of the farm would later become downtown Fairmont.

=== Modern history ===
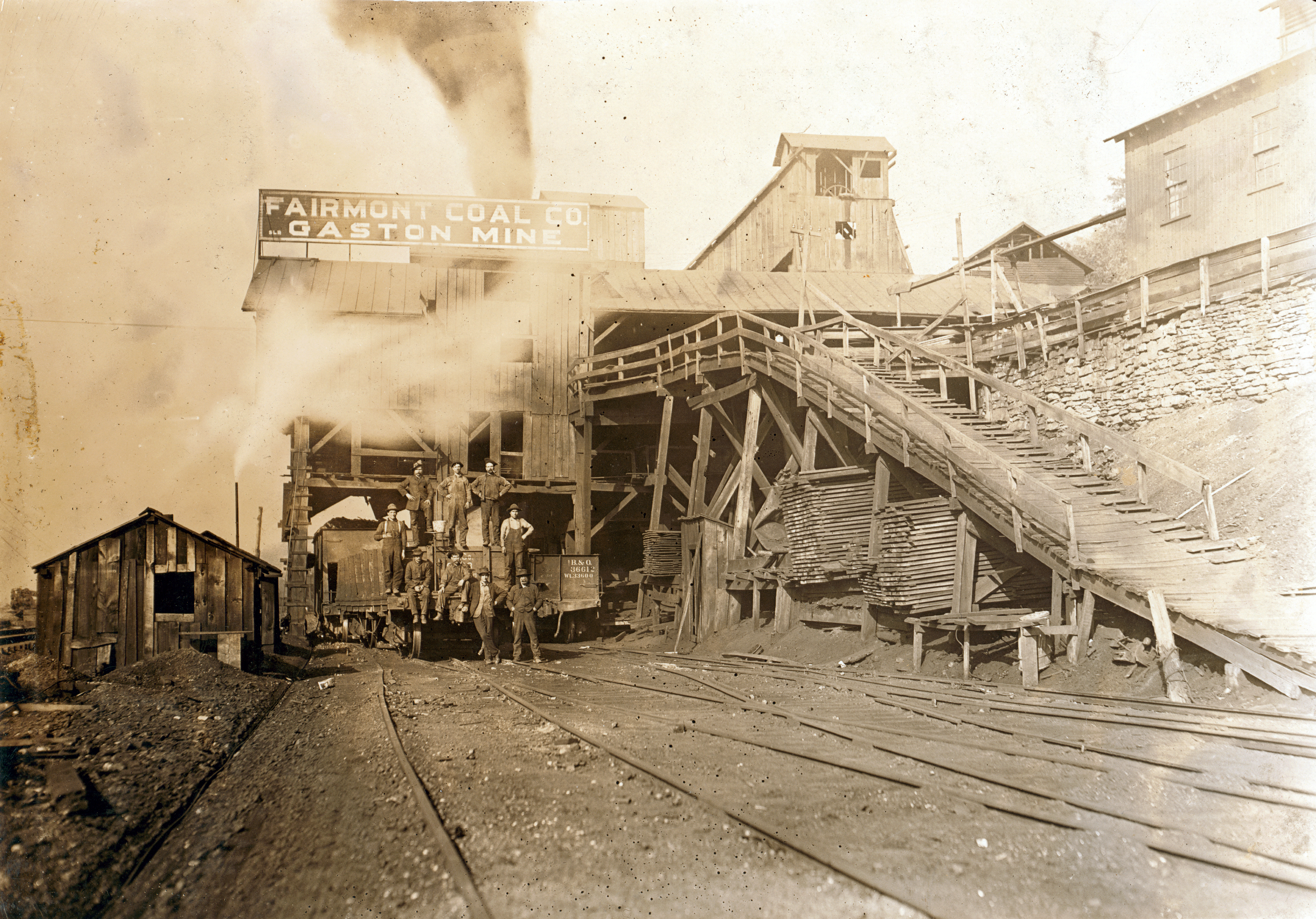
Coal tipple at Gaston mine, October 1908

In 1819, Fairmont was founded as Middletown, Virginia. It was named Middletown because either it was in the middle of two cities, Morgantown and Clarksburg, or Fleming's first wife, Elizabeth Hutchinson, was originally from Middletown, Delaware. That same year, a road was built between those two cities. Fleming's new town was about halfway between the two cities, which made it a resting point. The town was incorporated as Middletown on January 19, 1820.

The current borders of Marion County were established in 1842, and Middletown was named the county's seat. At that time, William Haymond Jr. suggested that the town's name be changed to Fairmont because the town had a beautiful overlook of the Monongahela River, giving it a "fair mount". The Borough of Fairmont was incorporated in 1843 by the Virginia General Assembly.

In 1863, during the American Civil War, Confederate General William E. Jones and his men raided Fairmont and cut the Union's supply lines to take food and horses. They also burned the books from the personal library of Governor Francis Harrison Pierpont.

Many of the first buildings in Fairmont were poorly constructed. By 1852—little more than 30 years after the city's founding—a large portion of Fairmont was reported to be run-down and dilapidated. Reports from 1873 indicate that these buildings had continued to fall into disrepair. On April 2, 1876, a fire destroyed a large portion of the city's business district, as well as many houses in the area. The continuing dilapidation of the city's buildings may have contributed to the fire; the large number of coal mines under Fairmont may have also played a role.

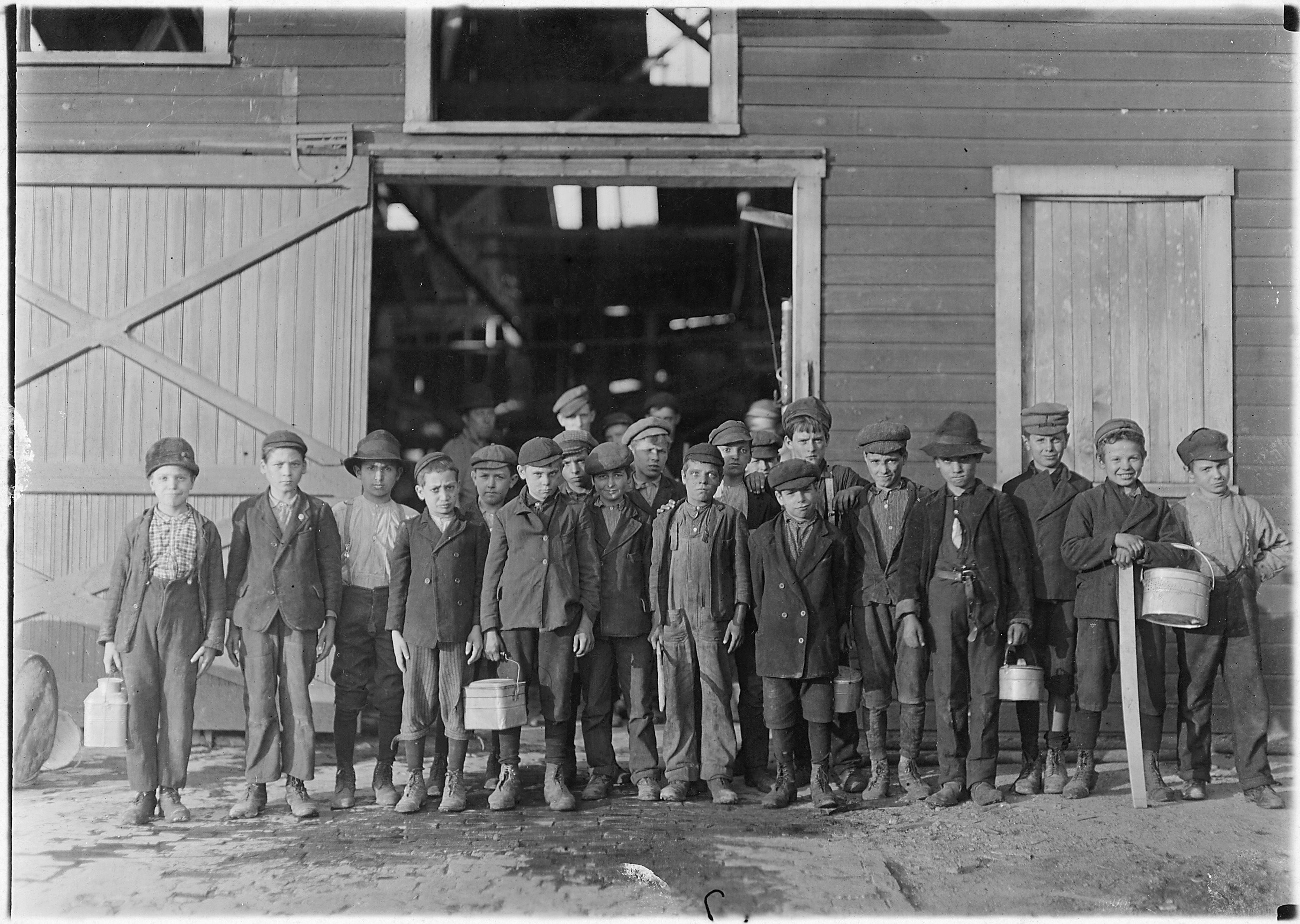
Child laborers at Monougal Glass Works in Fairmont, 1908. Photo by Lewis Hine.

Between 1891 and 1901—in a span of only 10 years—Fairmont's population had increased from 1,000 to 7,000. The City of Fairmont was chartered in 1899; as a result of the charter, the city absorbed the surrounding towns of Palatine (also known as East Side) and West Fairmont. By 1901, Fairmont was an important commercial center. Many railroads—including the Baltimore and Ohio Railroad on its way from Cumberland, Maryland to Wheeling—traveled through the city. By this time, Fairmont was also the leading center of the coal trade industry in northern West Virginia, employing some 10,000 workers in the coal mines around Fairmont.

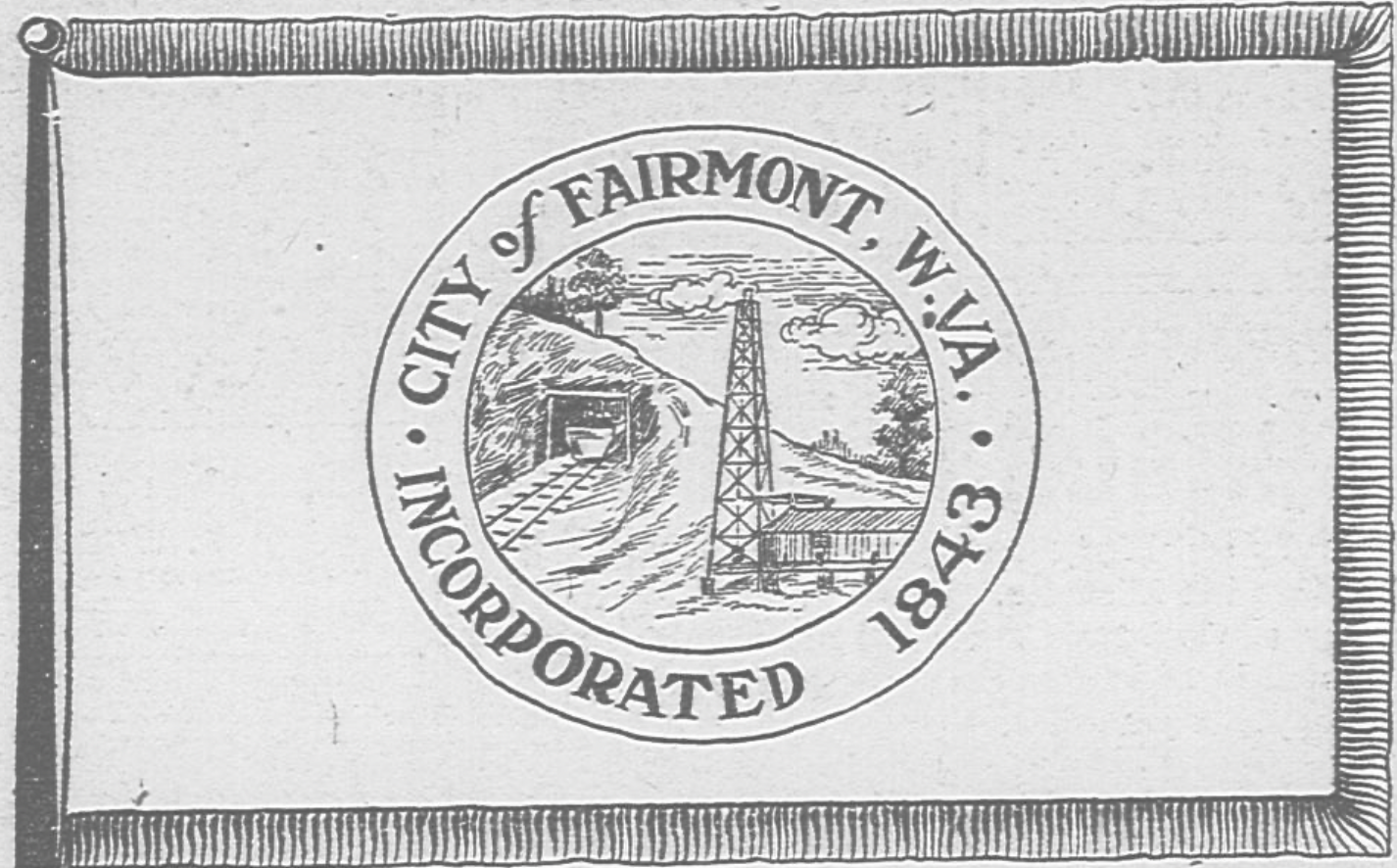
City flag from 1918

By 1978, an issue with Fairmont's land experiencing subsidence appeared because the remains of Fairmont's 19th-century coal mines were crumbling. As a result, over the following years, the federal government along with other institutions spent money to fix the subsidence issue to prevent damage to the town.

== Geography ==
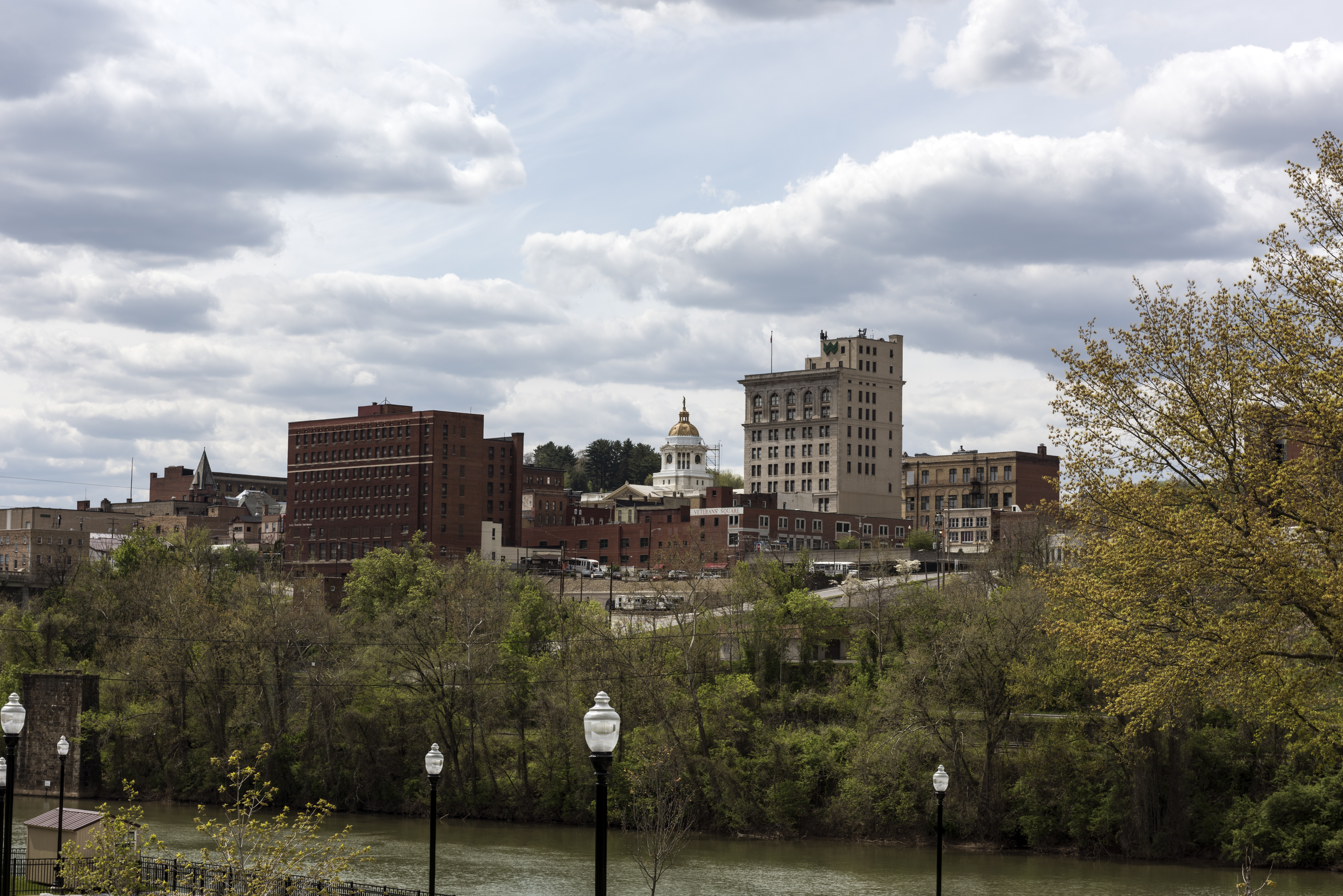
Downtown Fairmont viewed from across the Monongahela River

The Tygart Valley River and the West Fork River join in Fairmont to form the Monongahela River. Buffalo Creek, a tributary of the Monongahela River, flows through the northern part of the city.

According to the United States Census Bureau, the city has a total area of 9.00 square miles (23.31 km^{2}), of which 8.62 square miles (22.33 km^{2}) is land and 0.38 square miles (0.98 km^{2}) is water.

=== Climate ===
Fairmont lies on the border between a humid continental climate (Köppen Dfa) and humid subtropical climate (Köppen Cfa) with very warm summers and freezing winters. However, it is not uncommon during winter for warm air from the Gulf of Mexico to raise temperatures above 50 °F or 10 °C, which occurs on average six times each January and over eight in December and February. In contrast, when very cold air from Canada moves into West Virginia temperatures can go below 0 °F or −17.8 °C, which can be expected during 3.2 mornings each winter, but which occurred on twelve mornings during the extremely cold January 1977, whose average temperature of 16.0 °F or −8.9 °C was the coldest month on record by 4.0 °F or 2.2 °C. Despite the abundant precipitation throughout the year, the relative dryness of cold air means that most precipitation is rain even during the winter: 46.5 inches (1.18 m) being the highest monthly snowfall in November 1950, and the most in a season 77.4 inches (1.97 m) between July 1950 and June 1951. The least snow in a season has been 12.0 inches (0.30 m) between July 1918 and June 1919, whilst the wettest calendar year has been 1956 with 58.12 inches (1,476.2 mm) and the driest – as with all of West Virginia – 1930 with 26.25 inches (666.8 mm). The hottest temperature has been 108 °F (42.2 °C) on August 8, 1918, and the coldest −21 °F (−29.4 °C) on January 21, 1994.

Climate data for Fairmont, West Virginia (1991–2020 normals; extremes 1905–present)
Month	Jan	Feb	Mar	Apr	May	Jun	Jul	Aug	Sep	Oct	Nov	Dec	Year
Record high °F (°C)	81 (27)	79 (26)	91 (33)	95 (35)	100 (38)	103 (39)	105 (41)	108 (42)	101 (38)	93 (34)	84 (29)	75 (24)	108 (42)
Mean daily maximum °F (°C)	39.6 (4.2)	43.0 (6.1)	52.4 (11.3)	65.4 (18.6)	73.4 (23.0)	80.2 (26.8)	83.6 (28.7)	82.6 (28.1)	77.1 (25.1)	65.3 (18.5)	53.8 (12.1)	43.6 (6.4)	63.3 (17.4)
Daily mean °F (°C)	31.8 (−0.1)	34.3 (1.3)	42.5 (5.8)	53.9 (12.2)	62.5 (16.9)	70.0 (21.1)	73.6 (23.1)	72.6 (22.6)	66.4 (19.1)	54.9 (12.7)	44.7 (7.1)	36.1 (2.3)	53.6 (12.0)
Mean daily minimum °F (°C)	24.0 (−4.4)	25.5 (−3.6)	32.6 (0.3)	42.4 (5.8)	51.6 (10.9)	59.8 (15.4)	63.7 (17.6)	62.5 (16.9)	55.8 (13.2)	44.5 (6.9)	35.5 (1.9)	28.7 (−1.8)	43.9 (6.6)
Record low °F (°C)	−21 (−29)	−12 (−24)	−10 (−23)	10 (−12)	24 (−4)	35 (2)	42 (6)	36 (2)	29 (−2)	17 (−8)	1 (−17)	−16 (−27)	−21 (−29)
Average precipitation inches (mm)	3.81 (97)	3.22 (82)	4.21 (107)	3.90 (99)	5.09 (129)	4.67 (119)	4.91 (125)	3.80 (97)	3.85 (98)	3.43 (87)	3.15 (80)	3.73 (95)	47.77 (1,213)
Average snowfall inches (cm)	13.5 (34)	9.1 (23)	4.8 (12)	1.0 (2.5)	0.0 (0.0)	0.0 (0.0)	0.0 (0.0)	0.0 (0.0)	0.0 (0.0)	0.2 (0.51)	1.8 (4.6)	7.4 (19)	37.8 (96)
Average precipitation days (≥ 0.01 in)	15.0	12.8	12.7	13.5	14.4	12.1	12.1	10.4	9.9	10.5	10.7	13.6	147.7
Average snowy days (≥ 0.1 in)	6.9	4.9	2.4	0.5	0.0	0.0	0.0	0.0	0.0	0.0	1.2	4.4	20.3
Source: NOAA (snow 1981–2010)

== Demographics ==
Historical population
Census	Pop.	Note	%±
1850	683		—
1860	704		3.1%
1870	621		−11.8%
1880	900		44.9%
1890	1,023		13.7%
1900	5,655		452.8%
1910	9,711		71.7%
1920	17,851		83.8%
1930	23,159		29.7%
1940	23,105		−0.2%
1950	29,346		27.0%
1960	27,477		−6.4%
1970	26,093		−5.0%
1980	23,863		−8.5%
1990	20,210		−15.3%
2000	19,097		−5.5%
2010	18,704		−2.1%
2020	18,416		−1.5%
2021 (est.)	18,209		−1.1%
U.S. Decennial Census

=== 2020 census ===
As of the 2020 census, Fairmont had a population of 18,416. The median age was 37.1 years. 19.2% of residents were under the age of 18 and 18.3% of residents were 65 years of age or older. For every 100 females there were 92.9 males, and for every 100 females age 18 and over there were 90.1 males age 18 and over.

99.9% of residents lived in urban areas, while 0.1% lived in rural areas.

There were 7,741 households in Fairmont, of which 24.7% had children under the age of 18 living in them. Of all households, 36.7% were married-couple households, 21.3% were households with a male householder and no spouse or partner present, and 32.1% were households with a female householder and no spouse or partner present. About 35.4% of all households were made up of individuals and 14.9% had someone living alone who was 65 years of age or older.

There were 9,045 housing units, of which 14.4% were vacant. The homeowner vacancy rate was 2.3% and the rental vacancy rate was 13.6%.

Racial composition as of the 2020 census
Race	Number	Percent
White	15,500	84.2%
Black or African American	1,338	7.3%
American Indian and Alaska Native	48	0.3%
Asian	106	0.6%
Native Hawaiian and Other Pacific Islander	33	0.2%
Some other race	97	0.5%
Two or more races	1,294	7.0%
Hispanic or Latino (of any race)	398	2.2%

=== Income ===
As of 2024, median household income in the city was $63,032 and the poverty rate was 17.4%.

=== 2010 census ===
At the 2010 census, there were 18,704 people, 8,133 households and 4,424 families living in the city. The population density was 2,169.8 inhabitants per square mile (837.8/km^{2}). There were 9,200 housing units at an average density of 1,067.3 per square mile (412.1/km^{2}). The racial makeup of the city was 88.9% White, 7.5% African American, 0.2% Native American, 0.6% Asian, 0.4% from other races, and 2.3% from two or more races. Hispanic or Latino of any race were 1.4% of the population.

There were 8,133 households, of which 24.1% had children under the age of 18 living with them, 37.7% were married couples living together, 12.5% had a female householder with no husband present, 4.2% had a male householder with no wife present, and 45.6% were non-families. 36.0% of all households were made up of individuals, and 14.1% had someone living alone who was 65 years of age or older. The average household size was 2.16 and the average family size was 2.83.

The median age was 36.8 years. 18% of residents were under the age of 18; 16.2% were between the ages of 18 and 24; 25% were from 25 to 44; 24.4% were from 45 to 64; and 16.5% were 65 years of age or older. The gender makeup of the city was 48.2% male and 51.8% female.

=== 2000 census ===
At the 2000 census, there were 19,097 people, 8,447 households and 4,671 families living in the city. The population density was 2,438.5 per square mile (941.7/km^{2}). There were 9,755 housing units at an average density of 1,245.6 per square mile (481.0/km^{2}). The racial makeup of the city was 90.16% White, 7.26% African American, 0.26% Native American, 0.61% Asian, 0.02% Pacific Islander, 0.20% from other races, and 1.49% from two or more races. Hispanic or Latino of any race were 0.82% of the population.

There were 8,447 households, of which 21.4% had children under the age of 18 living with them, 40.2% were married couples living together, 11.7% had a female householder with no husband present, and 44.7% were non-families. 36.4% of all households were made up of individuals, and 16.8% had someone living alone who was 65 years of age or older. The average household size was 2.16 and the average family size was 2.83.

18.4% of the population were under the age of 18, 14.9% from 18 to 24, 24.1% from 25 to 44, 22.2% from 45 to 64, and 20.4% who were 65 years of age or older. The median age was 39 years. For every 100 females, there were 87.0 males. For every 100 females age 18 and over, there were 83.3 males.

The median household income was $25,628 and the median family income was $37,126. Males had a median income of $27,944 and females $20,401. The per capita income was $16,062. About 12.6% of families and 20.1% of the population were below the poverty line, including 22.0% of those under age 18 and 9.7% of those age 65 or over.

== Arts and culture ==
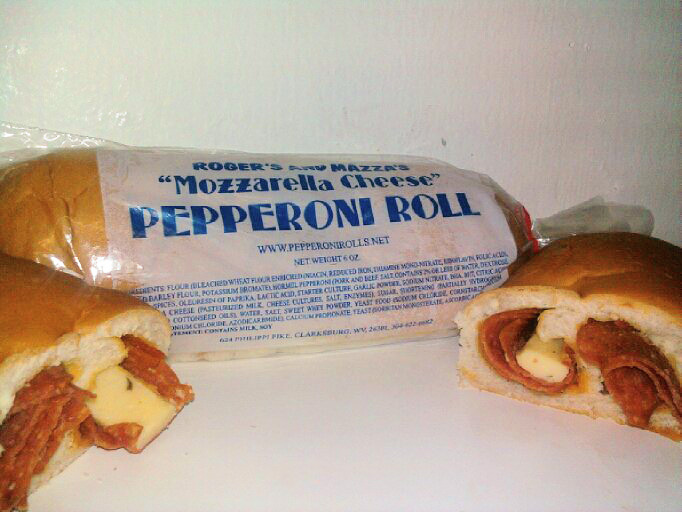
The pepperoni roll snack originated in Fairmont's Country Club Bakery

Fairmont is home to Country Club Bakery, which is where the pepperoni roll snack originates. The bakery continues to serve the roll along with their various other baked goods. Fairmont has considered itself to be the "pepperoni roll capital of the world".

The city is home to multiple offices for national agencies. Fairmont's National White Collar Crime Center provides nationwide support to law enforcement agencies involved in prevention, investigation, and prosecution of economic and high-tech crime. The NASA Katherine Johnson Independent Verification and Validation Facility, governed by the Goddard Space Flight Center, houses more than 150 full-time employees and more than 20 in-house partners and contractors. The NOAA Robert H. Mollohan Research Facility, which receives weather data from the Geostationary Operational Environmental Satellites, houses more than 100 full-time employees.

The International Thespian Society, originally called National Thespians, was founded in 1929 in Fairmont, West Virginia by Dr. Paul Opp, Earnest Bavely, and Harry T. Leeper. It honored high school theater students who participated in their school programs. The first troupe was started by Dr. Earl Blank at Natrona County High School in Casper, Wyoming.

In 2024, Fairmont hosted the inaugural Veggie Man Day, a one-day event in July to celebrate the Vegetable Man and West Virginia folklore.

== Government ==
Fairmont has a Council-manager government, whereby the mayor serves as chairman of the city council and the city manager takes care of the day-to-day operations. The current mayor is Anne Bolyard and the current city manager is Travis L. Blosser.

=== Past mayors ===
- William Elza Arnett, 1906–1908
- Matthew M. Neely, 1908–1910
- William Conaway
- A.C. West
- Fred T. Wilson, 1935–1940
- Fred T. Wilson, 1944–1945
- Albert F. Robertson, 1947–1950
- James H. Hanway, 1951–1955
- William G. Meyer, 1959
- Forrest L. Springer
- Albert F. Robinson
- J. Richard Davis
- William M. Hawkins
- James L. Turner, 1979
- Robert K. Powell, 1980
- James L. Turner, 1981
- Robert K. Powell, 1982
- Gregory T. Hinton, 1982–1984
- Robert M. Drummond Sr., 1984–1985
- Carl J. Snyder, 1985–1986
- Robert M. Drummond Jr., 1986–1990
- Wayne A. Stutler, 1990–1994
- Charles G. Manly II, 1994–1996
- Nick L. Fantasia, 1996–2006
- S. Scott Sears, 2007–2009
- Matt Delligatti, 2009–2010
- Bill Burdick, 2011–2012
- Ronald J. Straight Sr. 2013–2016
- Thomas Mainella, 2017–2019, 2021–2023
- Brad Merrifield, 2019–2020
- Anne Bolyard, 2023–present

== Education ==
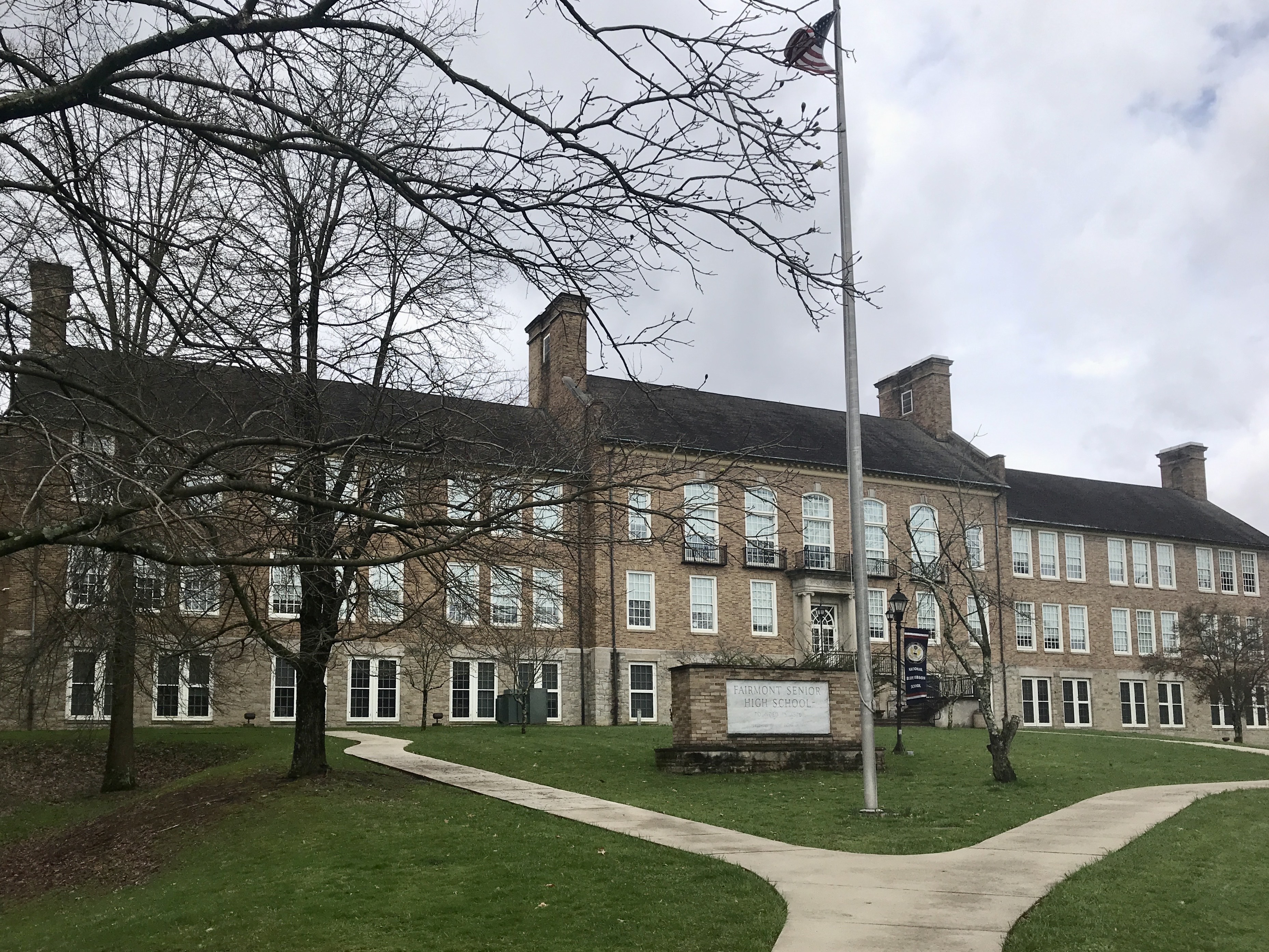
The campus of Fairmont Senior High School

Fairmont Senior High School is a public high school that is listed on the National Register of Historic Places. The school was established in the late 1800s and was relocated in 1905 and 1928. The current iteration of the school, which is located on Loop Park Drive, was designed by the architect William B. Ittner.

Fairmont State University is a public university with an approximate enrollment of 3,800 students. The institution offers master's degrees in business, education, teaching, criminal justice, and nursing, in addition to 90 baccalaureate and 50 associate degrees. Originally established as a school for teachers, the college was named Fairmont Normal School, and was located on the corner of Fairmont Avenue and Second Street and moved to its present location in 1917.

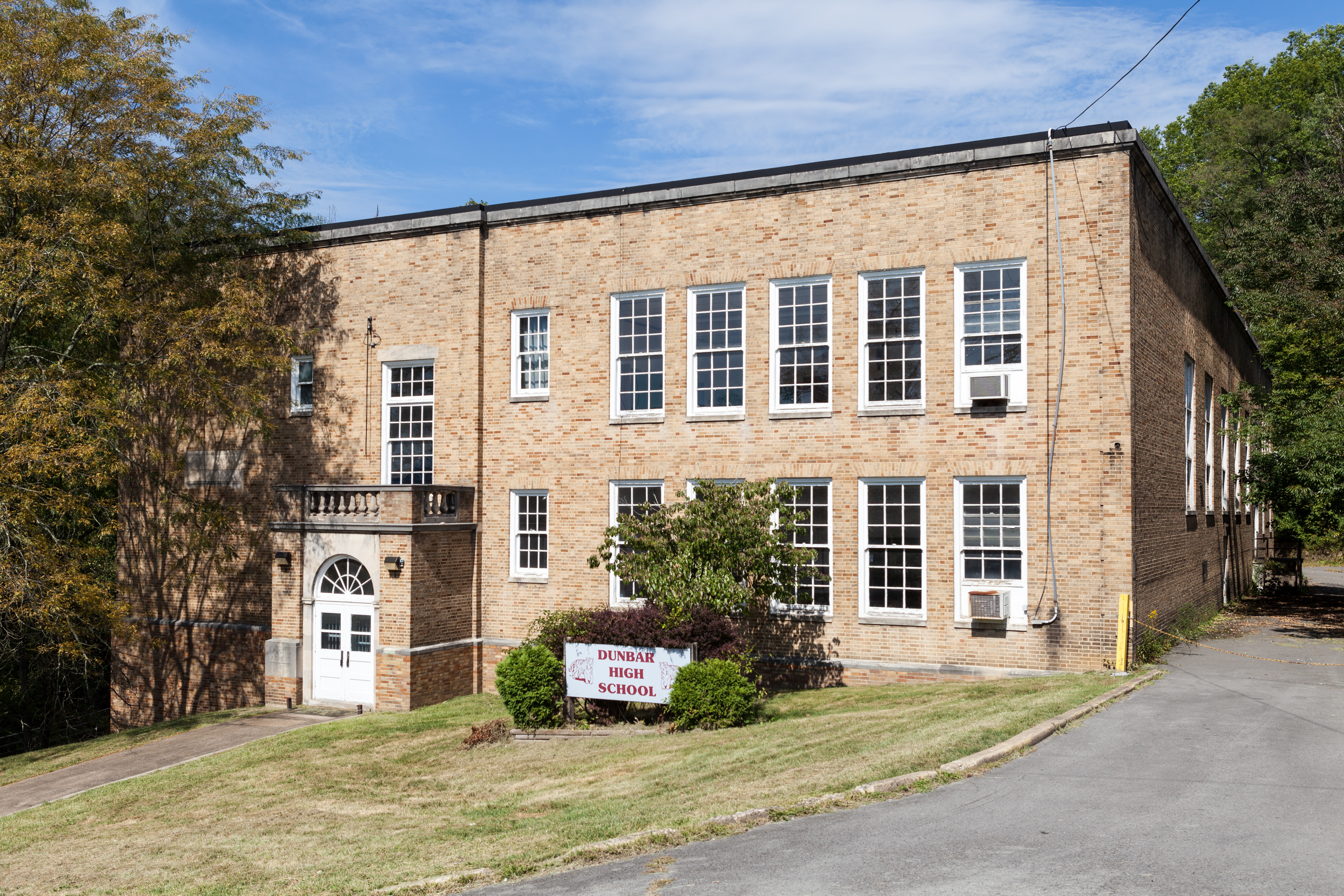
Dunbar School in 2015

Dunbar School is a historic building in Fairmont, West Virginia, that used to be an all-black high school. The school was designed by the architect William B. Ittner. The school was built in 1928.

== Media ==
=== Filming location ===
- Scenes in the films The Bad Guarduan, Gaslit By My Husband: The Morgan Metzer Story, and Feast of the Seven Fishes were filmed in Fairmont.

== Infrastructure ==
=== Highways ===
Fairmont is located in the North-Central region of the state, along West Virginia's I-79 High Tech Corridor. Major highways include:

- Interstate 79
- U.S. Highway 19
- U.S. Highway 250
- West Virginia Route 310
- West Virginia Route 273

=== Airports ===
Fairmont Municipal Airport (Frankman Field) is a public use airport located two nautical miles (4 km) southwest of the central business district of Fairmont. It is owned by the Fairmont-Marion County Regional Airport Authority.

== See also ==
- Fairmont Marion County Transit Authority
