= Msta (disambiguation) =

The Msta is a river in north-western Russia

MSTA or Msta may also refer to:

== Russian military ==
- 152 mm howitzer 2A65 Msta-B, Soviet and Russian towed howitzer
- 2S19 Msta-S, Soviet and Russian self-propelled howitzer
- 2S21 Msta-K, Soviet truck-based howitzer
- 2S33 Msta-SM, a modification of the Russian 2S35 Koalitsiya-SV self-propelled gun

== Other ==
- Msta, Tver Oblast, settlement in Russia
- Marsha Stern Talmudical Academy, in New York City, United States
- Missouri State Teachers Association
- Moorish Science Temple of America
