= Missouri State Teachers Association Building =

- Missouri State Teachers Association
- U.S. National Register of Historic Places
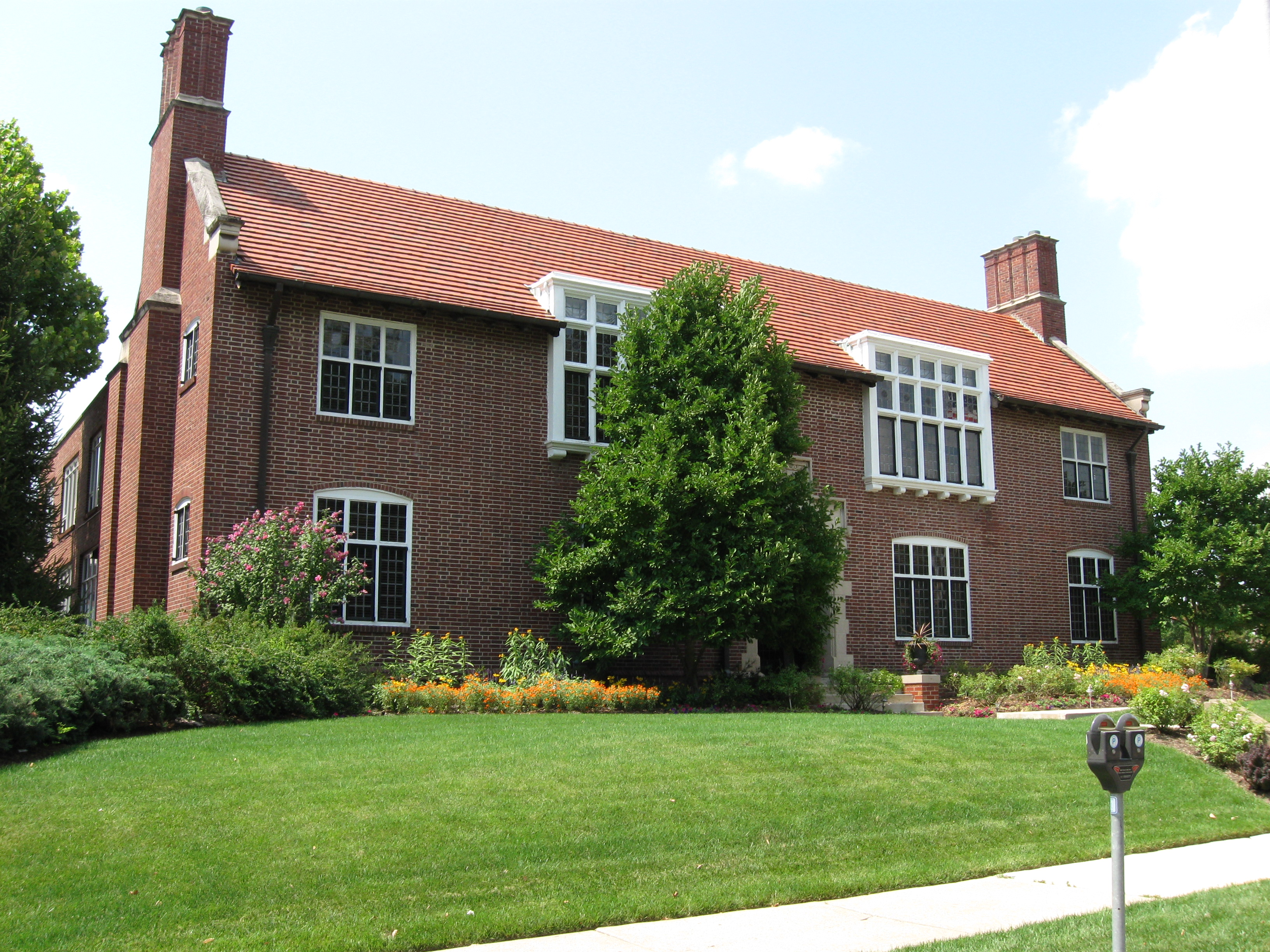

- Location within Missouri Location within the United States
- Location: 407 S. 6th St., Columbia, Missouri
- Coordinates: 38°56′50″N 92°19′53″W
- Area: less than one acre
- Built: 1927
- Architect: William B. Ittner; Kuehn, E.H.
- Architectural style: Tudor Revival, Jacobethan Revival
- NRHP reference No.: 80002311
- Added to NRHP: September 04, 1980

The Missouri State Teachers Association Building is a historic building located at Columbia, Missouri. It was built in 1927 and houses the Missouri State Teachers Association Headquarters. The building is located on South 6th Street on the University of Missouri campus and is a two-story, Tudor Revival style brick building. It was the first building in the United States built specifically to house a state teachers association. A historical marker on the site commemorates the lands former tenant "Columbia College," the forerunner of the University of Missouri.

It was added to the National Register of Historic Places in 1980.
