= Country Club Bakery =

Bakery in Fairmont, West Virginia, US

Coordinates: 39°28′18″N 80°10′14″W

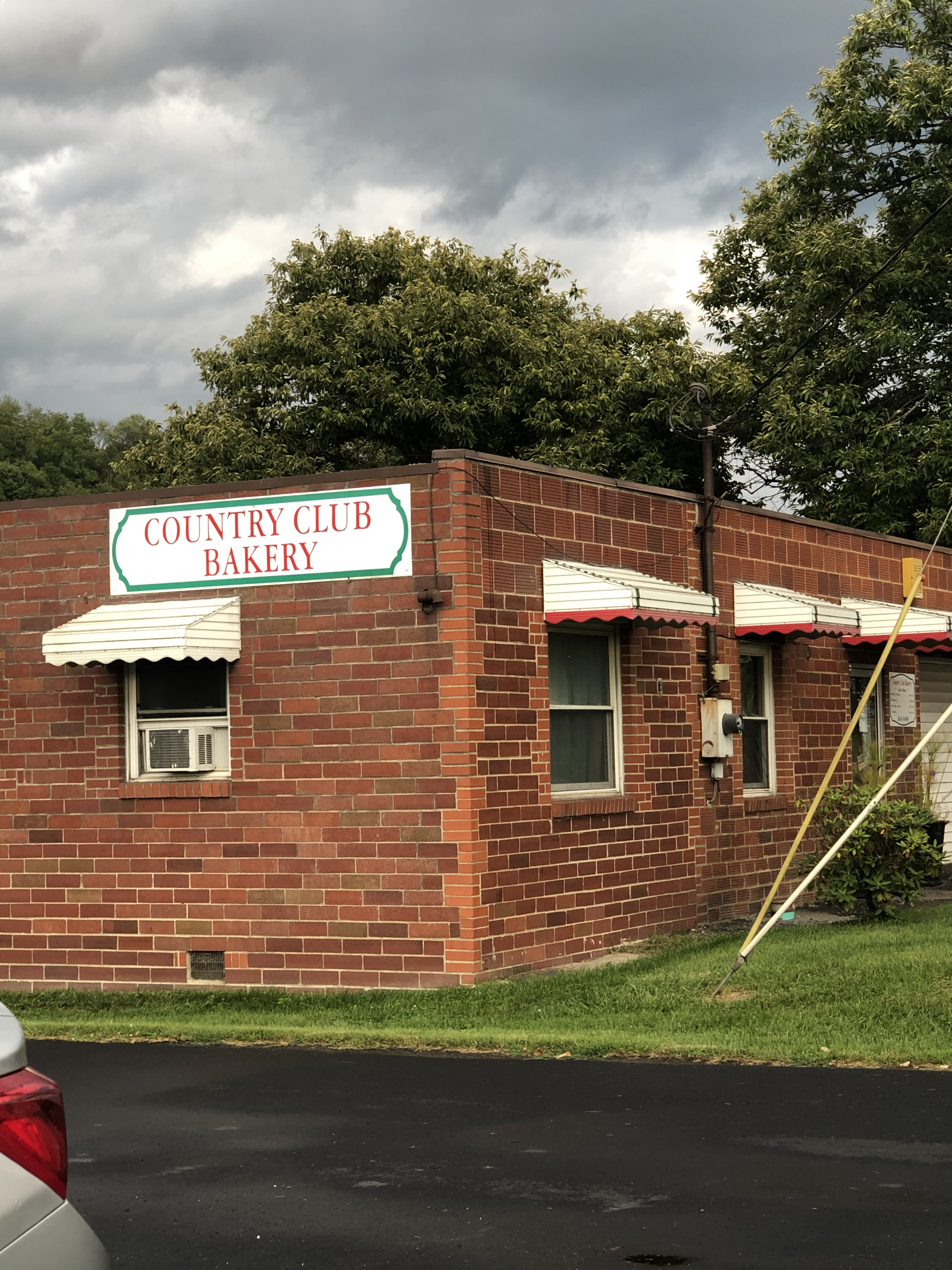
The front of Country Club Bakery

Country Club Bakery is a bakery located in Fairmont, West Virginia, which is where the pepperoni roll originated. The bakery is currently located on Country Club Road. The pepperoni roll is a snack popular in West Virginia and some nearby regions of the Appalachian Mountains.

Because of the pepperoni's roll's origins in the town, Fairmont has dubbed itself the "pepperoni roll capital of the world". In 2020, in honor of the store and snack's legacy, a marker was put up in Fairmont that states, “West Virginia delicacy created by Italian families in Fairmont to feed local coal miners. Variants now popular statewide.”

== History ==
The original location where the pepperoni roll was invented is on Robinson Street, Fairmont. The store was opened up and the snack was invented by immigrant baker Giuseppe Argiro some time around the 1910s or 1930s.

The rolls originated as a lunch option for West Virginia coal miners in the first half of the twentieth century. A large number of Italian immigrants moved to North Central West Virginia looking for work in coal mining jobs. The pepperoni roll was a convenient snack that did not spoil for the workers to eat.

The pepperoni roll bears a resemblance to the pasty and sausage roll, which originated in the mining communities of Great Britain, as well as to the Italian calzone. These foods and the pepperoni shared a similar purpose; they allowed a miner on a break from a tiring and dirty job to eat a full meal with less problem.
