= The Wilson School =

Coordinates: 38°38′30″N 90°18′24″W

The Wilson School is an independent, coeducational, preparatory school in Clayton, Missouri for students in pre-kindergarten (three years of age) through grade six. It has been in continuous operation since 1913. The Wilson School is the oldest formalized early-childhood education program in the St. Louis metropolitan area.

The Wilson School employs 21 full-time teachers, as well as three part-time teachers. The student to faculty ratio is 8:1.

== Enrollment ==
As of the 2017–2018 school year The Wilson School has an enrollment of 160 students.

Early Care and Extended Day care are available daily and during summer camp and school breaks, as needed.

== Accreditation ==
The Wilson School is accredited by the Independent Schools Association of the Central States (ISACS) and the North Central Association (NCA). The school is a member of the National Association of Independent Schools (NAIS), the Independent Schools of St. Louis (ISSL), the Educational Records Bureau (ERB), the Council for the Advancement of Private Education (CAPE), and a number of other organizations.

== Location ==
The school is located on a quiet, tree-lined street in Clayton, Missouri one block west of Forest Park in the DeMun neighborhood.

The school is housed in a historic building located at 400 De Mun Ave just outside St. Louis. The building was designed and built by the noted architect William B. Ittner in 1916. The Wilson School moved to its current location in 1960.

On March 29, 2012 the historic building at 400 DeMun Ave was seriously damaged by fire. A fire started in the attic in the early morning hours and spread throughout the building. The fire was ruled an accident.

From April–December 2012, the school leased the Maryland School from the Clayton School District. This location served as the temporary home of the school until the end of the 2011–2012 school year.

In January 2013, school resumed at 400 DeMun Avenue. The newly renovated facilities preserved the integrity of the historic character of the building, including restoration of original windows and floors.

Also in 2013, The Wilson School celebrated its 100th anniversary with many festivities and the publication of "The Wilson School - Celebrating Excellence Since 1913" by former Head of School, Eugene D. Ruth.
