= St. Louis Colored Orphans Home =

- U.S. National Register of Historic Places
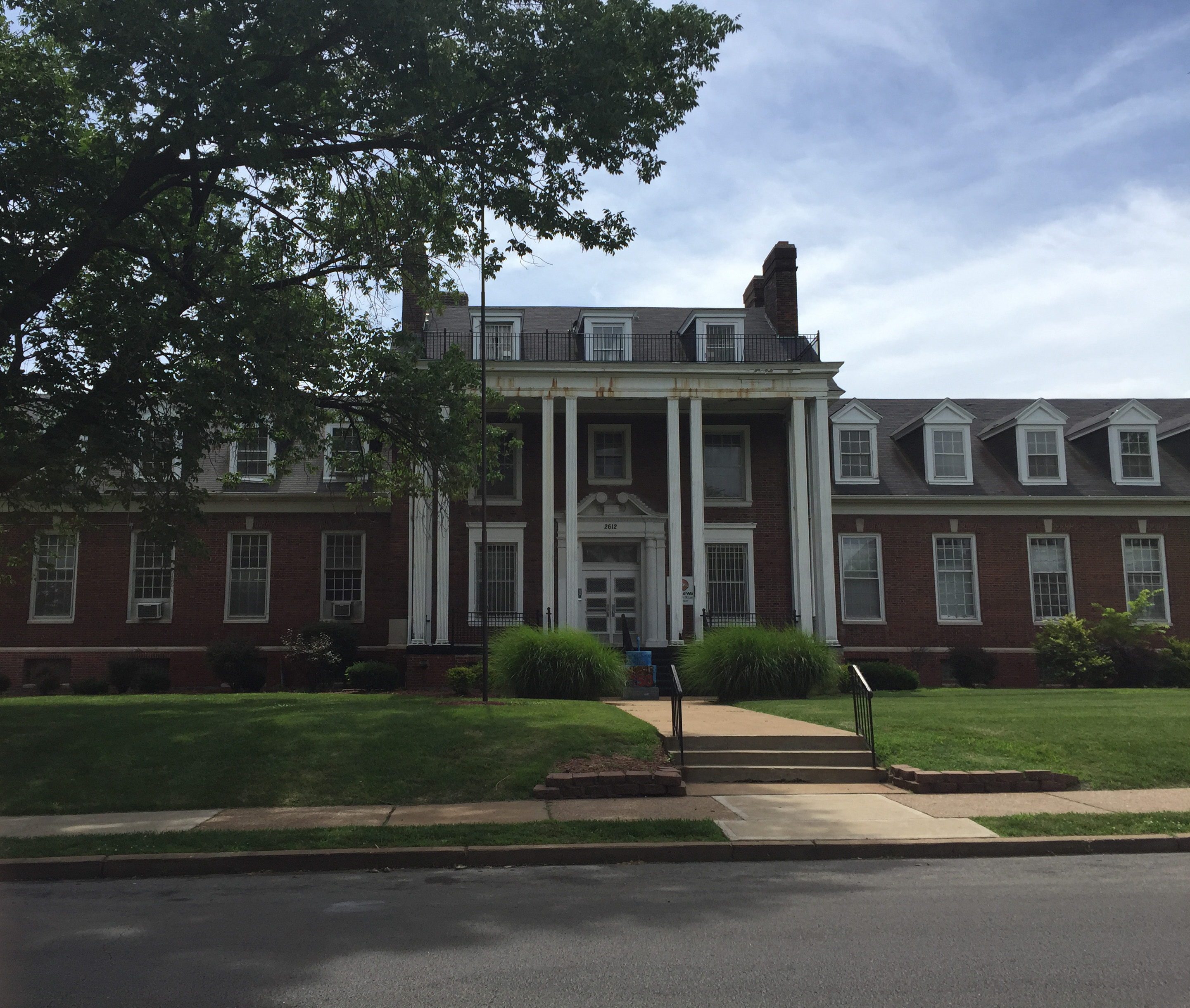

- Location within Missouri
- Location: 2612 Annie Malone Drive; St. Louis, Missouri, U.S.
- Coordinates: 38.659613°N 90.23663°W
- Area: less than one acre
- Built: 1922
- Architect: William Butts Ittner
- Architectural style: Colonial Revival
- MPS: The Ville, St. Louis, Missouri MPS
- NRHP reference No.: 99001164
- Added to NRHP: September 17, 1999

St. Louis Colored Orphans Home is a historic orphanage for Black orphans and building in The Ville neighborhood of St. Louis, Missouri, U.S.. It has been known as the Annie Malone Children and Family Service Center since 1946. It serves as a shelter for children who need a temporary home and a counseling center for families in crisis. The St. Louis Colored Orphans Home has been listed on the National Register of Historic Places since 1999, for the architecture and contributions to Black history.

== History ==
On February 23, 1887, a group of women from the Women's Christian Temperance Association resolved to address the plight of black orphans in the city of St. Louis. Although the group enjoyed the sponsorship of the Christian Temperance Union, its decision to establish the city's first home for Black orphans necessitated a separate incorporation. In 1888, the St. Louis Colored Orphans Home was founded with Sarah Newton Cohran serving as president. Cohran, was the wife of a Baptist minister, had been the widow of Charles Newton, one of the first Black school administrators in the city of St. Louis. Cohran had used her influence with the president of Boatmen's Bank to transfer the ownership of the Negro Civil War Veterans Home to the new St. Louis Colored Orphan's Home.

Located at 1247 N. Twelfth Street and now demolished, the home remained in that location until 1901, when a house at 4316 Natural Bridge Avenue was purchased with the help of private investors. The Home's Natural Bridge Avenue location in a semi-rural part of the city and came with additional acreage and two cows. By 1919, however, the area became more urban and the house, which had been condemned by the city started experiencing financial issues. Goode Street was re-named Annie Malone Drive in 1990.

The Colonial Revival red brick building at 2612 Annie Malone Drive consists of three-stories at its tallest point, features paired chimneys at either end of gables and two wings at the two-story height. It is located on the same lot as the National Register-listed Homer G. Phillips Hospital (now the Homer G. Phillips Senior Apartments). The building was designed by nationally-known St. Louis architect William Butts Ittner some years after his tenure as the first Commissioner of St. Louis School Buildings.

On May 1, 1922, the St. Louis Colored Orphans Home at the new location was dedicated, providing care for 35 children between the ages of five and fourteen. By 1926, a daily average of 65 children were receiving services from the home. By 1938, the number of children served has risen to 232, it declined to 190 children in 1941. In 1999, it averaged around serving 50 children.

Annie Malone was a local businesswoman, inventor and philanthropist, who served as a donor; and also served as the president of the board for the St. Louis Colored Orphans Home from 1919 until 1943. Malone herself had been an orphan. The St. Louis Colored Orphans Home was renamed the Annie Malone Children’s Home in 1946 because of her service and support.

== See also ==
- National Register of Historic Places listings in St. Louis north and west of downtown
