= Bailey School (Springfield, Missouri) =

- U.S. National Register of Historic Places
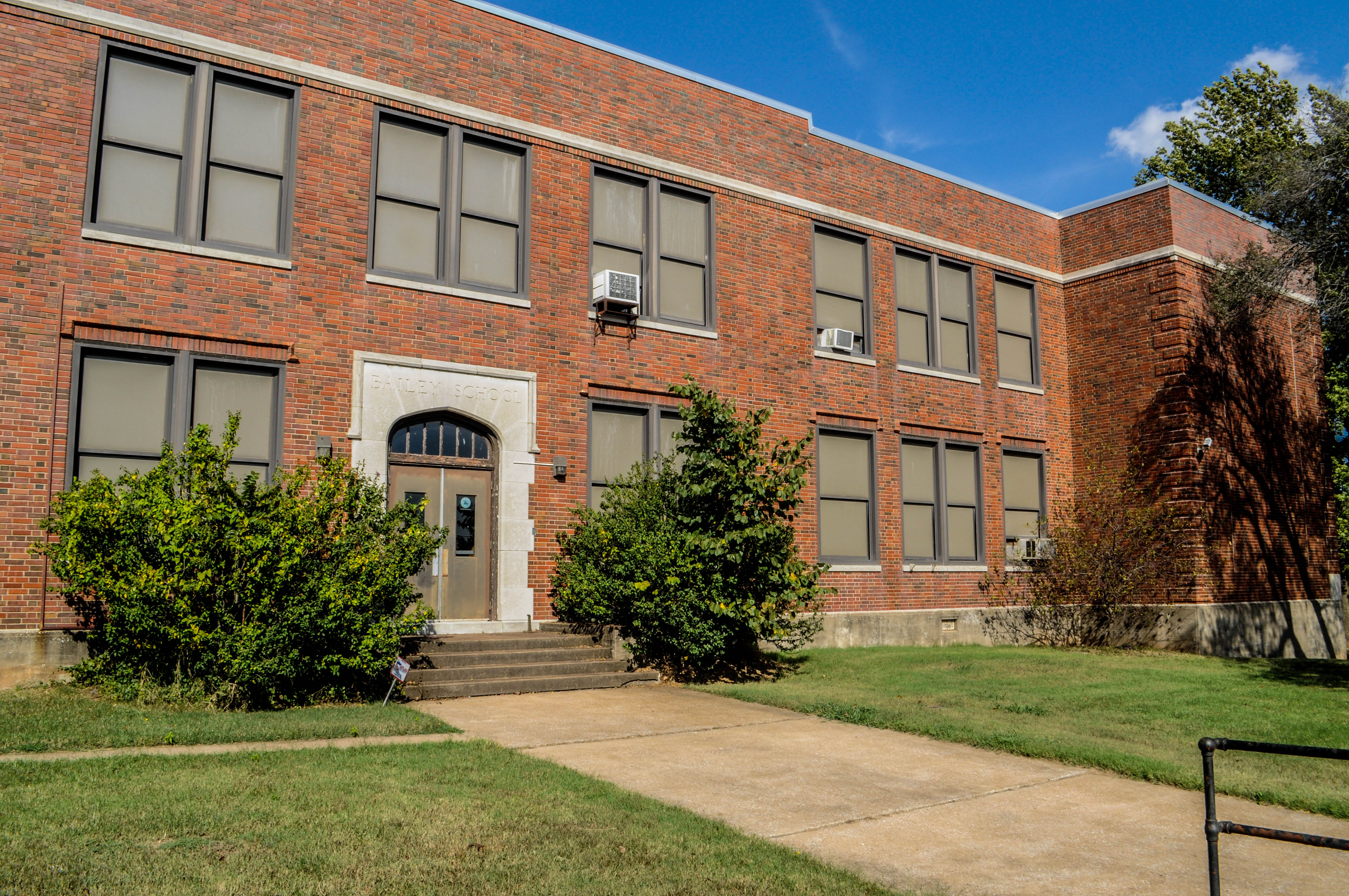

- Location within Missouri Location within the United States
- Location: 501 W. Central St., Springfield, Missouri
- Coordinates: 37°13′03″N 93°17′42″W
- Area: 1.9 acres (0.77 ha)
- Built: 1931
- Architect: Ittner, William B.; Heckenlively and Mark
- Architectural style: Jacobethan Revival
- NRHP reference No.: 16000749
- Added to NRHP: November 2, 2016

Bailey School, also known as New Bailey School, is a historic school building located at Springfield, Greene County, Missouri. It was designed by architect William B. Ittner and built in 1931. It is a two-story, red brick building on a concrete foundation with simple Jacobethan Revival style design elements. A long, low one-story warehouse addition on the back wall was added in 1966.

It was listed on the National Register of Historic Places in 2016.

The school has since been sold by Springfield Public Schools and renovated into 25 loft apartments. The project was completed in 2019, and aimed to preserve the schools original flooring, hallways, and outdoor spaces, including a greenhouse.
