= Dunbar School (Fairmont, West Virginia) =

- U.S. National Register of Historic Places
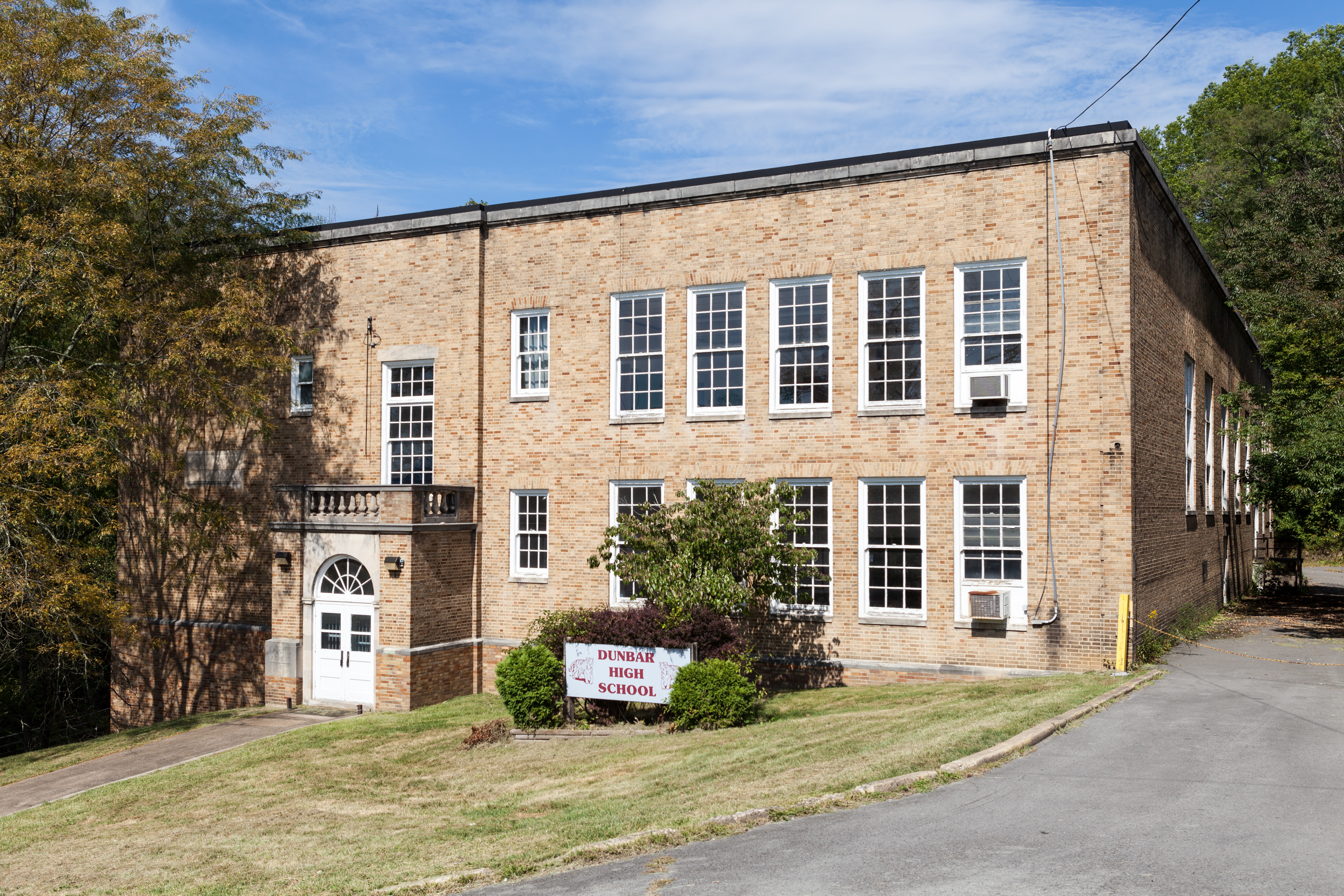
- The school in September 2015

- Location within West Virginia Location within the United States
- Location: 103 High St, Fairmont, West Virginia
- Coordinates: 39°29′12″N 80°8′48″W
- Built: 1928
- Built by: D.J. Phippps Company
- Architect: William B. Ittner
- Architectural style: Colonial Revival
- NRHP reference No.: 15000188
- Added to NRHP: April 28, 2015

Dunbar School is a historic school building located in Fairmont, Marion County, West Virginia. It was built in 1928, and the first classes were held in January 1929. The school was added to the National Register of Historic Places in 2015.

== History ==
Dunbar was attended by black students in grades one through twelve. It was the only school for black children in Fairmont, and the only black high school for Marion County. According to Christopher Belkon Agba, “Dunbar School was the center of the Westside community [a now-African American community in Fairmont] for socialization, communication, relationship building, and an education center of the neighborhood. Per residents, it didn’t matter if you had a child attending, it was a place for everyone.” The school was a member of the North Central Association for Secondary Schools and Colleges.

Dunbar's last use as a high school came with the federally mandated end of segregated public education in the 1954–55 school year. Low enrollment ended the primary grades as well in 1956 and the school was closed. Dunbar reopened as an annex to the Fairmont Junior High School in 1963 and was used as an elementary school starting in the 1970s. It was permanently closed in 2007.

The school was named after Paul Laurence Dunbar, one of the first black writers to build a national reputation. It lost the Dunbar name in 1963, but it was restored when Fairmont residents petitioned the Board of Education in 1970.

== Architecture ==
The school is built on a slope with two stories and an exposed basement section on the west elevation. The east elevation has five large windows to light the gymnasium. The rectangular building uses buff-colored brick with Flemish Garden Wall bond.

The building was designed by William B. Ittner, a well-known designer of public school buildings. Other Fairmont schools built by Ittner include the Thomas C. Miller Public School and the Fairmont Senior High School.
