= Pepperoni roll =

Italian-American dish

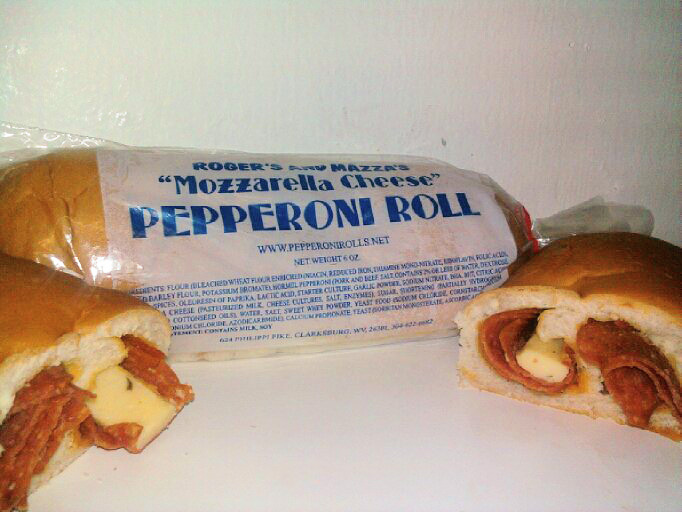
- Type: Bread
- Place of origin: United States
- Region or state: West Virginia
- Main ingredients: White bread, pepperoni
- Variations: Cheese (usually mozzarella or provolone), marinara

The pepperoni roll is an Italian-American stuffed bread roll. Originally conceived of as a coal miner's lunch, it is popular in West Virginia and some nearby regions of the Appalachian Mountains most notably Western Pennsylvania, Western Maryland, Eastern Kentucky, and Appalachian Ohio. In West Virginia it is nearly ubiquitous, particularly in convenience stores, and is arguably the food most closely associated with the state. Pepperoni rolls are also found in Southeast Michigan where they were popular among auto workers in the factories.

The classic pepperoni roll consists of a fairly soft white yeast-leavened bread roll with pepperoni baked in the middle. During baking, the fats in the pepperoni (which are hard at room temperature) melt, resulting in a spicy oil suffusing into the bread. Pepperoni rolls are typically eaten for lunch or breakfast, either unheated or slightly warmed.

A resolution was introduced in the West Virginia House of Delegates in 2013 declaring the pepperoni roll as the official state food, but the resolution was tabled. A new resolution was introduced and adopted by the House of Delegates in 2021 only to languish in the state senate. However, its state tourism bureau still calls the dish the state food of West Virginia.

== Origins ==
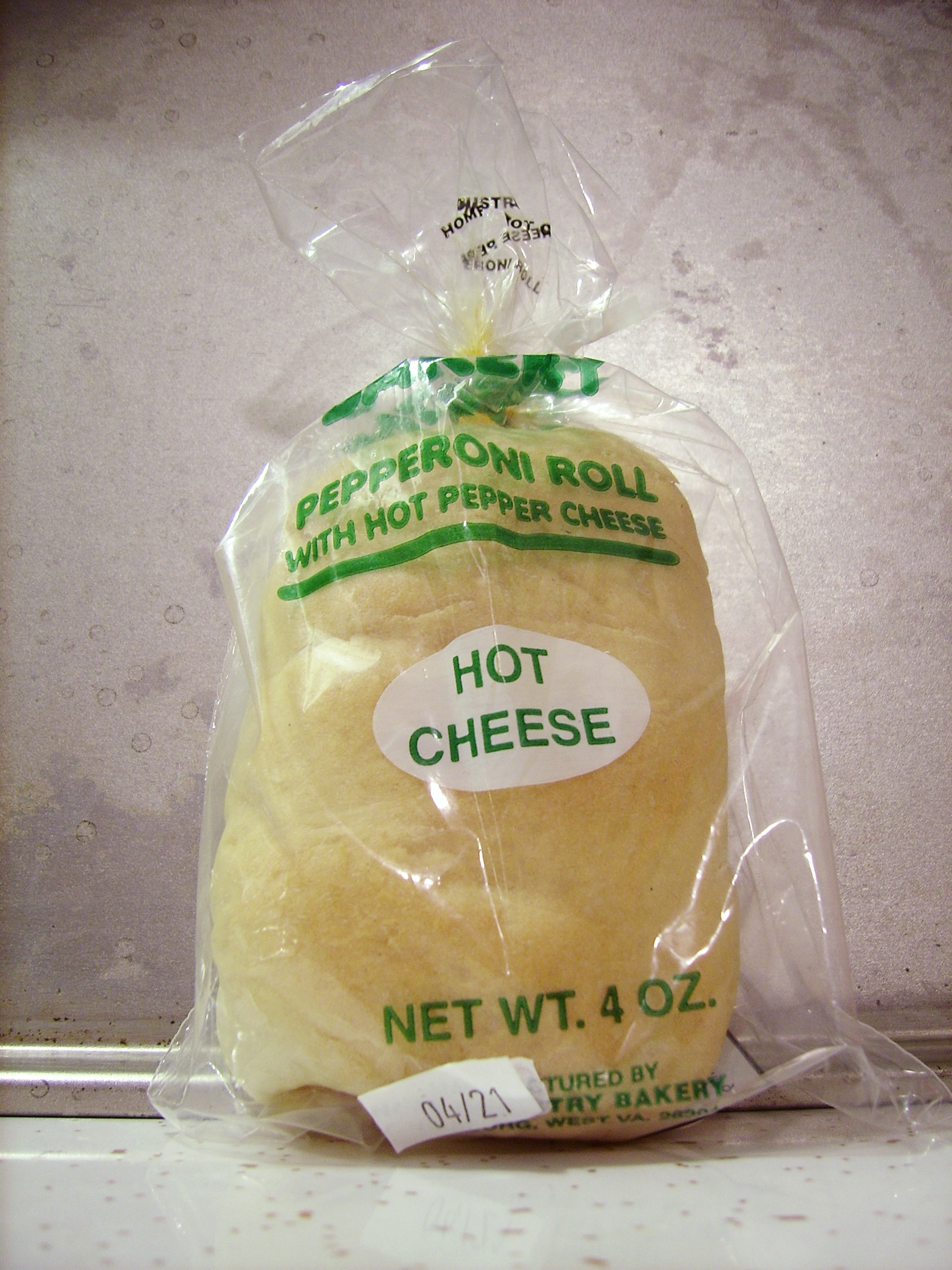
A packaged pepperoni roll

The pepperoni roll was first sold by Giuseppe "Joseph" Argiro at the Country Club Bakery in Fairmont, West Virginia, in 1927. The rolls originated as a lunch option for the coal miners of north-central West Virginia in the first half of the 20th century. Pepperoni rolls do not need to be refrigerated for storage and could readily be packed for lunch by miners. Pepperoni and other Italian foods became popular in north-central West Virginia in the early 20th century, when the booming mines and railroads attracted many immigrants from Italy. The pepperoni roll bears a resemblance to the pasty and the sausage roll, which originated in the mining communities of Great Britain, as well as the Italian calzone.

== Variations ==
Variations on the original pepperoni roll may contain different types of cheese, peppers, or other ingredients. The pepperoni within can take several forms, including a single stick, several folded slices, or shredded or ground meat.

== Legal challenges ==
In 1987, a bakery shipped pepperoni rolls from West Virginia to Maryland. While the pepperoni had been inspected as an ingredient before it was baked into the rolls, the Food Safety and Inspection Service of the USDA decided that the final product needed to be inspected as well because it was sold outside the bakery, similar to how a bakery making pepperoni pizzas would require inspection of the final product if the final product was sold outside the bakery via a supermarket or convenience store. The United States Department of Agriculture (USDA) proposed reclassifying bakeries that manufactured the rolls as meat processing plants, thus subjecting them to daily inspections for hygiene. The bakery owners said that meeting the new regulations would increase costs so much that producing pepperoni rolls would no longer be profitable to them. The USDA suggested that the bakeries cut them in half and rename them pepperoni sandwiches, because cut sandwiches are not subject to the additional hygiene regulations, but the bakeries refused, saying customers would not buy pepperoni rolls cut in half. Jay Rockefeller, U.S. Senator for West Virginia, intervened and met with Secretary of Agriculture Richard Lyng. After the meeting, Secretary Lyng issued a special exemption to bakeries producing pepperoni rolls.

== As military rations ==
In the early 2000s, the U.S. military began including a version of the pepperoni roll in one of the MREs (Meals, Ready-to-Eat) provided to troops. In the late 2000s, the U.S. Army changed the pepperoni roll to its First Strike Ration. These rations are designed for light infantry, airborne, and special forces during a typical 72-hour patrol. The pepperoni roll's compact size and comparatively high nutritional return make it an ideal ration for these patrols. These rations were extensively employed during Operation Enduring Freedom. The military's rolls are made by a North Carolina company.

== See also ==
- List of stuffed dishes
- Beef bun
- Calzone
- Cha siu bao
- Hot Pockets
- Klobásník
- Sausage roll
- Stromboli
