= William B. Ittner =

American architect (1864–1936)

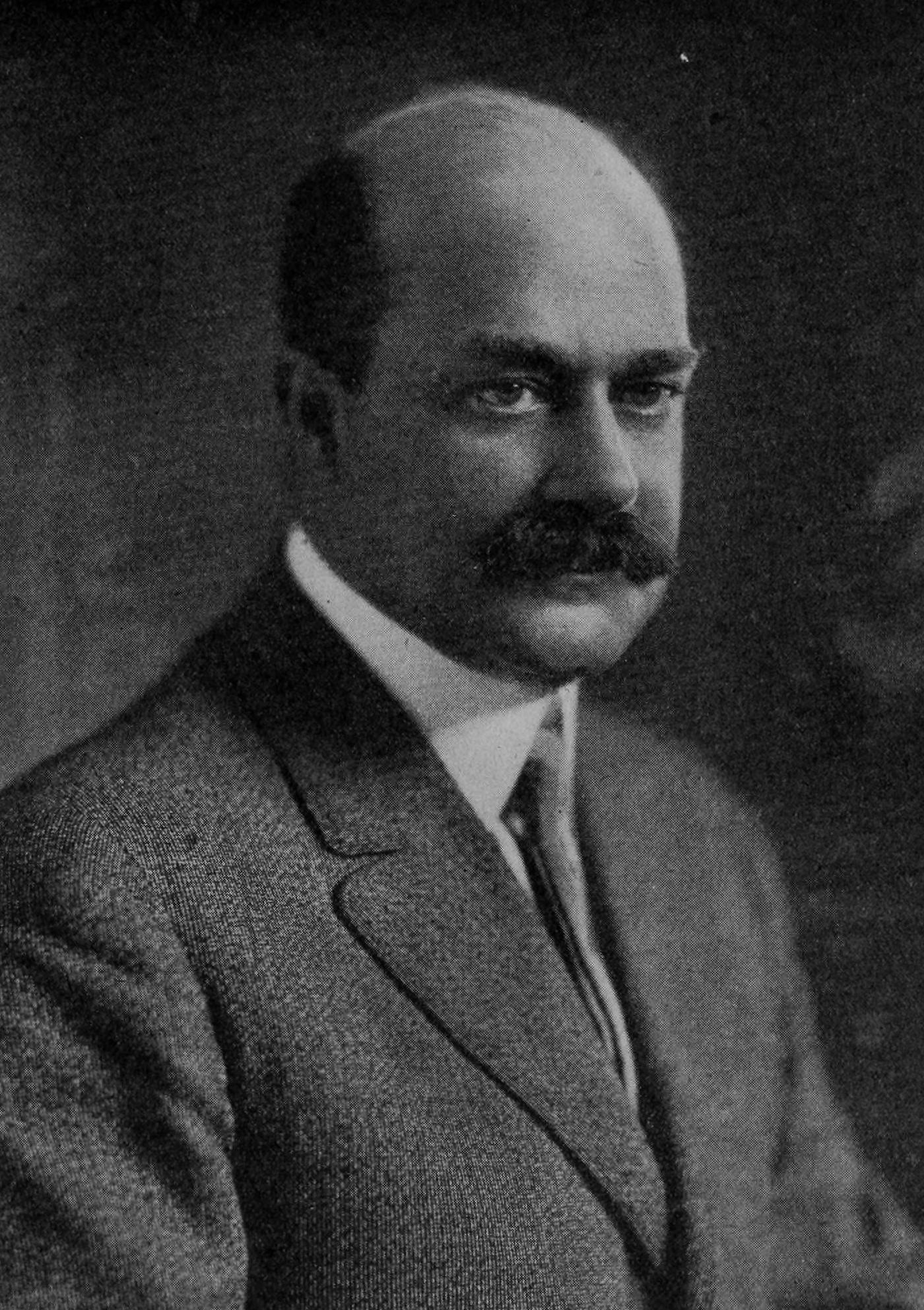
- Ittner, c. 1921
- Born: September 4, 1864; St. Louis, Missouri, U.S.
- Died: 1936; St. Louis, Missouri, U.S.
- Occupation: Architect

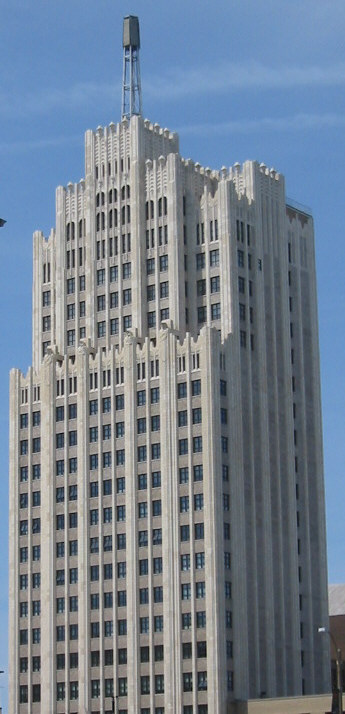
Art Deco style of the Continental Life Building in St. Louis

William Butts Ittner (September 4, 1864 – 1936) was an American architect in St. Louis, Missouri. He designed over 430 school buildings in Missouri and other areas, was president of the St. Louis Chapter of the American Institute of Architects from 1893 to 1895, was awarded an honorary degree by the University of Missouri in 1930, served as president of the Architectural League of America during 1903–04, and at the time of his death was president of the St. Louis Plaza Commission, a fellow and life member of the American Institute of Architects, and a thirty-third degree Mason. He was described as the most influential man in school architecture in the United States and has a star on the St. Louis Walk of Fame. He was appointed St. Louis School Board commissioner in 1897 and is said to have designed open buildings that featured "natural lighting, inviting exteriors, and classrooms tailored to specific needs." In 1936, Ittner died.

== Background ==
His parents were Anthony F. and Mary Butts Ittner. His father worked at a lead plant and then as a bricklayer before founding Ittner Bros. with his brother Conrad in 1859. William Ittner's father (later a U.S. Congressman) helped establish the trade school from which his son graduated in 1884 "with the first class granted diplomas by Washington University's Manual Training School." He also graduated with a degree in architecture from Cornell University College of Architecture, Art, and Planning, traveled in Europe and married Lottie Crane Allen in St. Louis. He worked in the office of Eames & Young between 1889 and 1891, then practiced alone "before entering brief partnerships, first with William Foster and then with T. C. Link and Alfred Rosenheim."

He was elected to the new office of Commissioner of School Buildings for the School Board of St. Louis in 1897 and remained in the position until he resigned in 1910. He continued as "consulting architect" to the Board until October 1914. His first school design was Eliot School (1898–99) and his last was Bryan Mullanphy (1914–15).

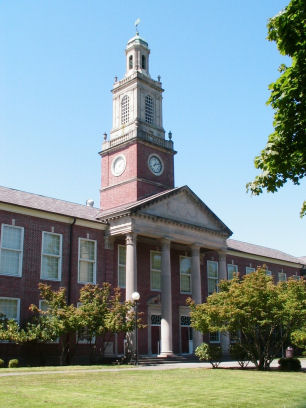
R.A. Long High School

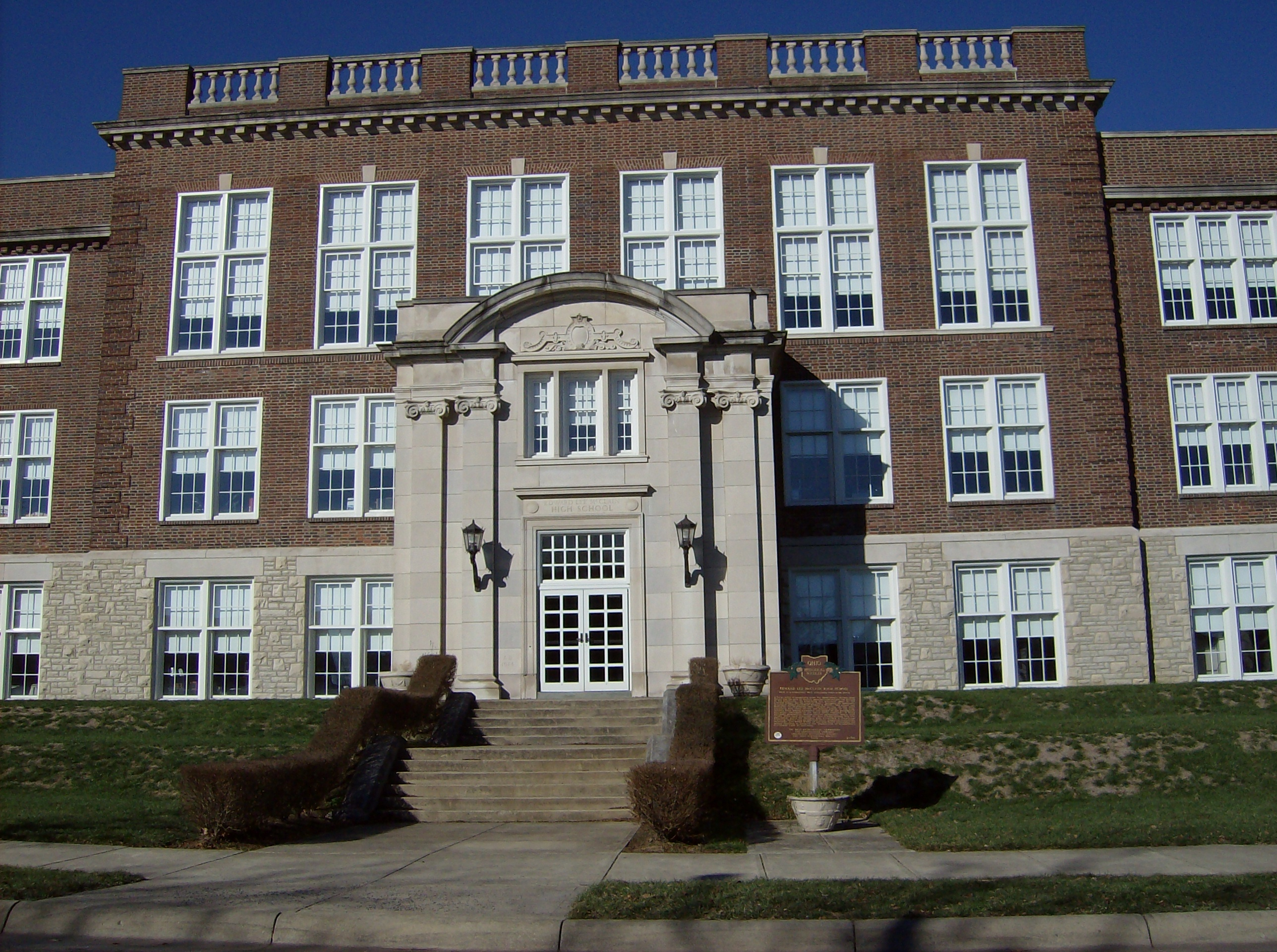
Front entrance to McClain High School

He is credited with the design of over 430 schools nationwide and has over 35 buildings on the National Register of Historic Places. E-shaped schools were said to be his trademark.

== Architectural innovations ==
Many of the architectural planning and designs seen in schools today were developed by Ittner. Some examples include:

1. Integrated ventilation: Ittner designed chases to be placed behind lockers, which allowed air from inside the school to exit through chimneys.
2. Natural lighting: Ittner integrated large windows, skylights, and lightwells in order to introduce light inside school buildings.
3. Standardized plans: Ittner constructed plans that would effectively connect the specialized places of the school into one, cohesive unit. These plans included the H-Plan, I-Plan, and L-Plan.
4. The Community School Concept: Ittner used site planning concepts to allow school resources to be available to residents in the surrounding areas.

== Projects ==
=== Residences ===
- 6034 West Cabanne Place, St. Louis, Missouri (1891)
- 2137–2139 California Avenue, St. Louis, Missouri (1893)
- 3439 Longfellow, St. Louis, Missouri (1893)
- 3013 Hawthorne, St. Louis, Missouri (1894)
- 3435 Hawthorne, St. Louis, Missouri (1895)

=== Schools ===
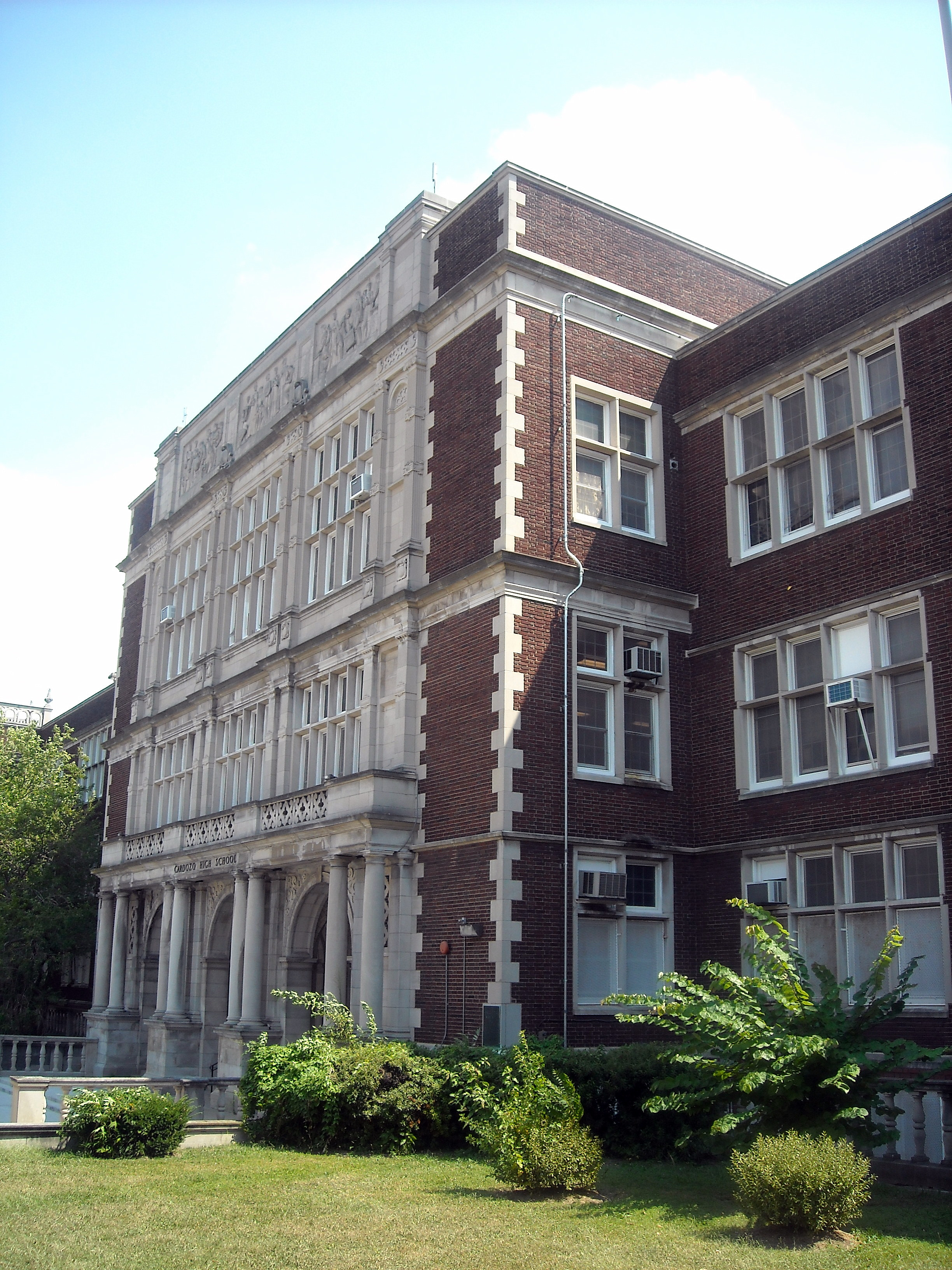
Cardozo Senior High School in the Columbia Heights neighborhood of Washington, D.C.

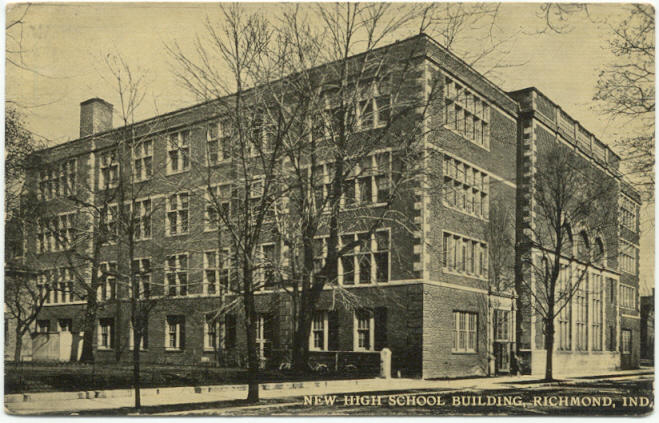
Former Morton High School building, Richmond, Indiana featuring a Pewabic Pottery frieze.

- Board of Education Building, St. Louis, Missouri (1893) (NRHP)
- Arlington School, St. Louis, Missouri (1898) (NRHP)
- Jackson School, St. Louis, Missouri (1898) (NRHP)
- Rock Spring School, St. Louis, Missouri (1898) (NRHP)
- Simmons Colored School, St. Louis, Missouri (1898) (NRHP)
- Eugene Field School, St. Louis, Missouri (1900) (NRHP)
- Wyman School, St. Louis, Missouri (1900) (NRHP)
- Grant School, St. Louis, Missouri (1901) (NRHP)
- Ralph Waldo Emerson School, St. Louis, Missouri (1901) (NRHP)
- Horace Mann School, St. Louis, Missouri (1901) (NRHP)
- Eliot School, St. Louis, Missouri (1901) (NRHP)
- Missouri School for the Blind, St. Louis, Missouri (1904-1906)
- McKinley High School, St. Louis, Missouri (1902)
- Harris Teachers College, St. Louis, Missouri (1906) (NRHP)
- Hempstead School, St. Louis, Missouri (1906) (NRHP)
- Gardenville School, St. Louis, Missouri (1907)
- Greenville High School, Greenville, Ohio
- Sumner High School, St. Louis, Missouri (1908)
- Ralph Waldo Emerson School, Gary, Indiana (1908) (NRHP)
- Carr School, St. Louis, Missouri (1908) (NRHP
- Soldan High School, St. Louis, Missouri (1909)
- Wichita High School, Wichita, Kansas (1910) (NRHP)
- Jefferson High School, Lafayette, Indiana (1910-1911)
- Central High School, South Bend, Indiana (1911) (NRHP)
- Delaney School, St. Louis, Missouri (1911) (NRHP)
- Mark Twain School/Goodall School, Webster Groves, Missouri (1911 & 1927)
- Shelbyville High School, Shelbyville, Indiana (1911) (NRHP)
- Hume-Fogg High School, Nashville, Tennessee (1912) (NRHP)
- Grover Cleveland High School, St. Louis, Missouri (1913)
- Delmar-Harvard School, University City, Missouri (1913)
- Thomas C. Miller Public School, Fairmont, West Virginia (1914) (NRHP)
- McClain High School, Greenfield, Ohio (1915)
- W. H. Adamson High School, Dallas, Texas (1915)
- The Wilson School, St Louis, Missouri (1916)
- Forest Avenue High School, Dallas, Texas (1916) (NRHP)
- Francis L. Cardozo Senior High School, Washington, D.C. (1916) (NRHP)
- Marshall School, St. Louis, Missouri (1918) (NRHP)
- Frankfort Community High School, West Frankfort, Illinois (1920)
- Former Niagara Falls High School, Niagara Falls, New York (1921) (NRHP)
- Franklin School, St. Louis, Missouri (1923) (NRHP)
- Normandy High School, Normandy, Missouri (1923)
- Belleville High School-West, Belleville, Illinois (1924)
- Central High School, Columbus, Ohio (1924)
- Bel-Nor Elementary School, Bel-Nor, Missouri (1926)
- St. Petersburg High School, St. Petersburg, Florida (1926) (NRHP)
- Robert Alexander Long High School, Longview, Washington (1927) (NRHP)
- Dunbar School, Fairmont, West Virginia (1928) (NRHP)
- Fairmont Senior High School, Fairmont, West Virginia (1928) (NRHP)
- Maplewood-Richmond Heights High School, Maplewood, Missouri (1929)
- Nipher Middle School, Kirkwood, Missouri (1929)
- Ramsey High School, Birmingham, Alabama (1930)
- Lincoln School, Springfield, Missouri (1930)
- Keysor Elementary School, Kirkwood, Missouri (1930)
- Robinson Elementary School, Kirkwood, Missouri (1930)
- University City High School, University City, Missouri (1930) (NRHP)
- Theodore Roosevelt High School, Gary, Indiana (1930) (NRHP)
- Lew Wallace School, Gary, Indiana (1930)
- Bailey School, Springfield, Missouri (1931) (NRHP)
- John M Vogt High School , Ferguson, Missouri (1931)
- Phelps School, Springfield, Missouri (1931)
- Hanley Junior High School, University City, Missouri (1936) (demolished 1985)
- Morton High School, Richmond, Indiana (1939)
- Park City Junior High School, Knoxville, Tennessee (NRHP)
- Greenfield Educational Complex, Greenfield, Ohio**
- Froebel School, Gary, Indiana (1912)(NRHP)
- Horace Mann School, Gary, Indiana (1926)
- Clark Elementary School, Webster Groves, Missouri (1948)
- Edgar Road Elementary School, Webster Groves, Missouri
- Goodall School, Webster Groves, Missouri (now condominiums)
- Douglass Elementary School, Webster Groves, Missouri (now Douglass Manor)

=== Other buildings ===
- Masonic Temple, Belleville, Illinois (1915)
- Missouri Athletic Club, St. Louis, Missouri (1916) (NRHP)
- Principia Page-Park YMCA Gymnasium, St. Louis, Missouri (1919) (NRHP) (significant expansion to 1910 structure designed by A.B. Groves)
- Scottish Rite Cathedral, St. Louis, Missouri (1921)
- Ainad Temple, East St. Louis, Illinois (1922) (in conjunction with Albert B. Frankel)
- St. Louis Colored Orphans Home, St. Louis, Missouri (1922) (NRHP)
- Masonic Temple, Webster Groves, Missouri (1923)
- Shriners Hospital for Crippled Children, St. Louis, Missouri (1922) (NRHP)
- Masonic Temple, Maplewood, Missouri (1924) (demolished c. 1984)
- Missouri State Teachers Association Building, Columbia, Missouri (1927) (NRHP)
- Continental Life Building, St. Louis, Missouri (1929)
