= Missouri State Teachers Association =

Missouri State Teacher Association (MSTA) is a state teachers association that serves more than 46,000 educators in the U.S. state of Missouri and is dedicated to educating the state's children. The headquarters is located in Columbia, Missouri in the Missouri State Teachers Association Building, which is on the National Register of Historic Places.

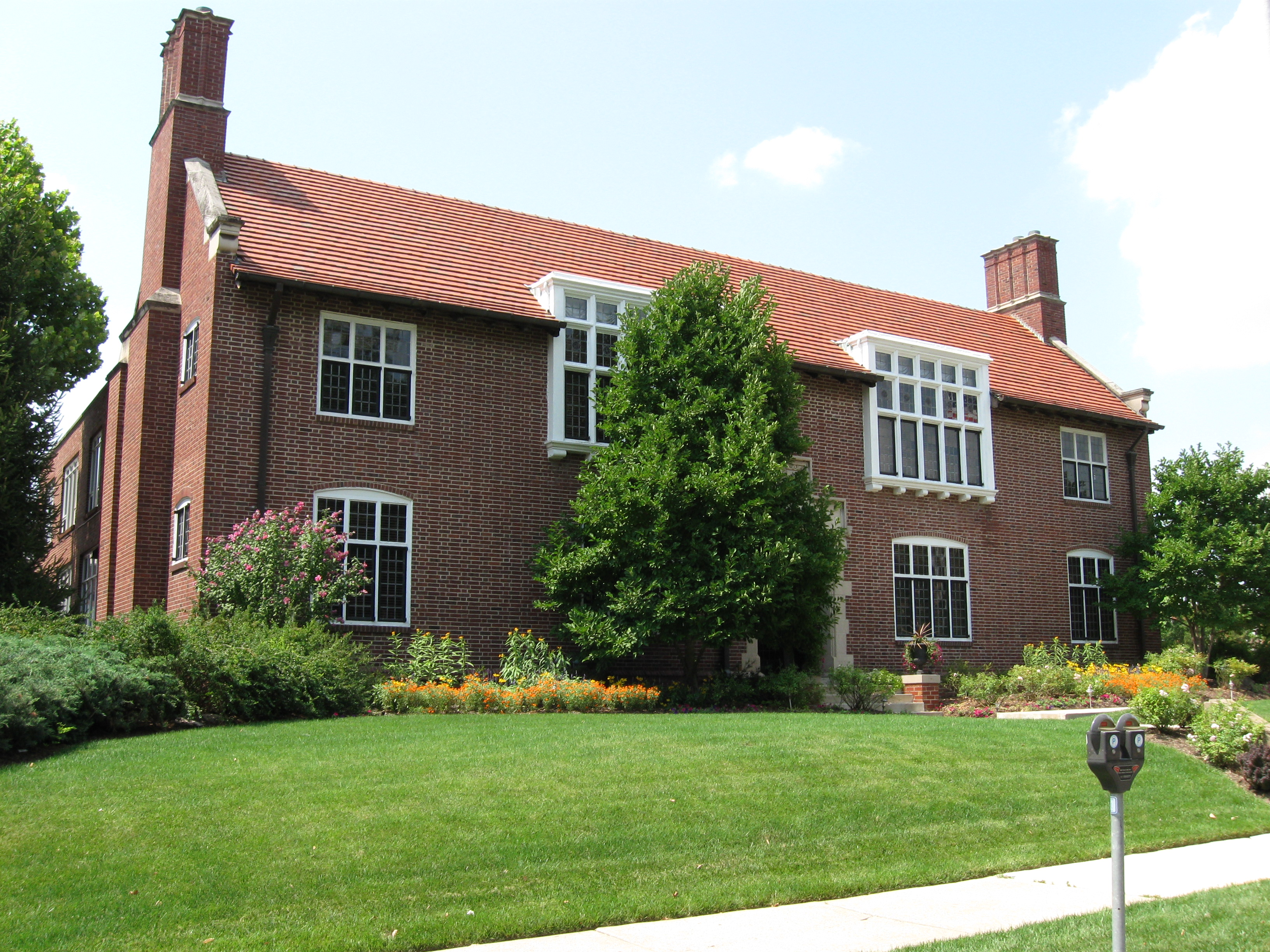
The headquarters of MSTA in Columbia, Missouri

== History ==
On May 23, 1856, 110 men and women from 22 Missouri counties met in Wyman's Hall St. Louis, Missouri in St. Louis to form an organization that would “unite the different members, advancing their mutual improvement, and elevating the profession to its just intellectual and moral influence on the community.” The individuals at that St. Louis meeting became the founders of the Missouri State Teachers Association, a professional association for Missouri educators. To quote the first constitution, the group's purpose was “to promote the sacred interests of education by uniting the different members advancing their mutual improvement, and elevating the profession to its just intellectual and moral influence on the community.”

Membership was open to teachers and others actively engaged in promoting the interests of education.

Two significant events occurred in 1857. First, an agent was employed to represent the organization; this position became known as executive secretary in 1915 and was later changed to executive director. Second, a publication called The Missouri Journal for Education was printed and distributed. It was changed to The Missouri Educator for a few years. These publications were the forerunners of School and Community magazine, which became a monthly periodical in 1920 and is still published quarterly today.

MSTA found its political voice quickly by successfully lobbying the 1870 Missouri legislature to approve funds for teacher colleges in Kirksville and Warrensburg.

MSTA initiated the Reading Circle program in 1892 to encourage students of all ages to read.

Since its founding, MSTA has been involved with nearly every piece of significant education legislation in Missouri. In fact, many times, the original legislation was drafted at MSTA headquarters. MSTA helped pass a teacher retirement system first in St. Louis in 1943 and then statewide in 1945.

In 1991, MSTA participated in a lawsuit challenging equity in the Foundation Formula. The association supported the 1993 Outstanding Schools Act, which included a new foundation formula, funding increase and required minimum salary for teachers with a master's and 10 years of service.

The association was divided into four auxiliary associations in 1878 and eight territorial divisions in 1917. Today, MSTA encompasses 10 regions. Each region has a governing body and elects members to the state Executive Board. Representation is proportional to membership.

1900 was the year that the organization became incorporated and underwent a name change to become known as the Missouri State Teachers Association. This began our existence as a corporate body, and we continue to maintain a not-for-profit status today.

MSTA has had many important successes in the Missouri Legislature. Victories include a minimum school term, compulsory school attendance, state board of education, child labor laws, free textbooks, school consolidation, equal educational opportunities for all children, transportation for students, the teacher retirement system, school bus safety laws, the school foundation program, a code of professional ethics, and a revised Missouri Constitution that included sections on education and taxation, especially school levies.

In its efforts to protect the interests of education and educators through the years, MSTA has also participated in many court cases. Suits were initiated concerning diversion of state taxes, reduction of state school funds, securing a share of insurance fines, the governor's veto of school appropriations, discipline of students by teachers, constitutionality of a majority vote, and constitutionality of the state cigarette tax. More recently MSTA participated in suits relating to the equality of a revised foundation formula, collection of retirement contributions on fringe benefits, and funding cuts of state school appropriations.

The headquarters building was built in 1927 in Columbia and has the distinction of being the first building built by and for a state teachers' organization in the United States. It resembles an English manor house with steep gables, skylights, wooden paneling, leaded glass windows, and carved fireplaces and entry way. The building was placed on the National Register of Historic Places in 1980. Members are welcome there whenever they visit Columbia. The headquarters staff began to grow in 1938 with the addition of an assistant secretary. This growth continued, and today the staff consists of 27 professionals and 25 support staff at headquarters and in our regional offices located throughout the state.

Until 1972 MSTA was a part of the National Education Association — in fact, they were one of its founding organizations. Two major factors — basic differences in philosophy and NEA's unification policy — contributed to the disaffiliation with NEA. NEA's insistence that CTAs, MSTA districts, and the state organization unify with NEA into one dues-structured organization led the Assembly of Delegates to vote in 1972 to remain independent so that every Missouri educator would have the choice of whether or not to join a professional association instead of a union.

Other MSTA victories include:

- 1982: MSTA successfully campaigned for Proposition C, which significantly increased funding for Missouri schools.
- 1985: Excellence in Education Act passed, including a provision for minimum teacher salaries.
- 1995: "25 and Out" becomes a retirement option.
- 2003: MSTA's teacher certification bill passes, replacing the old three-tiered system with a simplified two-tier system.
- 2004: MSTA joins a coalition that challenges equity and adequacy in the foundation formula, resulting in a new formula in 2005 and a boost in the minimum teacher salary.

More than a century and a half later after its founding, MSTA has grown to be Missouri's largest teacher association. With more than 45,000 members, MSTA is also one of the largest independent teacher associations in the United States.
