= National Register of Historic Places listings in Marion County, West Virginia =

Location of Marion County in West Virginia

This is a list of the National Register of Historic Places listings in Marion County, West Virginia.

This is intended to be a complete list of the properties and districts on the National Register of Historic Places in Marion County, West Virginia, United States. The locations of National Register properties and districts for which the latitude and longitude coordinates are included below, may be seen in an online map.

There are 24 properties and districts listed on the National Register in the county.

This National Park Service list is complete through NPS recent listings posted March 21, 2025.

Contents: Counties in West Virginia

Barbour - Berkeley - Boone - Braxton - Brooke - Cabell - Calhoun - Clay - Doddridge - Fayette - Gilmer - Grant - Greenbrier - Hampshire - Hancock - Hardy - Harrison - Jackson - Jefferson - Kanawha - Lewis - Lincoln - Logan - Marion - Marshall - Mason - McDowell - Mercer - Mineral - Mingo - Monongalia - Monroe - Morgan - Nicholas - Ohio - Pendleton - Pleasants - Pocahontas - Preston - Putnam - Raleigh - Randolph - Ritchie - Roane - Summers - Taylor - Tucker - Tyler - Upshur - Wayne - Webster - Wetzel - Wirt - Wood - Wyoming

== Current listings ==
	Name on the Register	Image	Date listed	Location	City or town	Description
1	Amos Farmstead Historic District		March 28, 2024 (#100010183)	309 Gilboa Road; 39°32′47″N 80°11′59″W	Fairmont vicinity	
2	Barrackville Covered Bridge	Barrackville Covered Bridge	March 30, 1973 (#73001921)	County Route 21 over Buffalo Creek; 39°30′21″N 80°10′05″W	Barrackville	
3	Colonial Apartments	Colonial Apartments	July 26, 2006 (#06000653)	2 E. Garden Ln. 39°29′00″N 80°09′54″W	Fairmont	
4	Dunbar School	Dunbar School	April 28, 2015 (#15000188)	103 High St. 39°29′12″N 80°08′48″W	Fairmont	
5	Fairmont Downtown Historic District	Fairmont Downtown Historic District	August 15, 1995 (#95001008)	Along Jackson, Adams, Washington and Quincy Sts. and Cleveland and Fairmont Aves. 39°28′57″N 80°08′39″W	Fairmont	
6	Fairmont Normal School Administration Building	Fairmont Normal School Administration Building	March 28, 1994 (#94000216)	Junction of Locust Ave. and Bryant St. 39°28′59″N 80°09′37″W	Fairmont	
7	Fairmont Senior High School	Fairmont Senior High School	March 22, 2002 (#02000254)	1 Loop Park; 39°28′43″N 80°09′26″W	Fairmont	
8	Thomas W. Fleming House	Thomas W. Fleming House	August 29, 1979 (#79002587)	300 1st St. 39°28′53″N 80°08′41″W	Fairmont	
9	Fleming-Watson Historic District	Fleming-Watson Historic District	November 29, 2001 (#01001330)	Approximately bounded by Fairmont Ave., Second, Fay Sts., Apple Ct, Green, Emerson Sts., Coleman Ave., Seventh St., Outlook; 39°29′N 80°09′W	Fairmont	
10	Hamilton Round Barn	Hamilton Round Barn	July 9, 1985 (#85001548)	County Route 11; 39°30′59″N 80°20′16″W	Mannington	
11	High Gate	High Gate	April 15, 1982 (#82004326)	801 Fairmont Ave. 39°28′29″N 80°09′10″W	Fairmont	
12	High Level Bridge	High Level Bridge	December 4, 1991 (#91001734)	Jefferson St. across the Monongahela River; 39°28′57″N 80°08′27″W	Fairmont	
13	Jacobs-Hutchinson Block	Jacobs-Hutchinson Block	July 21, 1995 (#95000874)	201-209 Adams St. 39°29′05″N 80°08′38″W	Fairmont	
14	Mannington Historic District	Mannington Historic District	November 22, 1995 (#95001313)	Roughly bounded by High, Clarksburg and Howard Sts. and Buffalo Creek; 39°31′44″N 80°20′39″W	Mannington	
15	Marion County Courthouse and Sheriff's House	Marion County Courthouse and Sheriff's House	May 29, 1979 (#79003149)	Adams and Jefferson Sts. 39°29′06″N 80°08′37″W	Fairmont	
16	Masonic Temple	Masonic Temple	April 9, 1993 (#93000218)	320 Jefferson St. 39°29′08″N 80°08′34″W	Fairmont	
17	Thomas C. Miller Public School	Thomas C. Miller Public School	May 8, 2013 (#13000263)	2 Pennsylvania Ave. 39°29′20″N 80°08′30″W	Fairmont	
18	George Pinkney Morgan House	George Pinkney Morgan House	May 1, 2003 (#03000348)	County Route 19/3; 39°32′01″N 80°05′42″W	Rivesville	
19	Mount Zion Baptist Church		July 13, 2023 (#100009141)	501 Cleveland Ave. 39°29′11″N 80°08′49″W	Fairmont	
20	Prickett's Fort	Prickett's Fort	February 13, 1974 (#74002404)	Address Restricted; located at Prickett's Fort State Park; 39°30′55″N 80°05′53″W	Fairmont	
21	Jacob Prickett, Jr. Log House	Jacob Prickett, Jr. Log House	April 20, 1979 (#79002588)	South of Montana off County Route 72; 39°31′07″N 80°06′01″W	Montana	
22	Shaw House	Shaw House	September 14, 1988 (#88001461)	425 Morgantown Ave. 39°28′50″N 80°07′56″W	Fairmont	
23	Wilson School	Wilson School	November 29, 2001 (#01001331)	917 E. Main St. 39°31′32″N 80°20′05″W	Mannington	
24	Woodlawn Cemetery	Woodlawn Cemetery	April 14, 2004 (#04000305)	335 Maple Ave. 39°29′37″N 80°08′14″W	Fairmont	

== See also ==
- List of National Historic Landmarks in West Virginia
- National Register of Historic Places listings in West Virginia
