= Fleming House =

Fleming House may refer to:

in the United States (by state)

- Fleming House, Pasadena, California, one of California Institute of Technology's dormitories
- Guy and Margaret Fleming House, San Diego, California, listed on the National Register of Historic Places in San Diego County, California
- Fleming-Hanington House, Denver, Colorado, listed on the National Register of Historic Places in Downtown Denver, Colorado
- Fleming House (Smyrna, Delaware), listed on the National Register of Historic Places in New Castle County, Delaware
- Thomas W. Fleming House (Flemingsburg, Kentucky), listed on the National Register of Historic Places in Fleming County, Kentucky
- Thomas Fleming House (Sherborn, Massachusetts), Sherborn, Massachusetts, listed on the NRHP in Massachusetts
- Fleming Hall, Silver City, New Mexico, listed on the National Register of Historic Places in Grant County, New Mexico
- James L. Fleming House, Greenville, North Carolina, listed on the National Register of Historic Places in Pitt County, North Carolina
- Molly Fleming House, California, Pennsylvania, listed on the National Register of Historic Places in Washington County, Pennsylvania
- John M. Fleming Home Place, Collierville, Tennessee, listed on the National Register of Historic Places in Shelby County, Tennessee
- Fleming-Welder House, Victoria, Texas, listed on the National Register of Historic Places in Victoria County, Texas
- Thomas W. Fleming House (Fairmont, West Virginia), listed on the National Register of Historic Places in Marion County, West Virginia
- Fleming-Watson Historic District, Fairmont, West Virginia, listed on the NRHP in West Virginia
- David and Lucy Tarr Fleming Mansion, Wellsburg, West Virginia, listed on the National Register of Historic Places in Brooke County, West Virginia

== See also ==
- Thomas Fleming House (disambiguation)
