= A. C. Lyons =

American architect

Andrew Charles Lyons
- Born: October 2, 1873; Somerset County, Pennsylvania
- Died: March 16, 1942 (aged 68); Fairmont, West Virginia
- Occupation: Architect
- Practice: Munsch, Huemme & Lyons; S. Munsch & Co.; A. C. Lyons

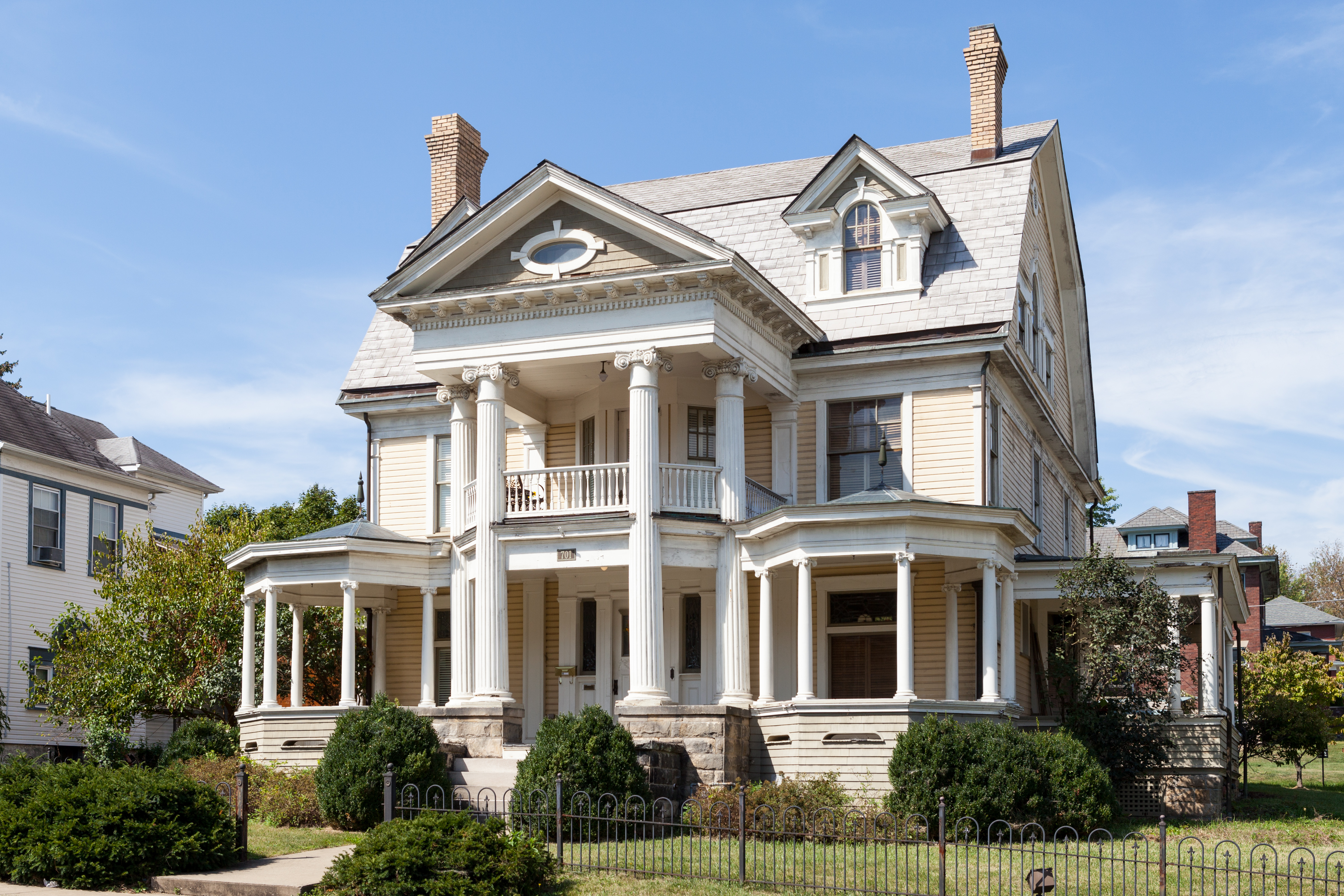
C. E. Hutchinson House, Fairmont, 1900.

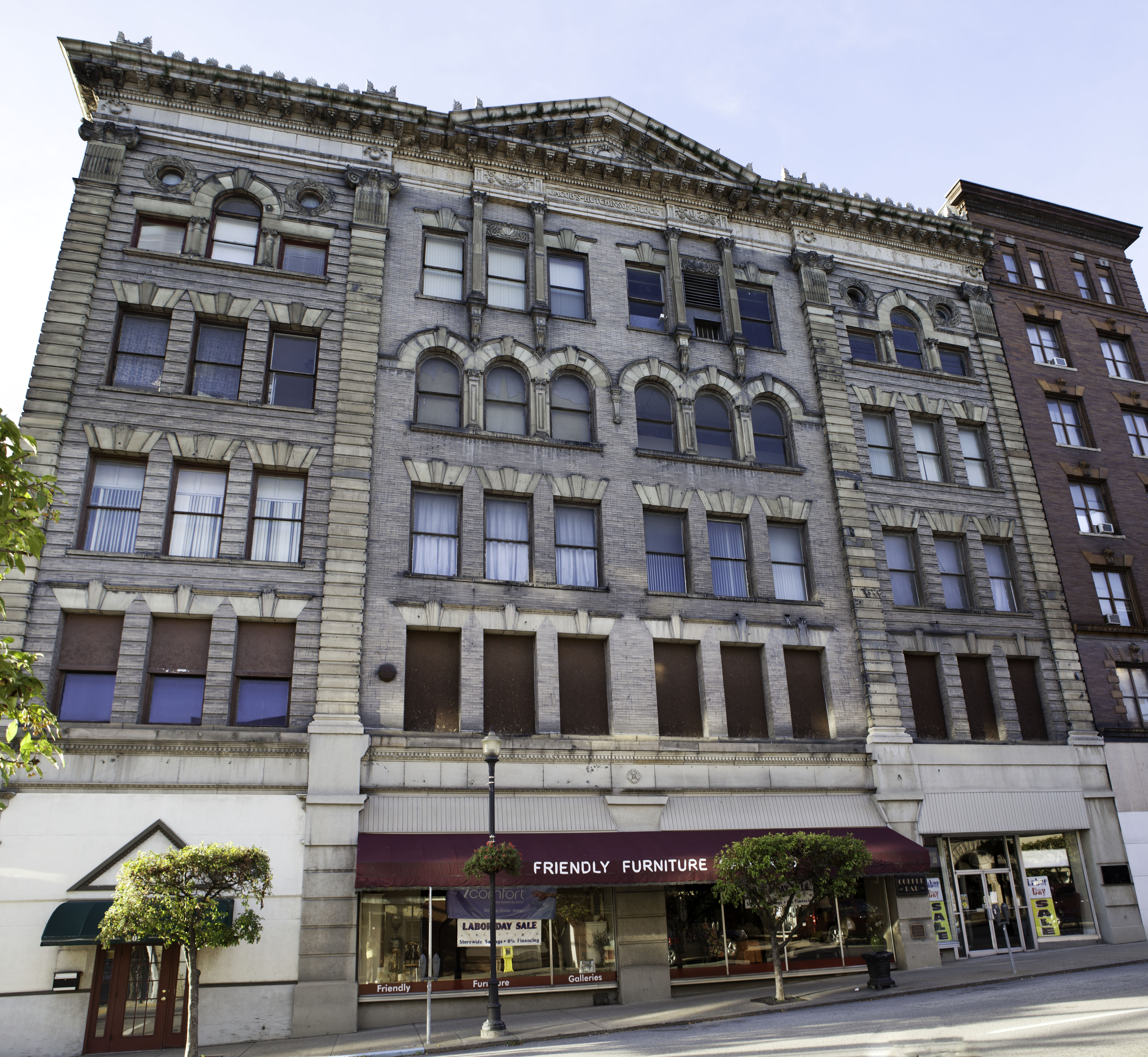
Jacobs-Hutchinson Block, Fairmont, 1902.

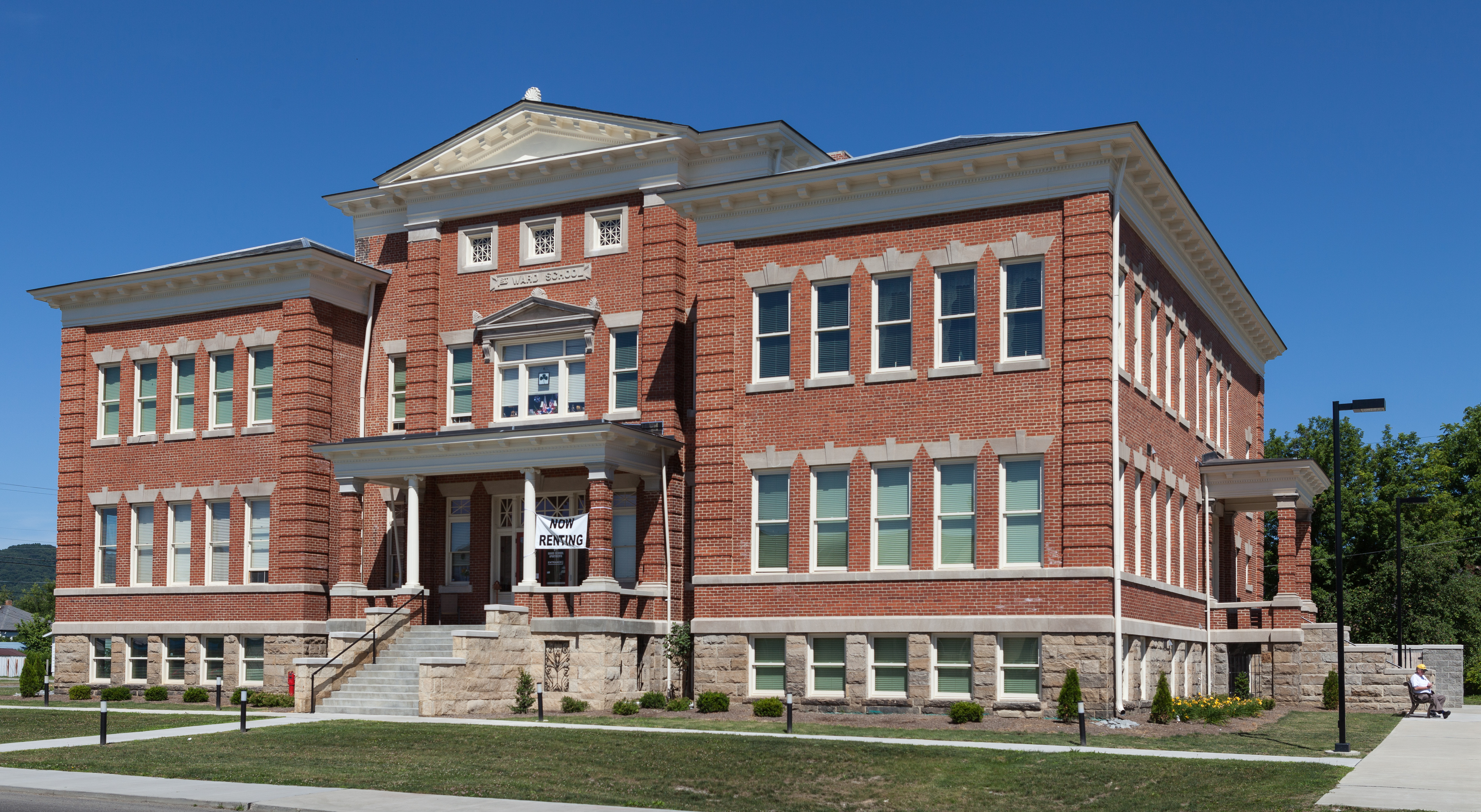
First Ward School, Elkins, 1907.

A. C. Lyons (1873-1942) was an American architect from Fairmont, West Virginia.

== Life and career ==
A. C. Lyons was born in Somerset County, Pennsylvania in 1873. When he was an infant, the family moved to Pittsburgh, before moving on to Huntington, West Virginia, in 1880. The family later returned to Pittsburgh, where Lyons finished his schooling.

Lyons began his architectural career in 1888, in the office of Pittsburgh architect Solomon Munsch. In 1891 he went to Fairmont to manage a branch office for the firm, now Munsch & Huemme. In 1894 this was expanded to a partnership, Munsch, Huemme & Lyons, with offices in Pittsburgh and Fairmont. The firm became known as S. Munsch & Company upon Huemme's departure. After Munsch's death in 1898, Lyons established his own office in Fairmont.

Lyons quickly grew to become one of the most prominent architects in northeast West Virginia. In 1904, he established a branch office at Elkins, a small city then undergoing rapid growth. He was also, around 1902, associated with John C. Tibbets as Lyons & Tibbets. He practiced until the 1930s, but by then he lost prominence to other architects, including R. A. Gillis, Jones & Nuzum, and Coy H. Snider.

After designing many grand homes, buildings and schools in Fairmont and North Central West Virginia, Lyons relocated to Pittsburgh in 1933 and formed a partnership with J. Hubert Wagner to establish a river barge transport company known as Lyons River Transportation. As it prospered, he traded his drafting table and t-squares for a new career as a riverboat captain. The flagship was the "Katie Lyons," a 532-ton sternwheeler. On March 16, 1942, a tragic accident claimed his life. The "Katie Lyons" was travelling to Point Pleasant, WV on the Ohio River, which was nearly at flood stage. The boat, caught by swift current and hampered by heavy fog, smashed sideways into one of the piers of the railroad bridge between Benwood, WV and Bellaire, Ohio. The boat sank rapidly. Captain Lyons, the pilot and second engineer were trapped inside the pilot house. However, 14 members of the crew made it to shore. Nearly a week later, his body was recovered. Lyons, his wife Katherine, and their daughter Beatrice are all buried in Woodlawn Cemetery, Fairmont.

== Legacy ==
At least two buildings designed by Lyons have been placed on the National Register of Historic Places, and several more contribute or did contribute to listed historic districts. In 2013, local historian Dr. M. Raymond Alvarez called Lyons "the primary architect, literally, of Fairmont’s transition from a sleepy county seat to a bustling commercial center".

== Architectural works ==
- 1894 - Merchants and Mechanics Savings Bank Building, 101 W Main St, Grafton, West Virginia
- 1895 - First M. E. Church (remodeling), 118 Clarksburg St, Mannington, West Virginia
- 1898 - McCoy Building, 109 Fairmont Ave, Fairmont, West Virginia
  - Demolished.
- 1900 - Clyde E. Hutchinson House, 701 Benoni Ave, Fairmont, West Virginia
- 1900 - Sample Building, 221 Monroe St, Fairmont, West Virginia
- 1902 - Thomas W. Arnett House, 707 Benoni Ave, Fairmont, West Virginia
- 1902 - Jacobs-Hutchinson Block, 205 Adams St, Fairmont, West Virginia
- 1903 - Jacobs Building, 316 Monroe St, Fairmont, West Virginia
- 1904 - Randolph Hotel, Railroad Ave, Elkins, West Virginia
  - Demolished.
- 1905 - Fifth Ward School (former), 601 Locust Ave, Fairmont, West Virginia
- 1905 - Woman's Hall, Fairmont State Normal School, Fairmont, West Virginia
  - On the former Fairmont Avenue campus. Demolished in 1924.
- 1907 - First Ward School (former), 1301 S Davis Ave, Elkins, West Virginia
- 1907 - Scott Building, 309 Scott St, Elkins, West Virginia
- 1907 - Third Ward School (former), 978 Harrison Ave, Elkins, West Virginia
- 1908 - Rivesville School (former), 168 Jasper St, Rivesville, West Virginia
- 1910 - Consolidation Coal Office Building, 78 Millers Creek Rd, Van Lear, Kentucky
- 1916 - Professional Building, Fairmont Building and Investment Co. Current Owner A. D. Ashley 309 Cleveland Ave, Fairmont, West Virginia
  - With Coy H. Snider.
