= Thomas Fleming House =

Thomas Fleming House or Thomas W. Fleming House may refer to:

- Thomas W. Fleming House (Flemingsburg, Kentucky), listed on the National Register of Historic Places in Fleming County, Kentucky
- Thomas Fleming House (Sherborn, Massachusetts), listed on the NRHP in Massachusetts
- Thomas W. Fleming House (Fairmont, West Virginia), listed on the National Register of Historic Places in Marion County, West Virginia

== See also ==
- Fleming House (disambiguation)
