= Colonial Apartments =

Colonial Apartments may refer to: (sorted by state, then city/town)

- Linwood Colonial Apartments, Indianapolis, Indiana, listed on the National Register of Historic Places (NRHP) in Marion County
- Colonial Apartments (Bangor, Maine), listed on the NRHP in Penobscot County
- Colonial Apartments (Carthage, Missouri), listed on the NRHP in Jasper County
- Colonial Apartments (Fairmont, West Virginia), listed on the NRHP in Marion County
