= Mannington Historic District =

Historic district in West Virginia, United States

- U.S. National Register of Historic Places
- U.S. Historic district
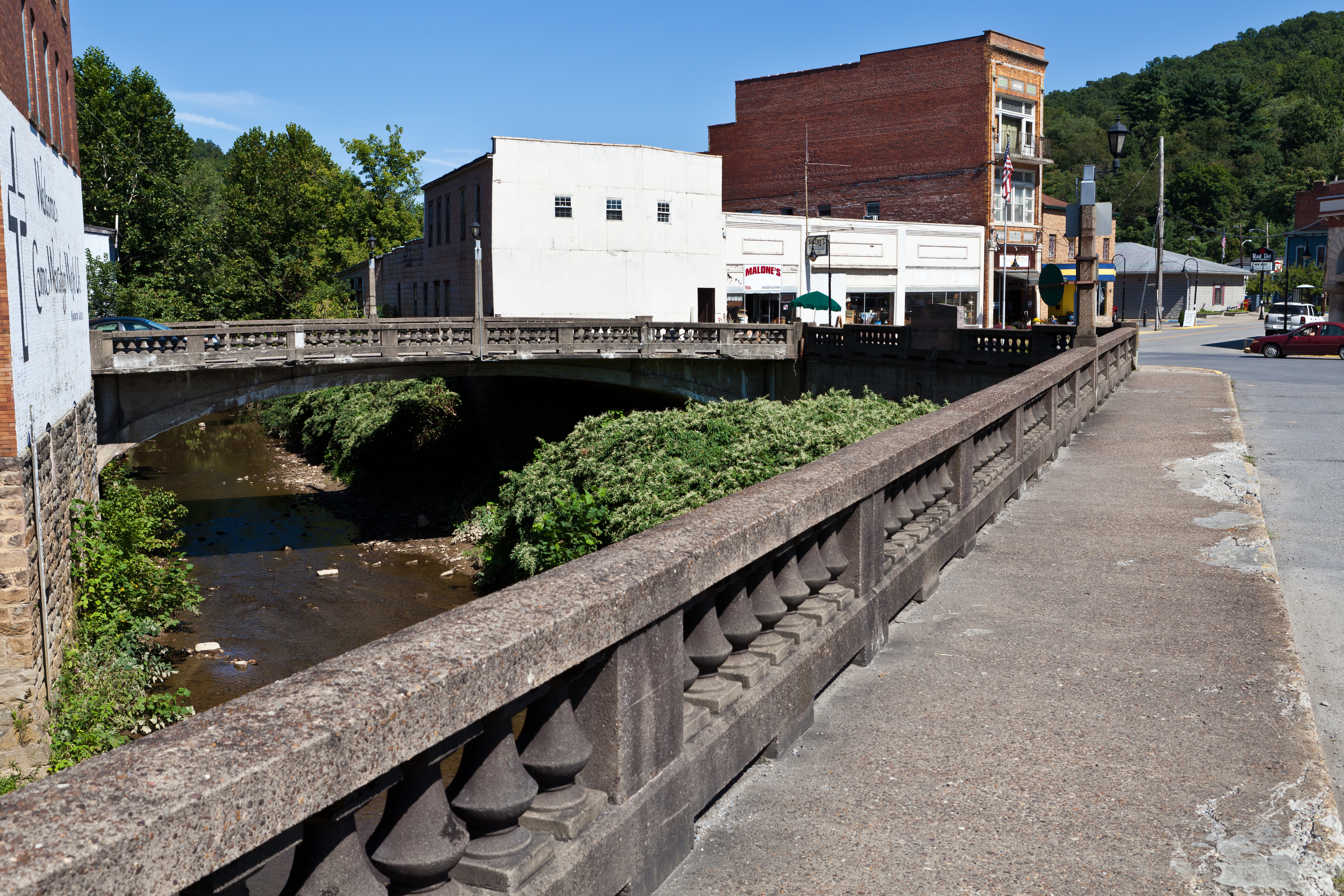
- Mannington Historic District, September 2013

- Location within West Virginia Location within the United States
- Location: Roughly bounded by High, Clarksburg and Howard Sts. and Buffalo Cr., Mannington, West Virginia
- Coordinates: 39°31′44″N 80°20′39″W
- Area: 156 acres (63 ha)
- Built: 1855
- Architect: M.F. Giesey
- Architectural style: Colonial, Mid 19th Century Revival, Late Victorian
- NRHP reference No.: 95001313
- Added to NRHP: November 22, 1995

Mannington Historic District is a historic district located at Mannington, West Virginia, United States, that is listed on the National Register of Historic Places.

== Description ==
The district includes 207 contributing buildings in Mannington's central business district and surrounding residential areas. Notable buildings include the railroad depot (c. 1896), Exchange Bank Building (c. 1897), U.S. Post Office (c. 1938), Colonial Building (c. 1904), the Blackshere House (c. 1900), the Bartlett House (c. 1900), First National Bank Building (c. 1909), the Furbee Building (c. 1900), the Hammond House (c. 1855), the Modi Building (1917), and the Mannington District Public High School (1925). The contributing buildings are representative of popular late-19th- and early 20th-century architectural styles.

It was listed on the National Register of Historic Places November 22, 1995.

== See also ==
- National Register of Historic Places listings in Marion County, West Virginia
