= First Ward School =

- U.S. National Register of Historic Places
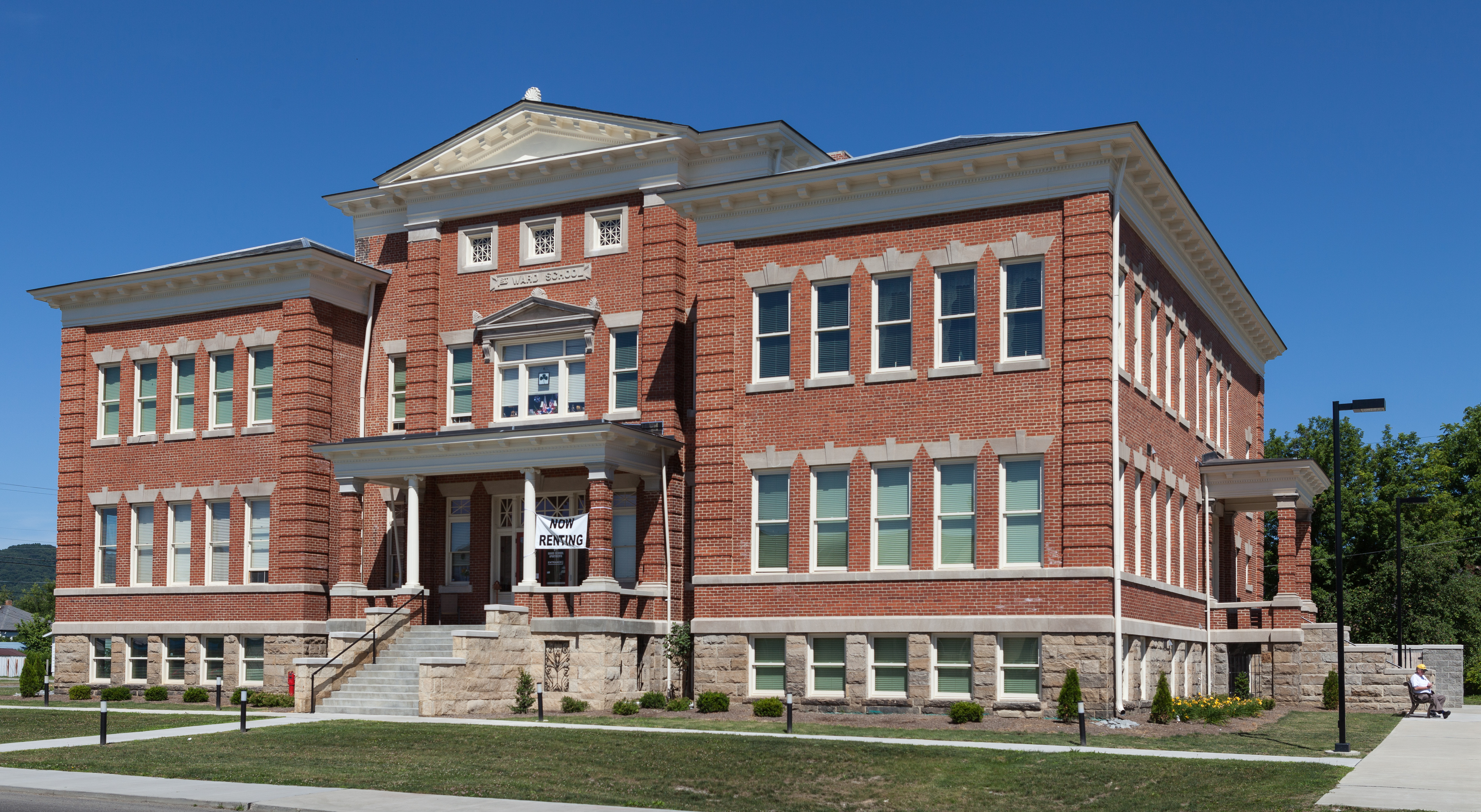
- The west and south sides, from South Davis Avenue in July 2014

- Location within West Virginia Location within the United States
- Location: S. Davis Ave. and 13th St., Elkins, West Virginia
- Coordinates: 38°55′01″N 79°51′05″W
- Area: 1 acre (0.40 ha)
- Built: 1907
- Architect: A. C. Lyons
- Architectural style: Classical Revival
- NRHP reference No.: 09001193
- Added to NRHP: December 30, 2009

First Ward School is a historic school building located at Elkins, Randolph County, West Virginia. It was built in 1907, is a two-story brick masonry structure, with full basement and sandstone trim. It has a slate covered hipped roof and is in the Classical Revival style. The interior features hard maple flooring and quarter-sawn oak staircases, wainscotings, built-in bookcases, doors, moldings, and trim work. It was built as a combined elementary and high school. It served as an elementary school alone from 1926 to 1976, when the building was retired as a school.

It was listed on the National Register of Historic Places in 2009.
