= Jacobs-Hutchinson Block =

- U.S. National Register of Historic Places
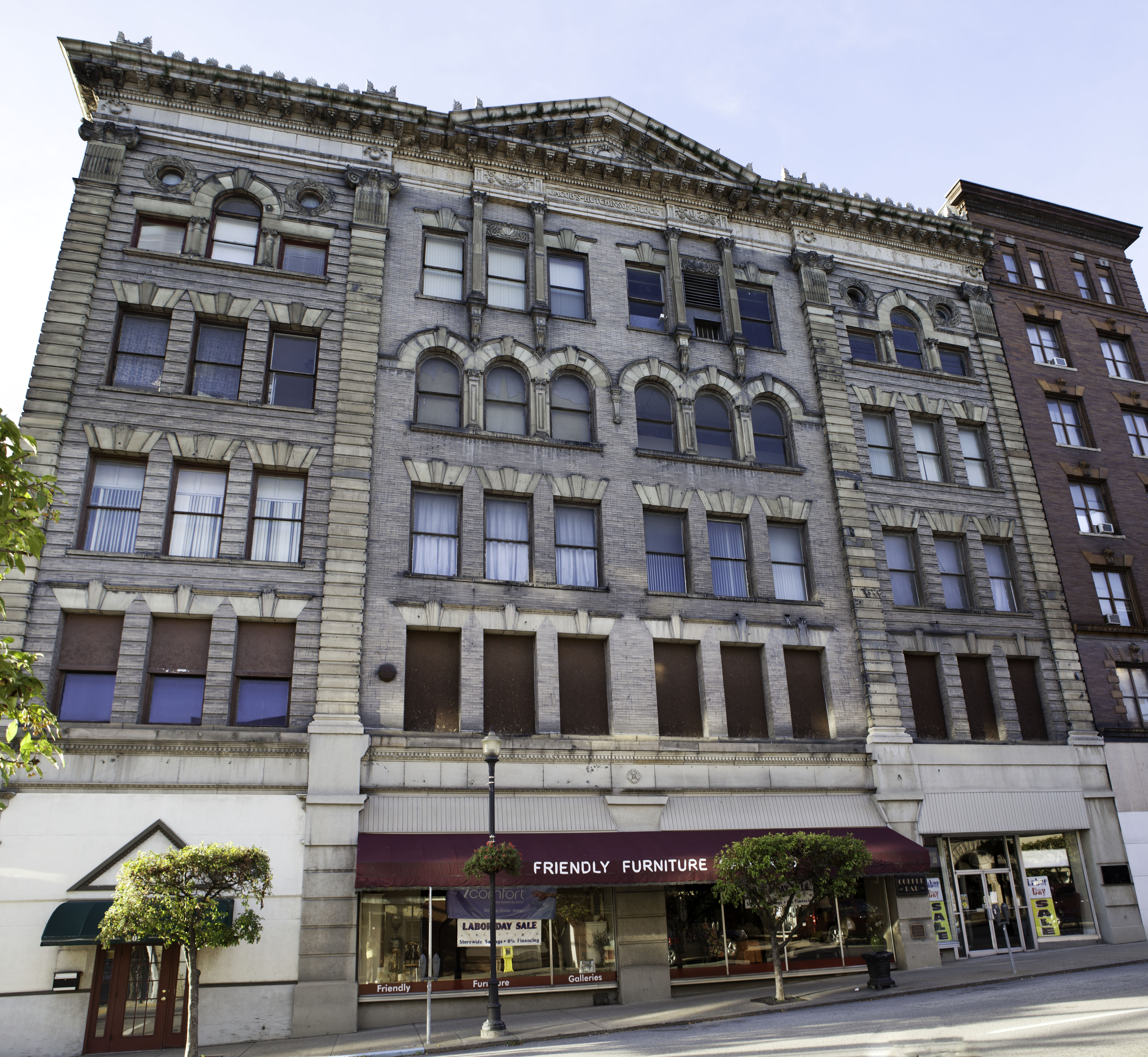

- Location within West Virginia Location within the United States
- Location: 201--209 Adams St., Fairmont, West Virginia
- Coordinates: 39°29′4.6″N 80°8′37.7″W
- Area: less than one acre
- Built: 1902
- Built by: Holbert & Spedden
- Architect: A. C. Lyons
- Architectural style: Renaissance
- NRHP reference No.: 95000874
- Added to NRHP: July 21, 1995

Jacobs-Hutchinson Block, also known as Peoples' National Bank and Friendly Furniture Store, is a historic commercial building located at Fairmont, Marion County, West Virginia. It was built in 1902, and is a five-story commercial structure with a basement and a flat roof in the Renaissance Revival style. It is a steel column and beam structure, sheathed with pressed brick, blue stone, and terra cotta. It rests on a stone foundation. It measures 92 feet by 80 feet deep and 84 feet high. The building has housed department stores, a bank, a furniture store, and law offices.

It was listed on the National Register of Historic Places in 1995.
