= Fleming House (Smyrna, Delaware) =

Historic house in Delaware, US

- U.S. National Register of Historic Places
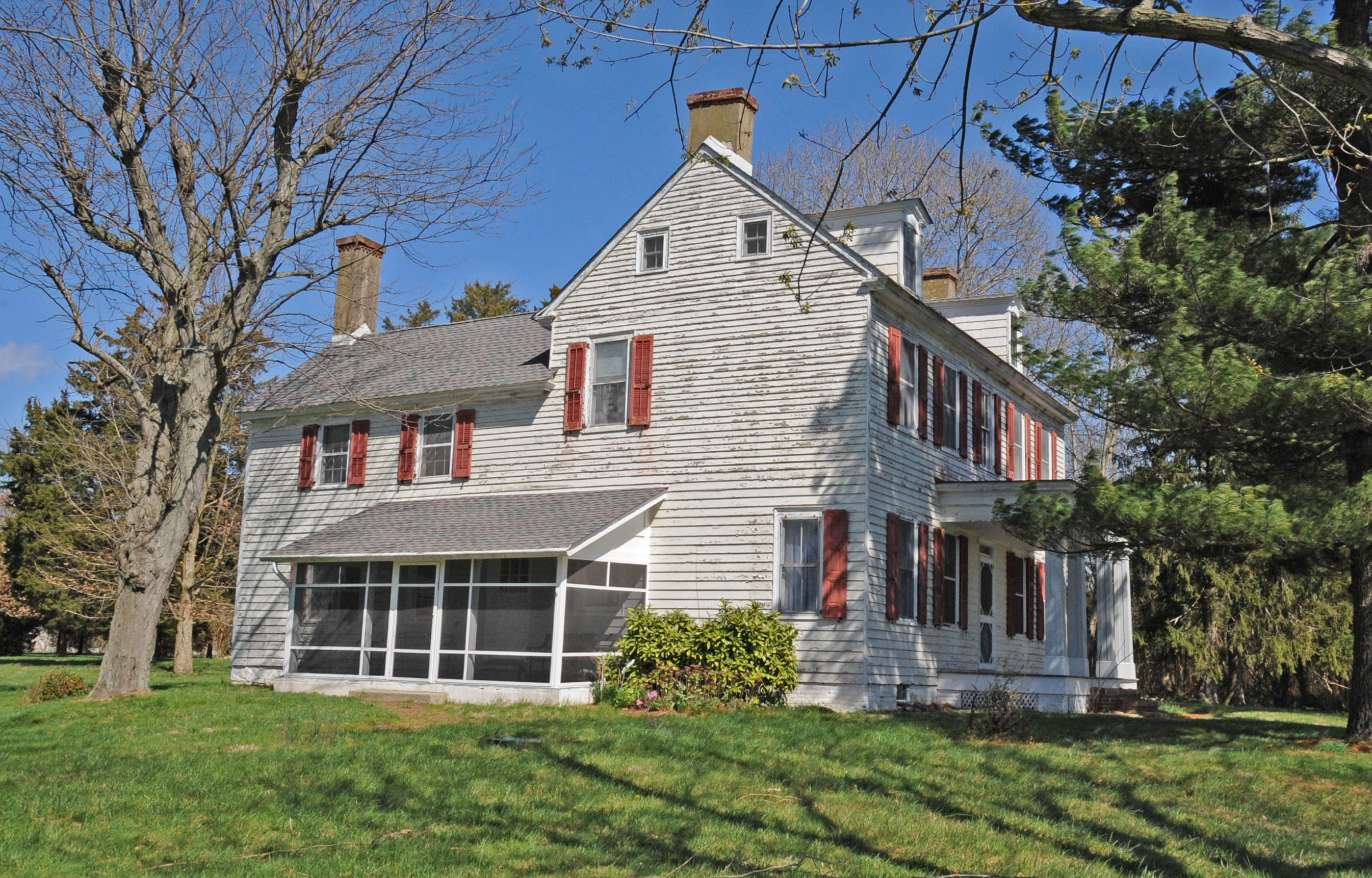

- Location within Delaware Location within the United States
- Location: 992 Flemings Landing Road, near Smyrna, Delaware
- Coordinates: 39.354720°N 75.550934°W
- Area: 3.3 acres (1.3 ha)
- Built: 1830
- Architectural style: Greek Revival
- NRHP reference No.: 80000934
- Added to NRHP: January 31, 1980

Fleming House is a historic home located near Smyrna in New Castle County, Delaware, United States. It was built about 1830, and is a 2 1/2-story, five-bay frame dwelling with a two-story frame wing. The main house has a center hall plan and interior end chimneys. It features a number of exterior and interior Greek Revival style details. Also on the property are a contributing two-story, Late Victorian frame barn and two sheds.

It was listed on the National Register of Historic Places in 1980.
