= David and Lucy Tarr Fleming Mansion =

Historic house in West Virginia, United States

- U.S. National Register of Historic Places
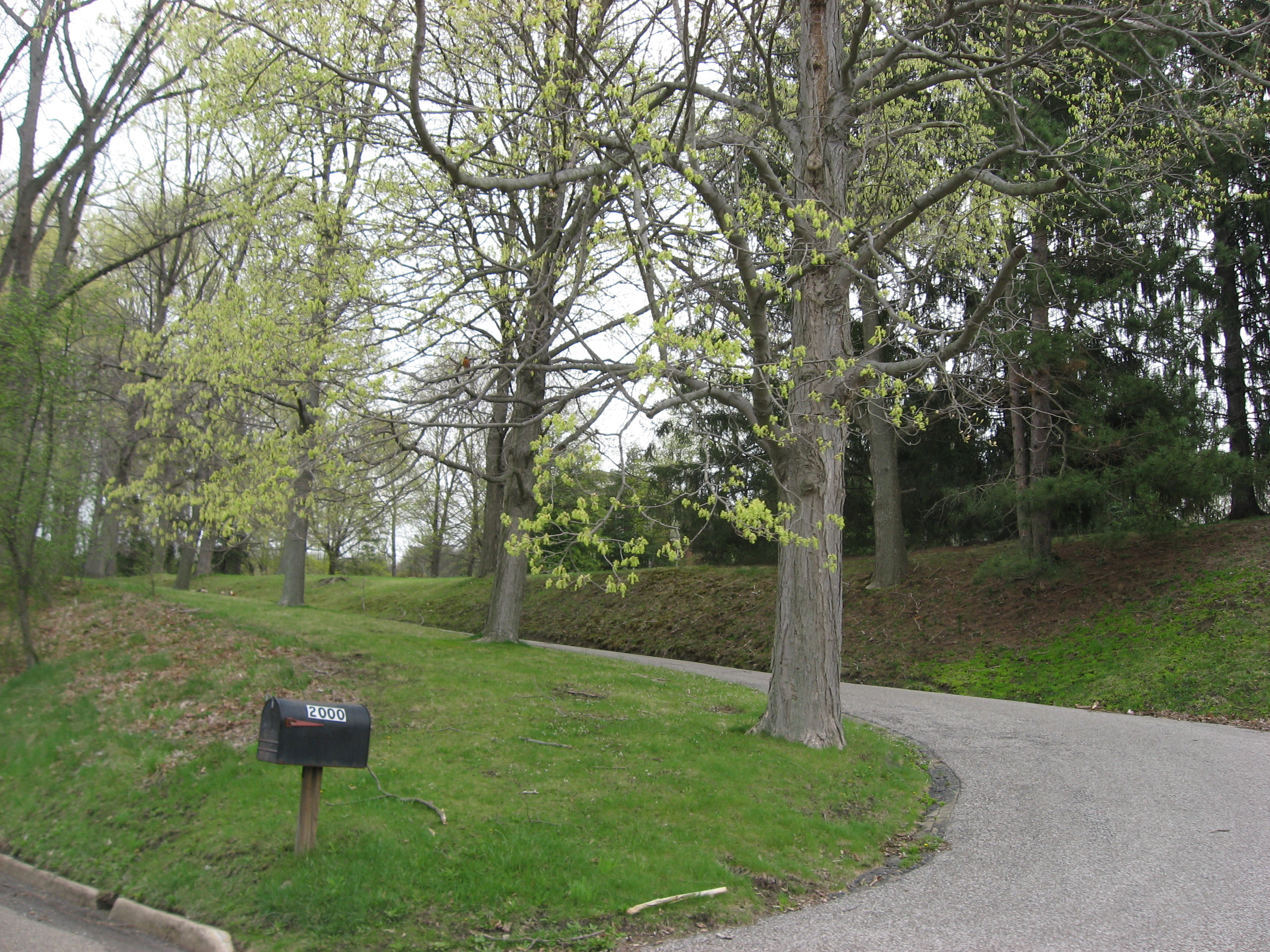
- David and Lucy Tarr Fleming Mansion approach, April 2011

- Location within West Virginia Location within the United States
- Location: 2000 Pleasant Ave., Wellsburg, West Virginia
- Coordinates: 40°16′55″N 80°36′20″W
- Area: 4.5 acres (1.8 ha)
- Built: 1845
- Architectural style: Greek Revival
- MPS: Pleasant Avenue MRA
- NRHP reference No.: 86001073
- Added to NRHP: May 16, 1986

David and Lucy Tarr Fleming Mansion, also known as the Oxtoby Mansion, is a historic home located at Wellsburg, Brooke County, West Virginia. It was built in 1845, and is a 2 1/2-story, five-bay, rectangular brick dwelling with a hipped roof in the Greek Revival style. It sits on a stone ashlar foundation and features a full-length portico with a hipped roof supported by six Ionic order columns. Also on the property are a contributing garage and carriage house.

It was listed on the National Register of Historic Places in 1986.
