= John M. Fleming Home Place =

Historic house in Tennessee, United States

- U.S. National Register of Historic Places
- U.S. Historic district
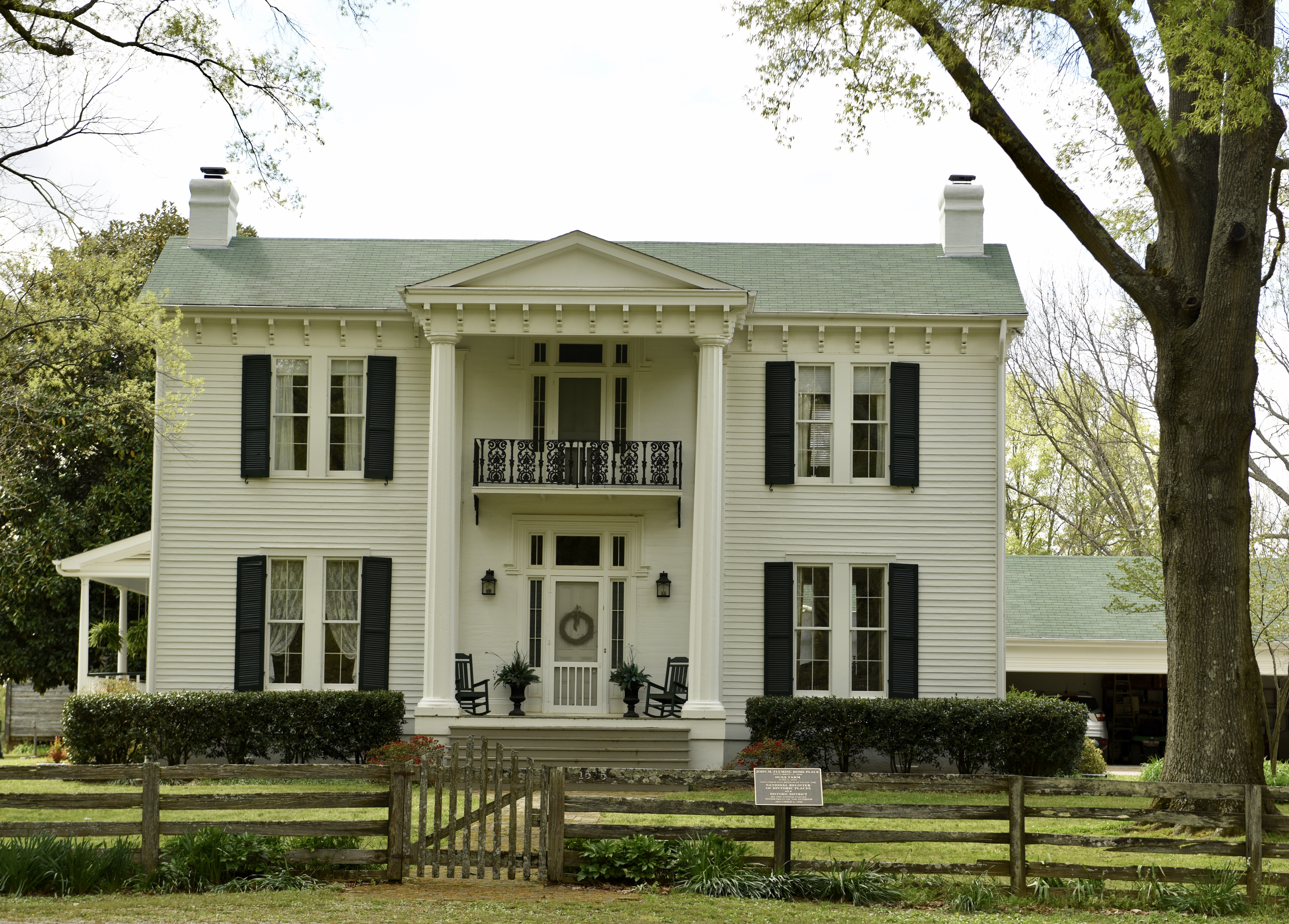
- The John M. Fleming Home Place in 2017

- Location within Tennessee Location within the United States
- Nearest city: Collierville, Tennessee
- Area: 318 acres (129 ha)
- Built: 1850
- Architectural style: Greek Revival, Italianate
- NRHP reference No.: 90001763
- Added to NRHP: December 6, 1990

The John M. Fleming Home Place, also known as Duke Farm, is a historic mansion in Collierville, Tennessee, U.S..

== History ==
The house was built circa 1850 for a South Carolinian couple, John M. Fleming and his wife Eliza Moseley. By 1850, they owned 13 male slaves and 11 female slaves. The grounds included a slave cemetery from 1851 to 1935. After the American Civil War of 1861–1865, slaves were replaced by sharecroppers. Fleming's son, Samuel T. Fleming, lived on the property until 1913, and it was purchased by the Duke family in 1924. The Dukes used sharecroppers until the 1960s.

The house has been listed on the National Register of Historic Places since December 6, 1990.
