= Fairmont Downtown Historic District =

Historic district in West Virginia, United States

- U.S. National Register of Historic Places
- U.S. Historic district
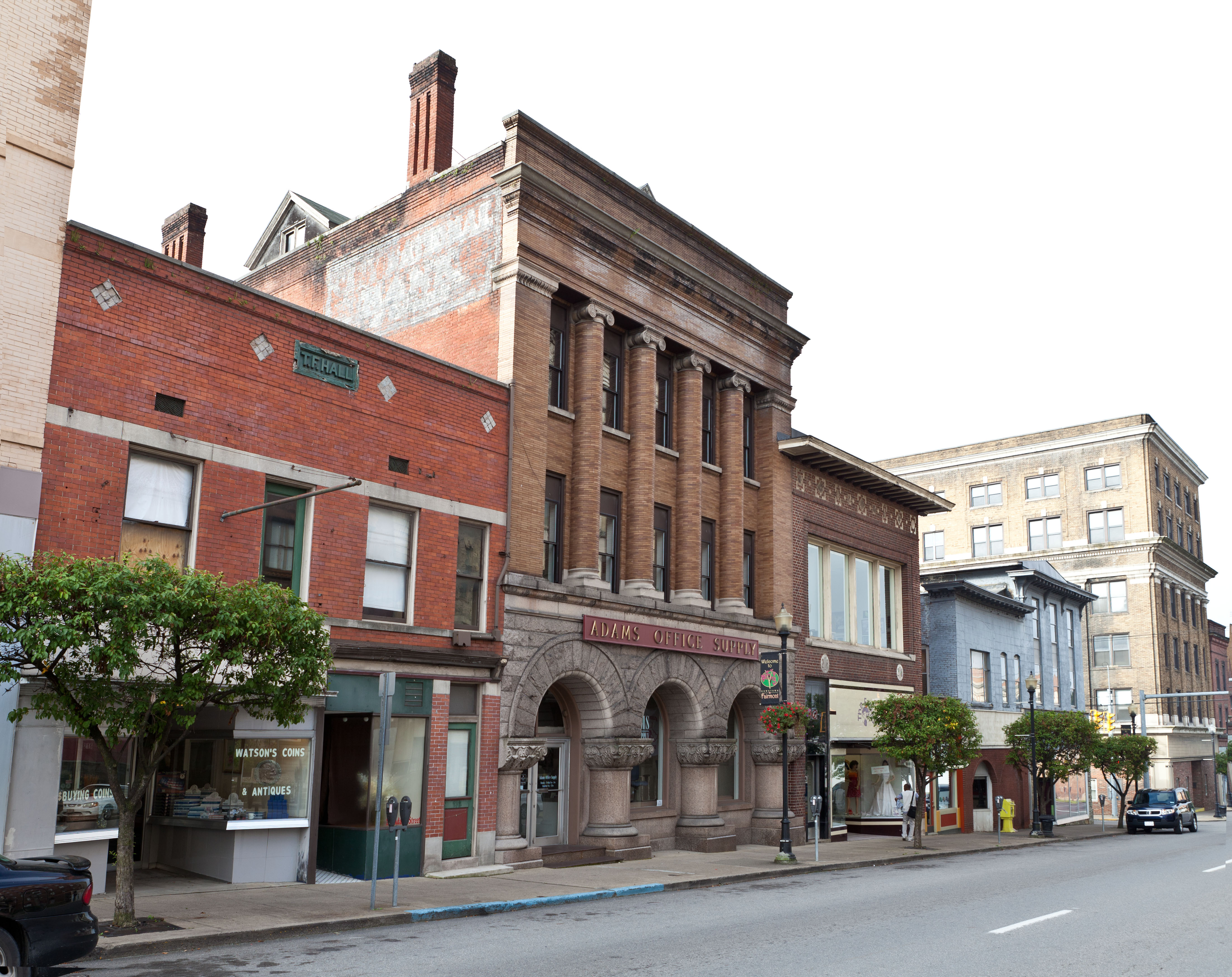

- Location within West Virginia Location within the United States
- Location: Along Jackson, Adams, Washington and Quincy Sts. and Cleveland and Fairmont Aves., Fairmont, West Virginia
- Coordinates: 39°28′57″N 80°8′39″W
- Area: 72 acres (29 ha)
- Architect: Badgley, Charles G.; Lyons, A. C.
- Architectural style: Late 19th And Early 20th Century American Movements, Late 19th And 20th Century Revivals
- NRHP reference No.: 95001008
- Added to NRHP: August 15, 1995

Fairmont Downtown Historic District is a national historic district located at Fairmont, Marion County, West Virginia. The district includes 97 contributing buildings and two contributing structures in Fairmont's central business district. They are in a variety of late 19th- and early 20th-century architectural styles. Notable buildings include the Watson Building (1909–1911), U.S. Court House and Post Office (1940), Monongahela Valley Traction Freight House (1927), the Jacobs and Hutchinson complex, and the Library (1914). The Marion County Courthouse and Sheriff's House and Robert H. Mollohan-Jefferson Street Bridge are located in the district and listed separately on the National Register of Historic Places.

It was listed on the National Register of Historic Places in 1995.

The Downtown Historic District is managed and preserved by the City of Fairmont Historic Preservation Review Commission.

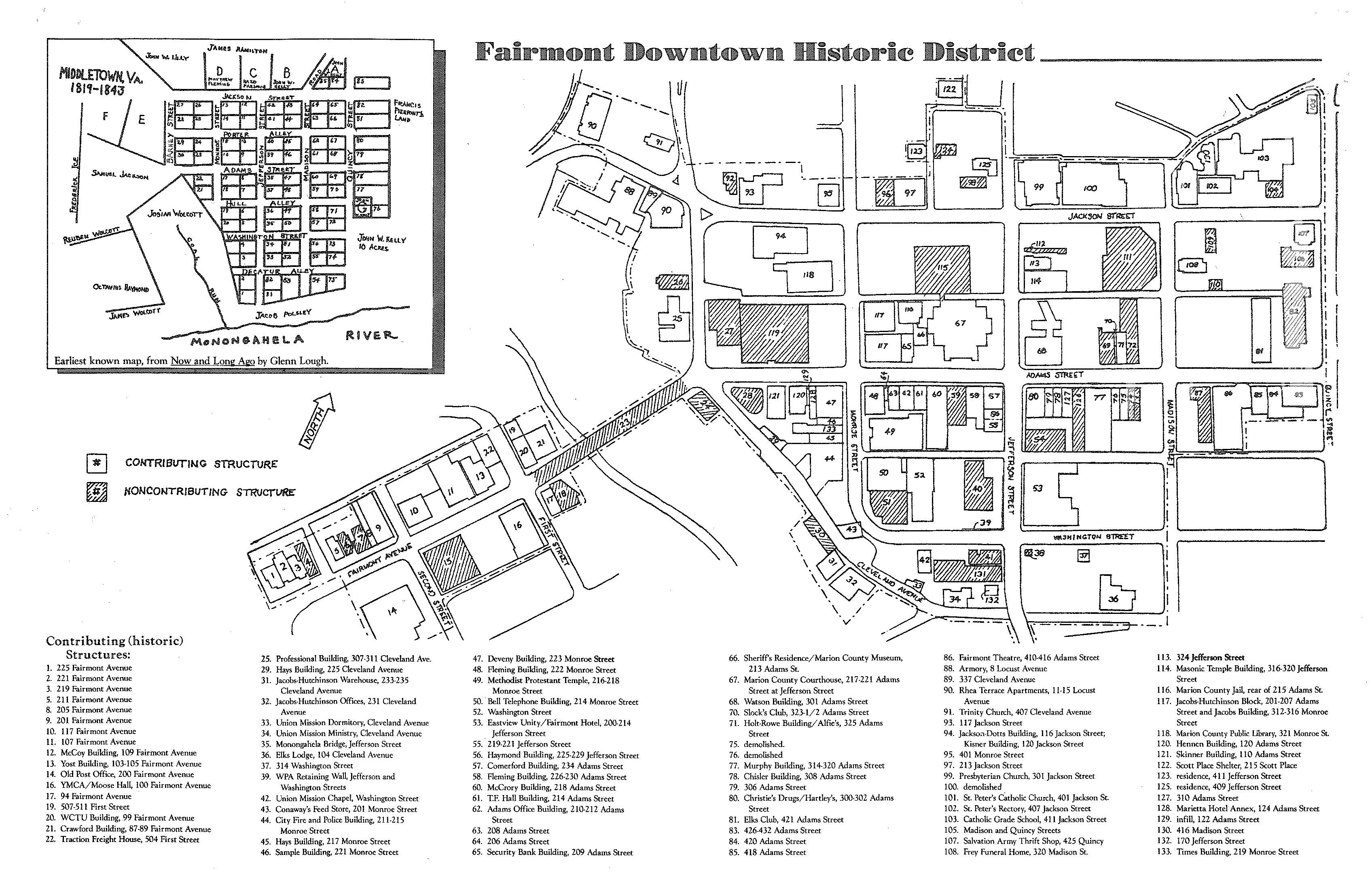
A map of the City of Fairmont Downtown Historic District showing contributing and non-contributing structures.
