= Colonial Apartments (Carthage, Missouri) =

- U.S. National Register of Historic Places
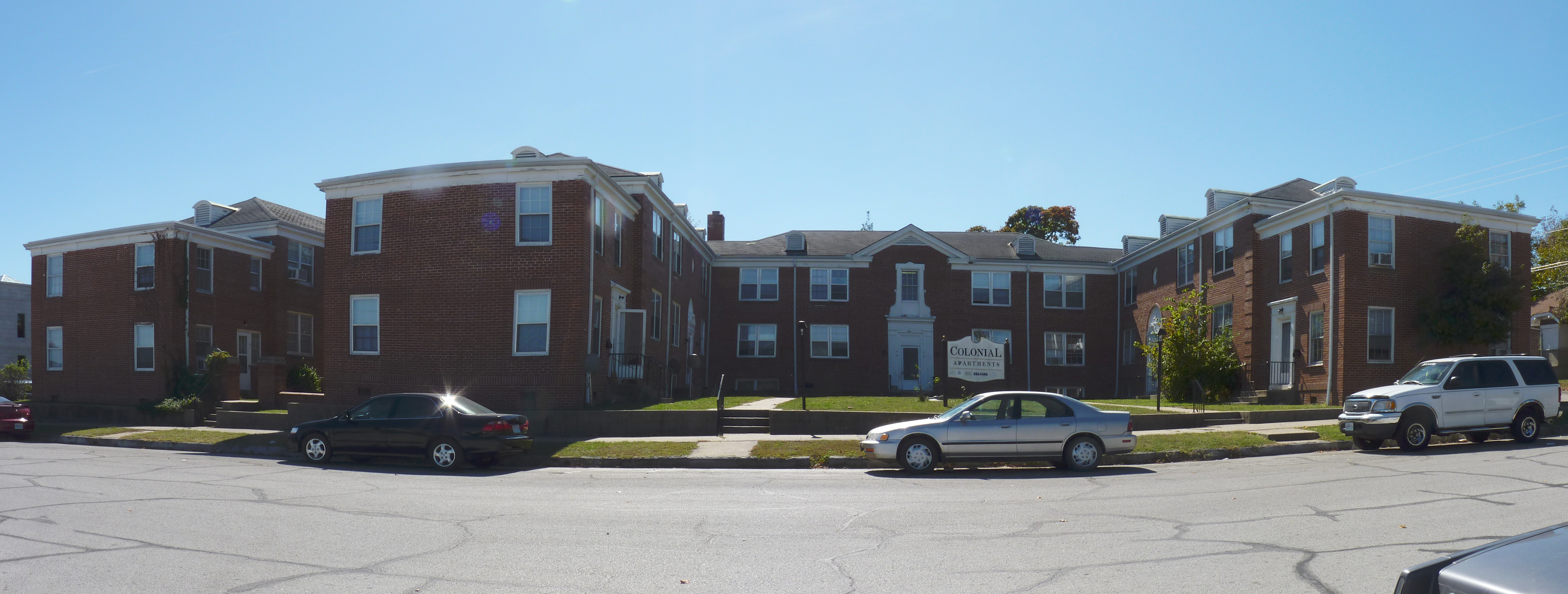
- Colonial Apartments, October 2010

- Location within Missouri Location within the United States
- Location: 406 Walnut St., Carthage, Missouri
- Coordinates: 37°10′29″N 94°18′51″W
- Built: 1948
- Built by: B&G Construction Company
- Architect: Neville, Sharpe, and Simon
- Architectural style: Colonial Revival
- NRHP reference No.: 01000835
- Added to NRHP: August 14, 2001

The Colonial Apartments are two historic apartment buildings located at 406 Walnut St. in Carthage, Jasper County, Missouri. They were designed by Neville, Sharpe, and Simon in the Colonial Revival style and built in 1948 by the B&G Construction Group. They are two-story, red brick building designated Building A and Building B. They have low-pitched hipped roofs with segmental arched dormers.

The complex was listed on the National Register of Historic Places in 2001.
