= Colonial Apartments (Fairmont, West Virginia) =

- U.S. National Register of Historic Places
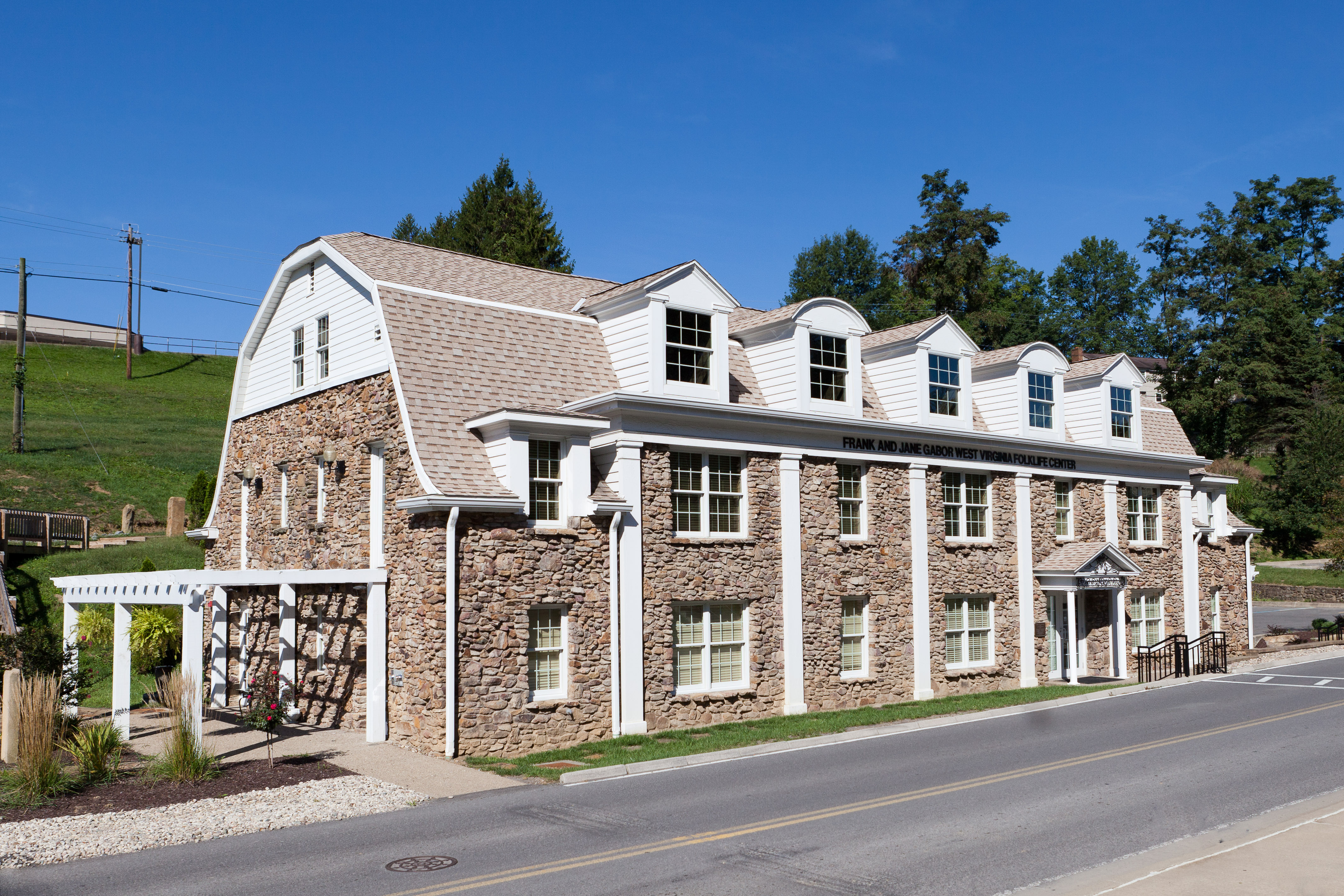
- Colonial Apartments in 2013

- Location within West Virginia Location within the United States
- Location: 2 E. Garden Ln., Fairmont, West Virginia
- Coordinates: 39°29′0″N 80°9′54″W
- Area: less than one acre
- Built: 1900
- Built by: Edward Phillip Kennedy; Donald Kennedy
- Architectural style: Colonial Revival
- NRHP reference No.: 06000653
- Added to NRHP: July 26, 2006

Colonial Apartments, also known as the Kennedy Dairy Barn, is a historic building located at Fairmont, Marion County, West Virginia. It is a three-story, gambrel roof building in the Colonial Revival style. It was built about 1900 as a barn and modified to its present form about 1942. Those modifications included adding a stone veneer, two hip roof porches, and the addition of a small end gable entrance portico with a partial return and Tuscan order columns. Also on the property is two-story side gable former milk house. It was converted to two apartment units at the same time the barn was converted to an apartment building.

It was listed on the National Register of Historic Places in 2006.

In 2009, Fairmont State University converted the building from faculty housing into The Frank and Jane Gabor West Virginia Folklife Center, to support the Folklife-Folklore Studies program at FSU.
