= Thomas Fleming House (Sherborn, Massachusetts) =

Historic house in Massachusetts, United States

- U.S. National Register of Historic Places
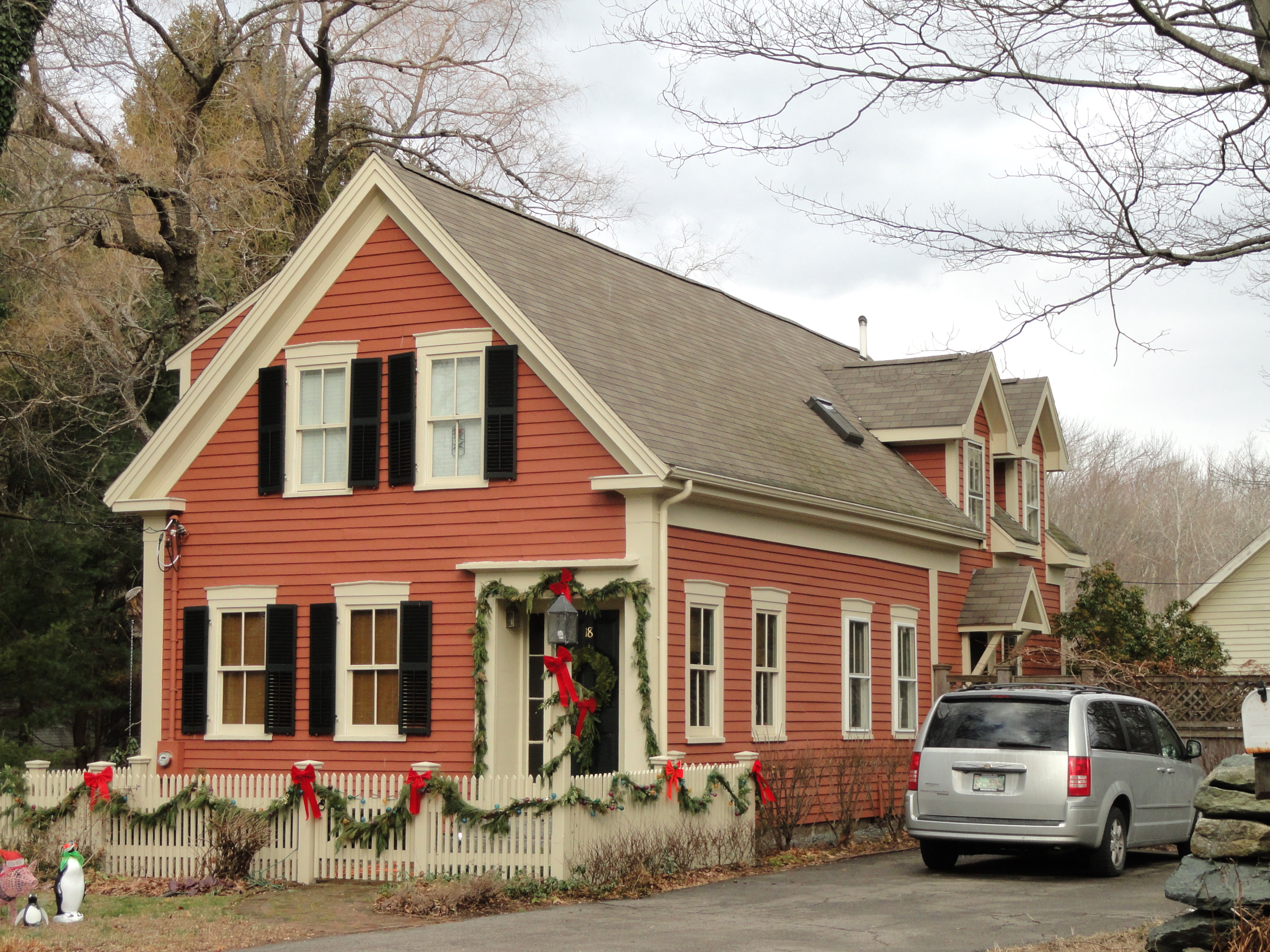

- Location within Massachusetts Location within the United States
- Location: 18 Maple Street, Sherborn, Massachusetts
- Coordinates: 42°14′28″N 71°22′29″W
- Area: 2.57 acres (1.04 ha)
- Built: 1850
- Architectural style: Greek Revival
- MPS: Sherborn MRA
- NRHP reference No.: 86000500
- Added to NRHP: January 3, 1986

The Thomas Fleming House is a historic house located in Sherborn, Massachusetts.

== Description and history ==
The 1 1/2-story wood-frame house was built c. 1850 by Thomas Fleming. It is a well-preserved modest Greek Revival house with a simple door surround. Fleming and his brothers practiced one of the town's cottage industries, willow weaving for the making of baskets and trinket boxes, that proliferated in Sherborn in the mid-19th century.

The house was listed on the National Register of Historic Places on January 3, 1986.

== See also ==
- National Register of Historic Places listings in Sherborn, Massachusetts
