= Shaw House (Fairmont, West Virginia) =

Historic house in West Virginia, United States

- U.S. National Register of Historic Places
- U.S. Historic district
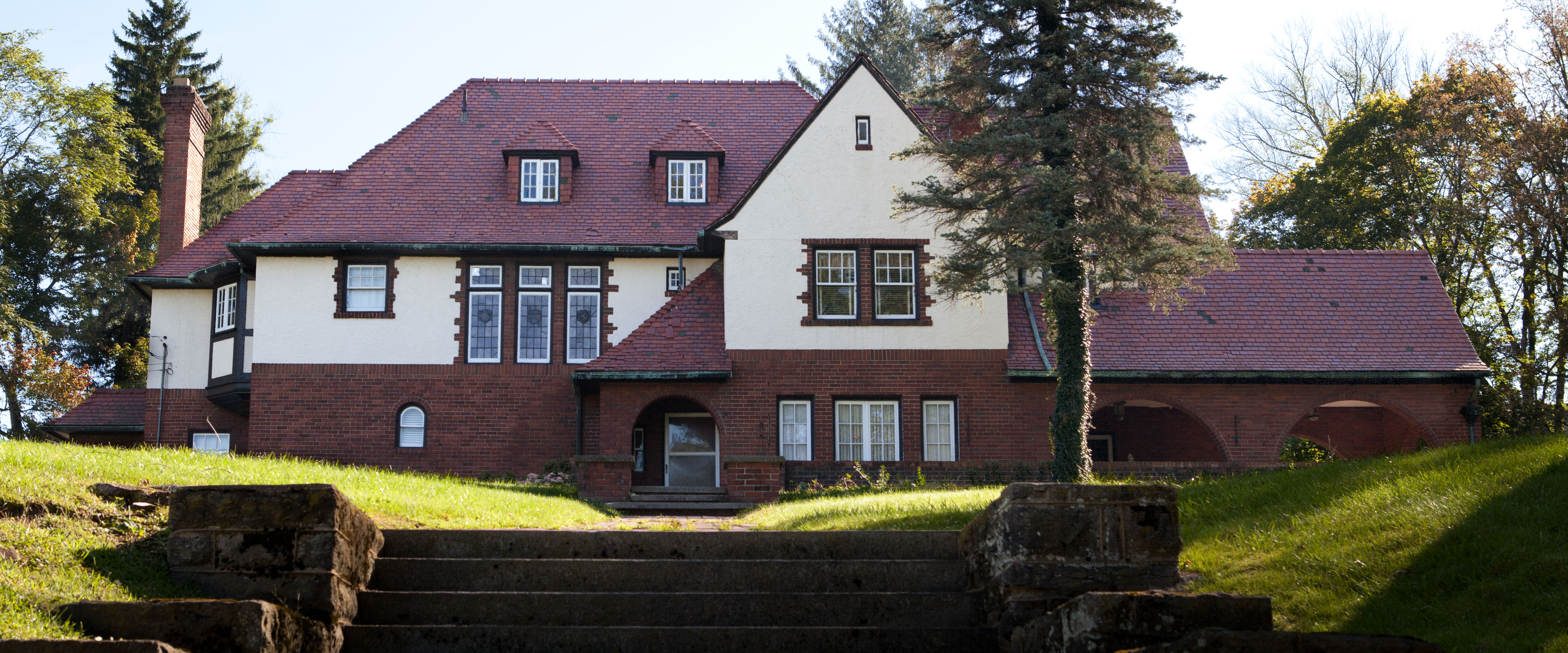

- Location within West Virginia Location within the United States
- Location: 425 Morgantown Ave., Fairmont, West Virginia
- Coordinates: 39°28′50″N 80°7′56.1″W
- Area: 2.4 acres (0.97 ha)
- Built: 1919
- Built by: Alex. MacElwee
- Architect: Jones & Nuzum
- Architectural style: Tudor Revival
- NRHP reference No.: 88001461
- Added to NRHP: September 14, 1988

Shaw House is a historic home and national historic district located at Fairmont, Marion County, West Virginia. The district includes two contributing buildings and two contributing structures. The main house was built in 1919, and is a 2 1/2-story dwelling in the Tudor Revival style. It features brick and stucco wall cladding punctuated with simulated half-timbering, and tall chimney stacks. Also on the property are a contributing garage, well house, and entrance pavilion. The house was built for Harry Shaw (1872 - 1952), a noted attorney and jurist of the early 20th century in north-central West Virginia.

It was listed on the National Register of Historic Places in 1988.
