= Marion County Courthouse (West Virginia) =

- Marion County Courthouse and Sheriff's House
- U.S. National Register of Historic Places
- The Marion County Courthouse in 2015

- Location within West Virginia
- Interactive map of Marion County Courthouse and Sheriff's House
- Location: Fairmont, West Virginia
- Coordinates: 39°29′6″N 80°8′37″W
- Built: 1897-1900
- Architect: Yost & Packard
- Architectural style: Beaux-Arts (Courthouse); American Foursquare (Sheriff's house)
- NRHP reference No.: 79003149
- Added to NRHP: May 29, 1979

The Marion County Courthouse is a Beaux-Arts style building in Fairmont, West Virginia, in the United States. The courthouse was constructed from 1897 to 1900, and was designed by the architectural firm of Yost & Packard of Columbus, Ohio. Its dome is topped by a figure carrying the scales of justice.

The courthouse, located at the intersection of Adams and Jefferson Streets in downtown Fairmont, and the adjacent American Foursquare-style sheriff's residence, were jointly added to the National Register of Historic Places in 1979 for their architectural, artistic and governmental significance.

== Popular culture ==
- Scenes in the film The Bad Guarduan were filmed in the Marion County Courthouse.

== See also ==
- List of Registered Historic Places in West Virginia
