= Thomas W. Fleming House (Fairmont, West Virginia) =

Historic house in West Virginia, United States

- U.S. National Register of Historic Places
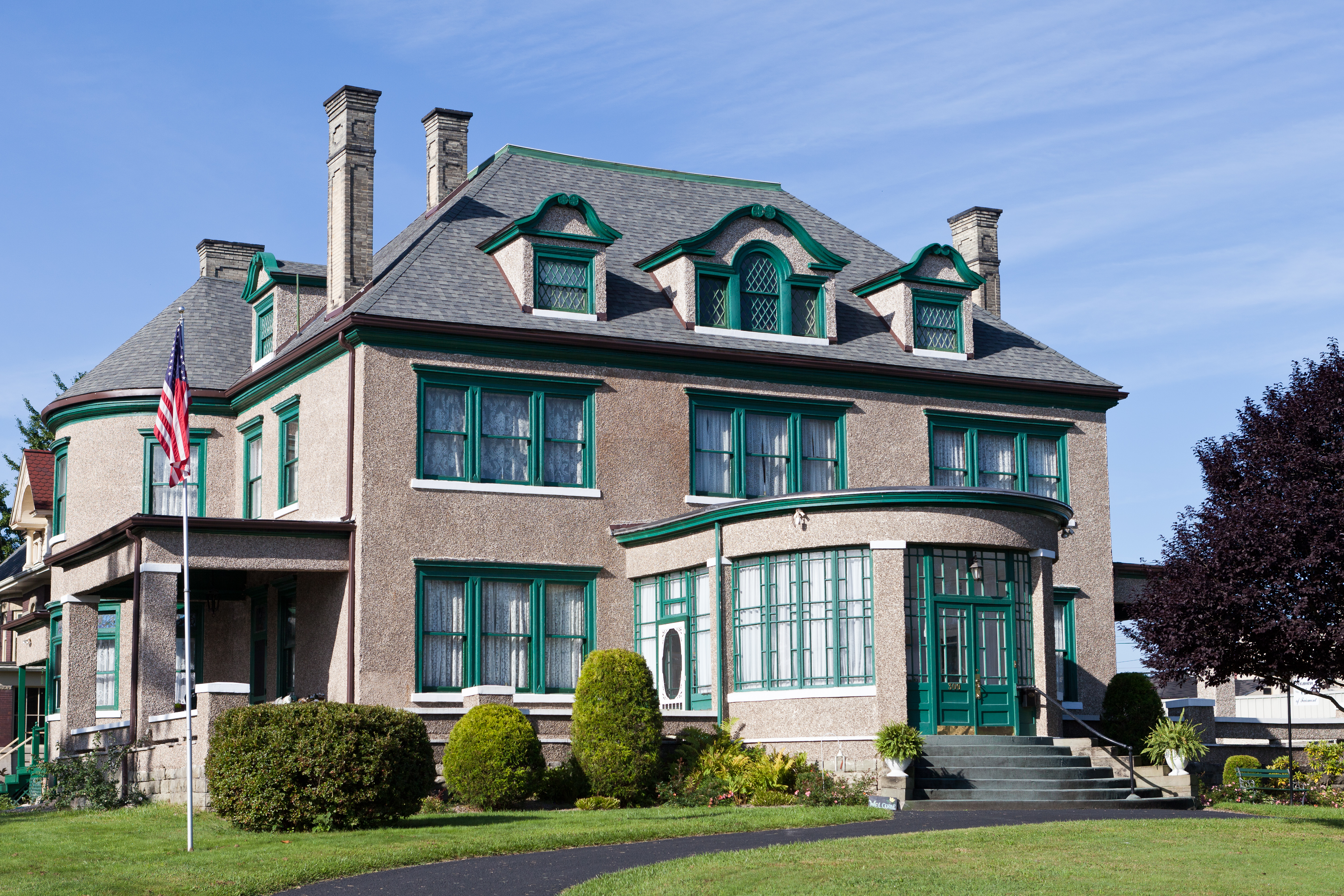

- Location within West Virginia Location within the United States
- Location: 300 1st St., Fairmont, West Virginia
- Coordinates: 39°28′53.4″N 80°8′41.28″W
- Area: 0.4 acres (0.16 ha)
- Built: 1901
- Architectural style: Colonial Revival, Beaux Arts
- NRHP reference No.: 79002587
- Added to NRHP: August 29, 1979

Thomas W. Fleming House, also known as the Clubhouse of the Women's Club of Fairmont, is a historic home located at Fairmont, Marion County, West Virginia. It was built in 1901, and is a 2 1/2-story, U-shaped, stucco masonry building in a Colonial Revival / Beaux-Arts style. It has a rectangular central block that is joined at the rear by two short wings. It features rounded, glass-enclosed entrance solarium. It became the clubhouse of the Fairmont Woman's Club in 1938. Its builder, Thomas W. Fleming (1846-1937), served two terms as mayor of Fairmont and was elected to the House of Delegates in 1905.

It was listed on the National Register of Historic Places in 1979.
