= Fleming–Watson Historic District =

Historic district in West Virginia, United States

- U.S. National Register of Historic Places
- U.S. Historic district
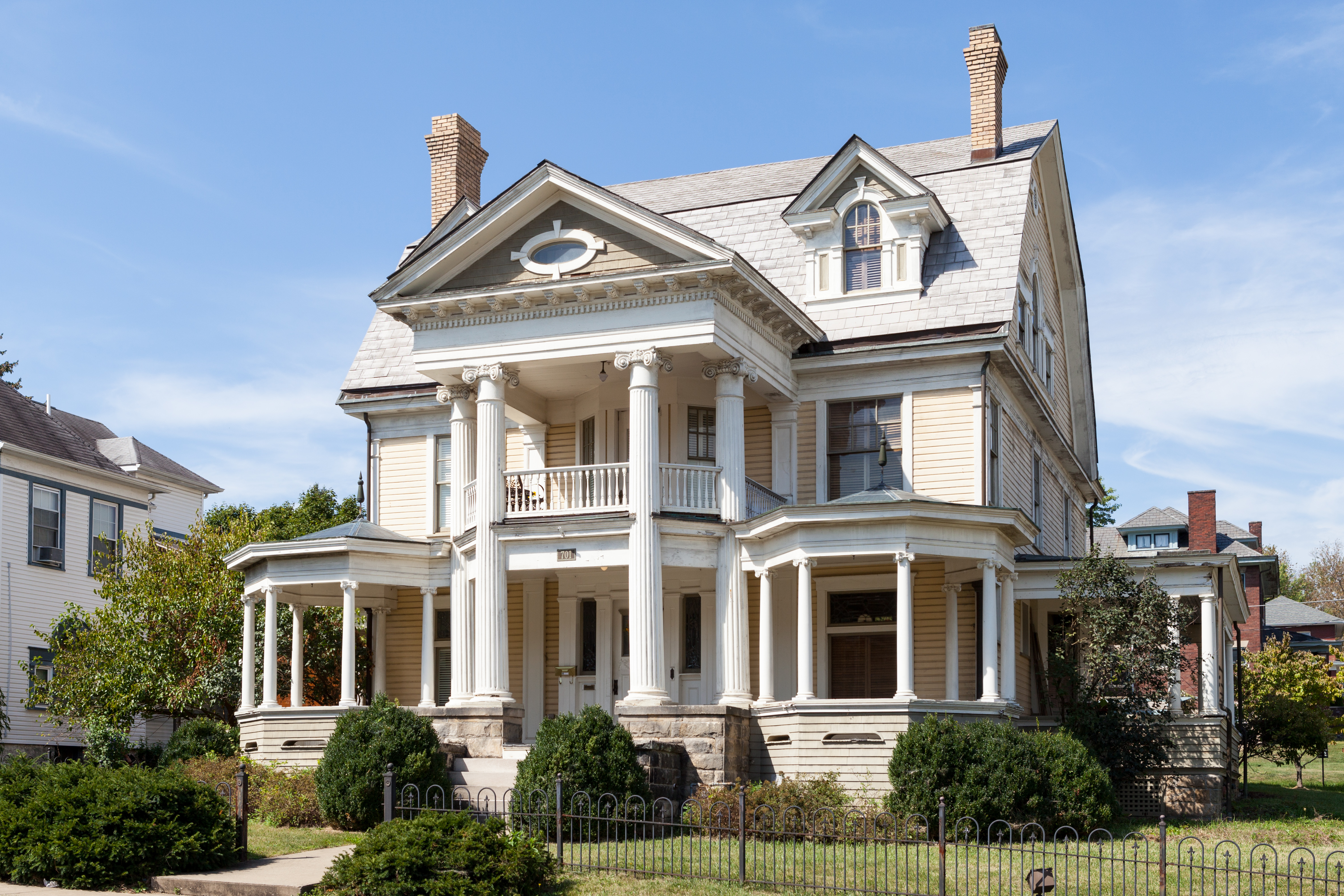
- Hutchinson Mansion at 701 Benoni Avenue

- Location within West Virginia Location within the United States
- Location: Approximately bounded by Fairmont Ave., Second, Fay Sts., Apple Ct, Green, Emerson Sts., Coleman Ave., Seventh St., Outlook, Fairmont, West Virginia
- Coordinates: 39°28′53″N 80°8′36″W
- Area: 84 acres (34 ha)
- Architect: Lyons, A.C., Giffon, George
- Architectural style: Various
- NRHP reference No.: 01001330
- Added to NRHP: November 29, 2001

The Fleming–Watson Historic District comprises 365 buildings and 1 structure of architecture significance on 84 acres (0.34 km^{2}) in Fairmont, West Virginia. It is in two irregular sections separated by a ravine, approximately bounded by Fairmont Avenue, Second and Fay Streets, Apple Crescent, Green and Emerson Streets, Coleman Avenue, Ninth Street, and Outlook. High Gate, the James Edwin Watson House, also listed on the National Register of Historic Places, is located in the district.

The district contains a variety of the architectural styles that were common from 1850 to 1951. It was listed on the National Register of Historic Places in 2001.
